= 1963 Boston mayoral election =

Election in Massachusetts, United States

- November 5, 1963
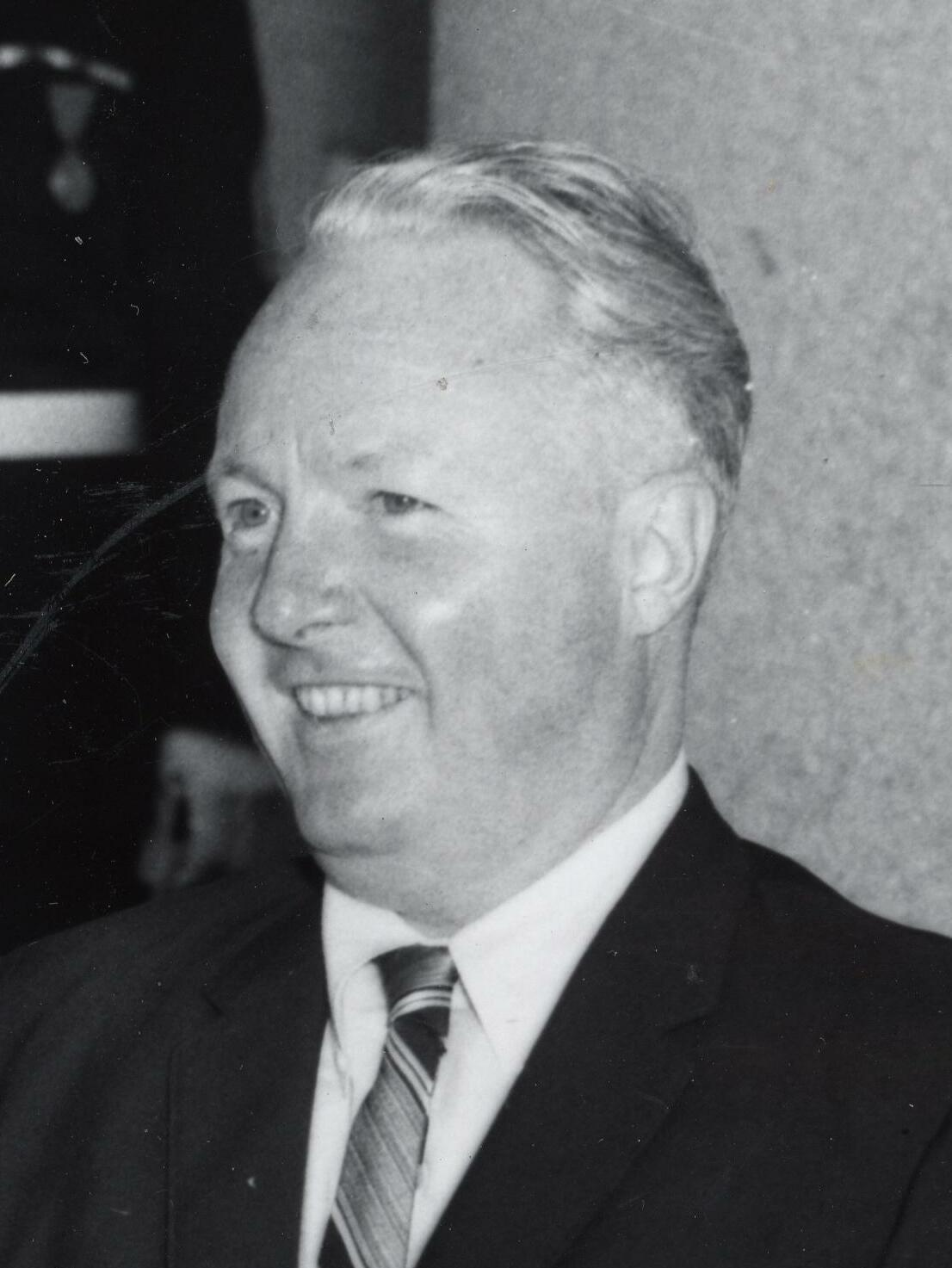

Candidate	John F. Collins	Gabriel Piemonte
Party	Nonpartisan	Nonpartisan
Popular vote	108,624	73,067
Percentage	59.79%	40.22%
- Results by ward Collins: 50–60% 60–70% 70–80% Piemonte: 50–60% 60–70%
Mayor before election
John F. Collins
Elected mayor
John F. Collins

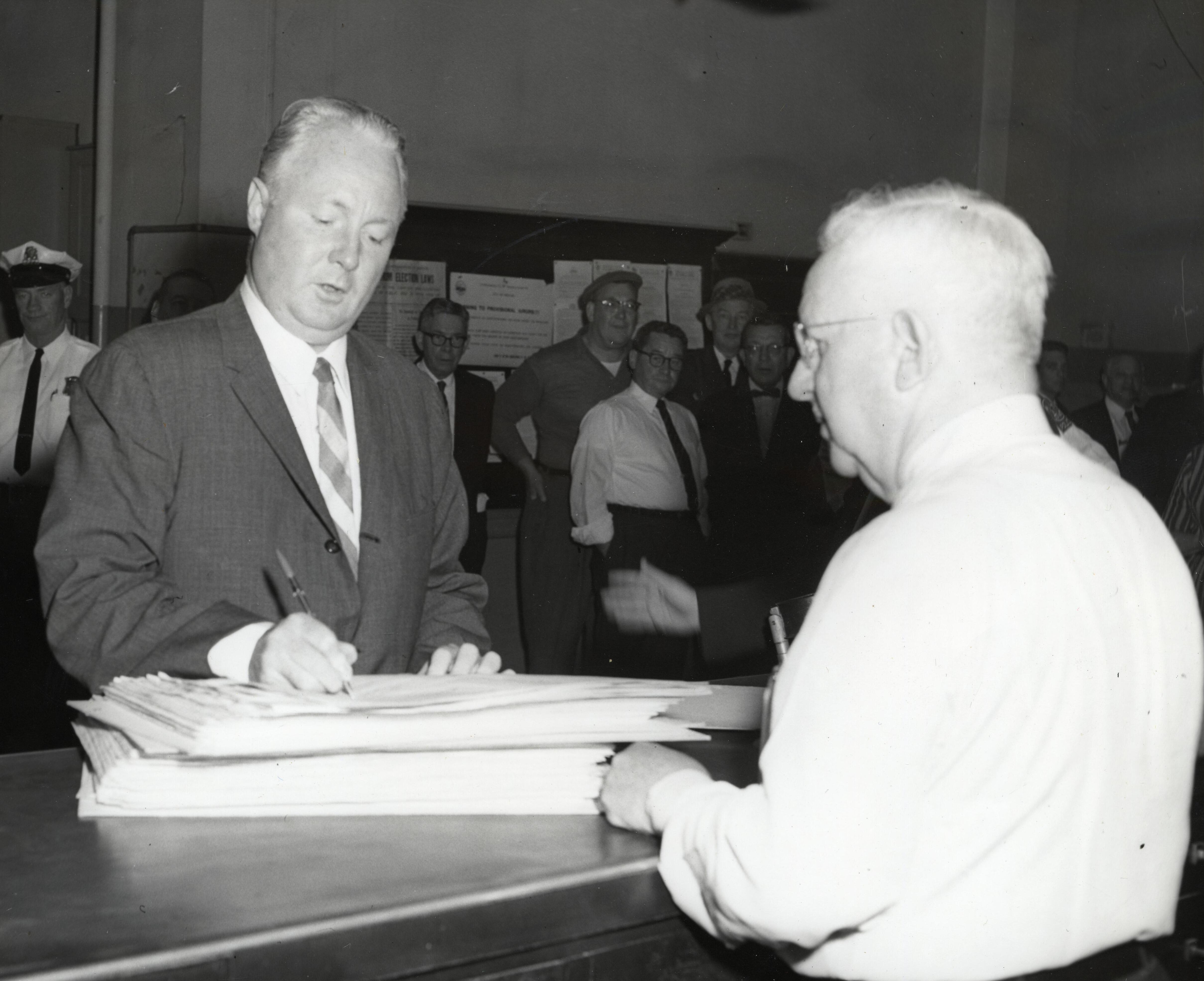
Collins filing to run for re-election

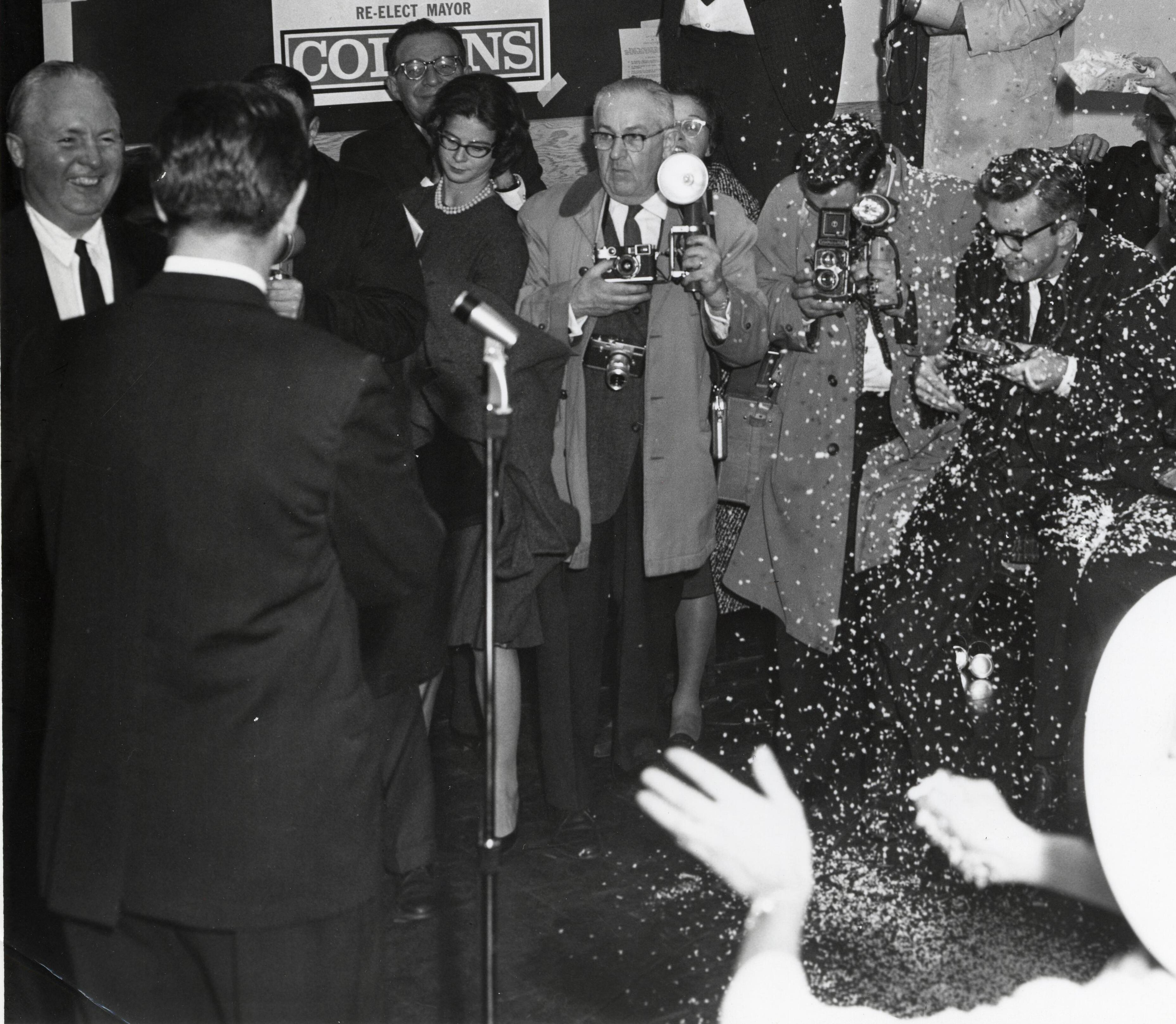
Mayor Collins (upper left) speaks to reporters after his victory

The Boston mayoral election of 1963 occurred on Tuesday, November 5, 1963, between Mayor of Boston John F. Collins and Boston City Council member Gabriel Piemonte. Collins was elected to his second term.

The nonpartisan municipal preliminary election was held on September 24, 1963.

== Candidates ==
- John F. Collins, Mayor of Boston since 1960. Member of the Boston City Council from 1956 to 1957, member of the Massachusetts Senate from 1951 to 1955.
- Gabriel Piemonte, member of the Boston City Council from 1952 to 1959 and since 1962.

=== Candidates eliminated in preliminary ===
- Julius Ansel, member of the Massachusetts House of Representatives since 1959 and from 1953 to 1955. Member of the Boston City Council from 1948 to 1951.
- William P. Foley, Boston environmental health inspector
- Patrick F. McDonough, member of the Boston City Council since 1956.

== Results ==
Candidates	Preliminary Election		General Election	
Candidates	Votes	%	Votes	%
John F. Collins (incumbent)	56,989	45.99	108,624	59.79
Gabriel Piemonte	27,492	22.19	73,067	40.22
Patrick F. McDonough	26,576	21.45		
Julius Ansel	11,729	9.47		
William P. Foley	1,137	0.92		

== See also ==
- List of mayors of Boston, Massachusetts
