= William J. Foley Jr. =

American lawyer (1923–1984)

William J. Foley Jr. (December 18, 1923 – June 24, 1984) was an American politician who served on the Boston City Council from 1952 to 1970.

== Early life ==
Foley was born on December 18, 1923, in South Boston to Theresa (Liston) Foley and Suffolk County District Attorney William J. Foley. He graduated from St. Augustine's School, Boston College High School, and Lawrence Academy. He attended the College of the Holy Cross, where he was a member of the school's first Reserve Officers' Training Corps class.

During World War II, Foley served on the battleship Wyoming and carriers Intrepid and Munda. Foley graduated from the College of the Holy Cross in 1944 and earned his Bachelor of Laws from the Boston University School of Law in 1948. He was admitted to the bar in October 1948 and became an assistant district attorney under his father. In the summer 1952, Foley married Lillian A. McArdle of Nahant, Massachusetts. They had two sons and a daughter.

== Political career ==
In 1951, Foley was elected to the Boston City Council. He led the field, receiving about 18,000 more votes than the second-place candidate Joseph C. White. On December 1, 1952, Foley Sr. died. Despite pressure to give the job to Foley Jr. or another well-known political figure, Governor Paul A. Dever appointed assistant district attorney Garrett H. Byrne. Byrne kept on all of Foley Sr.'s assistant district attorneys, but Foley resigned in July 1953 and joined the firm of Frost and Breath. In 1954, Foley challenged Byrne for District Attorney. Foley lost to Byrne 46% to 25% in a four-candidate primary that also included Gabriel Piemonte and Timothy J. Murphy. In 1955, Foley received the most votes in the city council election for the third consecutive election. In 1957, Foley was elected council president. In 1958, Foley ran for Suffolk County Register of Deeds, an office that became open when Leo J. Sullivan was appointed Boston police commissioner. Foley finished second in the Democratic primary behind Joseph D. Coughlin, who had been appointed to complete Sullivan's term. In 1968, Foley was elected council president over Patrick F. McDonough 5 votes to 4. Foley had the support of Thomas I. Atkins, Frederick C. Langone, John L. Saltonstall Jr., and Joseph F. Timilty while Garrett M. Byrne, John E. Kerrigan, and Gerald O'Leary voted for McDonough.

During his tenure on the council, Foley was described as “rough, articulate” “skillful parliamentarian and an adept needler of witnesses and other councilors". In 1956, The Boston Globe‘s Joseph A. Keblinsky wrote that "Galleryites always could expect mellifluous oratory and passages from Shakespeare, Cicero, Pliny, Virgil and Homer whenever "Bill" stood up on the council floor, particularly when it was some measure by councilor Gabriel Francisco (sic) Piemonte". Other subjects of Foley's attacks included Boston Redevelopment Authority head Edward J. Logue, whom he called a “bad-for-Boston demagogue”, John E. Kerrigan, a fellow councilor and former ally whom he had a falling out with over urban renewal in South Boston, and councillor Katherine Craven, who once threw an ashtray at Foley after he insulted her.

== Later life ==
Foley was one of three councilors defeated for reelection in 1969. He was an unsuccessful candidate for the council in 1971 and the Boston school committee in 1973 and 1981. Foley died on June 24, 1984, of an apparent heart attack. He was 60 years old.

Preceded by Edward J. McCormack Jr. Barry T. Hynes	President of the Boston City Council; 1957; 1968	Succeeded by Patrick F. McDonough; Gerald O'Leary
