= Gerald O'Leary =

American politician (1932–2014)

Gerald F. O'Leary
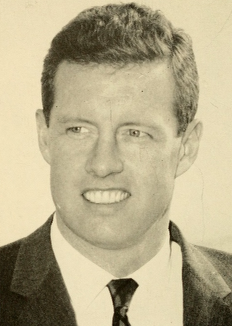

Member of the Massachusetts House of Representatives from the 5th Suffolk District
- In office 1965–1969

President of the Boston City Council
- In office 1974–1975
- Preceded by: Patrick F. McDonough
- Succeeded by: Louise Day Hicks
- In office 1969
- Preceded by: William J. Foley Jr.
- Succeeded by: Gabriel F. Piemonte

Member of the Boston City Council
- In office 1968–1975

Member of the Boston School Committee
- In office January 1980 – October 4, 1980

Personal details
- Born: August 7, 1932 Boston, Massachusetts, U.S.
- Died: May 23, 2014 (aged 81) Quincy, Massachusetts, U.S.
- Party: Democratic
- Education: College of the Holy Cross (BA); Portia Law School (JD)
- Occupation: Broker

Gerald F. "Gerry" O’Leary (August 7, 1932 – May 23, 2014) was an American politician from South Boston, Massachusetts.

O'Leary was born on August 7, 1932, in Boston. He attended English High School of Boston, College of the Holy Cross, and Portia Law School. A student athlete, O'Leary ran the 400 metres at English and played running back for the Holy Cross football team.

O'Leary represented the 5th Suffolk District in the Massachusetts House of Representatives from 1965 to 1969. He then went on to serve on the Boston City Council from 1968 to 1975. He was the Council's President in 1969 and from 1974 to 1975. He lost re-election in 1975. He ran for the United States Senate in 1972, but lost to Middlesex County District Attorney John J. Droney in the Democratic primary. In 1979, he was elected to the Boston School Committee. He resigned on October 4, 1980, after being arrested and charged with attempting to extort a $650,000 kickback from a school bus company. He pleaded guilty to violating the Hobbs Act and was sentenced to eighteen months in prison.

O'Leary died on May 23, 2014, at his home in Quincy, Massachusetts.

Preceded by William J. Foley Jr. Patrick F. McDonough	President of the Boston City Council; 1969; 1974–1975	Succeeded by Gabriel Piemonte; Louise Day Hicks
