= Barry T. Hynes =

American politician

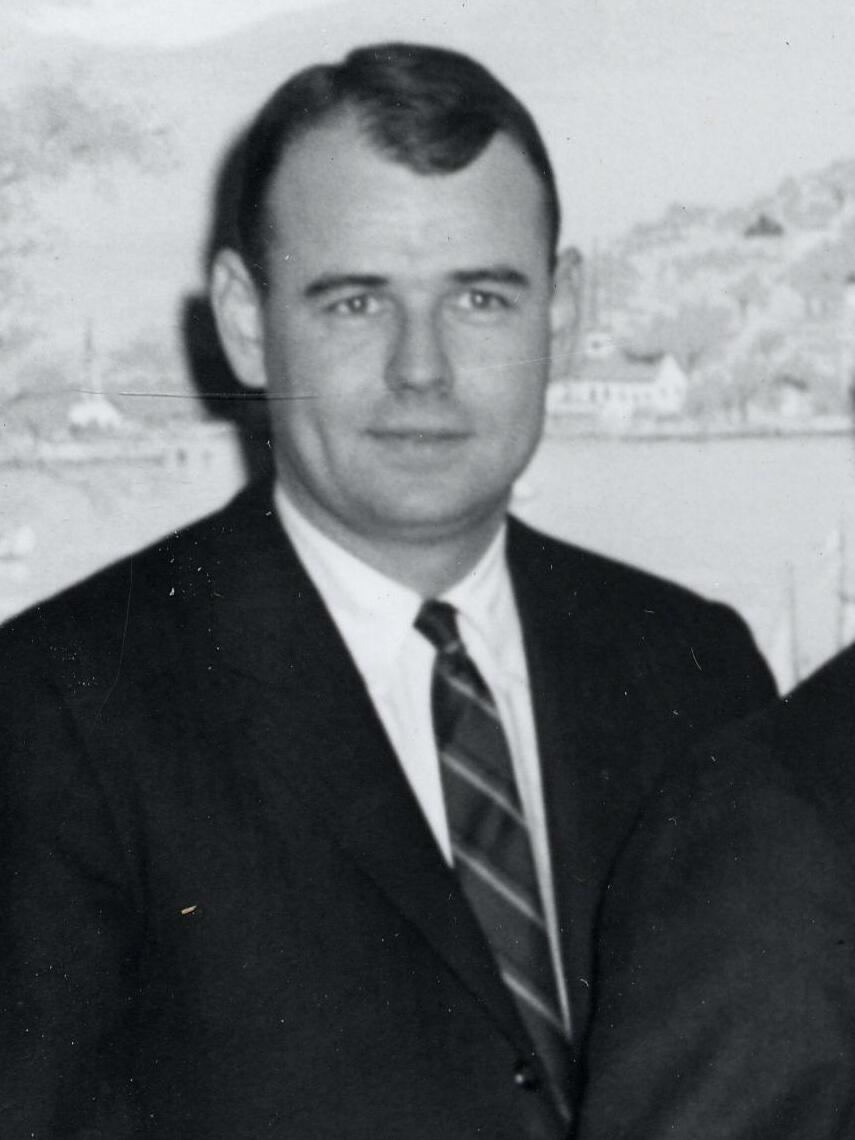
Hynes in 1964

Barry T. Hynes is an American politician who served as a Boston City Councilor and as Boston's City Clerk.

Hynes grew up in Boston's Dorchester neighborhood. His father, John Hynes, was Mayor of Boston from 1950 to 1960. Hynes graduated from Boston College High School and the University of Notre Dame.

Hynes served on the Boston City Council from 1964 to 1967. He was president of the Council in 1967. Hynes was a candidate for Mayor of Boston in 1967, but dropped out one month before the preliminary election. After leaving the council, he worked as an aide to Mayor Kevin White. In 1978, Hynes was named Boston City Clerk. He resigned in 1983 to work full-time at his travel agency.

Outside politics Hynes worked as a stockbroker, real estate broker, and novelist.

== School Initiatives ==
Hynes is founder of Nativity Preparatory School in Boston and Nativity Preparatory School of New Bedford, as well as co-founder of Paraclete in South Boston with Sister Ann Fox.

| Preceded by Frederick C. Langone | President of the Boston City Council; 1967 | Succeeded by William J. Foley Jr. |
| Preceded by Frederic O'Donnell | Boston City Clerk; 1978–1983 | Succeeded by Jack Campbell |
