= John J. Tierney =

American politician (1924–2005)

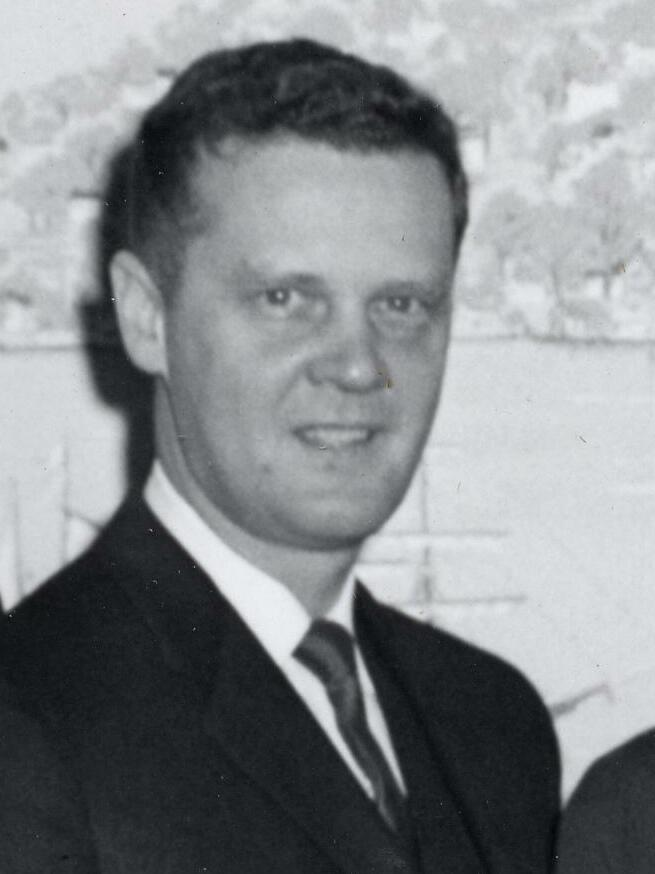
Tierney in 1964

John J. Tierney Jr. (June 27, 1924 – October 2005) served two terms on the Boston School Committee in the late 1950s (also was chairman) and served on the Boston City Council from 1960 to 1964, twice serving as the council's president. After losing a reelection bid, Tierney was a budget analyst for the council before being appointed commissioner of Boston Parks and Recreation in 1966 by mayor John Collins. He served until 1968.

== Early life ==
Born in South Boston, he was the eldest of eight children, Tierney graduated from Boston English High School in 1943 and then enlisted in the Marine Corps. He served as a flight navigator during World War II in the Pacific Theater. After the war, he worked as a policeman for the Boston Police Department in 1948 while attending Suffolk University and Suffolk Law School. He passed the bar in 1956 and worked as a public defender for a year.
