= Patrick F. McDonough =

American lawyer

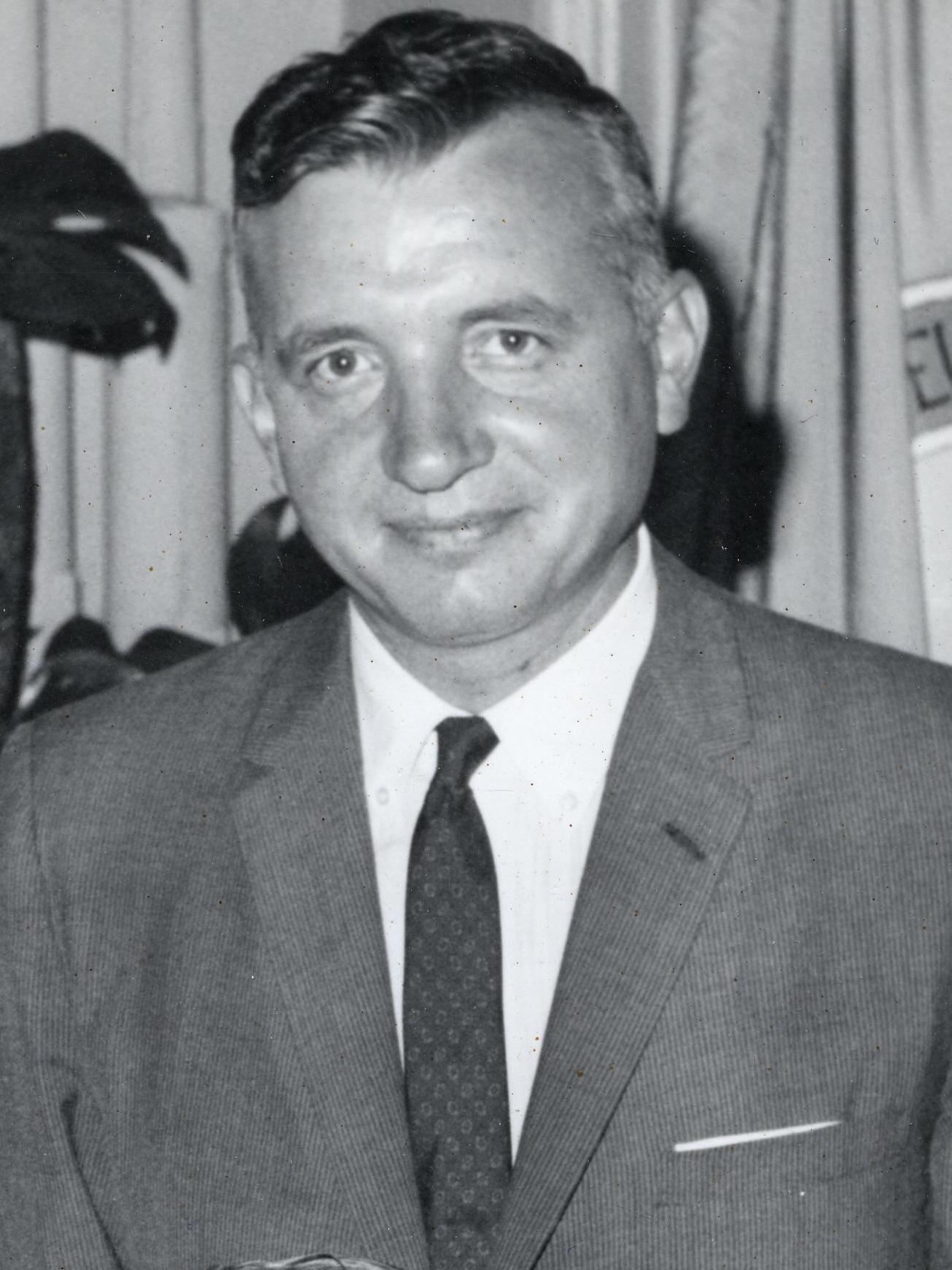
- McDonough in the 1960s

President of the Boston City Council
- In office 1981
- Preceded by: Christopher A. Iannella
- Succeeded by: Christopher A. Iannella
- In office 1973
- Preceded by: Gabriel Piemonte
- Succeeded by: Gerald O'Leary
- In office 1961
- Preceded by: Edward F. McLaughlin Jr.
- Succeeded by: Christopher A. Iannella
- In office 1958
- Preceded by: William J. Foley Jr.
- Succeeded by: Edward F. McLaughlin Jr.

Member of the Boston City Council
- In office 1956–1982

Boston City Clerk
- In office 1990–1995
- Preceded by: John P. Campbell
- Succeeded by: Rosaria Salerno

Personal details
- Born: Connemara, Ireland
- Died: June 20, 2001 Plymouth, New Hampshire, U.S.
- Relatives: John J. McDonough (brother)
- Occupation: Police officer, attorney, politician

Patrick F. McDonough (died June 20, 2001 in Plymouth, New Hampshire) was a police officer, attorney, and politician who served as a member of the Boston City Council from 1956–64, 1966–70, and 1972–82. He was the Council President in 1958, 1961, 1973, and 1981.

After leaving the city council, McDonough served as assistant city clerk from 1983 to 1990 and city clerk from 1990 to 1995.

McDonough was an unsuccessful candidate for Suffolk County Register of Deeds in 1958, Massachusetts Treasurer and Receiver-General in 1960, Mayor of Boston in 1963, and United States Representative from Massachusetts's 11th congressional district in 1978.

McDonough was the brother of Boston School Committee member John J. McDonough.

Preceded by William J. Foley Jr. Edward F. McLaughlin Jr. Gabriel Piemonte; Christopher A. Iannella	President of the Boston City Council; 1958; 1961; 1973; 1981	Succeeded by Edward F. McLaughlin Jr. Christopher A. Iannella; Gerald O'Leary; Christopher A. Iannella
Preceded by Jack Campbell	Boston City Clerk; 1990–1995	Succeeded by Rosaria Salerno
