= Boston City Council =

Municipal council of Boston, Massachusetts, U.S.

- Seal of Boston

- Logo

Type
- Type: Unicameral deliberative assembly of Boston

History
- Founded: 1909 (current iteration)
- Preceded by: Boston City Council (1822–1909)

Leadership
- Council President: Liz Breadon (D)

Structure
- Seats: 13 officially non-partisan 9 district councilors 4 at-large councilors
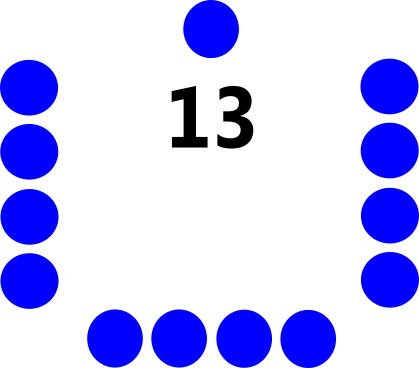
- Length of term: 2 years

Elections
- Voting system: First past the post in 9 districts; Nonpartisan Plurality-at-large voting for the at-large district.
- Last election: November 2025
- Next election: November 2027

Meeting place
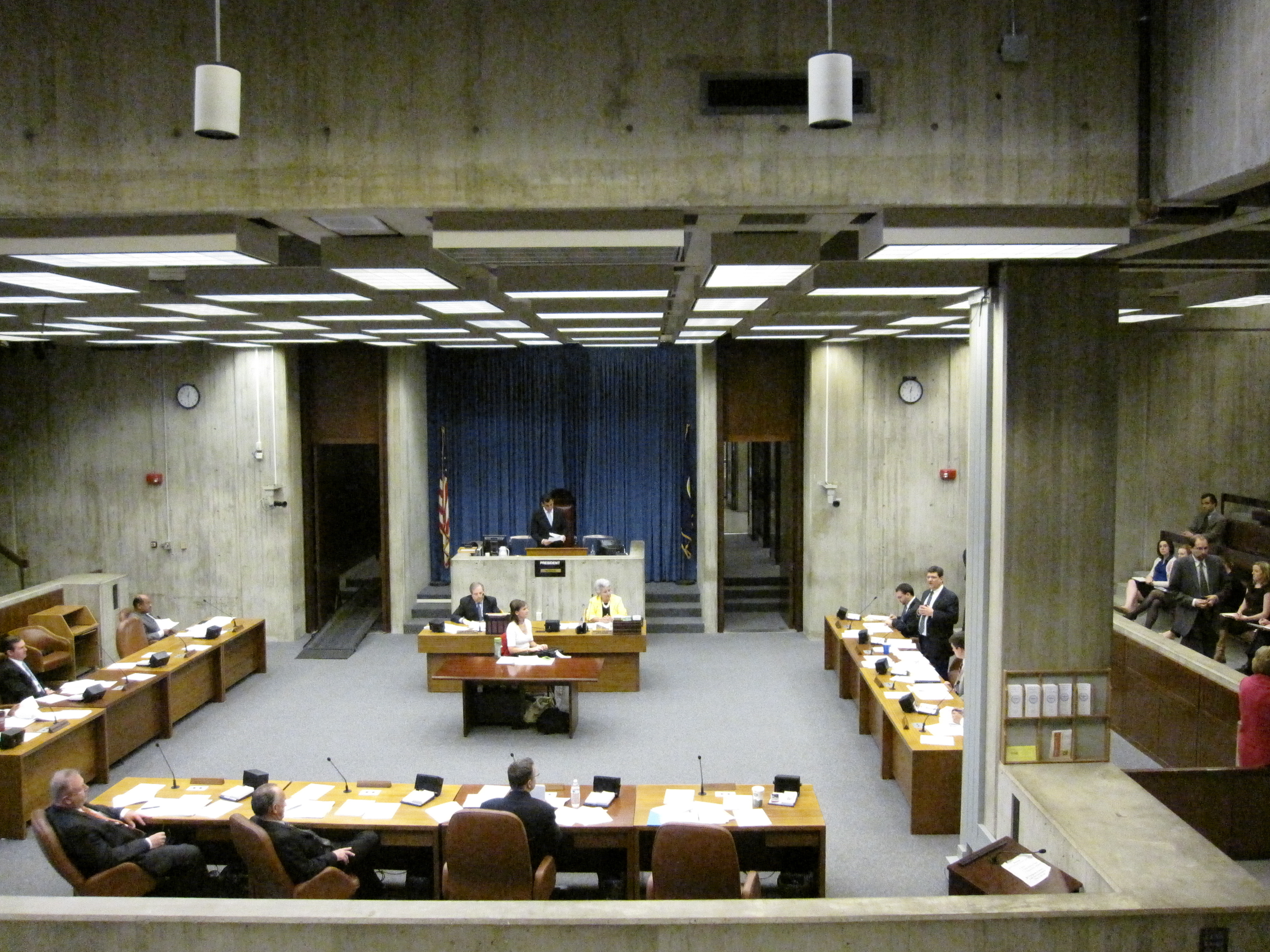
- Boston City Hall

Website
- https://www.boston.gov/departments/city-council

Constitution
- Boston City Charter

The Boston City Council is the legislative branch of government for the city of Boston, Massachusetts, United States. It is made up of 13 members: 9 district representatives and 4 at-large members. Councillors are elected to two-year terms, and there is no limit on the number of terms an individual can serve. Boston uses a strong-mayor form of government in which the city council acts as a check against the power of the executive branch, the mayor. The council is responsible for approving the city budget; monitoring, creating, and abolishing city agencies; making land use decisions; and approving, amending, or rejecting other legislative proposals.

The current unicameral iteration of the council was established in 1909, replacing a bicameral iteration that had been formed in 1822.

The leader of the City Council is the president and is elected each term by the council. A majority of seven or more votes is necessary to elect a councillor as president. When the mayor of Boston is absent from the city, or vacates the office, the City Council president serves as acting mayor. The president leads Council meetings and appoints councillors to committees.

== Qualifications ==
Any person seeking to become a City Councillor in Boston must meet the following requirements:

- Be at least eighteen years of age
- Be a registered voter in Massachusetts
- Be a resident of their district for at least one year when elected
- Receive 1500 signatures from registered voters for At Large City Councillor
- Receive 200 signatures from registered voters for District City Councillor

== History ==
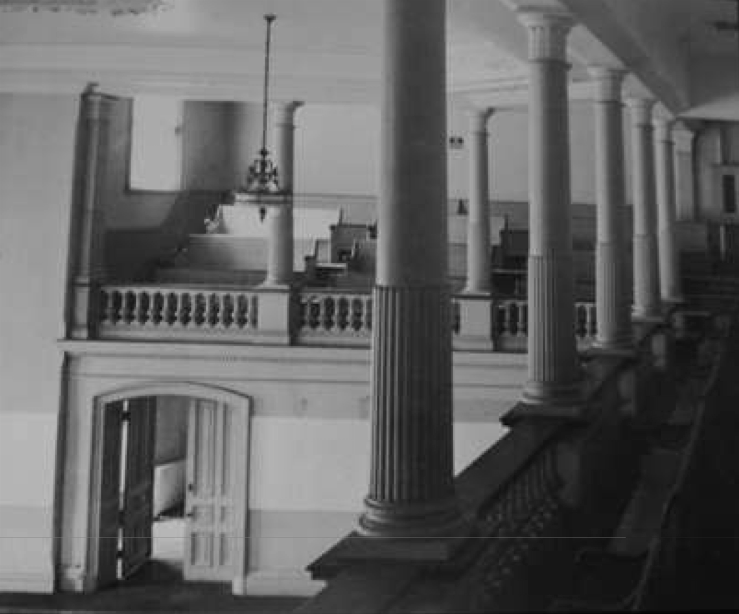
Historic photograph of the council chamber at Old City Hall (used until 1969)

=== Previous City Council ===
Prior to 1909, Boston's legislative body was bicameral, with an eight-member Board of Aldermen as well as a Common Council made up of three representatives from each of the 25 wards in the city. When the Boston City Charter was rewritten in 1909, the Board of Aldermen and the Common Council were replaced by a nine-member unicameral City Council. All nine councillors were elected at-large for terms lasting two years. The new charter also gave the Mayor the power to veto all acts of the City Council. The first council meeting as a unicameral body occurred on February 7, 1910.

The procedure for electing city councillors was changed by Chapter 479 of the Acts of 1924, which provided for the election of 22 city councillors, one from each ward, beginning with the biennial election in 1925. The procedure was changed again by Chapter 356 of the Acts of 1951, which provided for the election of nine city councillors, all at large, for two-year terms. In November 1981, Boston voters approved again changing the composition of the council, to 13 members: 9 district representatives and 4 at-large members.

=== District representation ===
The 1981 referendum establishing the current 13-member composition of the Council did not indicate how the district lines would be drawn, only that the districts be of approximately equal population and district lines not cut across city precincts.

The Council created a districting committee to propose several different possible district maps and hold public hearings before presenting one plan to the council to approve. State law required the City Council to make a final decision on the districts within 90 days of being notified that the referendum had officially passed, meaning that the Council voting on the districts would be the 1982 Council, not the 1981 Council creating them. Then-president Patrick F. McDonough, who opposed district representation, appointed Rosemarie E. Sansone, a major advocate of district representation, as chair of the districting committee, but chose Frederick C. Langone, Dapper O'Neil, and John W. Sears as the other three members, all of whom opposed district representation. Both Langone and O'Neil would be returning to the Council in 1982, but Sansone did not run for re-election in 1981 and would not be able to vote on the district boundaries if the committee did not work quickly to present a plan to the council before the end of the year. Public hearings over possible district boundaries were full of heated debate between advocates of drawing lines to protect neighborhood unity and advocates of drawing lines to create two predominantly minority districts and give minorities a voice in local government. Contention centered around Dorchester and the South End. Dorchester, Boston's largest neighborhood, needed to be split into at least two districts. A simple split in half would create either a north and a south district or an east and a west district. An east district would be largely White (75% or greater) and a west district would be largely African-American. North and south districts would have less extreme majorities. Many residents were opposed to both divisions, stating that they would increase racial segregation in Dorchester and continue the political powerlessness of minorities. A more complicated split taking into account areas with large minority populations would create one predominantly minority district and one predominantly white district but treat Dorchester as several smaller neighborhoods to be divvied up among surrounding neighborhoods rather than as one community. In various proposals, the South End, due to its location, was grouped with either South Boston or Back Bay/Beacon Hill by advocates of neighborhood unity, or Roxbury by advocates of minority-dominated districts.

Two days before the 90-day deadline, freshman councillor Terence P. McDermott, who had been appointed as Sansone's replacement for chair of the districting committee, presented a plan to the Council which was approved 7–2 (the dissenting votes came from Raymond Flynn and Bruce Bolling). Today's district boundaries are only slightly different from those adopted in 1982, with the South End and South Boston forming one district, and Dorchester roughly split into an east and a west district. The Council faced more challenges after finalizing the new districts, such as whether or not district councillors should receive a lower salary than at-large councillors and where office space for four additional councillors could be found in City Hall.

=== Party affiliation ===
By law, Boston municipal elections are nonpartisan in that candidates do not represent a specific political party. However, most city councillors have been members of the Democratic Party. John W. Sears was the first Republican elected to the Boston City Council, in 1980. Chuck Turner, who served during 1999–2010, was a member of the Green-Rainbow Party. Althea Garrison, who served during 2019, has identified as an independent since 2012, but formerly served in the Massachusetts House of Representatives as a Republican.

=== Acting mayors ===
When the Mayor of Boston is absent from the city, or vacates the office, the City Council president serves as acting mayor. The city charter places some restrictions on an acting mayor's authority: an acting mayor "shall possess the powers of mayor only in matters not admitting of delay, but shall have no power to make permanent appointments." Three presidents of the Boston City Council have served as acting mayors of Boston for extended periods after the Mayor vacated the office:

- John E. Kerrigan served as acting mayor from January 1945 to January 1946, after mayor Maurice J. Tobin was elected Governor of Massachusetts. The Massachusetts legislature granted Kerrigan full mayoral authority. He sought election to a full term, but lost the November 1945 mayoral election to James Michael Curley.
  - In 1947, upon mayor Curley being sentenced to prison for mail fraud, the Massachusetts legislature passed emergency legislation to bypass council president John B. Kelly, who had recently been acquitted on bribery charges and was in ill health, and granted full mayoral powers to city clerk John Hynes until Curley's release.
- Thomas Menino became acting mayor in July 1993 upon mayor Raymond Flynn taking the position of United States Ambassador to the Holy See. Menino served as acting mayor until he was elected to his first full term in November 1993.
- Kim Janey became acting mayor in March 2021 upon mayor Marty Walsh taking the position of United States Secretary of Labor. Janey was an unsuccessful candidate in the November 2021 mayoral election.

In June 2021, the city council granted itself the authority to remove its president by a two-thirds majority vote. Should that action occur while a council president is serving as acting mayor, the role of acting mayor would be assigned to the new council president who would be elected by a simple majority of the city council. In 2022, the rule was removed.

=== Membership milestones ===
- First female member: Mildred M. Harris (elected in 1937 special election)
- First black member: Laurence H. Banks (elected 1949, not seated until 1951 due to legal disputes)
- First black female member: Ayanna Pressley (elected 2009)
- First Latino member: Felix D. Arroyo (filled vacancy in 2003, elected 2003)
- First Latina member: Julia Mejia (elected 2019)
- First openly gay member: David Scondras (elected 1983)
- First Asian-American member: Sam Yoon (elected 2005)
- First Asian-American female member: Michelle Wu (elected 2013)
- First transgender member: Althea Garrison (filled vacancy in 2019)
- First female president: Louise Day Hicks (elected president 1976)
- First black president: Bruce Bolling (elected president 1986)
- First Asian-American president: Michelle Wu (elected president 2016)
- First black female president: Andrea Campbell (elected president 2018)
- First Muslim member: Tania Fernandes Anderson (elected 2021)
- First Haitian-American member: Ruthzee Louijeune (elected 2021)

== Districts and current council ==
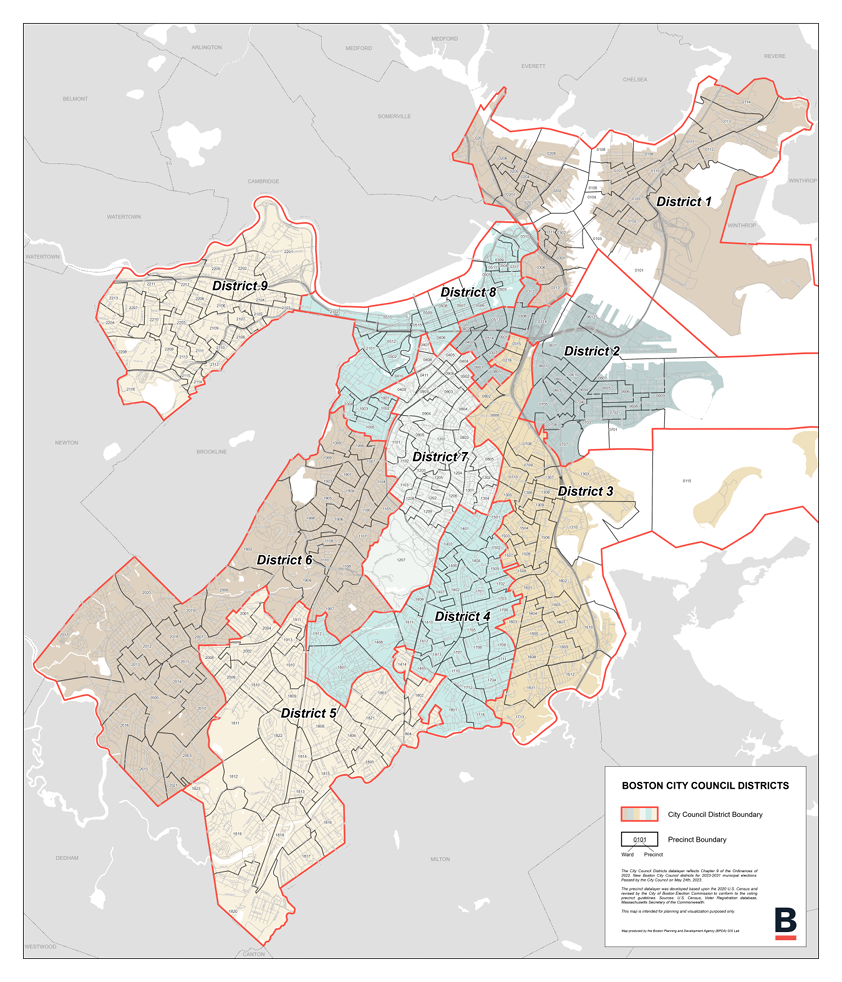

District	Area	Councilor	In office since
District 1	Charlestown, East Boston, North End	Gabriela Coletta Zapata	2022 (May)
District 2	Chinatown, Downtown, South Boston, South End	Ed Flynn	2018 (January)
District 3	Dorchester	John FitzGerald	2024 (January)
District 4	Mattapan, Dorchester, Roslindale, Jamaica Plain	Brian Worrell	2022 (January)
District 5	Hyde Park, Roslindale, Mattapan	Enrique Pepén	2024 (January)
District 6	Jamaica Plain, West Roxbury	Benjamin Weber	2024 (January)
District 7	Roxbury, South End, Dorchester	Miniard Culpepper	2026 (January)
District 8	Back Bay, Beacon Hill, Fenway–Kenmore, Mission Hill, West End	Sharon Durkan	2023 (July)
District 9	Allston, Brighton	Liz Breadon; President	2020 (January)
	(At-large)	Henry Santana	2024 (January)
	(At-large)	Ruthzee Louijeune	2022 (January)
	(At-large)	Julia Mejia	2020 (January)
	(At-large)	Erin Murphy	2022 (January)

== Committees ==
As of January 2020, the City Council has the following committees:

Standing committees

- Arts, Culture, and Special Events
- Census and Redistricting
- City, Neighborhood Services, and Veterans Affairs
- Civil Rights
- Community Preservation Act
- Education
- Environment, Sustainability, and Parks
- Government Operations
- Healthy Women, Families, and Communities
- Homelessness, Mental Health, and Recovery
- Housing and Community Development
- Jobs, Wages, and Workforce Development
- Planning, Development, and Transportation
- Public Safety and Criminal Justice
- Rules and Administration
- Small Business and Consumer Affairs
- Ways and Means
- Whole

Special committees

- Special committee on Charter Reform

== Salary ==
The salary for councillors is half of the mayor's salary. Every four years, the Council votes on whether or not to raise the mayor's salary, thereby also raising its own salaries or not.

In June 2018, the Council voted to increase the salary of the mayor from $199,000 to $207,000, effective after the mayoral election of November 2021 (term starting in January 2022); this increased the salary of councillors to $103,500, effective after the council elections of November 2019 (terms starting in January 2020).

City Council salaries since 1980
Year(s)	Salary	Ref.
1980	$20,000	
1981–1986	$32,500	
1987–1994	$45,000	
1995–1998	$54,500	
1999–2002	$62,500	
2003–2006	$75,000	
2006–2015	$87,500	
2016–2019	$99,500	
2020–present	$103,500	

== Presidents ==
Members of the council elect its president. Currently, rules prohibit a member from serving multiple terms as president consecutively, which results in a change of council president at the start of a council term.

(#) denotes different instances of a councillor serving as president

Year(s)	Name
1910	Walter Ballantyne
1911	Daniel J. McDonald (1)
1912	John J. Attridge
1913	Thomas J. Kenny
1914	Daniel J. McDonald (2)
1915	George E. Coleman
1916	Henry E. Hagan
1917	James J. Storrow
1918	Walter L. Collins
1919	Francis Ford
1920	James T. Moriarty (1)
1921	James A. Watson
1922	David J. Brickley
1923	Daniel W. Lane
1924	John A. Donoghue
1925	James T. Moriarty (2)
1926	Charles G. Keene
1927	John J. Heffernan
1928	Thomas H. Green
1929	Timothy F. Donovan
1930	William G. Lynch
1931	Joseph McGrath (1)
1932	Edward M. Gallagher
1933	Joseph McGrath (2)
1934	John F. Dowd
1935–1937	John I. Fitzgerald
1938	John E. Kerrigan (1)

Year(s)	Name
1939	George A. Murray
1940–1941	William J. Galvin
1942	Thomas E. Linehan
1943	Thomas J. Hannon (1)
1944–1945	John E. Kerrigan (2)^{1}
1946–1947	John B. Kelly
1948	Thomas J. Hannon (2)
1949–1951	William F. Hurley (1)
1952	Gabriel Piemonte (1)
1953	Francis X. Ahearn
1954	Joseph C. White
1955	William F. Hurley (2)
1956	Edward J. McCormack Jr.
1957	William J. Foley Jr. (1)
1958	Patrick F. McDonough (1)
1959–1960	Edward F. McLaughlin Jr.
1961	Patrick F. McDonough (2)
1962	Christopher A. Iannella (1)
1963	Peter F. Hines
1964–1965	John J. Tierney
1966	Frederick C. Langone
1967	Barry T. Hynes
1968	William J. Foley Jr. (2)
1969	Gerald O'Leary (1)
1970–1972	Gabriel Piemonte (2)
1973	Patrick F. McDonough (3)
1974–1975	Gerald O'Leary (2)

Year(s)	Name
1976	Louise Day Hicks
1977	Joseph M. Tierney (1)
1978	Lawrence DiCara
1979	Joseph M. Tierney (2)
1980	Christopher A. Iannella (2)
1981	Patrick F. McDonough (4)
1982	Christopher A. Iannella (3)
1983–1985	Joseph M. Tierney (3)
1986–1987	Bruce Bolling
1988–1992	Christopher A. Iannella (4)
1992	Dapper O'Neil^{2}
1993	Thomas Menino^{3}
1994–2000	James M. Kelly
2001	Charles Yancey
2002–2006	Michael F. Flaherty
2007–2008	Maureen Feeney
2009–2010	Michael P. Ross
2011–2013	Stephen J. Murphy
2014–2015	Bill Linehan
2016–2017	Michelle Wu
2018–2019	Andrea Campbell
2020–2021	Kim Janey^{4}
2022–2023	Ed Flynn
2024–2025	Ruthzee Louijeune
2026–present	Liz Breadon

1. Kerrigan served as acting mayor during a portion of this term as council president

2. O'Neil was elected council president after the death of predecessor.

3. Menino served as acting mayor during a portion of his council presidency

4. Janey served as acting mayor for a portion of her council presidency, and was absent from council proceedings during that time. Matt O'Malley presided over the council in her place.

Gallery of Boston City Council Presidents (partial)
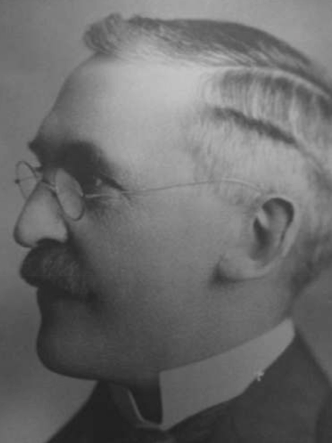
Walter Ballantyne
(1910)

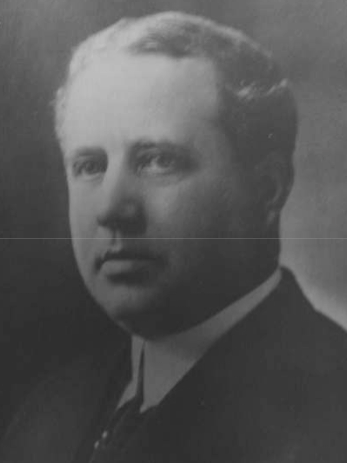
Daniel J. McDonald
(1911, 1914)

John J. Attridge
(1912)

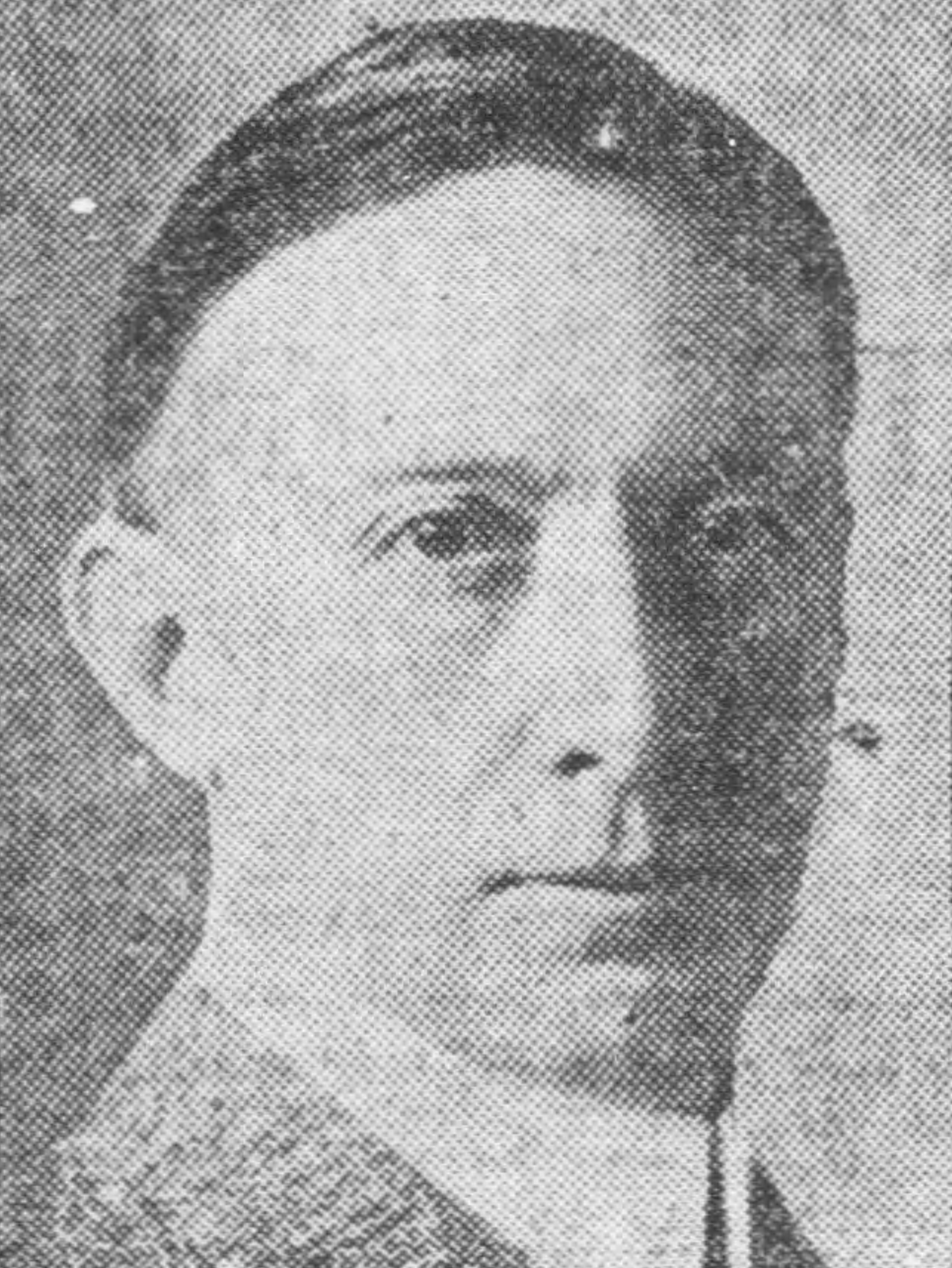
Thomas J. Kenny
(1913)

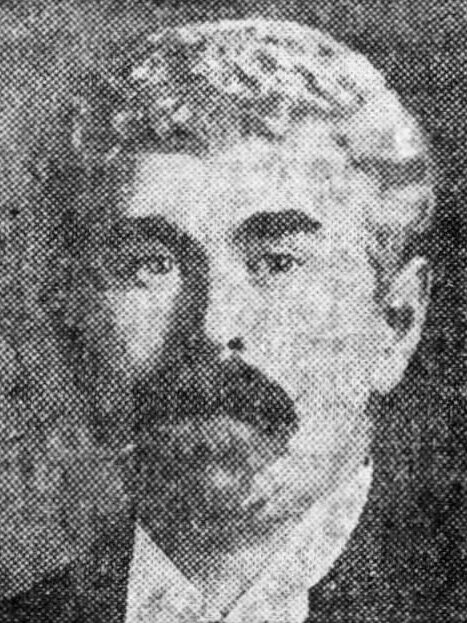
Henry E. Hagan
(1916)

James J. Storrow
(1917)

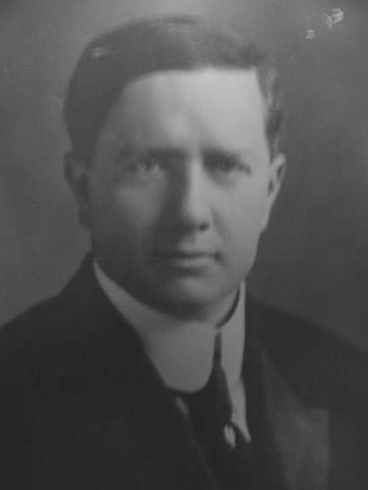
Walter L. Collins
(1918)

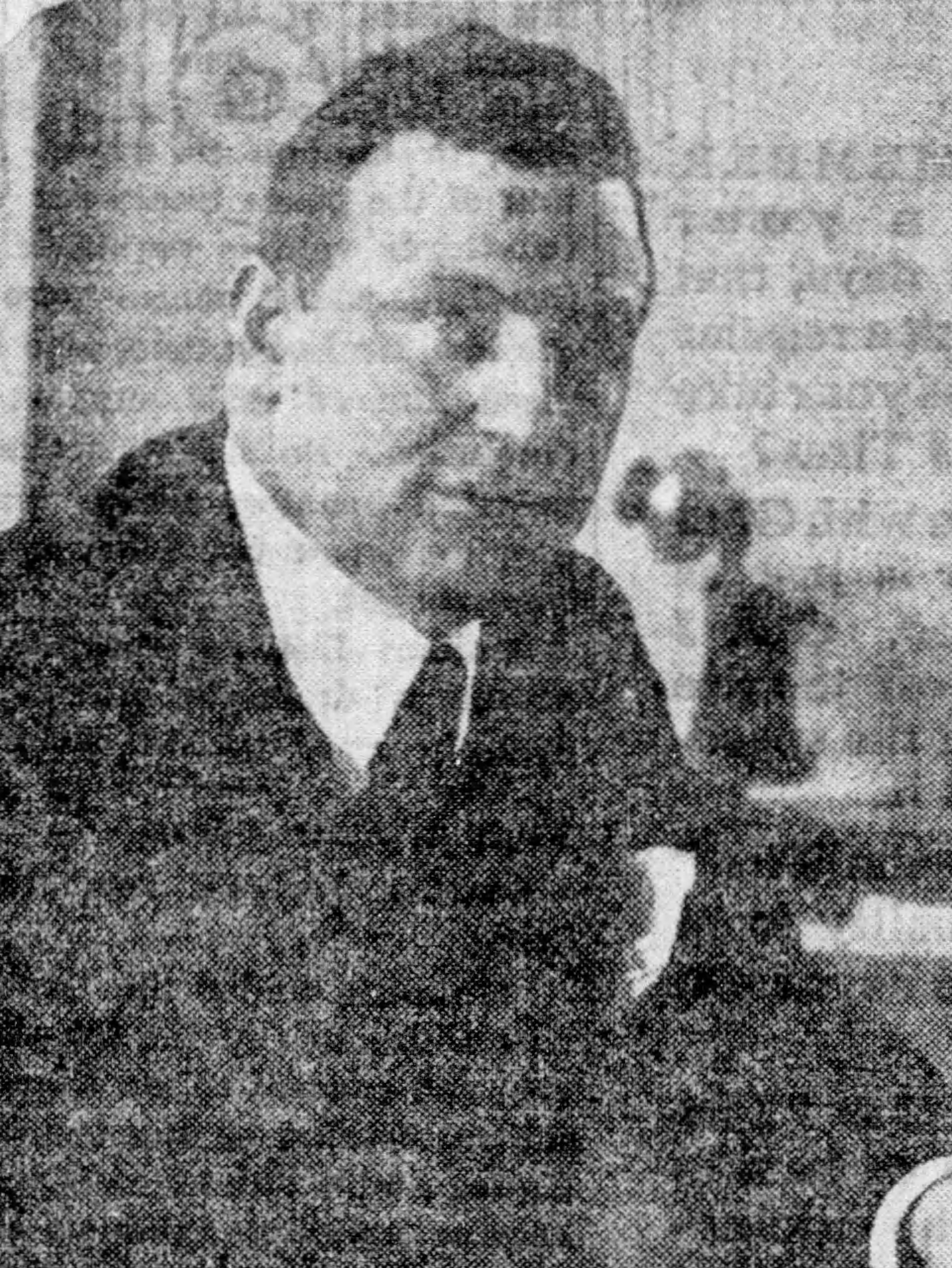
Francis Ford
(1919)

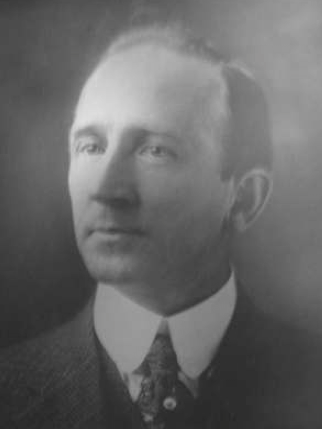
James T. Moriarty
(1920, 1925)

James A. Watson
(1921)

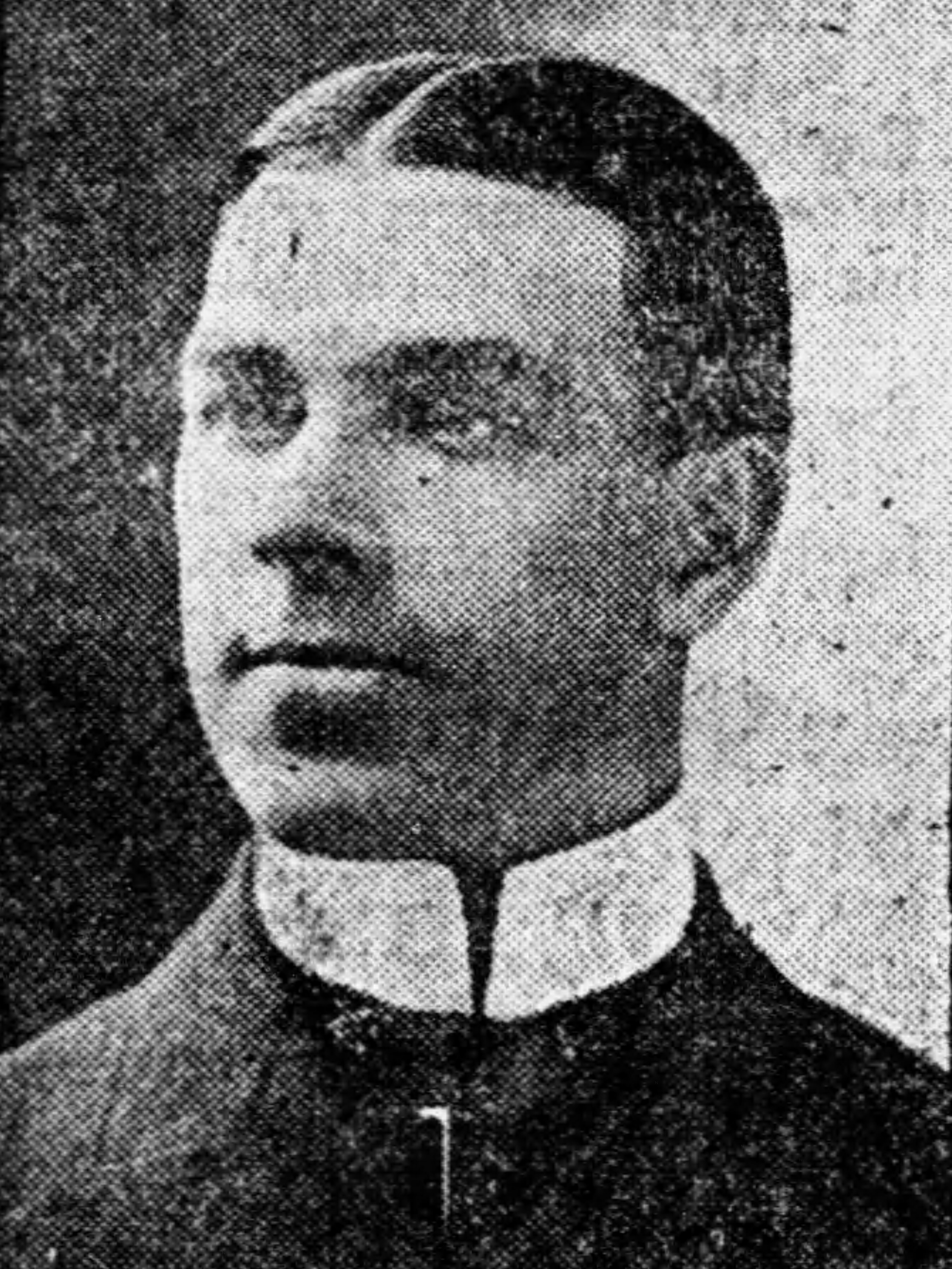
Daniel W. Lane
(1923)

John A. Donoghue
(1924)

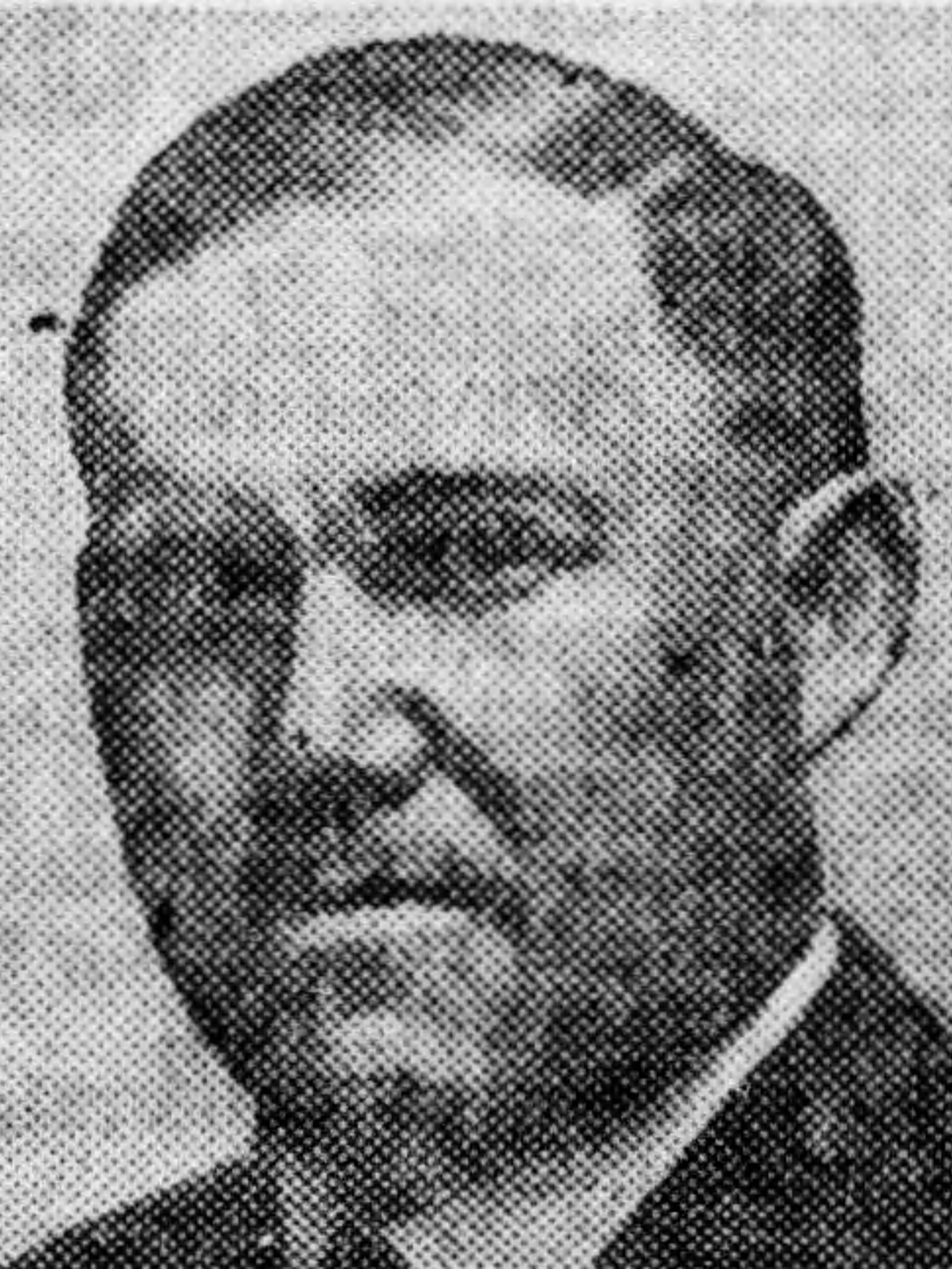
Charles G. Keene
(1926)

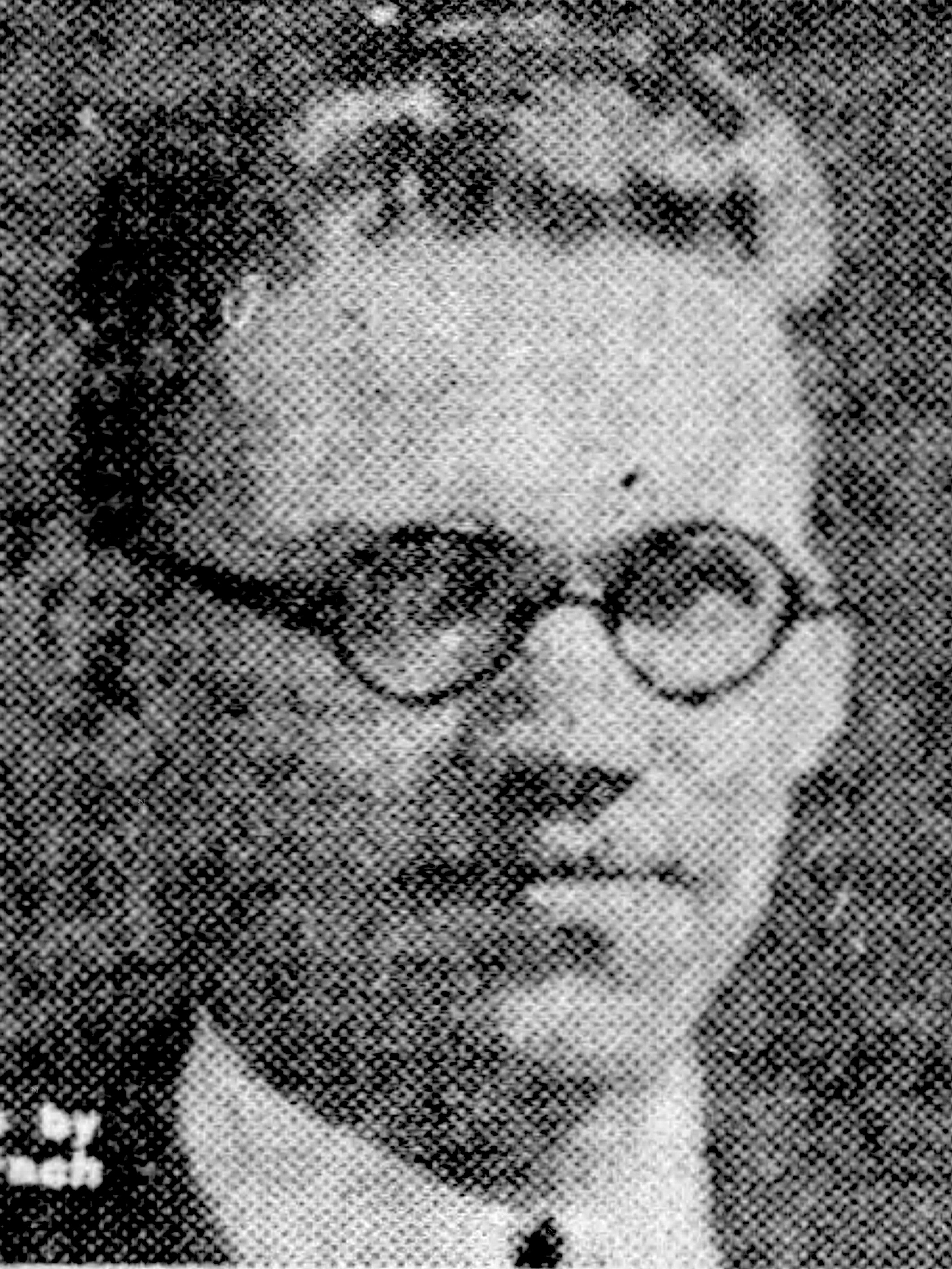
John J. Heffernan (1927)

Thomas H. Green
(1928)

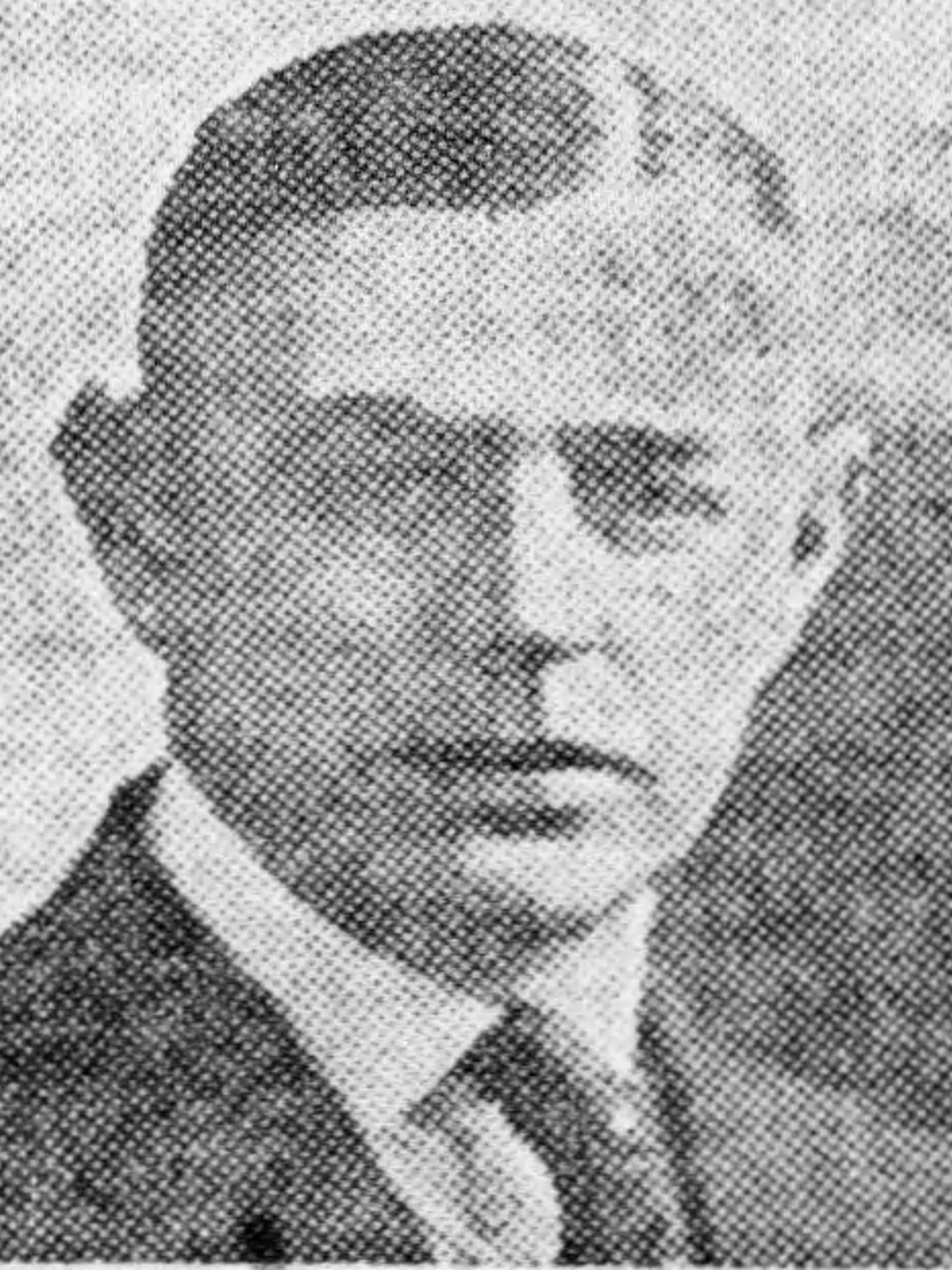
Timothy F. Donovan
(1929)

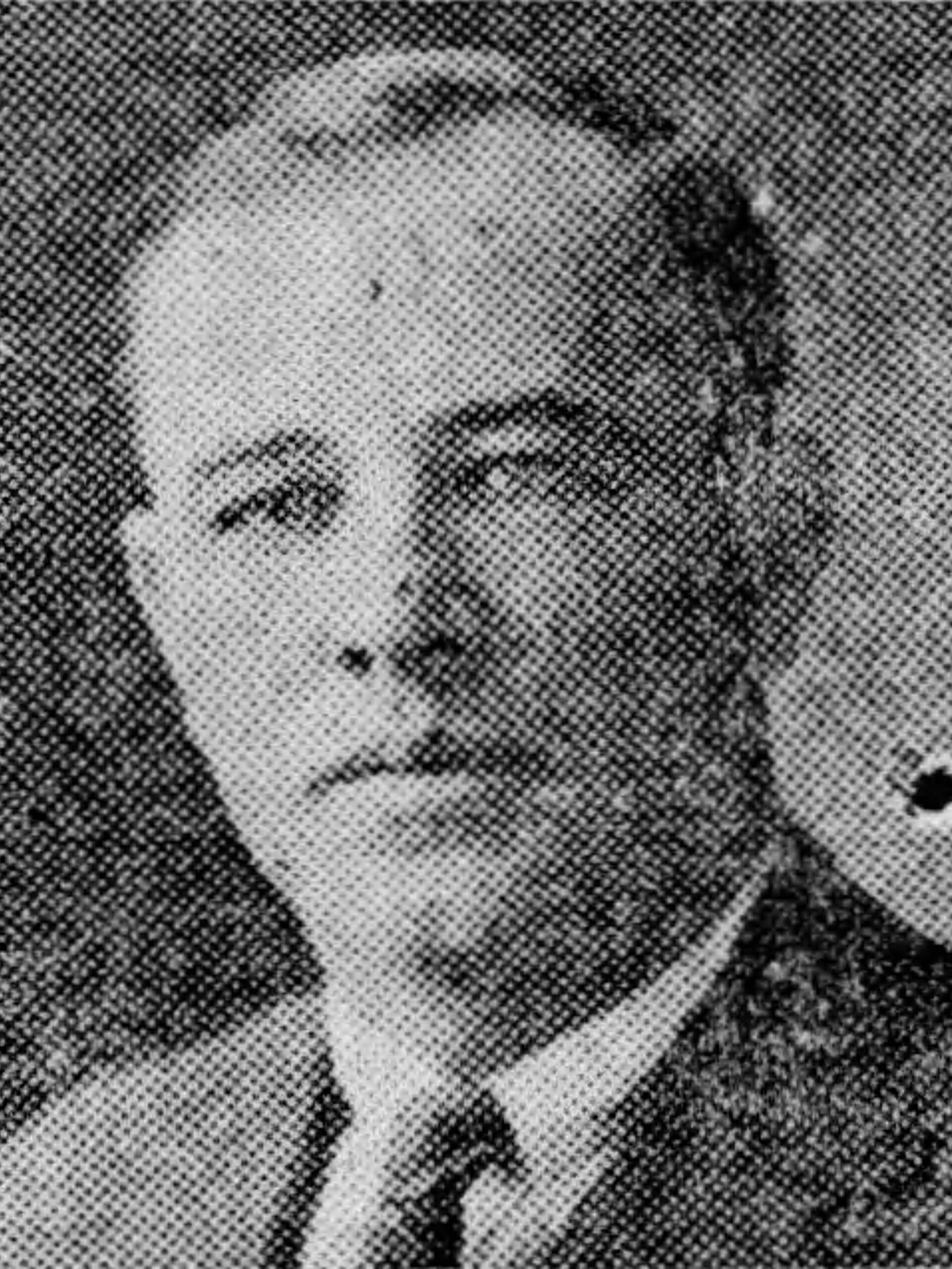
William G. Lynch
(1930)

Joseph McGrath
(1931, 1933)

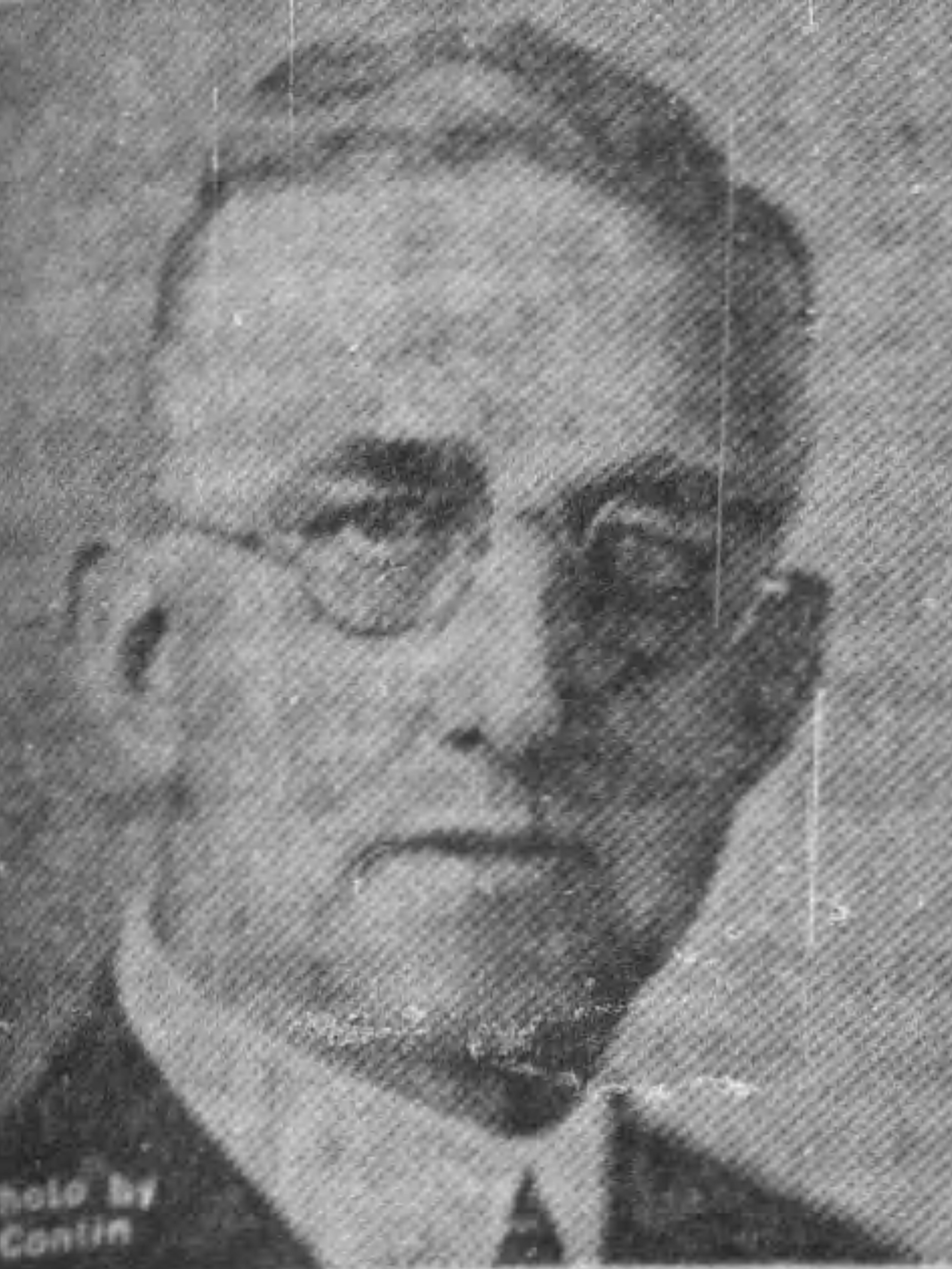
Edward M. Gallagher
(1932)

John F. Dowd
(1934)

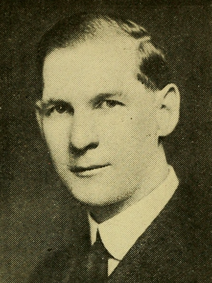
John I. Fitzgerald
(1935–1937)

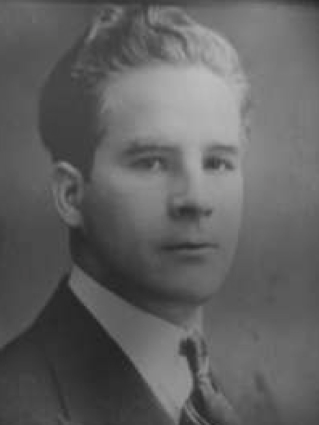
John E. Kerrigan
(1938, 1944–1945)

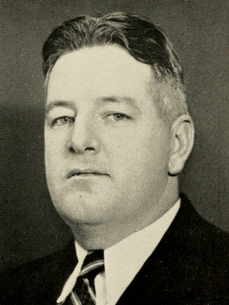
Thomas J. Hannon
(1943, 1948)

Gabriel Piemonte
(1952, 1957)

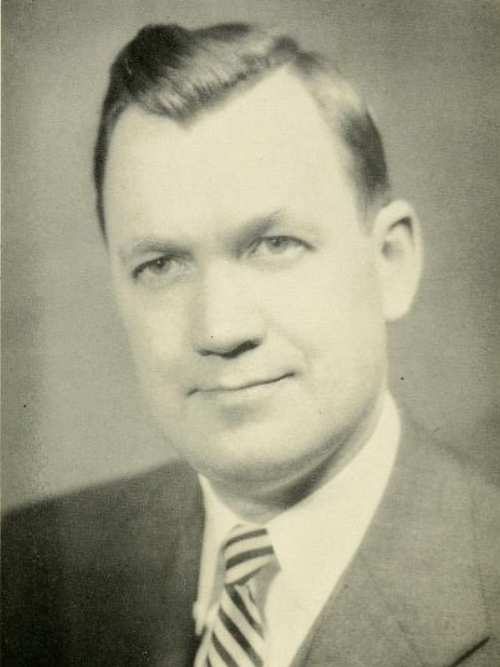
Francis X. Ahearn
(1953)

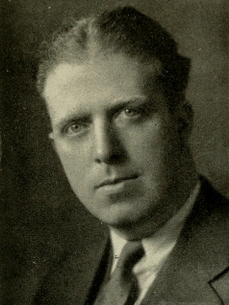
Joseph C. White
(1954)

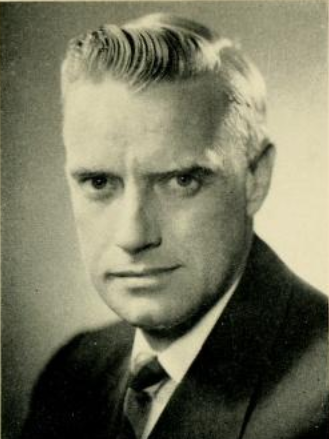
Edward J. McCormack Jr. (1956)

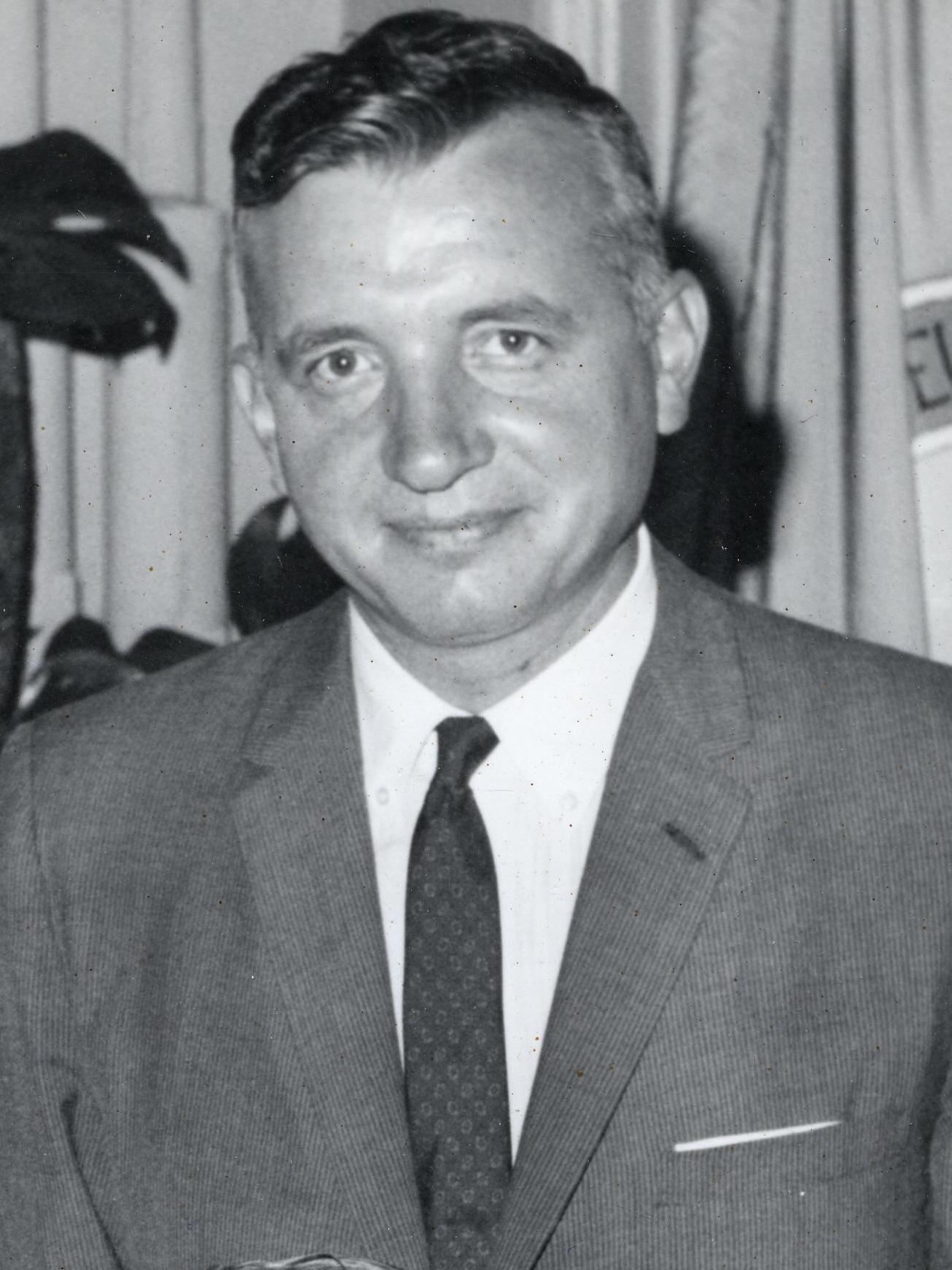
Patrick F. McDonough
(1958, 1961, 1973, 1981)

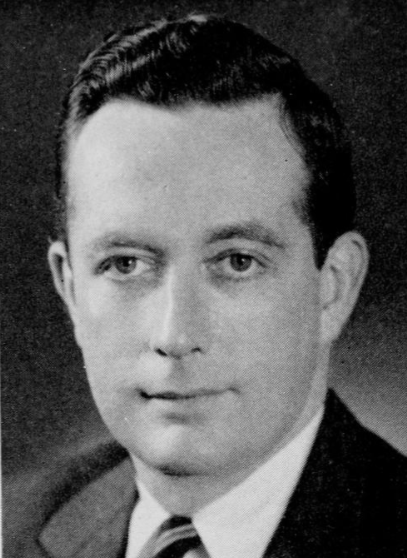
Edward F. McLaughlin Jr.
(1959–1960)

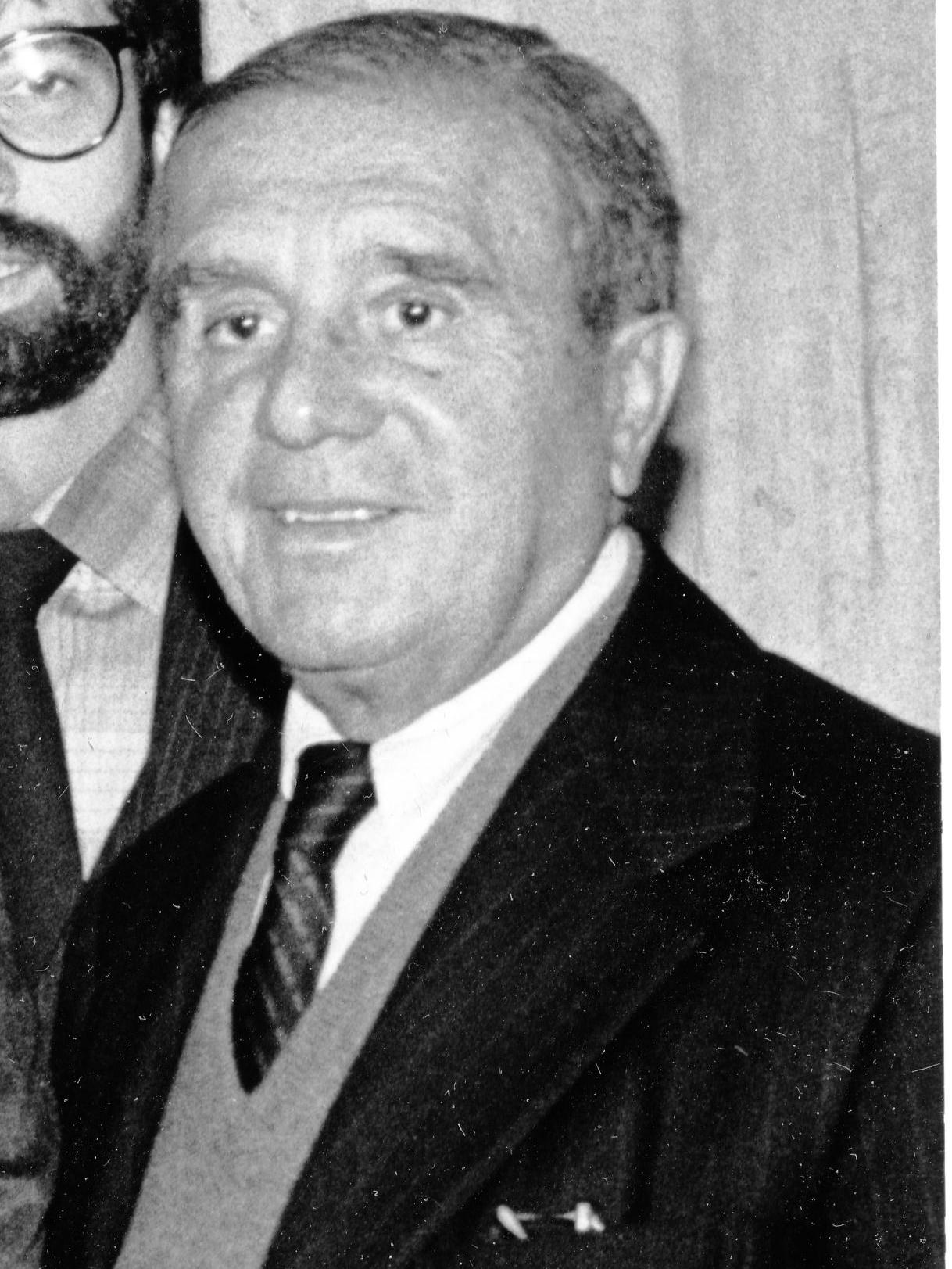
Christopher A. Iannella
(1962, 1980, 1982, 1988–1992)

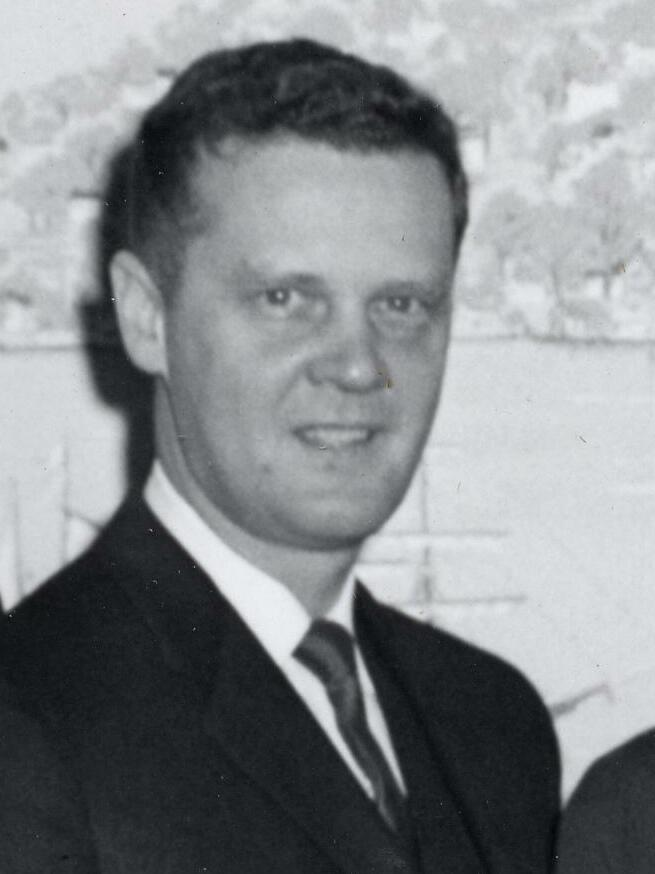
John J. Tierney
(1964–1965)

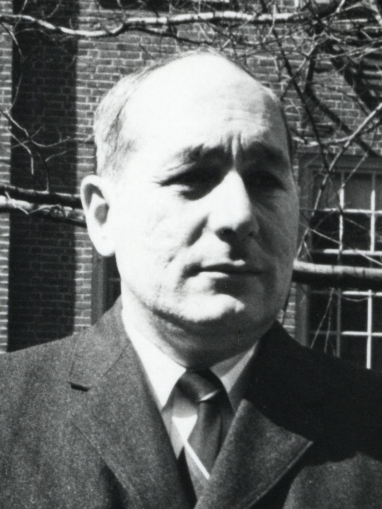
Frederick C. Langone
(1966)

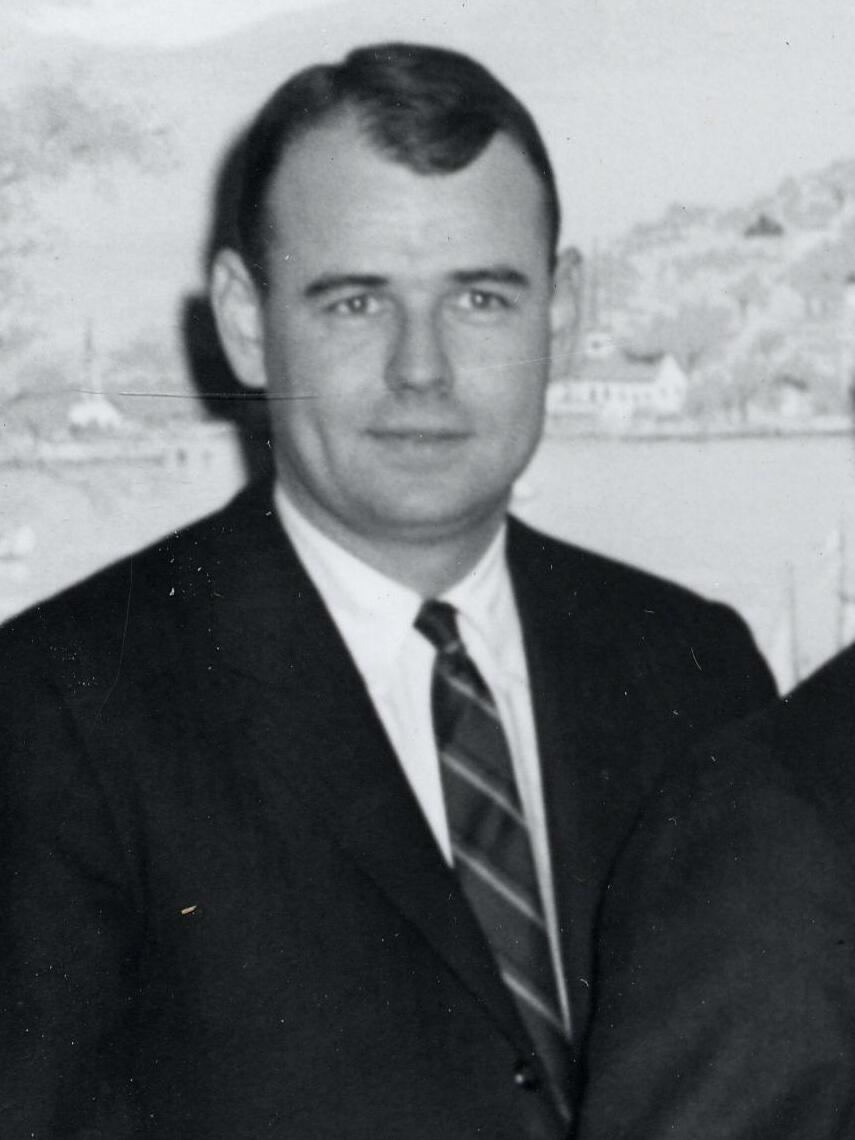
Barry T. Hynes
(1967)

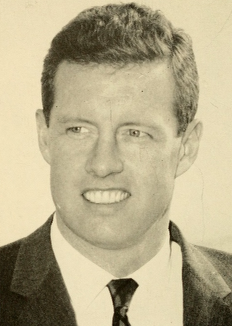
Gerald O'Leary
(1969, 1974–1975)

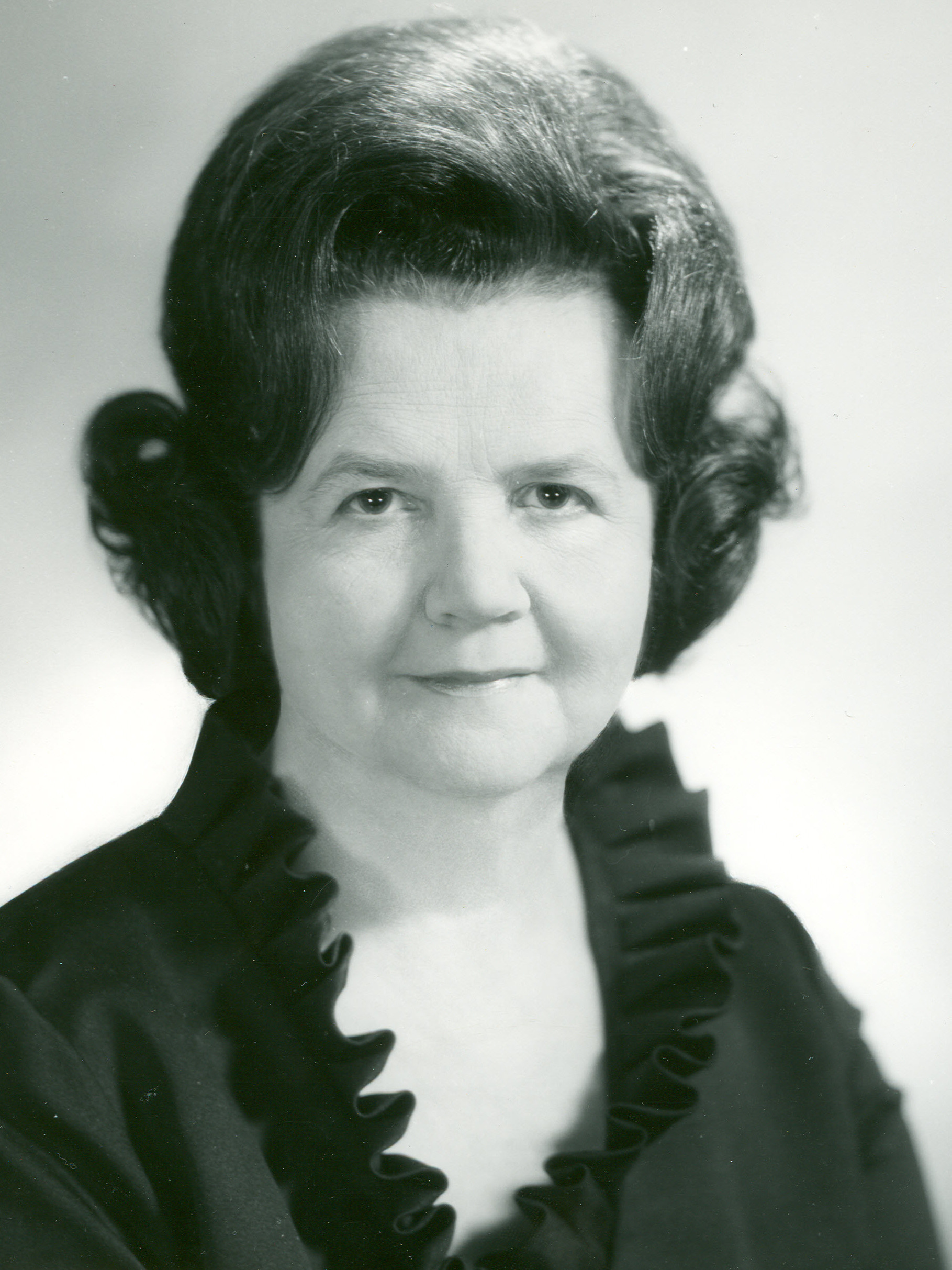
Louise Day Hicks
(1976)

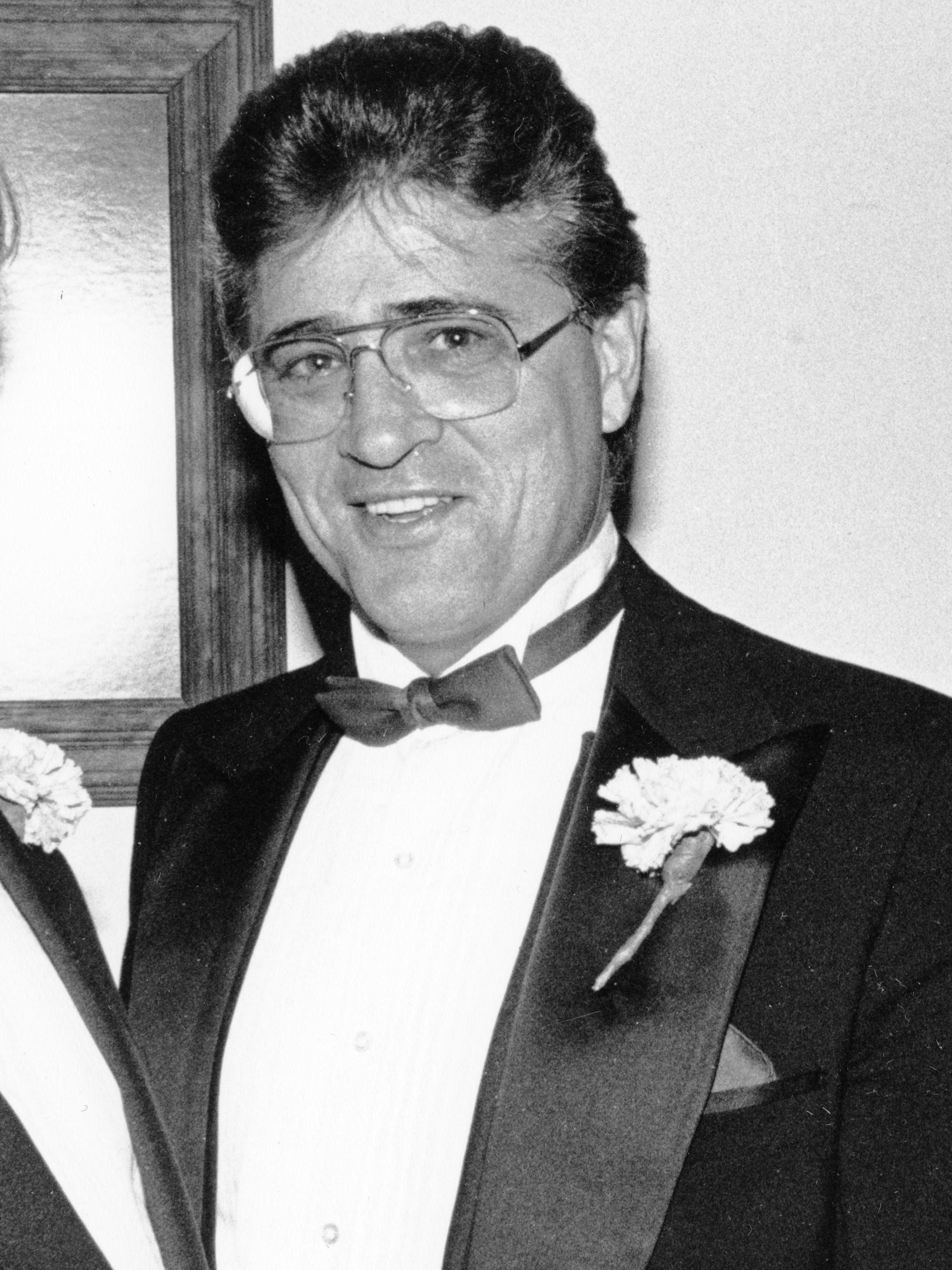
Joseph M. Tierney
(1977, 1979, 1983–1985)

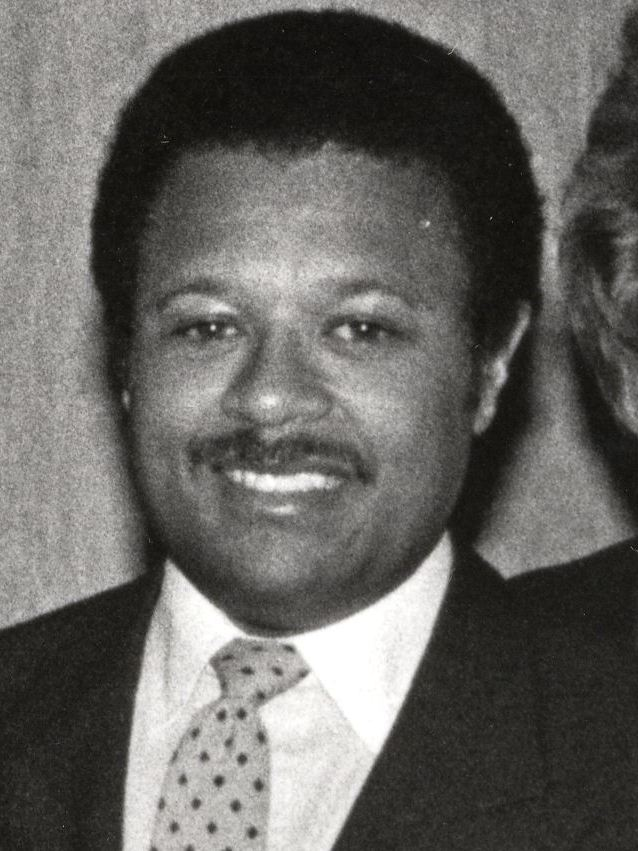
Bruce Bolling
(1986–1987)

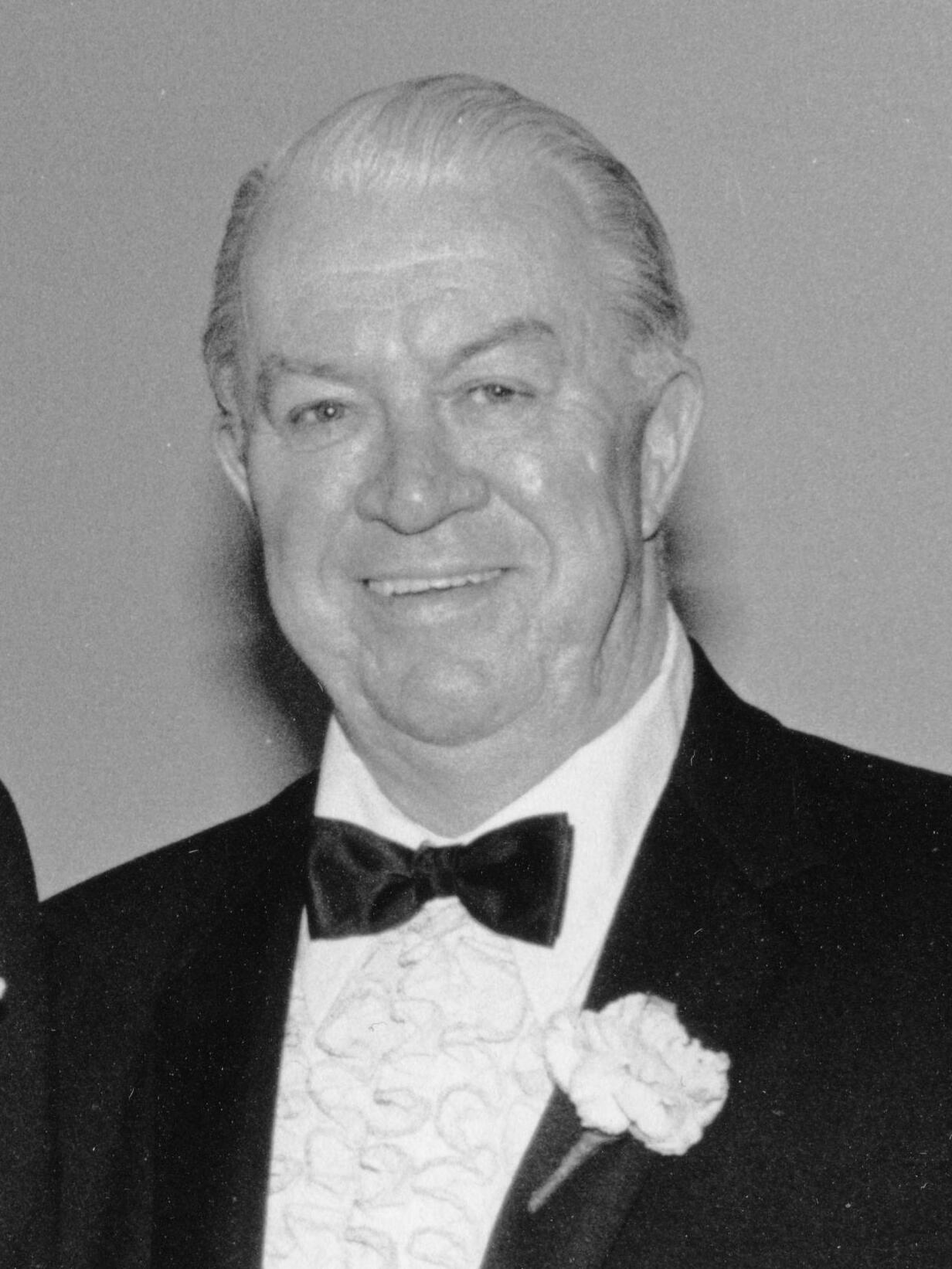
Dapper O'Neil
(1992)

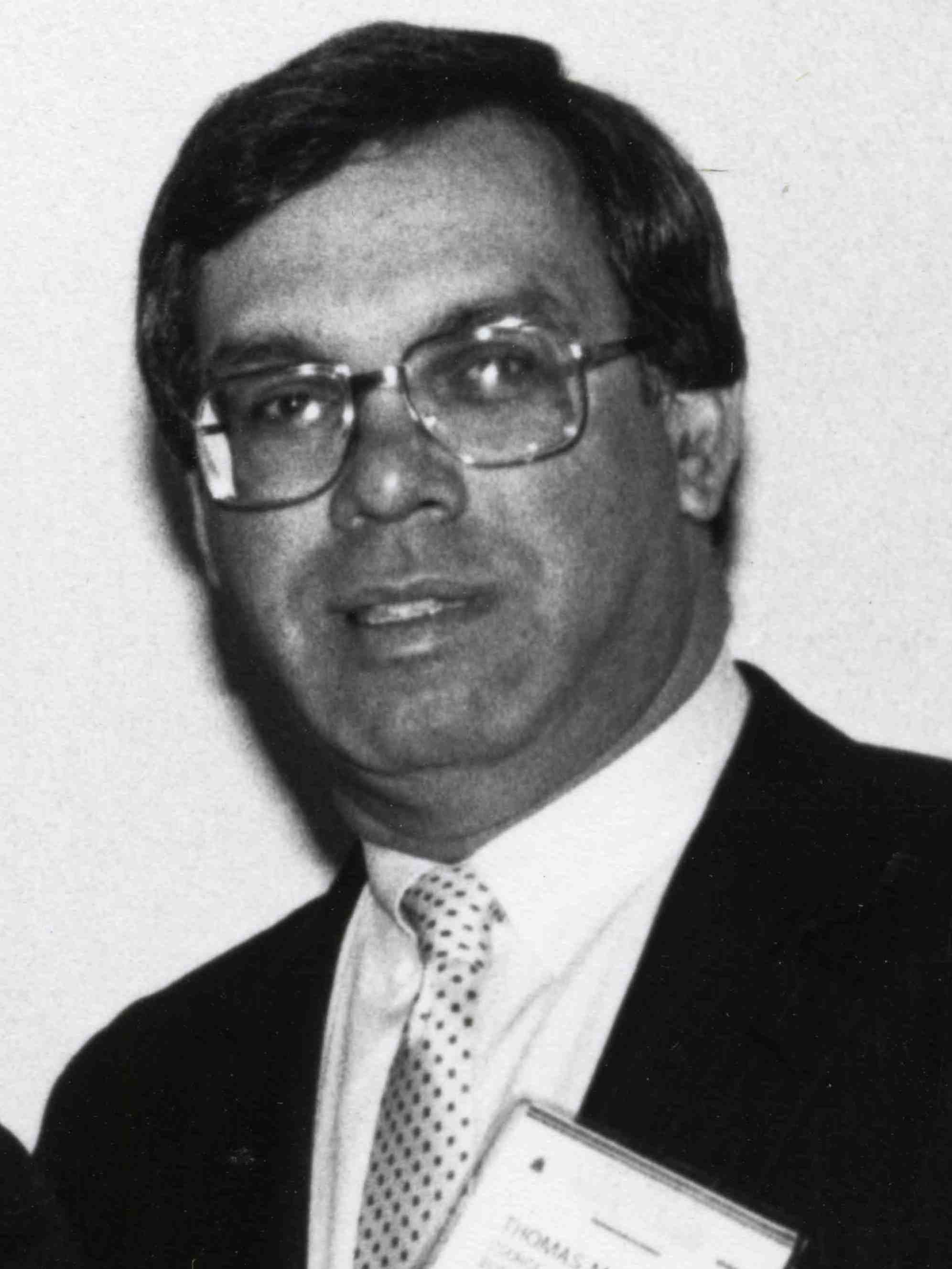
Thomas Menino
(1993)

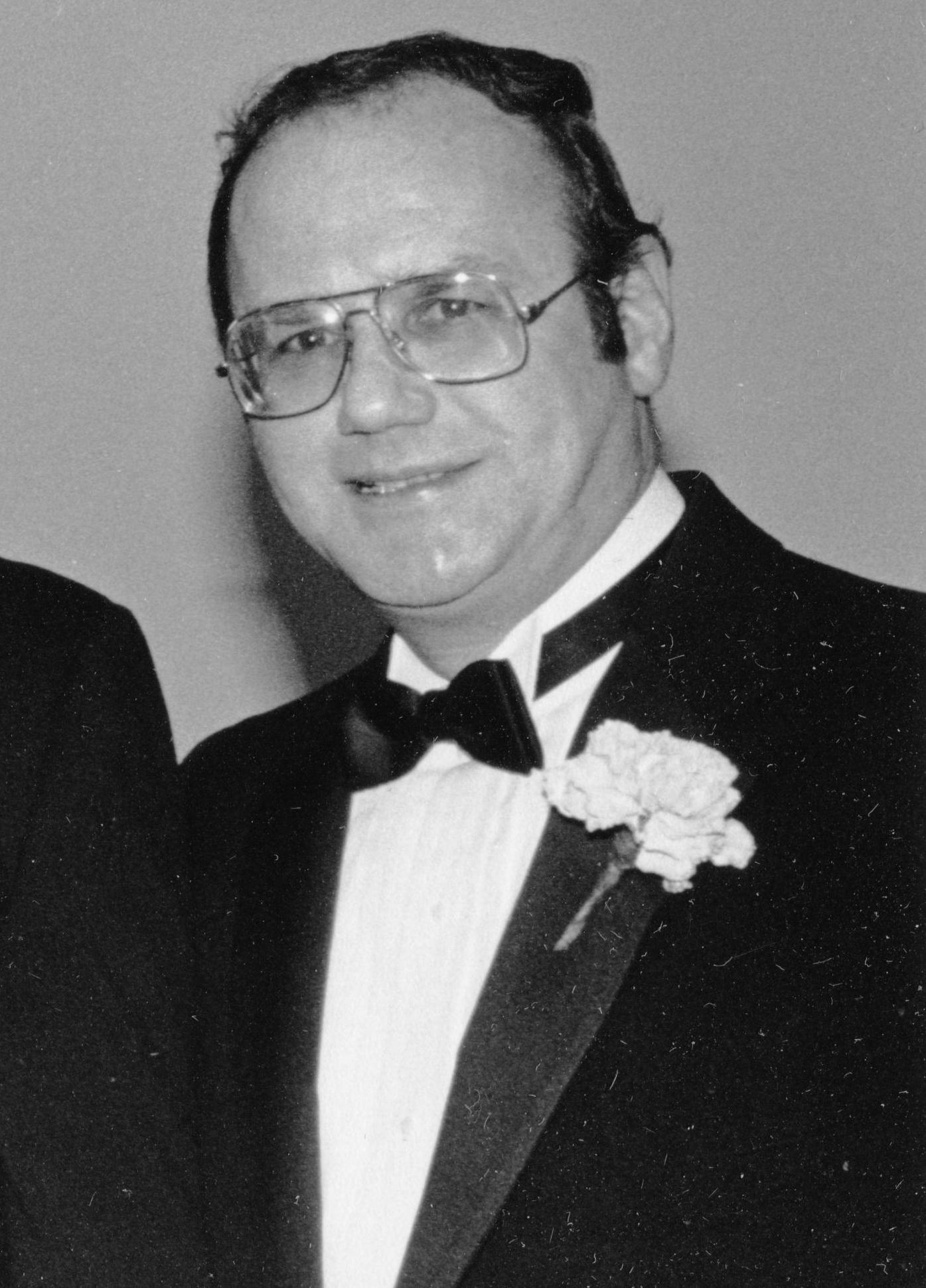
James M. Kelly
(1994–2000)

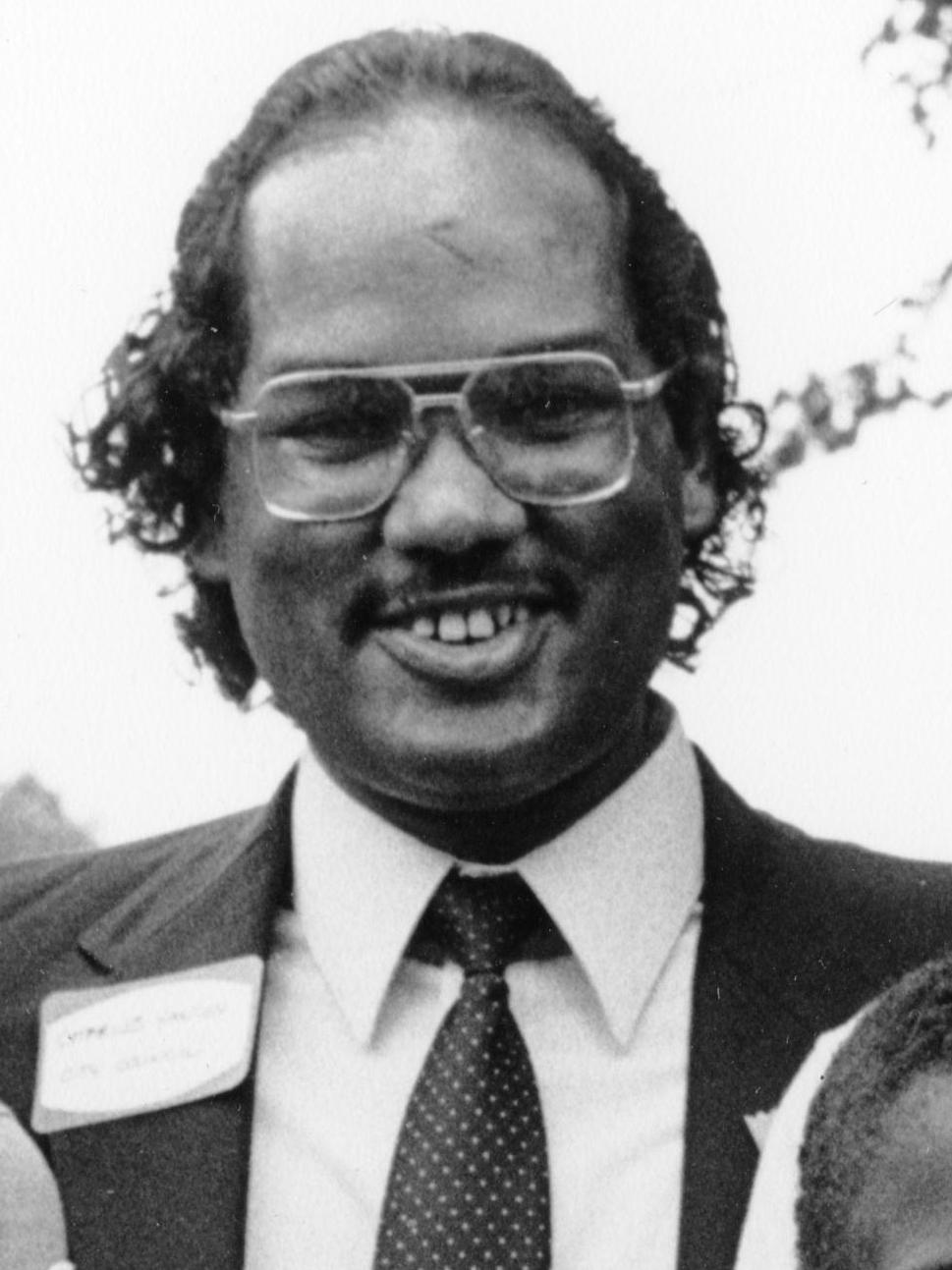
Charles Yancey
(2001)

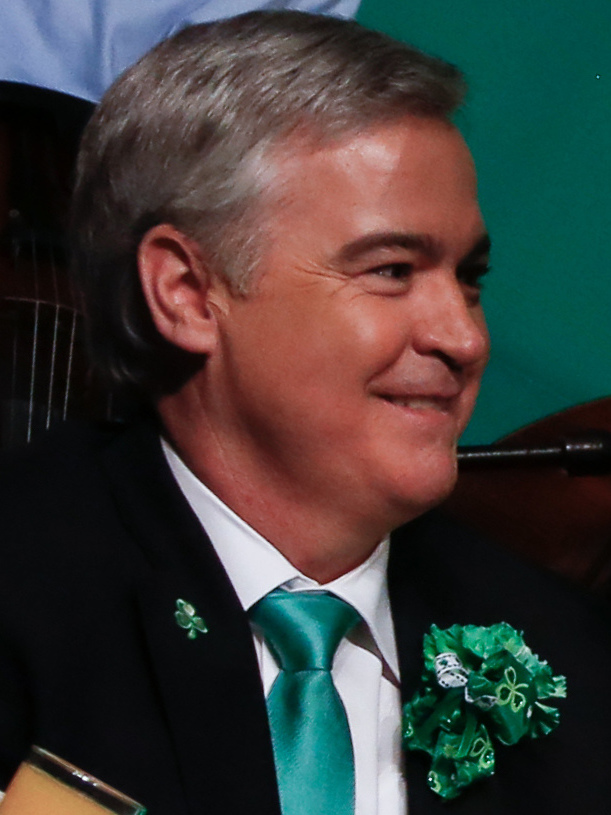
Michael F. Flaherty
(2002–2006)

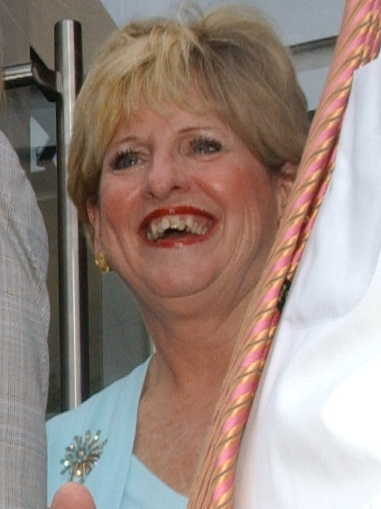
Maureen Feeney
(2007–2008)

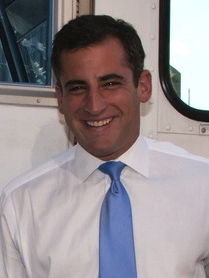
Michael P. Ross
(2009–2010)

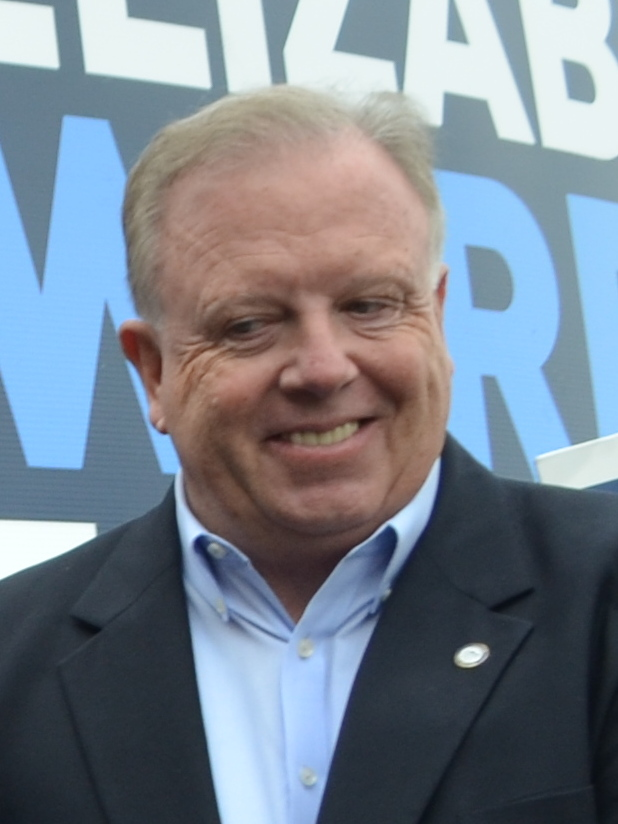
Stephen J. Murphy
(2011–2013)

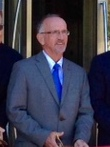
Bill Linehan
(2014–2015)

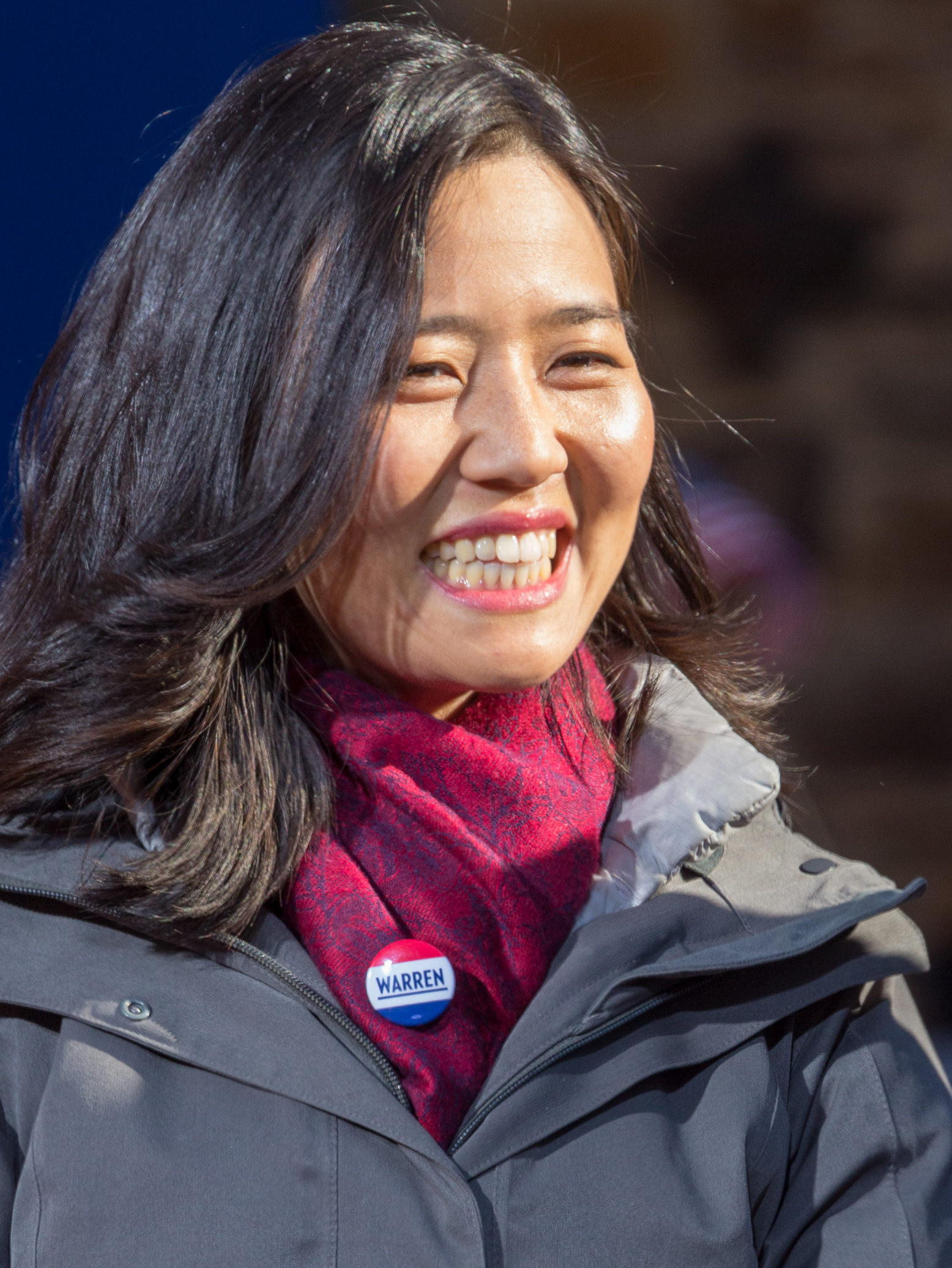
Michelle Wu
(2016–2017)

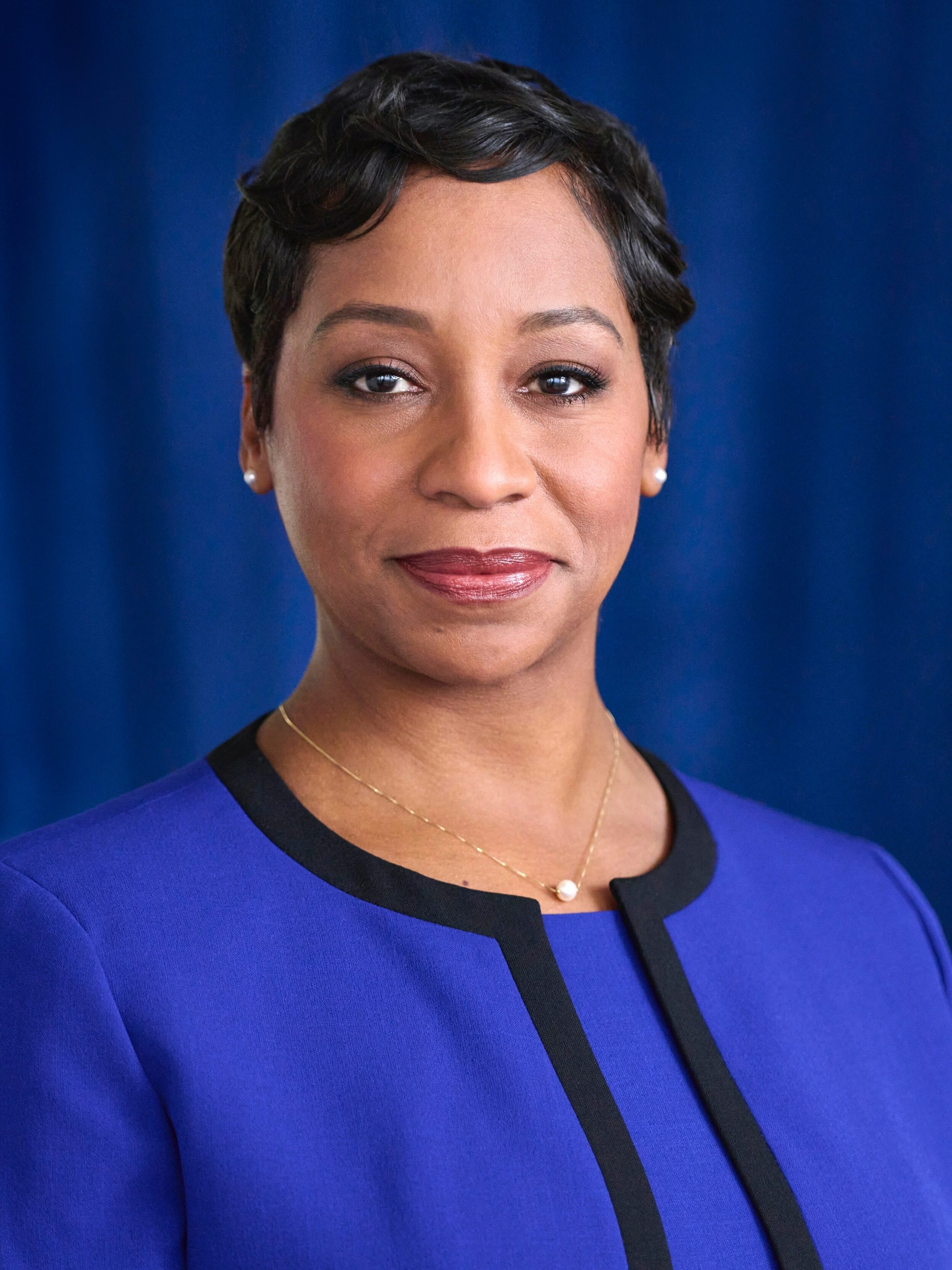
Andrea Campbell
(2018–2019)

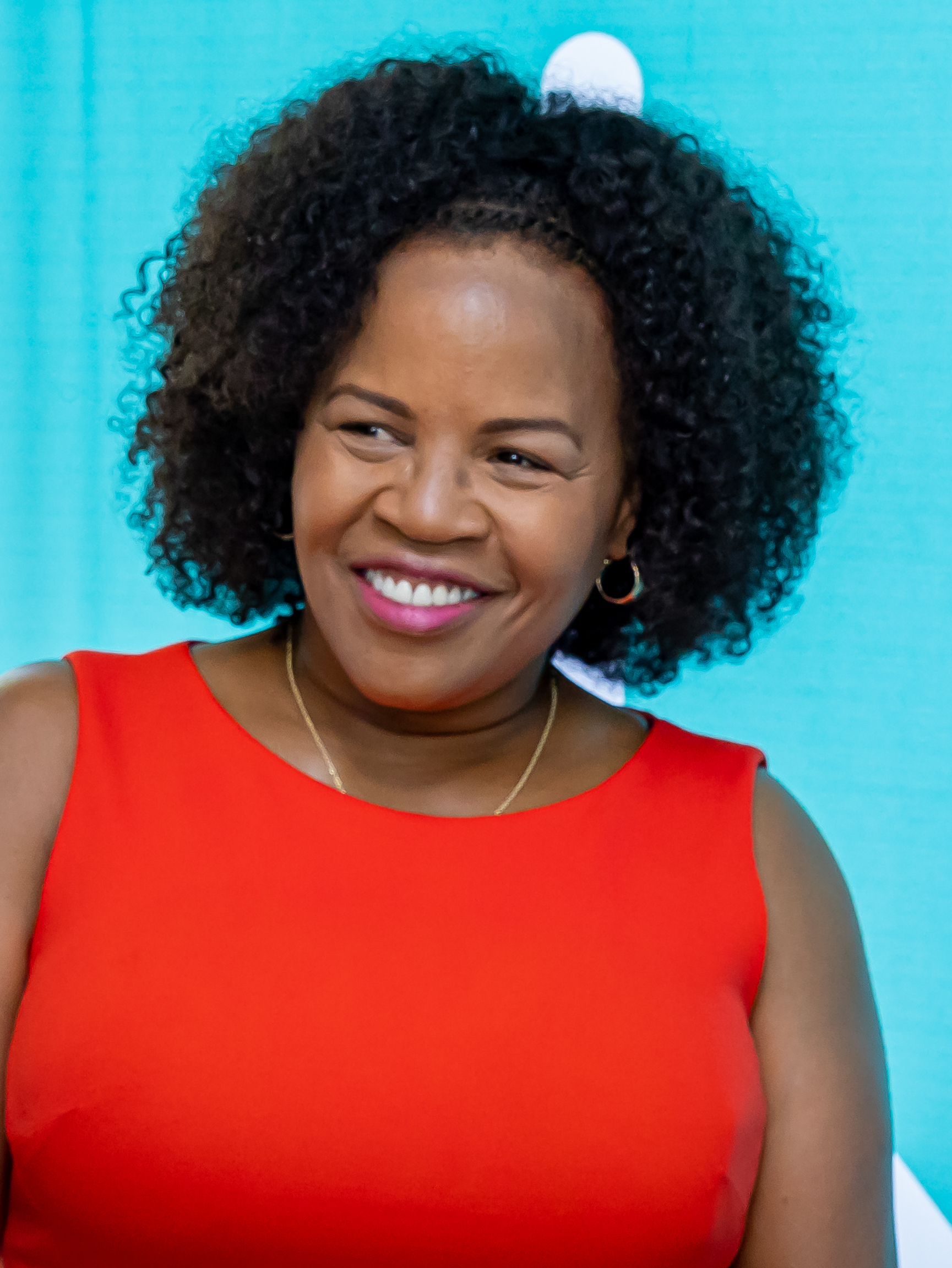
Kim Janey
(2020–2021)

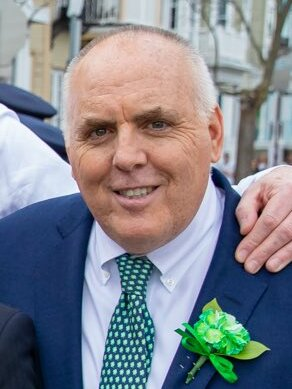
Ed Flynn
(2022–2023)

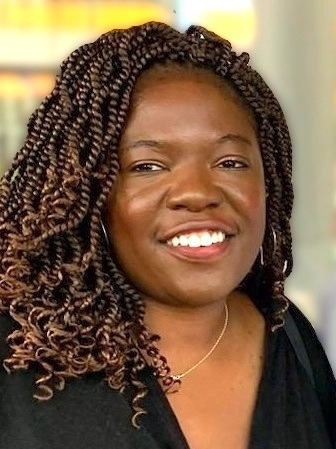
Ruthzee Louijeune (2024–2025)

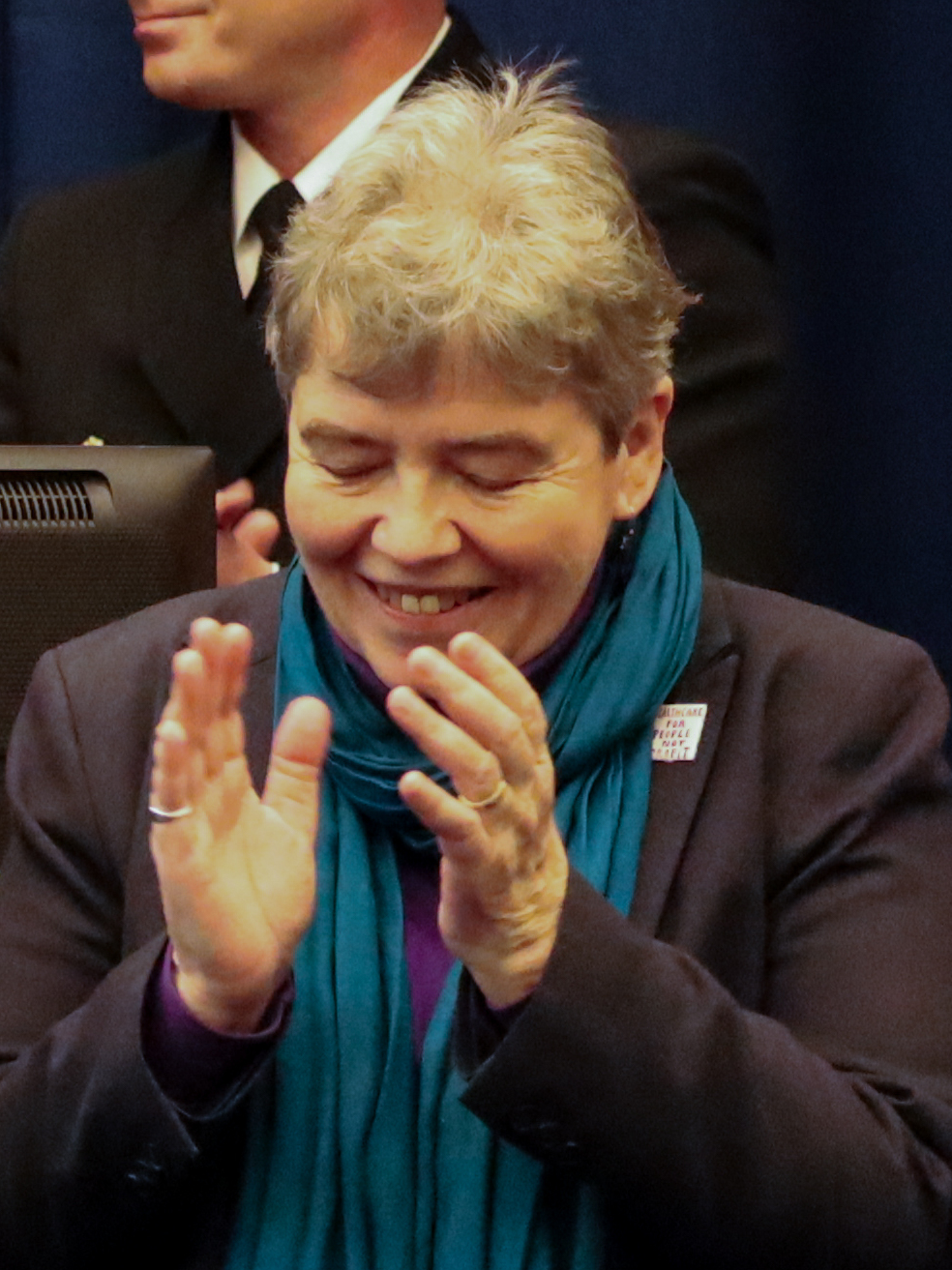
Liz Breadon (2026–present)

== Public records of Boston City Council ==
- City Departments' Annual Reports
- Complete stenographic machine record of the public meeting of Boston City Council
- Full text of Captions from Webcasts/Cablecasts of Boston City Council
- City Council page at boston.gov
  - Publications of Boston City Council
  - Communications of Boston City Council distributed by email
  - Communications of Council Committees

== See also ==
- List of members of the Boston City Council, 1822–present
- Boston Board of Selectmen, 1630s–1822
- Boston City Hall, seat of municipal government 1969–present
- Old City Hall (Boston), seat of municipal government 1865–1969
- Suffolk County Courthouse, seat of municipal government c. 1841–1865
- Old State House (Boston, Massachusetts), seat of municipal government c. 1830–1841
