= Gabriel Piemonte =

American attorney and politician

official portrait, 1947

Gabriel Francis Piemonte (January 28, 1909–June 30, 1991) was an American attorney and Democratic Party politician who was a member of the Massachusetts House of Representatives from 1947 to 1952 and several several terms on the Boston City Council between 1952 and 1974. He also ran unsuccessful campaigns for mayor of Boston in 1959 and 1963 and governor of Massachusetts in 1960.

== Early life and education ==
Gabriel Francis Piemonte was born on January 28, 1909 in Boston, Massachusetts. He was a native of the North End neighborhood. He was educated at Eliot Grammar School and English High School. He attended Suffolk University Law School.

In 1930, he established a legal practice in the North End.

== Political career ==
Piemonte served in the Massachusetts House of Representatives from 1947 through 1952, representing the 3rd Suffolk district.

=== Boston City Council ===
Piemonte served several nonconsecutive terms on the Boston City Council from 1952 until 1974, during which he made multiple unsuccessful campaigns for higher office.

In 1951, Piemonte was elected to the first nine-member City Council, following the reduction from twenty-two members. During his first year in office, Piemonte served as council president. He was elected after six ballots with support from Francis X. Ahern, Francis X. Joyce, and Joseph C. White. Incumbent president William F. Hurley was absent, vacationing in Florida, leaving Piemonte one vote short on the nine-member council. After Michael J. Ward and Frederick C. Hailer Jr. announced they would give Piemonte a majority, the election was made unanimous. His first term on the council also included an unsuccessful 1954 campaign for Suffolk County District Attorney.

His term in office ended with an unsuccessful campaign for mayor in 1959, in which in finished third, narrowly failing to advance to the runoff behind John Collins and John Powers.

After a further unsuccessful campaign for governor in 1960, he returned to the council in 1962, serving another term which ended in a second campaign for mayor in 1963. In 1963, he advanced to the runoff against the incumbent, Collins, but was defeated.

He served another term on the council from 1966 to 1968. His final term last from 1970 to 1974, and he served as council president again from 1970 to 1972. After retiring from the city council, he continued to practice law in the North End.

== Personal life and death ==
Gabriel Piemonte was married to Evelyn Penta, and had four children; one son and three daughters.

He died on June 30, 1991 in Boston.

== See also ==
- Massachusetts legislature: 1947–1948, 1949–1950, 1951–1952

Preceded by William F. Hurley; Gerald O'Leary	President of the Boston City Council; 1952; 1970–1972	Succeeded by Francis X. Ahearn; Patrick F. McDonough
