= Peter Paul (given names) =

Peter Paul is a male double name honouring Saints Peter and Paul. It may be treated as a single given name or as a first-name middle-name combination (in which case the bearer may go by a form of "Peter" — or "Paul" — rather than the double name). The corresponding name day is 29 June, the Feast of Saints Peter and Paul. The equivalent name in other languages is likewise a juxtaposition of the equivalents of the names Peter and Paul; in some languages the pair may be hyphenated (as French Pierre-Paul) or written solid (as Italian Pierpaolo; Pier Paolo and Pietro Paolo are also found in Italian).

People with the name(s) include:

- Peter Paul Althaus (1892–1965), German poet.
- Peter Paul Toney Babey or Peter Bobbeie (fl. 1849–1855), Mi'kmaw chief in Nova Scotia.
- Peter Paul Benazech (1744?–1783?), English engraver.
- Peter Paul Bergman (1939–2012), American writer and comedian.
- Peter Paul Borg (1843–1934), Maltese theologian.
- Peter Paul Brang (1852–1925), Viennese architect.
- Peter Paul Brauer (1899–1959), German film producer and director.
- Peter Paul Brennan (1941–2016), American Old Catholic bishop.
- Peter Paul Busuttil (1942/3–2017), mayor of Hal Safi, Malta.
- Peter Paul Montgomery Buttigieg (born 1982), American politician.
- Peter Paul Cetera (born 1944), American singer, songwriter, and bassist best known for being an original member of the rock band Chicago.
- Peter Paul Francis Degrand or P.P.F. Degrand (1787–1855) French-born broker and merchant in Massachusetts, U.S.
- Peter Paul Dobree (1782–1825), English classical scholar and critic.
- Peter Paul Felner (1884–1927), Austrian-Hungarian screenwriter and film director.
- Peter Paul Fernandes (1916–1981), Indian field hockey player.
- Peter Paul Fuchs (1916–2007), Austrian-born, U.S.-based conductor and composer.
- Peter Paul Gillen (1858–1896), South Australian storekeeper and Aboriginal rights activist.
- Peter Paul Gomez, (fl. 1955) Pakistani MP for East Bengal.
- Peter Paul Halajian (1864–1927), Armenian-American founder of Peter Paul Candy.
- Peter Paul Koprowski (born 1947), Polish-Canadian composer.
- Peter Paul Labertouche (1829–1907), British engineer and public servant in Melbourne, Australia.
- Peter Paul Lefevere (1804–1869), Belgian-American Catholic bishop.
- Peter Paul Mahoney (1848–1889), U.S. Representative from New York.
- Peter Paul Marshall (1830–1900), Scottish engineer and co-founder of the decorative arts firm Morris, Marshall, Faulkner.
- Peter Paul Mauser (1838–1914), German weapon designer and industrialist.
- Peter Paul Montgomery Buttigieg, commonly known as Pete Buttigieg, former mayor of South Bend, Indiana and 2020 Democratic presidential candidate
- Peter Paul Muller (born 1965), Dutch actor.
- Peter Paul Odhiambo (born 1937), Ugandan boxer at the 1964 Summer Olympics.
- Peter Paul Pillai (fl. 1885–1901), Indian National Congress representative for Tirunelveli.
- Peter Paul Prabhu (1931−2013), Indian Roman Catholic archbishop and diplomat.
- Peter Paul Pugin (1851–1904), English architect.
- Peter Paul Rubens (1577–1640), Flemish Baroque painter
- Peter Paul Saldanha (born 1964), Catholic bishop of Mangalore, India.
- Peter Paul Maria Alberdingk Thijm (1827–1904), Dutch academic and writer.
- Peter Paul Wiplinger (born 1939), Austrian writer and photographer.
- Peter Paul Wyngarde (1927–2018), British actor in television series Department S (1969–70) and Jason King (1971–72).

Fictional characters include:

- Peter Paul Gualtieri, known as "Paulie Walnuts", portrayed by Tony Sirico on the HBO series The Sopranos

== See also ==
- All pages with titles beginning with:;;;;;;;;
- Peter Paul (disambiguation)
- Peter and Paul (disambiguation)
