= Dixwell School =

School in Massachusetts, US

Dixwell's Private Latin School
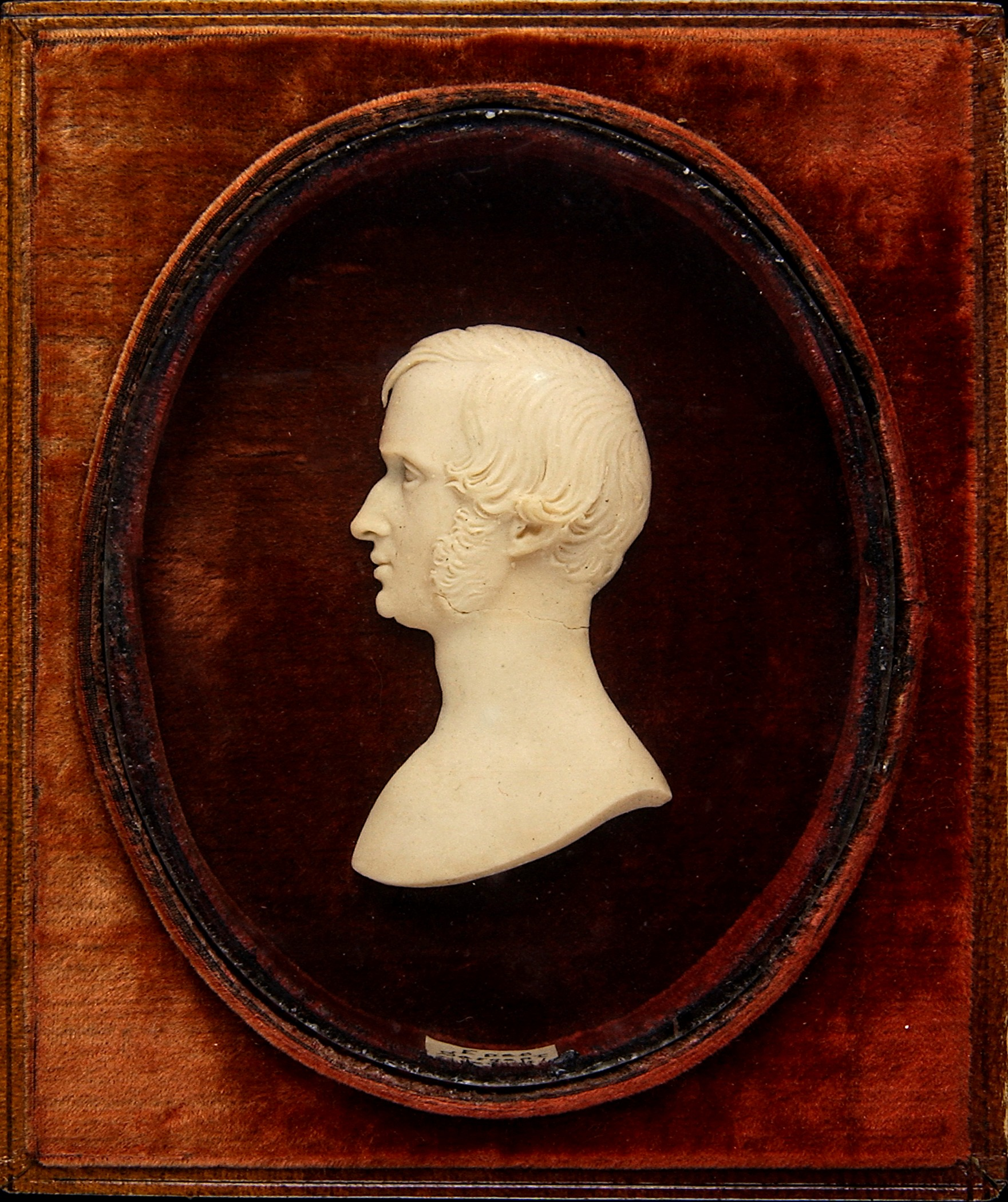
- Bas-relief of school founder Epes Sargent Dixwell, date unknown

Location
- 29 Chestnut Street; Boston, Massachusetts 02108; United States

Information
- Other name: Hopkinson School (1872–1905); Mr. Legate's Private Classical School (1905 – c. 1937)
- School type: Private; day; college-prep
- Established: 1851
- Founder: Epes Sargent Dixwell
- Closed: c. 1937
- Key people: John Prentiss Hopkinson; James Greenough; Arthur Volkmann; Burton John Legate
- Gender: All-boys

Dixwell's Private Latin School, also known as the Dixwell School and later renamed Hopkinson School and Legate's Private Classical School, was a college-preparatory school in Boston, Massachusetts, United States, which operated from 1851 to roughly 1937. It was one of America's first modern private day schools. During its heyday in the second half of the nineteenth century, Dixwell's was one of Harvard College's most important feeder schools. Its rise paralleled Harvard's transition from a training ground for clergymen to a socially elite institution primarily patronized by the sons of wealthy businessmen.

Dixwell's was closely associated with the Boston Brahmin elite. It trained many notable alumni, including Supreme Court justice Oliver Wendell Holmes Jr., Secretary of State Robert Bacon, Senator Henry Cabot Lodge Sr., Massachusetts Governor Roger Wolcott, and Pulitzer Prize-winning author Henry Adams.

The school's alumni made significant contributions to the development of tennis and American football. In 1876, Dixwell men organized and hosted the first American lawn tennis tournament. The school produced many of the sport's first American stars, including Richard Dudley Sears, Malcolm Whitman, and James Dwight. Dixwell students were the primary force behind the Oneida Football Club, the first organized American football team. Other athletes include two-time Olympic gold medalist Ellery Harding Clark and 1920 America's Cup-winning skipper Charles Francis Adams III.

== Background ==
=== Latin schools, academies, and public schools ===
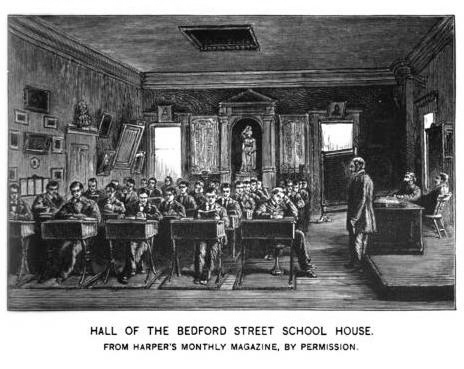
Epes Dixwell ran Boston Latin School, the nation's oldest public school, from 1836 to 1851. During his tenure, BLS moved into a new facility on Bedford Street.

Until the second half of the nineteenth century, American secondary education was divided into two tracks: classical-ministerial and business-vocational. In the seventeenth century, when the first secondary schools were set up in the colonies, "preparation for college ... was practically preparation for the ministry." At the time, ministers were expected to learn Latin and Greek. The colleges refused to admit students who had not studied those subjects. As a result, aspiring college students were generally channeled to Latin schools and grammar schools.

The primary alternative to the Latin school was the academy, which offered Latin and Greek courses for college-bound students but also included topics practical for non-clerics who were not interested in college, like mathematics, English, and French. Academies were principally set up in the countryside to educate students from the surrounding area in lieu of a public school. In some cases, they were chartered and subsidized by the state, and acted as predecessors of county high schools. Academies such as Phillips Andover and Phillips Exeter largely displaced the old Latin schools. By the 1850s, only a few Latin schools remained, mainly in the larger cities. One surviving classical school was Boston Latin School (BLS), which eventually gave rise to Dixwell's.

Starting around 1850, the rise of free, taxpayer-funded public high schools largely displaced the academies' role as vocational educators. This process picked up at the turn of the twentieth century. In 1889, 31.87% of American high school students went to private school. By 1912, public school enrollment rose fivefold. Although private school enrollment grew in absolute terms, its share of the industry shrank to 11.55%.

=== Admissions requirements at Harvard College ===
In the nineteenth century, Harvard College grew secular and wealthy. As early as the 1830s, Harvard-watchers noticed that Harvard's student body was trending socially elite and exclusive. Dixwell alumnus Henry Adams wrote that when he attended Harvard in the 1850s, the Boston elite was already "sending their children to Harvard College for the sake of its social advantages." George Santayana graduated from Harvard in 1886 and called the new Harvard a "seminary and academy for the inner circle of Bostonians."

These changes disrupted Harvard's curriculum, but not its admissions practices. The sons of wealthy businessmen often went into business themselves, and to cater to these students, Harvard modified its curriculum to teach "mercantile and active" subjects. From 1798 to 1830, 24% of Harvard students went into the ministry and 17% into business. The professions of law and medicine were also popular. From 1835 to 1860, ministry and business' shares of graduates flipped to 9% and 24%, respectively. As a result of these changes, some members of the Harvard community protested that Latin and Greek had little direct practical utility for the modern Harvard student. Even so, Harvard continued to require applicants to study both Latin and Greek until 1887.

In fact, in the first half of the nineteenth century, Harvard tightened its admission requirements, which still prioritized Latin and Greek. Students "began to fail the [entrance] examination in significant numbers" starting in the 1830s. Applicants began spending more time in secondary school to prepare for Harvard, and the average age of matriculants increased from 15.5 in 1810 to 17.5 in 1850. Harvard's selectivity advanced in tandem with its social stature.

Ronald Story of the University of Massachusetts attributes Harvard's decision to changes in its governance, which allowed Boston's commercial elite to influence Harvard's admissions requirements, while at the same time generously funding high schools whose curricula were tailored to those requirements. Around this time, the Boston elite was bankrolling a wide range of cultural institutions, including the universities, the Boston Public Library, and the Harvard Museum of Natural History. In 1892, the New York Tribune discovered that a third of Boston's millionaires had Harvard degrees.

Critics protested that the stricter requirements favored students at the leading prep schools, such as BLS, Roxbury Latin, Exeter, Andover, and Round Hill. By contrast, the new crop of public schools generally lacked the resources to employ a classics teacher.

== History ==
=== Founding a new school ===
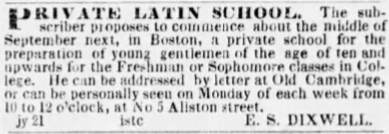
In his opening advertisement of July 21, 1851, Dixwell announced his intent to educate "young gentlemen." He published the ad in the Boston Evening Transcript, the favored newspaper of the Boston upper class.

Epes Sargent Dixwell attended Boston Latin School (BLS) and Harvard College, graduating from the latter in 1827. After briefly practicing as a lawyer, he became the BLS headmaster in 1836. At BLS, he taught Charles W. Eliot, the future president of Harvard University, and folklorist Francis James Child. He reportedly loaned Child the money to attend Harvard.

In the early 1850s, the City of Boston attempted to cut off city services to families who did not pay property taxes to the city. It ordered employees to move to Boston or quit. It also banned suburban students from attending BLS. Dixwell lived in Cambridge and refused to move. As a result, in 1851, Dixwell left BLS to start a new private school at 2 Boylston Place, near Boston Common and Piano Row. Financial concerns may have also played a role in the move, as Dixwell complained that the City had underpaid him in the past. He ran his new school as a for-profit enterprise, and boasted that running a private school paid better.

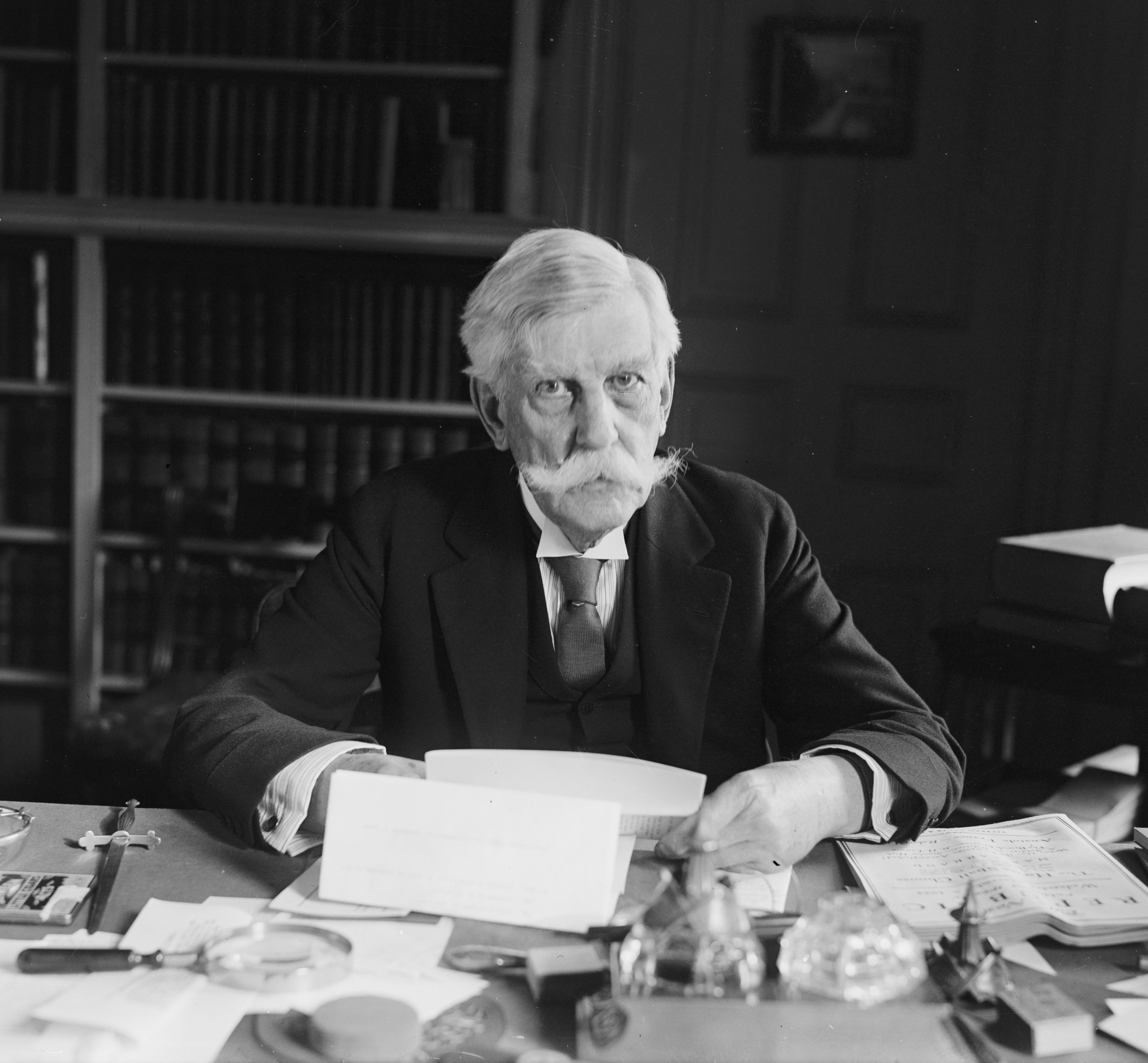
Supreme Court justice Oliver Wendell Holmes Jr. was one of the Dixwell School's first students and its most eminent alumnus. He later married E.S. Dixwell's daughter.

The Private Latin School opened on September 29, 1851, with thirty boys. In a stroke of luck, two of Dixwell's first students were also two of his most famous. Henry Adams attended Dixwell's because his suburban address prevented him from attending BLS. Oliver Wendell Holmes Jr.'s father Oliver Wendell Holmes Sr. picked the brand-new Dixwell School due to his disapproval of Dixwell's replacement at BLS.

Pedagogically, the school's curriculum was "based entirely on the entrance requirements of Harvard"—that is, the classics. Dixwell liked science and co-founded the American Association for the Advancement of Science in 1848. Even so, when Henry Cabot Lodge Sr. attended Dixwell's in the 1860s, the curriculum focused on Latin and Greek, and also included some mathematics, French, and classical history. Lodge was a mostly-indifferent student in high school, and quipped that to Dixwell, "anything of modern history or of the history of our own country was thought quite needless." Dixwell had some outright critics, including BLS alumnus Charles Francis Adams, who hated Dixwell's BLS and called it a "conventional, mechanical, low-standard day-school and classical grind-mill." However, the system achieved its intended purpose. Dixwell claimed that only one of his students ever failed the Harvard entrance exam, and that student got in on the second attempt.

=== Wealth, influence, and relationship with Harvard ===
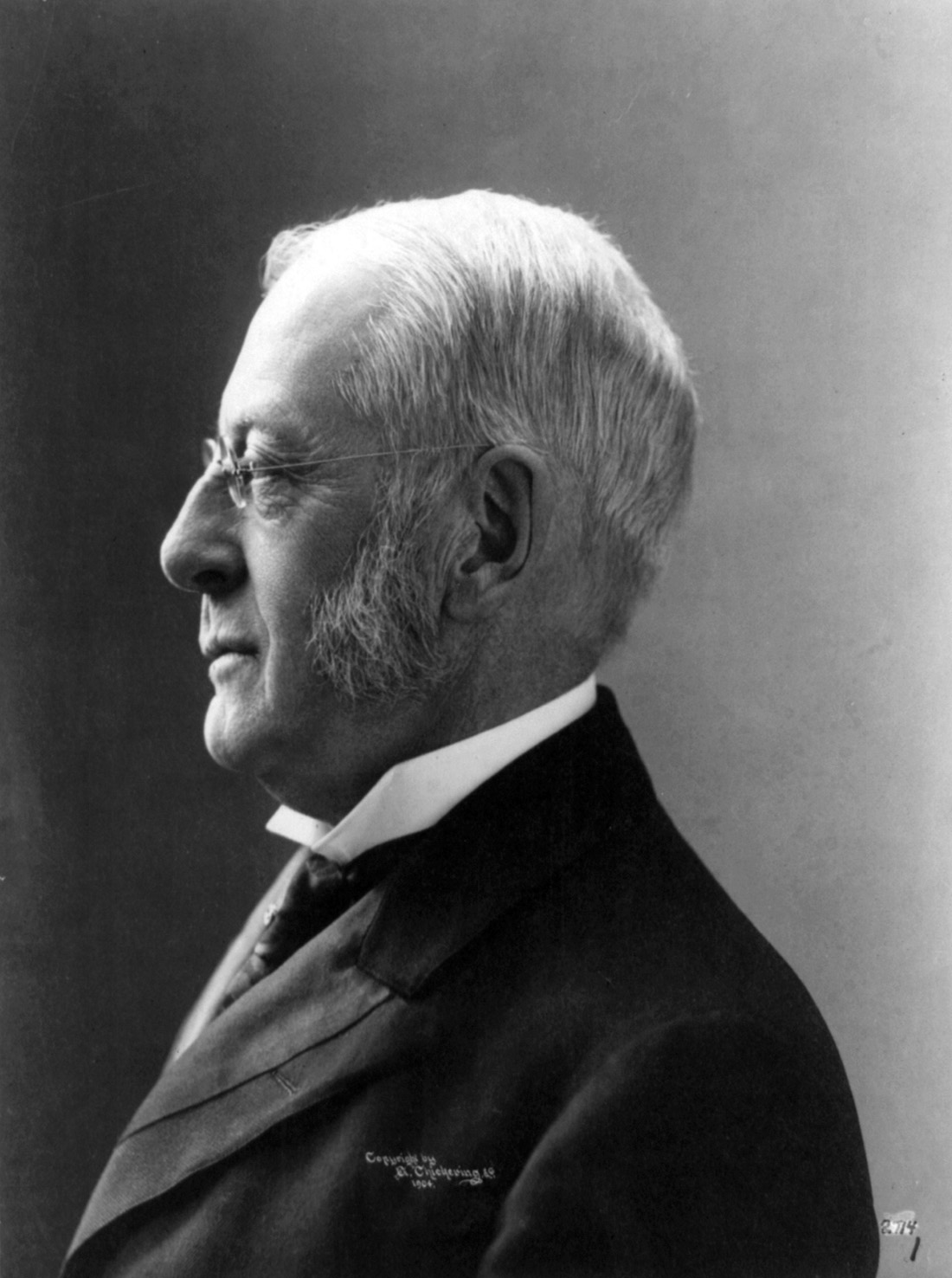
Harvard University president Charles William Eliot and his family were closely associated with the school. E.S. Dixwell was Eliot's old teacher, and Eliot sent his son to the school.

Dixwell's Boston Latin student Charles W. Eliot remembered the Dixwell School as the start of a new "epoch in the development of secondary education in the city of Boston." Dixwell responded to several major changes in American education and upper-class tastes: the relocation of wealthy men like Dixwell to the suburbs, the rise of college as a socially advantageous training ground for secular careers, and Harvard's decision to retain its increasingly obsolete, Latin-focused admissions criteria even as it gradually secularized its curriculum. Dixwell was not the first man who tried to provide an expensive college-preparatory classical education outside the public school system. However, he was arguably the first teacher to do so successfully, and he paved the way for similar private prep schools.

Dixwell's BLS was a case in point. In Dixwell's day, BLS was itself deemed "principally ... for the rich and exclusive." Dixwell recalled that during his school years, the BLS leadership felt threatened by a rival private school founded by "an Englishman named Fisher", which had "received the patronage of several rich men." Competition from Fisher forced BLS to improve its academic reputation, which allowed BLS to then drive Fisher out of business and claim his students. In turn, Eliot wrote that the Dixwell School was the first private school to rival BLS academically, and that because of Dixwell's success, many other private day schools were established, which drew away "many sons of well-to-do families" from BLS. Robert Grant, whose father bucked upper-class convention by sending his sons to BLS, concluded that Charles Eliot "had no brief for sending a son to a public school for the sake of democracy if the free education provided was inferior to what could be had at a private [school]."

Coming from a socially elite background, Dixwell was well-placed to capitalize on these changes. His family was wealthy. He had read law under Charles Jackson, the father-in-law of Oliver Wendell Holmes Sr. He married into another leading Boston family when he wed Mary Ingersoll Bowditch, the daughter of Nathaniel Bowditch. His Harvard roommate was Cornelius Felton, the future president of Harvard University. Two of his daughters married his well-born students: Fanny Dixwell married Oliver Wendell Holmes Jr., and Mary Dixwell married George Wigglesworth, the future president of the Harvard Board of Overseers and treasurer of the Massachusetts Institute of Technology, whose family gave its name to Wigglesworth Hall at Harvard Yard.

Dixwell cultivated a similarly patrician student body. He set the tuition at $250/year. By contrast, Phillips Exeter charged day students $14 and boarders around $150. In fact, Dixwell's cost at least twice as much as Harvard itself ($75–104). It was the unofficial costs of attending college, such as socially expected luxury apartments, that made Harvard more expensive than Dixwell's in practice. Dixwell limited enrollment to 50 students, set up shop in what was then a "very select" neighborhood, and quickly moved into a purpose-built facility down the road at 20 Boylston Place. He educated many wealthy students from Beacon Hill and the Boston suburbs, and sought to teach his students "the morals and manners befitting sons of Boston's patrician class." One biographer wrote that at Dixwell's, "it was taken for granted that [his students] would attend Harvard College as generations of their fathers had before them."

The school coexisted with upper-class boarding schools, and educated boarding school alumni who needed additional training for college entrance exams. Frederick Shattuck's father George was the future dean of Harvard Medical School. Frederick became the first-ever student at St. Paul's School in New Hampshire; he finished his college preparation at Dixwell's and duly proceeded to Harvard College and Harvard Medical School. Shattuck recalled that "[Dixwell] did not approve of me, and I did not appreciate him." William Sumner Appleton Jr. had deep Harvard ties; his father, a Dixwell man, designed the Harvard seal. The younger Appleton similarly "attended" St. Paul's but was "fitted for college" at Hopkinson's. Dixwell alumnus William Hathaway Forbes was the first president of the re-founded Milton Academy in 1885, and several students attended both Milton and Hopkinson's, including Forbes' son Cameron, Citibank chairman James H. Perkins, and surgeon William E. Ladd.

Aided by these shifts, Dixwell's became one of Harvard's leading feeder schools. Dixwell's and its competitor Nobles trained 12% of all Harvard undergraduates from 1846 to 1870. In addition, by the middle of the nineteenth century, nearly 40% of Harvard freshmen were alumni of three schools: Dixwell's, BLS, and Exeter. Alumnus William Lawrence called Dixwell's "the best fitting school for Harvard."

=== Hopkinson School ===
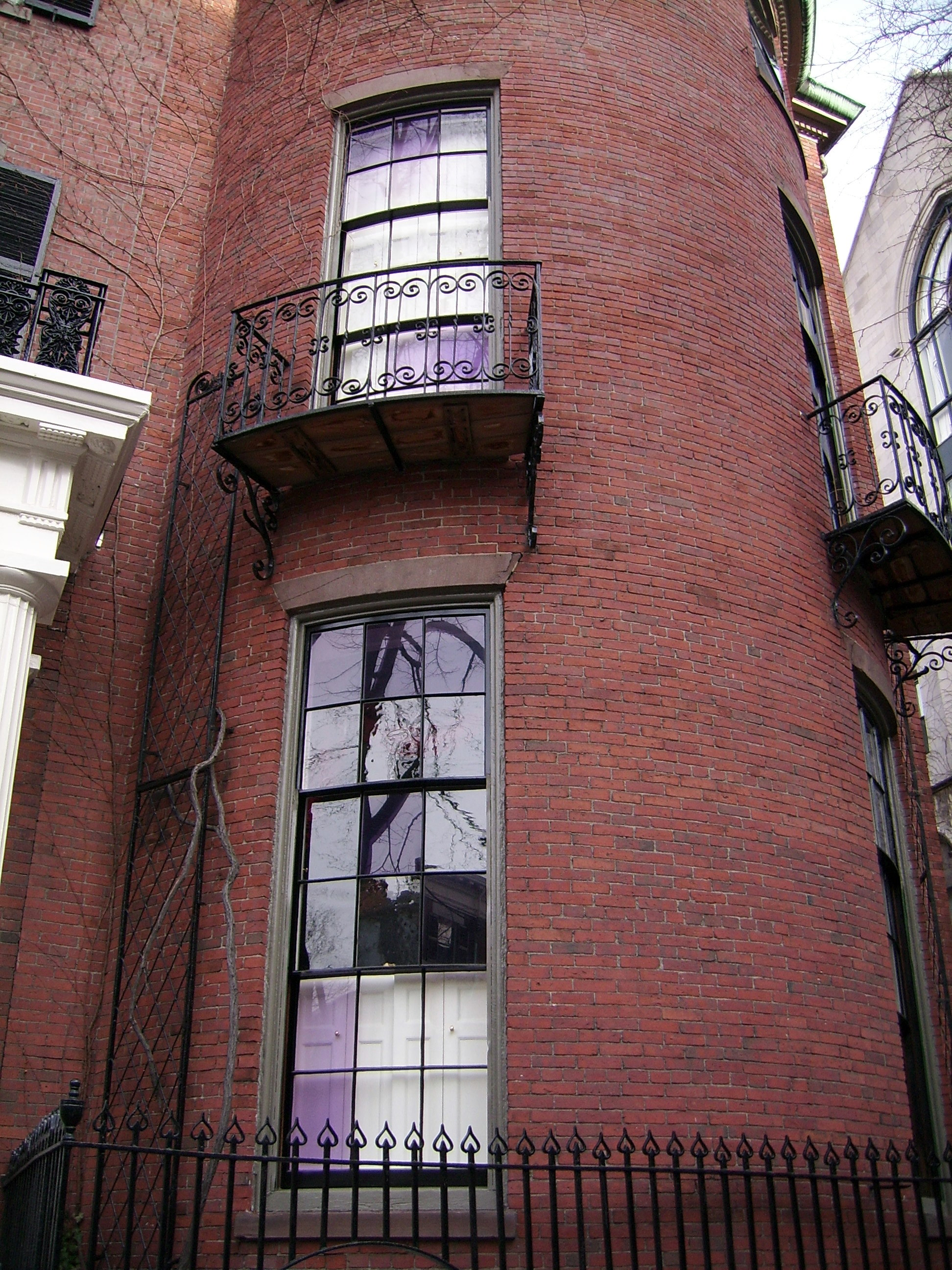
To Boston's elite, the purple window panes of Charles Bulfinch's Hopkinson School building on Chestnut Street symbolized old money.

Dixwell retired in 1872 and sold the Boylston Place campus to John Prentiss Hopkinson, who had taught at Dixwell's for six years before leaving in 1868. Hopkinson renamed the school after himself; it was familiarly nicknamed "Hoppy's." In 1889, Hopkinson moved the school to Edwin Booth's old home at 29 Chestnut Street, Beacon Hill, "where his school reached its zenith of popularity."

The Hopkinson School continued to enjoy close ties with Harvard University and the Eliot family in particular. Charles W. Eliot had recently taken over Harvard University (in 1869), and he encouraged private secondary schools to build strong relationships with Harvard. Eliot sent his own son Samuel to Hopkinson's, (Note: Samuel initially attended Cambridge High School, a public school, but Eliot made him transfer to Hopkinson's, explaining that Samuel "has not done well at the High School, and I think he will have a better chance of making substantial improvement if his surroundings are now changed." Eliot assured the Cambridge High principal that the school was not at fault for his son's bad habits.) and Samuel eventually married J. P. Hopkinson's daughter. From 1870 to 1895, Hopkinson's was Harvard's third-largest feeder school, with 331 students. In 1895, Hopkinson's was Harvard's largest feeder school, with 53 students, prompting the Boston Globe to write that Hopkinson's commanded "enormous social prestige" at Harvard and that "Hoppy men" were a "cinch" for the Harvard College social clubs. All together, Dixwell's and Hopkinson's sent over 800 students to Harvard between 1851 and 1905.

Hopkinson was associated with several other prep schools. One of his assistants, James Greenough, married into the family of G.W.C. Noble and joined that man's competitor school in 1892; as a result, Noble's Classical School was renamed to Noble and Greenough. Another assistant, Arthur Volkmann, started his own Harvard feeder school in 1895. Hopkinson's students also started boarding schools. William Amory Gardner co-founded Groton School in 1884, and William Cameron Forbes co-founded Middlesex School in 1901.

=== Legate's Private Classical School ===
As late as 1895, Hopkinson was the only individual listed on the school's marketing materials. That same year, Arthur Volkmann left and opened a new school on Marlborough Street in Back Bay. In 1896, Hopkinson promoted Burton John Legate to co-principal; Legate had been teaching at Hopkinson's since 1880. Legate officially took over the school in 1905, and renamed the school to Mr. Legate's Private Classical School. However, Hopkinson kept the campus and sold it to Mary Morton Kehew in 1907. Legate moved to nearby 66 Beacon Street.

The Legate School appears to have vanished into obscurity. Dixwell alumnus Winthrop Scudder claimed that J.P. Hopkinson retired in 1897 and that the school closed that year. However, the Hopkinson School continued to list both Legate and J.P. Hopkinson on school advertisements until the 1905–06 school year. Moreover, after renaming the school, Legate claimed that his school was the "[s]uccessor to the Hopkinson School", as well as Dixwell's. He claimed the Dixwell's foundation date of 1851. By 1931 the Legate School had been removed from Sargent's private school handbook, but it still appeared in other educational directories as late as 1934. Burton Legate died in 1937, at the age of 82.

Hopkinson's student body may have decamped for Nobles and Volkmann's, which eventually merged. (Note: Possibly relying on Winthrop Scudder, The Boston Globe wrote that Hopkinson dissolved his school in 1897 and split his students among Volkmann's and Nobles. However, this is not strictly true, as Hopkinson School existed beyond 1897. That said, at least one family switched allegiance from Hopkinson's to Volkmann's. James Jackson Minot was a Dixwell's alumnus. However, his son, the Nobel Prize-winning medical researcher George Minot, attended Volkmann's. In fact, the younger Minot attended a middle school in Back Bay that by the turn of the century fed students primarily to Nobles and Volkmann's (and not Hopkinson's).) Volkmann's eventually "ranked among the most socially prestigious [prep schools] in Boston," and became "Nobles' closest athletic and academic rival." The Sargent private school handbook wrote that Volkmann's "succeeded in large part to the popularity of 'Hoppy's' and for some years held the primacy among Boston schools." Following the merger, Nobles held a ceremony to honor Dixwell's alumnus Gerrit Smith Miller, during which a plaque honoring Miller was unveiled on campus. At the ceremony, Nobles headmaster Charles Wiggins claimed that the Dixwell alumni agreed Nobles was now "the natural inheritor of [the Dixwell] traditions." However, the plaque "disappeared soon after the unveiling" and was never replaced.

== Athletics ==
=== American football: The Oneidas ===
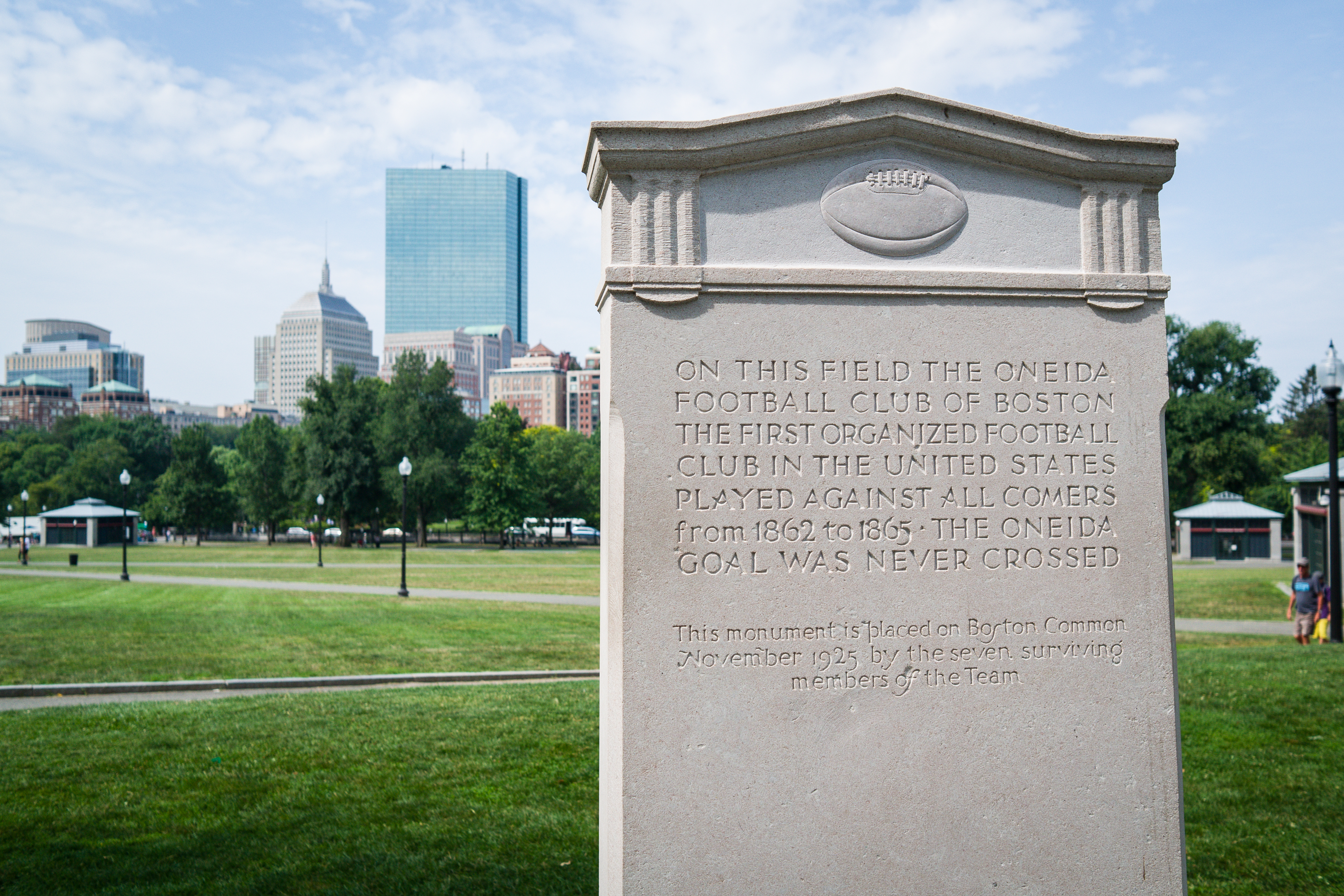
A monument on Boston Common marks the site of the Oneida Football Club's playing fields.

Dixwell's was a pioneer in early American football. In 1862, seven years before the 1869 Princeton vs. Rutgers football game (the first college football game), Dixwell's student Gerrit Smith Miller established the Oneida Football Club, named after Oneida Lake in New York State, near Miller's home. (Although Dixwell's was a day school, Miller acquired lodgings in Boston to study under Dixwell.) The Oneida Football Club fielded 12 Dixwell's students, including Miller, Robert Means Lawrence, and Francis Greenwood Peabody, as well as two students from Boston English and one student from Boston Latin. Football historians Walter Camp and Parke H. Davis could not think of any earlier football club "organized on a permanent basis."

To some extent, the novelty of the Oneida Football Club was determined in retrospect: "[t]hat a group of boys was playing a form of football was nothing new or remarkable for Boston at the time." The Dixwell School already had its own football team, an after-school activity organized in 1855 "simply as a matter of fun and exercise." Nor did Miller learn football at Dixwell's: Amos Alonzo Stagg wrote that he picked up the game while living in New Jersey. Moreover, the Oneida game did not resemble modern football, as the rules of football were still evolving.

However, the Oneidas emerged at a time when Boston high school football was particularly popular. Parke Davis concluded that while there had been many pickup football games before 1862, Oneida was the first club "playing a definite schedule of games." In addition, Harvard banned football from 1860 to 1872. As a result, "city football ... was confined to schoolboys," and Dixwell students "benefit[ed] from a vacuum left by collegiate prohibition." Local newspapers covered Dixwell football games.

Despite having Boston Latin and Boston English students on their roster, the Oneidas played games against the Latin and English school teams, as well as a combined Latin-English team. Oneida's J. Malcolm Forbes, an English student, temporarily left the team to captain the combined Latin-English squad. The team dissolved after four years.

=== Tennis ===
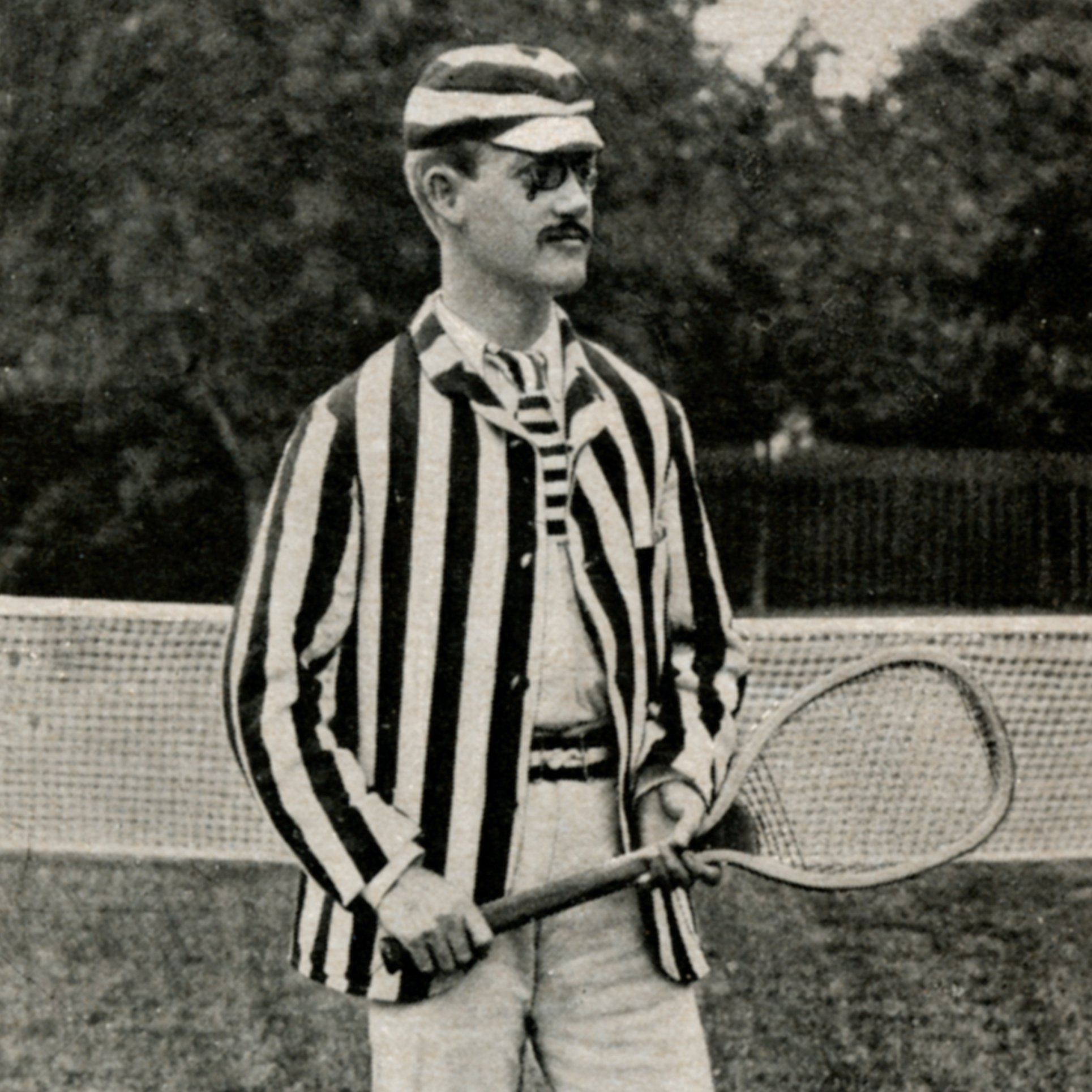
Richard Dudley Sears (Hopkinson's) won the first seven U.S. National Tennis Championships in men's singles.

The school's alumni made significant contributions to American tennis. After Dixwell's, James Dwight graduated from Harvard in 1874. In 1876, he organized America's first lawn tennis tournament at the Nahant, Massachusetts estate of his uncle William Sumner Appleton Sr., who also attended Dixwell's. He served as president of the United States Lawn Tennis Association for twenty years, and has been called the "Father of American Tennis."

Dwight taught the game to his cousin Richard Dudley Sears, a Hopkinson's graduate. Sears won the first seven U.S. Championships in men's singles, and teamed up with Dwight to win five U.S. Championships in men's doubles; Sears also won a sixth doubles title with Joseph Clark. Other Hopkinson's men also excelled at tennis: Malcolm Whitman won three more U.S. titles in men's singles, and Irving Wright won two U.S. titles in mixed doubles.

=== Interschool athletics ===
Hopkinson's made various attempts to organize athletics on a school-by-school basis. During the 1885-86 school year, Hopkinson's, Roxbury Latin, and St. Mark's started the Interscholastic Athletic Association, an early high school athletic conference. St. Mark's, a suburban boarding school, left in the 1888-89 school year, but the day schools responded by adding Boston Latin, Boston English, Cambridge High and Latin, Worcester Academy, Exeter, Andover, and several other schools. By 1900, Hopkinson's, BLS, Cambridge Latin, Newton High School, and Brookline High School announced a new league, but Hopkinson's left within five years.

The Hopkinson's football team went into decline. In 1903, the team was unable to complete the season and the team was temporarily disbanded. In 1904, Hopkinson's announced that it permanently dropped football and intended to drop hockey and baseball as well.

== Notable alumni ==
=== Dixwell's ===
- Henry Adams, journalist and historian
- Robert Amory, physician and professor of medicine
- Murray R. Ballou, president of the Boston Stock Exchange
- William Sturgis Bigelow, art collector
- Edward Darley Boit, painter; see The Daughters of Edward Darley Boit
- Charles Pickering Bowditch, archaeologist and linguist
- Henry Pickering Bowditch, dean of Harvard Medical School; namesake of the Bowditch effect
- Edward Burgess, yacht designer; three-time America's Cup winner
- James Read Chadwick, gynecologist; namesake of Chadwick's sign
- James Dwight, American tennis pioneer; five-time U.S. National Tennis Champion (US Open), men's doubles; president of the United States Lawn Tennis Association
- Thomas Dwight, president of the Association of American Anatomists
- Samuel Franklin Emmons, president of the Geological Society of America
- James Murray Forbes, founder of The Country Club (Brookline); partner, Russell & Company
- William Hathaway Forbes, president of Bell Telephone Company (AT&T)
- Douglas Frazar, U.S. Army brevet brigadier general; commander, 104th Regiment, United States Colored Troops
- Augustus Hemenway, philanthropist and politician
- Oliver Wendell Holmes Jr., U.S. Supreme Court justice
- Charles Loring Jackson, organic chemist, professor at Harvard University
- Robert Means Lawrence, physician and writer
- William Lawrence, Episcopal Bishop of Massachusetts
- John J. Loud, inventor of the ballpoint pen
- Henry Cabot Lodge Sr., United States Senator from Massachusetts
- William Loring, Justice of the Massachusetts Supreme Judicial Court; name partner of Ropes, Gray and Loring
- Edward Jackson Lowell, attorney
- Nathan Matthews Jr., Mayor of Boston
- Charles McBurney, surgeon, namesake of McBurney's point
- Gerrit Smith "Gat" Miller, early American football pioneer
- John Torrey Morse, biographer
- William Wells Newell, folklorist
- Francis Greenwood Peabody, theology professor at Harvard University
- Charles Sanders Peirce, philosopher
- Charles Pickering Putnam, pediatrician; president of the American Pediatric Society
- Arthur Rotch, architect
- Henry S. Russell, commissioner of the Boston Fire Department
- Charles Sprague Sargent, botanist, director of the Harvard Arboretum
- Frederick Shattuck, first student at St. Paul's School; instructor at Harvard Medical School
- Bellamy Storer, U.S. Ambassador to Austria-Hungary, Belgium, and Spain
- Nathaniel Thayer III, railroad executive
- John Collins Warren Jr., president of the American Surgical Association
- William F. Wharton, United States Assistant Secretary of State
- Roger Wolcott, Governor of Massachusetts

=== Hopkinson's ===
- Arthur Adams, sailor, winner of the 1920 America's Cup
- Charles Francis Adams III, U.S. Secretary of the Navy; treasurer of Harvard University; president of the Massachusetts Historical Society; sailor, captain of the team that won the 1920 America's Cup
- William Sumner Appleton Jr., historical preservationist
- Robert Bacon, U.S. Secretary of State
- Robert Woods Bliss, U.S. Ambassador to Argentina and Sweden; donor of Dumbarton Oaks
- Skeets Canterbury, hockey coach
- David Cheever, president of the American Surgical Association
- Ellery Harding Clark, 1896 Olympic gold medalist in the high jump and long jump; Boston city alderman
- Charles Allerton Coolidge, architect, notably the Art Institute of Chicago, Stanford University, and Rockefeller University
- Roland Burrage Dixon, professor of anthropology at Harvard University
- Samuel A. Eliot, president of the American Unitarian Association; son of Charles W. Eliot
- Augustus P. Gardner, U.S. Congressman
- Nathaniel W. Faxon, director of Massachusetts General Hospital
- Ralph Emerson Forbes, president of the Milton Preparatory School Corporation and secretary of Milton Academy
- William Cameron Forbes, United States governor-general of the Philippines
- Morris Gray, president of the Boston Museum of Fine Arts
- Roland Gray, attorney, senior partner of Ropes & Gray; son of John Chipman Gray
- John Hallowell, two-time All-American football player at Harvard
- John Homans, surgeon, namesake of the Homans sign
- Robert Homans, attorney, name partner of Hill & Homans (later Hill and Barlow)
- Charles Hopkinson, artist
- William Edwards Ladd, chief of surgery at Boston Children's Hospital
- George Cabot Lee Jr., banker, partner of Lee, Higginson & Co.; brother-in-law of Theodore Roosevelt
- James Arnold Lowell, District Judge for the U.S. District Court for the District of Massachusetts
- James H. Perkins, chairman of the National City Bank of New York
- Thomas Nelson Perkins, attorney, former name partner of Ropes & Gray; World War I peace negotiator at the Paris Conference
- Philip Shelton Sears, sculptor, three-time NCAA Men's tennis champion (2x singles, 1x doubles)
- Richard Dudley Sears, seven-time U.S. National Tennis Champion (US Open), men's singles
- John H. Sherburne, U.S. Army brigadier general
- Endicott Peabody Saltonstall, Middlesex County District Attorney
- Robert Gould Shaw II, polo player
- Francis R. Stoddard Jr., attorney
- Ezra Ripley Thayer, dean of Harvard Law School
- John Eliot Thayer, ornithologist
- Benjamin Wells, commissioner of the Boston Fire Department
- Malcolm Whitman, three-time U.S. National Tennis Champion, men's singles
- Irving Wright, tennis player, two-time U.S. National Tennis Champion, mixed doubles

== Sources ==
- Aichele, Gary Jan (1989). Oliver Wendell Holmes, Jr. - soldier, scholar, judge. Boston, MA: Twayne Publishers. ISBN 978-0-8057-7784-0.
- Dixwell, Epes Sargent (1907). An Autobiographical Sketch, Unfinished and Unrevised (PDF). Boston, MA: G.H. Ellis Co. – via Library of Congress.
- Eliot, Charles William (1971) [1924]. A Late Harvest: Miscellaneous Papers Written Between Eighty And Ninety. Boston, MA: The Atlantic Monthly Press. ISBN 978-1-258-30250-4.
- Hinchman, Walter Swain (1916). "The Pupil and the School". The American School: A Study of Secondary Education. Doubleday, Page. pp. 31–48.
- Marston, Kevin Tallec; Cronin, Mike (2024). Inventing the Boston Game: Football, Soccer, and the Origins of a National Myth. University of Massachusetts Press. ISBN 978-1-62534-843-2.
- Scudder, Winthrop Saltonstall, ed. (1924). Gerrit Smith Miller: An Appreciation. Dedham, MA: Noble and Greenough School.
- Scudder, Winthrop Saltonstall (1926). An historical sketch of the Oneida Football Club of Boston, 1862-1865. On file with the Massachusetts Historical Society. Boston, MA: Self-published.
- Story, Ronald (1975). "Harvard Students, the Boston Elite, and the New England Preparatory System, 1800-1876". History of Education Quarterly. 15 (3): 281–298. doi:10.2307/367846. ISSN 0018-2680. JSTOR 367846.
- Story, Ronald (1980). The Forging of an Aristocracy: Harvard & the Boston Upper Class, 1800-1870. Middletown, CT: Wesleyan University Press. ISBN 978-0-8195-5044-6.
