= Homan (surname) =

Homan is a surname with a variety of origins. As a Dutch surname it appears to have originated as an assimilation (fm->m) of Ho(o)fman, making it cognate to names like Hoffman and Van 't Hof, indicating either an occupational (court servant; steward; or farmer) or toponymic origin (man at the homestead, court or farm). The oldest attestation is in the 14th century in Drenthe. In North America, it may be an Americanized spelling of the German names Homann or Hohmann. Homan also exists since the 17th century in Ireland, while in England it may be a variant of Holman. Notable people with the surname include:

- Bálint Hóman (1885–1951), Hungarian historian, Minister of Religion and Education 1932–1942, and Nazi collaborator
- Bill Homan (1880–1963), Australian footballer
- Conrad Homan (1840–1922), Union Army soldier during the American Civil War
- Cornelius Homan (1900–1979), English Conservative Party politician
- Darren Homan (born 1974), Irish footballer
- Dennis Homan (born 1946), American football player
- Ed Homan, American physician and Republican politician in Florida
- Frank A. Homan, (1875–1958), American politician, mayor of Fresno, California
- Gertrude Homan (1882–1951), American actress, screenwriter, film editor, and studio executive
- Jared Homan (born 1983), American basketball player
- Johannes Linthorst Homan (1903–1986), Dutch politician and diplomat
- Korie Homan (born 1986), Dutch wheelchair tennis player
- Luke Homan, (-2006), American college basketball player
- Mark Homan (born 1979/80), Canadian curler, brother of Rachel
- Paul Homan (1893–1969), American economist
- Rachel Homan (born 1989), Canadian curler, sister of Mark
- Ralph Homan (1928–2013), American (South Dakota) politician and businessman
- Ross Homan (born 1987), American football linebacker
- Thomas Homan (born 1961), American government official, acting director of US Immigration and Customs Enforcement (ICE)
- Two-Bits Homan (1898–1953), American football player
- William Homan (1771–1852), Irish baronet

Adopted as a given or middle name

- Homan Potterton (1946–2020), Irish art historian and writer
- Emma Homan Thayer (1842–1908), American botanical artist and author
- Howard Homan Buffett (1903–1964), American businessman, investor, and politician, father of Warren Buffett
- Joseph Homan Manley (1842–1905), American Republican Party official
- William Homan Thorpe (1902–1986), British zoologist, ethologist and ornithologist

== Named after people ==
- Homan Bay on the eastern coast of Victoria Island, Canada, named by Amundsen after a sponsor of his expedition, C.H. Homan.
- Homan station (CTA Green Line) and Homan Square, both on Homan Ave, Chicago, itself named after the building contractor Joseph Homan
- Homansbyen, a neighborhood of Oslo named for the lawyer brothers Jacob (1816–1868) and Henrik Homan (1824–1900)

== See also ==
- Homann, German surname
- Homans, surname
