= Pierre-Paul =

Pierre-Paul may refer to:

== Places ==
- Lac Pierre-Paul (Mékinac), part of the Batiscanie watershed, in Quebec, Canada
- Pierre-Paul River, part of the Batiscanie watershed, in Quebec, Canada

== People ==
- Pierre-Paul (name)

== Ships ==
- SS Pierre-Paul (1891), a French cargo ship in service 1895-1900

== See also ==
- Peter Paul (disambiguation)
