= Homans =

Homans is a surname. Notable people with the surname include:

- Benjamin Homans (d. 1823), American merchant captain
- Bill Homans (b. 1949), American blues musician known as "Watermelon Slim"
- George C. Homans (1910–1989), American Sociologist
- Helen Homans (1878–1949), American tennis champion
- James Edward Homans (1865–1949), American author, editor and publisher
- Jennifer Homans (b. 1960), American academic and author
- John Homans (1877–1954), American surgeon who described Homans' sign and Homans' operation.
- Liesbeth Homans (b. 1973), Belgian politician
- Robert Homans (1877–1947), American actor
- Sheppard Homans, Jr. (1871–1952), All-American football player and insurance executive

== See also ==
- Homan (surname)
