= Alberdingk =

- family
- Country: Netherlands
- Founded: 17th century
- Founder: Christoffel Johannszn. Alberding

Alberdingk (also: Alberdingk Thijm) is the name of a Dutch patrician family.

== History ==
The oldest known family members is one Christoffel Johannszn. Alberding who lived in Langendahl in Hessen during the first half of the 17th century. His great-grandson Jonas Alberding converted to Roman Catholicism. His son, Johannes Heinrich Alberding (1719–1781) was a cooper and moved to Amsterdam. His grandson Johannes Heinrich, Joannes Franciscus Alberdingk Thijm (1788–1858), married in 1819 Catharina Thijm (1793–1864); in 1834, through a royal decree he was given the permission to carry the name Alberdingk Thijm.

== Notable members ==
- Josephus Albertus Alberdingk Thijm (1820–1889), writer and literature expert
- Karel Joan Lodewijk Alberdingk Thijm (1864–1952), writer who became known under the name Lodewijk van Deyssel.
- Petrus Paulus Maria Alberdingk Thijm (1827–1904), professor of literature and history at the university of Leuven.

== Bibliography ==
- Nederland's Patriciaat 50 (1964), p. 15-32.
