= Hohmann =

Hohmann may refer to:

- Hohmann (surname) (article includes list of persons named Hohmann)
- Hohmann transfer orbit, in orbital mechanics
- Hohmann (crater), a lunar crater
- 9661 Hohmann (1996 FU13), an asteroid

== See also ==
- Hohman
- Homann
- Homan (disambiguation)
