= Bancroft's sign =

- Differential diagnosis: deep vein thrombosis

Bancroft's sign, also known as Moses' sign, is a clinical sign found in patients with deep vein thrombosis of the lower leg involving the posterior tibial veins. The sign is positive if pain is elicited when the calf muscle is compressed forwards against the tibia, but not when the calf muscle is compressed from side to side. Like other clinical signs for deep vein thrombosis, such as Homans sign and Lowenberg's sign, this sign is neither sensitive nor specific for the presence of thrombosis.
