= Homan =

Homan may refer to:

== Places ==
- Homan, Iran, a village in Yazd Province, Iran
- Homan Bay, Nunavut, Canada
- Homan (CTA Green Line station)
- Homan Square Police Warehouse in Chicago

== Other uses ==
- Homan (surname)
- Homan (1884), Belarusian newspaper
- Homan (1916), Belarusian newspaper

== See also ==
- Homann
- Hohmann (disambiguation)
