= Lowenberg's sign =

- Differential diagnosis: deep vein thrombosis

Lowenberg's sign is a clinical sign found in patients with deep vein thrombosis of the lower leg. The sign is positive when pain is elicited rapidly when a blood pressure cuff is placed around the calf and inflated to 80mmHg. Like other signs of deep vein thrombosis, such as Homans sign and Bancroft's sign, this sign is neither sensitive nor specific for the presence of thrombosis.

The sign is named after Robert I. Lowenberg (1917–2000), who described it in 1954.
