= Hohmann (surname) =

Hohmann is a surname. Notable people with the surname include:

- Angela Hohmann (born 1963), German politician
- Arthur C. Hohmann (1895–1985), served as Los Angeles Police Department Chief of Police
- Christian Heinrich Hohmann (1811–1861), German composer, music teacher
- Karl Hohmann (1908–1974), German footballer
- Martin Hohmann (born 1948), German lawyer and politician
- Peter Hohmann, Edler of Hohenthal (1663–1732), German merchant
- Ruth Hohmann (born 1931), German jazz singer
- Thorsten Hohmann (born 1979), German professional pool player
- Ulf Hohmann (born 1963), German ethologist
- Walter Hohmann (1880–1945), German engineer

== See also ==
- Christine Hohmann-Dennhardt (born 1950), German politician and senior judge
- Hohman
- Homann
- Homan (disambiguation)
