= DW B =

Dutch literary magazine (1900–present)

DW B is the oldest literary magazine in Flanders that is still in print. It was first published as Dietsche Warande en Belfort, co-founded by Marie-Elisabeth Belpaire, as a merger between two earlier literary magazines, Dietsche Warande and Het Belfort. Dietsche Warande had been established in the Netherlands in 1855 by Joseph Albert Alberdingk Thijm, whose brother Paul had moved it to Flanders in 1887. Het Belfort was founded in 1886 by Jan Bols.

The goal for the foundation of these magazines was to provide a forum for (Dutch-language) Flemish authors, who until then rarely published in Dutch magazines; especially Catholic and West-Flemish authors did not feel at home in the Dutch literary milieu of the nineteenth century.

DW B is based in Brussels. Christophe Van Gerrewey is one of the members of the editorial board.
