= Kenneth R. Leibler =

American Business Executive

- Born: 1949 (age 76–77)
- Education: Syracuse University
- Spouse: Marcia Leibler
- Children: 2

Kenneth R. Leibler (born 1949) is an American business executive who was a founding partner of the Boston Options Exchange. He was previously chairman and chief executive officer of the Boston Stock Exchange, President and chief executive officer of Liberty Financial Companies and President of the American Stock Exchange. At 36 years old, he was the youngest president in American Stock Exchange history and believed to be the youngest president of any major stock exchange.

Prior to joining the American Stock Exchange in 1975, he founded the retail options division at Lehman Brothers and was a director of their retail options business. He was on the Board of Trustees of Putnam Mutual Funds from 2006-2024, as Vice Chair from 2016-2018 and Chair from 2018-2024. During his time as Chair, he led the board's oversight of the acquisition of Putnam Funds by Franklin Templeton. This transaction marked the largest fund-industry acquisition of 2023. He also was on the board of Eversource Energy as Vice Chairman of the Beth Israel Deaconess Hospital in Boston and as Director of ISO New England, Ruder Finn, and the Investment Company Institute in Washington, DC.

== Education ==
Leibler graduated Phi Beta Kappa in economics in 1971 from Syracuse University. He wrote his senior thesis on options trading.

== Career ==
=== Lehman Brothers ===
The Chicago Board Options Exchange (CBOE) began trading options in 1973. That same year, Leibler joined Lehman Brothers where he managed the firm's retail options business.

=== American Stock Exchange ===
After two years at Lehman Brothers, Leibler joined the American Stock Exchange (AMEX) in 1975 as one of the first employees in their options division. Through subsequent promotions, he became Chief Financial Officer, Executive Vice President for Administration and Finance, and in 1986, President.

Leibler was President of AMEX during the stock market crash of 1987 known as Black Monday. Following this crash, changes to market functioning were implemented under Leibler's leadership, including circuit breakers.

In 1989, Leibler wrote an article in The New York Times about a proposed financial instrument called an Equity Index Participation that the AMEX planned to introduce. This was a tradeable instrument that would allow investors to buy and sell an interest in the entire S&P 500 much like an ETF. It was approved by the SEC, but the ruling was later overturned by the United States Court of Appeals for the Seventh Circuit in Illinois.

=== Liberty Financial Companies ===
Liberty Financial Companies was a diversified asset management organization. Leibler joined as president and COO in 1990, and became CEO and led a public offering of the company in 1995. During his tenure, the company acquired Colonial Group, Newport Pacific Management, Progress Investment Management Co., and Crabbe Huson Group. He stepped down as CEO in 2000.

=== Boston Options Exchange ===
Leibler was chairman and CEO of the Boston Stock Exchange from 2001 to 2004. In 2004, he helped found the Boston Options Exchange (BOX) and then was its chairman until 2007. While at the Boston Options Exchange, Leibler and his colleagues Thomas Peterffy and Luc Bertrand patented a price improvement processor for the electronic trading of options. This new pricing mechanism introduced by BOX in 2004 resulted in option orders sent to a three-second auction where bidding took place in one-cent increments. This contrasted with the traditional pricing mechanism of "national best bid and offer" where bids were submitted in five- or ten-cent increments among all the exchanges and trades executed at the best price available.

== Patents ==
Price improvement processor for electronic trading of financial instruments, (2011).

== Awards ==
Leibler received the Ellis Island Medal of Honor in 1999. He was awarded the With Intelligence Trustee of the Year Award in 2024.
