= William Sumner Appleton =

Founder of the Society for the Preservation of New England Antiquities

William Sumner Appleton Jr.
- Born: May 29, 1874; Boston, Massachusetts
- Died: November 24, 1947 (aged 73); Lawrence, Massachusetts
- Burial place: Mount Auburn Cemetery
- Education: Harvard College
- Known for: Founder of SPNEA

William Sumner Appleton Jr. (May 29, 1874 – November 24, 1947) was founder of the Society for the Preservation of New England Antiquities (SPNEA) in 1910. He was the chief force behind much of the preservation of historic homes in the New England area.

== Early life ==
Appleton was born on May 29, 1874, in Boston to William Sumner Appleton (1840–1903) and Edith Stuart (d. 1892). As a boy he lived at 39 Beacon Street (also known as the Nathan Appleton Residence). He was from an old and wealthy family.

He was educated at Hopkinson's School for Boys, Boston, and graduated from Harvard College in 1896.

He was elected a member of the Ancient and Honorable Artillery Company in 1921 and served until his death.

== Career ==
Appleton worked tirelessly to promote preservation of buildings from the 17th, 18th, and early 19th centuries. He focused on buildings that were aesthetically pleasing, had historic significance, and could be independently supported. He was a member of the London Survey Committee, a voluntary organization publishing architectural surveys of the capital.

His method of preservation focused on cautious, deliberate restoration only when experts were involved and restorations were reversible. When he died in 1947, the SPNEA had grown tremendously and remains a strong and active organization today. Renamed Historic New England, the organization owns thirty-six historic properties.

== Personal life ==
Around 1916, Appleton lived on Spruce Street in Boston.

Appleton died on November 24, 1947, in Lawrence, Massachusetts. He is buried in a plot with his sister, Marjorie, who preceded him in death by 34 years, aged about 38.
