= Denmark Bay =

Bay in Nunavut, Canada

- Location within Nunavut
- Location: M'Clintock Channel
- Coordinates: 70°40′N 103°22′W
- Basin countries: Canada
- Settlements: Uninhabited

Denmark Bay is an Arctic waterway in Kitikmeot Region, Nunavut, Canada. It is located in western M'Clintock Channel, off the eastern coast of Victoria Island. It is separated from Homan Bay by a peninsula with a narrow isthmus.

== Geography ==
There are several islands within the bay, including Falsen Island at its headwaters.

Moraine ridges are found along eastern Victoria Island from Denmark Bay to Greely Haven.

== History ==
The Ekalluktogmiut, a subgroup of Copper Inuit, were traditionally located from Denmark Bay through Dease Strait. However, Copper Inuit traditional hunting area was south of the Denmark Bay/Walker Bay region.
