= Solarization (physics) =

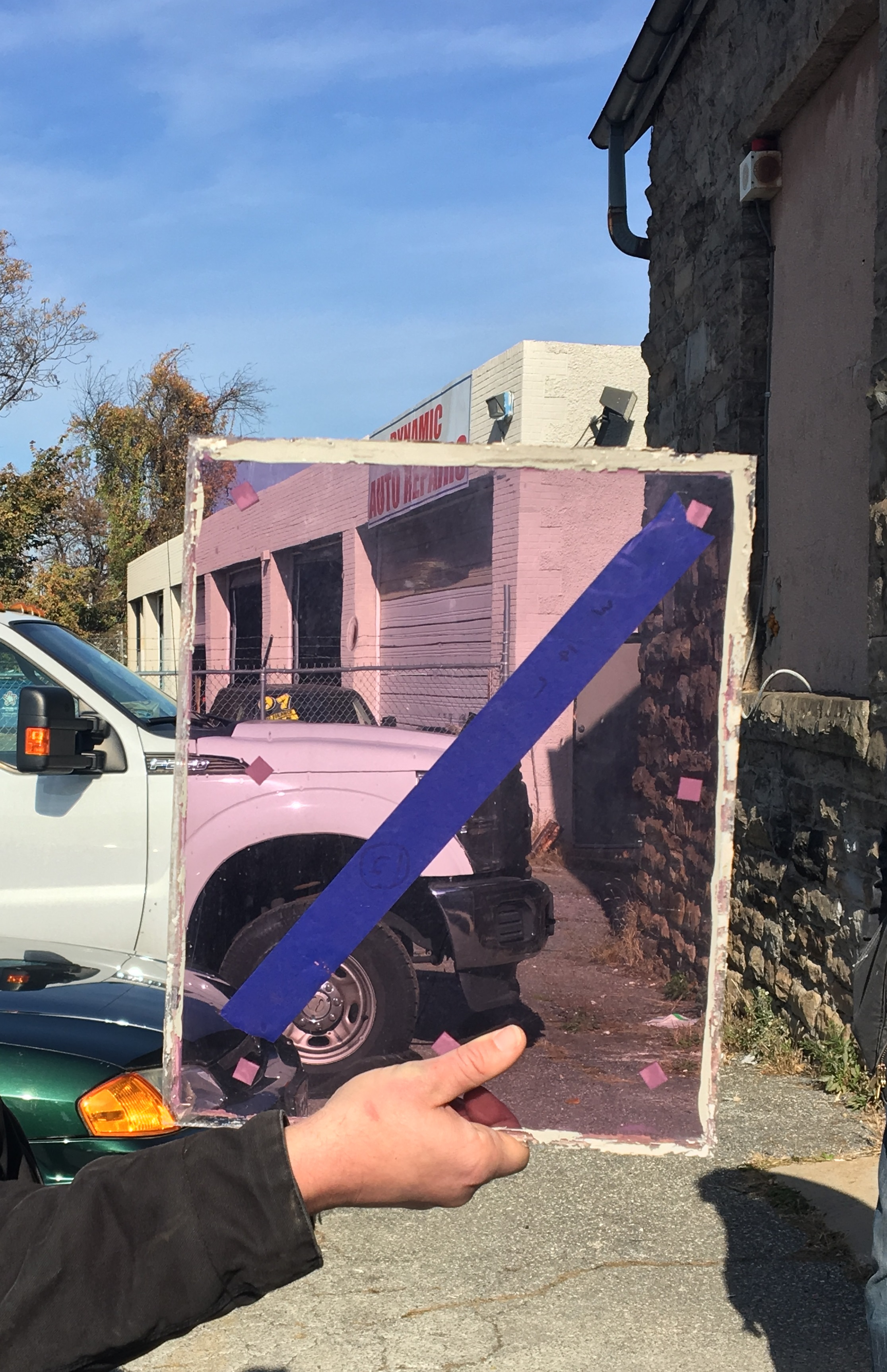
Single pane of historic solarized architectural glass, removed from its frame

Solarization is a phenomenon in physics where a material temporary changes color after being subjected to high-energy electromagnetic radiation, such as ultraviolet light or X-rays. For example, clear glass and many plastics may turn amber, green, or other colors when exposed to X-radiation, while glass can become blue after prolonged solar exposure in the desert. It is believed that solarization is caused by the formation of internal defects, called color centers, which selectively absorb portions of the visible light spectrum. In glass, color center absorption can often be reversed by heating the glass to high temperatures (a process called thermal bleaching) to restore the glass to its initial transparent state. However, solarization may also permanently degrade a material's physical or mechanical properties, and is one of the mechanisms involved in the breakdown of plastics within the environment.

== Examples ==
In the field of clinical imaging, with sufficient exposure, solarization of certain screen-film systems can occur, which obscures details within the X-ray image and degrades the accuracy of the diagnosis. Even though degradation can occur, this was found to be a rare phenomenon.

== See also ==
- Photodegradation
- Solarized architectural glass
