= Marie-Elisabeth Belpaire =

Belgian writer and activist (1853–1948)

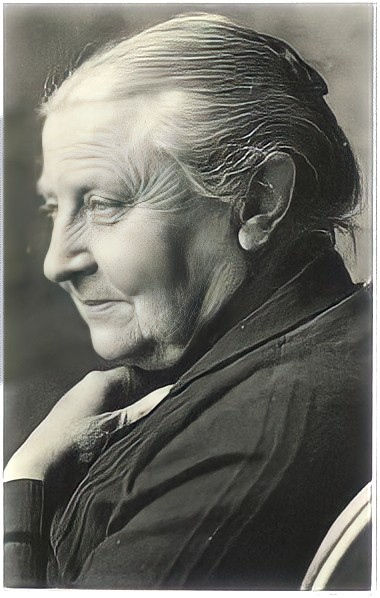
Marie-Elisabeth Belpaire

Marie-Elisabeth Belpaire (31 January 1853 – 9 June 1948) was a Belgian writer and activist. She was known as the "mother of the Flemish Movement".

== Life ==
The daughter of Alphonse Belpaire and Betsy Teichmann, she was born in Antwerp and grew up in the home of her maternal grandfather Jan Teichmann, who served as governor of Antwerp province. Taught by private teachers, she learned several languages and read Romantic literature written in French, German and English but soon became interested in Flemish literature.

She supported higher education for women, founding the Katholieke Vlaamse Hogeschool, a Catholic school for young professional women, and the Extension universitaire pour les femmes, university education for women. She also supported young musicians and writers in their work. She lobbied in support of equality for Dutch-speaking Belgians and official bilingualism (French and Dutch).

During World War I, she co-founded De Belgische Standaard, a Flemish newspaper at the Yser Front. She also defended the rights of Flemish soldiers, who served under French-speaking officers who did not speak their language.

With Catholic priest August Cuppens, she founded the Eigen Leven society to promote the Flemish Movement from a Catholic perspective. One important initiative was the merger of two existing Flemish literary publications, Dietsche Warande and Het Belfort, into the Dietsche Warande en Belfort journal, which was founded in 1900 and is still active. In the beginning, the new journal was mainly financed by Belpaire herself and she was also a contributor.

Belpaire published a number of essays, including studies on Ludwig van Beethoven and Dickens. She supported a Christian ideal of art, where art brings together truth and beauty, and so did not agree with more modern movements in literature. She published a three volume history of her relatives De families Teichmann en Belpaire (1925–34) and her own memoir Gestalten in 't verleden [Figures in the past] (1947).

She translated a number of literary works by Scandinavian authors into Dutch, including four by Johannes Jørgensen, one by Bjørnstjerne Bjørnson and some fairy tales by Hans Christian Andersen.

She died in Antwerp at the age of 95.

== Bibliography ==
- Uit het leven (From Life), poems (with Dr. Schaepman), 1887
- Herfstrozen (Autumn Roses), 1887
- Uit het leven (From Life), 1887 Wonderland (1894–1899) In wonderland (1894–1908)
- Liefderozen. Uit de legende der zoete Heilige Elizabeth (Love Roses. From the Legend of the Sweet Saint Elizabeth), in: Dietsche Warande. 1892
- Wonderland, fairytales (with Hilda Ram, Felix Timmermans, Louise Duykers), 5 parts, 1894–1899
- Levensleugen en levenswaarheid (Life's Lies and Life's Truths), 1900
- De uiterste dag (The Final Day), 1902
- Het landleven in de letterkunde der XIXde eeuw (Country Life in Literature from the Nineteenth Century), 1902
- Vrouweninvloed (Women's Influence), 1903
- Christen Ideaal (Christian Ideal), 1904
- Kunst en levensbeelden (Art and Images of Life) (van Jörgensen), 1906
- Levenswaardigheid (Quality of Life)
- De vier wondere jaren (The Four Wonderful Years), 1920
- August Cuppens. Zes en twintig jaar Vlaamsche vriendschap (Twenty-Six Years of Flemish Friendship), 1924
- De families Teichmann en Belpaire, 3 parts, 1925–1934
- Charles Dickens, 1929
- Beethoven: een kunst- en levensbeeld (Beethoven: An Art and Life Image), 1933
- Gestalten in 't verleden (Figures in the Past), 1947

== In literature ==
- B. ROOSE, De wijze vrouw van Vlaanderen. Het leven van Maria-Elisabeth Belpaire [The wise woman of Flanders. The life of Maria-Elisabeth Belpaire], 1948.
- Jan PERYN, Maria Elisa Belpaire, in: Nationaal Biografisch Woordenboek, Deel II, Brussel, 1966.
- H. SCHROOTEN, De sociale en politieke actie van Mej. Belpaire tijdens de Eerste wereldoorlog [The social and political action of Ms. Belpaire during the First World War], 1977.
- Ria CHRISTENS, Maria Belpaire, in: Nieuwe Encyclopedie van de Vlaamse Beweging, Tielt, 1998.
- Aline DEREERE, Helga VAN BEECK, Marie Elisabeth Belpaire (1853-1948). Facetten van een levenswerk [Facets of a life's work], Stichting Maria-Elisabeth Belpaire, Antwerpen, 2002.
- Geraldine REYMENANTS, Marie Elisabeth Belpaire. Gender en macht in het literaire veld 1900-1940 [Gender and power in the literary field 1900-1940], KADOC-studies 35, Universitaire Pers, Leuven, 2013.
- Jan ROBERT, Goed gezelschap? Marie-Elisabeth Belpaire en J. B. Priestley [Good company? Marie-Elisabeth Belpaire and J. B. Priestley], in: Zuurvrij, Berichten uit het Letternhuis, December 2015.
- Helga VAN BEECK, Rita VANDERHEYDEN, Karl SCHEERLINCK, Marie-Elisabeth Belpaire - Een vrouw met impact [Marie-Elisabeth Belpaire - A woman with an impact], Academia Press, Antwerpen, 2019.
