= Murray R. Ballou =

American financier

- Born: July 21, 1840; Boston, Massachusetts, US
- Died: April 28, 1914 (aged 73); Boston, Massachusetts, US
- Education: Harvard College
- Occupation: Stock broker
- Spouse: Lucretia B. Howland (1863–1899; her death)
- Children: 4

Murray Roberts Ballou (July 21, 1840 – April 28, 1914) was an American financier who led the Boston Stock Exchange from 1870 to 1900.

== Early life ==
Ballou was born on July 21, 1840, in Boston. He was the son of publisher Maturin Murray Ballou and grandson of clergyman Hosea Ballou. Ballou attended the school of Epes Sargent Dixwell from the ages of 12 to 14 then was tutored by Luther Farnham and Sidney Willard successively. Ballou graduated from Harvard College in 1862. On December 1, 1863, he married Lucretia B. Howland of New Bedford, Massachusetts. They had four children (Maturin Howland Ballou, Elise Murray Ballou, Franklin Burgess Ballou, and Mabel Ballou). Their eldest son, Maturin Howland Ballou, died on May 15, 1898. Lucretia Ballou died on July 27, 1899.

== Career ==
In 1865, Ballou founded a stock brokerage with classmate Benjamin Crowninshield Mifflin. Ballou was elected vice president of the Boston Stock Exchange in 1869 and became its president the following year. The exchange underwent a number of changes under Ballou's leadership. In 1879 the membership cap was expanded to 150. In 1885 it adopted a continuous session. The BSE also began using a stock ticker during Ballou's tenure as president.

In 1888 the office of president was made an honorary position and Ballou was elected to the newly created position of chairman. He continued to preside over the exchange until his retirement in 1900.

== Death ==
Ballou died on April 28, 1914, at his home in Boston. He was survived by three of his children. He was buried in Mount Auburn Cemetery.
