= Boston Stock Exchange =

Stock exchange in Boston, Massachusetts, United States

Coordinates: 42°21′20.10″N 71°3′27.54″W

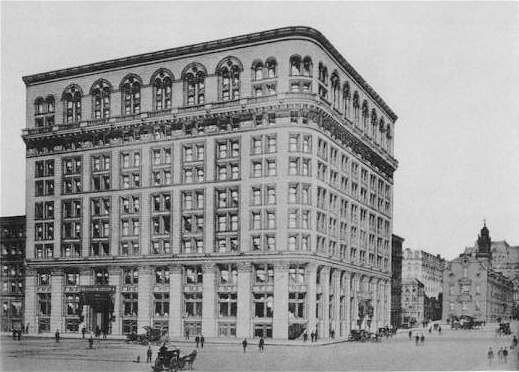
- The Boston Stock Exchange Building in 1893
- Type: Stock exchange
- Location: Boston, Massachusetts, United States
- Founded: 1834
- Owner: Nasdaq, Inc.
- Currency: United States dollar

The Boston Stock Exchange (formerly NASDAQ BX, earlier BSE) was an American regional stock exchange located in Boston, Massachusetts, United States. It was founded in 1834, making it the third-oldest stock exchange in the United States. On October 2, 2007, Nasdaq, Inc. agreed to acquire BSE for $61 million.

== History ==
=== Early years and founding ===
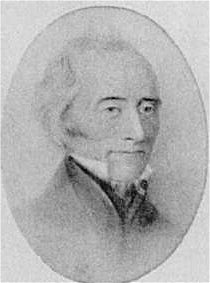
P.P.F. Degrand

The Boston Stock Exchange was founded on October 13, 1834, originally operating as the Boston Broker's Board. The exchange was established when thirteen Boston-area brokers agreed to meet daily to compare securities offerings and facilitate trading activity.

Financial historian P.P.F. Degrand was later described by Clarence W. Barron and Joseph G. Martin as "the man to whose indomitable energy and foresight the existence of the Boston Stock Exchange is largely due".

The founding members included Henry Andrews, Matthew Bolles, Benjamin Brown Jr., J. W. Clark, Samuel Gilbert Jr., Enoch Martin, Edmund Munroe, Thomas R. Sewell, John E. Thayer, George M. Thatcher, and Samuel G. Williams.

The exchange's first officers were Samuel Dana, who served as president, George W. Pratt as vice president, and Thomas R. Sewell as secretary and treasurer.

=== 19th century ===
When it first opened the only available securities on the exchange were stocks in banks, insurance companies, local mills, canal projects, small mining operations, and various public debts. As the exchange grew it dealt in iron, coal, and copper stocks. The exchange was used by the Lake Superior copper mines during the United States' first copper boom. The textile mills of Lowell, Lawrence, Manchester, and Lewiston that were a part of the exchange in its early years were almost totally absent by 1893, as the business was mostly held by auctioneers.

The Boston Stock Exchange played an important role in the development of railroads in New England by providing a market for their securities. Railroads that used the exchange included the Boston and Providence Railroad, Boston and Lowell Railroad, and Boston and Worcester Railroad. The BSE also provided early capital for the American American Bell Telephone Company, United Shoe Machinery Corporation, United Fruit Company, Union Pacific Railroad, and Calumet and Hecla Mining Company.

By 1844 the number of members had grown from 13 to 36. In 1855 it had grown to 75 members. An economic boom in 1879 resulted in a high demand for membership so the BSE voted to cap its membership at 150, where it stood for many years.

On November 9, 1885, the Boston Stock Exchange held its first continuous session. Prior to this there was a morning board and afternoon board. The morning board would start at 10:30 AM and the afternoon board would begin at 2 PM. Both would adjourn whenever brokers had completed their orders, which could take anywhere between one and three hours.

=== 20th century ===
The Boston Stock Exchange closed from June 30 to December 10, 1914, due to chaos created by the start of World War I. It was the first time the exchange had ever suspended operations.

During World War II, women were permitted to work on the BSE floor due to the lack of young men available to work as pages.

In 1965, the BSE switched from having an unsalaried president elected from the exchange's membership to having a full-time salaried president as part of a modernization plan.

The BSE grew in the mid-1960s when institutions began utilizing regional exchanges for "give-ups" or the sharing of commissions between brokers. In 1967, a record 67 million shares were traded and the cost of a seat on the exchange had grown to $14,000 (up from $2,000 three years earlier). On December 5, 1968, the U.S. Securities and Exchange Commission outlawed "give-ups", which cut the number of trades on the BSE down to 24.6 million shares in 1970.

In 1981, the BSE hired Charles J. Mohr, a 34-year-old vice president of the New York Stock Exchange, to serve as its first full-time paid chairman and CEO.

Stock exchanges (listing venues) owned by Nasdaq, Inc.

Increased computer trading in the early 1990s resulted in the BSE losing business to NASDAQ and similar exchanges. At the same time, the BSE and other regionals were harmed by rise of large institutional investors, who preferred the New York Stock Exchange to regionals. By 1992, the BSE and Philadelphia Stock Exchange were tied as the nation's smallest regional.

In 1998, a proposed merger with the Cincinnati Stock Exchange fell through when the two sides could not come to an agreement.

=== 21st century ===
In its later years, the BSE served as an alternative to the New York Stock Exchange for the area's mutual fund companies. In 2001, the BSE reached its peak of 100 million shares a day.

In 2002, the BSE co-founded the Boston Options Exchange (BOX), an automated equity options exchange, with partners the Montreal Exchange (MX), a derivatives exchange, and Interactive Brokers, a discount brokerage. By 2005 the BOX controlled 6% of the market.

As a result of BOX's success, Fidelity Investments and several Wall Street brokerage houses invested $20 million to help develop an electronic stock trading platform for the BSE. The electronic system handled less than half a percent of the daily US stock transactions and it was shut down in September 2007.

In 2007, Nasdaq, Inc. acquired the Boston Stock Exchange for $61 million ($38 million cash and $23 million in debt). The deal gave Nasdaq BSE's clearing license, which allowed it to settle trades made on its exchange rather than pay a third party to clear its transactions. It also allowed NASDAQ to offer companies symbols with one to three letters, which would allow companies to move from the New York Stock Exchange to NASDAQ without changing their symbols. The sale did not include the Boston Options Exchange, which was sold later that year to the Montreal Exchange. The exchange was renamed to NASDAQ BX.

In 2026, NASDAQ BX reincorporated and moved to Dallas, becoming Nasdaq Texas.

== Locations ==
The Boston Stock Exchange's original headquarters was on the third floor of the Washington Bank Building at 47 State Street. In 1844, the BSE moved to the fourth floor of the Merchants Exchange. On March 28, 1853, the exchange moved to the Union Bank Building at 40 State Street. The exchange moved again ten years later, this time to the Howe Building at 13 Exchange Street. On November 9, 1885, the BSE moved back to the Merchants Exchange building, this time to the hall known as the Reading Room. The exchange temporarily moved back to the Howe Building in 1890 when the Merchants Exchange building was demolished. The exchange moved to the new Merchants Exchange building on April 20, 1891. In April 1911, the exchange moved to a two-story domed building at 53 Congress Street. In 1980 it moved to the 38th floor of One Boston Place. In 1999 the BSE moved to the old Boston Safe Deposit and Trust building at 100 Franklin Street. When the BSE was sold to NASDAQ the Boston office was closed and operations were consolidated in New York.

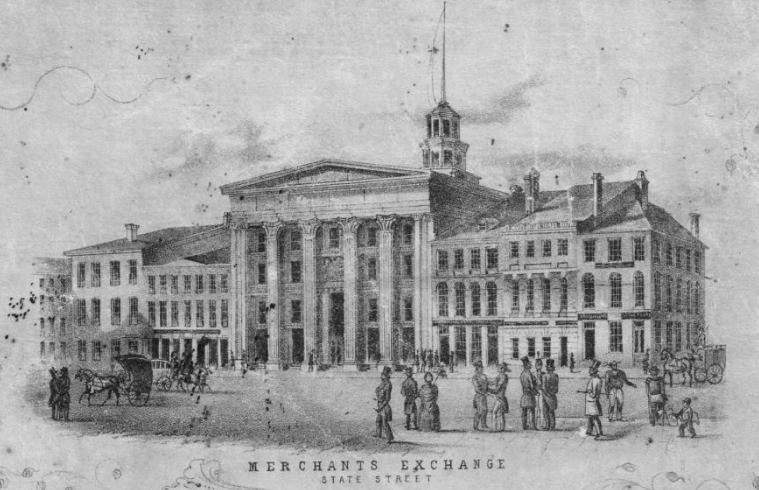
First Merchants Exchange Building, used by the Boston Stock Exchange from 1844 to 1853 and again from 1885 to 1890

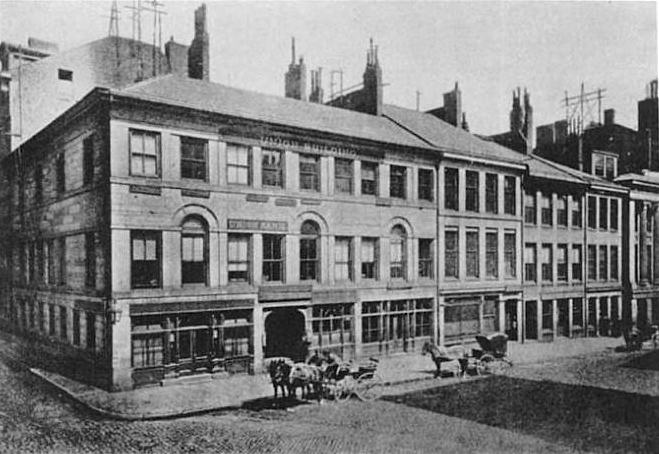
Union Bank Building, home to the Boston Stock Exchange from 1853 to 1863

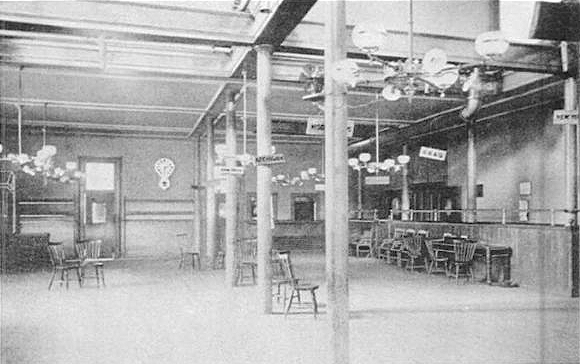
Boston Brokers' Board Room inside the Howe Building, used by the exchange from 1863 to 1885 and 1890 to 1891

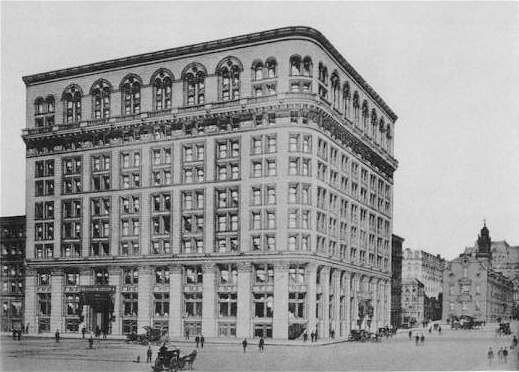
Second Merchants Exchange Building, used by the BSE from 1891 to 1911

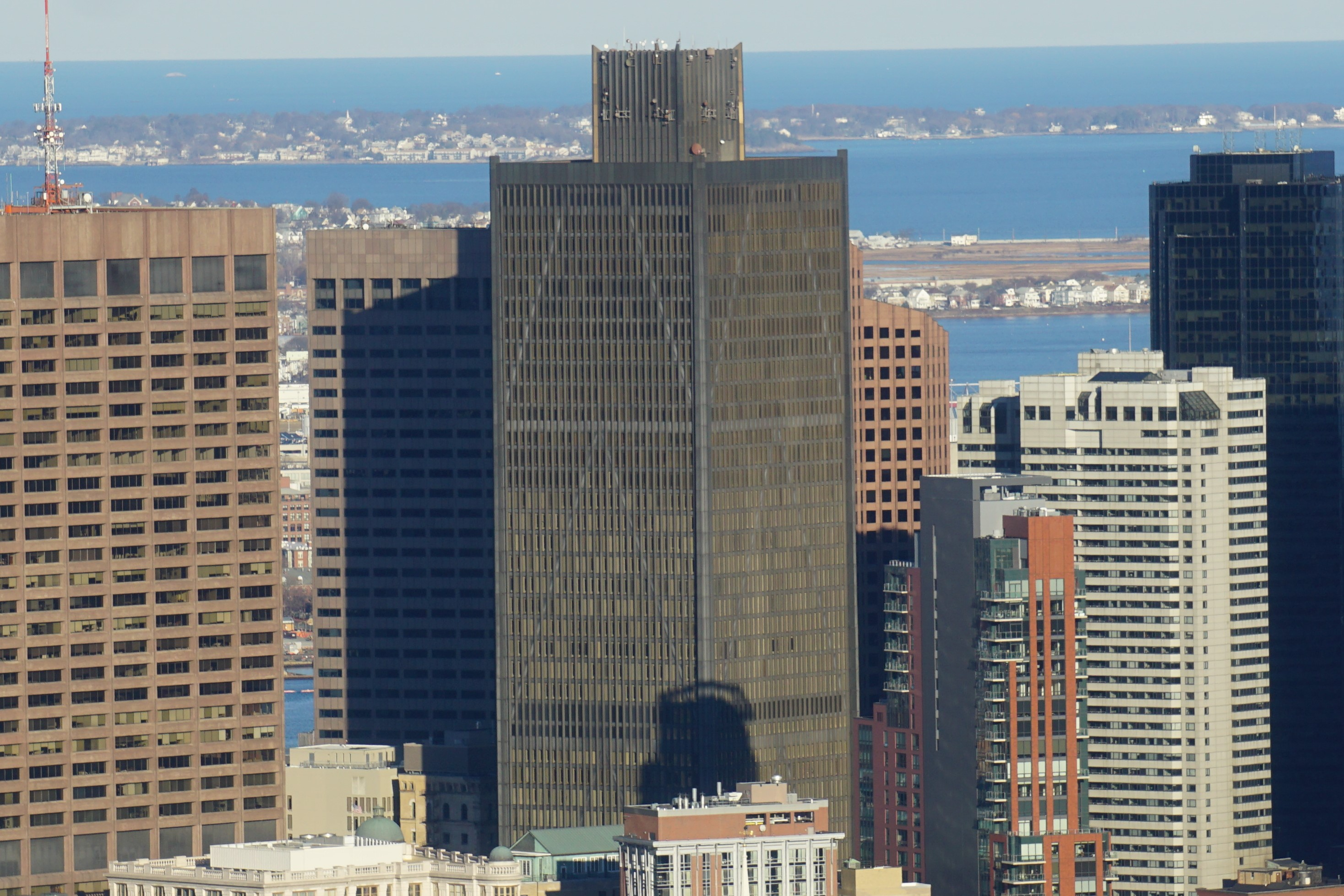
One Boston Place housed the Boston Stock Exchange from 1980 to 1999

== Leadership ==
=== Presidents ===
- Samuel Dana (1834–35)
- S. E. Green (1835–36)
- George W. Pratt (1836–37)
- P.P.F. Degrand (1837–38)
- Enoch Martin (1838–45)
- Charles Dudley Head (1845–46, 1852–55)
- John J. Solely (1846–47)
- Henry White Pickering (1847–52, 1857–60, 1864–70)
- Ossian D. Ashley (1855–57)
- Aaron W. Spencer (1860–62, 1888–91)
- Gilbert Attwood (1862–63)
- James Murray Howe (1863–64)
- Murray R. Ballou (1870–88)
- E. Rollins Morse (1891–93)
- Charles Head (1893–96)
- Lyman B. Greenleaf (1896–98, 1906–11)
- Elisha D. Bangs (1898–1900)
- John Parkinson (1900–03, 1905–06)
- Charles C. Jackson (1903–05)
- Henry Hornblower (1911–14)
- Walter Jackson (1914–17)
- Philip W. Wrenn (1917–19)
- Frank W. Remick (1919–24)
- William N. Goodnow (1924–26)
- Jere A. Downs (1926–30)
- James S. Dean (1930–33)
- Charles A. Collins (1933–35)
- William B. Long (1936–39)
- John Yerxa (1939–42)
- Archibald R. Giroux (1942–43)
- Stearns Poor (1943–46)
- Harry W. Besse (1946–62)
- Weston Adams (1962–64)
- R. Willis Leith Jr. (1964–65)
- Frederick Moss (1965–69)
- James E. Dowd (1969–82)

=== Chairmen/CEOs ===
- Charles J. Mohr (1981–85)
- William G. Morton Jr. (1985–2001)
- Kenneth R. Leibler (2001–04)
- Michael J. Curran (2004–07)

== See also ==
- List of former stock exchanges in the Americas
- List of stock exchange mergers in the Americas
- Stock exchanges in the United States
