= Peter Paul =

Peter Paul may refer to:

== Full name ==
- Peter Paul (actor) (born 1957), American actor, producer, television personality and bodybuilder
- Peter F. Paul (born 1948), American lawyer, entrepreneur, and convicted criminal
- Peter Lewis Paul (1902–1989), Canadian Maliseet ethnohistorian
- Peter Paul Halajian (died 1927), Armenian American emigrant confectioner and businessman who created Peter Paul Candy Manufacturing Company in 1919

== Other uses ==
- Peter Paul (given names), includes a list
- Pradeeban Peter-Paul (born 1977), Canadian table tennis player
- Peter Paul Candy Manufacturing Company, now a subsidiary of Hershey Foods

== See also ==
- Peter and Paul (disambiguation)
- Peter, Paul and Mary, an American folk group
