= Joseph Albert Alberdingk Thijm =

Dutch writer (1820–1889)

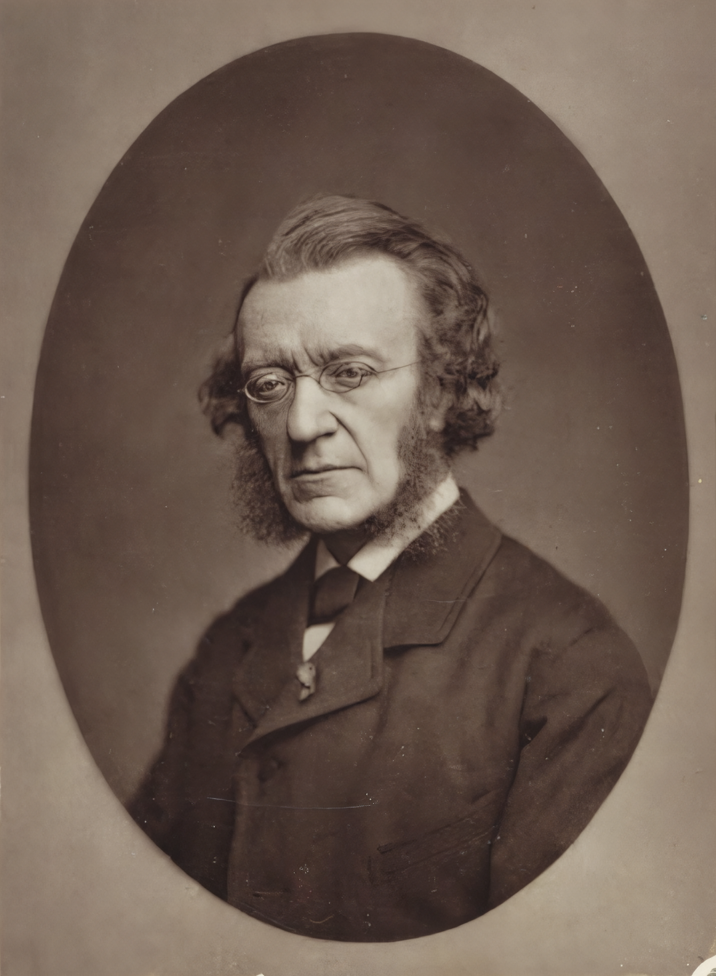
- Portrait of Joseph Thijm
- Born: 8 July 1820; Amsterdam, Netherlands
- Died: 17 March 1889 (aged 68); Amsterdam, Netherlands
- Relatives: Paul Alberdingk Thijm (brother)

Joseph Albert Alberdingk Thijm (8 July 1820 – 17 March 1889) was a Dutch writer. In his triple capacity of art critic, philologist, and poet, Alberdingk Thijm was an important figure of Catholic literature. After finishing his studies in his native city, he took up a commercial career.

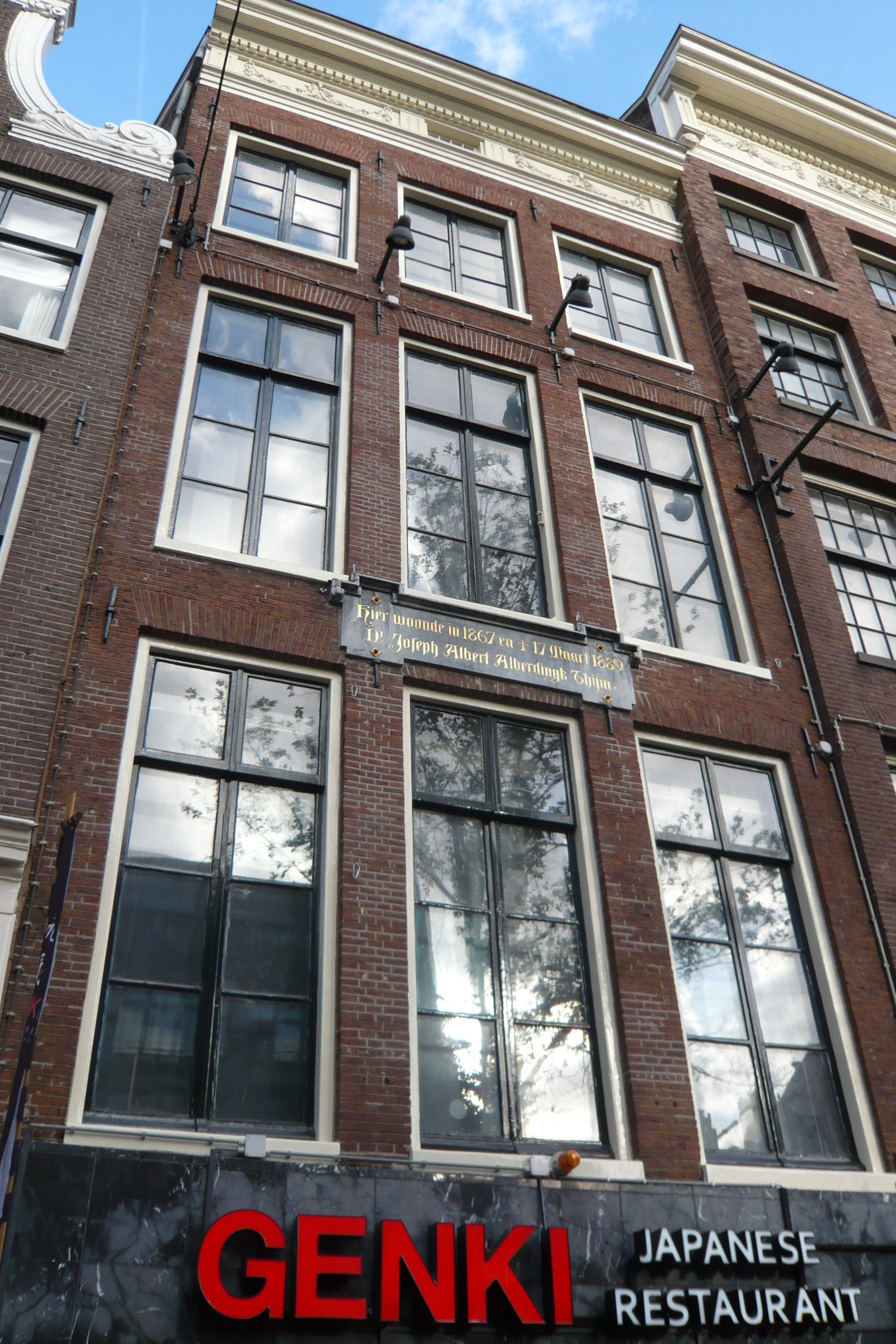
His former house (today a Japanese restaurant) with memorial gable stone on the facade in Amsterdam on Nieuwezijds Voorburgwal.

== Writing ==
He made his entry into the literary world as an art critic in the Spectator in 1842, and immediately attracted attention by his views and his style. The following year he published an essay on the spelling of hybrid words, in which he came out as a philologist. In 1855 he founded the literary magazine Dietsche Warande, which is still in existence under the title DWB.

In his poems, he shows that he is a disciple of Willem Bilderdijk. This he himself declares in his celebrated poem "U min ik, Oude met uw stroefgeplooide trekken" (I love you, old one, with your rugged features).

As a Catholic writer, "nil nisi per Christum" was his motto. He was influential in the Catholic revival, and the restoration of the hierarchy in the Netherlands. In 1852 Thijm sent a memorial to Rome setting forth the historic reasons for considering Utrecht to be the traditional archiepiscopal see of the Netherlands, and the anxiety of the Catholics at that time that the historic tradition be not broken.

Besides the periodical "Dietsche Warande" which he edited from 1855 to 1886, the people's almanac for the Catholics of the Netherlands (1852–89), and numberless brochures in defence of the Church and church history, his most important works are: "Het Voorgeborchte", "Palet en Harp", "Portretten van Joost van den Vondel", "Verspreide Verhalen", "Kerstliederen", "De la Litérature Néerlandaise", "Karolingische Verhalen", "De Heilige Linie". His last efforts were devoted to the preparation of a complete edition of the works of Joost van den Vondel.

== Family ==
Writer Peter Paul Maria Alberdingk Thijm was his brother.

Alberdingk Thijm was a friend of architect Pierre Cuypers. His writings about Catholic art were a major influence on Cuypers in the first decades of his career. In 1859, Cuypers married Alberdingk Thijm's sister Antoinette.

== Commemoration ==
- There is an Alberdingk Thijm street in Amsterdam, Arnhem, Gendringen, Etten-Leur, Haarlem, 's-Hertogenbosch, Rotterdam, Schiedam, Terneuzen (city), Tilburg, Utrecht, Venlo, Vlijmen and Waalwijk (city).
- The Alberdingk Thijm College in Hilversum is named after him.

== Sources ==
- Katholieke Illustratie (1889)
- Dietsche Warande (1889), p. 239
- Van de Duys (Amsterdam, 1896);
- Busken Huet, Litterarische Fantasieen en Kritieken (Haarlem, 1881);
- Levensgeschiedenissen van de leden der Maatschappij van Letterkunde van Leiden (Leiden, 1889)
