= P. P. F. Degrand =

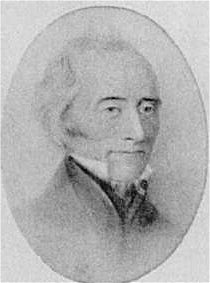
P. P. F. Degrand

Peter Paul Francis Degrand (1787–1855) was a French-born broker and merchant in Boston, Massachusetts.

== Business career ==
Degrand was born in Marseille, France, and moved to Boston around 1803. He published the Boston Weekly Report in the 1820s, possibly employing Edgar Allan Poe for two weeks as a clerk and perhaps also as a reporter. He was one of the thirteen founding members of the Boston Stock Exchange and was described by Clarence W. Barron and Joseph G. Martin as "the man to whose indomitable energy and foresight the existence of the Boston Stock Exchange is largely due". He was a major stockholder in the Western Railroad and was instrumental in securing financial aid from the state during the railroad's early years.

== Personal life ==
Degrand lived on Pinckney Street in Beacon Hill. He was friend with President of the United States John Quincy Adams. He died on December 23, 1855 and was buried in Forest Hills Cemetery. Degrand bequeathed $120,000 to charity, a large part of which was for the acquisition of French-language scientific texts for Harvard University.
