= Peter and Paul =

Peter and Paul may refer to:

- Saint Peter and Paul the Apostle considered together
  - Feast of Saints Peter and Paul, 29 June in the Catholic liturgical calendar
  - St. Peter and St. Paul's Church (disambiguation)
- Peter and Paul (film), 1981 television film about the saints
- Peter und Paul, 1990s German television series
- Peter and Paul Fortress, 1703 citadel of St. Petersburg, Russia

== See also ==
- Peter Paul (disambiguation)
- Peter, Paul and Mary
