= Pierpaolo =

Pierpaolo is a masculine Italian given name. Notable people with the name include:

- Pierpaolo Barbieri (born 1987), Argentine businessman
- Pierpaolo Bisoli (born 1966), Italian football player and manager
- Pierpaolo Cristofori (born 1956), Italian modern pentathlete
- Pierpaolo De Negri (born 1986), Italian cyclist
- Pierpaolo Donati (born 1946), Italian sociologist
- Pierpaolo Ferrazzi (born 1965), Italian slalom canoeist
- Pierpaolo Frattini (born 1984), Italian rower
- Pierpaolo Monti, Italian musician
- Pierpaolo Parisio (1473–1545), Italian cardinal
- Pierpaolo Pedroni (1964–2009), Italian rugby player, referee and commentator
- Pierpaolo Piccioli (born 1967), Italian fashion designer
- Pierpaolo Sileri (born 1972), Italian politician and surgeon
- Pierpaolo Spangaro (1942–2011), Italian swimmer
