= Robert Means Lawrence =

American physician and writer (1847-1935)

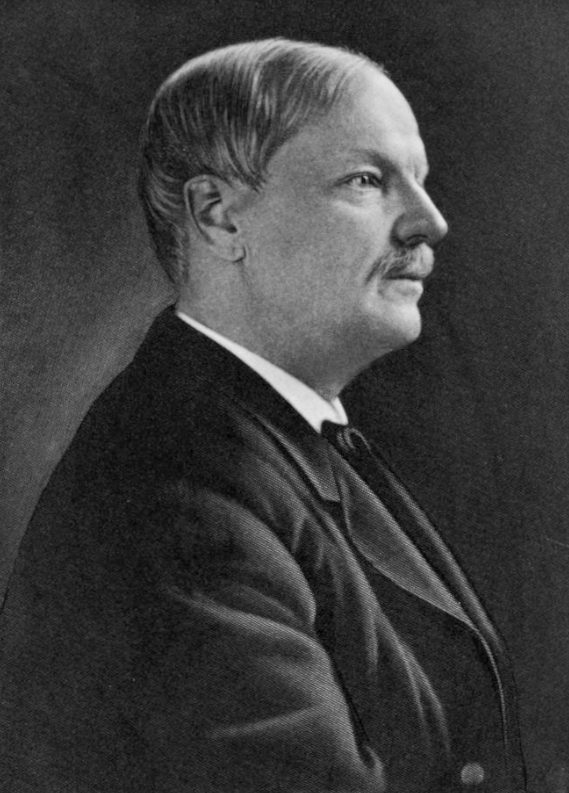
- Born: May 14, 1847; Boston, Massachusetts
- Died: March 7, 1935 (aged 87); Boston, Massachusetts
- Burial place: Mount Auburn Cemetery
- Education: Harvard Medical School
- Occupations: Physician, writer
- Spouse: Katherine Lawrence Cleaveland (m. 1870)

Robert Means Lawrence (May 14, 1847 – March 7, 1935) was an American physician and writer.

== Biography ==
Lawrence was born in Boston. His parents were William Richards Lawrence and Susan Coombs Dana. His grandfather was Amos Adams Lawrence. He attended Harvard Medical School where he received his M.D. in 1873. He worked as a physician at the Boston Dispensary and as an assistant surgeon of the First Regiment of Massachusetts Volunteers (1877-1882).

He married Katherine Lawrence Cleaveland on June 30, 1870 and lived in Lexington, Massachusetts. They had two daughters, Madeline and Isabel. He later lived in Washington and then Boston.

Lawrence was interested in genealogy. He was baptized at Cathedral Church of St. Paul and became a warden of the congregation.

He died at his home in Boston on March 7, 1935, and was buried at Mount Auburn Cemetery.

== Publications ==
- Historical Sketches of Some Members of the Lawrence Family (1888)
- The Magic of the Horseshoe (1898)
- The Descendants of Major Samuel Lawrence, of Groton, Massachusetts, With Some Mention of Allied Families (1904)
- Primitive Therapy and Quackery (1910)
- The Reverend Amos Adams, A.M. (1728-1775): Patriot Minister of Roxbury, Massachusetts (1912)
- The Site of Saint Paul's Cathedral, Boston, and Its Neighborhood (1916)
- Old Park Street and Its Vicinity (1922)
- New England Colonial Life (1927)
