= Hohman =

Hohman is a surname. Notable people with the surname include:

- Bill Hohman (1903–1968), American baseball player
- Elmo Paul Hohman (1894-1977), American economist
- George Hohman (1932-2006), American politician, expelled from the Alaska Senate in 1982 following a bribery conviction
- John George Hohman, German-American printer
- Jon Hohman, American football player

== See also ==
- Hohmann (disambiguation)
