= Bill Homan =

Australian rules footballer

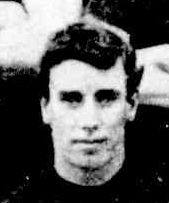

Personal information
- Full name: William Alfred Ernest Homan
- Born: 25 December 1880; Collingwood, Victoria
- Died: 1 May 1963 (aged 82); Collingwood, Victoria
- Original team: Collingwood Juniors

Playing career^{1}
Years	Club	Games (Goals)
1904–05	Collingwood	12 (8)
1907–08	Melbourne	18 (4)
Total		30 (12)
- ^{1} Playing statistics correct to the end of 1908.

William Alfred Ernest Homan (25 December 1880 – 1 May 1963) was an Australian rules footballer who played with Collingwood and Melbourne in the Victorian Football League (VFL).
