= Solarized architectural glass =

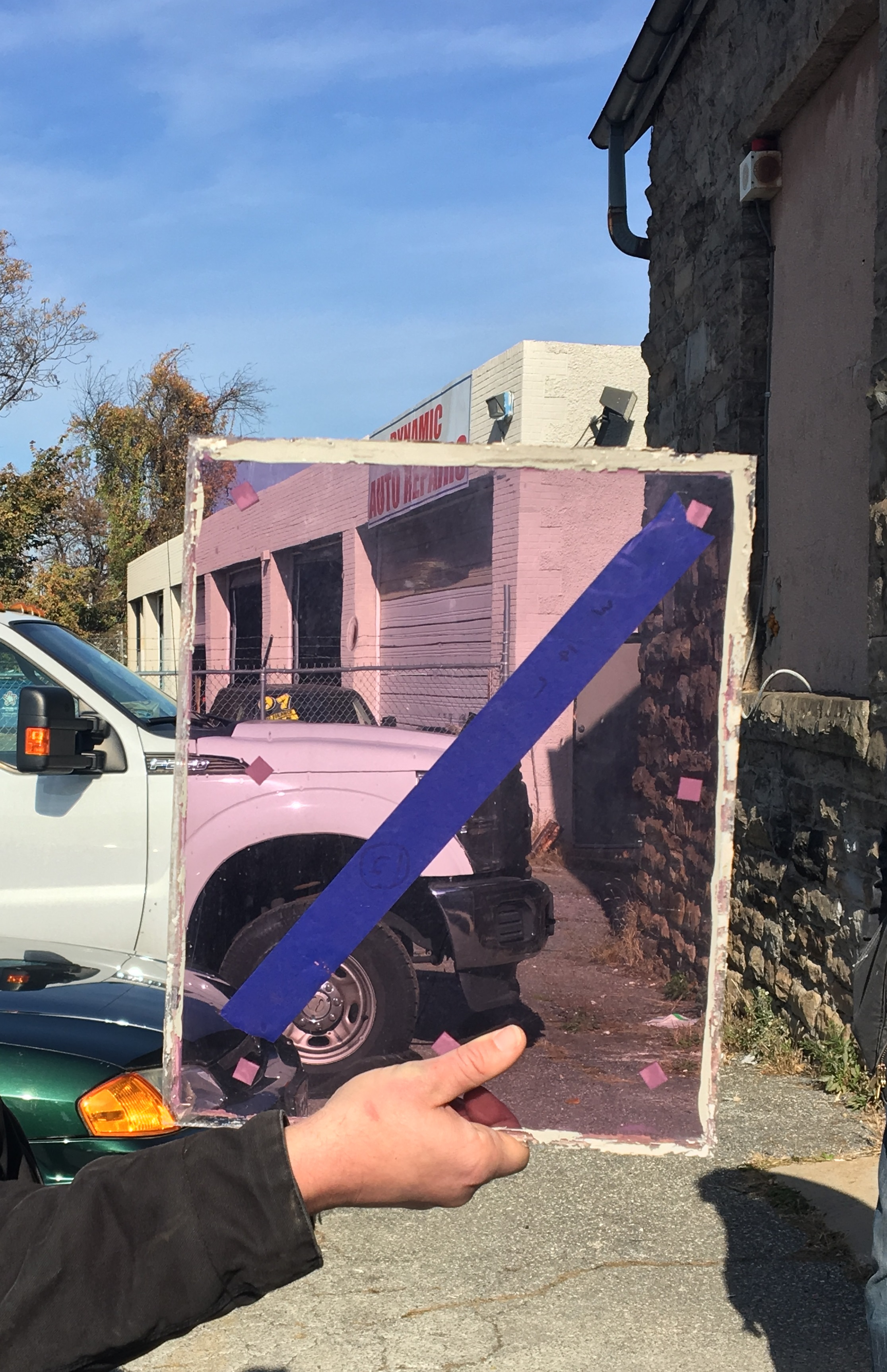
Single pane of historic solarized architectural glass, removed from its frame

Solarized architectural glass is a type of architectural glass, used as a building material, that has changed color as a result of a chemical reaction between a glass decolorizer and ultraviolet radiation – a process known as solarization. Sometimes called desert glass or sun-purpled glass, solarized glass is most commonly observed in bottles and glassware. However, solarized glass does occasionally appear in architectural contexts and uses, especially window panes, doorknobs, and pavement lights. The physical characteristics and the relative rarity of this glass for windows has meant that it is understood as a distinct glass type.

== Chemical description ==
Although silica glass is naturally colorless, chemical imperfections in naturally occurring silica sometimes results in discoloration during the production process. Historically, glass makers have compensated for this by adding a chemical decolorizer. Since ancient times, one of the most common chemical decolorizers has been manganese dioxide (MnO_{2}), which in small quantities, is an effective additive to produce clear glass. However, in large quantities, glass treated with manganese dioxide photo-oxidizes when exposed to ultra-violet sunlight over a period of years to decades. The result is glass that changes from a clear to a lavender-purple color. In addition to manganese dioxide, other decolorizers have been historically used that undergo photo-oxidation. For example, selenium and cerium have both been used in the past as decolorizers. In large quantities, these chemicals have turned glass yellow and amber respectively when exposed to ultra-violet light.

== Historical uses ==
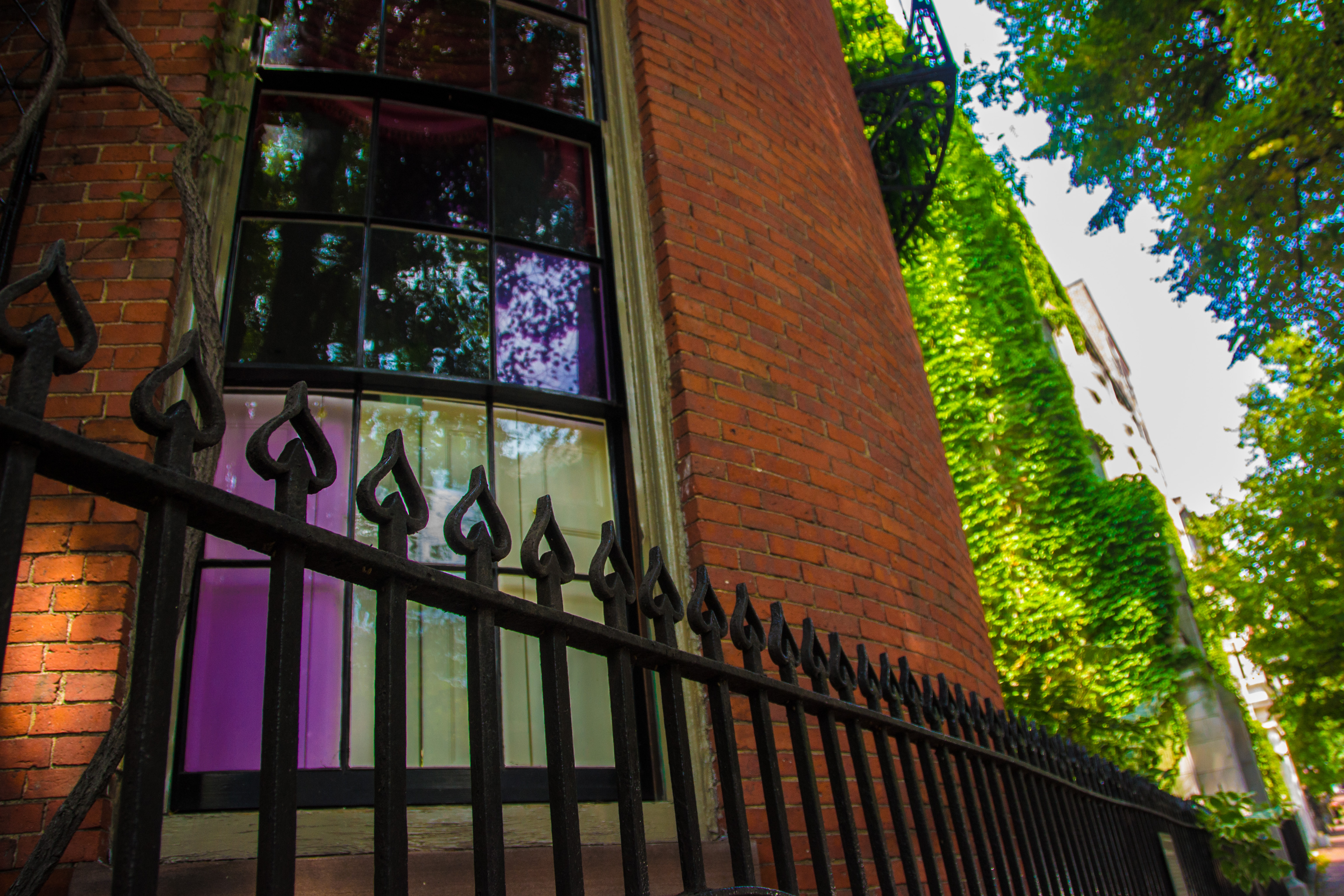
Purple window glass in Boston

Although most commonly observed as bottles and glassware, solarized glass does occasionally appear in architectural contexts and uses. Most notably, many early 19th century houses in the neighborhood of Beacon Hill, Boston, MA have windows with purple panes of glass. The color of these panes was the result of an excess of manganese dioxide added in the glass making process from about 1800 to 1830. Since this glass was originally intended to be clear, the purple color was actually a manufacturer's mistake. Some apocryphal stories credit this glass to a French maker that accidentally imported defective glass but ceased production after it was discovered the glass would turn purple. For this reason, 19th century solarized architectural glass is rare.

Nevertheless, in Boston, the purple glass came to be seen as a desirable character mark for these houses and was associated with elegance and the upper classes. By the early 20th century, homeowners and builders were mimicking the original solarized glass by retrofitting older windows with solarized glass that never previously existed in those homes.

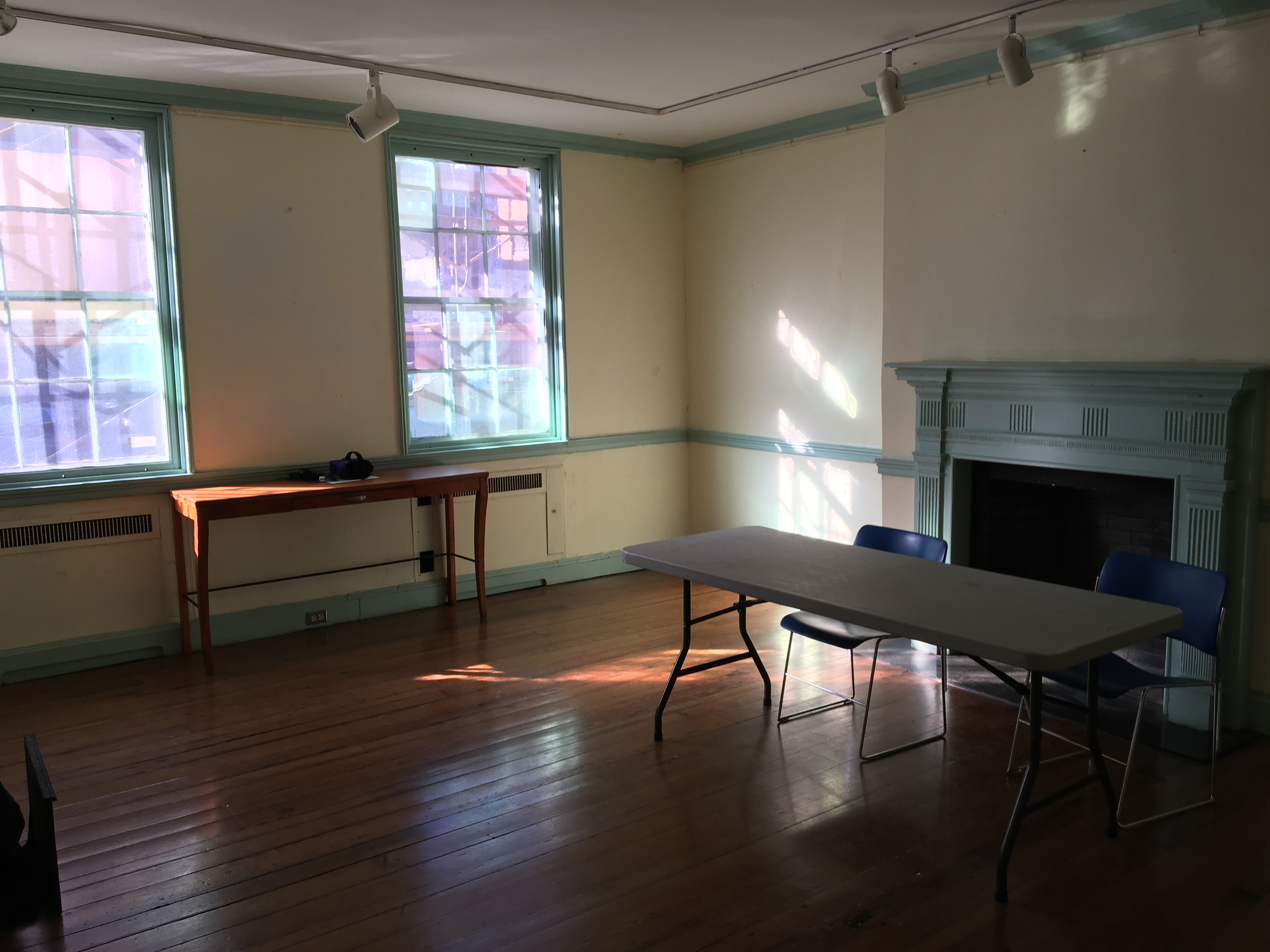
Solarized architectural glass found in a historic window

== Physical characteristics ==
Solarized architectural glass is not, in itself, a distinct glass making process. Solarized glass used in windows was historically made either by the crown glass method or is cylinder blown sheet glass. However, the striking color of this glass, coupled with its rarity and distinctive physical characteristics means that it is a distinct sub-type of architectural glass and a character-defining feature for many historic buildings.

This glass exhibits several physical characteristics and properties. The shade of the purple color is dependent on the level of sunlight exposure. This means that panes of solarized glass will turn a darker purple if they receive heavy exposure to light, such as on the south facing façade of a building. Likewise, a recessed window will receive less light and therefore turn a lighter shade of purple. Further, the depth of the purple shade is also dependent on the level of manganese dioxide present in the glass. Those portions of this glass that do not receive light exposure – such as along the edges where the glass meets the window muntin – do not undergo the same photo-oxidation and remain clear. Finally, the glass is very brittle and highly delicate. It is uncertain if this is a result of the manganese oxide or other methods as part of the manufacturing process. In addition to solarized window glass, solarized glass is also found in other architectural contexts, such as glass doorknobs.
