= Homann =

Homann is a surname. Notable people with the surname include:

- Heinrich Homann (1911–1994), East German politician
- Henning Homann (born 1979), German politician
- Henriette Homann (1819–1892), Norwegian photographer and painter
- Johann Homann (1664–1724), German geographer and cartographer
- Peter Homann (born 1960), Australian Paralympic cyclist
- Theodor Homann (1948–2010), German footballer, -coach and businessman

== See also ==
- Christian Homann Schweigaard (1838–1899), Norwegian politician
- Homan (disambiguation)
- Hohmann (disambiguation)
