= John Homans =

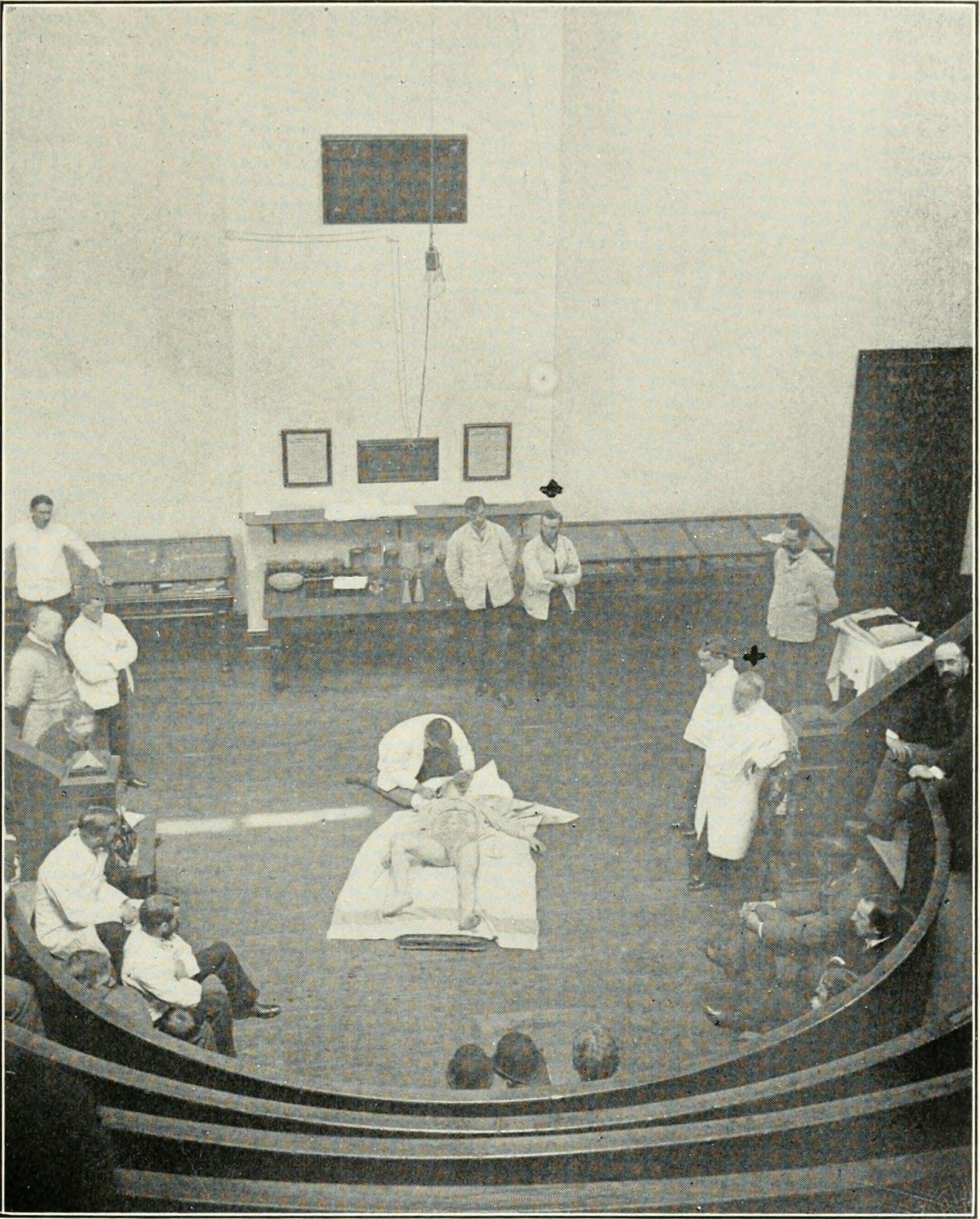
Homans about to reduce a dislocation of the hip at the Massachusetts General Hospital, Old Bigelow Amphitheatre.

John Homans (1877–1954) was an American surgeon who described Homans' sign and Homans' operation.

He was born in Boston, Massachusetts, and was educated at Harvard University and Harvard Medical School. His residency was undertaken at Massachusetts General Hospital, and was followed by work in Baltimore and London. He returned to Boston to the Peter Bent Brigham Hospital in 1912. Towards the end of his career he worked at Yale University as the Carmalt Visiting Professor, returning to Peter Bent Brigham during World War II.

Homans worked on developing hypophysectomy with Harvey Cushing, and they and Samuel James Crowe published the first evidence of the link between the pituitary gland and the reproductive system in 1910.

He later worked on peripheral vascular disease, helping to popularise the ligation of the saphenofemoral junction for treatment of varicose veins, and advocating ligation of the subsartorial vein to stop migrating clots causing pulmonary embolus. He described the sign which bears his name in 1944, and reported the first instance of deep venous thrombosis occurring in flight in 1954 in a doctor who had flown between Boston and Caracas. He was also interested in lymphoedema, developing the Homans operation for this condition.

Homans was a founding member of the Society for Vascular Surgery, the fourth meeting of which saw the establishment of the John Homans lecture in his honour. He is also commemorated by the John Homans Chair of Surgery at Harvard Medical School and the John Homans Fellowship in Vascular Surgery at Peter Bent Brigham Hospital.
