= Pierre-Paul (name) =

Pierre-Paul is a French double name, formed using the names Pierre and Paul.

== List of people ==
=== Given name ===
- Pierre-Paul Durieu (1830–1899), Roman Catholic missionary and bishop
- Pierre-Paul Grassé (1895–1985), French zoologist
- Pierre-Paul Guieysse (1841–1914), French Socialist politician
- Pierre-Paul Lemercier de La Rivière de Saint-Médard (1719–1801), French colonial administrator and economist
- Pierre-Paul Margane de Lavaltrie (1743–1810), seigneur and political figure in Lower Canada
- Pierre-Paul Prud'hon (1758–1823), French Romantic painter and draughtsman
- Pierre-Paul Renders (born 1963), Belgian film director and screenwriter
- Pierre-Paul Riquet (1609?–1680), French engineer and canal builder
- Pierre-Paul Saunier (1751–1818), French gardener
- Pierre-Paul Schweitzer (1912–1994), French Managing Director of the IMF
- Pierre-Paul Sirven (1709–1777), French archivist and notary

=== Surname ===
- Jason Pierre-Paul (born 1989), American football player
