= Homan Bay =

Bay in Nunavut, Canada

- Location within Nunavut
- Location: M'Clintock Channel
- Coordinates: 70°31′N 102°51′W
- Basin countries: Canada
- Settlements: Uninhabited

Homan Bay is an Arctic waterway in the Kitikmeot Region, Nunavut, Canada. It is located in western M'Clintock Channel, off the eastern coast of Victoria Island. It is separated from Denmark Bay, 26 km (16 mi) to the west by a peninsula with a narrow isthmus.
