= Peter Paul Maria Alberdingk Thijm =

Dutch academic and writer (1827–1904)

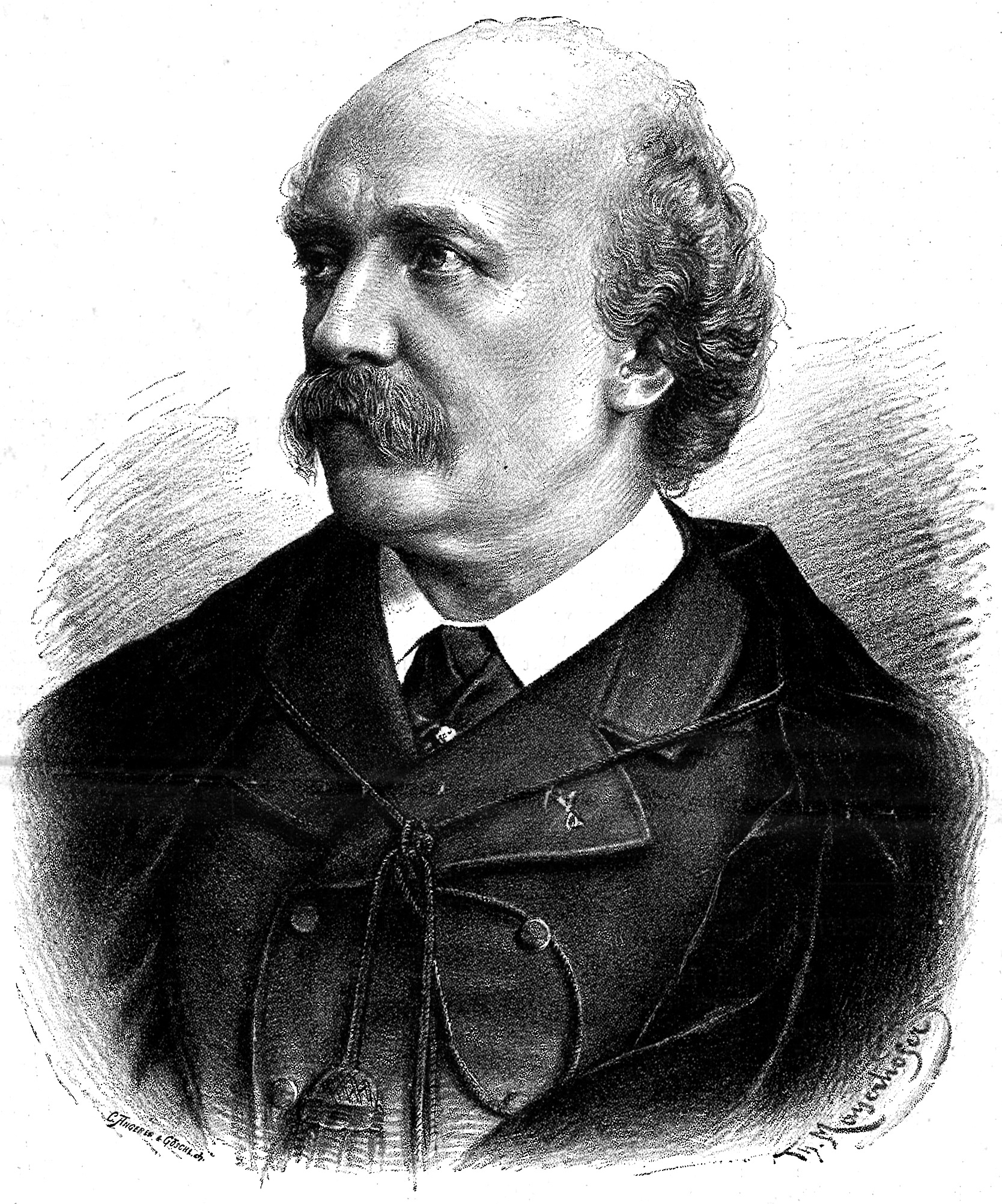
Portrait of Paul Alberdingk Thijm. From Nieuwe Belgische Illustratie, jaargang 4, nr. 19, p. 145.

Peter Paul Maria Alberdingk Thijm (21 October 1827, at Amsterdam – 1 February 1904, at Leuven) was a Dutch academic and writer.

== Life ==
He made his studies in his home city, at first at the Gymnasium and later at the Athenaeum, from which he graduated in letters and history in 1857. For some years he was instructor in history in Maastricht. After being called to a professorship in the Catholic University of Leuven in 1870, he succeeded in establishing a chair for the special study of the history of the literature of the Netherlands.

He was vice president of the student association "Met Tijd en Vlijt" and of "Constantius Buter". He was also the member of the Royal Academy of Dutch language and literature, and for a time, its president. From 1888 on, Paul Thijm edited the periodical Dietsche Warande, which he transplanted into Belgium.

He was the first chairman of the Davidsfonds (1875 - 1878).

== Family ==
The writer Joseph Albert Alberdingk Thijm was his brother.

== Works ==
His main works are:

- "De H. Willibrord, Apostel der Nederlanden" (1867);
- "Karel de groote en zijne eeuw" (1866);
- "De gestichten van liefdadigheid in België, van Karel de Groote tot aan de XVIde eeuw", awarded a prize by the Royal Academy of Science, Letters and Fine Arts of Belgium (1883);
- "Schets der Algemeene Geschiedenis" (1870);
- "Vroolijke historie van Ph. van Marnix" (1876);
- "Spiegel van Nederlandsche letteren" (1877).
