= Homans sign =

- Differential diagnosis: deep vein thrombosis

In medicine, Homans' sign (sometimes spelled as Homans sign, erroneously Homan's sign or called dorsiflexion sign) is considered by some physicians to be a sign of deep vein thrombosis (DVT). It was defined by John Homans in 1941 as discomfort behind the knee upon forced dorsiflexion of the foot. After many examples of false-positive Homans' signs were reported, Homans redefined it in 1944, stating that "discomfort need have no part in the reaction", and that increased resistance, involuntary flexure of the knee or pain in the calf upon forced dorsiflexion should be considered positive responses.

It is estimated to have a sensitivity of 10-54% and a specificity of 39-89%, and is thus considered to have no diagnostic value, since a positive sign does not indicate DVT and a negative sign does not rule it out. Still, it is widely used in clinical practice, probably because of its historical role prior to the availability of more reliable diagnostic studies (such as a D-dimer titration or a Doppler ultrasound), as well the ease of eliciting it. An elevated D-dimer in the elderly population has no predictive value for deep venous thrombosis. Signs and symptoms of DVT in general are not sufficiently sensitive or specific to make a diagnosis, being helpful only to help determine the likelihood of a DVT (with the use of a clinical prediction rule such as the Wells score).

There may exist some concern that eliciting this sign may be dangerous and that it should not be elicited.
