= Boston Fire Department =

Municipal agency in Massachusetts, US

Operational area
- Country: United States
- State: Massachusetts
- City: Boston

Agency overview
- Established: 1678, roots in 1631
- Annual calls: 74,191 (2013)
- Employees: 1,611 (2014): 1,467 uniformed firefighting personnel; 68 fire alarm operators; 76 civilian members
- Annual budget: $187,849,951 (2014)
- Staffing: Career
- Commissioner: Rodney Marshall
- EMS level: First responder
- IAFF: 718
- Motto: First in the Nation

Facilities and equipment
- Divisions: 2
- Battalions: 10
- Stations: 34
- Engines: 33
- Trucks: 20
- Platforms: 2
- Rescues: 2
- HAZMAT: 1
- USAR: 1
- Wildland: 2
- Fireboats: 2
- Rescue boats: 2
- Light and air: 1

Website
- Official website
- IAFF website

The Boston Fire Department provides fire services and first responder emergency medical services to the city of Boston, Massachusetts. It also responds to such incidents as motor vehicle accidents, hazardous material spills, utility mishaps, floods, explosions, and construction accidents among others.

The Boston Fire Department was established as the first paid fire department in the United States, and is the largest municipal fire department in New England serving approximately 685,000 people living in the 48.4-square-mile (125 km^{2}) area of the city proper. Additionally, it actively participates in MetroFire, the fire services mutual aid system which serves it and 35 other fire departments in the surrounding area.

In and around Boston, firefighters are sometimes referred to as Jakes.

== History ==
=== 1631−1678 ===
The Boston Fire Department traces its roots back to 1631, a year after the city was founded, when the first fire ordinance was adopted. In what then was the Massachusetts Bay Colony of the Kingdom of England, the city banned thatched roofs and wooden chimneys. However, it wasn't until 1653 that the first hand engine was appropriated to provide pressure for water lines.

=== 1678−1837 ===
In 1678, the city founded a paid fire department, and hired Thomas Atkins to be the first fire chief. On February 1, 1711, the town appointed a group of Fire Wards, each responsible for the operation and maintenance of equipment assigned to a region of the city. The grandfather of Herman Melville, Thomas Melvill, served as a town fire ward from 1779 to 1825; his great-grandfather, Allen Melvill, served as a firefighter from 1733 to 1761. It was not until 1799 that the first leather fire hose was used, after being imported from England.

=== 1837−1910 ===
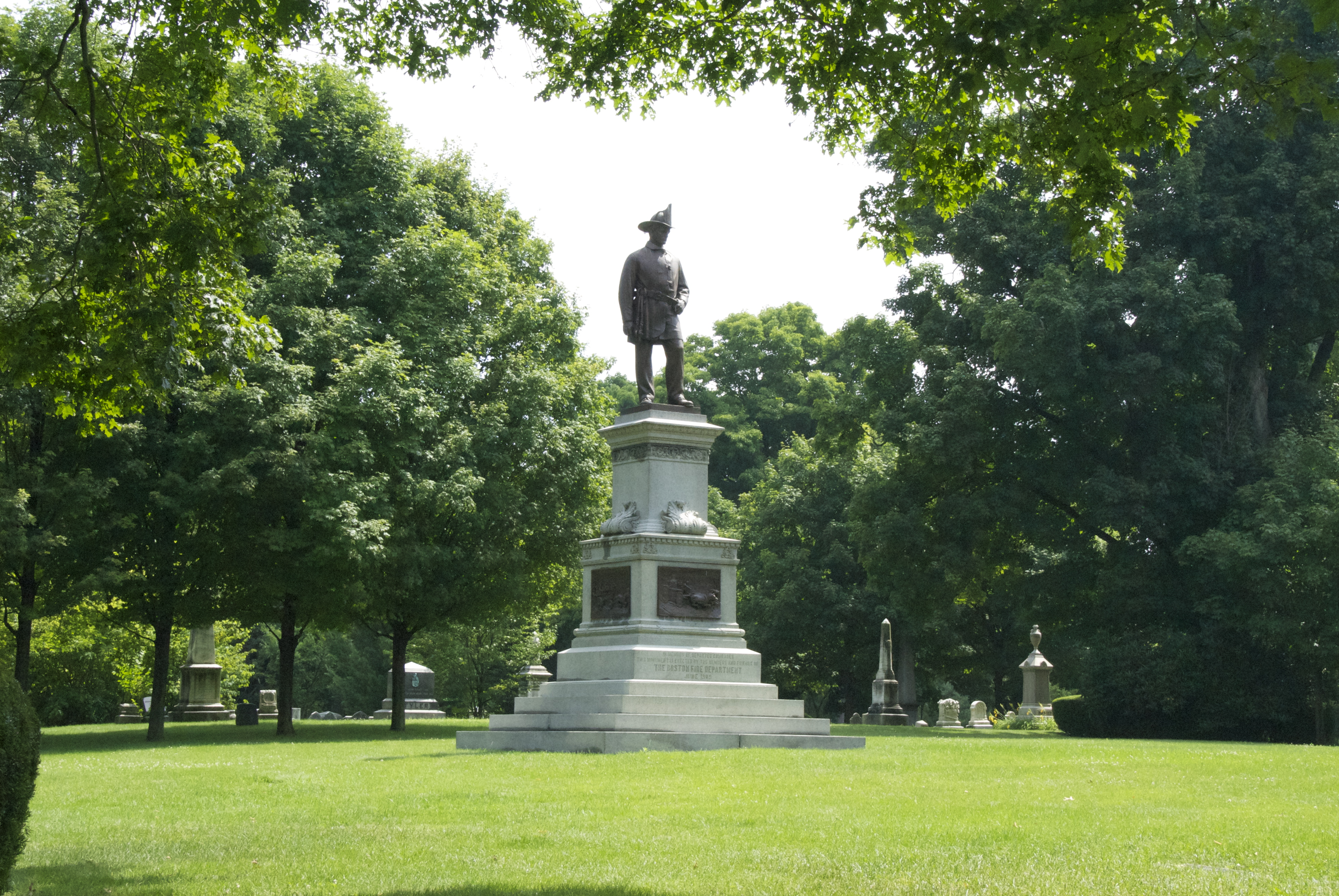
Firemen's Memorial by John A. Wilson

The department underwent its first reorganization in 1837 when the hand engine department reorganized, reducing the number of active engines to fourteen. By December 31, 1858, the department had 14 hand engines, 3 hook and ladder carriages, and 6 hydrant (hose) carriages. On November 1, 1859, Engine Co. 8 began service as the first steam engine in the department. The reorganization of 1859-60 replaced the department's 14 hand engines with 11 new steam engines. The organizational structure of the department, as it still exists today, developed in that same period.

The department was the first in the world to utilize the telegraph to alert fire fighters of an emergency, installing the system in 1851. The first fire alarm was transmitted via the fire alarm telegraph system on April 29, 1852. The famous Boston fire of 1872 led to the appointment of a board of fire commissioners. The Boston Fire Department also provided assistance in the Great Chelsea Fire of 1908 and the Great Salem Fire of 1914. The department purchased its first steam fireboat in 1873, and installed fire poles in the stations in 1881.

=== Equipment changes, 1910−present ===
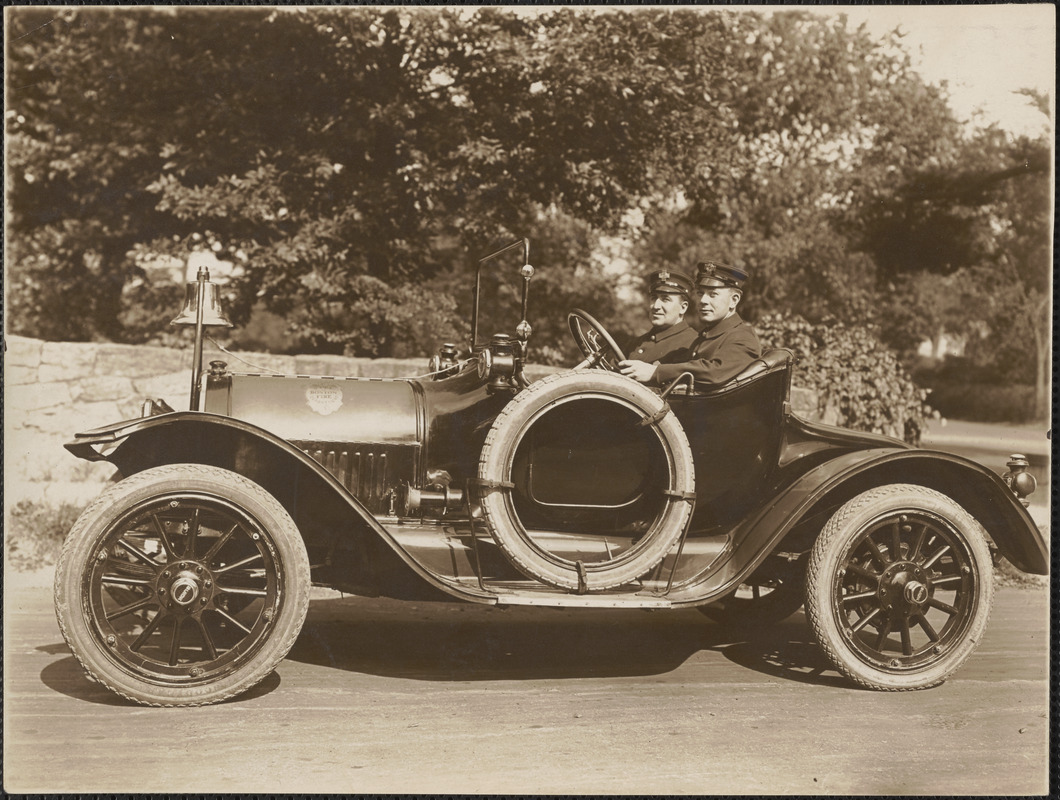
Two fire fighters driving open Boston Fire car, ca. 1920-1960

On July 29, 1910, the department purchased its first motorized apparatus. From 1914 until 1923, horse drawn engines as well as steam and motorized engine companies were in use in Boston. Ladder 24 was the last company to replace its horses in 1923 when it became motorized. In 1925, the last fire horses were retired. It wasn't until 1926 that the last steam engine was converted to a motorized engine. The department first started using radio communication in 1925, installing radios in the fireboats, chiefs' cars, and rescue companies.

By 1960, the department operated 48 engines, 29 ladders, one rescue, and two fireboats. By the end of the decade, the standard 85-foot (26 m) ladder trucks were replaced by 100-foot (30 m) aerial ladders with tillers.

In the 1970s, the department experimented with lime-green colored apparatus, but reverted to the traditional red in 1984, when the department made the switch to E-One fire apparatus. In the early 1980s, an arson ring caused over 600 fires, many reaching multiple-alarm status. The group was ultimately caught and convicted.

Also in the early 1980s, the department experienced a dramatic number of cutbacks due to budget cuts. The number of Engine Companies dropped from 43 to 33, the Fire Brigade was disbanded (only to be reopened in the mid-80's), the number of Ladder Companies went from 28 to 21, and one of the two Tower Companies was disbanded and reduced to a regular Ladder Company (bringing the total to 22 Ladder Companies). Rescue 2 was disbanded, but reorganized in 1986.

=== 2007 Boston bomb scare ===
On January 31, 2007, the department, Boston Police, and the United States Department of Homeland Security removed LED advertisements resembling the mooninite characters of the Cartoon Network show Aqua Teen Hunger Force for its movie which had premiered at the time, Aqua Teen Hunger Force Colon Movie Film for Theaters. The advertisements, dispersed throughout the city by two individuals hired by Turner Broadcasting, Interference, Inc., and Cartoon Network, were mistaken for homemade explosives. A civil settlement was eventually reached with Turner, Interference, and Cartoon Network for some portion of the costs incurred by Boston Police and Department of Homeland Security in responding to the events. One of Cartoon Network's managerial staff also resigned in the aftermath.

=== 2013 Boston Marathon Bombing ===
On June 3, 2013, Chief Steve Abraira resigned citing public criticism from his deputies over his response to the Boston Marathon bombing.

=== Harassment and gender and racial imbalance ===
After sexual harassment complaints by several women, the Boston Fire Department agreed to improve conditions for women under the terms of the 1996 Hansford Decree, including providing gender-separated bathrooms and sleeping areas.

In 2018, firefighter David Sanchez sexually assaulted a fellow firefighter in a firehouse on Centre Street in Jamaica Plain. The victim, Nathalie Fontanez, later said that the other men in the firehouse sided with the assailant, that she had been hazed and discriminated against because she was female and Latina, and that she had been retaliated against for reporting sexually inappropriate behavior. She cited the example of being denied a transfer to the Fire Investigation Unit on the grounds it was for more senior firefighters, only to see the job go to a white man who started in the department on the same day. The city reached a $3.2 million settlement for the complaint and launched a retraining initiative. Other female firefighters also reported inappropriate comments, theft of equipment, finding their beds urinated in, inappropriate use of a cell phone app to locate an off-duty female firefighter, fears of being video recorded while naked, and a sexual assault that resulted in no disciplinary action.

The Boston Globe reported that in 2018, out of about 1,500 firefighters, only 16 were women of whom 12 were African American or Hispanic. The City of Boston was estimated to be 23% African American and 20% Hispanic in 2017.

== Organization ==
The Boston Fire Department has six divisions:

Fire Suppression and rescue services
The most visible division of the department, this division provides the fire protection and rescue services for the city of Boston with uniformed firefighters being dispatched to and responding to a variety of emergencies. The services provided include firefighting, first responder emergency medical services, hazardous materials response, vehicle extrication and other services. The department operates engine companies, ladder companies, and rescue companies, and several special units each providing distinctly separate services at a fire or other emergency. These companies and units are under the command of two Divisions commanding ten districts.
Fire Prevention
This division is responsible for maintaining records, granting permits, conducting public education, and inspecting buildings.
Training
This division supervises the development of the fire fighters from probation to retirement. Also, the division conducts research to improve techniques and equipment, evaluating new tools before their implementation. The Emergency Medical Services and the Safety Operations Unit are also within this division.
Personnel
This division includes the Administration Section, Selection Unit, Medical Office, Personnel Assignments of Officer’s Section, and the Employees Assistant Program. The division keeps the records of each fire fighter, communicates with other departments, unions, and agencies, and hears grievances, disciplinary hearings, and appeals.
Emergency Planning and Preparedness
This division was established in 1996 to replace the Special Services Division, providing the city with an Incident Command System, Office of Emergency Management, and Local Emergency Planning Committee.
Special Operations Command
This division was established in 2001 with a goal of recommending training, deployment and equipment for the Boston Fire Department in all areas of rescue services including technical rescue, CBRNE/hazardous materials operations as well as Dive Team and Marine Unit operations.

== Fire commissioners ==
- Henry S. Russell: 1895–1905
- Patrick J. Kennedy (acting): 1905
- Benjamin W. Wells: 1905–1908
- Samuel D. Parker: 1908–1910
- Francis M. Carroll (acting): 1910
- Charles Dudley Daly: 1910–1912
- John H. Dunn (acting): 1912
- Charles H. Cole: 1912–1914
- John M. Minton (acting): 1914
- John Grady: 1914–1919
- John R. Murphy: 1919–1921
- Joseph P. Manning (acting): 1921–1922
- William J. Casey (acting): 1922
- Theodore A. Glynn: 1922–1926
- Thomas F. Sullivan (acting): 1926
- Eugene Hultman: 1926–1930
- Edward F. McLaughlin: 1930–1933
- Eugene M. McSweeney: 1933–1934
- Edward F. McLaughlin: 1934–1938
- William Arthur Reilly: 1938–1945
- John I. Fitzgerald: 1945–1946
- Russell S. Codman Jr.: 1946–1950
- Michael T. Kelleher: 1950–1953
- John F. Cotter: 1953–1954
- Francis X. Cotter: 1954–1959
- Timothy J. O'Connor: 1959–1960
- Henry Scagnoli: 1960–1961
- Thomas Griffin: 1961–1966
- Henry A. Scagnoli (acting): 1966
- William J. Fitzgerald: 1966–1968
- James H. Kelly: 1968–1975
- George Paul: 1975–1985
- Leo Stapleton: 1984–1991
- Martin E. Pierce Jr.: 1991–2000
- Dennis DiMarzio (acting): 2000–2001
- Paul Christian: 2001–2006
- Kevin P. MacCurtain (acting): 2006
- Roderick Fraser: 2006–2014
- John Hasson (acting): 2014
- Joseph E. Finn: 2014–2020
- John Dempsey: 2020–2022
- Paul Burke: 2022–2026
- Rodney Marshall 2026-present

== Ranks ==
The Boston Fire Department rank structure is as follows:

| Title | Dress Uniform Shirt collar insignia | Dress Uniform Shirt sleeve insignia | Notes |
|---|---|---|---|
| Fire Commissioner and Chief of Department | | | The positions of fire commissioner and chief of department were combined in 2014. |
| Chief of Operations | | | There are 2 chiefs of operations. |
| Deputy Chief | | | |
| District Chief | | | |
| Captain | | | |
| Lieutenant | | | |
| Firefighter | | | |

== Firehouses and apparatus ==
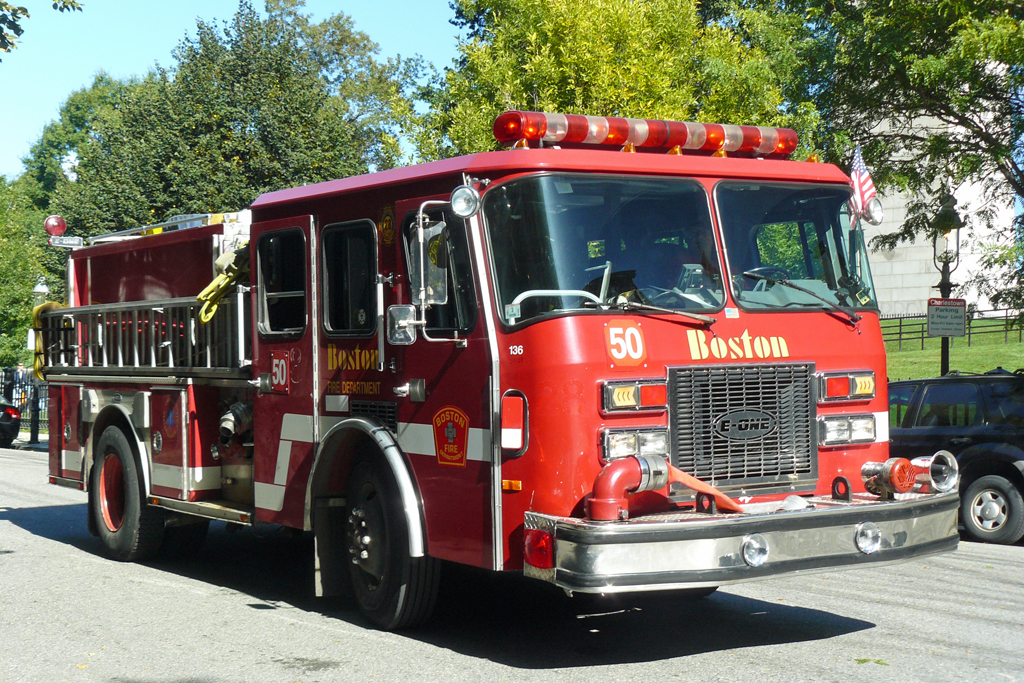
Engine Company 50, quartered in Charlestown, utilizing a spare apparatus

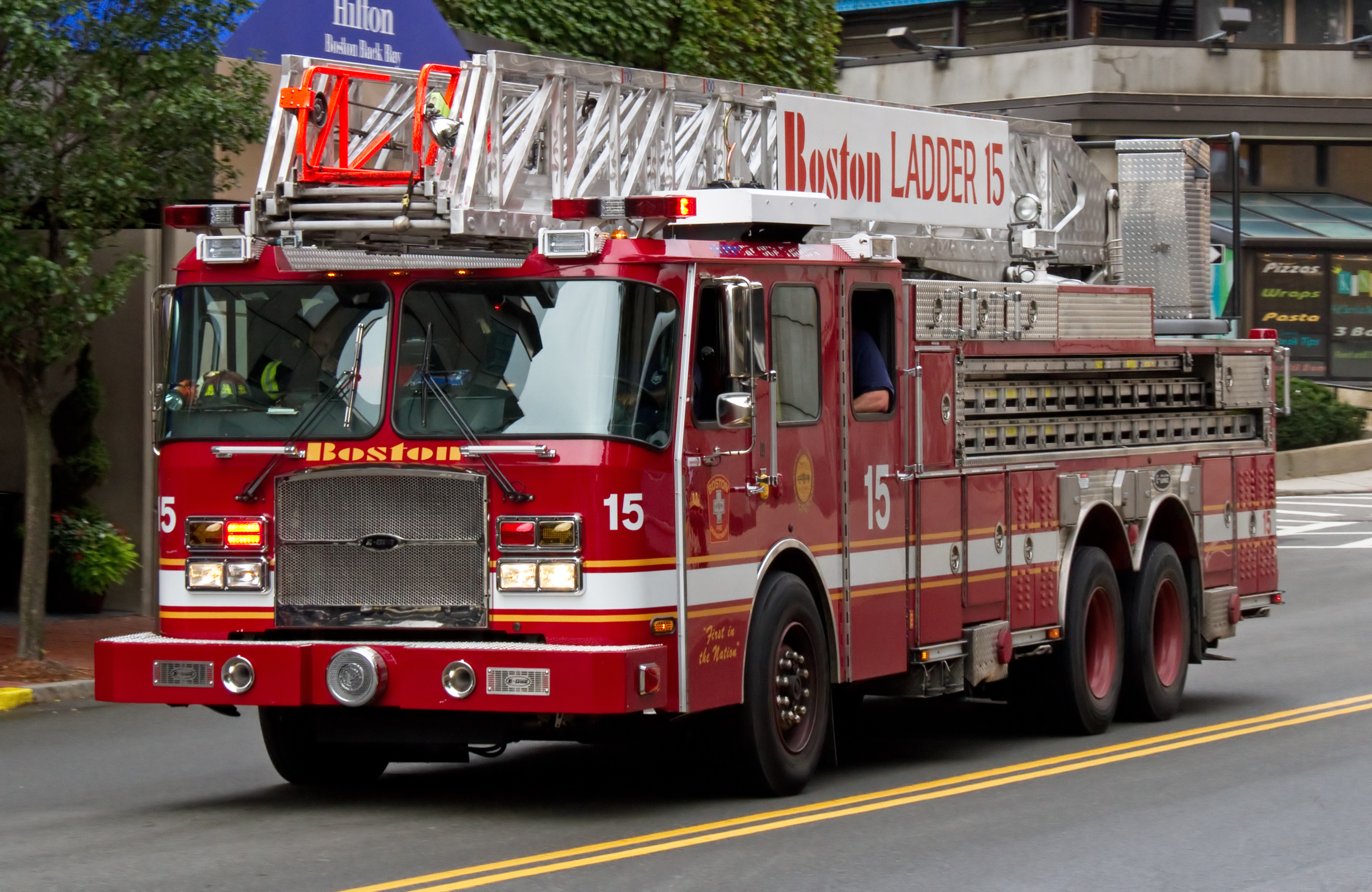
Ladder Company 15, quartered in the Back Bay

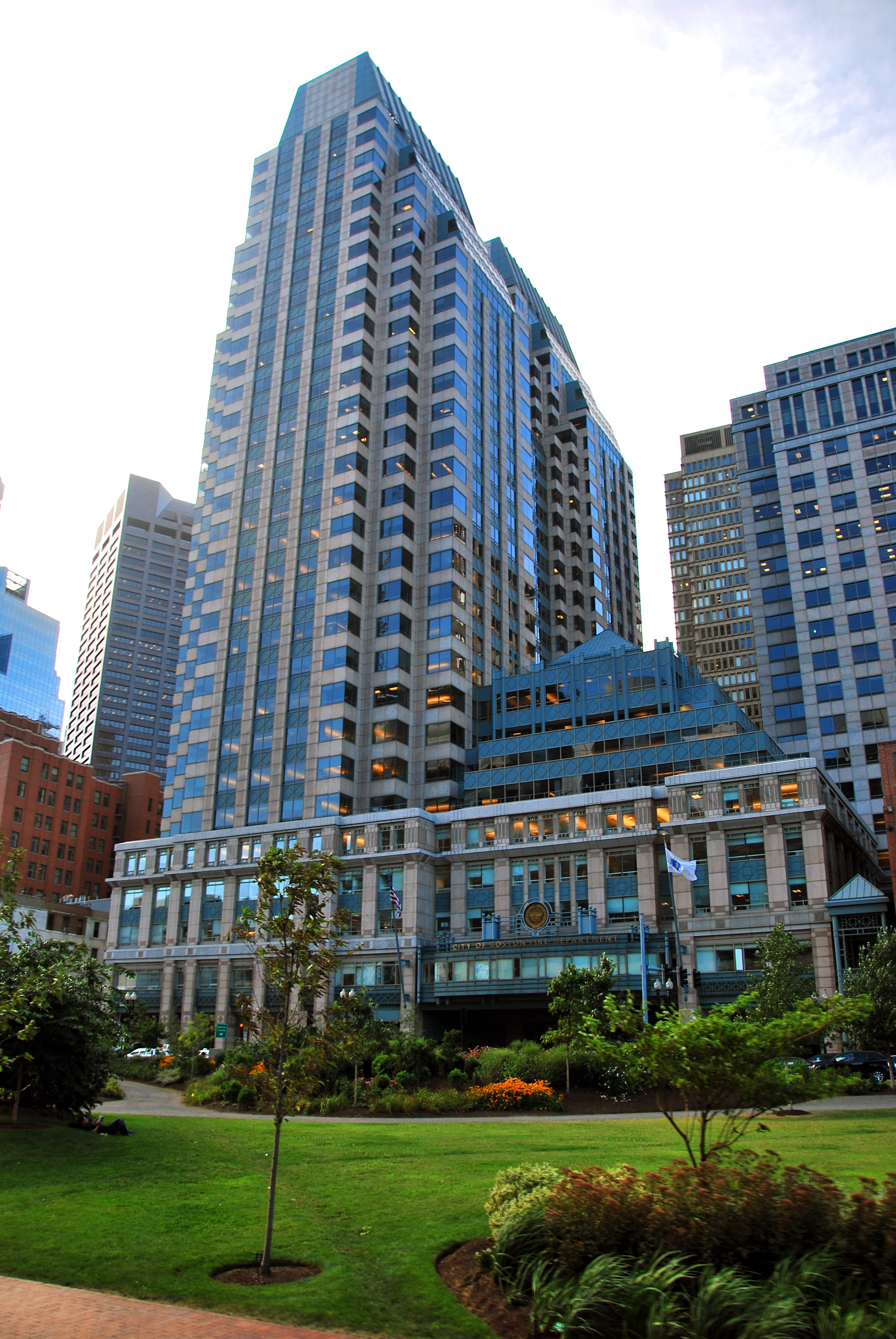
Quarters of Engine 10, Tower Ladder 3, Rescue 1, and C6 (Division 1 Chief), Downtown.

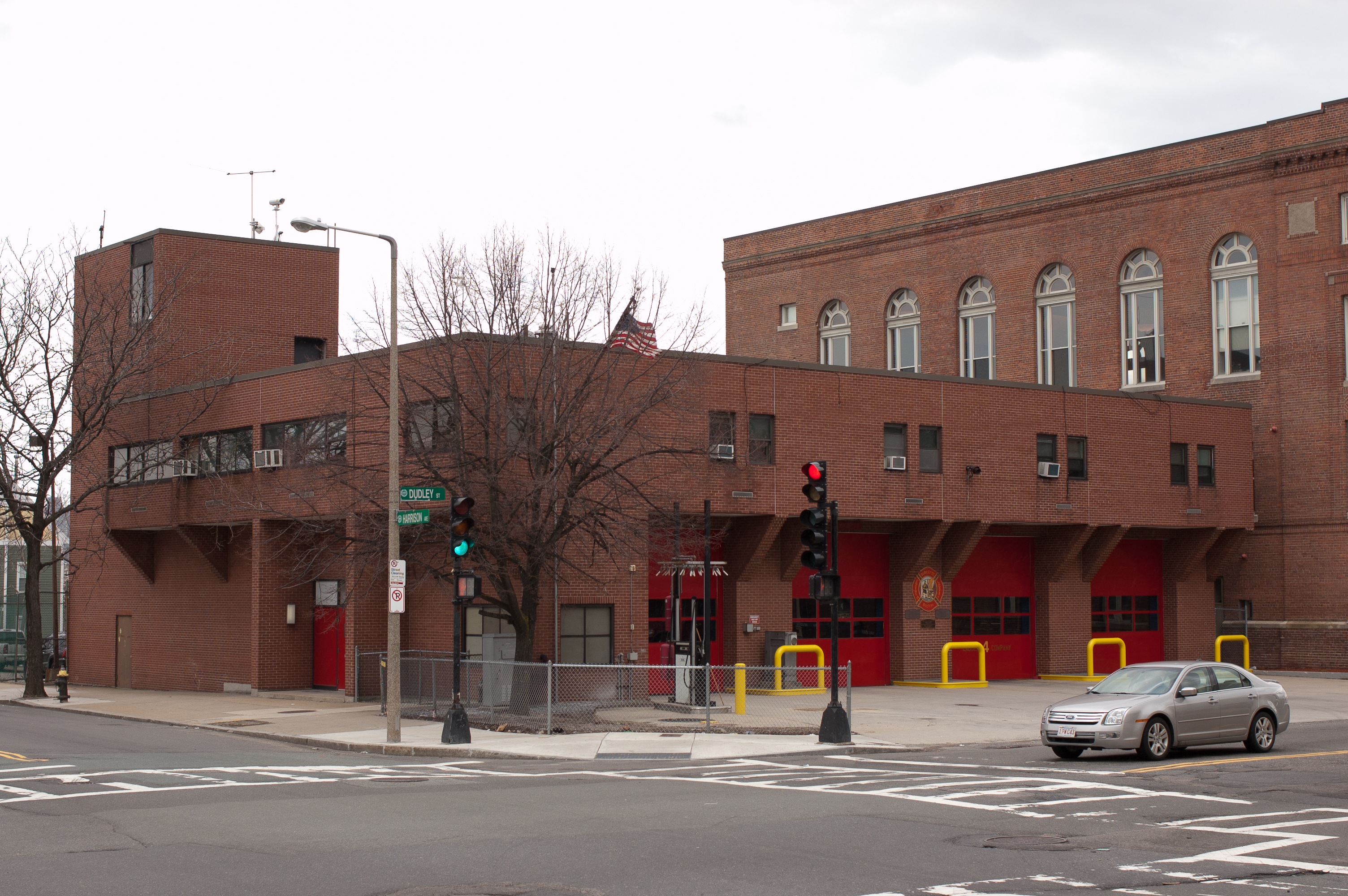
Quarters of Engine 14, Ladder 4, and H-1 (Safety Chief) in Roxbury.

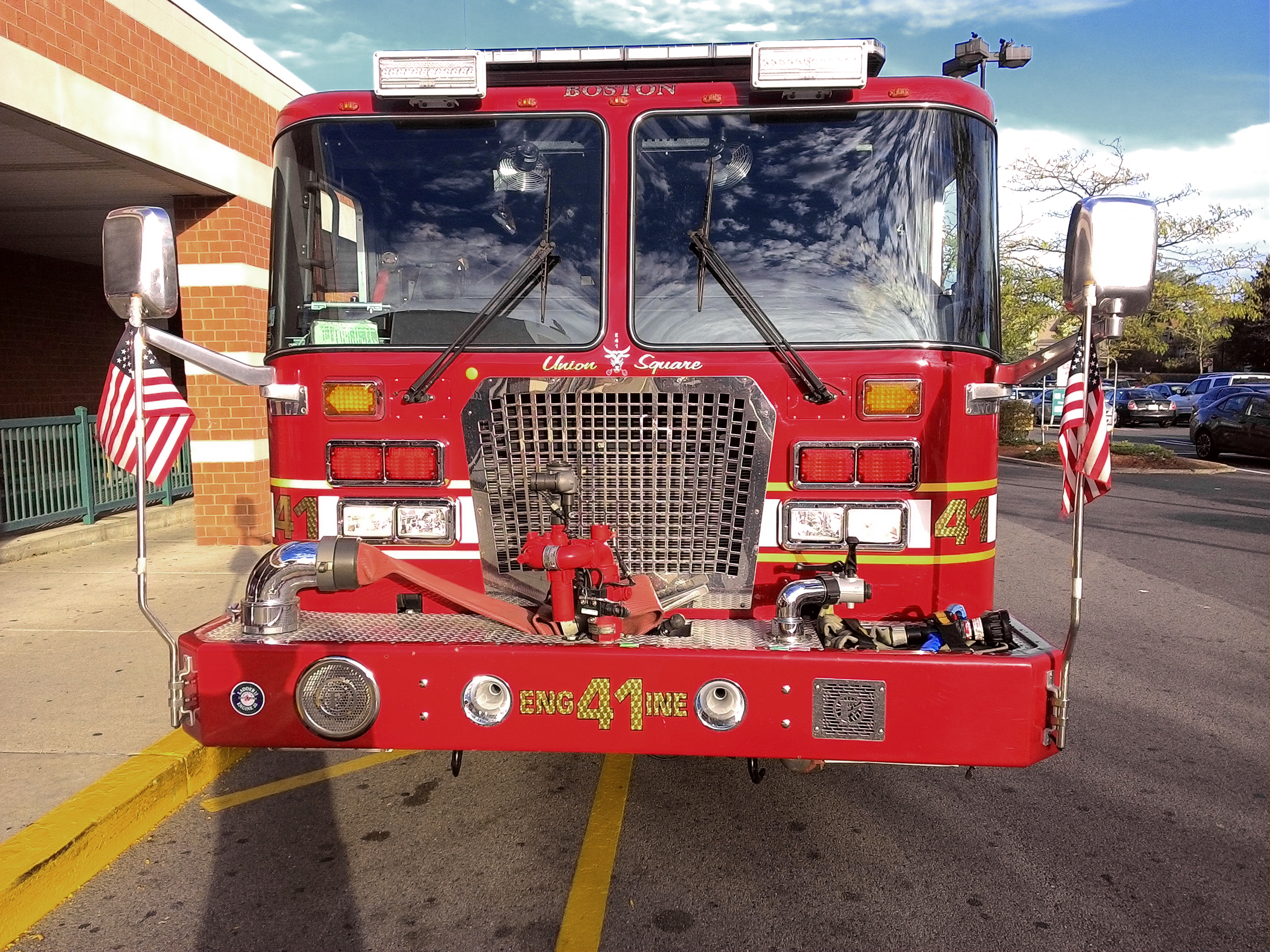
Engine Company 41 Boston Fire Department in Allston neighborhood (2015)

The Boston Fire Department operates two Divisions and is split into ten Districts total. Division 1 is responsible for the northern part of Boston and is split into five districts (Districts 1, 3, 4, 6 and 11) while Division 2 commands the southern five districts (Districts 7, 8, 9, 10 and 12). Each Division is commanded by a Deputy Chief and each District is commanded by a District Chief, similar to a Battalion chief, who supervises 3–5 or more firehouses and their respective fire companies and units. There is also a Safety Chief, who serves citywide as the Incident Safety Officer at fires and large-scale incidents.

The Marine Unit of the BFD is located at Burrough's Wharf in the North End and houses the three Fireboats or Marine Units. The Marine Unit responds to approximately 500−600 emergency calls annually. The Boston Fire Department also operates a High-Pressure Pumping Station at 175 Kneeland St. in Downtown and contains 17 miles (27 km) of underground piping throughout the Downtown area. The system can provide pressurized water to the many pressurized fire hydrants in the Downtown area.

In addition to the firehouses, the BFD also operates a Special Operations Command/Haz-Mat. facility at 155 Rivermoor St. in West Roxbury, a Communications/Fire Alarm Dispatch Center at 1 Fenway in Roxbury, and an Administrative Headquarters/Motor Pool Facility at 115 Southampton St. in Roxbury. The Fire Academy is located on Moon Island.

Boston Fire Department firehouses and apparatus
| Engine company | Ladder company | Special units | Chief units | Address | Neighborhood | District | Division |
|---|---|---|---|---|---|---|---|
| Engine 2 | Ladder 19 | | | 700 E. Fourth St. | South Boston: Telegraph Hill | 6 | 1 |
| Engine 3 | | Special / Lighting Unit | | 618 Harrison Ave. | South End | 4 | 1 |
| Engine 4 | Ladder 24 | | Car 3 (District 3 Chief Unit) | 200 Cambridge St. | West End | 3 | 1 |
| Engine 5 | | | Car 1 (District 1 Chief Unit) | 360 Saratoga St. | East Boston | 1 | 1 |
| Engine 7 | Ladder 17 | | Car 4 (District 4 Chief Unit) | 200 Columbus Ave. | Back Bay | 4 | 1 |
| Engine 8 | Ladder 1 | | | 392 Hanover St. | North End | 3 | 1 |
| Engine 9 | Ladder 2 | | | 239 Sumner St. | East Boston: Maverick Square | 1 | 1 |
| Engine 10 | Tower Ladder 3 | Rescue 1, Technical Support Unit 1, Collapse Unit | C-6 (Division 1 Deputy Chief Unit) | 125 Purchase St. | Downtown | 6 | 1 |
| Engine 14 | Ladder 4 | | H-1 (Safety Chief Unit) | 174 Dudley St. | Roxbury: Nubian Square | 7 | 2 |
| Engine 16 | | | Car 8 (District 8 Chief) | 9 Gallivan Blvd. | Dorchester | 8 | 2 |
| Engine 17 | Ladder 7 | | Car 7 (District 7 Chief Unit) | 44 Winter St. | Dorchester: Meeting House Hill | 7 | 2 |
| Engine 18 | Ladder 6 | | | 1884 Dorchester Ave. | Dorchester: Ashmont | 8 | 2 |
| Engine 20 | | Dive Unit | | 301 Neponset Ave. | Dorchester: Neponset | 8 | 2 |
| Engine 21 | | | | 641 Columbia Rd. | Dorchester: Uphams Corner | 7 | 2 |
| Engine 22 | | Haz-Mat. Unit, Rehab. Unit | | 700 Tremont St. | South End | 4 | 1 |
| Engine 24 | Ladder 23 | | | 36 Washington St. | Roxbury: Grove Hall | 7 | 2 |
| Engine 28 | Tower Ladder 10 | Technical Support Unit 2 | Car 9 (District 9 Chief Unit) | 746 Centre St. | Jamaica Plain | 9 | 2 |
| Engine 29 | Ladder 11 | | Car 11 (District 11 Chief Unit) | 138 Chestnut Hill Ave. | Brighton | 11 | 1 |
| Engine 30 | Ladder 25 | | | 1940 Centre St. | West Roxbury | 10 | 2 |
| Engine 32 | Ladder 9 | | | 525 Main St. | Charlestown | 3 | 1 |
| Engine 33 | Ladder 15 | | | 941 Boylston St. | Back Bay | 4 | 1 |
| Engine 37 | Ladder 26 | | | 560 Huntington Ave. | Fenway / Roxbury | 9 | 2 |
| Engine 39 | Ladder 18 | Decon. Unit 1 | Car 6 (District 6 Chief) | 272 D St. | South Boston | 6 | 1 |
| Engine 41 | Ladder 14 | | | 460 Cambridge St. | Allston | 11 | 1 |
| Engine 42 | | Rescue 2 | C-7 (Division 2 Deputy Chief Unit) | 1870 Columbus Ave | Roxbury: Egleston Square | 9 | 2 |
| Engine 48 | Ladder 28 | Brush Unit 48 | | 60 Fairmount Ave. | Hyde Park: Cleary Square | 12 | 2 |
| Engine 49 | | | | 209 Neponset Valley Pkwy. | Hyde Park: Readville | 10 | 2 |
| Engine 50 | | | | 34 Winthrop St. | Charlestown: Bunker Hill | 3 | 1 |
| Engine 51 | | | | 425 Faneuil St. | Brighton | 11 | 1 |
| Engine 52 | Ladder 29 | | | 975 Blue Hill Ave. | Dorchester | 12 | 2 |
| Engine 53 | Ladder 16 | | Car 12 (District 12 Chief Unit) | 945 Canterbury St. | Roslindale | 12 | 2 |
| Engine 55 | | Brush Unit 55 | Car 10 (District 10 Chief Unit) | 5115 Washington St. | West Roxbury | 10 | 2 |
| Engine 56 | Ladder 21 | | | 1 Ashley St. | East Boston: Orient Heights | 1 | 1 |
| | | MV John S. Damrell, Marine Unit 1, Marine Unit 2, Marine Unit 3 | | Burrough's Wharf | North End | 3 | 1 |

Note:Car 1 is the District 1 chief Unit,Car 3 is the District 3 Chief Unit,etc.

=== Radio call signs ===
Each division within the Boston Fire Department utilizes a series of alphabetical radio call signs to designate each unit within a certain division.

| Call Sign | Division |
|---|---|
| A | Associated Organizations |
| B | M.O.E.P. |
| C | Administrative Officers/Headquarters Staff |
| G | Emergency Planning and Preparedness Division |
| H | Special Operations Units |
| I | Information Technology Division |
| J | SCUBA Team |
| K | Fire Prevention/Investigation Division |
| M | Maintenance Section/Motor Pool |
| N | Field Services Unit |
| P | Boston Police Department Unit's |
| S | Fire Alarm |
| T | Special Operations Command |
| W | Training |
| X | Emergency Medical Response Division |

== Notable fires ==
=== Great Fire of 1760 ===
The first "Great Fire" of Boston destroyed 349 buildings on March 20, 1760.

=== Great Fire of 1872 ===
The second "Great Fire" of Boston began on November 9, 1872. The fire destroyed 776 buildings, killed 13 people, and caused $75,000,000 in property damage. The fire required mutual aid companies from as far away as New Haven, Connecticut, and Manchester, New Hampshire.

=== Arcadia Hotel fire ===
The Arcadia Hotel fire occurred on December 3, 1913, in a flophouse on the corner of Washington and Laconia Streets in Boston's South End. The fire killed 28 people, making it the deadliest in Boston at that time, passing the Great Boston Fire of 1872.

=== Cocoanut Grove Fire ===
The Cocoanut Grove fire was the second-deadliest single-building fire in American history. At 10:15 pm on November 28, 1942, the fire began when a short in the electrical wiring ignited gas leaking from a faulty refrigeration unit. The fire eventually claimed 490 lives, and injured 166 more. Only the 1903 Iroquois Theatre fire in Chicago had a higher death toll at 605.

=== Paramount Hotel fire ===
On January 28, 1966, a series of explosions under the Paramount Hotel and resulting fires killed 11 people and damaged multiple buildings. Boston Municipal Court Judge Elijah Adlow blamed the blast on a leak from a gas main.

=== Vendome Hotel Fire ===
At 2:35 pm on Saturday, June 17, 1972, an alarm from Box 1571 was received for the Hotel Vendome on Commonwealth Avenue in the Back Bay. It took nearly three hours to get the 4-alarm blaze under control. At 5:28 pm, during overhaul operations, the southeast section of the building unexpectedly collapsed. The collapse killed 9 Boston firefighters: Lieutenant Thomas J. Carroll (Engine 32), Lieutenant John E. Hanbury (Ladder 13), Firefighter Richard B. Magee (Engine 33), Firefighter Joseph F. Boucher (Engine 22), Firefighter Paul J. Murphy (Engine 32), Firefighter John E. Jameson (Engine 22), Firefighter Charles E. Dolan (Ladder 13), Firefighter Joseph P. Saniuk (Ladder 13) and Firefighter Thomas W. Beckwith (Engine 32); and injured eight more. This fire was the worst tragedy in the history of the Boston Fire Department and one of the most deadly fires in the history of U.S. firefighting.

=== Beacon Street Fire ===
On the afternoon of March 26, 2014, firefighters responded to a report of a fire in a Beacon Street brownstone in Boston's Back Bay. It was reported that smoke was observed upon arrival. Shortly after crews entered the building, a mayday alarm was sounded as members of Engine 33 became trapped in the basement. Two firefighters, Lieutenant Edward Walsh of Engine Company 33 and Michael Kennedy of Ladder Company 15, were killed and 18 people were injured in this nine alarm fire.

== See also ==
- Boston Society of Vulcans
- Boston Police Department

Listed on the National Register of Historic Places

- Congress Street Fire Station, now known as the Boston Fire Museum
- Engine House No. 34, in the Brighton neighborhood
- Harvard Avenue Fire Station, in the Allston neighborhood
