= John F. Cotter =

American political figure (c. 1906-1954)

Commissioner of the Boston Fire Department
- In office June 1, 1953 – January 22, 1954
- Preceded by: Michael T. Kelleher
- Succeeded by: Francis X. Cotter

Personal details
- Born: c. 1906 Charlestown, Boston, Massachusetts, USA
- Died: January 22, 1954 (aged 47) Boston, Massachusetts, USA
- Party: Democratic Party
- Education: Burdett College
- Military career
- Allegiance: United States of America
- Branch: Army Service Forces
- Unit: 1st Service Command

John F. Cotter (c. 1906, Boston–January 22, 1954, Boston) was an American political figure who served as Commissioner of the Boston Fire Department and secretary to Congressman John P. Higgins.

== Early life ==
Cotter was born in Charlestown. His parents were both Irish immigrants who came to Boston as children. His father was born in County Kerry and his mother was born in County Limerick. He took courses at Burdett College after graduating from Charlestown High School and went into the advertising and public relations business.

== Politics ==
In 1934, Cotter became secretary to Congressman John P. Higgins. Higgins resigned in 1937 to become chief justice of the Massachusetts Superior Court and Cotter ran to succeed him. During the campaign, Cotter was criticized by opponent Joseph A. Langone Jr. for using Higgins' franking privileges to mail 40,000 letters on United States House of Representatives stationery in which Cotter stated that Higgins' office would remain open and referred to himself as "acting Congressman". Cotter defended himself, stating that a new law allowed a Congressional office to remain open following a Congressman's resignation for six months or until a successor is chosen, and that the letter would not be an issue if he was not candidate. Cotter lost the Democratic nomination to Thomas A. Flaherty by 2,733 votes. Cotter easily won the Republican nomination, however this meant little in the overwhelmingly Democratic 11th district. Flaherty defeated Cotter in the special election by a 2 to 1 margin. Cotter again sought the 11th district seat in 1940 and 1946, but finished a distant third in the Democratic primary both times.

In 1943, Cotter returned to Washington as principal secretary to Flaherty's successor, James Michael Curley. During World War II he served in the Boston headquarters of the Army Service Forces's 1st Service Command, where he worked in public relations and provided entertainment to Army installations in New England.

After the War, Cotter served as an assistant to Suffolk County Register of Deeds Leo J. Sullivan and was president and treasurer of the John F. Cotter Company, which specialized in advertising and sales promotion. He was Curley's campaign manager in the 1945 Boston mayoral election and worked on publicity and organization for the Democratic Party during the 1948 Massachusetts election. That year, the Democrats won all of the state's constitutional offices as well as a majority in the Massachusetts House of Representatives and a 50/50 split in the Massachusetts Senate.

On June 1, 1953, Cotter was appointed commissioner of the Boston Fire Department by Mayor John Hynes. On January 22, 1954, he died at Massachusetts General Hospital following brain surgery. He was 47 years old.

Fire appointments
Preceded by Michael T. Kelleher	Commissioner of the Boston Fire Department; June 1, 1953–January 22, 1954	Succeeded by Francis X. Cotter
