= Florence Hagins =

Boston housing activist (1947–2015)

- Born: 1947; Roxbury, Massachusetts
- Died: March 21, 2015 (aged 67); Jacksonville, Florida

Florence Hagins (1947–2015) was a community activist for low-income home buyers from Dorchester, MA and the first homeowner to buy a home with the SoftSecond Loan Program in 1991. She was the assistant director for the Massachusetts Affordable Homeownership Alliance (MAHA) and worked to combat discriminatory bank lending practices, such as negotiating Community Reinvestment Act agreements with banks for over $1.5 billion in mortgage lending.

== Early life and career ==
Hagins was born in Roxbury in 1948 and graduated from Jamaica Plain High School. She worked as an office manager in a surgical ward and was in the health care industry for 23 years.

== Advocacy for homeownership ==
In 1991, Hagins attended an information session about a new mortgage program called the SoftSecond Loan Program (now known as ONE Mortgage) which was created by the Massachusetts Affordable Housing Alliance (MAHA), Commonwealth of Massachusetts, the City of Boston, the Massachusetts Bankers association, the Department of Housing and Community Development (DHCD) and the Massachusetts Housing Partnership Fund (MHP) to provide a 30-year fixed rate loan with a 3% down-payment for low- and moderate-income first-time homebuyers. Hagins was previous denied by a private mortgage insurer, despite a solid credit history and steady job.

She became the first person to be approved by the SoftSecond Loan Program and closed on her new home in January 1991.

A few months later, she started volunteering with Massachusetts Affordable Housing Alliance and their classes for first-time homebuyers. She joined the staff five years later and eventually became the assistant director. During her tenure, she counseled thousands of first-time homebuyers and created the post-purchasing counseling program called HomeSafe.

"I say that (SoftSecond changed my life) because it not only allowed me to provide a stable home," said Hagins. "It gave me the opportunity to spend many years working with an unbelievable group of women who wouldn't stop fighting for their community."

On Tuesday, December 14, 2004, Hagins testified before the U.S. House of Representatives Committee on Financial Services to hold banks such as Bank of America and Sovereign Bank accountable for their commitments to their SoftSecond agreements after seeing mixed results. She also advocated for the hiring of more loan originators from diverse backgrounds and increased presence in low and moderate-income neighborhoods.

Hagins retired from MAHA in 2005 and died on March 21, 2015.

== Legacy ==
Instead of a funeral or memorial service, MAHA held a fundraiser in Hagins' name as one of her last wishes so the program could reach even more homebuyers.

The Massachusetts Affordable Housing Alliance's headquarters on Dorchester Ave. is called the Sheridan-Hagins Homeownership Center in her honor.

In 2023, Hagins was recognized as one of "Boston's most admired, beloved, and successful Black Women leaders" by the Black Women Lead project.
