= Samuel D. Parker (soldier) =

American militia officer

- Born: September 9, 1868; Milton, Massachusetts, United States
- Died: October 22, 1953 (aged 85); Boston
- Military career
- Allegiance: United States of America
- Branch: Massachusetts Volunteer Militia (1889–1911); State Guard of Massachusetts (1917–1920)
- Rank: Brigadier General

Samuel Dunn Parker (September 9, 1868 – October 22, 1953) was an American militia officer in the Massachusetts Volunteer Militia and the State Guard of Massachusetts. He was inspector general of the Massachusetts Volunteer Militia and commander of the State Guard regiments deployed during the Boston Police Strike. He also served as commissioner of the Boston Fire Department.

== Early life ==
Parker was born on September 9, 1868, in Milton, Massachusetts, United States. He was the scion of a wealthy family of Massachusetts textile industrialists; his father, Charles Henry Parker, was treasurer of the Suffolk Savings Bank and a one-time member of the Boston Common Council. He attended public school in Milton and graduated from Harvard College in 1891. At Harvard, Parker was a member of the varsity rowing crew.

== Military career ==
=== Massachusetts Volunteer Militia ===
Parker joined the state militia in on December 3, 1889, as a member of the 1st corps of cadets. In 1895 he was made a sergeant of Battery A. Two years later he was promoted to lieutenant and on July 18, 1898, was made captain of the battery. In 1906, Governor Curtis Guild Jr. appointed Parker assistant inspector general with the rank of lieutenant colonel. In 1908 he was promoted to inspector general with the rank of brigadier general. He retired from the militia on December 27, 1911.

=== State Guard of Massachusetts ===
On April 5, 1917, the Massachusetts General Court created the State Guard of Massachusetts after the Massachusetts National Guard was mustered into federal service. The organization was to serve as a home guard during World War I. On April 18, 1917, Governor Samuel W. McCall appointed Parker to the State Guard Board, which was tasked with organizing the new Guard. Once the guard was formed, Parker was placed in command of the Guard's 4th brigade.

During the 1919 Boston Police Strike, Parker was placed in command of the six State Guard regiments called out to police the city. Parker order the cavalry to establish dead lines in areas where crowds were collecting and to keep people moving while using as little violence as possible. The guard went on duty on September 10, 1919, with 5,000 soldiers patrolling the streets. That night two men were killed when guardsmen opened fire on an unruly crowd in South Boston. Another was killed during a riot in Scollay Square. Another man was shot and killed by the guardsmen the following day during the arrest of 44 men who were shooting craps. The guard was relieved from duty on December 21, 1919, after the Boston Police Department had recruited enough new members to begin policing the city again.

The State Guard was disbanded in 1920.

== Fire commissioner ==
On January 30, 1908, Mayor George A. Hibbard removed fire commissioner Benjamin W. Wells from office and named Parker to replace him. Parker was allowed to remain as inspector general of the militia while serving as fire commissioner. On May 26, 1910, Parker sent in his resignation to Mayor John F. Fitzgerald. It was accepted the following day and Francis M. Carroll of the bath department was named acting commissioner.

== Professional career ==
Parker worked as a real estate broker, was treasurer of the Ipswich Mills and New England Home for Little Wanderers, vice president of the Suffolk Savings Bank, president of the Home for Aged Women, and a director of the Merchants National Bank.

Parker died on October 22, 1953, at his home in Boston.

== Works cited ==
- Russell, Francis (2005). A City in Terror: Calvin Coolidge and the 1919 Boston Police Strike (reprint ed.). Beacon Press. ISBN 9780807050330.

Military offices
Preceded by Brig. Gen. William H. Brigham	Inspector General of the Massachusetts Volunteer Militia; January 1, 1908–December 27, 1911	Succeeded by Col James H. Smyth
Fire appointments
Preceded by Benjamin W. Wells	Boston Fire Commissioner; January 31, 1908–May 27, 1910	Succeeded by Charles Dudley Daly
