= Henry S. Russell =

American military and government official (1838-1905)

Henry Sturgis Russell
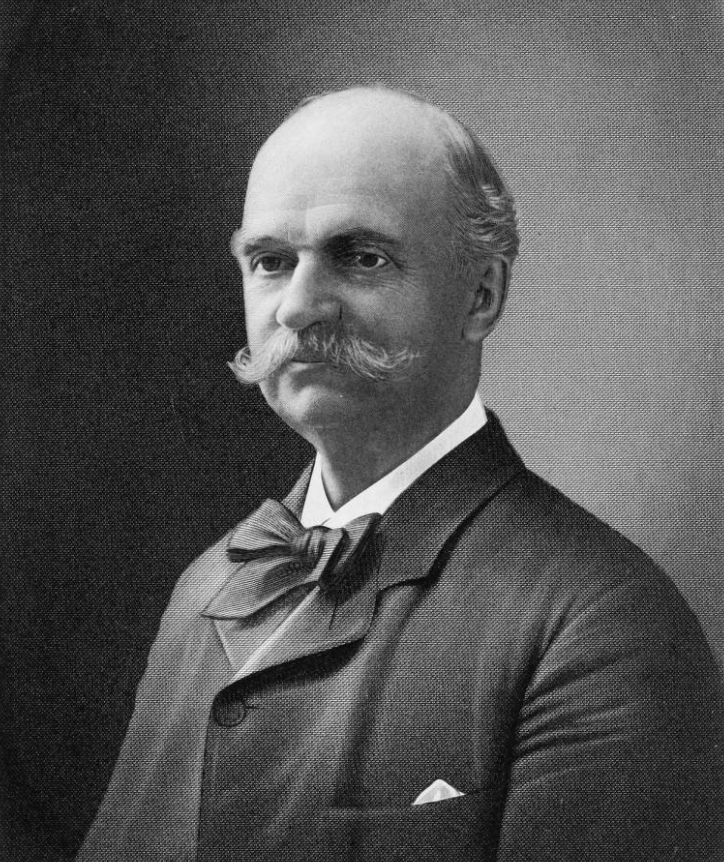
- Born: June 21, 1838; Dorchester, Massachusetts
- Died: February 16, 1905 (aged 66); Boston, Massachusetts
- Burial place: Milton Cemetery
- Education: Harvard University
- Occupations: Military officer, government official

Signature
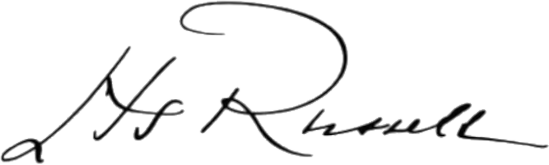

Henry Sturgis Russell (June 21, 1838 – February 16, 1905) was an American military and government official who served as commander of the 5th Regiment Massachusetts Colored Volunteer Cavalry and as the first commissioner of the Boston Fire Department.

== Early life ==
Russell was born on June 21, 1838, in the Savin Hill section of Dorchester, Massachusetts to George R. and Sarah Parkinson (Shaw) Russell. His grandfather was ambassador Jonathan Russell and his first cousin was Robert Gould Shaw. Russell graduated from Harvard University in 1860.

== Military career ==
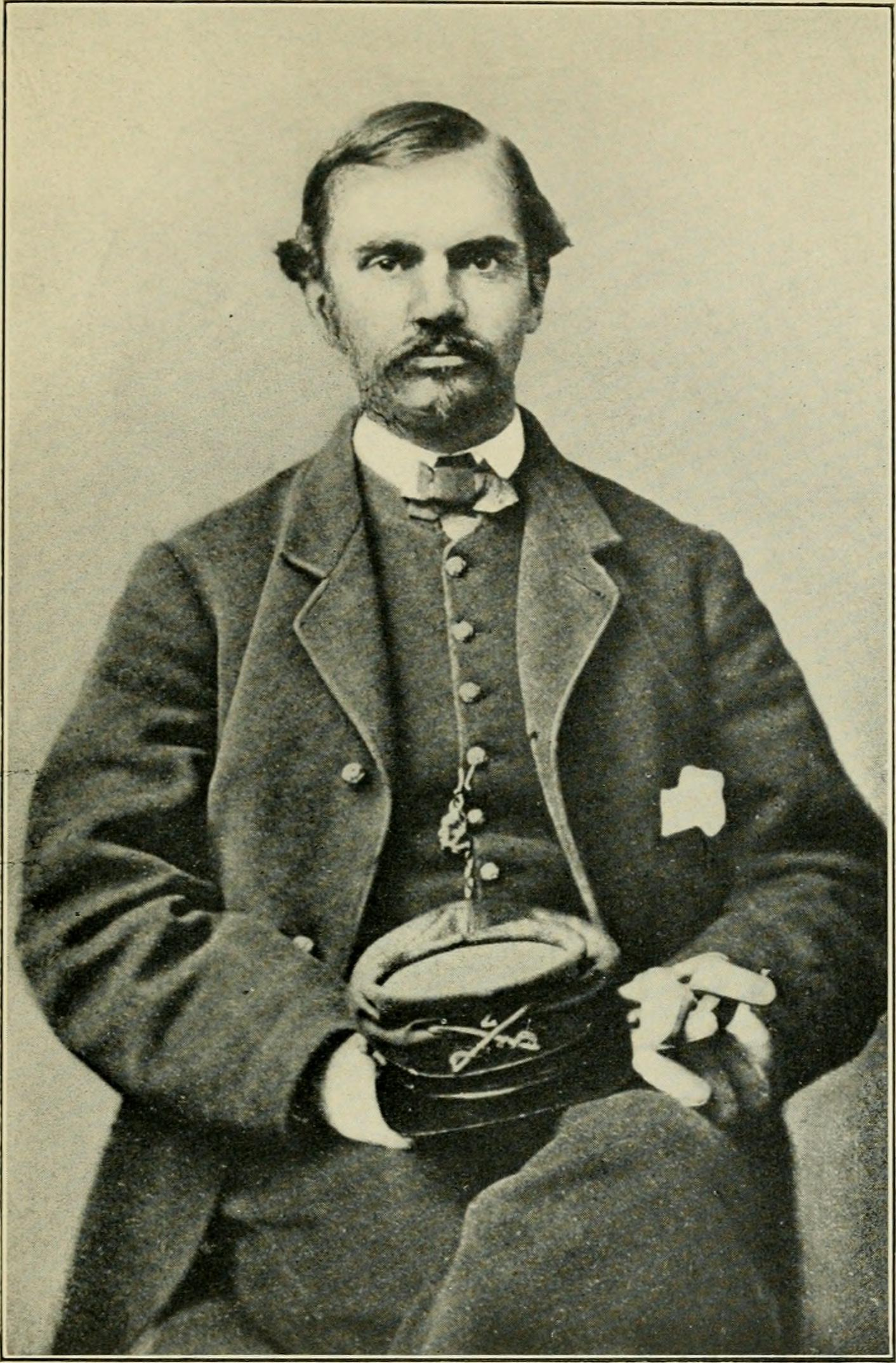

Russell entered the Union Army on May 11, 1861, as a lieutenant in the 2nd Massachusetts Cavalry. He was promoted to captain on December 13, 1861. He was captured at the Battle of Cedar Mountain (August 9, 1862) and sent to Libby Prison. He was released in a prisoner exchange and returned to duty on November 15, 1862. On January 22, 1863, he was promoted to lieutenant colonel. On April 5, 1864, he was made a colonel of the 5th Regiment Massachusetts Colored Volunteer Cavalry. When the regiment reached Washington D.C., Russell was briefly assigned command of a brigade at Camp Casey. On May 13 he was ordered to join General Edward Winslow Hincks' division in City Point, Virginia. On June 15, Russell was wounded in the Siege of Petersburg. He rejoined his regiment on September 30 at Point Lookout, Maryland, where his regiment was guarding Confederate prisoners of war. He resigned his command on February 15, 1865, and was brevetted brigadier general on March 13, 1865.

== Business career and family ==
After the war, Russell joined J.M. Forbes & Co., where he sold goods from China and East India. In 1863 he married Mary Hathaway, the daughter of John Murray Forbes. The couple had five children.

== Government appointments ==
In 1878, control of the Boston Police Department was transferred from the board of alderman to an independent police commission. Mayor Henry L. Pierce appointed Russell to chair the new board. Russell was credited with creating the harbor police, reorganizing the force on a semi-military basis (the first reorganization of the department since its founding in 1854), proposing new rules for conduct and definitions of duties, arranging for merit-based promotions, and instituting physical examinations for officers under the rank of captain. He left the board in 1880.

In January 1895, he was appointed by Mayor Edwin Upton Curtis to succeed John R. Murphy on the Boston Fire commission. That July, Russell became the first solo commissioner in the department's history. During his tenure as commissioner, Russell hired and promoted based on merit rather than political considerations and worked to improve living conditions in the city's firehouses. He remained commissioner until his death on February 16, 1905. He was buried at Milton Cemetery.

In 1909, a drinking fountain in memory of Russell was erected in Milton, Massachusetts, where he had been a summer resident for many years.

Fire appointments
Preceded by Position created	Commissioner of the Boston Fire Department; 1895–1905	Succeeded by Benjamin W. Wells
