= Mary Edna Hill Gray Dow =

American journalist

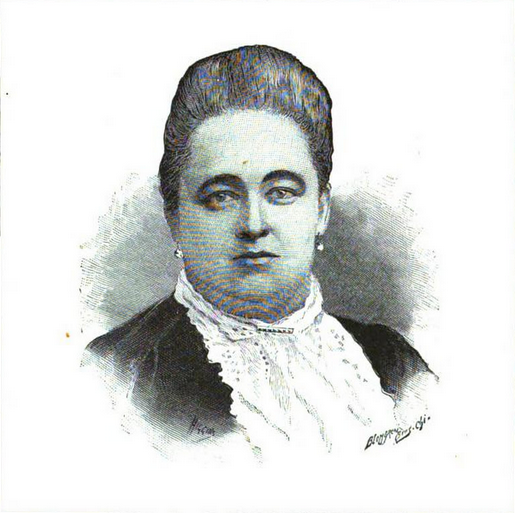
- Born: Mary Edna Hill; December 15, 1848; Dover, New Hampshire, U.S.
- Died: August 24, 1914 (aged 65); Dover, New Hampshire, U.S.
- Other names: Mary E. H. G. Dow
- Education: Charlestown High School, Boston, Massachusetts
- Occupation(s): Educator, journalist, financier
- Known for: Serving as president of the Dover Horse Railway
- Spouse(s): George Frederick Gray (m. 1875; died 1880) Henry Dow (m. 1885; died 1889)
- Children: 3

Mary Edna Hill Gray Dow (also known as Mary E. H. G. Dow; December 15, 1848 – August 24, 1914) was an American financier, school principal, and correspondent.

Dow was president of the Dover, New Hampshire, horsecar railroad, and believed to be the first woman in the world to hold such a position. She held the controlling stock of the road, which she bought up when she found that a syndicate of Boston men was trying to buy it. Prior to this position, she was a teacher of French and German in a seminary, and a journalist. She also made considerable money through real estate transactions.

== Early years and education ==
Mary Edna Hill was born in Dover, New Hampshire, on December 15, 1848, a daughter of Nathaniel Rogers Hill. She was of Puritan ancestry.

Dow was educated partly in Dover. While she was yet a child, her parents removed to Boston, Massachusetts, and it was there she got the larger part of her schooling. At the age of 17, she graduated with high honors from Charlestown High School. She developed business experience on account of the invalidism of her father, who was a farmer.

== Career ==
For some years, Dow was a successful assistant principal of the Rochester, New Hampshire, high school, and afterwards went to St. Louis, Missouri, where for three years, she was instructor in French and German in a female academy. Dow also worked as a correspondent for several newspapers, among them The Boston Journal, Boston Traveller, New Hampshire Statesman, the Dover Enquirer, and some Southern papers. While in the West, she conceived a liking for the stage, because of her success in amateur theatricals, but the disapproval of friends caused her to abandon the idea.

In October 1875, she married a wealthy resident of Dover, George Frederick Gray, part owner and editor of the Dover Press, a Democratic weekly paper published there. They spent two years in Europe. Three children were born to them. During the marriage, she was entrusted with the care of what estate he possessed. He died in 1880.

Five years after the death of Mr. Gray, she married Dr. Henry Dow, a physician of Dover, and a gentleman owning considerable property. After spending some time in England, they returned to Dover where Mrs. Dow began to attract attention as a financier. Her business capacity came rather conspicuously into notice as Dr. Dow was very willing to have her take charge of his affairs.

In January 1888, Dow was elected president of the Dover Horse Railway, an event that brought attention in railway circles. She was familiar with the circumstances of the road and had secured a majority of its stock. The road had been a failing enterprise. The patrons found fault with the accommodations and the excessiveness of fares, and the stockholders were unhappy with the excessiveness of expenses and the small receipts. For years, the horse railway had paid only a small dividend. A Boston syndicate made overtures for possession of the whole stock, and with such success that the board of directors reached the point of voting to sell. Mrs. Dow was out of town during these negotiations, but returned as the sale was about to be consummated. She held a small amount of the stock, and was approached with an offer for it at something like one-third the price at which it had been bought. She at once decided that, if the stock were so low, and yet the Boston syndicate expected to make the road pay, any other able financier might reasonably indulge the same hope; that, if there were any profits to be obtained, they ought to be saved to Dover, and that she would try her own hand in the matter. Her attitude interrupted the syndicate's scheme, and for some weeks, there was a contest of wits to see who would get control of the most blocks. When the next meeting was called, it was supposed that the property would be transferred to the Boston party, but it transpired that Mrs. Dow acquired more than half the stock. Her election to the presidency was certain. As her own votes would elect the directorate, that body would be made up by those she chose. Several among the Dover gentlemen, who desired to be on the board, said that they would not vote for a woman for president as it was simply preposterous and meant bankruptcy. But the matter was presented to the gentlemen in this form: Agree to vote for Mrs. Dow, and you can hold office; otherwise you can not. They succumbed, but with chagrin and trepidation.

After her election to the presidency, her first moves as general manager were to double the insurance on the property, inaugurate a system of cash payments, thereby avoiding debts, and getting on all bills a discount of ten per cent. People who dealt with the road had not been accustomed to receive ready money from it, and the pleasant surprise caused them to make their discounts more liberal. She raised the wages of the employees, and reduced the fare from six cents to five cents. The reduction of fare pleased the public and augmented the receipts. Being a real judge of horses and material, she was able to save the road a considerable amount of expenditures. She also added to the receipts by using tickets with advertisements relating to a favorite brand of tobacco, and this little resort, although considered to be sharp business sense, was regarded as a poor choice for a woman. At the close of the year, under Mrs. Dow's administration, the affairs of the road showed an improved condition, and a dividend of 11 percent was declared. Later, she sold her interest at a profit.

== Personal life ==
Dow's first husband, George Frederick Gray, was born at Dover. He was survived by his widow and three children: George, an illustrator, with a studio in Boston; and Ruth and Charles, twins. Mr. Gray was prominent in politics in Strafford County, New Hampshire, and was once a member of the Massachusetts State Senate. He was widely known also in journalism and as editor of the Dover Gazette and as contributor to the Herald, was one of the pioneer and progressive newspaper men of the area.

Dow's second husband, Henry Dow was also born at Dover, on the site of the old Strafford bank. He always made his home in his native place, where he died in 1889, at the age of 89 years. After his studies at Harvard College, he subsequently was engaged in the study of medicine but when the time came for him to begin the practice of his profession, he discovered that his interests lay in a different direction. Therefore, he became a farmer and for many years, interested himself in the cultivation and improvement of his land lying in the vicinity of Bellamy, Strafford County. He was never an active politician but gave his continued support to the Republican Party.

Dow died at Dover at the age of 66 on August 24, 1914.
