= Michael T. Kelleher =

American insurance executive and government official (1897-1958)

Michael T. Kelleher (February 1, 1897 – September 29, 1958) was an American insurance executive and government official who served as Commissioner of the Boston Fire Department from 1950 to 1953.

== Early life ==
Kelleher was born in Cambridge, Massachusetts on February 1, 1897 to Michael and Mary (Kilderry) Kelleher. After graduating from Cambridge High and Latin School in 1915, he went to work in a sugar refinery, but left after a few years to enter the banking field. He worked for the Federal Trust Company (later incorporated as the Federal National Bank), where he rose to the position of assistant cashier. He also served in the military during World War I. On October 9, 1929 he married Mary Agnes Doyle, daughter of former state senator James H. Doyle. Washington Senators catcher Muddy Ruel served as Kelleher’s best man. Before the wedding, 1,800 people attended a bachelor party held for him at Institute Hall in East Cambridge, Massachusetts.

== Early government work ==
In 1932, Kelleher was appointed deputy state auditor by Francis X. Hurley. He left the auditor’s office in 1935 to become second deputy insurance commissioner. He resigned from the insurance department on April 15, 1938 to return to the private sector.

== Return to private sector ==
After leaving the state insurance department, Kelleher joined Marsh & McLennan Inc. In 1943 he was promoted to vice president. In 1946, he was elected to the board of directors of the Boston Mutual Life Insurance Company. In 1947, he was elected president of the Boston Chamber of Commerce. During his tenure as chamber president, Kelleher organized a campaign to assist wounded veterans and needy people in Scotland. The campaign resulted in the creation of the Yankee Friend Ship, which carried $1 million worth of goods to the people of Scotland.

== Boston Fire Commissioner ==
On December 14, 1949, mayor-elect John Hynes announced that Kelleher would serve as his fire commissioner. During his tenure as fire commissioner, Kelleher recalled fire badges held by citizens, planned a major fire prevention drive, ordered a study of the department’s gas masks following the deaths of two firemen from gas inhalation, and suspended 15 firemen who had been convicted of payroll fraud.

Kelleher suddenly resigned on February 21, 1951, stating that he was “tired of the fleabites of petty politicians”, referring to criticism levied at him by city councilor Michael H. Cantwell. Cantwell had criticized the number of aides and chauffeurs Kelleher had as well as accusing him of being lax in regards to civil defense. Hynes declined to accept Kelleher’s resignation and hoped that he would change his mind. On February 24, 1951, Kelleher, who had been on vacation in Palm Beach, Florida returned to Boston and was met at Logan Airport by a crowd of 200 firemen. Kelleher announced that he had reconsidered his resignation and that he was still fire commissioner. On November 18, 1952, Kelleher resigned again to avoid a $120 a week lifetime pension he would receive as a veteran. He remained on until his successor was appointed in May 1953.

== Death ==
On September 29, 1958, Kelleher attended the annual Alfred E. Smith Memorial Foundation Dinner at the Waldorf Astoria New York. While there, he suffered a heart attack and died in his sleep on September 30, 1958. He was 61 years old.

Fire appointments
Preceded by Russell S. Codman Jr.	Commissioner of the Boston Fire Department; 1950–1953	Succeeded by John F. Cotter
