= Darryl Williams (advocate) =

American advocate (1964–2010)

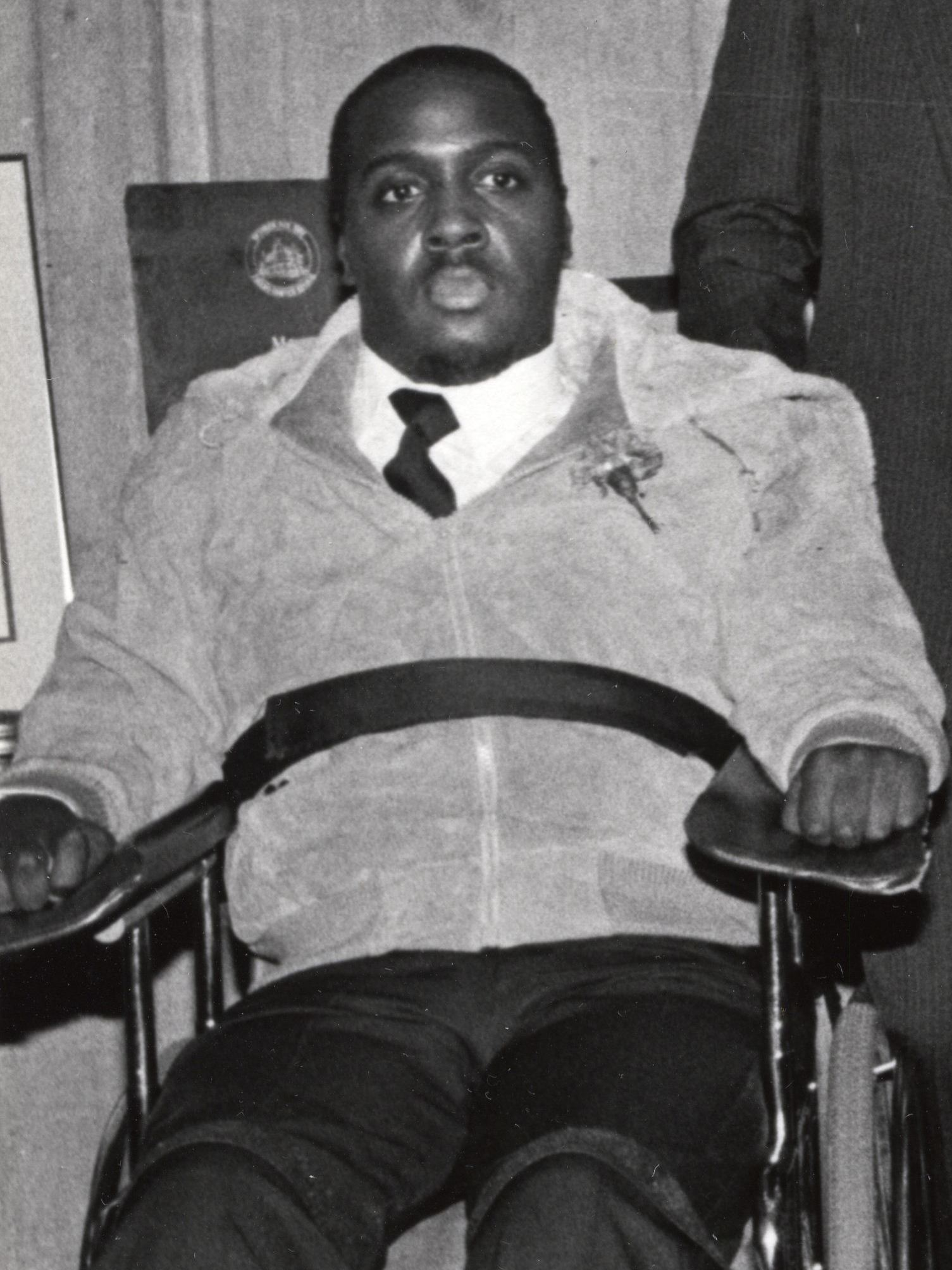
- Williams in 1985
- Born: Darryl K. Williams; January 28, 1964; Boston, Massachusetts, U.S.
- Died: March 28, 2010 (aged 46); Milton, Massachusetts, U.S.
- Education: Jamaica Plain High School; Northeastern University
- Occupation: Advocate

Darryl K. Williams (January 28, 1964 – March 28, 2010) of Roxbury, Boston, Massachusetts and Milton, Massachusetts, was an American advocate for social justice, compassion and forgiveness as well as a local advocate for accessibility for persons with disabilities. As a 15-year-old African-American high school student, Williams became the victim of a school shooting on September 28, 1979, in Boston, Massachusetts while playing American football. Williams survived the shooting, but was paralyzed from the neck down for the rest of his life.

Despite the misfortunes, Williams earned a high school diploma and a college degree. Over the course of three decades, he spoke to many thousands of Boston area high school students and others about gun violence, forgiveness and social justice in sports. He helped countless high school students and adults in and around Boston learn to accept people of all races. Along the way, Darryl was awarded full scholarships to attend college and many civic honors for his advocacy efforts.

== Early life ==
Williams was born in Boston on January 28, 1964. His family included his mother and one sister with whom he lived all his life. Growing up in the neighborhood of Roxbury within the city of Boston in Massachusetts, Williams attended services at Eliot Congregational Church which was walking distance from their home. As a teenager in the late 1970s, he attended Jamaica Plain High School. The high school was not his first choice, but because of court ordered school busing in effect at the time in Boston he was assigned there. As a sophomore, he played for the school's varsity football team. He liked playing guitar and dreamed of becoming a college and a professional football player one day.

== School shooting ==
On Friday, September 28, 1979, Darryl Williams was playing for the first time as a wide receiver on Jamaica Plain High School's (JP) football team. The JP team travelled to the neighborhood of Charlestown in Boston, Massachusetts to play against Charlestown High School. In the city of Boston, court ordered school busing was in effect since the fall of 1974, and the busing exacerbated already notable racial tensions. Charlestown in particular was considered inhospitable to African American teenagers such as Williams. The ethnic makeup of Charlestown High School at the time was mostly working class Irish and other Europeans whereas at Jamaica Plain High School the makeup was more diverse with many African Americans as well as European Americans. The respective football teams reflected this difference. Despite the differences and tensions, the teams met and began playing.

Late in the 2nd quarter, Williams caught his first pass ever in a high school varsity football game. His reception of a long pass to the 5 yard line led to a score for Jamaica Plain High School. The 2nd quarter ended soon afterward, and it was halftime. The team opted to stay outside on the field during halftime instead of going into the guest locker room. Williams and his team huddled together near the end zone, celebrated Williams' reception and their 6–0 lead. The football coach started giving a pep talk.

Meanwhile, across the street and 300 feet away, three Irish American teenage boys perched on the roof of an empty apartment building of a housing complex. One of the teenagers had recently found a loaded pistol and wanted to test it. He fired the gun once in the direction of the football field. The shooter later claimed to be aiming at pigeons, but one of the other boys disputed this.

The noise from the shot echoed against nearby buildings. The bullet went between Williams' shoulder pads and helmet and lodged in the back of his neck. Darryl fell to the ground unconscious in front of his teammates. Darryl's teammates, fearing more shooting, fell to the ground as well. One of the teammates noticed Darryl was unconscious and called out for help.

=== Aftermath ===
Emergency responders arrived immediately, started basic life support and put Williams into an ambulance. The ambulance took Williams to Boston City Hospital in the South End neighborhood of Boston for treatment even though Massachusetts General Hospital in the West End was much closer. When Williams awoke in the hospital, he was unable to feel anything below his neck. Over the course of a few months, he was able to breathe on his own, talk, and recover use of one of his shoulders. However, Williams remained paralyzed from the neck down for the rest of his life.

==== Responses ====
The mayor of Boston at the time, Kevin White, vowed to find the perpetrators and ordered the Boston Police Department to start a massive manhunt. After two days, police found and arrested the three teenagers. Darryl's mother, when interviewed at Boston City Hospital, asked Boston's citizens to remain calm and not start large demonstrations or riots.

On Monday, October 1, 1979, three days after the shooting, Pope John Paul II arrived in Boston for an historic pastoral visit. Outside the Cathedral of the Holy Cross in the South End neighborhood of Boston, about 1800 African Americans protested the Williams shooting as the pope arrived there on a rainy day. During the evening Mass on Boston Common held by the pope, Cardinal Medeiros of Boston and 400,000 other attendees, a special prayer was added to the service for Darryl's recovery.

Two days later, on October 3, a large rally of thousands of adults and high school students was held in front of City Hall in support of Williams. Several local and state politicians visited Darryl and his mother at Boston City Hospital during his recovery there and promised their support. Boston Public Schools was obligated to pay for Darryl's medical care since the injury occurred during a school event on school property. Boston's mayor Kevin White and other local, state and federal officials promised the Williams family additional financial help, but over the decades that help was limited to Medicare benefits, private donations and fundraisers.

Williams eventually recovered enough to start learning again, and he moved to a handicap accessible high school in Canton to continue his high school studies. In the meantime, a trust fund was started and several fundraisers were conducted by various groups. A citywide All Star football game was organized in Williams' honor in November 1979. In Jamaica Plain High School's 1981 yearbook, it is noted that a Darryl Williams week was commemorated at the school in Williams' honor. With the ongoing racial tensions and fears of more violence, the Charlestown High School football team did not play another home game for nine years.

The Freedom House of Roxbury, Massachusetts purchased a wheelchair accessible home in the nearby town of Milton, Massachusetts in the early 1980s and offered it to Williams and his family. Williams moved into the home with his family and lived there for the rest of his life.

The 3 teenage suspects were charged in the shooting and sent home after posting bail. The two older suspects including the shooter were tried as adults, convicted and sentenced to 10 years in prison. The youngest one was tried in juvenile court and acquitted. While in prison, the shooter told an interviewer that he was aiming at pigeons, not people. Williams and his family disputed the shooter's claim, and at one point the youngest told a reporter that they were not shooting at birds.

== Adult life ==
During a time of racial tensions, Darryl and his family opted not to use inflammatory rhetoric which could lead to more violence. Instead, he preached forgiveness whenever he could, and he advocated for peace and racial harmony. About the shooting, Williams said, "White people did not shoot me. Three white people shot me." Richard Lapchick, who also knew Nelson Mandela well, described Williams as "'America's lesser-known Nelson Mandela.' Like Mandela, he had every reason to hate white people. Instead, he loved all people."

=== Education and career ===
Williams attended the Massachusetts Hospital School (Pappas Rehabilitation School in Canton, Massachusetts) and earned a high school degree from Boston Public Schools. With the help of a President's Scholarship, he then earned a bachelor's degree from Northeastern University in Boston. Darryl was given a computer which responded to his verbal commands so that he could write. Joe Malone, the Massachusetts State Treasurer in the 1990s, gave Williams a job at the Massachusetts State Lottery where he worked as an operations manager then a computer programmer for many years.

=== Rights advocacy ===
Richard E. Lapchick, a former professor at Northeastern University in Boston, Massachusetts and a longtime friend of Darryl Williams, described Darryl in an ESPN.com article as an advocate for social justice, compassion and forgiveness in a city that faced racial tensions throughout his lifetime. Lapchick related to Williams as both Lapchick and Lapchick's father were the victims of sports related hate crimes. In 1984, Lapchick hired Williams as a motivational speaker. Williams spoke to thousands of high school students about compassion, understanding and forgiveness in the face of violence in schools and racial tensions in Boston.

He also advocated often for wheelchair accessibility in public places. He made friends with newspaper writers such as Dan Shaughnessy of the Boston Globe, Joe Fitzgerald of the Boston Herald and sports figures such as boxer Muhammad Ali. Ali called Darryl the "Second Greatest" after visiting him in 1991.

=== End of life ===
Williams died in his sleep at his home in Milton on March 28, 2010. Since then, several articles about Williams' life and accomplishments have been written by sports writers and several others. Richard Lapchick started a memorial fund in memory of Darryl Williams to help his family. In 2012, when Darryl's mother and sister were faced with foreclosure on their Milton home, Lapchick reopened the fund and the contributions from the Boston area to the fund was enough to pay off a quarter of the mortgage.

=== Literary works ===
Williams wrote two unpublished works which are generally autobiographical:

1. "An Inadvertent Hero", registered at the United States Copyright Office, and
2. "Triumphant" an unfinished memoir.
