= Daniel B. Hagar =

19th century American educator

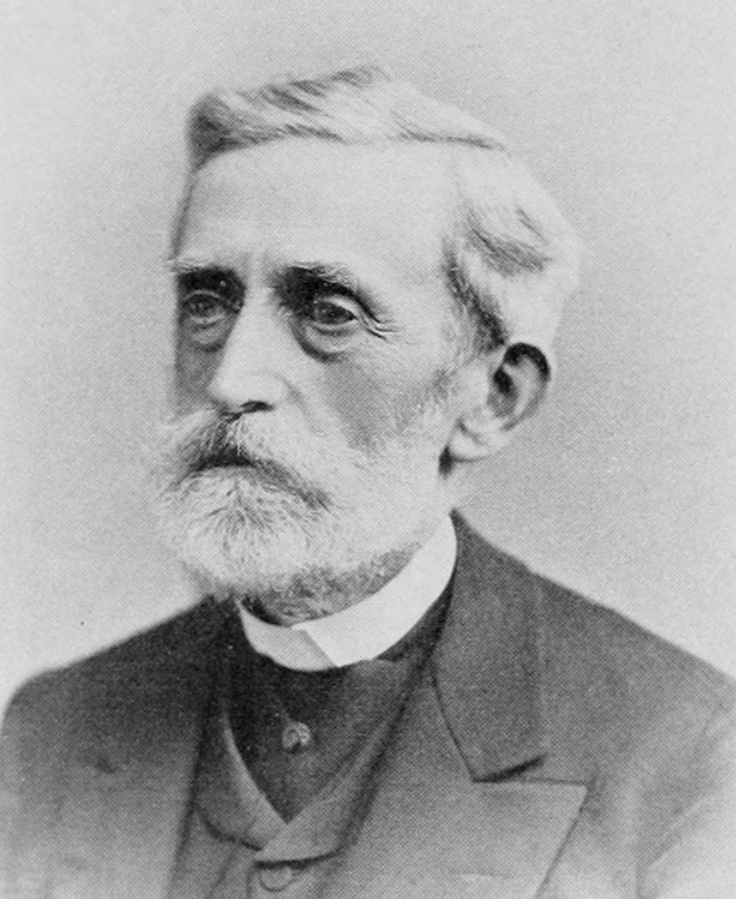
- Born: Daniel Barnard Hagar; April 22, 1820; Newton Lower Falls, Massachusetts
- Died: July 4, 1896 (aged 76); Sharon, Massachusetts
- Education: Union College
- Occupation: Educator

Daniel Barnard Hagar (April 22, 1820 – July 4, 1896) was an American educator who served as principal of the Canajoharie Academy, Norwich Academy, and Salem Normal School.

== Early life ==
Hagar was born on April 22, 1820, in Newton Lower Falls. His father died when Hagar was eight years old. He attended public schools in Newton until the age of thirteen, when he went to work in a paper factory. At the age of sixteen, Hagar began an apprenticeship in a dry goods store in Boston. The following year, Hagar decided to further his education and preparing for college under private instruction. In 1843 he graduated from Union College.

== Career ==
After graduating, Hagar studied theology under John Williams in Schenectady, New York. In 1844 he was appointed superintendent of schools in Canajoharie, New York and principal of the Canajoharie Academy. While at Canajoharie Academy, he worked with Susan B. Anthony, who served as headmistress of the female department. When Hagar was working in Salem, Massachusetts, he attended one of Anthony's talks on women's suffrage and praised her argument. Hagar married one another of Canajoharie Academy's teachers, Mary Bradford McKim. In December 1848, Hagar was appointed principal of the Norwich Academy in Norwich, New York. From 1852 to 1865 he served as headmaster of The Eliot School in Jamaica Plain. In 1857, Hagar attended the first meeting of what would become the National Education Association and wrote the organization's original constitution. In 1865, Hagar was appointed principal of the Salem Normal School (now Salem State University). During Hagar's tenure as president, the school expanded and renovated its building due to increased enrollment, expanded its curriculum, and developed a plan for a new school building that would include a training school for normal school students. In 1884, Hagar served as a Republican presidential elector for Massachusetts's 7th congressional district. He was chosen after poet John Greenleaf Whittier declined. Hagar died on July 4, 1896, in Sharon, Massachusetts.
