= Charlestown High School =

Public school in Boston, Massachusetts

Coordinates: 42.3801°N 71.0609°W

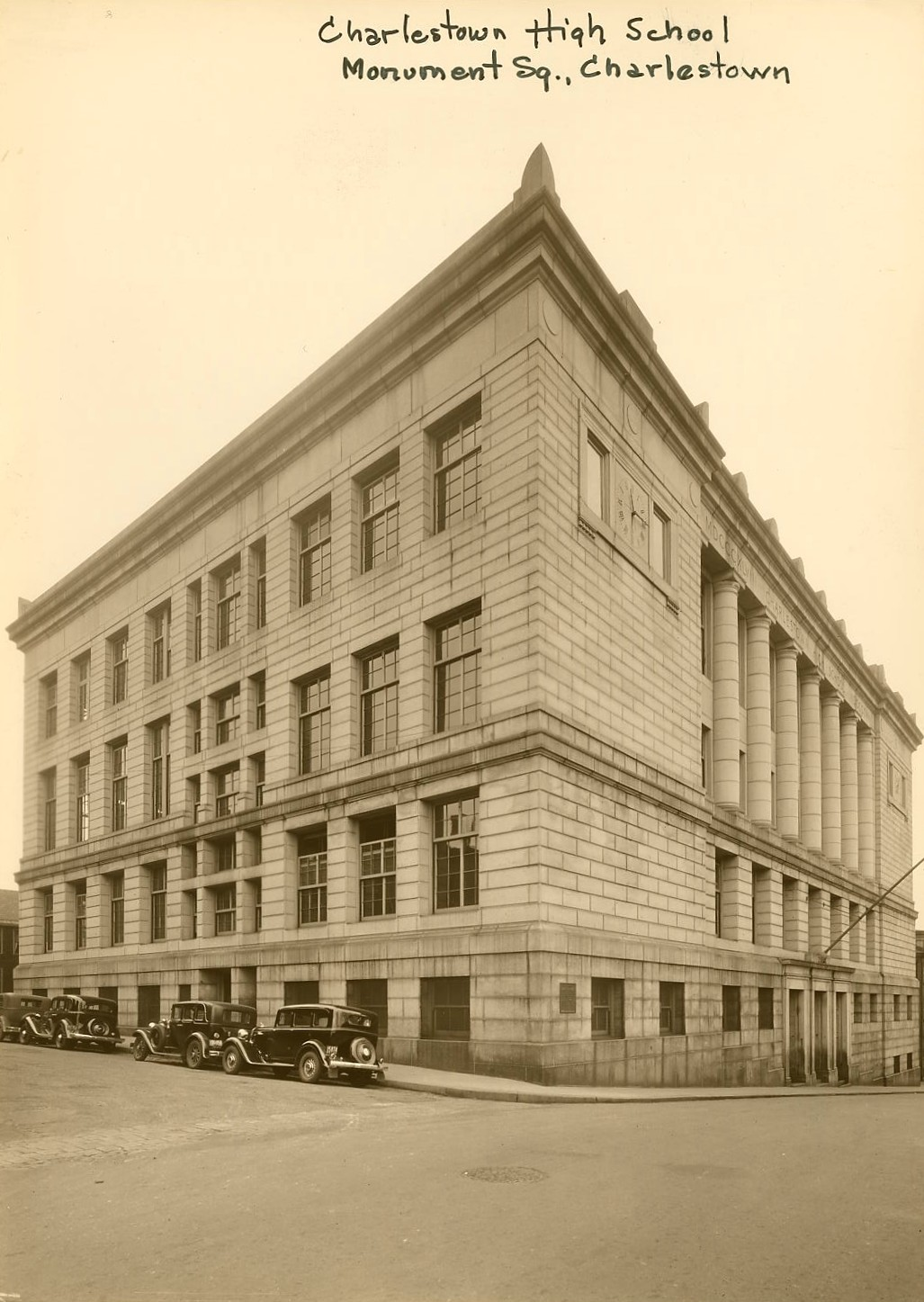

Location
- 240 Medford Street; Charlestown, Massachusetts 02129; United States

Information
- Type: Public
- Established: 1845; 181 years ago
- School district: Boston Public Schools
- Principal: Joel Stembridge
- Faculty: 72
- Teaching staff: 93.46 (FTE)
- Enrollment: 754 (2024-2025)
- Student to teacher ratio: 8.07
- Campus: Urban
- Colors: Red, White, Blue
- Athletics conference: Boston City League
- Nickname: Townies
- Website: Official Website

Charlestown High School is a public high school located at 240 Medford Street in Charlestown, Massachusetts, a neighborhood of Boston. It is the only high school in Charlestown and is part of the Boston Public Schools system.

== Academic organization ==
Charlestown High School serves students in grades nine through twelve. The school is organized into five small learning communities and pathways, which were created in 1998 and 1999.

These groups are divided between a lower school and an upper school. Each community offers a college-preparatory program and focuses on a main area of study, such as web design, law and justice, pre-engineering, business and technology, or preparation for the Massachusetts Comprehensive Assessment System (MCAS) exams.

Each community or pathway is supported by about ten teachers and one instructional leader, with teachers assigned to a specific theme.

== Demographics ==
The School Report Card reflects that 70.6% of the students enrolled in 2003-2004 were in regular education, and 7.1% in bilingual education, with a further 22.2% in special education.

The racial and ethnic composition of the student population in the school was 46% African-American, 26% Hispanic, 20% Asian, and 8% White.

== Busing and desegregation ==
Charlestown High School received considerable national attention in the 1975–1976 school year when court-mandated forced busing brought African-American children to what was at that time a predominantly white high school in an Irish neighborhood of Boston. Forced busing initially brought great discord and resulted in fights and arrests, however there were also enduring images, such as the famous photograph of a black and a white student holding hands out the window of their school bus.

Contributing to the discord was the September 28, 1979 school shooting of Darryl Williams, an African-American football player for Jamaica Plain High School, who was at Charlestown playing football. Three Irish Americans, at least one of whom had dropped out of Charlestown High School, shot Williams while he was on the field during halftime, while his team was huddled for a pep talk. Williams was permanently paralyzed from below the neck. The shooting was initially considered racially motivated, and a race riot was barely averted. Despite this, a large rally was held at Boston's City Hall Plaza in support of Williams. As a result of this incident, Charlestown did not play home football games for nine years after this incident for security reasons.

== Sports success ==
The Charlestown High School boys basketball team takes part in the Boston City League, and won the state championship for four straight years, from 1999 to 2003, and in 2005, the team won the Division 2 State Championship. During these years, the head coach was Jack O'Brien and his assistant coaches were Zach Zegarowski, Steve Cassidy and Hugh Coleman. Charlestown State Championships years:

- 1958-59: Charlestown won the Class B State Tournament
- 1977-78: Charlestown won the Division 3 State Tournament defeating Roxbury High School 52–42
- 1999-00: Charlestown won the Division 2 State Tournament defeating Greenfield High School 87–57
- 2000-01: Charlestown won the Division 2 State Tournament defeating Algonquin Regional High School 94–57
- 2001-02: Charlestown won the Division 2 State Tournament defeating Groton-Dunstable High School 88–68
- 2002-03: Charlestown won the Division 2 State Tournament defeating Hoosac Valley High School 68–51
- 2004-05: Charlestown won the Division 2 State Tournament defeating Oakmont Regional High School 68–48
- 2023-24: Charlestown won the Division 3 State Tournament defeating Old Rochester Regional High School 61–40

University of Connecticut and NBA Orlando Magic guard Shabazz Napier is a former player of the Charlestown basketball team, and his jersey was retired by the high school in January 2014.

== Notable alumni ==
- Florence Cushman (1860–1940), astronomer at the Harvard College Observatory who worked on the Henry Draper Catalogue
- Mary Edna Hill Gray Dow (1848–1914), educator, journalist, and financier
- Bob Giggie (1959–1962), major-league baseball pitcher during 1959–1962
- Tony Lee (born 1986), basketball player who played professionally in Poland and Austria
- Shabazz Napier (born 1991), basketball player who played in the NBA during 2014–2020
