= Joe O'Connor (referee) =

American boxing referee and government official (1892–1961)

Commissioner of the Boston Fire Department
- In office 1959–1960
- Preceded by: Francis X. Cotter
- Succeeded by: Henry Scagnoli

Boston Traffic Commissioner
- In office 1957–1959
- Preceded by: William Arthur Reilly
- Succeeded by: William T. Doyle

Personal details
- Born: March 30, 1892 Charlestown, Massachusetts, U.S.
- Died: October 31, 1961 (aged 69) Brighton, Massachusetts, U.S.
- Occupation: Boxing referee Civil engineer

Timothy Joseph O'Connor (1892–1961) was an American boxing referee and government official for the city of Boston who served as traffic commissioner and commissioner of the Boston Fire Department.

== Early life ==
O'Connor was born on March 30, 1892, in Charlestown. He was the youngest of eight children born to Mr. and Mrs. Andrew O'Connor of Crookston, County Cork, Ireland. He graduated from the Mechanical Arts High School in 1907 and served in the United States Army during World War I.

== Boxing ==
O'Connor became interested in boxing during his time in the Army. He made his professional debut as a referee for Frank Ducey, the matchmaker for the Casino Athletic Club of Lynn, Massachusetts. In 1920 he refereed the first ever bout regulated by the Massachusetts Boxing Commission - a fight between welterweights Nate Siegal and Paddy Flynn.

On December 21, 1920, O'Connor refereed a bout between Harry Greb and Bob Roper. During the sixth round, Greb hit O'Connor in the mouth, which caused him to bleed profusely. O'Connor grabbed Greb around the waist and planted him on his stool. Greb eventually won the 10 round fight by decision.

In 1922 O'Connor officiated a bout between light-heavyweight champion Gene Tunney and Chuck Wiggins at Mechanics Hall.

In 1924, Lawrence J. Sweeney of The Boston Globe questioned O'Connor's decision to declare Quntion Romero-Rojas victorious over Jack Renault. Sweeney felt that O'Connor had penalized Renault for "carrying" Romero-Rojas. The following year, O'Connor refereed a bout in which Jack Sharkey was given a 2 to 1 decision over George Cook. Sweeney wrote that Cook was entitled to the victory and that the officials who gave Sharkey the victory "have outlived their usefulness". He proclaimed that the decision would "just about ruin the sport in the Bay State".

On February 7, 1927, O'Connor disqualified Al Mello in the first round of his fight with George Kid Lee. It was one of Mello's four career disqualifications for low punches and one of Lee's three victories over Mello.

On April 2, 1928, O'Connor declared Roberto Roberti victorious over Ted Sandwina as a result of a foul in the third round of their fight at Mechanics' Hall. The Massachusetts Boxing Commission suspended Sandwina for three months for the foul.

On May 17, 1929, O'Connor disqualified Jim Maloney for hitting his opponent, Riccardo Bertazzolo, after the bell.

On December 13, 1929, O'Connor stopped a fight between welterweight champion Jackie Fields and Gorilla Jones in the seventh round. O'Connor believed that both men were performing below their usual standards and declared the fight a no contest.

On November 10, 1931, O'Connor declared a fight between Joe Sekyra and Paul Swiderski a no contest early in the eight round. David F. Egan of The Boston Globe described the fight as a "farcical exhibition" where the fighters "meant no harm to each other" Egan praised O'Connor for exercising "excellent self-restraint in allowing them to meander as long as they did". O'Connor warned both fighters four times before ending the bout.

On September 17, 1937, O'Connor refereed a bout between the undefeated Ralph Zannelli of Providence, Rhode Island, and Peter Jackson of Los Angeles. Although nonpartisan scoring favored Jackson, the fight was ruled to be a no-contest in what was seen as a "home-town decision". O'Connor favored Jackson while Judges Jim Shaughnessy and Eddie Curley voted for a split verdict.

Other notable bouts officiated by O'Connor include Joe Tiplitz vs. Johnnie Downs, Tommy Gibbons vs. Pat McCarthy, Hambone Kelly vs. George Robinson, Jack Britton vs. Frankie Schoell, Sully Montgomery vs. Battling McCreary, Red Chapman vs. Johnny Dundee, George Cook vs. Bob Lawson, Tommy Loughran vs. Johnny Risko, Young Stribling vs. Maxie Rosenbloom, Tiger Flowers vs. Eddie Huffman, Al Mello vs. Johnny Mendelsohn, Jack Delaney vs. Jack Humbeck, Ernie Schaaf vs. "Big Boy" Peterson, Jim Maloney vs. Tom Heeney, Johnny Indrisano vs. Vince Dundee, Johnny Indrisano vs. Lou Brouillard, Lou Brouillard vs. Sammy Slaughter, Lou Brouillard vs. Tony Shucco, Jack Sharkey vs. Phil Brubaker, and Tiger Jack Fox vs. Lou Brouillard.

== Government ==
In 1911, O'Connor joined the survey and design section of the Boston public works department's highway division as a rodman. In 1929 he was promoted to junior civil engineer and transferred to the new Boston traffic commission. He was made chief traffic engineer in 1954 and promoted to traffic commissioner in 1957. In 1959 he was named fire commissioner. He retired on January 1, 1960.

O'Connor died on October 31, 1961, at St. Elizabeth's Hospital. Mayor John F. Collins ordered all municipal flags at half-staff in respect for O'Connor.
