= Francis X. Cotter =

American government official (1895-1959)

Boston Fire Commissioner
- In office February 1, 1954 – February 26, 1959
- Preceded by: John F. Cotter
- Succeeded by: Timothy J. O'Connor

Boston Soldiers' Relief Commissioner/Director of Veterans' Services
- In office 1950–1954
- Preceded by: David J. Brickley
- Succeeded by: Victor C. Bynoe

Personal details
- Born: 1895 South Boston
- Died: February 26, 1959 (aged 63) Dorchester
- Education: Boston College

Francis X. Cotter (1895–1959) was an American government official who served as Director of Veterans' Services for the City of Boston and Commissioner of the Boston Fire Department.

== Early life ==
Cotter was born in South Boston. He attended Boston College High School and Boston College. During World War I, he served with the 101st Field Artillery Regiment of the 26th Infantry Division. He was discharged with the rank of sergeant major. After the war, Cotter worked as an assistant sales manager for Cudahy Packing Company and as an assistant office manager for Libby, McNeil & Libby.

== VFW ==
In 1926, Cotter was elected commander of the Thomas J. Fitzgerald Veterans of Foreign Wars Post. From 1929 to 1930 he served as a lobbyist for the VFW. On June 24, 1934, Cotter was elected State Commander of the VFW, receiving 376 votes to Frankland W. L. Miles’ 306 and Frank L. Carey’s 24. He declined to be nominated for a second term and was succeeded by Fred T. Openshaw in 1935.

== Government service ==
In 1927, Cotter became a corrections officer at the Boston House of Correction. He was later put in charge of the remodeling and construction of the prison’s buildings. In 1947, Governor Maurice J. Tobin appointed Cotter Commissioner of Aid and Pensions. In 1950, he was appointed Soldiers' Relief Commissioner and Director of Veterans' Services for the City of Boston by Mayor John Hynes.

On February 1, 1954, Cotter was appointed Commissioner of the Boston Fire Department. In July 1954, Cotter implemented a reorganization plan that resulted in the closure of two stations (one of which was only three years old), the deactivation of 3 fire companies, and the reassignment of 83 firemen. By 1959, Cotter had reduced the number of BFD employees by 185 by leaving vacancies unfilled. The city’s consolidation efforts were opposed by the Boston Firefighters Union, who accused Cotter and Hynes of providing inadequate protection to Dorchester.

== Death ==
On February 26, 1959, Cotter returned to his home at noon to eat lunch and tend to his ill wife. While washing his hands before lunch, Cotter became unresponsive. The fire department attempted resuscitation efforts, but were unsuccessful. The department’s physician attributed his death to Coronary thrombosis. He was 63 years old.
