= Benjamin W. Wells (fire commissioner) =

American fire commissioner (1861–1912)

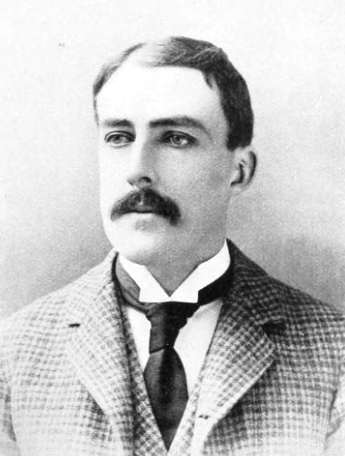

Boston Fire Commissioner
- In office March 20, 1905 – January 31, 1908
- Preceded by: Henry S. Russell
- Succeeded by: Samuel D. Parker

Boston Street Commissioner
- In office February 4, 1896 – February 1, 1900
- Preceded by: Bertrand T. Wheeler
- Succeeded by: Bertrand T. Wheeler

Personal details
- Born: October 15, 1861 Boston, Massachusetts
- Died: January 18, 1912 (aged 50) Boston, Massachusetts
- Party: Democratic
- Education: Harvard College

Benjamin Williams Wells (October 15, 1861 – January 18, 1912) was an American government official and political activist who served as commissioner of the Boston Fire Department.

== Early life ==
Wells was born in Boston on October 15, 1861. He attended Hopkinson's School and graduated from Harvard College in 1884. In 1886 he joined E. Williams & Co., a Boston shipping firm involved in trade in South America and Dutch Guiana. In 1890 he founded the United States Fire Signal Company, a private automatic fire alarm service. He was the company's general manager until it merged with an older firm to become the Boston Automatic Fire Alarm Company, where Wells worked as treasurer.

== Politics ==
Wells volunteered for a number of Democratic campaigns. In 1890 he joined the Ward 11 Democratic City Committee and was elected secretary of Young Men's Democratic Club. He became chairman of the both organizations in 1894. For many years he was Ward 11's representative to the Democratic state committee.

== Government service ==
On January 27, 1896, Wells was nominated for superintendent of streets by Boston Mayor Josiah Quincy. He was unanimously confirmed by the Board of Aldermen on February 3, which The Boston Globe described as an "unusual complement". He took office the following day. In October 1899, Wells was appointed acting water commissioner after John R. Murphy resigned to enter that year's mayoral election. Republican Thomas N. Hart won the election and Wells was replaced as commissioner on February 1, 1900.

In 1905, Wells was appointed commissioner of the Boston Fire Department. He succeeded acting commissioner Patrick J. Kennedy, who took over the department following the death of Henry S. Russell. Republican George A. Hibbard was elected in the 1907 Boston mayoral election. In January 1908, the finance committee of the board of alderman issued a report which contended that during the tenures of Daniel A. Whelton and John F. Fitzgerald, political influence affected appointments to the department and that the "malign influence of politics" was interfering with its efficiency. On January 30, Hibbard wrote to Wells that he was "strongly of the opinion that the organization of the fire department at the present time is sadly lacking in discipline" and requested his resignation. Wells objected to Hibbard's criticisms and refused to resign. Later that day, Hibbard removed Wells from office "for the good of the service" effective the following day. He was replaced by Samuel D. Parker.

== Later life ==
After leaving the fire department, Wells worked in the real estate business. On January 18, 1912, he went to the Puritan Club after several days of illness. After exiting his vehicle, Wells collapsed and died of heart disease. His funeral was held on January 20 at the Arlington Street Church with a number of political figures and members of the fire department in attendance.
