= Leo D. Fay =

U.S. Navy ensign

Leo Daniel Fay
- Born: November 6, 1917; Boston, Massachusetts
- Died: May 18, 1945 (aged 27); Pacific Ocean
- Military career
- Allegiance: United States of America
- Branch: United States Navy
- Rank: Ensign
- Commands: USS Douglas H. Fox (DD-779)
- Conflicts: World War II
- Awards: Navy Cross (1); Purple Heart (1)

Leo D. Fay (November 6, 1917 - May 18, 1945) was a United States Navy ensign who received the Navy Cross and Purple Heart during his service as a unrestricted line officer in World War II.

== Early life ==
Fay was born in Boston, Massachusetts on November 6, 1917 to Lawrence Anthony and Mary Agnes Fay. He graduated from Jamaica Plain High School in Jamaica Plain, Massachusetts. Fay then went on to further his studies at Massachusetts State College in Amherst, Massachusetts, majoring in Animal husbandry graduating in 1939. He married Elizabeth Anderson in 1944.

== U.S. Navy career ==
Fay enlisted in the United States Naval Reserve in 1943 and was commissioned as an Ensign. His initial assignments with the Navy were aboard the destroyer USS Douglas H. Fox (DD-779) as a line officer. On the evening of May 17, 1945 Japanese aircraft attacked the destroyer from all sides and one of the planes crashed into the forecastle of his ship and demolishing the forward bulkhead and deck near his work center. Ensign Fay while being critically injured in the kamikaze attack commanded his men to conduct repairs to the ship until succumbing to his wounds. Fay was awarded the Navy Cross posthumously.

His award citation reads:

The President of the United States of America takes pride in presenting the Navy Cross (Posthumously) to Ensign Leo Daniel Fay, United States Naval Reserve, for extraordinary heroism and distinguished service in the line of his profession while serving as Officer-in-Charge of the Forward Repair Party, on board the Destroyer U.S.S. DOUGLAS H. FOX (DD-779), when that vessel was attacked by enemy Japanese aircraft off the coast of Okinawa Gunto, on the evening of 17 May 1945. Courageous and determined when an overwhelming number of Japanese aircraft viciously attacked his force from all sides and one of the planes crashed into the forecastle of his ship, demolishing the forward bulkhead and part of the deck near his station, Ensign Fay, despite critical injuries and severe burns suffered in the rapidly spreading flames, steadfastly refused assistance and, valiantly remaining in command, continued to direct his men in conducting repair activities and combating the fire until he was carried below for medical attention. Subsequently succumbing to his wounds, Ensign Fay, by his unwavering fortitude, dauntless perseverance and zealous conduct in defense of his ship, had served as a constant inspiration to his men and was in large measure responsible for saving the DOUGLAS H. FOX for further action against the enemy. His great personal valor and self-sacrificing devotion to duty throughout the fierce action reflect the highest credit upon himself and the United States Naval Service. He gallantly gave his life for his country.
