= Henry Scagnoli =

American government official

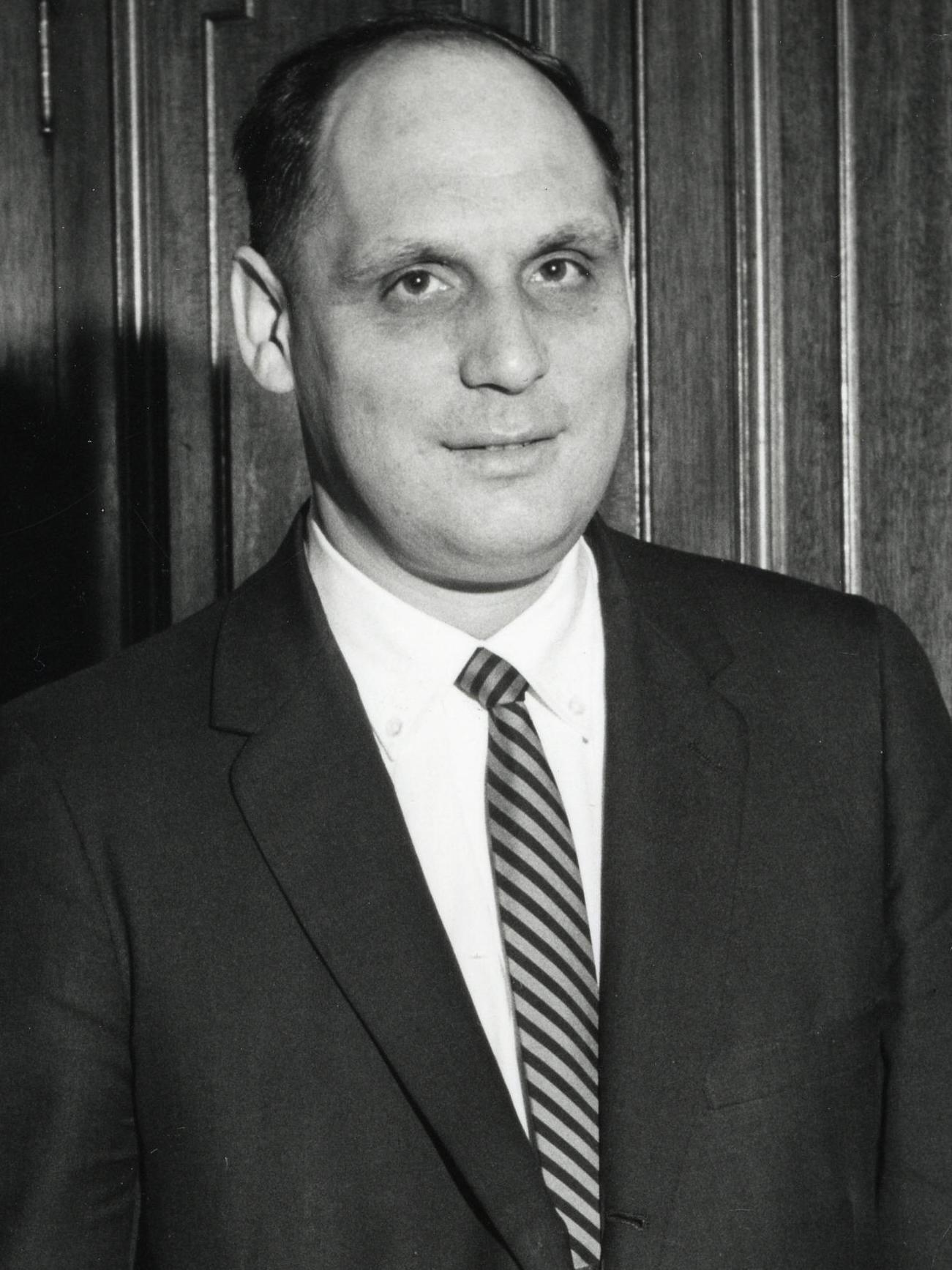
- Scagnoli in the 1960s

Deputy Mayor of Boston
- In office 1961–1966
- Preceded by: John P. McMorrow
- Succeeded by: Arthur Coffey

Boston Fire Commissioner
- In office Acting: July 8, 1966 – August 17, 1966
- Preceded by: Thomas Griffin
- Succeeded by: William J. Fitzgerald
- In office 1960–1961
- Preceded by: Timothy J. O'Connor
- Succeeded by: Thomas Griffin

Personal details
- Born: May 6, 1922 Jamaica Plain
- Died: May 3, 2015 (aged 92) West Roxbury
- Party: Democratic
- Spouse: Mary Daly (1949–2007; her death)
- Education: Northeastern University

Henry A. Scagnoli (1922–2015) was an American government official who served as deputy mayor and fire commissioner during the administration of Boston Mayor John F. Collins.

== Early life ==
Scagnoli was born on May 6, 1922, in Jamaica Plain. He graduated from Jamaica Plain High School in 1939. During high school he took a typing and dictation class at the urging of his mother. As a result, he was assigned to an office job at a naval base in Newfoundland during World War II.

== Business career ==
After the war, Scagnoli worked for an insurance firm. In 1949 he married a co-worker, Mary Daly. He attended night classes at Northeastern University on the GI Bill and graduated with a degree in management in 1952. He eventually left the insurance business to become an executive with Waldo Brothers, a building supply business.

== Politics ==
In 1946, Scagnoli campaigned for a state representative candidate in Jamaica Plain. That candidate lost to John F. Collins. Scagnoli grew to admire Collins and when he ran for a seat in the Massachusetts Senate in 1950, Scagnoli managed his campaign. Scagnoli managed Collins' campaign in the 1959 Boston mayoral election, which saw Collins defeat Senate President John E. Powers in what was seen as one of the city's biggest political upsets.

On December 20, 1959, Mayor-elected Collins named Scagnoli to the position of fire commissioner. He was sworn in on January 4, 1960. At the age of 37, Scagnoli was the youngest person appointed to the position. As commissioner, Scagnoli led a "space heater research program", which cut space heater deaths from 15 in the winter of 1959–60 to 0 in 1960–61.

In 1961, Scagnoli became director of administrative services, a position also referred to as deputy mayor. In this role, Collins tasked Scagnoli with balancing the city's payroll and reducing the number of civil servants. From 1960 to 1966, the city eliminated 1450 positions, however these efforts were undermined somewhat by the school committee, which added 874.

In 1962, Scagnoli was a finalist for the position of Boston police commissioner, but Collins opted to appoint FBI agent Edmund McNamara instead. In July 1966, Scagnoli was appointed acting fire commissioner following the death of Thomas Griffin. He continued to serve a dual role as deputy mayor and fire commissioner until William J. Fitzgerald was sworn in on August 17. In October 1966, Scagnoli stepped down as deputy mayor for the lower paying position of deputy school construction engineer. He remained with the Boston Public Schools' planning and engineering department for over two decades.

== Later life ==
After Mary Scagnoli's health began to fail, the couple moved to an assisted living facility in West Roxbury. After her death in 2007, he remained at the facility, where, as one of the more active residents, he assisted other residents by driving them short distances. Scagnoli died on May 3, 2015, after falling ill with pneumonia.
