= Jamaica Plain High School =

High school in Boston, Massachusetts

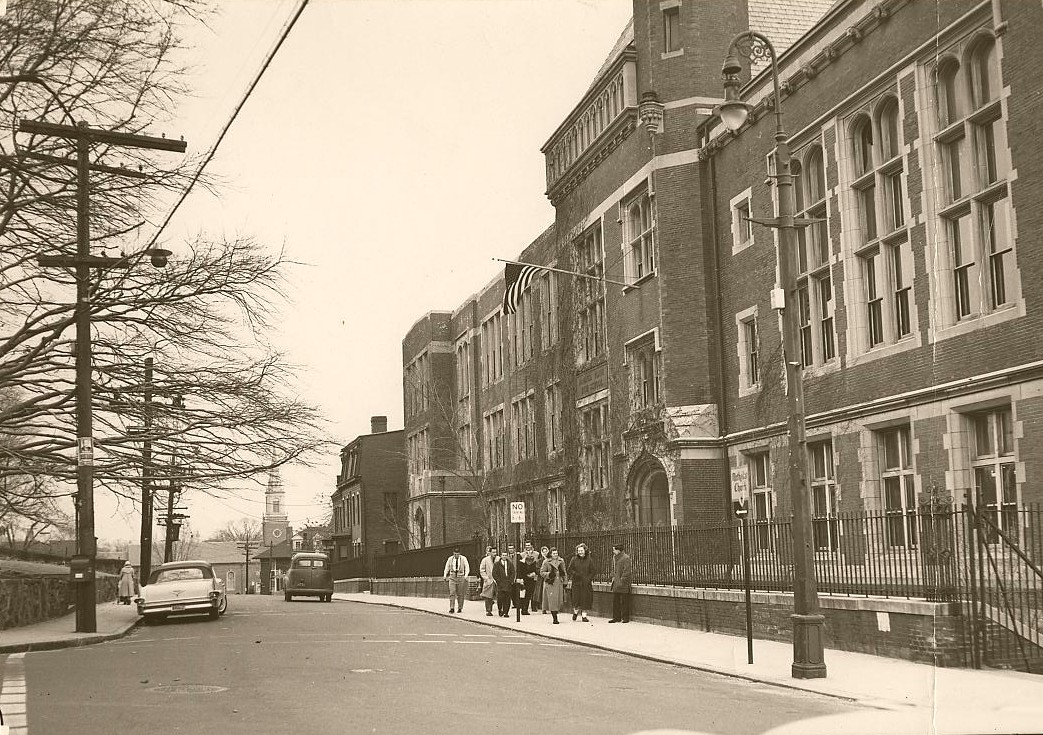
- External view of the high school ca. 1959

Location
- 144 McBride Street; Jamaica Plain, Massachusetts 02130; United States; 42.3063°N 71.1094°W

Information
- Type: Public high school
- Established: 1849
- Headmaster: (1980–1989) Stacy T. Johnson
- Faculty: 77 (1982)
- Enrollment: 1089 (1982)
- Color: Purple Gold
- Team name: Knights
- Yearbook: Clarion (1971)

Jamaica Plain High School is a defunct four-year public high school that served students in ninth through twelfth grades in the Boston neighborhood of Jamaica Plain, Massachusetts, United States. The school held its first classes in 1849 and was last located at 144 McBride Street from 1979 until its closure in 1989.

== History ==
=== The Eliot School ===
The beginnings of Jamaica Plain High School reaches back to the year 1676, when the town of "Roxborough" (which included Jamaica Plain, Roslindale, and West Roxbury) received from residents including Hugh Thomas and John Ruggles, money (payable in corn) and land "for use of a school only". The first school was built at the site of the present-day Soldiers' Monument at the intersection of South and Centre streets. Reverend John Eliot of Roxbury in 1689 gave 75 acres of land to the town "for the maintenance, support, and encouragement of a school and schoolmaster at...Jamaica or Pond Plain" in order to prevent "the inconveniences of ignorance". The school thereafter took its benefactor's name, and a second Eliot School was erected at the same site in 1731. The third school was built in 1787 on the corner of Centre and Green Streets, and a fourth in 1832 on Eliot Street where it continues into the 21st century to offer varied courses to both children and adults. The Trustees of the Eliot School were incorporated in 1804. Stewardship of the Eliot School was a joint supervision between the trustees and the town of Roxbury, and later West Roxbury, after its secession from Roxbury in 1851.

=== Eliot/West Roxbury/Jamaica Plain High School ===
In 1849 Eliot became a high school, with boys and girls separated into different divisions. In 1855, the newly independent town of West Roxbury took control of the school and the girls’ department was moved to Village Hall on Thomas Street. In 1858 the boys’ department moved there as well, with the 24 Eliot Street location being leased to the town, which then used it as a primary school. In 1868, the Eliot High School moved to a new building on Elm Street. When the town of West Roxbury was annexed to the City of Boston in 1874, the trustees of the Eliot School withdrew their support and terminated their connection to the high school and decided to move back to the 24 Eliot Street building. During this time, the school became known as West Roxbury High, a name that appeared on the new building constructed at the Elm Street location in 1898. In July 1923, the school's name was changed to Jamaica Plain High.

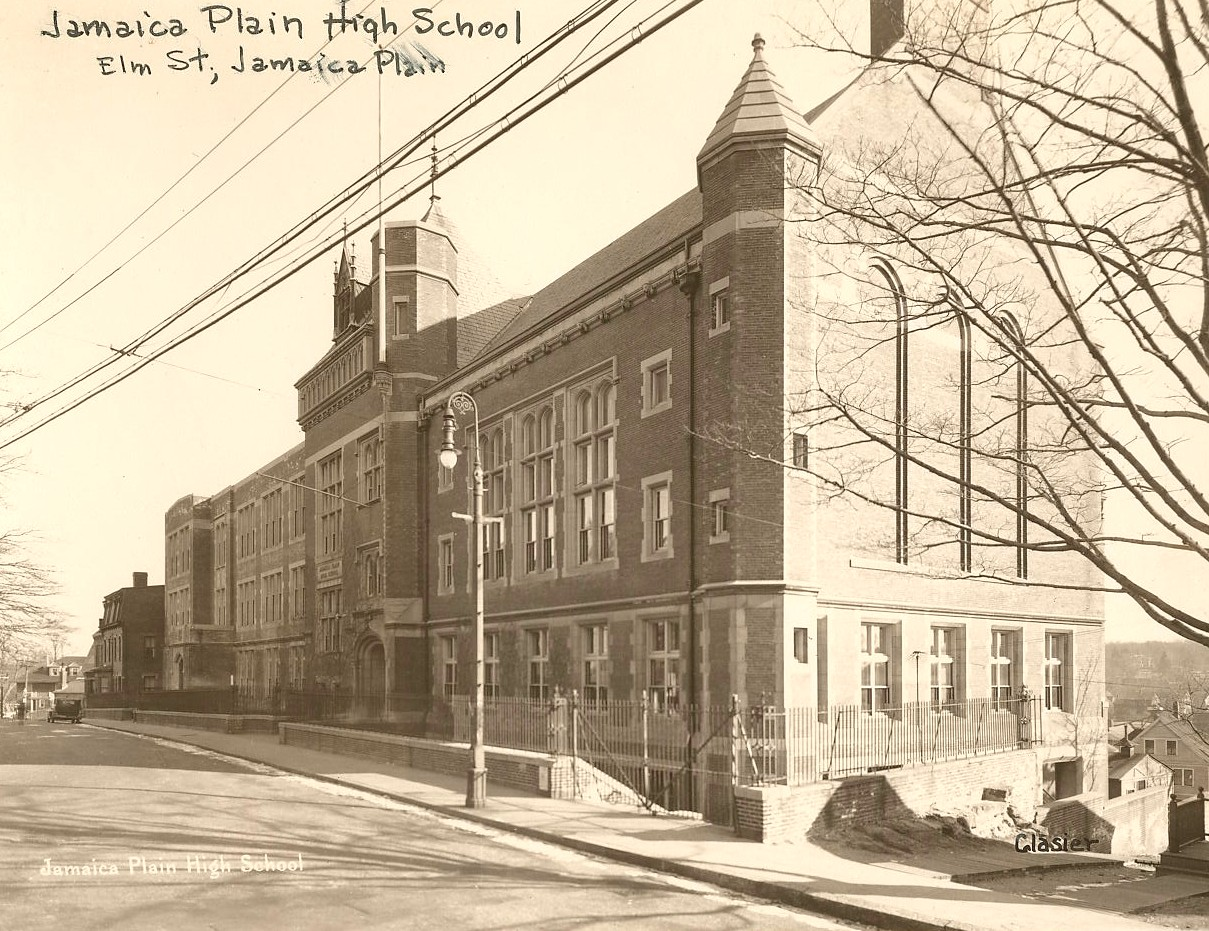
West Roxbury High (1900–1923) Jamaica Plain High (1923–1979)

=== Later years ===
In the spring of 1974, US Federal Judge W. Arthur Garrity Jr. ordered a desegregation plan of Boston public schools with a goal of achieving racial balance throughout the system. This caused overcrowding at JP High, forcing an annex for ninth grade students to open at the Charles Bulfinch School on Parker Street in Roxbury. Differing plans were in place at this time for a replacement of JP High, including proposals for Southwest High School I in West Roxbury (later becoming West Roxbury High, reinstituting a name not in use since 1923) and Southwest High School II in Jamaica Plain.

In 1975, Mayor Kevin White announced intentions to refurbish a Boston Gas Company building in Jamaica Plain on a 10-acre site originally to be named Forest Hills High School, replacing JP High. Original plans called for the school to be completed by mid-1976. The $12.3 million facility was designed by Walter S. Pierce and opened for the fall 1979–80 term, retaining the JP High name.

With a vote by the Boston School Committee on July 25, 1989, JP High was closed, and the building became home to The English High School.

== Headmasters and principals ==
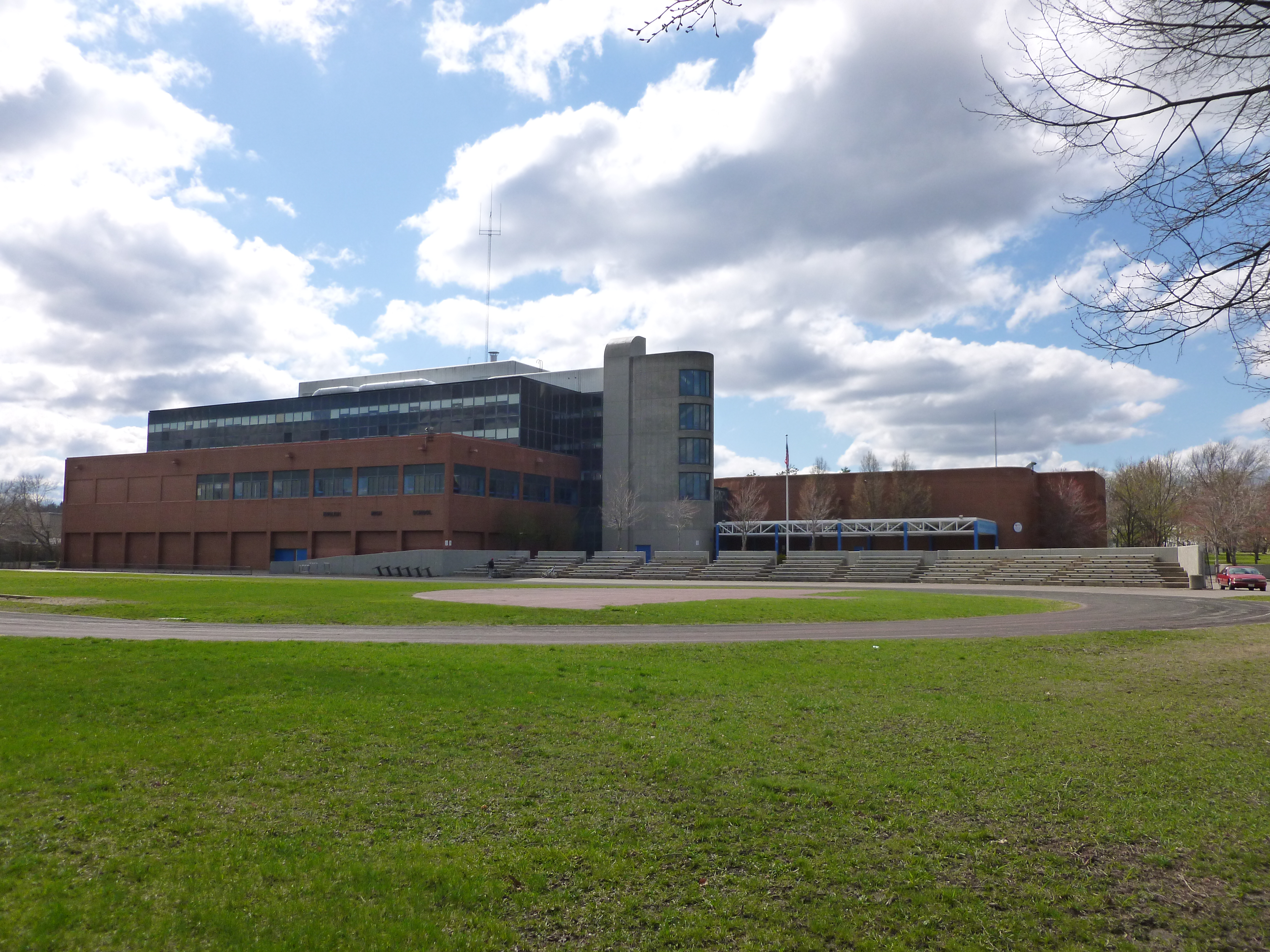
Jamaica Plain High (1979–1989)

- (1852–1865) Daniel B. Hagar
  - (1852) Emma F. Bacheler (girls)
- (1865–1879) Edward W. Howe
  - (1878–1879) George C. Mann, Acting
- (1879–1914) George C. Mann
- (1914–1919) Oscar C. Gallagher
- (1919–1939) Maurice J. Lacey
- (1939–1960) John B. Casey
- (1960–1967) Edward F. Brickley
- (1967–1969) Joseph F. Callahan
- (1970–1971) Roger Connor
- (1973–1979) Edward F. McHugh
  - (1979–1980) Ronald Spratling, Acting
- (1980–1989) Stacy T. Johnson

== Notable alumni ==
- Leo D. Fay, Navy Cross and Purple Heart recipient
- Sophia Hayden, architect
- Caroline Hewins, librarian
- Dan Kiley, landscape architect
- Rose Finkelstein Norwood, labor organizer
- Henry Scagnoli, Deputy Mayor of Boston
- Oswald Tippo, botanist and educator
- John Torchetti, ice hockey player and coach
- Darryl Williams, motivational speaker and advocate
- Joe Wilson, former NFL running back

== See also ==
- Boston Public Schools
- Forest Hills, Boston
- Jamaica Plain
