= 1939 Massachusetts legislature =

151st Massachusetts General Court
←	150th	152nd	→

Overview
- Legislative body: General Court
- Election: November 8, 1938

Senate
- Members: 40
- President: Joseph R. Cotton (7th Middlesex district)
- Party control: Republican

House
- Members: 240
- Speaker: Christian Herter (5th Suffolk)
- Party control: Republican

Sessions
- 1st: January 4, 1939 – August 12, 1939

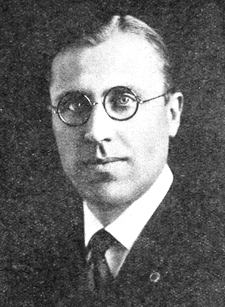
Joseph Cotton, Senate president.

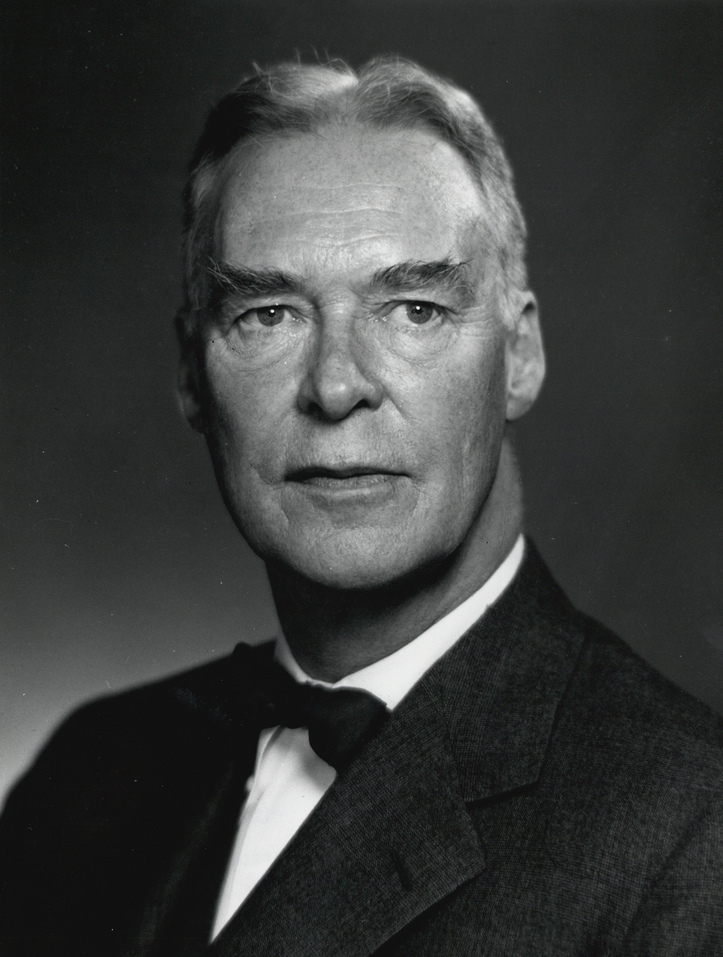
Christian Herter, House speaker.

Leaders of the Massachusetts General Court, 1939.

The 151st Massachusetts General Court, consisting of the Massachusetts Senate and the Massachusetts House of Representatives, met in 1939 during the governorship of Leverett Saltonstall. Joseph R. Cotton served as president of the Senate and Christian Herter served as speaker of the House.

"1939 was the first year the General Court began meeting every other year instead of annually. ...No session was held in 1940 and no legislation or other materials relating thereof was published during that year."

== Senators ==
Portrait	Name	Date of birth	District
	Frank David Babcock	August 16, 1877	4th Essex
	Wilfred P. Bazinet		
	Chandler Bigelow		
	Arthur Franklin Blanchard	January 27, 1883	
	David M. Brackman	September 16, 1900	6th Suffolk
	Thomas M. Burke	May 30, 1898	
	Albert Cole (Massachusetts politician)	December 28, 1904	
	Louis Benedict Connors		
	Joseph R. Cotton	November 16, 1890	
	Laurence Curtis	September 3, 1893	
	Chester A. Dolan Jr.	September 20, 1907	
	Joseph F. Francis	July 2, 1893	
	Eugene H. Giroux	January 20, 1903	
	Angier Goodwin	January 30, 1881	
	William Patrick Grant	November 5, 1904	
	James A. Gunn	June 7, 1883	
	Cornelius F. Haley	July 15, 1875	
	Arthur W. Hollis	April 29, 1877	
	Newland H. Holmes	August 30, 1891	
	Jarvis Hunt (politician)	March 28, 1904	
	Thomas H. Johnston	March 5, 1872	
	John E. Kerrigan	October 1, 1908	
	George W. Krapf		
	Thomas J. Lane	July 6, 1898	
	Joseph A. Langone Jr.	September 8, 1896	
	Harold R. Lundgren	May 22, 1894	
	John D. Mackay	April 7, 1872	
	Joseph Patrick McCooey		
	Charles Gardner Miles	December 2, 1879	
	Joseph F. Montminy		
	Edward O'Hearn Mullowney		
	Joseph L. Murphy	January 25, 1907	
	Donald W. Nicholson	August 11, 1888	
	Edward H. Nutting	July 6, 1869	
	Edwin Lawrence Olander	October 31, 1891	
	Edmund S. Oppenheimer		
	Harris S. Richardson	January 10, 1887	
	Mason Sears	December 29, 1899	
	Chester T. Skibinski		
	Bernard Lucian Sullivan		

== Representatives ==
Portrait	Name	Date of birth	District
	Wilfred J. Achin	May 12, 1891	14th Middlesex
	William A. Akeroyd	October 24, 1883	
	Theodore Andrews	August 23, 1893	
	George T. Ashe	February 6, 1905	
	Josiah Babcock Jr.	May 21, 1880	
	Robert S. Backus		
	William Brooks Baker	January 10, 1879	
	William A. Baldwin	January 18, 1874	
	Philip Barnet	December 2, 1892	
	Frederick M. Barnicoat		
	George L. Barrus	December 15, 1880	
	Thomas A. Barry	May 12, 1895	
	Walter Ray Baylies	April 28, 1902	
	Fred D. Beaudoin		
	Malcolm Lawrie Bell	November 30, 1890	
	Albert Bergeron	June 28, 1877	
	Albert Bergeron	June 23, 1886	
	Alfred M. Bessette	March 25, 1876	
	Albert F. Bigelow	October 4, 1880	10th Norfolk
	Fred Arthur Blake	January 13, 1895	
	Edward Boland	October 1, 1911	
	Albert Lionel Bourgeois	June 7, 1899	
	Philip Griggs Bowker	April 17, 1899	
	G. Edward Bradley	October 21, 1906	
	Edward T. Brady	October 23, 1908	
	Daniel Joseph Bresnahan	September 30, 1888	
	Warren Kingsbury Brimblecom	June 25, 1899	
	J. Kenney Brooks		
	Russell P. Brown	August 24, 1891	
	Frank Eben Brown	January 14, 1890	
	William Albert Brown	February 5, 1888	
	Arthur I. Burgess	October 13, 1894	
	Harland Burke	April 22, 1888	
	John F. Burns		
	J. Elmer Callahan		
	Colin James Cameron	August 24, 1879	
	Robert Patterson Campbell	December 20, 1887	
	Matthew J. Capeless	June 4, 1875	
	Enrico Cappucci	1910	
	Andrew F. Carlin		
	Gustaf A. Carlson		
	Fred Carpenter		
	Sydney G. Carpenter Jr.		
	John Henry Carroll		
	Eddie D. Carson		
	William J. Casey (Massachusetts politician)	June 27, 1905	
	Bernard P. Casey	July 29, 1894	
	John M. Cawley		
	Ralph Vester Clampit	March 28, 1896	
	Frank Clarkson	June 21, 1877	
	Andrew J. Coakley	November 6, 1906	
	John W. Coddaire Jr.		
	James S. Coffey	February 5, 1899	
	John T. Comerford	June 8, 1887	
	Michael H. Condron		
	Michael John Conway		
	Charles H. Cooke	May 13, 1878	
	Arthur W. Coolidge	October 13, 1881	
	August Joseph Cormier		
	George Chauncey Cousens	September 20, 1905	
	Francis X. Coyne	March 15, 1892	
	Thomas F. Coyne		
	John Joseph Craven	August 29, 1907	
	Nelson B. Crosby	June 20, 1871	
	Jeremiah Dickson Crowley	May 16, 1911	
	Leslie Bradley Cutler	March 24, 1890	
	Lawrence Harvard Davis		
	George F. Dean		
	Hiram Nichols Dearborn	December 21, 1867	
	Roger Dennett	September 14, 1895	
	Oscar DeRoy		
	Leo E. Diehl		
	Grover N. Dodge		
	Fred Belding Dole	January 23, 1895	
	Cornelius P. Donovan	March 15, 1895	
	Susan Bradley Donovan	October 2, 1895	
	Joseph H. Downey	December 6, 1890	
	Anthony R. Doyle	August 8, 1895	
	Ernest W. Dullea	January 14, 1891	
	Edwin F. Eldredge		
	Sven August Erickson	December 9, 1875	
	Gustave William Everberg	June 24, 1890	
	Michael Paul Feeney	March 26, 1907	
	William Daniel Fleming	April 14, 1907	
	Keith Falconer Fletcher	September 24, 1900	
	Paul W. Foster		
	Douglass Brooks Francis		
	Stephen L. French	March 9, 1892	
	Clarence Henry Fuller		
	Richard I. Furbush	January 4, 1904	
	Thomas F. Gibson		
	William R. Gilman		
	Paul Martin Goddard		
	Hollis M. Gott	May 25, 1885	
	Peter J. Graham		
	Thomas J. Hannon	December 9, 1900	
	Joseph J. Harnisch	December 28, 1883	
	William Henry Haskell		
	William Alexander Hastings	February 22, 1868	
	Lawrence Alanson Haworth	May 23, 1871	
	Charles W. Hedges	March 27, 1901	
	Christian Herter	March 28, 1895	
	Joseph Allan Hines		
	Charles V. Hogan	April 12, 1897	
	Theodore P. Hollis		
	Charles F. Holman	June 21, 1892	
	Hugh C. Hunter		
	Fred A. Hutchinson	April 5, 1881	
	Charles John Innes	June 1, 1901	
	George A. Innes		
	Harvey Iris		
	Adolph Johnson	July 20, 1885	
	William A. Jones	March 27, 1885	
	Peter John Jordan	July 23, 1910	
	Harry Kalus		
	Charles Kaplan	September 26, 1895	
	Charles A. Kelley	March 24, 1862	
	Francis Joseph Kelley	March 21, 1890	
	John Joseph Kerrigan Jr.		
	John V. Kimball	July 17, 1875	
	Rudolph King	November 2, 1887	
	John Quincy Knowles	May 21, 1895	
	Morris Kritzman		
	Leo P. Landry	July 10, 1897	
	John Whitin Lasell		
	Laurence W. Law		
	Walter E. Lawrence	December 8, 1905	
	George J. Leary		
	Frank M. Leonardi	August 17, 1891	
	Ralph Lerche	August 19, 1899	
	Thomas E. Linehan		
	Terrance Joseph Lomax Jr.	August 29, 1907	
	William Christopher Lunney	December 24, 1910	
	Joseph Francis Luz		
	Philip J. Lynch		
	Donald Alexander MacDonald	February 21, 1893	
	Frank E. MacLean		
	Arthur Ulton Mahan	June 18, 1900	
	Ralph Collins Mahar	January 4, 1912	
	John Francis Manning	January 4, 1906	
	Philip M. Markley	March 28, 1897	
	James P. McAndrews		
	Charles Joseph McCaffrey	January 16, 1898	
	Paul Andrew McCarthy	December 23, 1902	
	Thomas Francis McCready		
	James Patrick McDevitt		
	James J. McGrail		
	Lawrence P. McHugh		
	Hubert L. McLaughlin		
	George Francis McMahon		
	Philip McMorrow		
	James Joseph Mellen	June 16, 1910	
	Joseph A. Melley	March 1, 1902	
	Julian R. Merchant		
	Joseph A. Milano	April 8, 1883	
	Daniel Joseph Minihan		
	William E. Mooney		
	Alfred James Moore	August 7, 1891	
	Walter James Moran	December 22, 1903	
	Lester Bertram Morley	April 19, 1903	
	Albert Edward Morris	April 4, 1903	
	Frank J. Morrison	September 2, 1902	
	Eric A. Nelson	July 6, 1899	
	Michael J. Neville	October 19, 1899	
	Leo F. Nourse		
	Joseph N. O'Kane	May 26, 1873	
	Tip O'Neill	December 9, 1912	
	George Joseph O'Shea	November 16, 1899	
	Charles William Olson	August 24, 1889	
	David M. Owens Jr.		
	Raymond P. Palmer	December 27, 1895	
	George Alanson Parker		
	Royal Bartlett Patriquin	January 7, 1895	
	James Austin Peckham		
	Harold Squire Pedler		
	Tycho Mouritz Petersen	August 29, 1892	
	Frederick Everett Pierce	May 5, 1862	
	Roy W. Pigeon		
	John E. Powers	November 10, 1910	
	John D. Pratt		
	Benjamin B. Priest		
	William Eben Ramsdell	May 4, 1895	
	William G. Reed		
	George Edmund Rice	February 22, 1899	
	Ralph Lewis Ricketson		
	Joseph N. Roach	March 22, 1883	
	Charles Holmes Roberts Jr.		
	George Whiting Roberts		
	Nathan Rosenfeld	January 31, 1906	
	Cyrus Cole Rounseville Jr.		
	William H. J. Rowan	June 21, 1879	
	Albert Rubin	January 15, 1872	
	William F. Runnells	February 18, 1865	
	Roland D. Sawyer	January 8, 1874	
	William J. Sessions	December 18, 1859	
	Philip Sherman		
	Edward Sirois	December 18, 1898	
	Frank William Smith	January 26, 1895	
	George E. Smith		
	Roy C. Smith	January 28, 1890	
	H. Edward Snow	April 25, 1914	
	J. Francis Southgate	May 4, 1883	
	Manford Root Spalding		
	Richard H. Stacy	August 18, 1864	
	Edward William Staves	May 9, 1887	
	Avery W. Steele	August 1, 1907	
	George Ward Stetson	May 31, 1902	
	Leo J. Sullivan	December 8, 1905	
	Charles F. Jeff Sullivan		
	Jeremiah Joseph Sullivan	March 9, 1905	
	John Timothy Sullivan	March 27, 1906	
	Patrick Gilbert Sullivan	November 18, 1904	
	Martin Swanson	July 20, 1872	
	Chester Randall Swenson		
	Joseph A. Sylvia Jr.	September 16, 1903	
	Valmore P. Tetreault		
	Nathaniel Tilden	November 3, 1903	
	James Francis Tobin	May 8, 1903	
	John E. Troy Jr.		
	Herbert Lewis Trull		
	Cornelius Joseph Twomey		
	Christopher J. Tyrrell	June 21, 1895	
	John H. Valentine	July 21, 1896	
	James L. Vallely		
	John W. Vaughan	March 20, 1878	
	James T. Violette		
	Ira C. Ward	March 7, 1862	
	John B. Wenzler	June 11, 1881	
	Edgar A. Whitcomb		
	John Philip White		
	William Emmet White	June 1, 1900	
	Otis M. Whitney	March 25, 1909	
	Joseph L. Whiton		
	Ralph E. Williams		
	Frederick Willis (American politician)	May 18, 1904	
	Carl A. Woekel		
	Henry Eden Wright		
	Morton E. York		
	Arthur Lincoln Youngman		
	Abraham I. Zimon		

== See also ==
- 76th United States Congress
- List of Massachusetts General Courts
