= Gardner W. Pearson =

American politician (1869–1953)

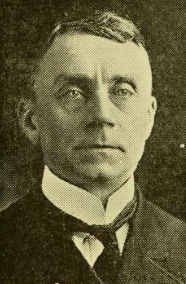

Adjutant General of Massachusetts
- In office January 5, 1911 – May 1, 1914
- Preceded by: William H. Brigham
- Succeeded by: Charles H. Cole
- In office August 6, 1916 – March 16, 1917
- Preceded by: Charles H. Cole
- Succeeded by: Jesse F. Stevens

Member of the Massachusetts House of Representatives for the 7th Middlesex district
- In office 1920–1923
- Preceded by: Edward B. Eames
- Succeeded by: Charles P. Howard

Personal details
- Born: September 4, 1869 Lowell, Massachusetts
- Died: June 23, 1953 (aged 83) Lowell, Massachusetts
- Resting place: Hildreth Cemetery; Lowell, Massachusetts
- Party: Democratic Party (1890–1916); Republican Party (1916–1953)
- Occupation: Attorney

Gardner Whitman Pearson (September 4, 1869 – June 23, 1953) was an American military officer and politician who served as Adjutant General of Massachusetts from 1911 to 1914 and 1916 to 1917.

== Early life ==
Pearson was born on September 4, 1869, in Lowell, Massachusetts. He attended the Massachusetts Institute of Technology for one year before transferring to Harvard Law School. He then studied law in the office of his uncle, Benjamin Butler, until his admission to the bar in 1891. He formed a partnership with his brother, Fisher H. Pearson.

== Politics ==
Pearson was an active member of the Democratic Party who served two years as chairman of the Lowell Democratic committee and was a member of the Democratic state central committee. In 1894, based on the recommendation of Congressman Moses T. Stevens, president Grover Cleveland appointed the 24-year old Pearson to the position of Lowell postmaster. He resigned his commission in 1898 to fight in the Spanish–American War. In 1900, Pearson was a member of the Lowell board of aldermen.

== Military ==
Pearson began his military career in 1898 with the 6th Massachusetts Volunteer Infantry Regiment. He held the rank of sergeant and lieutenant during the Spanish–American War. In 1911, Pearson, then a captain in the Massachusetts Volunteer Militia, was appointed Adjutant General of Massachusetts by Governor Eugene Foss. In 1912, the Massachusetts General Court created a five-year term of office for the position of Adjutant General, which would allow Pearson to stay in office until 1917. The law was challenged by Foss' successor, David I. Walsh, but it was upheld by the Massachusetts Supreme Judicial Court. In 1914, the state legislature eliminated the term of office and Walsh removed Pearson and retired him with the rank of brigadier general. In 1916, Governor Samuel W. McCall removed Pearson's successor, Charles H. Cole, and appointed Pearson to replace him. In 1917, with the United States' entry to World War I looming, McCall sought to make the business and military sides of the Massachusetts National Guard distinct. On March 15, 1917, Pearson resigned as Adjutant General to become the chairman of the Governor's Military Council, which allowed him to rid himself of the administrative duties of Adjutant General and focus on military issues.

== Return to elected office ==
Pearson was a member of the Lowell school board in 1919. From 1920 to 1923, Pearson, now a Republican, represented the 7th Middlesex district in the Massachusetts Senate. In 1922 he was an unsuccessful candidate for Middlesex County district attorney. However, the winner of the race, Arthur Kenneth Reading, made Pearson his top assistant. Pearson left the DA's office in 1924 to return to private practice. Pearson continued to practice law until his death on June 23, 1953.
