= John H. Sherburne =

U.S. Army major general

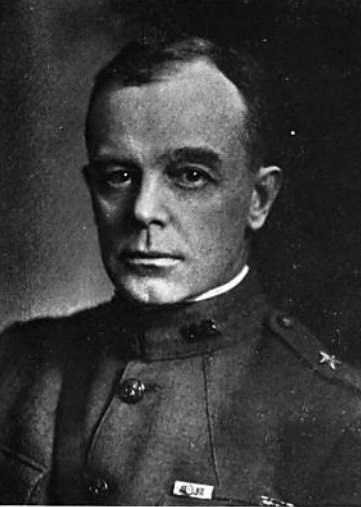
- From the 1926 edition of The National Cyclopedia of American Biography
- Born: January 29, 1877; Boston, Massachusetts, U.S.
- Died: July 25, 1959 (aged 82); Boston, Massachusetts, U.S.
- Burial place: Mount Auburn Cemetery, Cambridge, Massachusetts, U.S.
- Alma mater: Harvard College (A.B., 1899); Harvard Law School (LL.B., 1901)
- Spouse: Mary Patterson Harris (m. 1901–1945)
- Children: 4
- Military career
- Service: United States Army; Massachusetts National Guard; Organized Reserve Corps
- Service years: 1896–1948
- Rank: Brigadier General
- Service number: 0156904
- Unit: U.S. Army Field Artillery Branch
- Commands: Battery A, Massachusetts Volunteer Militia; 1st Battalion, 1st Massachusetts Field Artillery Regiment; 1st Massachusetts Field Artillery Regiment; 101st Field Artillery Regiment; 167th Field Artillery Brigade; 51st Field Artillery Brigade; 1st Massachusetts Field Artillery Brigade; 169th Field Artillery Brigade; Adjutant General of Massachusetts
- Wars: Pancho Villa Expedition; World War I World War II
- Awards: Silver Star; Purple Heart; Legion of Honor (Commander) (France); Order of the Black Star (Commander) (France)
- Other work: Attorney

Member of the Massachusetts House of Representatives for the 2nd Norfolk District
- In office 1912–1917
- Preceded by: Joseph Walker/Norman H. White
- Succeeded by: George S. Baldwin

John H. Sherburne (January 29, 1877 – July 25, 1959) was an attorney, politician, and military officer from Boston. A graduate of Harvard College (1899) and Harvard Law School (1901), he practiced as the senior partner of a prominent Boston firm. A Republican, he served in the Massachusetts House of Representatives from 1911 to 1917. A military veteran of more than 50 years, Sherburne served during the Pancho Villa Expedition, World War I, and World War II and attained the rank of brigadier general. He commanded several Field Artillery units during the First World War and was the Adjutant General of Massachusetts during the second. Sherburne was a recipient of numerous military awards, including the Silver Star, Purple Heart, French Legion of Honor (Commander), and French Order of the Black Star (Commander).

A native of Boston, Sherburne graduated from Harvard College in 1899 and Harvard Law School in 1901. Sherburne practiced law in Boston throughout his career, and became the senior partner of a well-known law firm. Active in politics as a Republican, he served in the Massachusetts House of Representatives from 1911 to 1917. In 1896, he joined a Massachusetts Militia battery as a private, and he served for 10 years before obtaining his commission. Sherburne went on to command batteries, battalions, and regiments as he advanced through the ranks, including service on the Texas-Mexico border during the Pancho Villa Expedition.

During World War I, Sherburne was promoted to brigadier general and commanded first the 167th Field Artillery Brigade, a unit of the 92nd Division, then the 51st Field Artillery Brigade, a unit of the 26th Division. After the war, Sherburne commanded the 169th Field Artillery Brigade, a unit of the Organized Reserve Corps' 94th Division. During World War II, Sherburne served as Adjutant General of Massachusetts. After the war, he was an inactive member of the Organized Reserve Corps until retiring in 1948.

In retirement, Sherburne resided in Brookline. He died in Boston on July 25, 1959. Sherburne was buried at Mount Auburn Cemetery in Cambridge.

== Early life ==
John Henry Sherburne (Note: Sherburne was usually referred to as John H. Sherburne, Jr. to distinguish him from his father, who was born in 1845 and died in 1910. Sherburne's grandfather of the same name was born in 1815 and died in 1849. His great-grandfather, also John Henry Sherburne, was born in 1794 and died in 1852. Sherburne's son, also called John Henry Sherburne, was born in 1902 and died in 1934.) was born in Boston on January 29, 1877, the son of John H. Sherburne (1845–1910) and Elizabeth Thayer (Nye) Sherburne. The senior Sherburne was an American Civil War veteran of the United States Navy and United States Marine Corps, who later practiced law and served in the Massachusetts House of Representatives and Massachusetts Senate.

The younger Sherburne attended Hopkinson's School, a private academy in Boston. He began attendance at Harvard College in 1895, and graduated with a A.B. degree in 1899. Sherburne was then a student at Harvard Law School, from which he received his LL.B. in 1901. He was admitted to the bar later that year and began to practice in Boston.

== Start of career ==
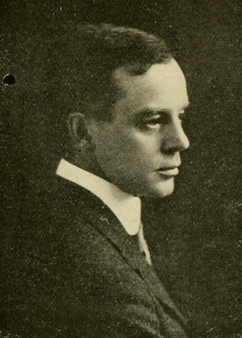
Sherburne as a member of the Massachusetts House of Representatives in 1915

As Sherburne advanced in the legal profession, he rose to become the senior partner in the Boston firm of Sherburne, Powers & Needham. In March 1896, he began his military career when he enlisted as a private in Battery A, Massachusetts Volunteer Militia. Sherburne was promoted to lance corporal in January 1899, corporal in May 1899, sergeant in May 1902, and first sergeant in January 1905.

In February 1906, Sherburne received his commission as a first lieutenant and continued to serve with Battery A. He was promoted to captain in October 1908 and was assigned to command the battery. In January 1913, Sherburne was promoted to major as commander of the Massachusetts National Guard's 1st Field Artillery Battalion, a unit of the 1st Massachusetts Field Artillery Regiment. He was promoted to colonel in March 1916 and assigned as the regiment's commander. From June to October 1916, the 1st Field Artillery was called to federal service for duty on the Texas-Mexico border during the Pancho Villa Expedition.

A Republican, Sherburne served in the Massachusetts House of Representatives from 1912 to 1917. In addition, he was a delegate to local, state, and national party conventions throughout his life.

== Continued career ==
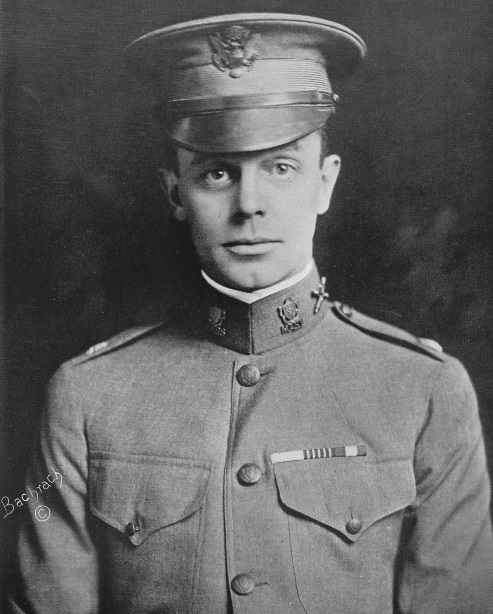
Sherburne circa 1916, when he was a major commanding 1st Battalion, 1st Massachusetts Field Artillery Regiment

In July 1917, Sherburne was activated for federal service during World War I and assigned to command the 1st Massachusetts Field Artillery, now redesignated the 101st Field Artillery Regiment. He commanded the regiment until June 1918, when he was promoted to brigadier general as commander of the 167th Field Artillery Brigade, a unit of the racially segregated 92nd Division. He ended the war as commander of the 51st Field Artillery Brigade, part of the 26th Division. Sherburne's First World War included the Silver Star and Purple Heart from the United States. In addition, he received the Legion of Honor (Commander) and Order of the Black Star (Commander) from France.

After the war, Sherburne testified to Congress when it investigated army attacks that took place on November 11, 1918, just hours before the Armistice of 11 November 1918 ended the war. In his view, there was no military necessity to justify the attacks, and the casualties that resulted were unnecessary. Various officers in the chain of command provided conflicting explanations for why the attacks took place, but no one was reprimanded or punished.

Following his World War I service, Sherburne advocated for civil rights for African Americans, including support for anti-lynching laws in New York. From 1926 to 1931, he served on the board of trustees for Howard University, the historically black college in Washington, D.C. In 1928 he resigned from the Forty and Eight veterans' organization over a clause in its constitution that barred black veterans. In 1938, a widely published article on Nazi Germany's use of the Swastika quoted Sherburne's recollection of his World War I brigade using it because of its ancient association with good luck. The article also included a testimonial from Sherburne regarding the abilities of the black soldiers he led during the war, whom he judged to be excellent in all respects.

== Later career ==
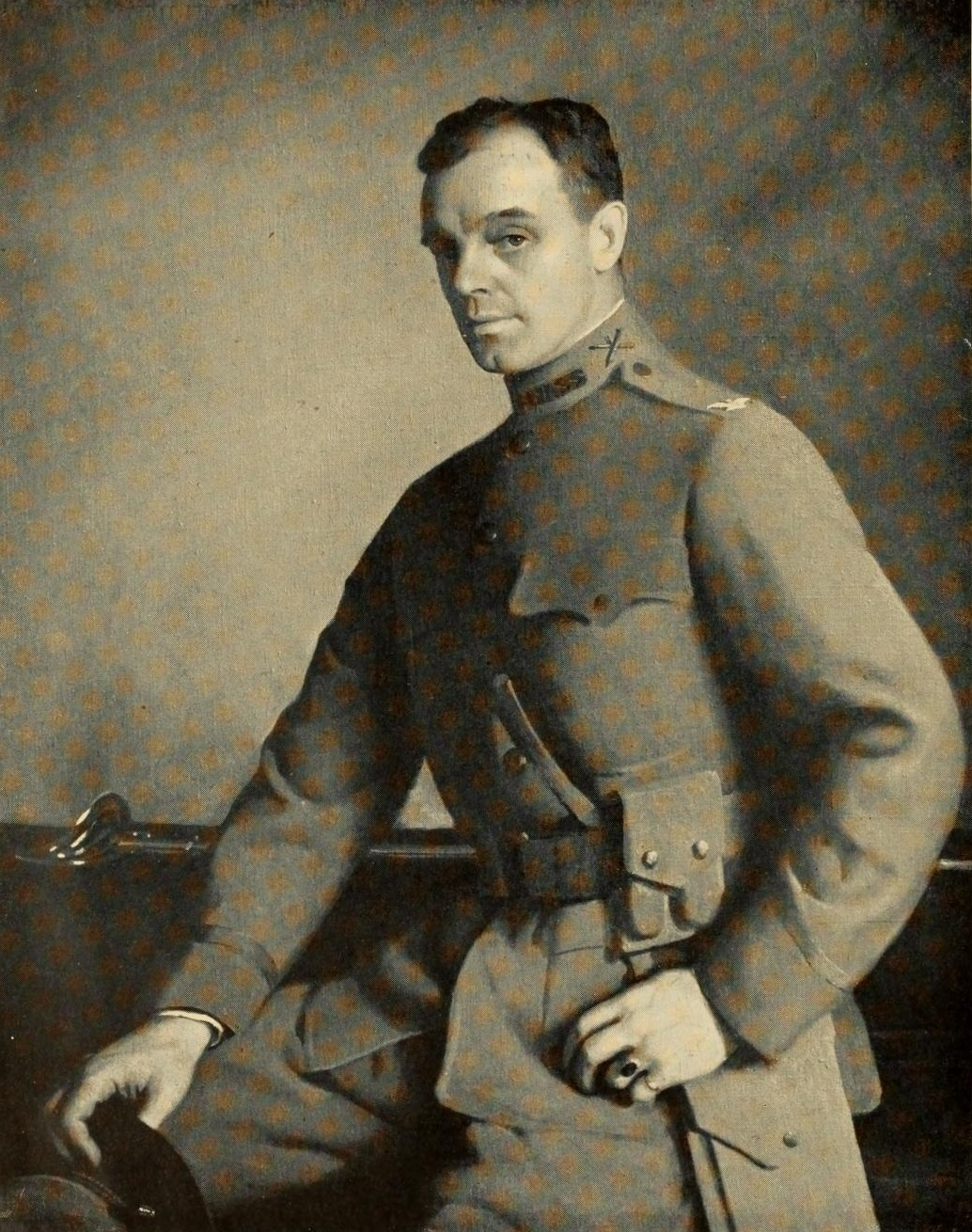
Sherburne as a colonel commanding the 101st Field Artillery in 1917.

After returning to the United States, Sherburne was appointed federal Food Administrator for Massachusetts, and he served until 1920. As the army reorganized following the war, Sherburne was commissioned as a brigadier general and assigned to command the 1st Massachusetts Field Artillery Brigade. He was subsequently commissioned as a brigadier general in the Organized Reserve Corps and assigned to command the 169th Field Artillery Brigade, a unit of the 94th Division. Sherburne remained in this position until 1938. In 1924, he was chairman of the Commission on the Revision of Massachusetts Highway Laws. In 1928, he was an unsuccessful candidate for the Republican nomination for lieutenant governor. Sherburne was president of the Massachusetts Safety Council from 1930 to 1940, and continued to serve in the Reserve after completing his brigade command.

From July 1942 to April 1943, Sherburne served as Adjutant General of Massachusetts, responsible for both training and readiness of National Guard troops activated for wartime service and the organization and operations of the Massachusetts State Defense Force, which carried out the National Guard's state duties during the war. After resigning as adjutant general, Sherburne continued to serve as an inactive reservist until 1948.

== Retirement and death ==
In retirement, Sherburne was a resident of Brookline. He died at the veterans' hospital in Jamaica Plain, Boston on July 25, 1959. Sherburne was buried at Mount Auburn Cemetery in Cambridge.

== Family ==
In November 1901, Sherburne married Mary Patterson Harris of Baltimore. They were the parents of four children, one son and three daughters. The Sherburnes divorced in September 1931, and in November he married Helen Kemp Stark, who was divorced from electric company executive Paul G. Stark of Indianapolis.

== Notes ==
Military offices
Preceded by Edgar C. Erickson	Adjutant General of Massachusetts; 1942–1943	Succeeded by William J. Keville
Massachusetts House of Representatives
Preceded by Joseph Walker/Norman H. White	Member of the Massachusetts House of Representatives for the 2nd Norfolk District; 1912 — 1917	Succeeded by George S. Baldwin
