= Patrick J. Duane =

Irish-American politician in Massachusetts

Mayor of Waltham, Massachusetts
- In office 1930–1934
- Preceded by: Henry W. Beal
- Succeeded by: Frederick L. MacDonald
- In office 1912–1914
- Preceded by: Edward A. Walker
- Succeeded by: Thomas K. Keans

Acting United States Marshal for the District of Massachusetts
- In office 1920–1921
- Preceded by: John Joseph Mitchell
- Succeeded by: William J. Keville

Personal details
- Born: August 18, 1862 Doneraile, County Cork, Ireland
- Died: May 30, 1949 (aged 86) Waltham, Massachusetts, U.S.
- Resting place: Calvary Cemetery; Waltham, Massachusetts
- Party: Democratic Party
- Occupation: Machinst; Attorney

Patrick J. Duane (August 18, 1862 – May 30, 1949) was an Irish-born American politician who served as mayor of Waltham, Massachusetts from 1912 to 1914 and again from 1930 to 1934.

== Early life ==
Duane was born on August 18, 1862, in Doneraile, County Cork, Ireland. He was six children from his father's second marriage and one of 18 total children fathered by him. When Duane was two his family moved to the United States. After residing in Saxonville, Massachusetts for a year, the family moved to Waltham. Duane left school at the age of ten to go to work. He was a bobbin boy in a cotton mill for about a year then worked for the American Watch Tool Company for around another year. He then moved to Thomaston, Connecticut to work as a machinist for the Seth Thomas Clock Company. In 1885 he married Bessie Wallis of Waltham. After residing in Baltimore for a time, the couple returned to Waltham, where Duane worked for the Waltham Watch Company. After eight years as a machinist for Waltham Watch, Duane was made a job master in the flat steel department. During this time, Duane took correspondence courses and passed the bar exam in 1902. His finances prevented him from leaving the factory, but Waltham Watch would allow him to leave work whenever he was able to secure a case. After two years under this arrangement, Duane was able to build up enough of a practice to go into law full-time.

== Politics ==
Duane was an active member of the Democratic Party. He was a Gold Democrat who split with the party during the 1896 presidential election but would back the party in future elections.

Duane represented Ward 4 on the Waltham city council in 1894 and 1895. From 1898 to 1901 he was an overseer of the poor. He was the Democratic nominee for mayor in 1900 but lost to Mahlon R. Leonard by 850 votes. From 1906 to 1909 he was a member of the Massachusetts House of Representatives. He was an unsuccessful candidate for mayor again in 1909 and 1910, losing the later election by only 16 votes. In 1911 he was elected to his first term as mayor. He was reelected in 1912.

From 1916 to 1920, Duane was the chief deputy United States Marshal for Massachusetts. He became acting United States Marshal in 1920 after John Joseph Mitchell became the district's collector of internal revenue and later that year arrested Charles Ponzi.

In 1929, Duane sought to return to his former position as mayor. He faced seven-year incumbent Henry F. Beal, whose family had held the office for the past 11 years (Beal succeeded his brother, George, who held the office for four years before Beal was elected). Beal was initially declared the winner by one vote, however, a recount gave Duane the victory by 13 votes. He was reelected in 1931.

In 1934, Duane was made a special justice of the Waltham district court by Governor Joseph B. Ely.

Duane backed Republican Gaspar G. Bacon over Democrat James Michael Curley in the 1934 Massachusetts gubernatorial election. In the 1938 gubernatorial election he endorsed Leverett Saltonstall over Curley.

== Personal life ==
Duane was the father of four sons and a daughter. His first wife, Bessie, died in 1908. Duane died on May 30, 1949, in Waltham. He was survived by his second wife and five children.
