= George Ashe =

George Ashe or Ash may refer to:

- George Ash (Australian politician) (1859–1897), newspaper editor, lawyer and parliamentarian in colonial South Australia
- George Ashe (Canadian politician) (1932–2014)
- George T. Ashe (1905–1975), American politician

== See also ==
- Saint-George Ashe (1871–1922), British rower
- St George Ashe (1658–1718), Church of Ireland cleric
