= William Henry Carter =

American politician (1864-1955)

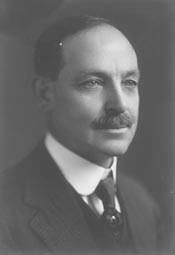

Member of the U.S. House of Representatives from Massachusetts's 13th district
- In office March 4, 1915 – March 3, 1919
- Preceded by: John Joseph Mitchell
- Succeeded by: Robert Luce

Massachusetts House of Representatives
- In office 1906–1906

Personal details
- Born: June 15, 1864 Needham Heights, Massachusetts, U.S.
- Died: April 23, 1955 (aged 90) Needham, Massachusetts, U.S.
- Party: Republican
- Parent: William Carter (father)
- Education: Comers Commercial College
- Profession: knit-underwear manufacturing

William Henry Carter (June 15, 1864 – April 23, 1955) was a U.S. representative from Massachusetts.

Born at Needham Heights, Massachusetts, Carter attended public schools. He graduated from Comers Commercial College, Boston, Massachusetts. He worked in several capacities at the knit-underwear manufacturing plant of the William Carter Co. He served as a member of the Massachusetts House of Representatives in 1906 and of the Republican State committee in 1907 and 1908.

Carter was elected as a Republican to the Sixty-fourth and Sixty-fifth Congresses (March 4, 1915 – March 3, 1919). He was not a candidate for reelection in 1918. He was interested in real-estate development. He was elected president of the William Carter Company in 1918 and continued manufacturing activities until his death. He died in Needham, Massachusetts, April 23, 1955. He was interred in Needham Cemetery.
