= Adjutant General of Massachusetts =

Highest-ranking military official in Massachusetts, US

Adjutant General of the Commonwealth of Massachusetts
- Flag of the Commonwealth of Massachusetts
- Incumbent; Major General Gary W. Keefe since May 2016
- Website: Massachusetts National Guard: The Adjutant General

The Adjutant General of Massachusetts is the highest-ranking military official in the Commonwealth of Massachusetts and is subordinate to the Governor of Massachusetts. The Adjutant General advises the Governor on military and emergency management matters.

== Duties ==
The Adjutant General is the principal military advisor to the Governor and is also responsible for the organization, training and supervision of the Massachusetts National Guard and the Massachusetts State Defense Force.

== List of Adjutants General of the Commonwealth of Massachusetts ==
Term	Name
13 Mar 1778 – 2 Mar 1782	Peleg Wadsworth
2 Mar 1782 – 11 Dec 1785	Ebenezer Bridge
11 Dec 1785 – 3 Apr 1788	Israel Keith
3 Apr 1788 – 15 Feb 1813	William Donnison
22 Feb 1813 – 1 Jun 1816	John Brooks
17 Jun 1816 – 9 Jan 1818	Ebenezer Mattoon
3 Feb – 12 Jun 1818	Fitch Hall
12 Jun 1818 – 5 Feb 1835	William H. Sumner
5 Feb 1835 – 6 Mar 1843	Henry Alexander Scammell Dearborn
16 Mar 1843 – 17 Mar 1844	Joseph E. Boyd
22 Mar 1844 – 15 Jan 1848	Henry K. Oliver
15 Jan 1848 – 6 May 1851	George H. Devereaux
6 May 1851 – 2 Apr 1860	Ebenezer W. Stone
2 Apr 1860 – 17 Dec 1866	William Schouler
17 Dec 1866 – 14 Jan 1879	James A. Cunningham
14 Jan 1879 – 4 Jan 1883	A. Hun Berry
4 Jan 1883 – 5 Jan 1905	Samuel Dalton
5 Jan 1905 – 4 Jan 1906	William Stopford
4 Jan 1906 – 15 Mar 1907	James A. Frye
15 Mar 1907 – 1 Jan 1908	James P. Parker
1 Jan 1908 – 5 Jan 1911	William H. Brigham
5 Jan 1911 – 1 May 1914	Gardner W. Pearson
2–27 May 1914	William S. Simmons (acting)
28 May 1914 – 5 Aug 1916	Charles H. Cole
6 Aug 1916 – 16 Mar 1917	Gardner W. Pearson
17 Mar – 24 Jul 1917	E. Leroy Sweetser (acting)
25 Jul 1917 – 8 Jan 1931	Jesse F. Stevens
9 Jan 1931 – 2 Jan 1935	John H. Agnew
3 Jan 1935 – 6 Jan 1937	William I. Rose
7 Jan 1937 – 4 Jan 1939	Charles H. Cole
5 Jan 1939 – 30 Jun 1942	Edgar C. Erickson
1 Jul 1942 – 12 Apr 1943	John H. Sherburne
13 Apr 1943 – 7 May 1946	William J. Keville
7 May 1946 – 5 Jan 1961	William H. Harrison, Jr.
5 Jan 1961 – 9 Dec 1964	Thomas J. Donnelly
9 Dec 1964 – 19 Dec 1969	Joseph M. Ambrose
19 Dec 1969 – 4 Jul 1972	Timothy J. Regan, Jr.
4 Jul 1972 – 13 Dec 1982	Vahan Vartanian
13 Dec 1982 – 19 Nov 1987	Anthony C. Spadorcia
19 Nov 1987 – 19 Nov 1993	Wayne F. Wagner
19 Nov 1993 – 24 Jul 1999	Raymond A. Vezina
24 Jul 1999 – 11 Jan 2000	George W. Keefe (ANG) (acting)
11 Jan 2000 – 22 Apr 2005	George W. Keefe (ANG)
22 Apr 2005 – 21 Sep 2007	Oliver J. Mason, Jr.
21 Sep 2007 – 25 Aug 2012	Joseph C. Carter
25 Aug 2012 – 5 May 2016	L. Scott Rice (ANG)
5 May 2016 – present	Gary W. Keefe (ANG)

== See also ==
- Massachusetts National Guard
