= William I. Rose (United States Army officer) =

United States Army general

William I. Rose (September 8, 1898 – June 9, 1954) was an American military officer who served as Adjutant General of Massachusetts and was commander of the 26th Infantry Division.

== Early life ==
Rose was born on September 8, 1898, in Worcester, Massachusetts. He attended Worcester public schools and the College of the Holy Cross. He enlisted in the Massachusetts National Guard on June 16, 1916, and served with the Emmet Guards on the Mexican border.

== World War I ==
Rose's company was called into active service during World War I. He served in France, where he rose to the rank of sergeant. Rose was then recommended for officers training school and commissioned a lieutenant. He commanded Co. G, 358th Infantry Regiment, 90th Infantry Division, which was made up of soldiers from Texas and Oklahoma. He led troops during the Meuse-Argonne Offensive and saw action in five major engagements. He received an honorable discharge on July 2, 1919.

== Post-war years ==
On July 9, 1920, Rose returned to the Emmet Guards as a first lieutenant. He was promoted to Captain on April 13, 1921, and Major on February 18, 1932. In December 1934, he was promoted to lieutenant colonel and transferred to the staff of 26th Infantry Division commander Daniel Needham. On December 15, 1934, he was appointed Adjutant General by Governor-elect James Michael Curley. In this role, Rose oversaw deployment of guard forces during floods in the spring of 1936. He also oversaw many Works Progress Administration activities, including the construction of a new Guard facility on Cape Cod. He served as Adjutant General until January 7, 1937, when Curley made him commander of the 26th Infantry Division's 51st Infantry Brigade. His appointment with the 51st was controversial, as he jumped over several officers with higher rank and more years of service. He was promoted to brigadier general shortly thereafter.

Outside of the Guard, Rose was the business manager of the Massachusetts Department of Mental Health and purchasing agent for the City of Boston.

== World War II ==
On January 16, 1941, the 26th Infantry Division was called into federal service. After the attack on Pearl Harbor, Rose was placed in command of Task Force 6814 and the 26th Infantry Division. Command of the task force passed to Major General Alexander Patch when it arrived in Naval Base Noumea in New Caledonia and Rose was assigned to defend the islands of Effate and Espiritu Santo. Rose also organized defenses and constructed advance air bases on the New Hebrides and Russell Islands.

== Later life ==
Rose was separated from active duty on February 25, 1946. On September 9, 1946, he returned to the Massachusetts National Guard and was named commander of the 26th Infantry Division. He retired with the rank of Major General on September 8, 1951, due to a state law that required separation after five years as a division commander.

Rose died on June 9, 1954, at Quigley Memorial Hospital in Chelsea, Massachusetts, and was buried in St. John's Cemetery in Worcester.

Military offices
Preceded by Post activated	Commanding General, 26th Infantry Division; 1946–1951	Succeeded by Edward Sirois
Preceded by John H. Agnew	Adjutant General of Massachusetts; 1935–1937	Succeeded by Charles H. Cole
