= Thomas J. Hannon =

American politician

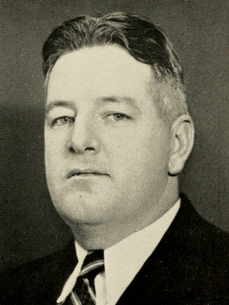
- Hannon circa 1935

Member of the Massachusetts House of Representatives for the 12th Suffolk District
- In office 1955–1957
- Preceded by: Philip A. Chapman
- Succeeded by: Robert H. Quinn

President of the Boston City Council
- In office 1948–1948
- Preceded by: John B. Kelly
- Succeeded by: William F. Hurley
- In office 1943–1943
- Preceded by: Thomas E. Linehan
- Succeeded by: John E. Kerrigan

Member of the Boston City Council for Ward 13
- In office 1942–1952
- Preceded by: Edward A. Hutchinson Jr.
- Succeeded by: District eliminated

Member of the Massachusetts House of Representatives for the 13th Suffolk District
- In office 1935–1941
- Preceded by: John V. Mahoney
- Succeeded by: Gerald F. Scally

Personal details
- Born: December 9, 1900 Dorchester, Massachusetts, US
- Died: June 27, 1983 (aged 82) Hyannis, Massachusetts, US
- Resting place: Ancient Cemetery, Yarmouth, Massachusetts
- Party: Democratic
- Spouse: Mary MacInnis (1948–1983; his death)
- Education: Canisius College; Catholic University; Northeastern University School of Law
- Occupation: Lawyer

Thomas Joseph Hannon (December 9, 1900 – June 27, 1983) was an American politician who served as a member of the Massachusetts House of Representatives from 1935 to 1941 and from 1955 to 1957 and the Boston City Council from 1942 to 1952.

== Early life ==
Hannon was born on December 9, 1900, in Boston. He grew up in the Uphams Corner neighborhood of Dorchester. As a young man, Hannon worked as a longshoreman and for the Boston Department of Public Works to help support his family. He graduated from The English High School and studied at the Oblate Seminary in Tewksbury, Massachusetts. He decided to pursue a legal career rather than the priesthood and graduated from Canisius College, Catholic University, and the Northeastern University School of Law. He was admitted to the bar in 1928 and started a practice with his brother Edwin F. Hannon.

== Political career ==
Hannon was elected to the Massachusetts House of Representatives in 1934. In 1938 he was a candidate for Democratic floor leader. He lost to John F. Aspell 64 votes to 24 (a third candidate, John P. White, received 2 votes). In 1940, Hannon ran for the 4th Suffolk District seat in the Massachusetts Senate, but lost to fellow representative Leo J. Sullivan by 83 votes.

In 1941, Hannon was elected to represent Ward 13 on the Boston City Council. In 1943 he succeeded in having a playground in his neighborhood named after his mother, Mary A. Hannon. He served as Council president in 1943 and 1948. During his second term as president Hannon implemented new rules to speed up council business and increase decorum. In 1951, the Boston City Council switched from a body consisting of 22 ward members to a nine-member board elected at-large. He finished 19th in the 65-candidate preliminary election, which kept him off the general election ballot. Hannon ran again in 1953 and finished 15th in the general election.

In 1955, Hannon returned to the Massachusetts House of Representatives. In 1956 lost his bid for renomination to future Speaker of the Massachusetts House of Representatives and Massachusetts Attorney General Robert H. Quinn by 17 votes.

== Later life ==
Hannon continued to practice law until his retirement in 1978. He spent his later years in Hyannis, Massachusetts. He died on June 27, 1983, at Cape Cod Hospital.

== See also ==
- 1935-1936 Massachusetts legislature
- 1937-1938 Massachusetts legislature
- 1939 Massachusetts legislature
- 1955-1956 Massachusetts legislature
- Massachusetts House of Representatives' 12th Suffolk district
- Massachusetts House of Representatives' 13th Suffolk district
