= William Schouler =

American politician (1814–1872)

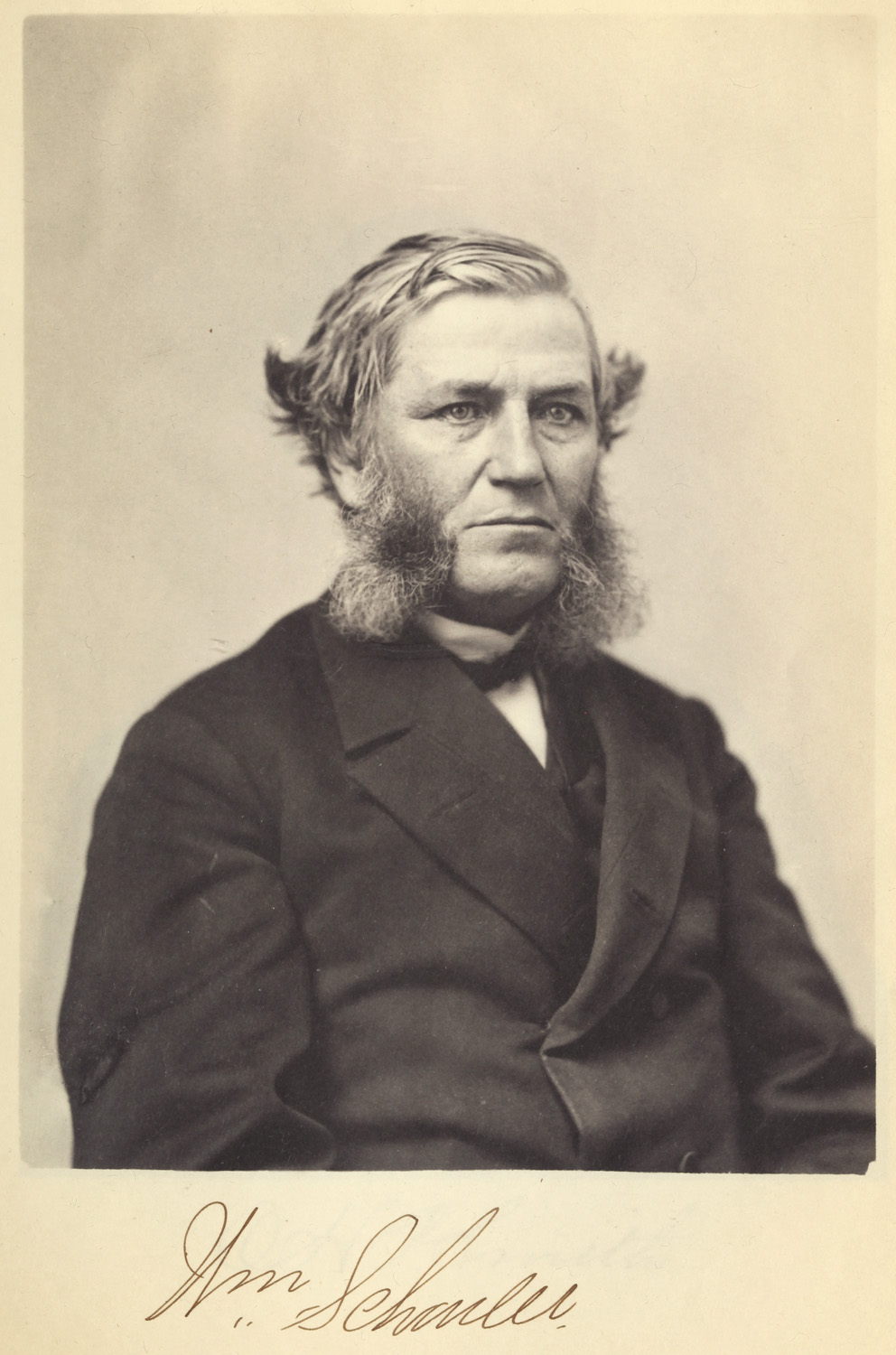
- Schouler in 1868

Member of the Massachusetts Senate from the First Essex district
- In office 1868–1868
- Preceded by: George H. Sweetser
- Succeeded by: George H. Sweetser

Personal details
- Born: December 31, 1814 Kilbarchan, Scotland
- Died: October 24, 1872 (aged 57) Jamaica Plain, Boston Massachusetts, US
- Occupation: Journalist, politician

William Schouler (December 31, 1814 – October 24, 1872) was a Scottish-born American journalist, politician and Adjutant General of Massachusetts during the American Civil War.

== Early life ==
Schouler was born on December 31, 1814, in Kilbarchan. He immigrated to the United States as a young child. His father had set up a silk print-works establishment on Staten Island and later established a similar business in Arlington, Massachusetts, where Schouler spent most of his childhood.

== Journalism and politician ==
In 1842, Schouler became the owner and editor of the Lowell Courier for the next six years. From 1844 to 1847 he served a Whig member of the Massachusetts House of Representatives from Lowell. In 1845, Schouler headed a commission that investigated mill conditions in Lowell and recommended against a proposal to shorten the work day to ten hours. The uproar over Schouler's position, led in part by women mill workers in Lowell, contributed to his defeat in the fall 1846 election.

Schouler moved to Boston in 1847, where he became editor and part-owner of the Boston Atlas. In 1848 he was elected to the state legislature as a Whig member from Boston, serving from 1849 to 1852. He was also a delegate in the Massachusetts Constitutional Convention of 1853, where he helped lead the opposition to the proposed new state constitution. In the course of the debate, he expressed the view that corporations were merely devices for people to avoid paying debts.

Later in 1853, Schouler moved to Ohio. He became the editor for the Cincinnati Gazette and in 1856 the Ohio State Journal, where he was active in the early organization of the Ohio Republican Party. In March 1858 he was appointed Adjutant General of Ohio by Governor Salmon P. Chase.

== Military, politics and later life ==
In 1858, Schouler moved back to Boston to serve as editor of the Boston Atlas and Bee. In 1860 Governor Nathaniel Banks appointed him Adjutant General of Massachusetts. In 1861, a Massachusetts militia training camp was named for him, but later renamed for Secretary of War Edwin Stanton.

In 1864, Schouler brought attention to Lydia Bixby, a Boston widow who lost several sons in the war; this led Abraham Lincoln to write a moving letter of condolence to her. He remained Adjutant General throughout all of the U.S. Civil War until 1867.

Schouler later served one term in the Massachusetts State Senate. He also wrote the two volume History of Massachusetts in the Civil War.

Schouler died on October 24, 1872, aged 57, at his home in Jamaica Plain.

== See also ==
- 89th Massachusetts General Court (1868)

Military offices
Preceded by Ebenezer W. Stone	Adjutant General of Massachusetts; 1860 - 1867	Succeeded by James A. Cunningham
