= Joseph Cushing Edmands =

Union soldier during the American Civil War (1842–1878)

- Born: March 26, 1842; Boston, Massachusetts
- Died: December 28, 1878 (aged 36); Boston, Massachusetts
- Burial place: Mount Auburn Cemetery
- Military career
- Allegiance: (United States) Union
- Branch: Union Army
- Service years: 1861 – 1865
- Rank: Colonel; Brevet Brigadier General
- Unit: 24th Massachusetts Infantry
- Commands: 32nd Massachusetts Infantry; 3rd Brigade, 1st Division, V Corps
- Conflicts: American Civil War

Joseph Cushing Edmands (March 26, 1842 – December 28, 1878) was a volunteer soldier in the Union Army during the American Civil War who attained the grade of colonel and in 1866 was awarded the honorary grade of brevet brigadier general.

== Early career ==
Edmands was born to J. Wiley Edmands and Rebecca Cushing Edmands in Boston, Massachusetts. His father served briefly as a U.S. Congressman during the 1850s. Prior to the Civil War, Edmands served as a private and clerk with the 4th Massachusetts Militia Regiment. When the Civil War began, Edmands was living in Newton, Massachusetts.

== Civil War service ==
On October 4, 1861, at the age of 19, Edmands enlisted with the 24th Regiment Massachusetts Volunteer Infantry as a first sergeant. The regiment reached Annapolis, Maryland, in December 1861 and was soon assigned to Brig. Gen. Ambrose Burnside's North Carolina Expedition. Edmands may have taken part in the first two battles of the expedition, the Battle of Roanoke Island and the Battle of New Bern in early 1862. The extent of his involvement is unclear because he was seriously ill for much of the spring of 1862. In the summer of 1862, he was sent home on invalid furlough due to his illness. After his recovery, he began to recruit a new company of volunteers in Boston.

This company became Company K of the 32nd Regiment Massachusetts Volunteer Infantry in September 1862.

On December 29, 1862, Edmands was promoted to major.

Shortly after the Army of the Potomac went into winter quarters, Edmands was captured by Confederates on December 16, 1863, in the vicinity of Bealeton, Virginia. He was taken to Libby Prison in Richmond, Virginia, where he remained for three months until he was paroled on March 7, 1864.

Edmands rejoined the 32nd Massachusetts in May 1864 and in June was appointed to the command of the regiment. He accordingly received a promotion to colonel on June 30, 1864.

Edmands was mustered out of the army on July 1, 1865. On January 13, 1866, President Andrew Johnson nominated Edmands for the award of the honorary grade of brevet brigadier general of volunteers, to rank from March 13, 1865, and the U.S. Senate confirmed the award on March 12, 1866.

== See also ==
- List of Massachusetts generals in the American Civil War
- Massachusetts in the American Civil War
