= 32nd Massachusetts Infantry Regiment =

32nd Regiment Massachusetts Volunteer Infantry
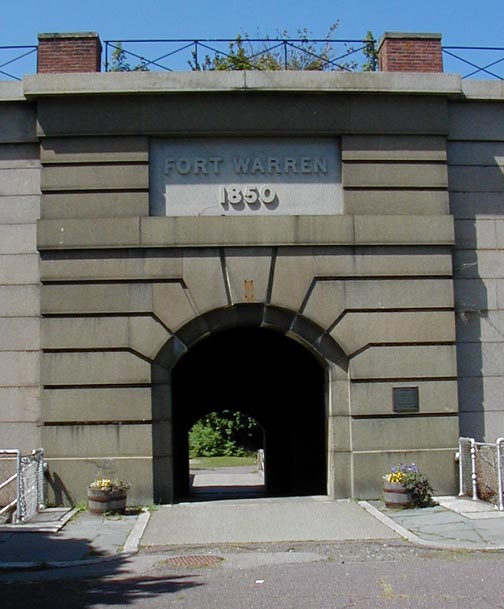
- Fort Warren in Boston harbor where the original companies of the 32nd Massachusetts, known as the "Fort Warren Battalion," first served.
- Active: June 1862 – July 11, 1865
- Country: United States of America
- Allegiance: Union
- Branch: Union Army
- Type: Infantry
- Size: 2,418
- Part of: In 1863: 2nd Brigade (Sweitzer's), 1st Division (Barnes's), V Corps, Army of the Potomac

Commanders
- Notable commanders: Col. George L. Prescott; Col. Joseph Cushing Edmands; Lt. Col. Luther Stephenson; Lt. Col. James A. Cunningham

Insignia
- V Corps (1st Division) badge

The 32nd Regiment Massachusetts Volunteer Infantry was an infantry regiment in the Union army during the American Civil War. The nucleus of the regiment was a battalion of six companies raised in September 1861 to garrison Fort Warren, the largest fortification in Boston harbor. The battalion was originally known as the 1st Battalion Massachusetts Infantry or the Fort Warren Battalion.

The unit was transferred to the battle front following Abraham Lincoln's urgent call for troops in response to the Confederate advance on Washington during Jackson's Valley Campaign in May 1862. The Fort Warren Battalion arrived in Northern Virginia in June 1862 and, though it did not yet have a complete regimental roster of 10 companies, it then became known as the 32nd Regiment Massachusetts Infantry. In July 1862, the 32nd was assigned to the Army of the Potomac and was shipped to Fortress Monroe to join its new command at the close of the unsuccessful Peninsular Campaign. During the summer of 1862, four more companies were added to the unit and by September 3, 1862, the 32nd had a full regimental roster.

The regiment took part in 30 battles overall including the Second Battle of Bull Run, the Battle of Antietam, the Battle of Fredericksburg, the Battle of Gettysburg, and numerous engagements during the Overland Campaign and the Siege of Petersburg. In the Overland Campaign, during the Battle of Spotsylvania Court House, the unit was heavily engaged and suffered 54 percent casualties—its worst casualties of the war.

The composition of the 32nd Massachusetts was unusual in that it was continually replenished, during the latter months of the war, by men from disbanded regiments who had reenlisted for a second term of service. In all, remnants of seven different regiments were consolidated with the 32nd including the 9th, 12th, 13th, 18th, 22nd, and 39th Massachusetts Infantries. After the Confederate surrender, the 32nd Massachusetts participated in the Grand Review of the Armies in Washington, D.C., then returned to Boston and was disbanded on July 11, 1865.

== See also ==
- Massachusetts in the Civil War
- List of Massachusetts Civil War units
