= John B. Kelly (Boston politician) =

American politician

President of the Boston City Council
- In office 1946–1947
- Preceded by: John E. Kerrigan
- Succeeded by: Thomas J. Hannon

Member of the Boston City Council from Ward 15
- In office 1937–1947
- Preceded by: Martin H. Tobin
- Succeeded by: Robert J. Ramsey

Personal details
- Born: June 21, 1904 Boston, Massachusetts, U.S.
- Died: August 8, 1969 (aged 65) Boston, Massachusetts, U.S.
- Party: Democratic
- Education: Carven School of Accounting

John B. Kelly (July 21, 1904 – August 8, 1969) was an American politician who served as a member of the Boston City Council from 1937 to 1947 and was the council president from 1946 to 1947.

== Early life ==
Kelly was born in Boston on July 21, 1904. He graduated from the High School of Commerce and the Carven School of Accounting. His brother, Francis E. Kelly, was also a politician and another brother, Joe Kelly, was a radio and television personality.

== Political career ==
From 1937 to 1947, Kelly represented Ward 15 on the Boston City Council. In 1946 he was elected council president with the support of Mayor James Michael Curley. As council president, Kelly served as acting Mayor while Curley was performing his congressional duties in Washington, D.C., and later when he was standing trial for fraud. On April 9, 1947, Kelly and fellow councilor Joseph M. Scannell were indicted on charges of bribe solicitation and attempted larceny. On June 10, 1947, Kelly collapsed in his City Hall office due to what his doctors described as strain from the trial and "a rheumatic disorder of long standing". The trial ended on June 12. As he was leaving the courthouse, Kelly collapsed again and was in a coma for 7 and a half hours. He was acquitted on all charges. He was released from the hospital on June 25 and presided over a council session that afternoon.

On June 26, 1947, Curley was sentenced to six to eighteen months in prison for mail fraud. The city charter allowed Kelly, as council president, to serve as acting mayor in the mayor's absence. However, his powers were limited as long as the Mayor was living. The Massachusetts General Court passed emergency legislation to bypass Kelly and grant full Mayoral powers to John Hynes, who as city clerk was second in the line of succession, until Curley's release from prison. Kelly was upset by the move and accused Governor Robert F. Bradford of defying Boston's city charter and railroading him from the office of acting mayor.

In 1947, Kelly was defeated for reelection by Robert J. Ramsey. He challenged Ramsey two years later, but was unsuccessful.

== Later life ==
After leaving office, Kelly managed of Boston's Old Harbor Housing Project and coached the Boston Park League's Francis E. Kelly Baseball Club. He died on August 8, 1969, at his home in Dorchester.
