= John Joseph Mitchell =

American politician (1873–1925)

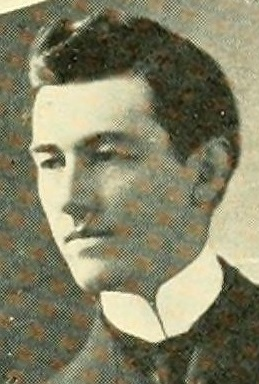
- From 1907's "Souvenir of Massachusetts Legislators".

Member of the U.S. House of Representatives from Massachusetts
- In office November 8, 1910 – March 3, 1911
- Preceded by: Charles Q. Tirrell
- Succeeded by: William Wilder
- Constituency: 4th district
- In office April 15, 1913 – March 3, 1915
- Preceded by: John W. Weeks
- Succeeded by: William Henry Carter
- Constituency: 13th district

Member of the Massachusetts Senate
- In office 1907–1908

Member of the Massachusetts House of Representatives
- In office 1903–1906

Personal details
- Born: May 9, 1873 Marlborough, Massachusetts, U.S.
- Died: September 13, 1925 (aged 52) Boston, Massachusetts, U.S.
- Resting place: Immaculate Conception Cemetery (Marlborough, Massachusetts)
- Party: Democratic
- Education: Boston College; Albany Law School

John Joseph Mitchell (May 9, 1873 – September 13, 1925) was a lawyer and politician.

== Biography ==
Mitchell was born in Marlborough, Massachusetts, on May 9, 1873. He attended public schools, Boston College, and the Albany Law School. Mitchell was admitted to the bar and commenced practice in Marlborough. He was elected a member of the Massachusetts House of Representatives, and served in the Massachusetts State Senate.

Mitchell was elected as a Democrat to the 61st United States Congress to fill the vacancy caused by the death of Charles Q. Tirrell, serving from November 8, 1910, to March 3, 1911. However, he lost a simultaneous election to the 62nd United States Congress, and therefore only served until the completion of the open term.

He was elected to the Sixty-third Congress to fill the vacancy caused by the resignation of John W. Weeks and served from April 15, 1913 to March 3, 1915. He was an unsuccessful candidate for reelection in 1914 to the Sixty-fourth Congress.

On February 5, 1915, Woodrow Wilson nominated Mitchell for the position of United States Marshal for Massachusetts. He took office on April 1, 1915. In 1920, he was appointed collector of internal revenue for the district of Massachusetts. His nomination was confirmed by the United States Senate on March 9, 1920 and he took office on April 1, 1920. He resigned in 1921 and practiced as an attorney in Boston until his death in the Brighton neighborhood of Boston on September 13, 1925. He was interred in Immaculate Conception Cemetery in Marlborough.

== See also ==
- 128th Massachusetts General Court (1907)

U.S. House of Representatives
Preceded by Charles Q. Tirrell	Member of the U.S. House of Representatives from Massachusetts's 4th congressional district November 8, 1910 – March 3, 1911	Succeeded by William H. Wilder
Preceded by John W. Weeks	Member of the U.S. House of Representatives from Massachusetts's 13th congressional district April 15, 1913 – March 3, 1915	Succeeded by William Henry Carter
Government offices
Preceded by Guy Murchie	United States Marshal for the District of Massachusetts; 1915–1920	Succeeded by Patrick J. Duane
Preceded by John F. Malley	Collector of internal revenue for the District of Massachusetts; 1920–1921	Succeeded by Malcolm Nichols
