= Thomas E. Linehan =

American judge and politician

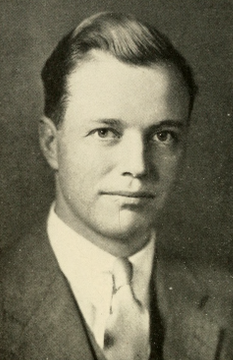

Presiding Justice of the South Boston Municipal Court
- In office 1955–1974
- Preceded by: Philip A. Chapman
- Succeeded by: Lawrence L. Cameron

Special Justice of the South Boston Municipal Court
- In office 1950–1955
- Preceded by: William J. Day
- Succeeded by: Joseph F. Feeney

President of the Boston City Council
- In office 1942–1942
- Preceded by: William J. Galvin
- Succeeded by: Thomas J. Hannon

Member of the Boston City Council for Ward 7
- In office 1946–1950
- Preceded by: John E. Kerrigan
- Succeeded by: John J. McClogan
- In office 1940–1944
- Preceded by: John E. Kerrigan
- Succeeded by: John E. Kerrigan

Member of the Massachusetts House of Representatives for the 7th Suffolk District
- In office 1935–1941

Personal details
- Born: June 28, 1904 South Boston
- Died: August 5, 1974 (aged 70) Dorchester
- Party: Democratic
- Spouse: Katherine McGovern (1943–1974; his death)
- Education: Northeastern University School of Law; Northeastern University Business School
- Occupation: Lawyer

Thomas Edward Linehan (June 28, 1904 – August 5, 1974) was an American jurist and politician who served as a justice on the South Boston Municipal Court and was a member of the Massachusetts House of Representatives and the Boston City Council.

== Early life ==
Linehan was born on June 28, 1904, in South Boston. While in grammar school he received the nickname “Bobby” for his skill at “bobbing” in marbles. He graduated from South Boston High School, Northeastern University School of Law and Northeastern University Business School. During college he worked for a wholesale shoe company and a writing paper company and was a lab assistant. After finishing his education, Linehan extensively studied unemployment insurance. He was admitted to the Massachusetts Bar in 1932, the federal district courts in 1933, and the United States Supreme Court in 1940.

== Political career ==
Linehan served in the Massachusetts House of Representatives from 1937 to 1941. He was a member of the committee on banks and banking and the judiciary. He succeeded in passing a law that enlarged the scope of the Workmen's Compensation Act and relaxed the Juvenile Delinquency Act. He was also responsible for the act that turned the Dorchester Heights Monument over to the National Park Service.

He was elected to the Boston City Council in 1939. During his first two campaigns, Linehan did not make any speeches for his candidacy, instead spending time on the stump for Mayor Maurice J. Tobin. In 1942 he was elected council president. He was elected on the sixth ballot and 30 days after the first vote for council president.

On May 9, 1942, Linehan received his commission as a lieutenant, senior grade in the United States Naval Reserve. During World War II he served in the Pacific Theater and was discharged with the rank of lieutenant commander. On September 4, 1943, he married Katherine McGovern at Saint Augustine's Church. He did not seek reelection in 1943 because he was still in the service.

Linehan returned to the council in 1946, succeeding John E. Kerrigan who had run for Mayor. During his second stint on the council, Linehan championed veterans' causes, especially veterans' housing.

== Judicial career ==
On June 7, 1950, Governor Paul A. Dever appointed Linehan to succeed William J. Day as a special justice of the South Boston Municipal Court. In 1957 he was made presiding justice by Governor Foster Furcolo. He left the bench on June 28, 1974, upon reaching the mandatory retirement age of 70. His retirement was short-lived, as he died on August 5, 1974, at his home in Dorchester.

== See also ==
- 1937-1938 Massachusetts legislature
- 1939 Massachusetts legislature
