= William J. Keville =

American National Guard officer (1877-1960)

- Born: September 29, 1877; Somerville, Massachusetts, U.S.
- Died: November 14, 1960 (aged 83); Chelsea, Massachusetts, U.S.
- Burial place: Belmont Cemetery; Belmont, Massachusetts
- Military career
- Branch: United States Army
- Service years: 1897–1919; 1943–1946
- Rank: Brigadier general
- Commands: 101st Ammunition Train
- Awards: Distinguished Service Medal
- Other work: Adjutant General of Massachusetts; United States Marshal

William James Keville (September 29, 1877 – November 14, 1960) was an American National Guard officer who served as Adjutant General of Massachusetts during World War II. He also served as the United States Marshal for the District of Massachusetts from 1921 to 1934.

== Military service ==
Keville enlisted with Company M of the 8th Massachusetts Militia Regiment in 1897. His unit was mustered into federal service the following year and he served at the regiment's headquarters during the Spanish–American War. In 1900 he was appointed regimental orderly. In 1905 he was promoted to first lieutenant and made quartermaster and commissary of subsistence. In 1914 he was promoted to captain. The following year he was elected major of the company. In 1917 he was promoted to lieutenant colonel.

During World War I, Keville rose to the rank of colonel and served as the commander of the 101st Ammunition Train of the 26th Infantry Division. He was awarded the Distinguished Service Medal and the Legion of Honour. After the war, Keville declined a promotion to brigadier general and was placed on the retired list.

== United States Marshal ==
Keville was appointed United States Marshal for the District of Massachusetts by president Warren G. Harding on March 11, 1921. He was reappointed by president Calvin Coolidge in 1925 and Herbert Hoover in 1929. In 1927, Keville took out a $38,000 personal loan to pay the salaries of federal court officers after the United States Congress failed to pass an appropriation bill before the session ended.

== Adjutant General ==
On April 12, 1943, Keville was appointed Adjutant General of Massachusetts by Governor Leverett Saltonstall. His term expired in December 1945, but he remained in office until May 8, 1946, when Saltonstall's successor, Maurice J. Tobin, appointed William H. Harrison.

== Business career ==
Keville was a partner in the insurance and real estate firm of Eldredge & Keville and was president of the Waverly Cooperative Bank. From 1927 until his death in 1960, Keville was the chairman of the board of trustees of the Lawrence F. Quigley Memorial Hospital.

== Personal life ==
In 1908, Keville married to Frances Flaherty. They resided in Belmont, Massachusetts, where Keville served as a town meeting and school committee member. They had three children, one of whom, Edmund V. Keville, was an associate justice of the Massachusetts Appeals Court.

Government offices
Preceded by Patrick J. Duane	United States Marshal for the District of Massachusetts; 1921–1934	Succeeded by John J. Murphy
Military offices
Preceded by John H. Sherburne	Adjutant General of Massachusetts; 1943–1946	Succeeded by William H. Harrison
