= Edward Sirois =

American politician

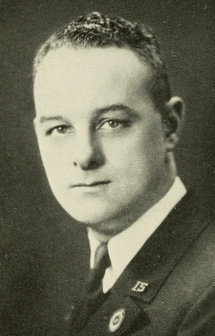

Member of the Massachusetts House of Representatives from the 5th Essex district
- In office 1935–1941

Personal details
- Born: December 18, 1898 Lawrence, Massachusetts
- Died: February 18, 1968 (aged 69) Ayer, Massachusetts
- Party: Republican
- Occupation: Florist; Insurance executive
- Awards: Legion of Merit

Military service
- Allegiance: United States
- Branch/service: Massachusetts National Guard
- Years of service: 1916–1956
- Rank: Major General

Edward Devlin Sirois (December 18, 1898 – February 18, 1968) was an American politician and Massachusetts National Guard officer who served as chairman of the Massachusetts Republican Party and was commander of the Yankee Division.

== Early life ==
Sirois was born on December 18, 1898, in Lawrence, Massachusetts. He graduated from Lawrence High School.

== Border War and World War I ==
Sirois joined the Massachusetts National Guard at the age of 17. In 1916 he was sent to the Mexican border during the Border War. During World War I he went to France with the 102nd Field Artillery Regiment. He took part in major engagements and was wounded. In 1919 he was promoted to lieutenant. His promotion required an act of Congress as he was only 20 years old (officers were supposed to be at least 21 years old).

== Political career ==
From 1921 to 1922, Sirois served as a service clerk for the city of Lawrence. In 1922 he was appointed manager of the United States Veterans' Bureau sub-district office in Lawrence. Following his father's death in 1924, Sirois took over his florist business. From 1935 to 1941, Sirois represented the 5th Essex District in the Massachusetts House of Representatives. In 1937, he was a candidate in the Massachusetts's 7th congressional district special election to fill the vacancy caused by the death of William P. Connery Jr. Sirois upset C. F. Nelson Pratt in the Republican primary, but lost to Connery's brother, Lawrence J. Connery, in the general election. From 1940 to 1941, Sirois was chairman of the Massachusetts Republican Party. He served as Robert F. Bradford's campaign manager during the 1946 gubernatorial election.

== World War II ==
Sirois remained in the National Guard after World War I and went into service when President Franklin D. Roosevelt federalized Massachusetts' National Guard units. He began the war as the commander of one of the 26th Infantry Division's field artillery battalions. He spent the last two years of the war in the China Burma India Theater. He organized the Army's first tank-destroyer battalion and was awarded the Legion of Merit for his work at the General Staff School for Chinese officers. He was discharged in 1946 as a colonel.

== Later life and death ==
In September 1946, Sirois was promoted to brigadier general and placed in command of the Yankee Division's four artillery battalions. His appointment was made by Governor Maurice J. Tobin while Sirois was managing the campaign of Tobin's gubernatorial opponent, Robert F. Bradford. In 1951, Sirois assumed command of the Yankee Division following the retirement of William I. Rose. He was promoted to major general in 1952. Sirois retired in 1956.

Outside of the National Guard, Sirois was the executive vice president and treasurer of the Mutual Fire Insurance Association of New England until his retirement in 1959.

Sirois died on February 18, 1968, at Nashoba Community Hospital in Ayer, Massachusetts.

== See also ==
- 1935–1936 Massachusetts legislature
- 1937–1938 Massachusetts legislature
- 1939 Massachusetts legislature

Party political offices
Preceded by George W. Schryver	Chairman of the Massachusetts Republican Party; 1940–1941	Succeeded by George B. Rowell
Military offices
Preceded by William I. Rose	Commanding General, 26th Infantry Division; 1951–1956	Succeeded by Reginald A. Maurer
