= Comers Commercial College =

Accounting school in Massachusetts, U.S.

Comers Commercial College, originally Corner's Initiatory Counting-Room, was an accounting and business practices school in Boston, Massachusetts. It was established by George N. Corner (died 1877) in 1840. It was located on 323 Washington Street.

A 14-page pamphlet was published for it in 1868. A token was issued promoting the school.

An advertisement in September 1897 for its 57th year touted courses in bookkeeping and shorthand. It was then at 666 Washington Street at the corner of Beach Street. An 1897 advertisement is also extant. An 1860 catalogue is also extant. The school had a separate department for female students.

It sold guides to penmanship, bookkeeping, and navigation. It also sold metallic pens it advertised as "the best ever made." Its 1873 "book-keeping" manual is extant.

== See also ==
- Scholfield's Commercial College, Rhode Island
