= Susan Bradley Donovan =

American politician (1895–1987)

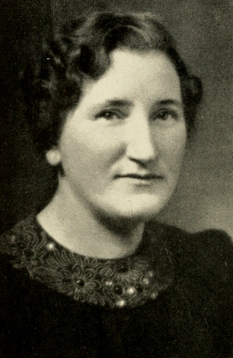
Donovan in 1939

Susan K. Bradley Donovan (October 2, 1895 – October 23, 1987) was an American politician who represented East Boston in the Massachusetts House between 1939 and 1944. Together with Enrico Cappucci, she lobbied for extension of time covered to compensate employees injured in industrial accidents. She served then as executive secretary of the Massachusetts Rehabilitation Commission until her retirement in 1965.

Donovan was born in East Boston on October 2, 1895. She attended Assumption Parochial School, Fitton High School, and Harvard Extension School of Accounting.

She was married to Timothy F. Donovan, a state representative and Boston City Councilor who died in 1933. They had two sons - James and Timothy. Donovan died on October 23, 1987, at St. Elizabeth's Hospital.
