= American Watch Tool Company =

- U.S. National Register of Historic Places
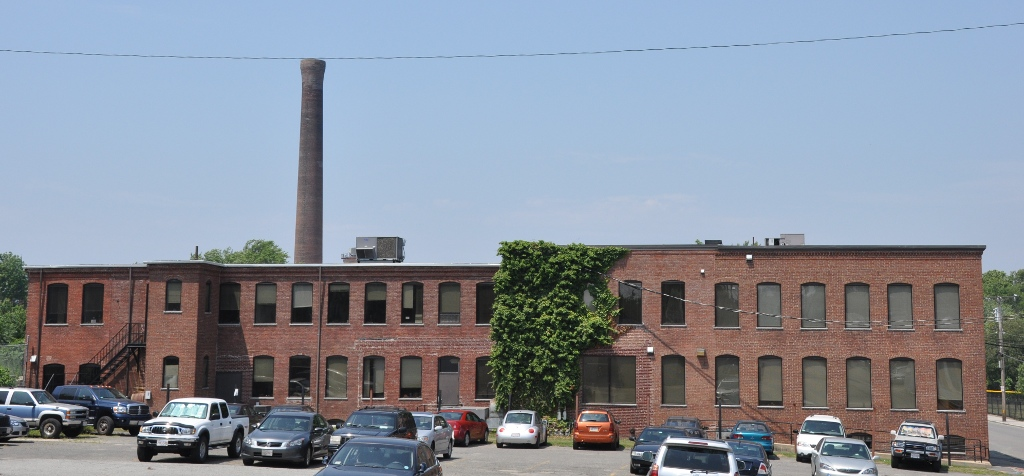

- Location within Massachusetts Location within the United States
- Location: Waltham, Massachusetts
- Coordinates: 42°22′17.5″N 71°13′54.8″W
- Area: less than one acre
- Built: 1877
- MPS: Waltham MRA
- NRHP reference No.: 89001574
- Added to NRHP: September 28, 1989

The American Watch Tool Company is a historic factory complex at 169 Elm Street in Waltham, Massachusetts. The company was founded in 1877 as a spin-off from the successful American Watch Company, and was used for the production of watchmaking tools until 1904. The four-building complex traces the evolutionary history of this business. The factory was listed on the National Register of Historic Places in 1989.

== Description and history ==
The American Watch Tool Company complex is located on the west side of Elm Street, a short way south of the Charles River. This complex of four connected buildings was built up between 1877 and 1916. All four buildings are two stories, and are built of brick. The largest building, dating to 1901, stands closest to the street; it is seven bays wide, six of which have windows set in segmented-arch openings at the two main levels, with smaller similar windows at the basement level. An entrance occupies the rightmost bay.

The American Watch Tool Company was established as a spinoff of the American Watch Company, Waltham's leading business of the late 19th century. The company was established by tool makers, many of whom had learned precision machining in other manufacturing areas, who then produced tools for use by other watch makers. This facility was used in that business until 1904, expanding the premises in 1879 and 1882. and was thereafter used by the Metz Company for the manufacture of automobiles. By 1950 the property was owned by the Belgian Spinning Company.

== See also ==
- National Register of Historic Places listings in Waltham, Massachusetts
