= George T. Ashe =

American politician (1905–1975)

55th Mayor of Lowell, Massachusetts
- In office 1940–1943
- Preceded by: Dewey G. Archambault
- Succeeded by: Joseph J. Sweeney (Acting mayor)

Member of the Massachusetts House of Representatives 15th Middlesex District
- In office 1935–1940

Personal details
- Born: February 6, 1905 Lowell, Massachusetts
- Died: May 1975 Lowell, Massachusetts
- Resting place: St. Patrick's Cemetery, Lowell, Mass
- Party: Democratic
- Spouse(s): Margaret Mary Grady; m. February 14th 1940; d July 23rd 1954. Helen M; Henderson m. August 15th 1956.
- Education: St. Patrick's Grammar School; St. Patrick's Academy
- Occupation: Salesman

George T. Ashe (February 6, 1905 – May 1975) was an American politician who served in the Massachusetts House of Representatives and as the fifty fifth Mayor of Lowell, Massachusetts. Ashe was the last administrative mayor of Lowell. In 1944 Lowell adopted the Massachusetts "Plan E" form of municipal government, under which the office of the mayor became a strictly ceremonial one.

== Early life ==
Ashe was born February 6, 1905, in Lowell, Massachusetts, to John Joseph and Mary Ellen (Sullivan) Ashe.

== Corruption conviction ==
In October 1942 Ashe was convicted on charges of conspiracy involving bribery for city purchases. In November 1942 Ashe was sentenced to a year in the House of Correction by Judge Vincent T. Erogna. He began his sentence on December 22, 1942.

== See also ==
- 1935–1936 Massachusetts legislature
- 1937–1938 Massachusetts legislature
- 1939 Massachusetts legislature

Political offices
Preceded by Dewey G. Archambault	55th Mayor of Lowell, Massachusetts; 1940-1943	Succeeded by Joseph J. Sweeney (Acting mayor)
