= Massachusetts State Defense Force =

The Massachusetts State Defense Force
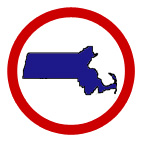
- Massachusetts State Defense Force insignia.
- Active: 1863–1868, 1898–1899, 1905–1911, 1917–1919, 1942–1947, 1964–1976, 1981–2008, 2011–2016, 2023–Present (Chaplain Only)
- Country: United States
- Allegiance: Massachusetts
- Branch: Army
- Type: State defense force
- Role: Military reserve force
- Part of: Massachusetts Organized Militia
- Garrison/HQ: Hanscom Air Force Base
- Website: MSDF Official Website

Commanders
- Civilian leadership: Governor Maura Healey (Governor of the Commonwealth of Massachusetts)
- State military leadership: Brigadier General Gary Smith

The Massachusetts State Defense Force (MSDF) is the state defense force of the Commonwealth of Massachusetts. It was inactivated in 2016 by Governor Charlie Baker. The purpose of the Massachusetts State Defense Force, when active, is to augment the Massachusetts National Guard during emergencies in the state, especially when some or all of the National Guard was deployed. The MSDF is an all-volunteer militia which reported to the State Adjutant General and was under the command of the Governor of Massachusetts. Members met for drills one weekend per month unless activated by the Governor during an emergency. The MSDF was headquartered at Milford, Massachusetts, in the same building as the Massachusetts National Guard. The director of the MSDF was appointed by the Adjutant General of Massachusetts (TAGMA). The Massachusetts State Defense Force is authorized by both the Constitution of Massachusetts and chapter 33 § 10 of the Massachusetts General Laws.

The MSDF operates within Massachusetts and cannot be called into federal service. The MSDF can assist the United States National Guard forces, assumes state missions when the National Guard was deployed, provide emergency support during disasters, and assist in color guards and funeral details.

== History ==
=== Early history ===
The Massachusetts General Court formed the MSDF's predecessor in 1863, which served until its disbandment in 1866. During the American Civil War, Massachusetts provided multiple units to support the Union cause. The Massachusetts militia was reformed in 1898 as the Massachusetts Provisional Militia for the Spanish–American War before again being disbanded in 1899. During the course of the war, five infantry regiments and one artillery regiment from the Massachusetts Provisional Militia were deployed.

=== 20th century ===
By 1908, the Massachusetts Volunteer Militia consisted of two brigades and some unattached units ("total strength, 6,524"), commanded by William H. Brigham and Governor Curtis Guild, Jr.

In April 1917, the General Court again reformed the militia, renaming it the Massachusetts State Guard due to the events of World War I. Anticipating a possible German invasion or other emergency and lacking the National Guard due to deployment, many states created and trained state guard units.

After the Halifax Explosion in Nova Scotia in 1917, a medical detachment from the Massachusetts State Guard was among the first units to arrive and offer aid. As an expression of gratitude for the aid provided by the Boston Red Cross and the Massachusetts State Guard, the city of Halifax sent the city of Boston a Christmas tree, a gift which was revived in the form of an annual tradition conducted by the province of Nova Scotia in 1971 which continues to this day. During the 1918 flu pandemic, the Massachusetts State Guard operated nine hospitals to treat civilians.

The State Guard was activated during World War II and served as a light infantry division until deactivation in February 1947. During World War II, the Massachusetts State Guard, training alongside other guardsmen from other states in New England, practiced capturing soldiers from Fort Devens (then Camp Devens) who would pose as enemy paratroopers, and "practiced using grenades, digging trenches, charging across fields with their shotguns, making incendiary and smoke bombs and Molotov cocktails, and creating roadblocks." The guard also maintained a Flying Column as a quick reaction force to help compensate for the National Guard's absence, and were active for the duration of the war. In addition to the combat division, the Massachusetts State Guard operated the Women's Defense Force (WDC), a unit made up of women who were responsible for medical, firefighting, air raid alert, transportation, canteen, and communications services.

During the Vietnam War, the Massachusetts State Guard was reorganized and trained to be able to replace the 26th Infantry Division of the Massachusetts National Guard in the event that the guard unit was deployed.

=== 21st Century ===
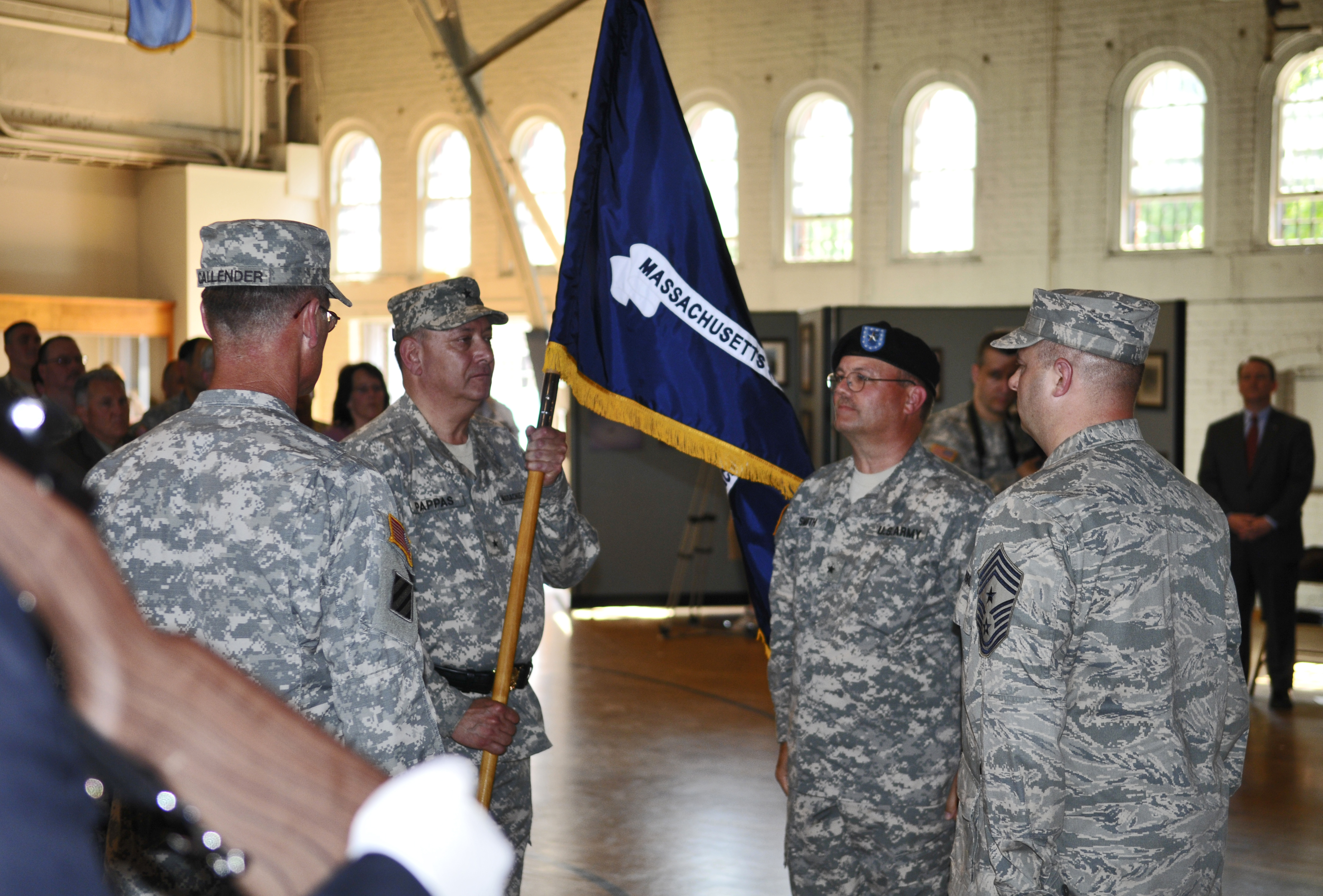
Brig. Gen. (Ret.) Gary Pappas, Commander, Massachusetts State Defense Force, holds his command's colors during the Massachusetts State Defense Force's activation ceremony at the Massachusetts National Guard Museum and Archives.

The Guard was renamed the Massachusetts Military Reserve in June 1994; the State Guard name was restored during the group's reorganization after the September 11, 2001 attacks. The Massachusetts State Defense Force went on inactive status in February 2008. However, due to the need for additional assistance in emergency management, and the shortage of state resources due to frequent deployments of the National Guard, the Massachusetts State Defense Force was reactivated on May 31, 2011. The State Defense force was deactivated in 2016 by Governor Charlie Baker. The MSDF was active as of December 2023 with one commissioned Chaplain.

== Duties ==
The purpose of the Massachusetts State Defense Force is to execute the state duties of the Massachusetts National Guard when the Guard is either partially or completely deployed. Since the MSDF cannot be deployed outside the state of Massachusetts, the Governor of Massachusetts always has military units in the state able to respond to an emergency. The primary responsibilities of the MSDF are to provide operational support to disaster relief, to provide professional support to the Massachusetts National Guard, and to aid in providing a medical response during and after a disaster. State Guardsmen may also aid in color guards and military funerals.

On the recommendations of a steering committee involved in the reformation of the Massachusetts State Defense Force in 2011, the MSDF was slated to expand into a number of different roles, including:

- Support or augment professional staff functions of the National Guard including legal, chaplain, public affairs, information technology, medical, dental, mental health, and other professional functions;
- Support operational capabilities of National Guard operations including DOMS, Joint Adaptive Battle Staff, and chemical, biological, radiological, nuclear and high yield explosive (CBRNE) enhanced response force packages (CERFP).

== Membership ==
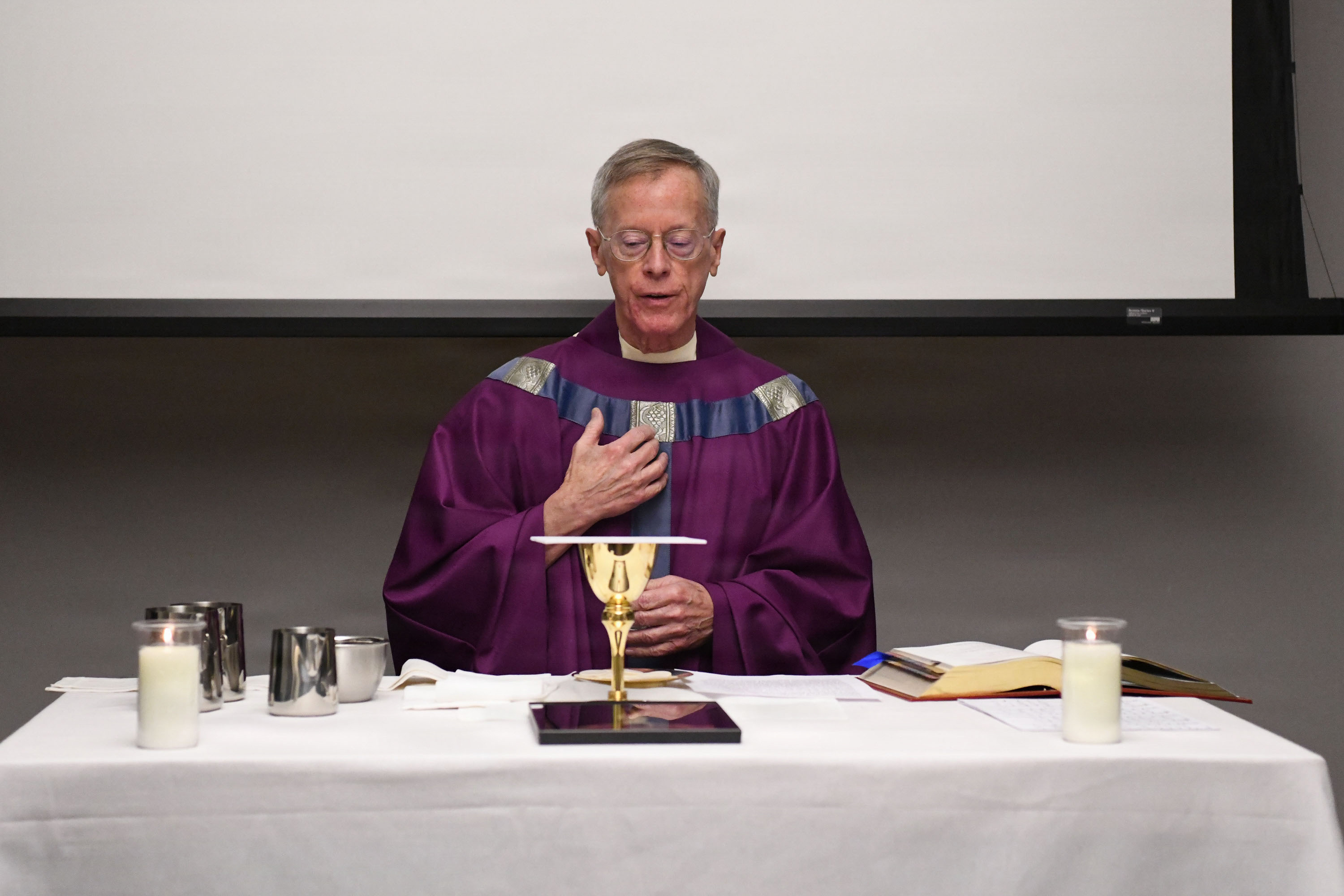
Massachusetts State Defense Force Chaplain (Capt.) John Smegal recites an opening prayer during a Catholic Mass at Barnes Air National Guard Base.

Recruiting in the Massachusetts State Guard is focused at the following residents of Massachusetts (and non-residents on a case-by-case basis):

- Honorably discharged members of the uniformed services of the United States, including active duty, reserve, and National Guard;
- Ordained clergymen of any religious denomination;
- Health service professionals (Chiropractors, Dentists, Optometrists, Physicians, Podiatrists, Psychologists, and Veterinarians as well as Audiologists, Biomedical Laboratory Technologists, Clinical Mental Health Professionals, Dieticians, Health Service Administrators, Nurse Practitioners, Pharmacists, Physical Therapists, Physician Assistants, Public Health Specialists, Occupational Therapists, Registered Nurses, Respiratory Therapists, and Social Workers);
- Licensed attorneys permitted to practice law in Massachusetts.

To become an officer in the Massachusetts State Defense Force, a Guardsman must have earned a bachelor's degree.

Like the National Guard, members served on a reserve basis as part-time members and may only be called into service at the discretion of the Governor of Massachusetts, with the exception of drills one weekend per month. Therefore, prospective members are only required to commit to one weekend of training per month unless called up.

== Units ==
Members of the MSDF were assigned to either the MSDF's staff brigade or one of the three MSDF battalions: 1st Battalion (Operational Support), 2nd Battalion (Professional Support), or 3rd Battalion (Medical Response Force).

== Uniforms ==
The Massachusetts State Defense Force most recently used the Army Combat Uniform and a patrol cap. The patch which says "U.S. Army" on federal army soldiers is replaced by one which says "Massachusetts." An MSDF unit patch is worn on the left sleeve along with the American flag, and combat badges and awards earned during federal or National Guard service are allowed to be worn on the right sleeve of the MSDF uniform.

== Legal protection ==
Under Massachusetts law, members of MSDF are guaranteed the same employment protections as federal reservists are provided through the Uniformed Services Employment and Reemployment Rights Act (USERRA), guaranteeing that all MSDF are guaranteed a leave of absence in the event they are activated, and are guaranteed their position upon returning from deployment.

== See also ==
- Massachusetts Wing Civil Air Patrol
- Naval militia
- United States Coast Guard Auxiliary
