= 29th Massachusetts Infantry Regiment =

29th Regiment Massachusetts Volunteer Infantry
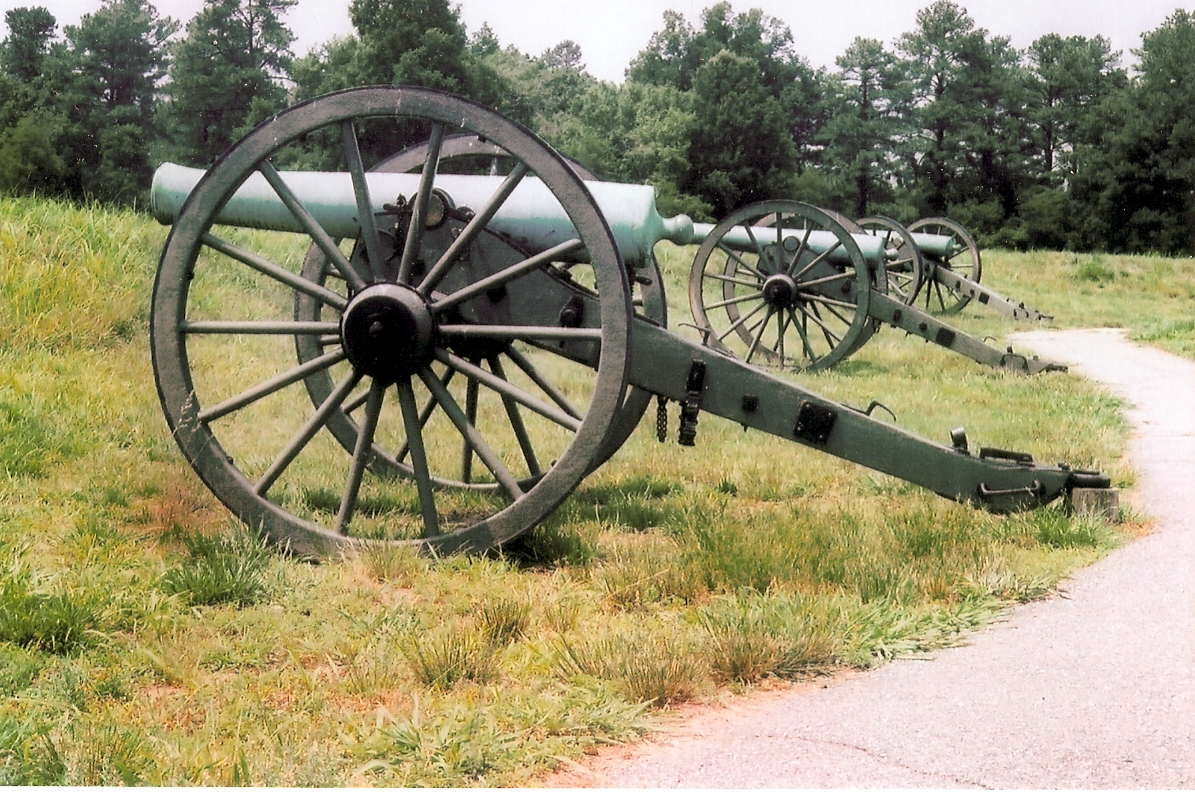
- Cannons on the site of Fort Stedman where the 29th saw heavy combat on March 25, 1865.
- Active: December 13, 1861 – August 11, 1865
- Country: United States of America
- Allegiance: Union
- Branch: Union Army
- Type: Infantry
- Part of: In December 1862: 2nd Brigade (Christ's), 1st Division (Burns's), IX Corps, Army of the Potomac

Commanders
- Notable commanders: Col. Joseph H. Barnes

Insignia
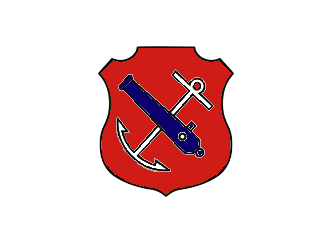
- IX Corps (1st Division) badge

The 29th Regiment Massachusetts Volunteer Infantry was an infantry regiment in the Union army of the United States during the American Civil War. The regiment was organized in December 1861 when three new companies were attached to a battalion of seven Massachusetts companies that had been in active service since May 1861. These seven companies had been recruited to fill out the 3rd Massachusetts and 4th Massachusetts regiments and had signed on for three years of service. When the 3rd and 4th Massachusetts were mustered out in July 1861, the seven companies that had signed on for three years were grouped together to form a battalion known as the Massachusetts Battalion. Finally, in December 1861, three more companies were added to their roster to form a full regiment and the unit was designated the 29th Massachusetts.

The regiment took part in 29 battles and four sieges in a variety of theaters of the war. After their early service at Fortress Monroe in Virginia, the 29th was attached, in the spring of 1862, to the Army of the Potomac during the Peninsular Campaign as part of the famed Irish Brigade. The 29th had the distinction of being the only regiment of non-Irish ethnicity to serve in that brigade. In January 1863, the IX Corps (including the 29th Massachusetts) was transferred to Kentucky and engaged in operations against Confederate guerillas. In the summer of 1863, the IX Corps was again transferred and took part in the siege of Vicksburg and the siege of Jackson, Mississippi. In the fall of 1863, IX Corps took part in the Knoxville Campaign which resulted in the defeat of Confederate forces in eastern Tennessee. The spring of 1864 saw the IX Corps and the 29th Massachusetts once again returned to duty with the Army of the Potomac, just in time to take part in the Overland Campaign and the siege of Petersburg. During the siege of Petersburg, the unit suffered their worst casualties of the war in the Battle of Fort Stedman on March 25, 1865.

The 29th was mustered out of service on August 11, 1865. Including the seven months served by most of the regiment before its designation as the 29th, the unit had one of the longest terms of service of any Massachusetts regiment—a total of four years and three months.

== Massachusetts Battalion ==
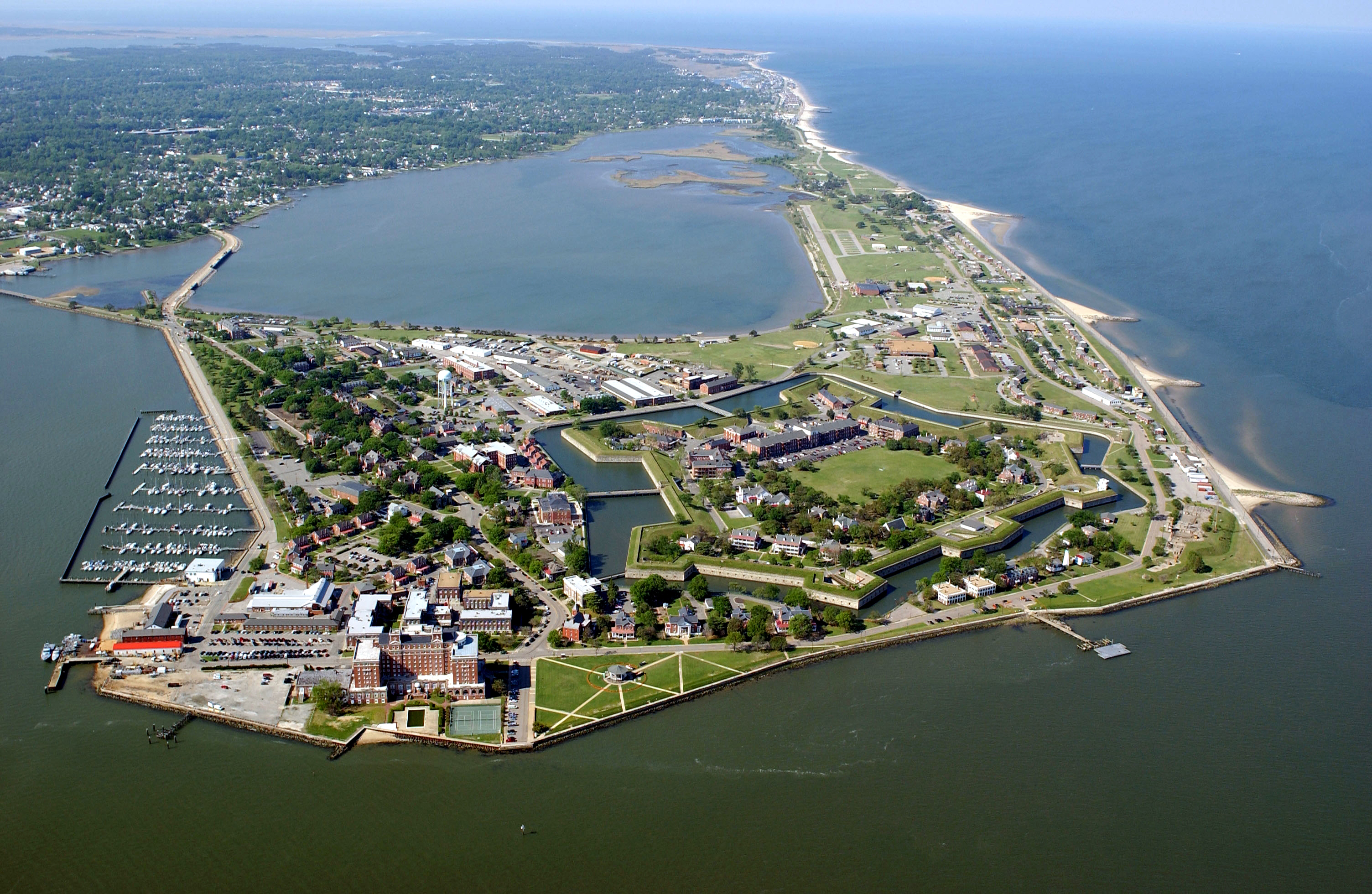
An aerial view of Fortress Monroe where the Massachusetts Battalion served in 1861

On April 15, 1861, three days after the attack on Fort Sumter, the call went out from Massachusetts Governor John Andrew for the immediate mobilization of the four existing regiments of Massachusetts militia. The 3rd and 4th Massachusetts both left for Washington, D.C., on April 17 to serve a term of 90 days. But in their haste to reach the capital, these regiments had departed without a full complement of ten companies as required by army regulations. In the following weeks, seven additional companies were formed in Massachusetts and assigned to the 3rd and 4th to fill out their rosters. Unlike the majority of companies in the 3rd and 4th regiments, which had enlisted for 90 days, these new companies signed on for three years of service. These seven companies would eventually form the majority of the 29th Massachusetts.

While serving with the 3rd and the 4th Massachusetts, these companies were primarily garrisoned at Fortress Monroe at the end of the Virginia Peninsula. This strategically important foothold in Virginia allowed Union forces to control the major waterway of Hampton Roads. In an unsuccessful effort to strengthen their hold on the Peninsula, Union troops marched from Fortress Monroe and attacked the Confederate position at Big Bethel Church, resulting in the Battle of Big Bethel on June 10, 1861. Two of the companies that would eventually become part of the 29th were involved in this action. The expedition was commanded by Colonel Ebenezer W. Peirce.

When the 3rd and 4th Massachusetts regiments were mustered out in July 1861, the seven "three-year" companies were consolidated on July 16 to form the "Massachusetts Battalion" under the command of Captain Joseph H. Barnes. The battalion served relatively light garrison and guard duty at Fortress Monroe, Newport News and Hampton for the remainder of 1861. In December, three more companies were added to the battalion and, with a full complement of ten companies, the unit became known as the 29th Massachusetts Infantry.

Peirce was appointed the first commander of the 29th. The regimental historian recorded that this appointment was "exceedingly distasteful" to the 29th as there had been an expectation that Barnes, who had led the Massachusetts Battalion, would command the new regiment. Barnes, however, was placed second in command to Peirce as lieutenant colonel. Further, Peirce was disliked for his failure at Big Bethel. During the winter of 1862, charges were brought against Peirce by officers of the 29th and he was court-martialed for incompetence and improper conduct. His superior officer, Brigadier General John E. Wool, overturned the ruling and Peirce remained in command of the 29th Massachusetts.

== Peninsular campaign ==
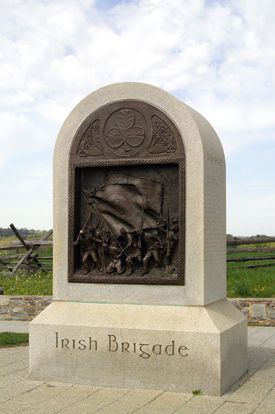
The Irish Brigade Monument on the Antietam Battlefield. The 29th was assigned to the Irish Brigade during the Peninsular Campaign and served in that unit through the Battle of Antietam.

During the winter and early spring of 1862, the 29th was deployed on various minor expeditions near Fortress Monroe, Newport News and Norfolk, Virginia. On March 8 and 9, the regiment was present during the Battle of Hampton Roads, a naval engagement fought primarily between the USS Monitor and the CSS Virginia. The regiment helped man a land battery during the engagement, and the men of the 29th were amazed by the new ironclad vessels and the changes they brought to naval warfare.

In the middle of March, once again at Fortress Monroe, the 29th witnessed the arrival of the Army of the Potomac, commanded by Major General George B. McClellan. McClellan intended to use Fortress Monroe as his base of operations for an assault on the Confederate capital of Richmond. The effort would be known as the Peninsular Campaign. Over the course of March 1862, the men of the 29th watched as roughly 100,000 Union soldiers and 15,000 mules and horses debarked from Fortress Monroe. The 29th was to remain at Fortress Monroe as the Army of the Potomac made its way toward Richmond. As the campaign became bogged down outside the Confederate capital, additional troops were called for and the 29th Massachusetts departed Hampton Roads on June 7, 1862.

=== Attachment to the Irish Brigade ===
Traveling by steamboat up the York River, the 29th arrived at White House Landing and marched to the battle front on June 8, 1862. The regiment was attached to the Irish Brigade (2nd Brigade, 1st Division, II Corps). Contemporaries and historians alike have wondered at this unusual assignment. The 29th Massachusetts was made up of men descended, largely, from old-stock English families, some with heritage dating back to the Mayflower. There was, at the time, significant social friction in New England between established Protestant families and Irish immigrants. While the regimental historian observed that the 29th was "cordially welcomed" to the Irish Brigade, other historians, such as Marion Armstrong, point out the oddity of the "aristocratic 29th Massachusetts ... thrown in with three regiments of New York Irishmen." Historian Daniel Callaghan quotes period sources describing the "unlikely matching of ancient political foes," and the manner in which the men of the 29th tolerated the Irish-born commander of the Irish Brigade, Brig. Gen. Thomas Francis Meagher, "coldly, in a pinched and critical silence."

Despite these social differences, the 29th Massachusetts fought alongside the Irish regiments through heavy combat (the first the regiment had seen) during the Seven Days Battles. During this series of battles, the Confederates drove McClellan's army away from Richmond, resulting in the failure of the Peninsular Campaign. After the Union retreat, Meagher praised the 29th's actions in battle saying that they "had proved themselves the equals of any others in the Brigade, and had no superiors in the army." Meagher would later call the 29th "Irishmen in disguise." During the Seven Days Battles, the 29th suffered moderate casualties of six killed and 18 wounded. These casualties included Peirce whose right arm was shot off by cannon fire. Command of the regiment then fell to Barnes.

== Maryland campaign ==
Following the failure of the Peninsular campaign, elements of the Army of the Potomac were shipped to northern Virginia to provide assistance to Union Maj. Gen. John Pope. Pope had been attempting to open a second assault on Richmond from the north, but he was defeated during the Second Battle of Bull Run on August 30, 1862. The 29th Massachusetts, along with other elements of the II Corps, arrived too late to take part in the battle.

After his victory at Bull Run, Confederate Gen. Robert E. Lee invaded Maryland in September 1862. The Army of the Potomac, including the 29th Massachusetts, moved to intercept the Confederate offensive. The two armies clashed at Sharpsburg, Maryland, during the Battle of Antietam on September 17, 1862.

=== Battle of Antietam ===
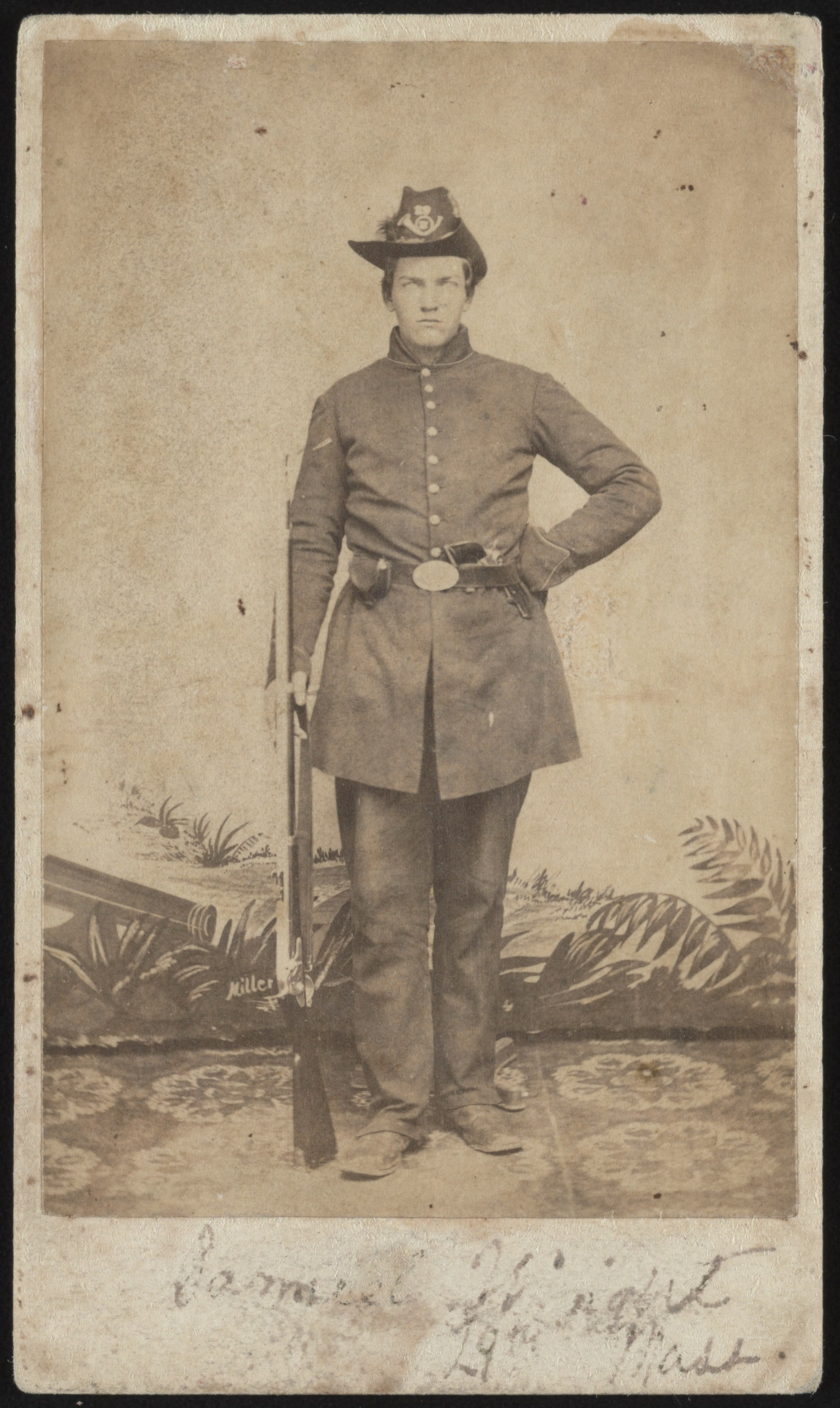
Sgt. Samuel C. Wright, 29th Massachusetts, earned the Medal of Honor for his actions at Antietam

The battle commenced in the early morning with several assaults on the Confederate left flank by the I Corps and the XII Corps. After these failed, the II Corps, including the Irish Brigade, was called upon to assault a position near the Confederate center known as the "Sunken Road" or "Bloody Lane." The trench-like road afforded the Confederates a strong defensive position. Just after 9 a.m., Maj. Gen. Israel B. Richardson's division, with the Irish Brigade in the lead, moved toward the Sunken Road. Meagher envisioned the delivery of a few volleys from the brigade followed by an impetuous charge. As the Irish Brigade advanced up the crest toward the Sunken Road, it took heavy fire from the Confederates. The progress of the brigade was slowed by a sturdy split rail fence. When Meagher asked for volunteers to run forward and take it down, Corporal Samuel C. Wright of the 29th sprang forward with several others. Wright recalled that many were shot down before they reached the fence and, as "one would grasp a rail, it would be sent flying out of his hands by rifle shots." The dash back to the lines was just as dangerous. Cpl. Wright was later awarded the Medal of Honor for his bravery at Antietam. He would, over the course of successive battles, be wounded five times and reported dead twice. Despite his travails, he survived the war.

The Irish Brigade, though advancing in good order under heavy fire and delivering effective fire in return, did not reach the Sunken Road. The brigade retired, the regimental historian observed, "as steadily as on drill." The 29th has been criticized by some historians, including Marion Armstrong, for not advancing as quickly as the rest of the Irish Brigade. An accident in the terrain, a small rise in front of the 29th's position, afforded them cover, and their casualties were lighter than those of the other regiments of the brigade. Armstrong argues that Barnes was reluctant to leave this advantageous ground, a factor which may have contributed to the failure of the Irish Brigade's charge. The casualties of the 29th were nine killed, 31 wounded and four missing.

== Fredericksburg Campaign ==
The Battle of Antietam had been a tactical stalemate. McClellan claimed it as a strategic victory as Lee's army retreated into Virginia. Despite this, President Lincoln was displeased with McClellan's failure to pursue Lee and replaced him with Maj. Gen. Ambrose Burnside. During November 1862, Burnside proceeded to gather the Army of the Potomac in Falmouth, Virginia, preparing to assault Lee's army across the Rappahannock River in Fredericksburg, Virginia.

=== Removal from the Irish Brigade ===
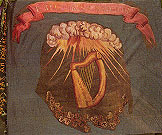
The flag of the Irish Brigade which the 29th Massachusetts declined to carry.

While in camp in Falmouth in late November, the officers of the 29th learned that Meagher had arranged for a green Irish Brigade flag to be presented to the regiment, recognizing their role as "honorary Irishmen" and their bravery during the Battle of Antietam. Barnes declined the gift, however. According to the regimental historian, "While the Colonel would have been proud to receive the flag for the regiment as a token of the respect of their Irish comrades, yet he objected to the flag being carried by the regiment, on the ground that it was not an Irish regiment." Irish Brigade historians, including Joseph Bilby, have observed that there may have been some controversy surrounding the issue. According to Bilby, Barnes refused to accept the flag because they believed it "would brand them as Fenians," or Irish revolutionaries.

As a result of this incident, on November 30, 1862, the 29th was transferred out of the Irish Brigade and into Brig. Gen. Benjamin C. Christ's brigade in the IX Army Corps. It was replaced in the Irish Brigade by the 28th Massachusetts, an Irish regiment.

The transfer spared the 29th from the Battle of Fredericksburg in which their new brigade played almost no role. Their former comrades in the Irish Brigade, however, made a harrowing charge during the battle and suffered severe casualties.

== Kentucky ==
Following his failure during the Battle of Fredericksburg, Burnside was removed from command of the Army of the Potomac and returned to the command of the IX Corps, to which the 29th Massachusetts now belonged. On February 5, 1863, the IX Corps was detached from the Army of the Potomac and transferred from Virginia to Kentucky where Burnside was to take command of the Department of the Ohio and Union operations in Kentucky and east Tennessee.

The 29th Massachusetts reached Cincinnati via railroad on March 26, then marched into Kentucky. They were stationed in Paris, Kentucky, during April 1863, conducting light duty in defending against occasional raids by Confederate guerrillas. In late April they marched to Somerset, Kentucky, where they were occupied with similar duty until early June 1863.

== Mississippi ==
In early June, most of the IX Corps was transferred to the command of Maj. Gen. Ulysses Grant who required reinforcements in the siege of Vicksburg, the last major Confederate stronghold on the Mississippi River. The 29th Massachusetts traveled with other elements of the IX Corps via steamship down the Ohio and Mississippi Rivers. They arrived in the vicinity of Vicksburg in late June and began digging entrenchments. Less than two weeks after the regiment arrived in Mississippi, the city of Vicksburg surrendered on July 4, 1863.

Following the surrender of Vicksburg, the remaining Confederate forces in Mississippi concentrated in the state capital of Jackson. Maj. Gen. William Tecumseh Sherman took several corps of Unions troops, including the IX Corps, and laid siege to Jackson in mid-July. While digging trenches, the 29th was exposed to heavy artillery and sharpshooter fire from the Confederates, but the regiment suffered only one casualty during the siege. During the night of July 16, the Confederate army in Jackson managed to slip away from the city and the siege was ended.

Shortly afterward, the IX Corps was recalled to Kentucky, as Burnside was eager to begin his operations in Tennessee. On the way back to Vicksburg, the 29th acted as provost guard, marching at the rear of the IX Corps to gather stragglers. They missed the first group of steamships to depart for Cincinnati and had to wait three weeks, until August 12, with other regiments at a camp in Milldale, Mississippi, near Vicksburg. Camp conditions were unsanitary and the weather extremely hot. Many of the men suffered from disease during and after this encampment. As the regimental historian wrote, "Deaths were very frequent among the troops here during this time, burial parties were almost constantly engaged, and the funeral notes of the fife and drum could be heard nearly every hour in the day. None save the strongest came out of that campaign in sound health."

== Knoxville Campaign ==
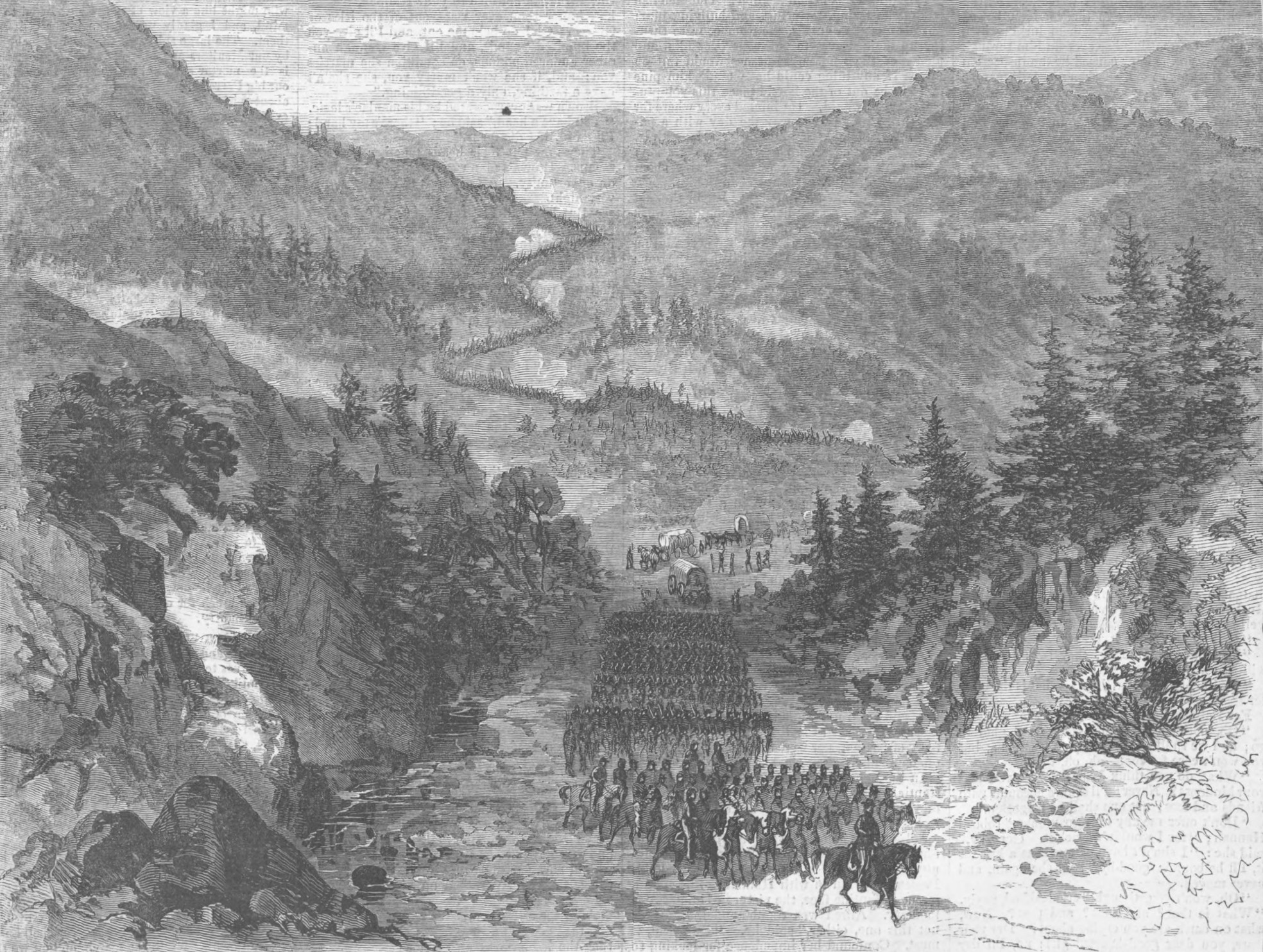
Maj. Gen. Ambrose Burnside's Army of the Ohio passing through Cumberland Gap to occupy eastern Tennessee.

Burnside gathered his Army of the Ohio in the vicinity of Lexington, Kentucky, in late August 1863 in preparation for an invasion of eastern Tennessee. The region was strategically important as a rail link between Virginia and Chattanooga. The population of eastern Tennessee was also primarily Unionist, so it became a key strategic goal of Lincoln's to force Confederate troops out of the region in the hope that Unionists would gain support and bring the state back into the Union.

Prior to the march, half of the men in the 29th were on the sick list as a result of their service in Mississippi, including Barnes, who took an extended leave and returned for a time to Massachusetts. In his absence, Peirce returned to the 29th to command the unit.

The march across Kentucky, through the Cumberland Gap and on to Knoxville, Tennessee, was one of the longest marches the 29th ever executed—a distance of more than 200 miles (320 km) covered between September 1 and September 26, 1863.

On October 21, the IX Corps made camp in and around Lenoir City, Tennessee, and remained there until November 14, 1863. During this time, Confederate Lt. Gen. James Longstreet launched an offensive aimed at the expulsion of Burnside's troops from Knoxville. The IX Corps, including the 29th Massachusetts, moved southwest to meet the Confederates near Loudon, Tennessee. Union forces were rapidly repulsed and retreated to Knoxville. The siege of that city by the Confederates began in mid-November 1863. The 29th's position during the siege was within Fort Sanders. When Longstreet launched his assault on Fort Sanders on November 29, 1863, the 29th saw heavy action in repulsing the Confederates. Two members of the 29th, Sgt. Jeremiah Mahoney and Pvt. Joseph S. Manning, later received the Medal of Honor for their bravery in capturing two Confederate battle flags during the battle. The 29th lost only two killed in the Battle of Fort Sanders owing to the strength of their position on the walls of the fort.

Following this Union victory and the retreat of Longstreet's troops to Virginia, the 29th was stationed in mid-December 1863 at Blaine, Tennessee, about 20 miles (32 km) northeast of Knoxville. Camped on an open plain, exposed to wind and snow, and running very low on provisions, the regiment suffered severely during December 1863 and January 1864 and referred to the camp at Blaine as their Valley Forge. At the end of December, Barnes rejoined the 29th as its commander and Peirce was elevated to brigade command.

In January 1864, with the end of their three-year term of service only four months away, the men of the 29th were given the option to reenlist for another three years. Those men who chose to accept the offer would receive a 30-day furlough, while those that did not would be consolidated with the 36th Massachusetts to serve out their remaining months. A total of 166 men chose to reenlist and approximately 90 did not.

On March 21, 1864, the 29th and the IX Corps commenced their long march back to Ohio via the Cumberland Gap, reaching Cincinnati on April 1, 1864. From there, the men who had reenlisted were sent back to Boston for the furlough they had been promised and those who had not were sent on to Virginia to join the 36th Massachusetts.

== Overland Campaign ==
While the remaining men of the 29th were on furlough in Massachusetts, Lt. Gen. Ulysses Grant, as general-in-chief of the Union Army, began the Overland Campaign. During the spring of 1864, he would direct the actions of the Army of the Potomac in northern Virginia, aggressively pushing Lee's Confederate army toward Richmond in a series of major battles. The men formerly of the 29th who had been transferred to the 36th Massachusetts took part in the opening battles of the campaign, the Battle of the Wilderness and the Battle of Spotsylvania Court House, incurring casualties of seven killed and 30 wounded out of a total of 90 men. This detachment fulfilled their three-year enlistment in mid-May 1864 and returned home.

The furlough for the newly reenlisted ended on May 16 and the 29th Massachusetts, now a small fraction of its original size, departed for Virginia. They rejoined the Army of the Potomac on May 20, 1864, just in time to take part in the closing battles of the Overland Campaign, particularly the Battle of Cold Harbor. On June 1, 1864, the regiment suffered casualties of one killed, 12 wounded and three captured during Grant's first assault at Cold Harbor. Although the regiment had been temporarily assigned to the V Corps, on June 3 it rejoined the IX Corps. Over the next nine days, the regiment built breastworks and served on picket duty until June 12 when IX Corps rapidly marched to the outskirts of Petersburg, Virginia, in preparation for an assault on that city.

== Siege of Petersburg ==
=== Assault on Petersburg ===
In the pre-dawn hours of June 17, the divisions of the IX Corps formed up for an assault on the entrenched Confederate position outside Petersburg. Barnes of the 29th had been elevated to command of the 2nd Brigade, 1st Division of the IX Corps, to which the 29th belonged. Major Charles Chipman was placed in command of the 29th in his stead. While other divisions of the IX Corps attacked and were repulsed, the 1st Division moved to its assigned position in the late afternoon and lay down, studying the Confederate breastworks and awaiting orders to advance. At first, the division, to its relief, received orders that the attack had been called off. A short time later, however, came the order to attack. The division, including the 29th, charged from their protected position in a ravine out into an open plain in front of the Confederate entrenchments. According to the regimental historian, "They had scarcely emerged upon the open plain, when the whole crest of the Confederate works was fringed with fire and smoke; grape, canister, and musketballs filled the air."

During this charge, the color-bearer of the 29th, Sgt. Silas Grosvenor, was shot through the head. The colors were picked up by Sgt. John A. Tighe who was also killed. Sergeant Major William F. Willis picked up the flag and became the third color-bearer killed in the charge. At this point, the 29th was forced to pause in its advance and retired a short distance. In the confusion, the colors were left on the field. Major Chipman asked for two volunteers to go with him onto the open ground to retrieve the colors. The three found the colors and, according to the regimental historian, the Confederates, admiring the bravery of the trio, did not fire and allowed them to return to their lines.

The 1st Division of the IX Corps eventually captured the Confederate works in their front, however little had been accomplished by the assault on Petersburg overall. The Confederates remained strongly entrenched and the long siege of Petersburg began. The 29th, numbering just 100 men at this time, lost six killed and 23 wounded.

=== Battle of the Crater ===
The 29th occupied trenches outside Petersburg with the rest of the Army of the Potomac during the summer of 1864. In July, Union troops dug a mine beneath the Confederate position and, on July 30, 1864, a massive amount of gunpowder was detonated in the mine, blasting a hole in the Confederate position. During the resulting Battle of the Crater, the 1st Division of the IX Corps led a confused and failed attack. The 29th took part, charging into the crater with other regiments and eventually retreating, losing three killed, seven wounded and six captured.

=== Battle of Fort Stedman ===
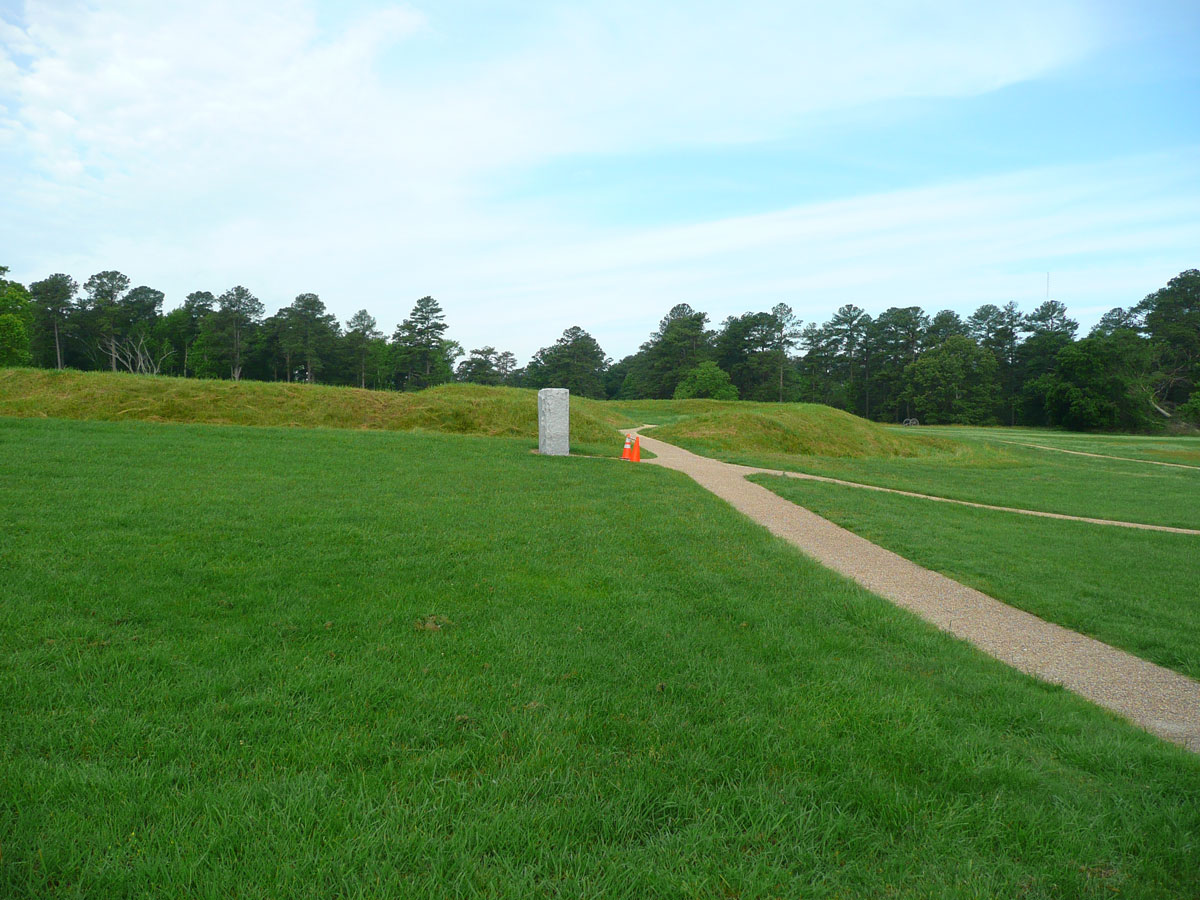
The site of Fort Stedman outside Petersburg, Virginia.

The 29th played a minor role in the Battle of Globe Tavern, a movement intended to tighten the siege around Petersburg, on August 18, 1864. The regiment suffered only a few casualties during this engagement. In the fall of 1864, the 29th served uneventful duty along the Petersburg siege lines and was eventually, in November, assigned a garrison post in Battery 11, a small, unfinished ravelin (detached fortification) outside of Fort Stedman. Stedman was one of many earthen fortifications built along Union lines during the siege, and was only 150 yards from the Confederate trenches—the narrowest distance between the two armies. They would remain at this post for the next four months.

On March 25, 1865, the regiment fought in the Battle of Fort Stedman, the Confederate Army's final offensive during the Siege of Petersburg. Before dawn on March 25, Confederate troops achieved complete surprise and easily occupied Fort Stedman entering the rear sally port almost unchallenged. Major Charles T. Richardson, then in command of the 29th, hearing some light gunfire, ordered the 29th to fall in. No general alarm had yet been raised, but Richardson felt certain that an attack was underway. Within minutes, approximately 500 Confederates, a small part of the overall offensive, swept over Battery 11. The 29th held their ground, however, engaging in heated hand-to-hand combat and eventually capturing 300 Confederates—more than twice their own number. The Confederates still occupied Fort Stedman, however, and soon sent another offensive to occupy Battery 11. This time, the 29th was forced to retreat to Fort Haskell, the nearest defensible position.

Among the 29th's casualties in this engagement was Sgt. Calvin F. Harlow who, finding himself surrounded by Confederates, refused to surrender. He and the Confederate officer demanding his surrender shot each other simultaneously. Poet Walt Whitman, learning of Harlow's story, wrote about him in his book Specimen Days.

After four hours, the Confederate attack lost momentum, and their forces began to pull back into Fort Stedman. An overwhelming Union counterattack eventually recaptured the fort. The 29th took part in the counterattack, re-capturing Battery 11. Color-bearer Conrad Homan of the 29th was the first to re-enter Battery 11 and was later awarded the Medal of Honor. The regiment lost 10 killed and an unknown number of captured in this engagement.

== Mustering out ==
The 29th did not take part in the pursuit of Lee's army during the Appomattox Campaign. The small regiment was instead withdrawn to Washington shortly after Lee's surrender and served as provost guards in the capital. On August 11, 1865, the 29th was mustered out of service. Approximately 173 of its members (roughly 15 percent) were killed in action or died of wounds or disease. Official numbers as to the number of wounded are not available. The unit served in 15 states and traveled more than 4,200 miles (6,800 km). Taking into account the seven months of duty served prior to the official formation of the regiment, plus a term of reenlistment served by many members, the 29th Massachusetts had one of the longest terms of service of any Massachusetts regiment, a total of four years and three months.

== See also ==
- Massachusetts in the Civil War
- List of Massachusetts Civil War units
