= Samuel C. Wright =

Samuel Cole Wright
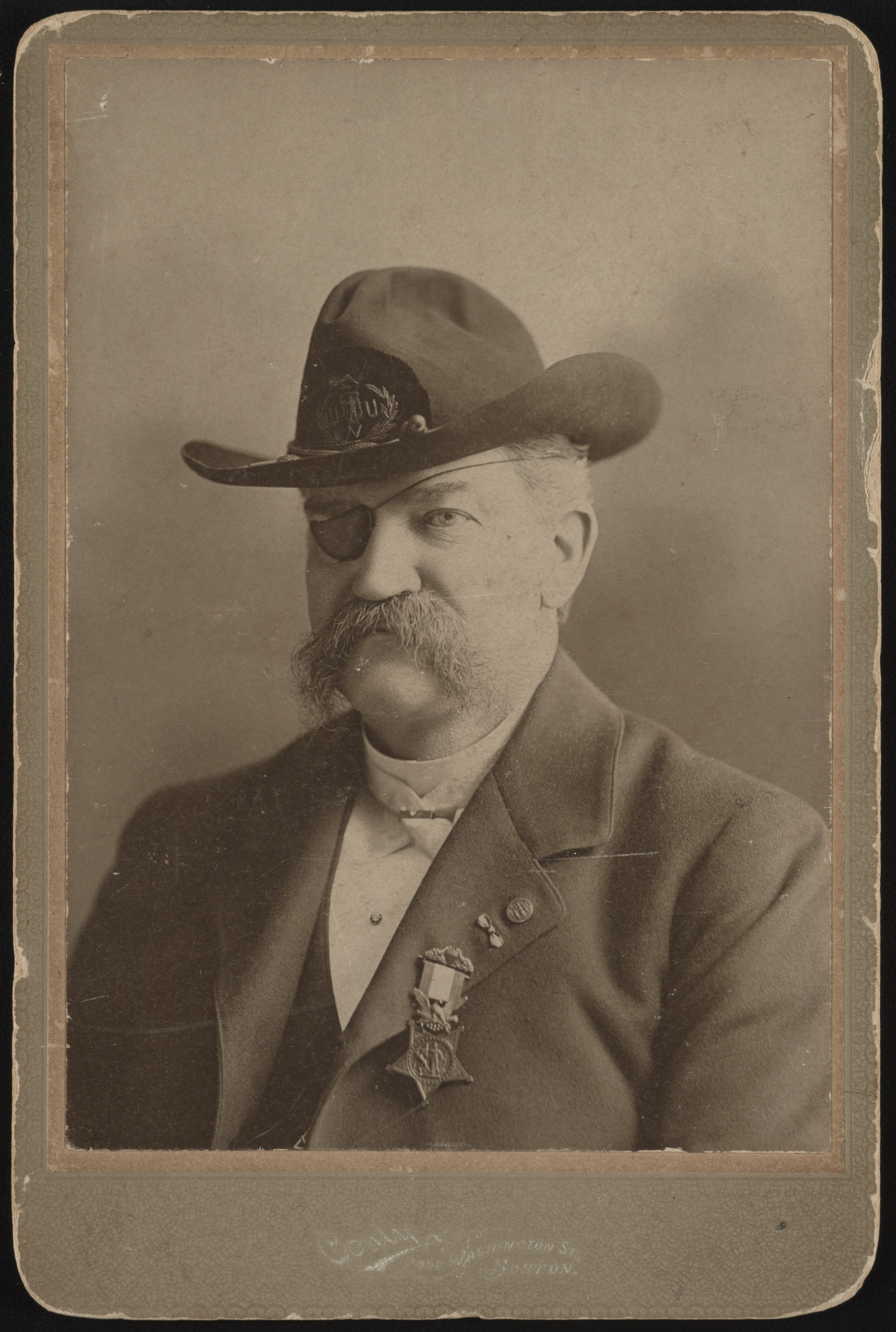
- Born: September 29, 1842; Plympton, Massachusetts
- Died: July 7, 1906 (aged 63); Plympton, Massachusetts
- Burial place: Oak Grove Cemetery, Plymouth, Massachusetts
- Military career
- Allegiance: (United States) Union
- Branch: Union Army
- Service years: 1861–1865
- Rank: Sergeant
- Unit: 29th Regiment Massachusetts Volunteer Infantry
- Conflicts: American Civil War
- Awards: Medal of Honor

Samuel Cole Wright (September 29, 1842 – July 7, 1906) was a sergeant in the Union Army during the American Civil War.

Wright served with the 29th Regiment Massachusetts Volunteer Infantry, participated in 30 battles, was wounded five times and twice reported dead. For his actions during the Battle of Antietam he received the Medal of Honor on January 29, 1896.

== Civil War service ==
Wright initially enlisted as a private in the 3rd Massachusetts Militia in May 1861 and was transferred to the 29th Massachusetts Infantry when that regiment was formed in December 1861. He participated with the 29th Massachusetts in the Peninsular Campaign during which he was wounded in the head by a shell fragment at the Battle of White Oak Swamp on June 30, 1862.

During the Battle of Antietam on September 17, 1862, the 29th Massachusetts served with the Irish Brigade. As the brigade advanced on the Confederate position at the so-called "Bloody Lane," their progress was impeded by a split rail fence. Brigadier General Thomas Francis Meagher, commanding the Irish Brigade, called for volunteers to tear down the fence.

Years later, Wright described the episode as follows:

Some 200 yards in advance of our position, which we were holding at a terrible cost, was a fence built high and strong. The troops in advance had tried to scale the fence and reform under that hell of fire. They were actually torn in shreds and wedged into the fence. The cry came to us for volunteers to pull down the fence. Instantly there sprang from the long line, fast being shortened as the ranks closed up over the dead, seventy-six volunteers. We ran straight for the fence amid a hail of iron and lead, the dead falling all about us, but to reach the fence was our only thought. A part of the force reached it, and, as one would grasp a rail it would be sent flying out of his hands by rifle-shots. The fence leveled, we made the attempt to return, and it was as hot for us on the retreat, as it had been on the advance. Few escaped death or wounds. I had almost regained my regiment, when I was hit. The line then successfully pressed on, and the 'Sunken Road,' or ' Bloody Lane,' as it is now known, was within our lines.

Wright was shot in the left knee during this engagement but refused to be removed from the field. For his actions during the Battle of Antietam, Wright was awarded the Medal of Honor in 1896.

In October 1863, Wright was run down by a mule team but recovered from his wounds. He was shot in the left arm during the Battle of Cold Harbor on June 2, 1864. During the Battle of the Crater on July 30, 1864, he was shot through the right eye and left for dead. He recovered, however, and the bullet was removed from the back of his head. He kept the bullet as a reminder of his brush with death.

Wright received two battlefield promotions and was mustered out with the rank of sergeant on February 3, 1865.

== Post-war career ==
After the war, Wright became a storekeeper in Plympton, Massachusetts and also worked in the United States Customs office in Boston, Massachusetts. Active with various veterans organizations, Wright was designated a national color bearer by the Union Veterans Union and served on the command staff of the Massachusetts department of the Grand Army of the Republic. He also served on the executive committee of the 29th Massachusetts Regimental Association and worked through that organization to preserve portraits and photographs of members of the regiment.

He died at his home in Plympton on July 7, 1906.

== See also ==
- List of American Civil War Medal of Honor recipients
- Massachusetts in the American Civil War
