= Conrad Homan =

American Civil War soldier

- Born: February 27, 1840; Roxbury, Massachusetts
- Died: January 30, 1922 (aged 81)
- Burial place: Edwards Church Cemetery, Framingham, Massachusetts
- Military career
- Allegiance: Union; United States of America
- Branch: Union Army
- Service years: 1861 – 1865
- Rank: First Lieutenant
- Unit: 29th Regiment Massachusetts Volunteer Infantry
- Conflicts: American Civil War • Battle of the Crater
- Awards: Medal of Honor

Conrad Homan (February 27, 1840 – January 30, 1922) was a volunteer soldier in the Union Army during the American Civil War. Homan served with the 29th Regiment Massachusetts Volunteer Infantry and, for his actions during the Battle of the Crater on July 30, 1864 he received the Medal of Honor.

== Medal of Honor citation ==
Rank and organization: Color Sergeant, Company A, 29th Massachusetts Infantry.
Place and date: Near Petersburg, Va., July 30, 1864.
Entered service at:------.
Birth: Roxbury, Mass.
Date of issue: 3 June 1869.

Citation:

Fought his way through the enemy's lines with the regimental colors, the rest of the color guard being killed or captured.

== See also ==
- List of Medal of Honor recipients
- List of American Civil War Medal of Honor recipients: G–L
- Massachusetts in the American Civil War
