= 3rd Massachusetts Militia Regiment =

3rd Massachusetts Volunteer Militia Regiment
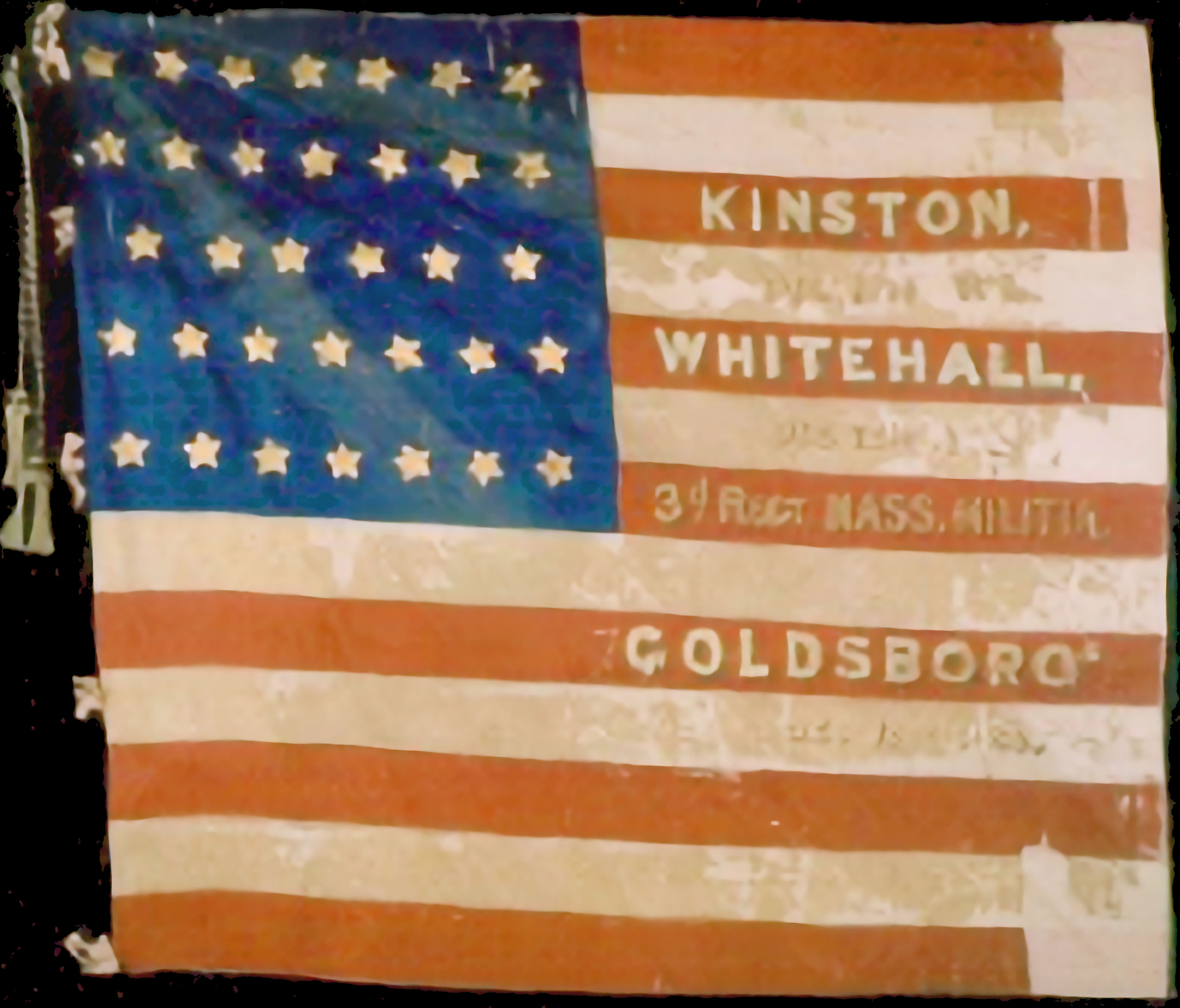
- Active: April 16, 1861–July 23, 1861 and September 23, 1862–June 26, 1863
- Country: United States of America
- Allegiance: Union
- Branch: Union Army
- Type: Infantry

Commanders
- Notable commanders: Col. David Wardrop; Col. Silas P. Richmond

The 3rd Massachusetts Volunteer Militia Regiment was a peacetime regiment of infantry that was activated for federal service in the Union Army for two separate tours during the American Civil War. The regiment consisted of companies from Plymouth and Bristol Counties.

During their first "90 days" term, the regiment mainly served garrison duty in the vicinity of Fortress Monroe on the Virginia Peninsula. Shortly after arriving in Virginia, they took part in the destruction of the Gosport Navy Yard in Norfolk, Virginia on April 20, 1861. The regiment was again activated in September 1862 for a term of nine months, training at Camp Joe Hooker in Lakeville, Massachusetts. The 3rd Massachusetts was stationed in New Bern, North Carolina, participated in several expeditions and saw minor combat including the Battle of Goldsborough Bridge and the Siege of Little Washington.

== Earlier units ==
Other units dating back to the 18th century were given the designation 3rd Regiment Massachusetts Militia. Such regiments were organized and disbanded several times. These included a regiment that was organized in 1775, served during the Revolutionary War, and fought at the Battle of Saratoga among other engagements. During the reorganization of the Massachusetts militia in 1840, the 3rd Massachusetts was designated as part of the Second Brigade of the First Division of the Volunteer Corps of Massachusetts Militia.

In 1858, Colonel David W. Wardrop of New Bedford, Massachusetts was appointed to command the 3rd Massachusetts. Wardrop had trained with the Massachusetts militia for much of his life, first with the Boston Fusiliers and later with the City Guards of New Bedford. Although not a career soldier, he was respected for his knowledge of military tactics. Wardrop commanded the unit during its first term of service in the field during the Civil War.

== 90 days term ==
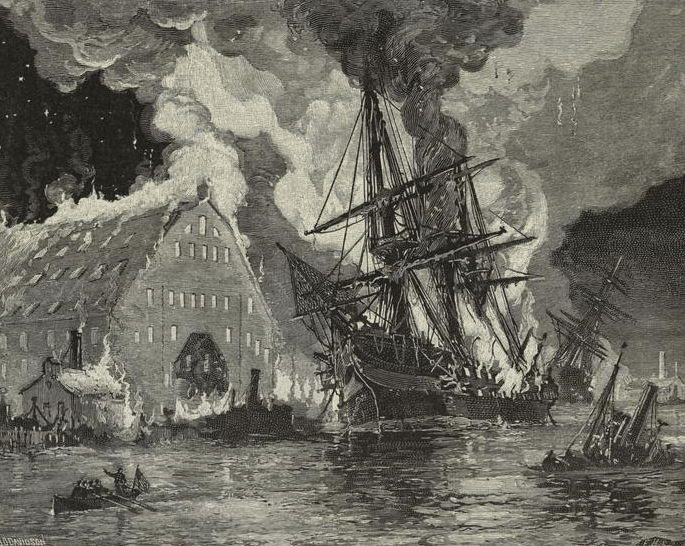
The USS Merrimack burning during the destruction of the Norfolk Navy Yard by Union troops, including the 3rd Massachusetts

The 3rd Massachusetts was organized for active service on April 15, 1861, in response to President Lincoln's call for 75,000 troops to put down the insurrection in the southern states. Despite the various companies being dispersed over a large area of southeastern Massachusetts, Col. Wardrop managed to get word to the captains under his command during the night of April 15–16. The 3rd Massachusetts was among the first Massachusetts regiments to report for service in Boston on April 16. The unit was therefore one of several Massachusetts regiments which became known as the "Minutemen of '61," in reference to the Minutemen who turned out in April 1775 during the Battles of Lexington and Concord.

The 3rd Massachusetts reported to Boston with an incomplete roster of seven out of ten companies. Three newly recruited companies were therefore added to the unit to fill out their ranks. These three new companies, primarily from the Boston area, had enlisted for three years as opposed to the 90 day service for which the bulk of the regiment had enlisted. After the 3rd Massachusetts was mustered out in July 1861, the new companies were eventually transferred to the 29th Massachusetts to serve out the remainder of their term.

The regiment arrived via ship at Fortress Monroe, a Union foothold on the Virginia coast, in the morning of April 20, 1861. That afternoon, they were loaded on board the USS Pawnee and taken to the Gosport Navy Yard across Hampton Roads at Norfolk. The Navy yard, its vessels, and valuable stores were expected to fall into Confederate hands. Therefore, the 3rd Massachusetts was given orders to set fire to all buildings, vessels and stores. Col. Wardrop felt the strategic location could be defended and offered to deploy the 3rd Massachusetts to hold the position. This request was denied and details were ordered to go about firing the Navy yard. The 3rd Massachusetts returned aboard the Pawnee which towed the USS Cumberland to Fortress Monroe, saving the frigate from falling into enemy hands. In executing this assignment, the 3rd Massachusetts claimed that they were the first Union troops to make an incursion on territory held by the Confederacy.

During May and June 1861, the 3rd Massachusetts was garrisoned at Fortress Monroe and conducted occasional patrols beyond the fort. On July 1, the regiment was ordered to occupy the town of Hampton, Virginia just four miles from the fort. Confederate forces were massing nearby at Big Bethel and the post was considered a dangerous one due to the proximity of the enemy and the secessionist sentiments of the local population. One soldier of the 3rd Massachusetts was shot and beaten while at Hampton, though he survived.

On July 16, the regiment marched to Fortess Monroe and boarded a steamship for Boston. They were mustered out at Camp Wightman on Long Island in Boston harbor on July 22.

== 9 months term ==
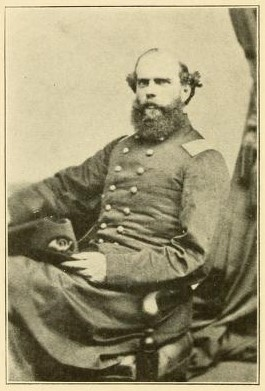
Col. Silas P. Richmond, commanding officer of the 3rd Massachusetts during its second enlistment

The regiment was again activated for federal service following Lincoln's call in August 1862 for 300,000 troops to serve for nine months. The 3rd Massachusetts reported to Camp Joe Hooker in Lakeville, Massachusetts and was mustered in on September 23, 1862. The regiment at this time was composed of newly recruited companies and was virtually a different regiment, in terms of its roster, than the original 90 day incarnation. During this term, the regiment was commanded by Col. Silas P. Richmond who had trained in the Massachusetts militia for more than ten years and fought with John Brown during the Bleeding Kansas crisis. The unit trained at Camp Joe Hooker for roughly a month, moved to Boston on October 22, 1862, and that day boarded two ships bound for Beaufort, South Carolina. From there they proceeded by rail to New Bern, North Carolina which served as the base of operations for the Union's Department of North Carolina commanded by Maj. Gen. John G. Foster.

The Union occupied several key positions along the North Carolina coast, however the interior was controlled by Confederate forces which frequently threatened or besieged Union strongholds. The 3rd Massachusetts took part in several patrols and expeditions aimed at disrupting Confederate supply lines in the interior and dislodging Confederate forces encroaching on Union positions. In November, Company I of the regiment was detached and shipped to Plymouth, North Carolina where they served garrison duty apart from the regiment for five months. Confederates attacked the Plymouth on December 10, 1862, and Company I suffered the first battle casualties of the 3rd Massachusetts—two killed, several wounded and 14 prisoners.

The most significant operation in which the 3rd Massachusetts was engaged was the Goldsborough Expedition in December 1862. Maj. Gen. Foster marched virtually all of his available forces from New Bern, numbering approximately 12,000, to disrupt the Confederate supply line to Virginia along the Wilmington and Weldon Railroad by destroying the Goldsborough Bridge (roughly 60 miles from New Bern). This expedition was executed in coordination with Maj. Gen. Ambrose Burnside's assault on Fredericksburg, Virginia. During this expedition, the regiment took part in the Battles of Kinston, White Hall and Goldsborough Bridge. The 3rd Massachusetts was engaged in only minor skirmishing during this expedition. On December 17, Foster's force reached Goldsborough and destroyed the railroad bridge. The 3rd Massachusetts destroyed approximately three miles of the Wilmington and Weldon Railroad outside of Goldsborough after which they were engaged with the enemy while part of a rear guard action. The regiment reached New Bern on December 21 having suffered casualties of six wounded.

On December 30, 1862, the regiment was assigned to Brigadier General Charles A. Heckman's brigade and prepared to march for a southward expedition to South Carolina. However, the weapons that the 3rd Massachusetts had been issued upon reaching North Carolina were of poor quality being antiquated Austrian muskets confiscated from a captured southern blockade runner. The weapons were inspected and condemned and the 3rd Massachusetts was reassigned to Col. James Jourdan's brigade occupying the defenses of New Bern. The 3rd Massachusetts was stationed at Fort Totten, guarding the land approaches to New Bern and remained with Col. Jourdan's brigade until the end of their service.

During their months serving garrison duty in the vicinity of New Bern, the 3rd Massachusetts was frequently employed in digging trenches and occasionally participated in brief expeditions and patrols. On March 6, 1863, the regiment marched on a five-day expedition with Brig. Gen. Henry Prince's division in Jones and Onslow Counties. On April 7, the regiment left New Bern, were shipped across the Neuse River and joined a column commanded by Brig. Gen. Francis B. Spinola. This column marched swiftly in an attempt to relieve Union forces and break the Siege of Little Washington. Strong resistance from Confederate artillery, however, caused the column to turn back to New Bern. This rapid expedition of thirty miles and frequent skirmishing was remembered as the most exhausting mission in which the 3rd Massachusetts took part.

The regiment left New Bern on June 11, 1863, and embarked for Boston. On reaching Boston, the men were furloughed for several days to return home and then reported to Camp Hooker on June 22. The regiment was mustered out in Lakeville on June 26, 1863.

== See also ==
- Massachusetts in the Civil War
- List of Massachusetts Civil War units
