= Camp Joe Hooker =

American Civil War training camp

Coordinates: 41°51′31.46″N 70°55′50.68″W

Camp Joe Hooker was an American Civil War training camp located in Lakeville, Massachusetts, used by the 3rd and 4th Massachusetts Volunteer Militia Regiments for training in Sept–Dec 1862.

== See also ==
- List of military installations in Massachusetts
