= Joseph S. Manning =

American Civil War Medal of Honor recipient

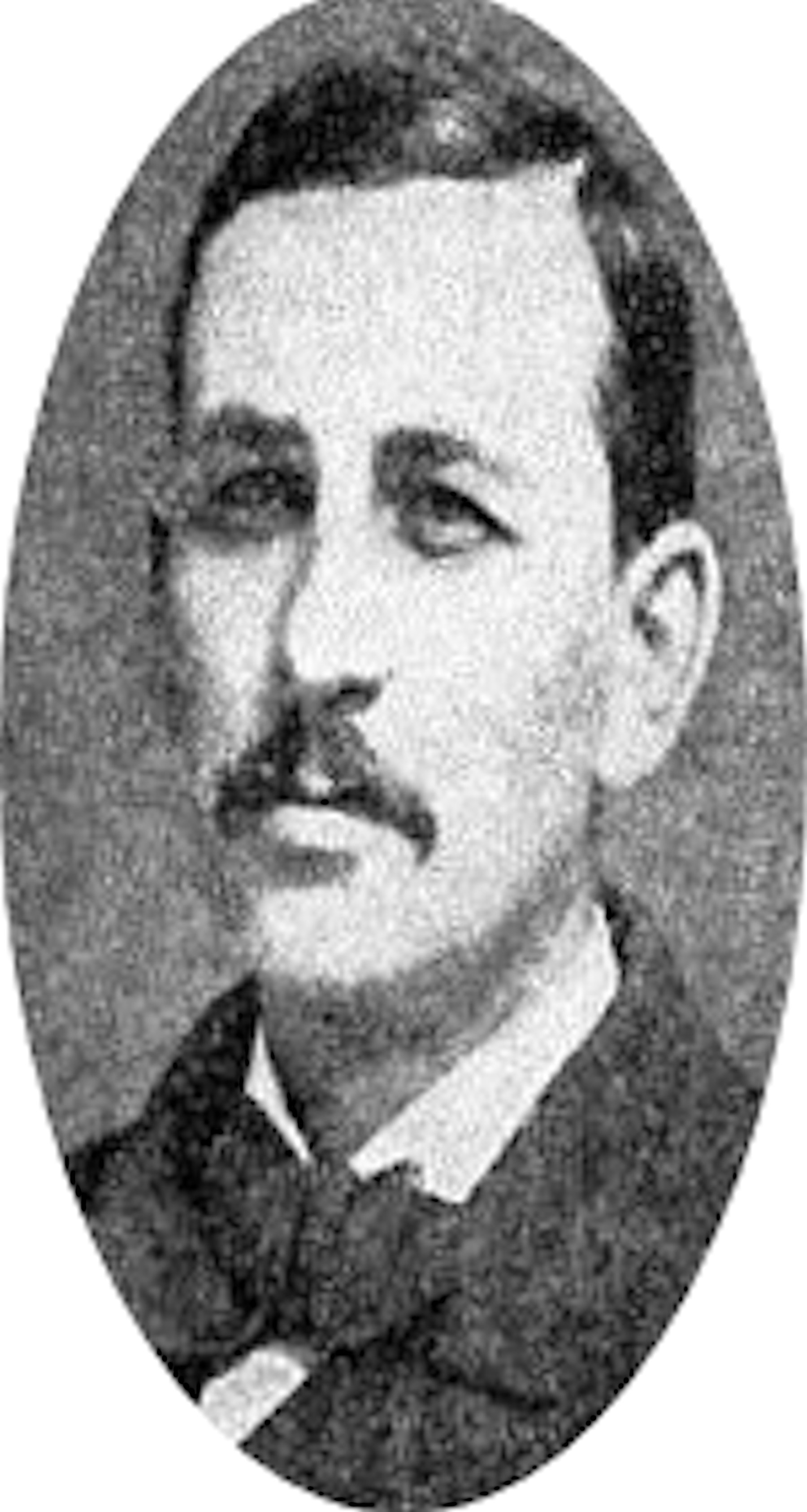
- Manning in 1895
- Born: April 13, 1845; Ipswich, Massachusetts, US
- Died: December 27, 1905 (aged 60)
- Burial place: Ipswich, Massachusetts, US
- Military career
- Allegiance: United States of America; Union
- Branch: United States Army; Union Army
- Rank: Private
- Units: Company K, 29th Massachusetts Volunteer Infantry Regiment
- Conflicts: American Civil War
- Awards: Medal of Honor

Joseph S. Manning (April 13, 1845 – December 27, 1905) was a private in the United States Army and a Medal of Honor recipient for his role in the American Civil War.

== Medal of Honor citation ==
Rank and organization: Private, Company K, 29th Massachusetts Infantry. Place and date. At Fort Sanders, Knoxville, Tenn., November 29, 1863. Entered service at:------. Birth: Ipswich, Mass. Date of issue: December 1, 1864.

Citation:

Capture of flag of 16th Georgia Infantry (C.S.A.).

== See also ==
- List of Medal of Honor recipients
- List of American Civil War Medal of Honor recipients: M–P
