= Joseph H. Barnes =

American Brevet Brigadier General (1833–1906)

Joseph Henry Barnes
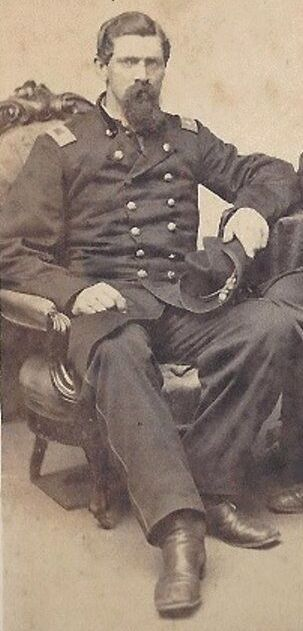
- Born: July 25, 1833; Hingham, Massachusetts, U.S.
- Died: January 10, 1906 (aged 72); Massachusetts, U.S.
- Burial place: Hingham Cemetery, Hingham, Massachusetts
- Children: 3
- Military career
- Allegiance: United States (Union)
- Branch: United States Army (Union Army)
- Service years: 1861 – 1864
- Rank: Colonel; Bvt. Brigadier General
- Commands: 29th Massachusetts Infantry Regiment
- Conflicts: American Civil War; Manassas campaign; First Battle of Bull Run; Peninsula campaign; Battle of White Oak Swamp (WIA); Maryland campaign; Battle of Antietam; Siege of Petersburg; Battle of the Crater; Battle of Globe Tavern

Joseph Henry Barnes (1833–1906) was an American Brevet Brigadier General who commanded the 29th Massachusetts Infantry Regiment during the Eastern Theater of the American Civil War.

== Biography ==
=== Early life ===
Joseph was born on July 25, 1833. He moved to East Boston some time later and became a printer before the outbreak of the American Civil War. He also married Anna Delia Stickney and later had 3 children.

=== American Civil War ===
Barnes raised a militia consisting of East Bostonians known as the "Greenough Guards" by Governor John Albion Andrew himself before being commissioned for Federal Service on May 18, 1861, and made a captain of Company C of the 1st Massachusetts Infantry Regiment on May 22 and shortly after, participated at the First Battle of Bull Run. Barnes was then made Lieutenant Colonel of the newly formed 29th Massachusetts Infantry Regiment on December 13, 1861, as he led Company K of the regiment.

Barnes then became the main commander of the regiment after Colonel Ebenezer W. Peirce was considered absent but was wounded at the Battle of White Oak Swamp and was recovering but managed to participate at the Battle of Antietam as the regiment was part of the Irish Brigade during the assault on the Sunken Road. After the two battles, the 29th Massachusetts became a part of the IX Corps and continued to command in the Siege of Petersburg such as in the Battle of the Crater before he was honorably mustered out on October 9, 1864. He was brevetted to Brigadier General on August 19, 1864, for his services at the Battle of Globe Tavern.

=== Later years ===
After the war, Barnes would serve as the Deputy Collector of the Port of Boston from 1880 to 1900. He was also associated with veteran associations as well as a member of the Military Order of the Loyal Legion of the United States and the Grand Army of the Republic.

== See also ==
- List of American Civil War brevet generals (Union)
