= DeGraffenried Park Historic District =

Historic district in North Carolina, United States

- U.S. National Register of Historic Places
- U.S. Historic district
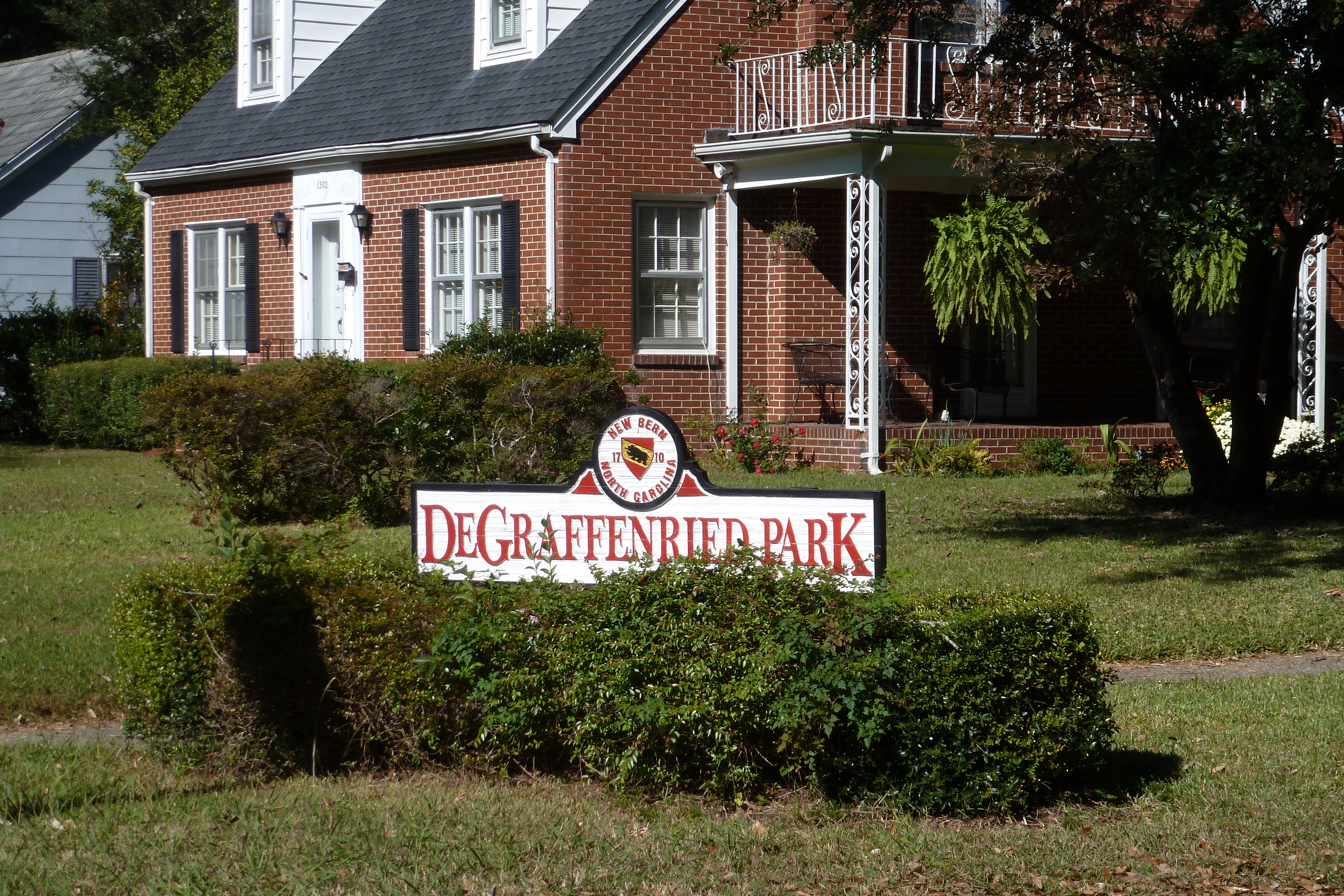
- DeGraffenried Park Historic District, October 2012

- Location within North Carolina Location within the United States
- Location: Roughly bounded by Neuse Blvd., Fort Totten Dr., Trent Rd. and Chattawka Ln., New Bern, North Carolina
- Coordinates: 35°6′27″N 77°3′38″W
- Area: 21 acres (8.5 ha)
- Built: 1927
- Architect: Fuson, Raymond; Hines, B.G. et al.
- Architectural style: Colonial Revival, Tudor Revival, et al.
- NRHP reference No.: 06000689
- Added to NRHP: August 9, 2006

DeGraffenried Park Historic District is a national historic district located at New Bern, Craven County, North Carolina. It encompasses 86 contributing buildings and 1 contributing site in a residential section of New Bern developed between 1926 and 1956. The district is characterized by dwellings in the Colonial Revival and Tudor Revival styles. Located in the district is the site of DeGraffenried Park.

It was listed on the National Register of Historic Places in 2006.
