= 4th Massachusetts Militia Regiment =

4th Regiment Massachusetts Volunteer Militia
- Active: April 16, 1861–July 22, 1861 and September 23, 1862–August 28, 1863
- Country: United States of America
- Allegiance: Union
- Branch: Union Army
- Type: Infantry

Commanders
- Notable commanders: Col. Abner B. Packard; Col. Henry Walker

The 4th Regiment Massachusetts Volunteer Militia, sometimes known as the 4th Massachusetts Infantry, was a peacetime regiment of infantry that was activated for federal service in the Union Army for two separate tours during the American Civil War. Most of the companies were from Norfolk County, Massachusetts. The regiment had its headquarters in Quincy, Massachusetts.

During their first "90 days" term, the regiment was deployed to reinforce Fortress Monroe on the Virginia Peninsula and earned the distinction of being the first volunteer Union Army regiment to set foot on seceded territory. After serving months of garrison duty, five of the regiment's nine companies took part in the Battle of Big Bethel on June 10, 1861. After serving additional garrison duty in Hampton, Virginia, the regiment returned to Boston and was mustered out on July 22, 1861.

The regiment was again activated in September 1862 for a term of nine months. The 4th Massachusetts served in Louisiana during the Siege of Port Hudson.

== Earlier units ==
Other units dating back to the 18th century were given the designation 4th Regiment Massachusetts Militia. Such regiments were distinctly unique units, organized and disbanded several times over roughly 200 years.

== 90 days term ==
Fortress Monroe, Virginia

The 4th Massachusetts was summoned for active service on April 15, 1861, in response to President Lincoln's call for 75,000 troops to put down the insurrection in the southern states. Despite the various companies being dispersed over a large area of southeastern Massachusetts, the regiment was present for duty in Boston on the evening of April 16 and were barracked that night in Faneuil Hall. There the unit was quickly outfitted with Springfield muskets, new overcoats, knapsacks and haversacks to replace their old gear and smoothbore muskets. They were among the first Massachusetts regiments to report for service and were the very first to depart Boston on April 17. Due to these facts, the unit became one of the six Massachusetts regiments collectively nicknamed "the Minutemen of '61," in reference to the Minutemen who turned out in April 1775 during the Battles of Lexington and Concord.

The regiment arrived via the steamship State of Maine at Fortress Monroe, a Union foothold on the Virginia coast, in the morning of April 20, 1861. The fort was then held only by a small garrison of Regular Army troops. The 4th Massachusetts were the first volunteers to reinforce Fortress Monroe as well as the first to set foot on seceded territory of the Confederacy. Virginia voted to secede just three days earlier. For more than a month, the regiment conducted uneventful garrison duty at Fortress Monroe as additional Union regiments arrived.

On May 27, 1861, the 4th Massachusetts was ordered by Major General Benjamin Butler, then in command of Union troops on the Virginia coast, to occupy newly constructed fortifications at Newport News. These fortifications came to be known as Camp Butler. At Camp Butler for the next two weeks, the 4th Massachusetts worked on expanding and improving fortifications, conducted guard duty and occasional light scouting expeditions.

On June 19, 1861, five companies of the 4th Massachusetts under the command of Major Horace O. Wittemore (consisting of about 300 men) were ordered to join several other regiments in an expedition to attack the Confederate position at Big Bethel, about 12 miles from Newport News. The Union regiments were made up of inexperienced volunteers and during the night march to Big Bethel, two New York regiments fired on one another, mistakenly believing they were firing on Confederates. Even after this debacle, which caused great disorder among many of his troops, the Union officer in command of the expedition, Brigadier General Ebenezer W. Pierce, decided to proceed with the attack. The 4th Massachusetts detachment was not involved in the friendly fire incident and was assigned to attack the Confederate left flank. They were in the process of executing these orders when Pierce ordered a retreat. The 4th Massachusetts had one man killed and two wounded.

After the Battle of Big Bethel, the 4th Massachusetts took up camp in Hampton and remained there until the end of their term. On July 15, 1861, they boarded a steamship for Boston and arrived there on July 18. The regiment was mustered out on July 22, 1861.

== 9 months term ==
The regiment was again activated for federal service following Lincoln's call in August 1862 for 300,000 troops to serve for nine months. The 4th Massachusetts reported to Camp Joe Hooker in Lakeville, Massachusetts, and was mustered in on September 23, 1862. The regiment at this time was composed of newly recruited companies and was virtually a different regiment, in terms of its roster, than the original 90 day incarnation. During this term, the regiment was commanded by Col. Henry Walker. The unit did not leave Camp Hooker until December 27 when it headed for New York en route to Louisiana.

On June 30, 1863, the unit continued to report unanimously on duty despite the term of enlistment expiring. By July 9 they had entered Port Hudson, Louisiana, at its surrender. On August 4, 1863, the unit embarked on a return to Massachusetts. They were mustered out on at Camp Joe Hooker August 28, 1863, by Lieutenant Daniel Madden.

== See also ==
- List of Massachusetts Civil War units
- Massachusetts in the Civil War
