= 1901 Massachusetts legislature =

122nd Massachusetts General Court
| ← | 121st | 123rd | → |

Overview
- Legislative body: General Court
- Election: November 6, 1900

Senate
- Members: 40
- President: Rufus A. Soule
- Party control: Republican (31—9)

House
- Members: 240
- Speaker: James J. Myers
- Party control: Republican (179–58–3)

Sessions
- 1st: January 2, 1901 – June 19, 1901 + extra session

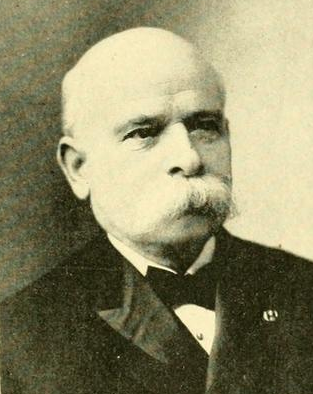
Rufus Soule, Senate president.

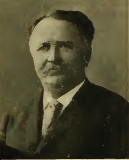
James Myers, House speaker.

Leaders of the Massachusetts General Court, 1901.

The 122nd Massachusetts General Court, consisting of the Massachusetts Senate and the Massachusetts House of Representatives, met in 1901 during the governorship of Winthrop M. Crane. Rufus A. Soule served as president of the Senate and James J. Myers served as speaker of the House.

== Senators ==
| image | name | date of birth | district |
|---|---|---|---|
| | Henry C. Attwill | March 11, 1872 | |
| | Edward F. Blodgett | August 9, 1848 | |
| | William A. Butler | February 4, 1859 | |
| | Loyed E. Chamberlain | January 30, 1857 | |
| | James B. Clancy | May 26, 1868 | |
| | George L. Clemence | February 17, 1852 | |
| | Franklin L. Codman | September 9, 1867 | |
| | Charles A. Corser | September 21, 1832 | |
| | Guy W. Currier | December 22, 1867 | |
| | Cornelius R. Day | December 29, 1847 | |
| | Thomas H. Dowd | March 24, 1872 | |
| | Frank A. Fales | October 13, 1848 | |
| | W. T. A. Fitzgerald | December 19, 1871 | |
| | Herbert E. Fletcher | May 10, 1862 | |
| | Augustus Peabody Gardner | November 5, 1865 | |
| | Francis A. Harrington | November 17, 1846 | |
| | Edward C. Holt | January 13, 1850 | |
| | Willard Howland | December 3, 1852 | |
| | Franklin E. Huntress | April 19, 1866 | |
| | George R. Jones | February 8, 1862 | |
| | Amos A. Lawrence | November 3, 1847 | |
| | Walter O. Luscombe | August 19, 1852 | |
| | Jeremiah E. Mahoney | November 8, 1864 | |
| | David Manning | August 29, 1846 | |
| | John F. Marsh | February 1, 1828 | |
| | Andrew H. Morrison | June 27, 1871 | |
| | Merrick A. Morse | May 1, 1847 | |
| | William Nutt | August 5, 1836 | |
| | John E. Parry | July 3, 1854 | |
| | J. Frank Porter | April 8, 1847 | |
| | Edward Seaver | June 3, 1849 | |
| | David B. Shaw | August 20, 1870 | |
| | Rufus Albertson Soule | 1839 | |
| | John Thomas Sparks | July 9, 1865 | |
| | Eugene H. Sprague | May 23, 1864 | |
| | John Andrew Sullivan | May 10, 1868 | |
| | William Tolman | June 2, 1858 | |
| | Chester B. Williams | October 10, 1870 | |
| | Alva S. Wood | May 12, 1828 | |

== Representatives ==
| image | name | date of birth | district |
|---|---|---|---|
| | Charles H. Adams | April 22, 1859 | |
| | Eben Timothy Adams | January 7, 1857 | |
| | Horace C. Adams | July 18, 1848 | |
| | Wilbur F. Adams | March 6, 1865 | |
| | Charles I. Albee | January 17, 1862 | |
| | Charles H. Allen | June 17, 1841 | |
| | George D. Allen | October 28, 1843 | |
| | Frank W. Amazeen | March 10, 1853 | |
| | Albert S. Apsey | November 27, 1870 | |
| | Warren P. Babb | November 10, 1850 | |
| | Frank E. Badger | January 12, 1853 | |
| | A. Dudley Bagley | February 27, 1869 | |
| | John N. Ball | November 19, 1835 | |
| | William L. Barber | April 9, 1859 | |
| | Daniel J. Barry | August 27, 1859 | |
| | Edward P. Bartlett | September 9, 1849 | |
| | Frank Bartlett | September 5, 1854 | |
| | Frederick W. Bateman | December 17, 1852 | |
| | Fred Alfred Bearse | February 15, 1871 | |
| | George C. Belcher | August 26, 1844 | |
| | Harry L. Belden | January 7, 1864 | |
| | Albion F. Bemis | July 19, 1856 | |
| | Austin Bigelow | September 8, 1840 | |
| | John Bleiler | May 9, 1837 | |
| | James F. Bliss | April 7, 1847 | |
| | Charles H. Blood | December 10, 1858 | |
| | Samuel H. Borofsky | April 25, 1865 | |
| | Ward N. Boylston | December 17, 1871 | |
| | J. Walter Bradlee | January 27, 1867 | |
| | Patrick H. Bradley | October 17, 1874 | |
| | Lewis S. Breed | November 4, 1866 | |
| | Charles P. Brewer | August 1, 1852 | |
| | Clarence A. Briggs | August 21, 1871 | |
| | William M. Brigham | January 23, 1864 | |
| | Edward L. Brown | April 3, 1861 | |
| | John A. Brown | July 7, 1844 | |
| | Henry Cushing Bulfinch | February 16, 1859 | |
| | George P. Bullard | June 25, 1857 | |
| | George Walton Bullard | May 24, 1841 | |
| | William J. Bullock | January 31, 1864 | |
| | Edward D. Bunyan | June 14, 1871 | |
| | George S. Burgess | January 30, 1876 | |
| | James Burns | May 20, 1838 | |
| | Joseph E. Buswell | August 7, 1842 | |
| | A. Webster Butler | August 22, 1858 | |
| | Dexter Butterfield | March 15, 1842 | |
| | Edward B. Callender | February 23, 1851 | |
| | Charles A. Card | October 12, 1849 | |
| | James F. Carey | August 19, 1867 | |
| | Charles A. Carruth | December 13, 1853 | |
| | John H. Casey | July 22, 1848 | |
| | Frank M. Chace | April 16, 1856 | |
| | Alfred M. Chaffee | August 16, 1859 | |
| | John F. Chase | May 19, 1871 | |
| | Edwards Cheney | May 3, 1861 | |
| | Charles Edwin Childs | July 17, 1860 | |
| | Chester W. Clark | August 9, 1851 | |
| | Amedee Cloutier | April 25, 1868 | |
| | Benjamin G. Collins | December 25, 1860 | |
| | John J. Collins | August 27, 1865 | |
| | Henry Cook | April 4, 1835 | |
| | Leroy E. Coolidge | June 12, 1847 | |
| | Thomas Laurie Creeley | May 23, 1849 | |
| | J. Howell Crosby | December 30, 1867 | |
| | William F. Dana | June 26, 1863 | |
| | Alphonso Davis | September 4, 1863 | |
| | Daniel W. Davis | October 3, 1846 | |
| | Thomas L. Davis | March 15, 1852 | |
| | Isaac C. Day | June 2, 1843 | |
| | Benjamin C. Dean | March 8, 1843 | |
| | Charles Austin Dean | March 26, 1856 | |
| | Jeremiah J. Desmond | November 3, 1867 | |
| | Frank S. Dewey, Jr. | March 22, 1857 | |
| | Thomas J. Dillon | April 20, 1869 | |
| | George H. Dinan | May 18, 1871 | |
| | Thomas Donahue | August 20, 1853 | |
| | Jeremiah F. Donovan | May 10, 1856 | |
| | John L. Donovan | June 3, 1876 | |
| | William H. Downs | December 29, 1845 | |
| | Aaron Coolidge Dowse | March 27, 1856 | |
| | Charles M. Draper | November 1, 1869 | |
| | Charles V. Dudley | September 2, 1852 | |
| | J. Lewis Ellsworth | November 8, 1848 | |
| | Freeman O. Emerson | January 12, 1859 | |
| | George H. Fall | October 19, 1858 | |
| | John F. Farrar | August 31, 1856 | |
| | John D. Fenton | July 31, 1865 | |
| | Henry M. Fern | December 23, 1862 | |
| | John F. Foster | October 22, 1862 | |
| | Frank W. Francis | September 16, 1857 | |
| | Archie N. Frost | July 26, 1872 | |
| | Louis A. Frothingham | July 13, 1871 | |
| | Fred Eugene Fuller | September 10, 1862 | |
| | Michael E. Gaddis | February 21, 1869 | |
| | Horace B. Gale | December 27, 1861 | |
| | Irving P. Gammon | September 23, 1862 | |
| | Arthur H. Gardner | August 4, 1854 | |
| | Charles N. Gardner | March 29, 1845 | |
| | Eugene Clarence Gardner | March 26, 1836 | |
| | George H. Garfield | July 18, 1858 | |
| | Richard W. Garrity | March 14, 1864 | |
| | John J. Gartland | November 27, 1871 | |
| | Frank Gerrett | February 4, 1857 | |
| | Thomas E. Gibney | June 25, 1843 | |
| | Fred C. Gilpatric | August 22, 1865 | |
| | George H. Goddard | November 24, 1844 | |
| | Eben H. Googins | July 28, 1845 | |
| | Edward T. Goward | August 10, 1862 | |
| | John G. Hagberg | August 24, 1873 | |
| | George A. Hall | November 28, 1848 | |
| | Portus B. Hancock | February 19, 1836 | |
| | Arthur Harrington | July 23, 1874 | |
| | Ulysses G. Haskell | October 3, 1863 | |
| | Richard J. Hayes | October 4, 1861 | |
| | William C. S. Healey | September 26, 1873 | |
| | Frank M. Heath | September 8, 1852 | |
| | James F. Heath | March 10, 1860 | |
| | Frederic M. Hersey | January 8, 1853 | |
| | Joseph F. Hickey | January 20, 1875 | |
| | Albert S. N. Hickford | January 24, 1859 | |
| | Alexander Holmes | July 28, 1867 | |
| | Francis J. Horgan | July 2, 1869 | |
| | Robert Howard | May 7, 1855 | |
| | James Howell | December 19, 1845 | |
| | Samuel E. Hull | August 12, 1843 | |
| | Bennett B. Humphrey | April 11, 1838 | |
| | Edward W. Hunt | November 29, 1859 | |
| | George C. Hunt | April 7, 1859 | |
| | Harry Draper Hunt | December 27, 1874 | |
| | Harrie C. Hunter | March 16, 1869 | |
| | John C. Hurley | December 19, 1875 | |
| | William A. Jenks | June 10, 1853 | |
| | Michael Bernard Jones | August 20, 1864 | |
| | Walter S. Keene | November 9, 1858 | |
| | Edward H. Keith | October 23, 1859 | |
| | Michael Kelly | June 17, 1840 | |
| | Moody Kimball | July 2, 1862 | |
| | Homer R. King | June 4, 1846 | |
| | Alfred Franklin Kinney | October 25, 1851 | |
| | Joseph S. Leach | November 14, 1860 | |
| | George F. Leslie | September 12, 1850 | |
| | Edward L. Logan | January 20, 1875 | |
| | Joseph P. Lomasney | March 10, 1863 | |
| | Melvin W. Longley | February 2, 1849 | |
| | Joseph H. Loudon | September 25, 1861 | |
| | Joseph Patrick Love | August 26, 1852 | |
| | Robert Luce | December 2, 1862 | |
| | Michael J. Lydon | September 13, 1872 | |
| | Frederic O. MacCartney | November 2, 1864 | |
| | William A. MacCord | March 14, 1871 | |
| | Thomas Mackey | August 6, 1865 | |
| | John T. Maloney | July 14, 1853 | |
| | John J. Mansfield | October 10, 1869 | |
| | William H. Marnell | August 8, 1869 | |
| | J. Manuel Marshall | June 1, 1869 | |
| | James H. McInerney | December 13, 1871 | |
| | James H. McKinley | May 21, 1860 | |
| | William S. McNary | March 29, 1863 | |
| | Charles J. McPherson | February 20, 1856 | |
| | Edward C. Mead | December 25, 1858 | |
| | Alexander Cheny Methven | November 7, 1864 | |
| | Bernard Francis Mitchell | March 30, 1867 | |
| | Francis C. Montague | August 5, 1859 | |
| | James A. Montgomery | May 17, 1864 | |
| | William L. Mooney | February 16, 1867 | |
| | J. Myron Moore | November 3, 1866 | |
| | Harold P. Moseley | November 13, 1871 | |
| | James J. Myers | November 20, 1842 | |
| | Arthur E. Newcomb | January 31, 1872 | |
| | H. Huestis Newton | December 2, 1860 | |
| | George Augustus Nickerson | January 12, 1854 | |
| | John Nightingale | September 6, 1838 | |
| | William S. O'Brien | August 16, 1856 | |
| | John E. O'Neill | January 15, 1862 | |
| | James E. Odlin | April 9, 1857 | |
| | James Ord | September 11, 1843 | |
| | Edward L. Osgood | August 6, 1844 | |
| | Harold S. Packard | October 16, 1860 | |
| | Timothy Paige | July 14, 1851 | |
| | Fordis C. Parker | January 3, 1868 | |
| | William H. Parker | November 10, 1863 | |
| | James Pearce | May 7, 1843 | |
| | Arthur K. Peck | September 24, 1867 | |
| | William Perkins | January 4, 1854 | |
| | John Q. A. Pettengill | July 12, 1856 | |
| | Wellington Pool | July 5, 1831 | |
| | James C. Poor | June 25, 1851 | |
| | Charles H. Preston | March 22, 1863 | |
| | John H. Quinlan | February 29, 1864 | |
| | Frank H. Radford | June 29, 1859 | |
| | Silas Dean Reed | June 25, 1872 | |
| | Samuel Roads, Jr. | October 22, 1853 | |
| | Arthur E. Roberts | June 22, 1861 | |
| | William J. Rounds | June 24, 1855 | |
| | Arthur P. Russell | June 16, 1871 | |
| | William R. Salter | July 6, 1861 | |
| | Charles R. Saunders | November 22, 1862 | |
| | William Schofield | February 14, 1857 | |
| | Ebenezer Wallen Sheppard | May 7, 1860 | |
| | William H. Sherrill | October 26, 1857 | |
| | Harvey F. Shufelt | March 19, 1860 | |
| | Mark N. Skerrett | February 23, 1870 | |
| | George T. Sleeper | September 15, 1852 | |
| | Isaac M. Small | March 18, 1846 | |
| | Fred M. Smith | September 19, 1862 | |
| | Henry A. Smith | November 11, 1850 | |
| | J. Henry Smith | June 5, 1848 | |
| | Levi M. Snow | April 19, 1841 | |
| | Wallace Spooner | November 28, 1856 | |
| | George H. Stackpole | September 7, 1843 | |
| | Charles Ephraim Stearns | April 27, 1868 | |
| | Frank K. Stearns | November 26, 1854 | |
| | George W. Stone | August 1, 1840 | |
| | Edwin F. Stowell | July 19, 1857 | |
| | Charles S. Sullivan | June 29, 1875 | |
| | Peter F. Sullivan | June 29, 1871 | |
| | William J. Sullivan | April 14, 1865 | |
| | Charles W. Swift | December 26, 1866 | |
| | Arthur M. Taft | January 28, 1854 | |
| | William J. Taft | May 19, 1860 | |
| | John I. Toland | September 6, 1874 | |
| | Appleton H. Torrey | December 25, 1847 | |
| | William Turtle | June 20, 1855 | |
| | Samuel Walker Twombly | July 31, 1822 | |
| | David I. Walsh | November 11, 1872 | |
| | Louis H. Warner | January 8, 1875 | |
| | William S. Warriner | July 15, 1866 | |
| | Moses C. Waterhouse | April 29, 1855 | |
| | David P. Waters | March 16, 1838 | |
| | James A. Watson | June 24, 1870 | |
| | Alvin G. Weeks | October 22, 1866 | |
| | Joseph Welch | April 7, 1851 | |
| | Frank E. Wells | January 4, 1874 | |
| | Frank E. Wetherell | December 18, 1843 | |
| | Orange Whitney | March 16, 1849 | |
| | Charles F. Wildes | October 17, 1848 | |
| | J. William Williams | June 11, 1849 | |
| | Thomas W. Williams | September 15, 1865 | |
| | Gordon Willis | January 13, 1851 | |
| | James Irish Wingate | June 4, 1837 | |

== See also ==
- 57th United States Congress
- List of Massachusetts General Courts
