= 1900 Massachusetts legislature =

121st Massachusetts General Court
←	120th	122nd	→

Overview
- Legislative body: General Court
- Election: November 7, 1899

Senate
- Members: 40
- President: George Edwin Smith
- Party control: Republican (31–9)

House
- Members: 240
- Speaker: James J. Myers
- Party control: Republican (166–68–2)

Sessions
- 1st: January 3, 1900 – July 17, 1900

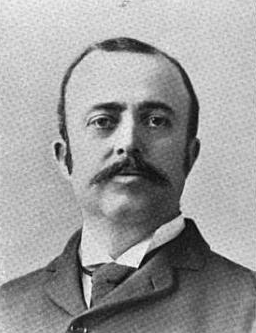
George Smith, Senate president.

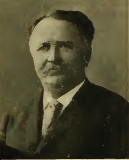
James Myers, House speaker.

Leaders of the Massachusetts General Court, 1900.

The 121st Massachusetts General Court, consisting of the Massachusetts Senate and the Massachusetts House of Representatives, met in 1900 during the governorship of Winthrop M. Crane. George Edwin Smith served as president of the Senate and James J. Myers served as speaker of the House.

== Senators ==
image	name	date of birth	district
	Henry C. Attwill	March 11, 1872	
	John E. Baldwin	June 26, 1869	
	William A. Butler	February 4, 1859	
	Loyed E. Chamberlain	January 30, 1857	
	George L. Clemence	February 17, 1852	
	Guy W. Currier	December 22, 1867	
	Frank A. Fales	October 13, 1848	
	Augustus Peabody Gardner	November 5, 1865	
	Samuel S. Gleason	May 1, 1842	
	Charles H. Hanson	July 7, 1844	
	Francis A. Harrington	November 17, 1846	
	Charles W. Hazelton	October 31, 1848	
	Franklin E. Huntress	April 19, 1866	
	Charles Hiller Innes	August 6, 1870	
	Fred Joy	July 8, 1859	
	John A. Keliher	November 6, 1866	
	Thomas W. Kenefick	September 17, 1855	
	Amos A. Lawrence	November 3, 1847	
	Warren S. Leach	February 23, 1847	
	William H. Lott	September 17, 1852	
	Walter O. Luscombe	August 19, 1852	
	Jeremiah E. Mahoney	November 8, 1864	
	William B. Mahoney	December 5, 1857	
	Arthur A. Maxwell	January 24, 1858	
	John E. McClellan	September 5, 1847	
	William Moran	September 6, 1855	
	John E. Parry	July 3, 1854	
	Frank A. Patch	July 23, 1844	
	Thomas Post	August 16, 1834	
	Albert Hoyt Ray	May 24, 1865	
	William Reynolds	June 15, 1843	
	Leonard W. Ross	October 5, 1856	
	Howard K. Sanderson	July 10, 1865	
	George Edwin Smith	April 5, 1849	
	Rufus Albertson Soule	1839	
	Peter Francis Tague	June 4, 1871	
	William Tolman	June 2, 1858	
	Charles G. Washburn	January 28, 1857	
	Charles T. Witt	July 18, 1848	
	Benjamin Herbert Woodsum	October 4, 1857	

== Representatives ==
image	name	date of birth	district
	Charles H. Adams	April 22, 1859	
	Elliot J. Aldrich	November 4, 1836	
	Charles H. Allen	June 17, 1841	
	Butler Ames	August 22, 1871	
	Albert S. Apsey	November 27, 1870	
	A. Dudley Bagley	February 27, 1869	
	George Balcom	January 23, 1832	
	John N. Ball	November 19, 1835	
	William L. Barber	April 9, 1859	
	Frank Bartlett	September 5, 1854	
	Frederick H. Bates	September 15, 1857	
	Charles C. Beebe	August 11, 1851	
	George C. Belcher	August 26, 1844	
	Harry L. Belden	January 7, 1864	
	Frank P. Bennett	May 2, 1853	
	Austin Bigelow	September 8, 1840	
	John Bleiler	May 9, 1837	
	James F. Bliss	April 7, 1847	
	Charles H. Blood	December 10, 1858	
	Samuel H. Borofsky	April 25, 1865	
	Clarence A. Briggs	August 21, 1871	
	William M. Brigham	January 23, 1864	
	Charles C. Brooks	May 3, 1851	
	Edward L. Brown	April 3, 1861	
	Henry L. Brown	January 10, 1840	
	Willard Madison Brown	April 24, 1861	
	Nelson Aluren Bugbee	August 8, 1853	
	Henry Cushing Bulfinch	February 16, 1859	
	William J. Bullock	January 31, 1864	
	Melancthon W. Burlen	September 24, 1852	
	Willard A. Burnham	October 1, 1841	
	James Burns	May 20, 1838	
	Lester L. Burrington	March 24, 1838	
	Joseph E. Buswell	August 7, 1842	
	A. Webster Butler	August 22, 1858	
	Charles A. Card	October 12, 1849	
	James F. Carey	August 19, 1867	
	George Henry Carleton	August 6, 1840	
	Charles A. Carruth	December 13, 1853	
	John H. Casey	July 22, 1848	
	N. Henry Chadwick	March 17, 1838	
	Henry L. Chase	February 5, 1853	
	Arthur Clark	August 30, 1877	
	Amedee Cloutier	April 25, 1868	
	Arthur H. Cluer	April 12, 1853	
	John H. Colby	January 13, 1862	
	Joseph L. Cole	March 26, 1842	
	Robert Eugene Conwell	June 12, 1854	
	Clifford A. Cook	September 3, 1860	
	Daniel S. Coolidge	September 21, 1845	
	Samuel Verry Crane	October 4, 1855	
	Aaron S. Crosby	October 6, 1842	
	J. Howell Crosby	December 30, 1867	
	Thomas F. I. Curley	June 22, 1864	
	J. Frank Dalton	April 19, 1842	
	William Daly	April 3, 1864	
	William Aiken Davenport	October 23, 1869	
	Daniel W. Davis	October 3, 1846	
	Thomas L. Davis	March 15, 1852	
	William Ripley Davis	March 8, 1862	
	Benjamin C. Dean	March 8, 1843	
	Charles Austin Dean	March 26, 1856	
	Frank S. Dewey, Jr.	March 22, 1857	
	Thomas J. Dillon	April 20, 1869	
	Thomas Donahue	August 20, 1853	
	Edward J. Donovan	March 15, 1864	
	James H. Donovan	August 31, 1855	
	John L. Donovan	June 3, 1876	
	Michael J. Donovan	November 1, 1864	
	Thomas J. Dooling	January 28, 1868	
	John J. Douglass	February 9, 1873	
	George Francis Dow	January 7, 1868	
	Aaron Coolidge Dowse	March 27, 1856	
	Daniel J. Driscoll, 2d	November 20, 1868	
	Curtis Eddy	May 18, 1838	
	Charles O'M. Edson	October 23, 1857	
	J. Lewis Ellsworth	November 8, 1848	
	Freeman O. Emerson	January 12, 1859	
	Charles O. Engstrom	May 19, 1875	
	Augustine W. Esleeck	March 28, 1848	
	Warren E. Fairbanks	August 28, 1854	
	George H. Fall	October 19, 1858	
	Frederick W. Farwell	November 29, 1854	
	William H. Feiker	March 11, 1870	
	George R. Fessenden	December 6, 1849	
	Frank E. Fitts	May 26, 1848	
	W. T. A. Fitzgerald	December 19, 1871	
	Herbert E. Fletcher	May 10, 1862	
	Frank A. Foster	February 15, 1859	
	Frank W. Francis	September 16, 1857	
	Archie N. Frost	July 26, 1872	
	Michael E. Gaddis	February 21, 1869	
	Horace B. Gale	December 27, 1861	
	Arthur H. Gardner	August 4, 1854	
	George H. Garfield	July 18, 1858	
	John J. Gartland	November 27, 1871	
	Samuel B. George	February 9, 1833	
	Thomas E. Gibney	June 25, 1843	
	Fred C. Gilpatric	August 22, 1865	
	David J. Gleason	July 14, 1864	
	Albert M. Goulding	May 17, 1844	
	Thomas H. Green	March 17, 1847	
	John G. Hagberg	August 24, 1873	
	George R. Hamant	March 11, 1843	
	Portus B. Hancock	February 19, 1836	
	George H. Hapgood	April 20, 1842	
	Arthur Harrington	July 23, 1874	
	Benjamin C. Harvey	September 4, 1847	
	Ulysses G. Haskell	October 3, 1863	
	Frederick N. Haskins	October 8, 1863	
	Richard J. Hayes	October 4, 1861	
	Charles E. Haywood	October 11, 1868	
	James F. Heath	March 10, 1860	
	Francis D. Henderson	March 6, 1847	
	William F. Herron	August 8, 1864	
	Frederic M. Hersey	January 8, 1853	
	Martin P. Higgins	October 16, 1857	
	William Hopewell	June 24, 1867	
	Francis J. Horgan	July 2, 1869	
	Carleton F. How	April 20, 1863	
	James Howell	December 19, 1845	
	Willard Howland	December 3, 1852	
	Edwin A. Hubbard	November 26, 1848	
	Samuel E. Hull	August 12, 1843	
	Bennett B. Humphrey	April 11, 1838	
	Edward W. Hunt	November 29, 1859	
	Harry Draper Hunt	December 27, 1874	
	James Hunt	January 27, 1833	
	Michael Bernard Jones	August 20, 1864	
	John E. Kavenaugh	October 19, 1864	
	Walter S. Keene	November 9, 1858	
	Charles P. Keith	March 14, 1843	
	Edward H. Keith	October 23, 1859	
	Michael Kelly	June 17, 1840	
	Nicholas B. Keyou	April 25, 1828	
	Charles Francis King	January 29, 1871	
	Walter C. Knowlton	July 12, 1860	
	William S. Kyle	July 12, 1851	
	John Philip Lanergan	December 31, 1874	
	John T. Langford	February 8, 1842	
	Robert H. Leland	March 9, 1865	
	Jacob A. Leonard	December 19, 1845	
	George F. Leslie	September 12, 1850	
	William C. Litchfield	March 31, 1840	
	Joseph Patrick Love	August 26, 1852	
	Michael J. Lydon	September 13, 1872	
	Frederic O. MacCartney	November 2, 1864	
	William A. MacCord	March 14, 1871	
	William E. Mahoney	May 15, 1872	
	Frederick C. Mahony	January 18, 1875	
	David Manning	August 29, 1846	
	John J. Mansfield	October 10, 1869	
	Matthew M. Mansfield	September 25, 1866	
	Charles S. Marchant	August 31, 1845	
	John F. Marsh	February 1, 1828	
	J. Manuel Marshall	June 1, 1869	
	Jeremiah F. McCarthy	July 7, 1857	
	Daniel V. McIsaac	November 6, 1871	
	James H. McKinley	May 21, 1860	
	William I. McLoughlin	January 16, 1872	
	William S. McNary	March 29, 1863	
	Charles J. McPherson	February 20, 1856	
	Edward C. Mead	December 25, 1858	
	James H. Mellen	November 7, 1845	
	Charles P. Mills	August 22, 1853	
	Edwin J. Mills	May 1, 1861	
	Cornelius Minihan	August 15, 1862	
	John M. Minton	March 23, 1872	
	James A. Montgomery	May 17, 1864	
	William L. Mooney	February 16, 1867	
	J. Myron Moore	November 3, 1866	
	Merrick A. Morse	May 1, 1847	
	John P. Munroe	June 28, 1850	
	Mortimer D. A. Murphy	May 9, 1867	
	James J. Myers	November 20, 1842	
	H. Huestis Newton	December 2, 1860	
	Darius M. Nickerson, Jr.	July 11, 1863	
	William S. O'Brien	August 16, 1856	
	John E. O'Neill	January 15, 1862	
	James E. Odlin	April 9, 1857	
	Timothy Paige	July 14, 1851	
	William Colvard Parker	April 12, 1858	
	Alexander Sinclair Paton	November 20, 1854	
	James Pearce	May 7, 1843	
	Charles H. Persons	January 5, 1859	
	John Q. A. Pettengill	July 12, 1856	
	James C. Poor	June 25, 1851	
	Thomas F. Porter	October 30, 1847	
	Silas Dean Reed	June 25, 1872	
	George Robert Russell Rivers	May 28, 1853	
	Samuel Roads, Jr.	October 22, 1853	
	Martin Robbins	October 13, 1852	
	Arthur E. Roberts	June 22, 1861	
	Lewis D. Robinson	June 21, 1842	
	Arthur P. Russell	June 16, 1871	
	William R. Salter	July 6, 1861	
	Charles R. Saunders	November 22, 1862	
	William Schofield	February 14, 1857	
	George Shepley Selfridge	September 25, 1868	
	Ebenezer Wallen Sheppard	May 7, 1860	
	Harvey F. Shufelt	March 19, 1860	
	Henry R. Skinner	May 9, 1860	
	Charles F. A. Smith	July 18, 1866	
	George E. Smith	March 18, 1848	
	Levi M. Snow	April 19, 1841	
	John Thomas Sparks	July 9, 1865	
	Stillman J. Spear	April 25, 1839	
	Wallace Spooner	November 28, 1856	
	Eugene H. Sprague	May 23, 1864	
	George H. Stackpole	September 7, 1843	
	Hugh L. Stalker	December 31, 1857	
	Silas A. Stone	February 3, 1843	
	Willmore B. Stone	June 24, 1853	
	Charles S. Sullivan	June 29, 1875	
	Michael J. Sullivan	October 23, 1870	
	French O. J. Tarbox	September 2, 1861	
	Charles T. Tatman	December 16, 1871	
	John E. Thomson	September 22, 1861	
	Edward M. Thurston	July 18, 1832	
	Patrick H. Tobin	September 12, 1870	
	William Turtle	June 20, 1855	
	Samuel Walker Twombly	July 31, 1822	
	Charles H. Upson	June 4, 1848	
	George E. Varney	July 8, 1864	
	David I. Walsh	November 11, 1872	
	William S. Warriner	July 15, 1866	
	James A. Watson	June 24, 1870	
	Walter S. Watson	September 11, 1851	
	Alvin G. Weeks	October 22, 1866	
	Walter S. Weston	November 12, 1852	
	Frank E. Wetherell	December 18, 1843	
	Harry Bertram Whall	September 5, 1868	
	William D. Wheeler	May 7, 1868	
	John B. Whelan	February 19, 1864	
	Horace C. White	January 26, 1836	
	Orange Whitney	March 16, 1849	
	Edward E. Willard	September 25, 1862	
	Temple A. Winsloe	October 14, 1875	
	Isaac C. Wright	December 21, 1824	

== See also ==
- 56th United States Congress
- List of Massachusetts General Courts
