= 1899 Massachusetts legislature =

120th Massachusetts General Court
←	119th	121st	→

Overview
- Legislative body: General Court
- Election: November 8, 1898

Senate
- Members: 40
- President: George Edwin Smith
- Party control: Republican (33–7)

House
- Members: 240
- Speaker: John L. Bates
- Party control: Republican (168–64–8)

Sessions
- 1st: January 4, 1899 – June 3, 1899

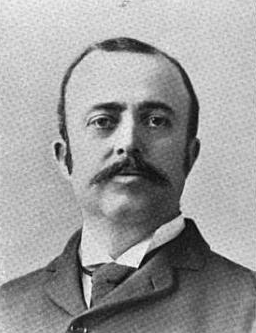
George Smith, Senate president.

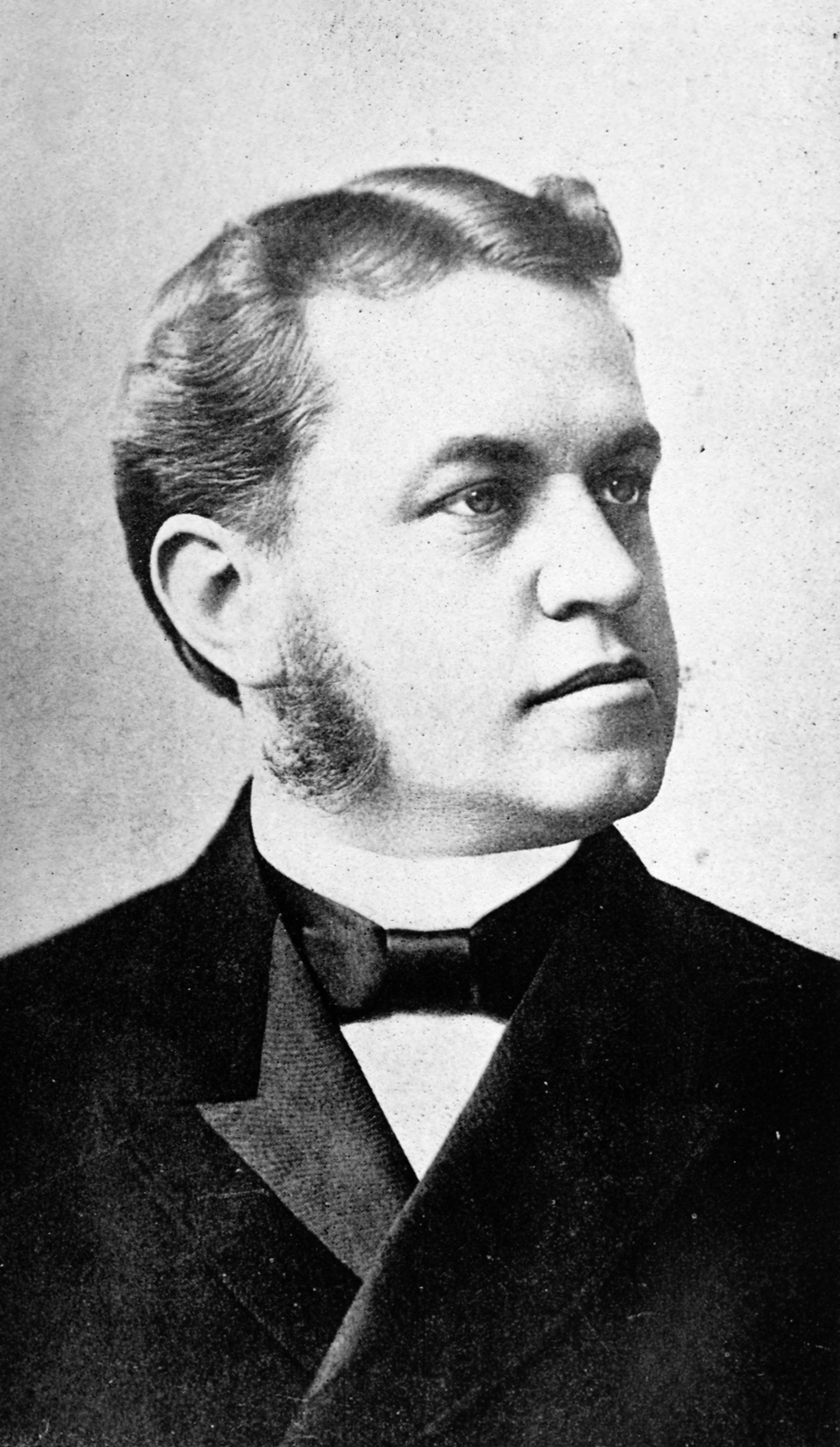
John Bates, House speaker.

Leaders of the Massachusetts General Court, 1899.

The 120th Massachusetts General Court, consisting of the Massachusetts Senate and the Massachusetts House of Representatives, met in 1899 during the governorship of Roger Wolcott. George Edwin Smith served as president of the Senate and John L. Bates served as speaker of the House.

== Senators ==
image	name	date of birth	district
	Henry C. Attwill	March 11, 1872	
	Charles O. Bailey	January 24, 1863	
	John E. Baldwin	June 26, 1869	
	Walter L. Bouve	October 28, 1849	
	Loyed E. Chamberlain	January 30, 1857	
	Frederick W. Dallinger	October 2, 1871	
	William J. Donovan	October 31, 1862	
	Wilson H. Fairbank	April 3, 1836	
	John J. Feneno	March 24, 1866	
	Samuel Wesley George	April 26, 1862	
	Samuel S. Gleason	May 1, 1842	
	Francis A. Harrington	November 17, 1846	
	Albert L. Harwood	September 10, 1847	
	William H. Hodgkins	June 9, 1840	
	Charles Hiller Innes	August 6, 1870	
	Fred Joy	July 8, 1859	
	John A. Keliher	November 6, 1866	
	Thomas W. Kenefick	September 17, 1855	
	Warren S. Leach	February 23, 1847	
	William H. Lott	September 17, 1852	
	Walter O. Luscombe	August 19, 1852	
	Arthur A. Maxwell	January 24, 1858	
	John E. McClellan	September 5, 1847	
	William Moran	September 6, 1855	
	Herbert C. Parsons	January 15, 1862	
	Frank A. Patch	July 23, 1844	
	Thomas Post	August 16, 1834	
	George E. Putnam	February 9, 1851	
	William Reynolds	June 15, 1843	
	Howard K. Sanderson	July 10, 1865	
	Charles F. Sargent	August 31, 1858	
	George Edwin Smith	April 5, 1849	
	Rufus Albertson Soule	1839	
	Peter Francis Tague	June 4, 1871	
	George N. Tyner	June 23, 1848	
	Charles G. Washburn	January 28, 1857	
	William A. Whittlesey	February 21, 1849	
	Fred Homer Williams	January 7, 1857	
	Charles T. Witt	July 18, 1848	
	Benjamin Herbert Woodsum	October 4, 1857	

== Representatives ==
image	name	date of birth	district
	Austin Flint Adams	July 15, 1840	
	Charles H. Adams	April 22, 1859	
	Wilfred Ainsworth	March 31, 1867	
	Butler Ames	August 22, 1871	
	David B. Andrews	August 12, 1838	
	Richard F. Andrews, Jr	April 13, 1863	
	Albert S. Apsey	November 27, 1870	
	George Balcom	January 23, 1832	
	Edwin Bartlett	October 25, 1833	
	John L. Bates	September 18, 1859	
	David W. Battles	January 20, 1854	
	Frank P. Bennett	May 2, 1853	
	John Bleiler	May 9, 1837	
	Charles H. Blood	December 10, 1858	
	Ward N. Boylston	December 17, 1871	
	Hugh W. Bresnahan	November 25, 1869	
	William Bridgeo	October 14, 1849	
	Clarence A. Briggs	August 21, 1871	
	William M. Brigham	January 23, 1864	
	Charles C. Brooks	May 3, 1851	
	Henry L. Brown	January 10, 1840	
	Willard Madison Brown	April 24, 1861	
	Nelson Aluren Bugbee	August 8, 1853	
	William J. Bullock	January 31, 1864	
	Albert H. Burgess	May 19, 1843	
	Lester L. Burrington	March 24, 1838	
	S. Hopkins Bushnell	October 6, 1834	
	Andrew Campbell	May 3, 1826	
	James F. Carey	August 19, 1867	
	George Henry Carleton	August 6, 1840	
	N. Henry Chadwick	March 17, 1838	
	Leonard B. Chandler	August 29, 1851	
	William D. Chapple	August 6, 1868	
	Henry L. Chase	February 5, 1853	
	Charles S. Clerke	January 10, 1850	
	Arthur H. Cluer	April 12, 1853	
	Samuel Cole	December 15, 1856	
	Thomas A. Conroy	September 9, 1869	
	Robert Eugene Conwell	June 12, 1854	
	Clifford A. Cook	September 3, 1860	
	Daniel S. Coolidge	September 21, 1845	
	Charles V. Corey	July 8, 1838	
	Aaron S. Crosby	October 6, 1842	
	Alfred R. Crosby	August 30, 1838	
	J. Howell Crosby	December 30, 1867	
	Charles S. Crouch	1833	
	Richard Cullinane	February 2, 1859	
	Guy W. Currier	December 22, 1867	
	J. Frank Dalton	April 19, 1842	
	William Daly	April 3, 1864	
	William Aiken Davenport	October 23, 1869	
	Daniel W. Davis	October 3, 1846	
	William Ripley Davis	March 8, 1862	
	Benjamin C. Dean	March 8, 1843	
	Charles Austin Dean	March 26, 1856	
	George Z. Dean	February 22, 1844	
	Frank S. Dewey, Jr.	March 22, 1857	
	Thomas J. Dillon	April 20, 1869	
	Thomas Donahue	August 20, 1853	
	Edward J. Donovan	March 15, 1864	
	Eugene E. Donovan	November 21, 1858	
	James H. Donovan	August 31, 1855	
	Michael J. Donovan	November 1, 1864	
	Thomas J. Dooling	January 28, 1868	
	John J. Douglass	February 9, 1873	
	Frederic P. Drake	March 16, 1851	
	Daniel J. Driscoll, 2d	November 20, 1868	
	George J. Dudley	February 17, 1849	
	John B. Dumond	December 25, 1862	
	George N. Dyer	December 17, 1850	
	Curtis Eddy	May 18, 1838	
	J. Lewis Ellsworth	November 8, 1848	
	Eugene B. Estes	December 7, 1850	
	Frederick W. Farwell	November 29, 1854	
	John Favor	March 1, 1859	
	William H. Feiker	March 11, 1870	
	George E. Fisher	January 22, 1823	
	Frank E. Fitts	May 26, 1848	
	W. T. A. Fitzgerald	December 19, 1871	
	John J. Flanagan	December 4, 1869	
	Albert T. Folsom	November 9, 1831	
	Frank A. Foster	February 15, 1859	
	Frank W. Francis	September 16, 1857	
	Archie N. Frost	July 26, 1872	
	Michael E. Gaddis	February 21, 1869	
	John J. Gartland	November 27, 1871	
	Fred C. Gilpatric	August 22, 1865	
	Albert M. Goulding	May 17, 1844	
	Oliver S. Grant	April 30, 1866	
	Thomas H. Green	March 17, 1847	
	James Wilson Grimes	November 21, 1865	
	John G. Hagberg	August 24, 1873	
	Portus B. Hancock	February 19, 1836	
	Franklin P. Harlow		
	Charles H. Harriman	November 16, 1852	
	Elisha T. Harvell	December 18, 1841	
	Robert B. Harvie	October 28, 1841	
	George F. Harwood	July 7, 1844	
	Herbert J. Harwood	September 6, 1854	
	Leander Miller Haskins	June 20, 1842	
	Martin E. Hawes	October 25, 1834	
	William Henry Irving Hayes	June 21, 1848	
	Charles E. Haywood	October 11, 1868	
	Guilford P. Heath	September 3, 1842	
	Francis D. Henderson	March 6, 1847	
	Franklin K. Hooper	February 2, 1849	
	William Hopewell	June 24, 1867	
	Henry T. Horton	December 11, 1845	
	Robert Howard	May 7, 1855	
	Charles W. Howland	March 25, 1860	
	Willard Howland	December 3, 1852	
	James Hunt	January 27, 1833	
	Franklin E. Huntress	April 19, 1866	
	Charles R. Johnson	December 28, 1852	
	Michael Bernard Jones	August 20, 1864	
	William E. Judd	September 3, 1855	
	Daniel Joseph Kane	April 14, 1872	
	John E. Kavenaugh	October 19, 1864	
	Charles P. Keith	March 14, 1843	
	William Kells, Jr.	October 23, 1861	
	Nicholas B. Keyou	April 25, 1828	
	Charles Francis King	January 29, 1871	
	Randolph V. King	January 20, 1853	
	William S. Kyle	July 12, 1851	
	John Philip Lanergan	December 31, 1874	
	John T. Langford	February 8, 1842	
	Addison P. Learoyd	February 11, 1838	
	Francis Leland	October 3, 1839	
	George F. Leslie	September 12, 1850	
	John F. Libby	February 3, 1863	
	James A. Litchfield	March 14, 1844	
	William C. Litchfield	March 31, 1840	
	Alexander Lockhart	December 22, 1854	
	Martin Lomasney	December 3, 1859	
	Edward M. Lombard	August 31, 1843	
	Joseph Patrick Love	August 26, 1852	
	John H. Lowe	January 8, 1848	
	Robert Luce	December 2, 1862	
	Thomas Mackey	August 6, 1865	
	David A. Mahoney	December 21, 1867	
	Frederick C. Mahony	January 18, 1875	
	Matthew M. Mansfield	September 25, 1866	
	Eugene Dennis Marchesseault	September 29, 1865	
	William H. Marden	May 30, 1843	
	Jeremiah F. McCarthy	July 7, 1857	
	Jeremiah Justin McCarthy	March 29, 1852	
	Daniel V. McIsaac	November 6, 1871	
	William I. McLoughlin	January 16, 1872	
	Edward C. Mead	December 25, 1858	
	James H. Mellen	November 7, 1845	
	Calvin S. Miller	December 22, 1833	
	Charles H. Miller	January 14, 1848	
	William J. Miller	June 8, 1867	
	Charles P. Mills	August 22, 1853	
	Cornelius Minihan	August 15, 1862	
	John M. Minton	March 23, 1872	
	James A. Montgomery	May 17, 1864	
	James S. Moore	May 31, 1842	
	Andrew H. Morrison	June 27, 1871	
	Merrick A. Morse	May 1, 1847	
	John P. Munroe	June 28, 1850	
	Mortimer D. A. Murphy	May 9, 1867	
	James J. Myers	November 20, 1842	
	David Neal	April 18, 1828	
	H. Huestis Newton	December 2, 1860	
	Phinehas S. Newton	August 2, 1833	
	Darius M. Nickerson, Jr.	July 11, 1863	
	William Odlin	April 5, 1865	
	William Colvard Parker	April 12, 1858	
	Alexander Sinclair Paton	November 20, 1854	
	Charles H. Persons	January 5, 1859	
	William T. Pike	August 23, 1854	
	Thomas F. Porter	October 30, 1847	
	John A. Powers	September 15, 1853	
	John F. Prindle	September 15, 1851	
	Herbert C. Puffer	February 3, 1842	
	James H. Queeney	April 23, 1865	
	William Joseph Quigley		
	Charles H. Ramsdell	September 26, 1840	
	Albert Hoyt Ray	May 24, 1865	
	Silas Dean Reed	June 25, 1872	
	Lewis D. Robinson	June 21, 1842	
	Albert B. Root	June 13, 1858	
	Leonard W. Ross	October 5, 1856	
	Samuel Ross	February 2, 1865	
	Albert Rounseville	May 10, 1871	
	Arthur P. Russell	June 16, 1871	
	William R. Salter	July 6, 1861	
	Edward P. Sands	February 14, 1871	
	Charles R. Saunders	November 22, 1862	
	Louis M. Scates	January 17, 1863	
	William Schofield	February 14, 1857	
	James F. Seavey	December 6, 1842	
	George Shepley Selfridge	September 25, 1868	
	Joseph C. Severance	September 7, 1841	
	Nathan W. Shaw	October 11, 1823	
	Ebenezer Wallen Sheppard	May 7, 1860	
	Arthur A. Simmons	January 28, 1852	
	Robert S. Sisson	June 4, 1846	
	William E. Skillings	October 23, 1843	
	Henry R. Skinner	May 9, 1860	
	Allen F. Smith	September 27, 1862	
	Charles F. A. Smith	July 18, 1866	
	Charles G. Smith	1844	
	John Thomas Sparks	July 9, 1865	
	Wallace Spooner	November 28, 1856	
	Eugene H. Sprague	May 23, 1864	
	Hugh L. Stalker	December 31, 1857	
	Benjamin F. Stanley	November 6, 1823	
	Joseph I. Stewart	April 25, 1847	
	Silas A. Stone	February 3, 1843	
	Willmore B. Stone	June 24, 1853	
	Michael J. Sullivan	October 23, 1870	
	Timothy F. Sullivan	August 21, 1867	
	Charles T. Tatman	December 16, 1871	
	John I. Toland	September 6, 1874	
	William Tolman	June 2, 1858	
	John J. Toomey	September 18, 1868	
	Charles E. Trow	April 18, 1833	
	Henry Edward Turner	May 4, 1842	
	William Turtle	June 20, 1855	
	Horatio Fogg Twombly		
	Edmund J. Twomey	July 16, 1860	
	Charles H. Upson	June 4, 1848	
	George E. Varney	July 8, 1864	
	Silas Ives Wallace		
	Walter S. Watson	September 11, 1851	
	Abelard E. Wells	June 17, 1854	
	Edward E. Wentworth	June 27, 1845	
	Walter S. Weston	November 12, 1852	
	Harry Bertram Whall	September 5, 1868	
	William D. Wheeler	May 7, 1868	
	John B. Whelan	February 19, 1864	
	John Jay Whipple	December 31, 1847	
	Horace C. White	January 26, 1836	
	Edward E. Willard	September 25, 1862	
	George F. Williams	April 28, 1856	
	Alva S. Wood	May 12, 1828	

== See also ==
- 56th United States Congress
- List of Massachusetts General Courts
