= 1902 Massachusetts legislature =

123rd Massachusetts General Court
←	122nd	124th	→

Overview
- Legislative body: General Court
- Election: November 5, 1901

Senate
- Members: 40
- President: Rufus A. Soule
- Party control: Republican (33–7)

House
- Members: 240
- Speaker: James J. Myers
- Party control: Republican (159—70—11)

Sessions
- 1st: January 1, 1902 – June 28, 1902

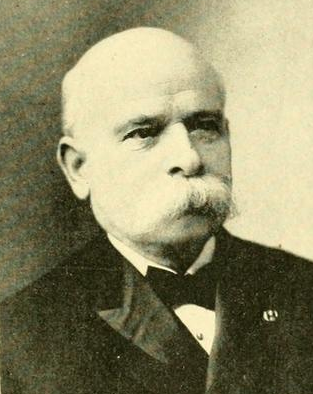
Rufus Soule, Senate president.

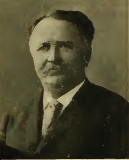
James Myers, House speaker.

Leaders of the Massachusetts General Court, 1902.

The 123rd Massachusetts General Court, consisting of the Massachusetts Senate and the Massachusetts House of Representatives, met in 1902 during the governorship of Winthrop M. Crane. Rufus A. Soule served as president of the Senate and James J. Myers served as speaker of the House.

== Senators ==
image	name	date of birth	district
	Albert S. Apsey	November 27, 1870	
	John K. Berry	November 8, 1854	
	Henry Clay Bliss	May 5, 1846	
	Edward F. Blodgett	August 9, 1848	
	Leonard B. Chandler	August 29, 1851	
	Cornelius R. Day	December 29, 1847	
	George Z. Dean	February 22, 1844	
	Perlie A. Dyar	March 26, 1857	
	Frank A. Fales	October 13, 1848	
	Henry S. Fitzgerald	October 24, 1875	
	W. T. A. Fitzgerald	December 19, 1871	
	Herbert E. Fletcher	May 10, 1862	
	Harry C. Foster	August 27, 1871	
	Archie N. Frost	July 26, 1872	
	Henry E. Gaylord	June 5, 1846	
	Elisha T. Harvell	December 18, 1841	
	Edward C. Holt	January 13, 1850	
	Carleton F. How	April 20, 1863	
	Willard Howland	December 3, 1852	
	George R. Jones	February 8, 1862	
	David Manning	August 29, 1846	
	John F. Marsh	February 1, 1828	
	Andrew H. Morrison	June 27, 1871	
	Merrick A. Morse	May 1, 1847	
	John P. Munroe	June 28, 1850	
	William A. Nye	May 26, 1850	
	J. Frank Porter	April 8, 1847	
	Thomas F. Porter	October 30, 1847	
	David G. Pratt	November 7, 1848	
	Edward Seaver	June 3, 1849	
	Henry R. Skinner	May 9, 1860	
	Rufus Albertson Soule	1839	
	John Thomas Sparks	July 9, 1865	
	Eugene H. Sprague	May 23, 1864	
	Charles S. Sullivan	June 29, 1875	
	John Andrew Sullivan	May 10, 1868	
	Michael J. Sullivan	October 23, 1870	
	George Keyes Tufts	October 17, 1841	
	Chester B. Williams	October 10, 1870	
	Alva S. Wood	May 12, 1828	

== Representatives ==
image	name	date of birth	district
	Charles H. Adams	April 22, 1859	
	Eben Timothy Adams	January 7, 1857	
	Horace C. Adams	July 18, 1848	
	Wilbur F. Adams	March 6, 1865	
	Charles I. Albee	January 17, 1862	
	Henry Morton Aldrich	November 20, 1841	
	William A. Andrews	July 31, 1859	
	Warren P. Babb	November 10, 1850	
	Andrew A. Badaracco	August 28, 1860	
	Frank E. Badger	January 12, 1853	
	A. Dudley Bagley	February 27, 1869	
	William Selby Bamford	August 11, 1864	
	William F. Barrington	April 15, 1877	
	Frank Bartlett	September 5, 1854	
	J. Franklin Batchelder	December 24, 1870	
	Fred Alfred Bearse	February 15, 1871	
	John E. Beck	May 10, 1869	
	Thomas E. Begley	February 23, 1871	
	Albion F. Bemis	July 19, 1856	
	Fred F. Bennett	February 24, 1870	
	Patrick H. Bradley	October 17, 1874	
	Henry Brandes	January 23, 1848	
	Charles P. Brewer	August 1, 1852	
	Elisha Hume Brewster	September 10, 1871	
	William M. Brigham	January 23, 1864	
	Abram English Brown	January 21, 1849	
	George P. Bullard	June 25, 1857	
	George Walton Bullard	May 24, 1841	
	William J. Bullock	January 31, 1864	
	James M. Burke	September 11, 1873	
	Joseph E. Buswell	August 7, 1842	
	Edward B. Callender	February 23, 1851	
	James F. Carey	August 19, 1867	
	Frank M. Chace	April 16, 1856	
	Edwards Cheney	May 3, 1861	
	Luther W. Clark	September 19, 1851	
	A. Chalkley Collins	March 27, 1857	
	Benjamin G. Collins	December 25, 1860	
	John J. Collins	August 27, 1865	
	Thomas J. Collins	October 28, 1868	
	John A. Coulthurst	June 24, 1871	
	William F. Craig	September 15, 1866	
	Arthur G. Crane	July 18, 1871	
	Frank G. Creamer	July 20, 1861	
	David W. Creed	November 5, 1867	
	Thomas Laurie Creeley	May 23, 1849	
	J. Howell Crosby	December 30, 1867	
	Joseph H. Cummings	June 16, 1840	
	John J. Cunningham	May 7, 1873	
	James Michael Curley	November 20, 1874	
	Henry Morse Cutler	July 19, 1865	
	William F. Dana	June 26, 1863	
	Alphonso Davis	September 4, 1863	
	Daniel W. Davis	October 3, 1846	
	Thomas L. Davis	March 15, 1852	
	Benjamin C. Dean	March 8, 1843	
	Charles Austin Dean	March 26, 1856	
	F. Dorr Deming	August 1, 1833	
	Jeremiah J. Desmond	November 3, 1867	
	George H. Dinan	May 18, 1871	
	Wooster F. Dodge	March 28, 1841	
	Thomas Donahue	August 20, 1853	
	Jeremiah F. Donovan	May 10, 1856	
	James J. Dowd	March 7, 1858	
	Aaron Coolidge Dowse	March 27, 1856	
	Charles M. Draper	November 1, 1869	
	Horace Rogers Drinkwater	May 28, 1872	
	John Duff	August 30, 1870	
	Edward Quincy Dyer	October 4, 1841	
	Karl M. Ebert	July 26, 1867	
	Fred Albert Emery	November 22, 1869	
	James R. Entwistle	June 5, 1845	
	Edward A. Estabrook	December 21, 1842	
	Noble W. Everett	February 20, 1827	
	George H. Fall	October 19, 1858	
	William Newhall Felton	December 25, 1835	
	Frank W. Fenno	October 24, 1861	
	Henry M. Fern	December 23, 1862	
	John Eben Fisher	May 30, 1861	
	Richard H. Foley	June 16, 1867	
	John F. Foster	October 22, 1862	
	Louis A. Frothingham	July 13, 1871	
	Fred Eugene Fuller	September 10, 1862	
	Arthur H. Gardner	August 4, 1854	
	Charles N. Gardner	March 29, 1845	
	George H. Garfield	July 18, 1858	
	John J. Gartland	November 27, 1871	
	Frank Gerrett	February 4, 1857	
	George H. Gibney	October 24, 1858	
	Fred C. Gilpatric	August 22, 1865	
	David J. Gleason	July 14, 1864	
	C. Burr Goodrich	January 13, 1875	
	Eben H. Googins	July 28, 1845	
	Charles H. Goulding	March 24, 1838	
	Charles H. Green	January 11, 1842	
	Henry G. Greene	October 26, 1843	
	John G. Hagberg	August 24, 1873	
	George A. Hall	November 28, 1848	
	Portus B. Hancock	February 19, 1836	
	Edwin A. Harney	February 22, 1862	
	Ulysses G. Haskell	October 3, 1863	
	Elbridge Gerry Hastings	July 21, 1840	
	Arthur W. Hatch	December 26, 1865	
	William Henry Hayes	November 26, 1866	
	William Henry Irving Hayes	June 21, 1848	
	Frank M. Heath	September 8, 1852	
	Joseph F. Hickey	January 20, 1875	
	Albert S. N. Hickford	January 24, 1859	
	Martin P. Higgins	October 16, 1857	
	Sidney Adelvin Hill	August 26, 1849	
	Alexander Holmes	July 28, 1867	
	Robert Homans	October 3, 1873	
	Timothy Howard	October 19, 1863	
	George C. Hunt	April 7, 1859	
	Harry Draper Hunt	December 27, 1874	
	Harrie C. Hunter	March 16, 1869	
	John C. Hurley	December 19, 1875	
	George H. Jackson	March 9, 1865	
	Joseph G. Jackson	February 13, 1860	
	Warren Carlton Jewett	January 28, 1855	
	Thomas F. Keenan	March 11, 1854	
	Edward H. Keith	October 23, 1859	
	Thomas A. Kelley	May 10, 1875	
	Daniel J. Kiley	July 27, 1874	
	Moody Kimball	July 2, 1862	
	Homer R. King	June 4, 1846	
	Alfred Franklin Kinney	October 25, 1851	
	Dwight Freeman Lane	September 4, 1862	
	Thomas P. Larkin	February 6, 1862	
	Joseph S. Leach	November 14, 1860	
	David Dennis Leahy	April 15, 1876	
	James Patrick Lennon	August 28, 1863	
	George F. Leslie	September 12, 1850	
	William Henry Lewis	November 28, 1868	
	William W. Linnehan	August 6, 1861	
	William H. Litchfield	August 18, 1855	
	Albert Littlefield	May 8, 1856	
	Edward L. Logan	January 20, 1875	
	Robert Luce	December 2, 1862	
	Frederic O. MacCartney	November 2, 1864	
	Thomas Mackey	August 6, 1865	
	Michael J. Mahoney	December 25, 1861	
	John T. Maloney	July 14, 1853	
	John J. Mansfield	October 10, 1869	
	Eugene Dennis Marchesseault	September 29, 1865	
	J. Manuel Marshall	June 1, 1869	
	George Washington Maxon	August 3, 1862	
	James H. McInerney	December 13, 1871	
	John McKnight	March 5, 1872	
	Edward L. McMahon	October 24, 1869	
	William S. McNary	March 29, 1863	
	James J. Mellen	March 30, 1875	
	Walter Brown Mellen	September 24, 1860	
	John E. Merritt	February 21, 1849	
	Edwin J. Mills	May 1, 1861	
	Bernard Francis Mitchell	March 30, 1867	
	James A. Montgomery	May 17, 1864	
	J. Myron Moore	November 3, 1866	
	Lucien O. Moore	December 23, 1849	
	Harold P. Moseley	November 13, 1871	
	James J. Myers	November 20, 1842	
	Arthur E. Newcomb	January 31, 1872	
	Richard Newell	April 17, 1839	
	Francis S. Newhall	December 4, 1860	
	Francis Dexter Newton	August 31, 1848	
	H. Huestis Newton	December 2, 1860	
	Walter E. Nichols	July 16, 1870	
	John Nightingale	September 6, 1838	
	Daniel J. O'Brien	October 5, 1873	
	John E. O'Neill	January 15, 1862	
	Edward L. Osgood	August 6, 1844	
	Henry K. Palmer	March 3, 1869	
	Fordis C. Parker	January 3, 1868	
	James Pearce	May 7, 1843	
	Pierre F. Peloquin	May 26, 1851	
	Andrew James Peters	April 3, 1872	
	William B. Phinney	November 29, 1857	
	Joseph F. Pitman	May 28, 1848	
	Charles H. Pratt	November 11, 1848	
	Charles H. Preston	March 22, 1863	
	John H. Quinlan	February 29, 1864	
	John Quinn, Jr.	December 16, 1859	
	Thomas E. Raftery	July 10, 1869	
	Joseph C. Randlett	May 22, 1859	
	John Laughlin Rankin	December 6, 1850	
	Benjamin Calvin Reed	December 24, 1849	
	Silas Dean Reed	June 25, 1872	
	Charles H. Reinhart	March 8, 1867	
	Samuel Roads, Jr.	October 22, 1853	
	Webster Cushing Robbins	January 28, 1860	
	Arthur E. Roberts	June 22, 1861	
	Robert Rogerson	October 11, 1869	
	Samuel Ross	February 2, 1865	
	Thomas Bradford Rounds	April 2, 1853	
	William J. Rounds	June 24, 1855	
	Arthur P. Russell	June 16, 1871	
	Simon B. Ryan	October 8, 1874	
	Henry F. Sampson	May 12, 1835	
	George A. Schofield	April 26, 1863	
	William Schofield	February 14, 1857	
	Winfield S. Schuster	December 29, 1855	
	Daniel J. Sheehan	August 11, 1857	
	Edmund C. Shepardson	December 2, 1848	
	James Clifford Sherman	May 23, 1874	
	Mark N. Skerrett	February 23, 1870	
	Arthur P. Sleeper	September 21, 1875	
	George T. Sleeper	September 15, 1852	
	Caleb L. Smith	June 23, 1849	
	Fred M. Smith	September 19, 1862	
	Henry Ellsworth Stanton	January 23, 1846	
	Charles Ephraim Stearns	April 27, 1868	
	Frank K. Stearns	November 26, 1854	
	Isaac M. Story	April 28, 1855	
	Peter F. Sullivan	June 29, 1871	
	William J. Sullivan	April 14, 1865	
	Thomas Sutton	April 2, 1850	
	Charles W. Swift	December 26, 1866	
	Arthur M. Taft	January 28, 1854	
	George W. Tapley	September 1, 1835	
	Francis Xavier Tetrault	November 5, 1845	
	James N. Thompson	March 3, 1839	
	Charles Harrison Tucker	May 19, 1867	
	Maurice Endicott Tyler	January 27, 1843	
	Samuel Willard Tyler	February 11, 1866	
	Charles L. Underhill	July 20, 1867	
	Thomas Melville Vinson	April 27, 1868	
	Charles E. Ward	October 17, 1849	
	Louis H. Warner	January 8, 1875	
	Handel E. Washburn	August 25, 1859	
	Moses C. Waterhouse	April 29, 1855	
	David P. Waters	March 16, 1838	
	Joseph Warren Wattles	August 7, 1862	
	Horace I. Whipple	March 30, 1859	
	Charles F. Wildes	October 17, 1848	
	J. William Williams	June 11, 1849	
	Lombard Williams	November 7, 1874	
	Thomas W. Williams	September 15, 1865	
	Gordon Willis	January 13, 1851	
	James Irish Wingate	June 4, 1837	
	John Young, Jr.	February 6, 1871	

== See also ==
- 57th United States Congress
- List of Massachusetts General Courts
