= 1898 Massachusetts legislature =

119th Massachusetts General Court
←	118th	120th	→

Overview
- Legislative body: General Court
- Election: November 2, 1897

Senate
- Members: 40
- President: George Edwin Smith
- Party control: Republican (33–7)

House
- Members: 240
- Speaker: John L. Bates
- Party control: Republican (181–57)

Sessions
- 1st: January 5, 1898 – June 23, 1898

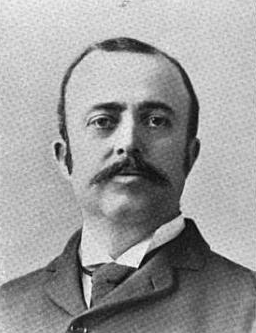
George Smith, Senate president.

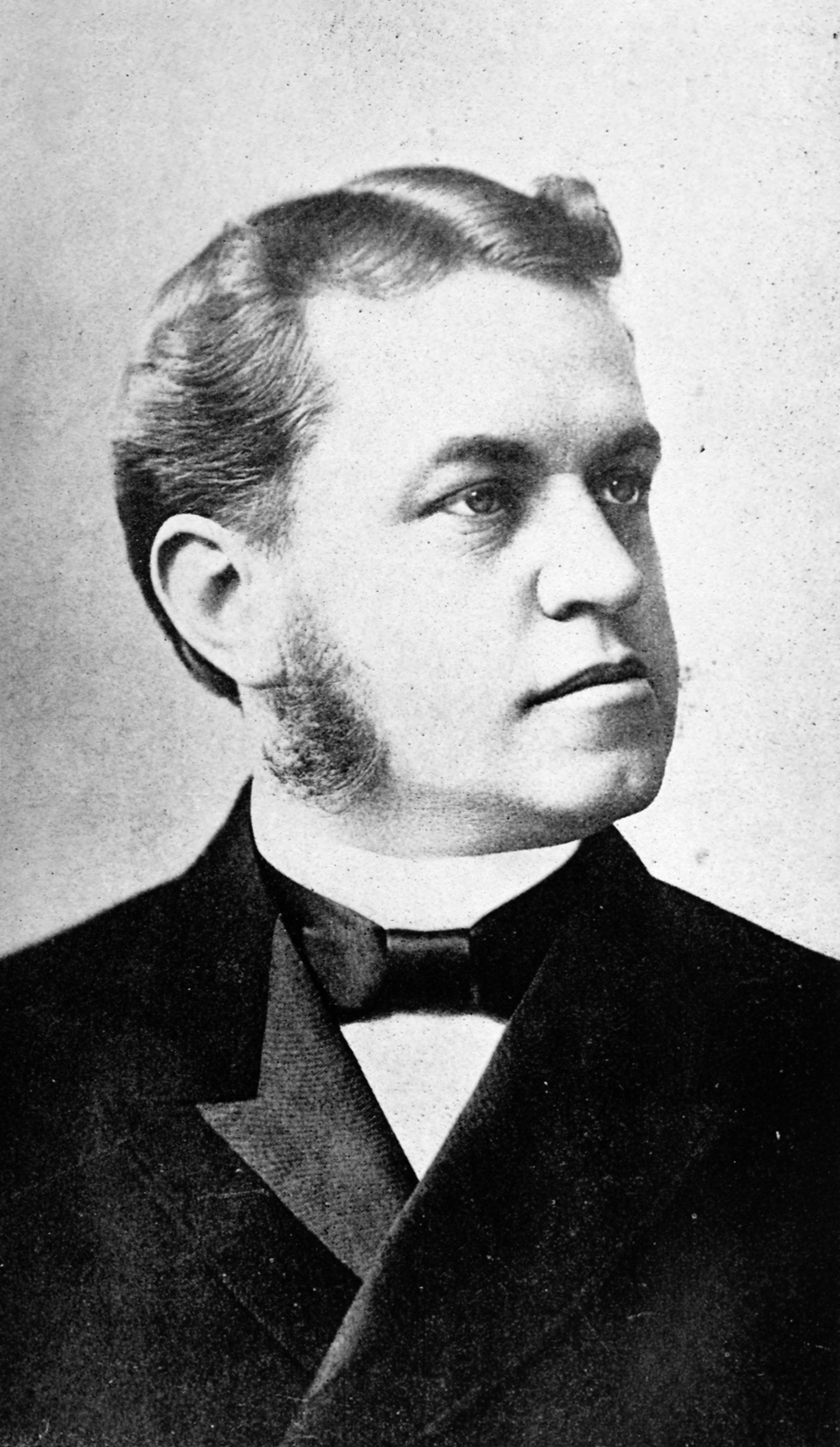
John Bates, House speaker.

Leaders of the Massachusetts General Court, 1898.

The 119th Massachusetts General Court, consisting of the Massachusetts Senate and the Massachusetts House of Representatives, met in 1898 during the governorship of Roger Wolcott. George Edwin Smith served as president of the Senate and John L. Bates served as speaker of the House.

== Senators ==
Image	Name	Date of Birth	District
	Charles O. Bailey	January 24, 1863	
	Harding R. Barber	December 20, 1839	
	Josiah C. Bennett	May 6, 1835	
	William R. Black	August 23, 1830	
	Walter L. Bouve	October 28, 1849	
	William Hartwell Brigham	February 1, 1863	
	Loyed E. Chamberlain	January 30, 1857	
	William H. Cook	January 7, 1843	
	Ellery B. Crane	November 12, 1836	
	Frederick W. Dallinger	October 2, 1871	
	William W. Davis	August 8, 1862	
	Wilson H. Fairbank	April 3, 1836	
	Joseph Byron Farley	October 10, 1847	
	James H. Flint	June 25, 1852	
	Joseph J. Flynn	May 1, 1862	
	Charles E. Folsom	February 24, 1855	
	James A. Gallivan	October 22, 1866	
	John Dennis Hammond Gauss	January 4, 1861	
	Samuel Wesley George	April 26, 1862	
	Albert L. Harwood	September 10, 1847	
	James E. Hayes	August 10, 1865	
	William H. Hodgkins	June 9, 1840	
	Joshua B. Holden	March 5, 1850	
	Richard William Irwin	February 18, 1857	
	William W. Leach	February 22, 1856	
	William B. Mahoney	December 5, 1857	
	William Moran	September 6, 1855	
	William A. Morse	July 27, 1863	
	Henry Parsons	February 2, 1842	
	George E. Putnam	February 9, 1851	
	Charles I. Quirk	August 15, 1871	
	Ernest W. Roberts	November 22, 1858	
	Alfred Seelye Roe	June 8, 1844	
	Daniel D. Rourke	July 16, 1869	
	George Edwin Smith	April 5, 1849	
	Rufus Albertson Soule	1839	
	William W. Towle	August 21, 1860	
	William A. Whittlesey	February 21, 1849	
	Fred Homer Williams	January 7, 1857	
	Charles F. Woodward	November 19, 1852	

== Representatives ==
image	name	date of birth	district
	Austin Flint Adams	July 15, 1840	
	Rollin M. Allen	April 10, 1862	
	Romeo E. Allen	October 17, 1852	
	S. Augustus Allen	February 14, 1855	
	Butler Ames	August 22, 1871	
	Richard F. Andrews, Jr	April 13, 1863	
	Julius C. Anthony	September 24, 1856	
	Albert S. Apsey	November 27, 1870	
	Henry C. Attwill	March 11, 1872	
	Thomas C. Bachelder	November 6, 1860	
	George Balcom	January 23, 1832	
	John E. Baldwin	June 26, 1869	
	Frank W. Barnard	January 3, 1853	
	George H. Bartlett	September 6, 1857	
	Jonathan B. L. Bartlett	October 11, 1849	
	John L. Bates	September 18, 1859	
	David W. Battles	January 20, 1854	
	Charles O. Beede	December 29, 1840	
	Henry A. Belcher	August 6, 1845	
	George E. Bemis	October 23, 1855	
	Frank P. Bennett	May 2, 1853	
	Scott F. Bickford	November 14, 1864	
	Horatio Bisbee	November 20, 1833	
	Osgood C. Blaney	January 20, 1860	
	John Bleiler	May 9, 1837	
	Henry H. Bosworth	March 16, 1868	
	Jerome Bottomly	August 14, 1842	
	Harvey L. Boutwell	April 5, 1860	
	Warren Boynton	July 17, 1836	
	Melvin L. Breath	December 7, 1858	
	Hugh W. Bresnahan	November 25, 1869	
	William Bridgeo	October 14, 1849	
	Oscar T. Brooks	June 6, 1839	
	Charles E. Brown	November 18, 1850	
	William J. Bullock	January 31, 1864	
	Albert H. Burgess	May 19, 1843	
	Edward B. Callender	February 23, 1851	
	Andrew Campbell	May 3, 1826	
	James F. Carberry	September 18, 1868	
	George Henry Carleton	August 6, 1840	
	Leonard B. Chandler	August 29, 1851	
	William D. Chapple	August 6, 1868	
	James B. Clancy	May 26, 1868	
	Albert Clarke	October 13, 1840	
	Charles S. Clerke	January 10, 1850	
	James M. Codman, Jr.	April 20, 1862	
	Samuel Cole	December 15, 1856	
	John W. Connelly	July 16, 1874	
	Thomas A. Conroy	September 9, 1869	
	Walter S. V. Cooke	August 12, 1851	
	Daniel S. Coolidge	September 21, 1845	
	George W. Coombs	November 4, 1837	
	Fred E. Crawford	July 7, 1857	
	Thomas W. Crocker	December 27, 1832	
	Alfred R. Crosby	August 30, 1838	
	Henry V. Crosby	February 27, 1832	
	Charles S. Crouch	1833	
	Richard Cullinane	February 2, 1859	
	William Curtis	August 8, 1857	
	J. Frank Dalton	April 19, 1842	
	Daniel W. Davis	October 3, 1846	
	William Ripley Davis	March 8, 1862	
	Charles Austin Dean	March 26, 1856	
	Charles Leroy Dean	May 29, 1844	
	Thomas M. Denham	February 2, 1840	
	Thomas Donahue	August 20, 1853	
	Eugene E. Donovan	November 21, 1858	
	Thomas J. Dooling	January 28, 1868	
	Frederic P. Drake	March 16, 1851	
	Henry J. Draper	March 4, 1859	
	Daniel J. Driscoll, 2d	November 20, 1868	
	Hugo A. Dubuque	November 3, 1854	
	John B. Dumond	December 25, 1862	
	Daniel England	July 1, 1868	
	Eugene B. Estes	December 7, 1850	
	Frank W. Estey	December 16, 1866	
	Frank H. Farmer	October 13, 1857	
	Francis F. Farrar	January 10, 1833	
	John Favor	March 1, 1859	
	Asa B. Fay	August 31, 1838	
	John J. Feneno	March 24, 1866	
	W. T. A. Fitzgerald	December 19, 1871	
	Albert T. Folsom	November 9, 1831	
	Harry C. Foster	August 27, 1871	
	Frank W. Francis	September 16, 1857	
	George G. Frederick	January 14, 1867	
	George F. Fuller	March 8, 1842	
	Michael E. Gaddis	February 21, 1869	
	Richard W. Garrity	March 14, 1864	
	John J. Gartland	November 27, 1871	
	Henry E. Gaylord	June 5, 1846	
	Moses D. Gilman	May 23, 1846	
	David J. Gleason	July 14, 1864	
	Otis M. Gove	May 3, 1851	
	Oliver S. Grant	April 30, 1866	
	James Wilson Grimes	November 21, 1865	
	Almon E. Hall	December 6, 1846	
	Amos E. Hall	July 6, 1838	
	Luther Hall	November 5, 1842	
	Frederick Hammond	February 27, 1847	
	Franklin P. Harlow		
	George F. Harwood	July 7, 1844	
	Leander Miller Haskins	June 20, 1842	
	Martin E. Hawes	October 25, 1834	
	Alfred S. Hayes	May 14, 1869	
	William Henry Irving Hayes	June 21, 1848	
	Albert F. Hayward	January 24, 1840	
	Ashton E. Hemphill	September 17, 1849	
	John W. Hill	July 1, 1846	
	Albert F. Hiscox	May 9, 1852	
	Charles E. Hoag	September 18, 1849	
	Seba A. Holton	August 30, 1847	
	Francis J. Horgan	July 2, 1869	
	Carleton F. How	April 20, 1863	
	Walter F. Howard	September 20, 1855	
	Rufus Howe	September 28, 1837	
	Edward H. Hoyt	July 11, 1849	
	Franklin E. Huntress	April 19, 1866	
	Charles Hiller Innes	August 6, 1870	
	Charles R. Johnson	December 28, 1852	
	George R. Jones	February 8, 1862	
	Melville D. Jones	September 25, 1842	
	Michael Bernard Jones	August 20, 1864	
	William A. Josselyn	February 8, 1856	
	Joseph H. Joubert	April 6, 1860	
	Daniel Joseph Kane	April 14, 1872	
	Charles P. Keith	March 14, 1843	
	William Kells, Jr.	October 23, 1861	
	John L. Kelly	March 29, 1869	
	Thomas W. Kenefick	September 17, 1855	
	Daniel J. Kiley	July 27, 1874	
	Arthur D. King	May 13, 1843	
	Randolph V. King	January 20, 1853	
	William S. Kyle	July 12, 1851	
	William A. Lang	May 26, 1836	
	Addison P. Learoyd	February 11, 1838	
	Francis Leland	October 3, 1839	
	Charles Dudley Lewis	September 26, 1844	
	John F. Libby	February 3, 1863	
	Alexander Lockhart	December 22, 1854	
	Albert W. Lyon	March 1, 1869	
	Luke J. Macken	October 27, 1868	
	Thomas Mackey	August 6, 1865	
	John E. Magenis	May 5, 1873	
	David A. Mahoney	December 21, 1867	
	William E. Mahoney	May 15, 1872	
	William H. Marden	May 30, 1843	
	Benjamin W. Mayo	April 17, 1836	
	Jeremiah Justin McCarthy	March 29, 1852	
	Levi G. McKnight	April 30, 1843	
	William I. McLoughlin	January 16, 1872	
	John A. McManus	March 9, 1860	
	George F. Mead	May 22, 1854	
	Thomas H. Meek	January 30, 1840	
	George W. Mellen	May 11, 1837	
	William J. Miller	June 8, 1867	
	Charles P. Mills	August 22, 1853	
	James A. Montgomery	May 17, 1864	
	Andrew H. Morrison	June 27, 1871	
	William L. Morse	May 1, 1849	
	James J. Myers	November 20, 1842	
	William A. Nettleton	1832	
	Edward B. Nevin	November 10, 1858	
	Thaddeus H. Newcomb	March 15, 1826	
	William N. Newcomb	July 23, 1865	
	H. Huestis Newton	December 2, 1860	
	T. Frank Noonan	June 1, 1860	
	George H. Norton	May 28, 1863	
	James O'Connor	June 15, 1862	
	Charles E. Parker	October 20, 1833	
	Harold Parker	June 17, 1854	
	Herbert C. Parsons	January 15, 1862	
	Alexander Sinclair Paton	November 20, 1854	
	Joseph E. Pattee	April 24, 1843	
	Francis C. Perry	June 27, 1853	
	Lemuel W. Peters	July 29, 1860	
	Joseph M. Philbrick	November 20, 1869	
	Franklin F. Phillips	December 21, 1852	
	Edward L. Pickard	December 25, 1834	
	John H. Ponce	November 1, 1857	
	Albert Poor	November 21, 1853	
	Burrill Porter	February 22, 1832	
	John A. Powers	September 15, 1853	
	David G. Pratt	November 7, 1848	
	James P. Ramsay	April 30, 1861	
	Charles H. Ramsdell	September 26, 1840	
	Silas Dean Reed	June 25, 1872	
	George M. Rice	October 20, 1843	
	Frank S. Richardson	October 18, 1856	
	Leonard W. Ross	October 5, 1856	
	Samuel Ross	February 2, 1865	
	John A. Rowan	November 9, 1872	
	Edward T. Rowell	1836	
	Michael L. Russell	December 15, 1860	
	Charles R. Saunders	November 22, 1862	
	Thomas D. Sears	February 22, 1845	
	James F. Seavey	December 6, 1842	
	George Shepley Selfridge	September 25, 1868	
	William H. Severance	January 12, 1857	
	John F. Sheehan	September 2, 1861	
	Robert S. Sisson	June 4, 1846	
	William E. Skillings	October 23, 1843	
	John O. Slocum	March 13, 1842	
	George B. Smart	February 25, 1835	
	Harvey C. Smith	November 20, 1847	
	Andrew R. Snow	May 4, 1844	
	Hugh L. Stalker	December 31, 1857	
	Benjamin F. Stanley	November 6, 1823	
	Nathaniel G. Staples	June 1, 1851	
	Marcus M. Stebbins	December 29, 1840	
	John M. Stevenson	August 31, 1846	
	Joseph I. Stewart	April 25, 1847	
	Willmore B. Stone	June 24, 1853	
	Cornelius F. Sullivan	June 15, 1865	
	Arthur R. Taft	February 19, 1859	
	Peter Francis Tague	June 4, 1871	
	Zephaniah Talbot	June 22, 1834	
	James Thompson	May 18, 1848	
	Charles W. Tilton	April 6, 1836	
	Charles E. Trow	April 18, 1833	
	Samuel A. Tuttle	September 11, 1837	
	Edmund J. Twomey	July 16, 1860	
	J. Gilman Waite	March 20, 1837	
	Charles G. Washburn	January 28, 1857	
	Eben C. Waterman	March 1, 1840	
	Abelard E. Wells	June 17, 1854	
	Edward E. Wentworth	June 27, 1845	
	George W. Whidden	June 15, 1858	
	John Jay Whipple	December 31, 1847	
	Elbridge J. Whitaker	November 11, 1859	
	Frank H. Whitcomb	January 7, 1838	
	George L. Whitcomb	March 18, 1855	
	Horace C. White	January 26, 1836	
	James Whitehead	December 20, 1857	
	Edward E. Willard	September 25, 1862	
	Appleton P. Williams	January 28, 1867	
	George F. Williams	April 28, 1856	
	Francis O. Winslow	March 20, 1844	
	Alva S. Wood	May 12, 1828	

== See also ==
- 55th United States Congress
- List of Massachusetts General Courts
