= 1903 Massachusetts legislature =

124th Massachusetts General Court
←	123rd	125th	→

Overview
- Legislative body: General Court
- Election: November 4, 1902

Senate
- Members: 40
- President: George R. Jones
- Party control: Republican (31–9)

House
- Members: 240
- Speaker: James J. Myers
- Party control: Republican (154–83–3)

Sessions
- 1st: January 7, 1903 – June 26, 1903

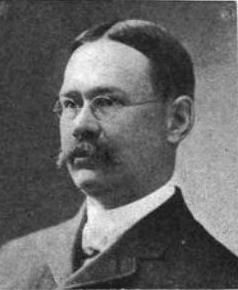
George Jones, Senate president.

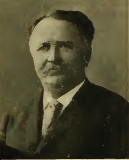
James Myers, House speaker.

Leaders of the Massachusetts General Court, 1903.

The 124th Massachusetts General Court, consisting of the Massachusetts Senate and the Massachusetts House of Representatives, met in 1903 during the governorship of John L. Bates. George R. Jones served as president of the Senate and James J. Myers served as speaker of the House.

== Senators ==
image	name	date of birth	district
	Francis H. Appleton	June 17, 1847	
	Albert S. Apsey	November 27, 1870	
	A. Dudley Bagley	February 27, 1869	
	Albion F. Bemis	July 19, 1856	
	Albert A. Brackett	December 5, 1850	
	Leonard B. Chandler	August 29, 1851	
	Charles S. Clerke	January 10, 1850	
	Samuel Cole	December 15, 1856	
	Thomas J. Dillon	April 20, 1869	
	Perlie A. Dyar	March 26, 1857	
	Henry S. Fitzgerald	October 24, 1875	
	W. T. A. Fitzgerald	December 19, 1871	
	Herbert E. Fletcher	May 10, 1862	
	Harry C. Foster	August 27, 1871	
	Archie N. Frost	July 26, 1872	
	Henry E. Gaylord	June 5, 1846	
	George N. Goff	July 24, 1837	
	Frederick S. Gore	April 15, 1862	
	Otis M. Gove	May 3, 1851	
	Arthur Harrington	July 23, 1874	
	Elisha T. Harvell	December 18, 1841	
	Frank M. Heath	September 8, 1852	
	Carleton F. How	April 20, 1863	
	George R. Jones	February 8, 1862	
	William H. MacInnis	November 22, 1861	
	James H. McKinley	May 21, 1860	
	John P. Munroe	June 28, 1850	
	Herbert Newell	April 2, 1855	
	Benjamin F. Nickerson	June 23, 1842	
	William A. Nye	May 26, 1850	
	Edward L. Osgood	August 6, 1844	
	Thomas F. Porter	October 30, 1847	
	David G. Pratt	November 7, 1848	
	Henry F. Sampson	May 12, 1835	
	Edward Seaver	June 3, 1849	
	Henry R. Skinner	May 9, 1860	
	Rufus Albertson Soule	1839	
	Michael J. Sullivan	October 23, 1870	
	George Keyes Tufts	October 17, 1841	
	George R. Wallace	June 20, 1859	

== Representatives ==
image	name	date of birth	district
	Chester H. Abbe	April 5, 1860	
	Henry Morton Aldrich	November 20, 1841	
	James Sidney Allen	July 3, 1831	
	William A. Andrews	July 31, 1859	
	James F. Aylward	August 4, 1862	
	Andrew A. Badaracco	August 28, 1860	
	William Selby Bamford	August 11, 1864	
	James Barr	September 20, 1854	
	William F. Barrington	April 15, 1877	
	J. Franklin Batchelder	December 24, 1870	
	Francis Batcheller	June 3, 1858	
	George H. Battis	1863	
	Fred Alfred Bearse	February 15, 1871	
	John E. Beck	May 10, 1869	
	Thomas E. Begley	February 23, 1871	
	Frank P. Bennett	May 2, 1853	
	Fred F. Bennett	February 24, 1870	
	John Williston Blaney	September 18, 1841	
	Ernest Linwood Bonney	June 23, 1864	
	Henry A. Booth	October 30, 1866	
	Manassah Edward Bradley	August 15, 1863	
	Lewis S. Breed	November 4, 1866	
	Charles P. Brewer	August 1, 1852	
	Elisha Hume Brewster	September 10, 1871	
	William M. Brigham	January 23, 1864	
	William R. Brooks	March 1, 1865	
	William W. Brooks	June 27, 1829	
	Abram English Brown	January 21, 1849	
	Franklin Brown	November 11, 1837	
	William Harrison Brown	February 16, 1852	
	William J. Bullock	January 31, 1864	
	William A. Burns	January 9, 1875	
	Thomas H. Buttimer	March 17, 1868	
	Edward B. Callender	February 23, 1851	
	James F. Carey	August 19, 1867	
	Edwin J. Castle	April 15, 1853	
	Frank M. Chace	April 16, 1856	
	Charles Albert Claflin	December 8, 1843	
	James Colby Dorr Clark	June 10, 1872	
	Luther W. Clark	September 19, 1851	
	Samuel F. Coffin	December 27, 1851	
	John N. Cole	November 4, 1863	
	Michael James Collins	July 8, 1852	
	Edmund C. Cottle	October 1, 1842	
	John A. Coulthurst	June 24, 1871	
	Guy W. Cox	January 19, 1871	
	William F. Craig	September 15, 1866	
	David W. Creed	November 5, 1867	
	James Crichton	October 31, 1846	
	John J. Cunningham	May 7, 1873	
	James Michael Curley	November 20, 1874	
	Michael F. Curran	November 30, 1875	
	William F. Dana	June 26, 1863	
	Daniel W. Davis	October 3, 1846	
	Thomas L. Davis	March 15, 1852	
	William J. Davison	March 20, 1873	
	Benjamin C. Dean	March 8, 1843	
	Charles Austin Dean	March 26, 1856	
	Frederick Simpson Deitrick	April 9, 1875	
	Daniel J. Dempsey	June 8, 1866	
	Wooster F. Dodge	March 28, 1841	
	Thomas Donahue	August 20, 1853	
	Daniel J. Donnelly	October 13, 1868	
	Jeremiah F. Donovan	May 10, 1856	
	George H. Doty	May 9, 1861	
	Thomas E. Dougherty	June 4, 1848	
	James J. Dowd	March 7, 1858	
	Aaron Coolidge Dowse	March 27, 1856	
	Horace Rogers Drinkwater	May 28, 1872	
	John Duff	August 30, 1870	
	Edward Quincy Dyer	October 4, 1841	
	Fred Albert Emery	November 22, 1869	
	James R. Entwistle	June 5, 1845	
	Noble W. Everett	February 20, 1827	
	William A. Fahey	July 26, 1875	
	Lowell Ethan Fales	September 28, 1858	
	Peter T. Fallon	July 16, 1856	
	Frank W. Fenno	October 24, 1861	
	Ernest C. Field	February 6, 1852	
	Dennis H. Finn	April 2, 1870	
	Michael FitzGerald	September 29, 1869	
	Richard Rich Freeman	November 19, 1860	
	Fred M. French	November 5, 1861	
	Louis A. Frothingham	July 13, 1871	
	Arthur H. Gardner	August 4, 1854	
	John D. Gardner	April 19, 1860	
	George H. Garfield	July 18, 1858	
	Guy W. Garland	December 11, 1844	
	Julius Garst	December 12, 1855	
	John J. Gartland	November 27, 1871	
	Arthur L. Gavin	June 11, 1876	
	Frank E. Gaylord	May 1, 1868	
	Frank Gerrett	February 4, 1857	
	Charles Giddings	May 10, 1867	
	Arthur B. Gillpatrick	March 28, 1861	
	Jeremiah J. Good	May 6, 1865	
	C. Burr Goodrich	January 13, 1875	
	Eben H. Googins	July 28, 1845	
	William H. Gove	September 4, 1851	
	Thomas J. Grady	December 16, 1877	
	Alfred Sigourney Hall	August 27, 1861	
	Guy Andrews Ham	July 8, 1878	
	William E. Hannan	October 26, 1873	
	Heman A. Harding	February 6, 1871	
	Edwin A. Harney	February 22, 1862	
	Michael F. Hart	September 22, 1873	
	Arthur W. Hatch	December 26, 1865	
	James Austin Hawkes	July 3, 1848	
	William Henry Hayes	November 26, 1866	
	William Henry Irving Hayes	June 21, 1848	
	William C. S. Healey	September 26, 1873	
	Thomas F. Hederman	March 4, 1873	
	Sidney Adelvin Hill	August 26, 1849	
	Herbert N. Hinckley	December 31, 1864	
	Robert Homans	October 3, 1873	
	Adin Baker Horton	November 7, 1855	
	Isaiah H. Horton	November 14, 1835	
	Frank H. Howe	January 22, 1861	
	Augustus Hubbard	June 27, 1849	
	George C. Hunt	April 7, 1859	
	George H. Jackson	March 9, 1865	
	Joseph G. Jackson	February 13, 1860	
	William B. Jackson	February 4, 1866	
	Warren Carlton Jewett	January 28, 1855	
	John M. Johnson	March 15, 1868	
	Thomas A. Kelley	May 10, 1875	
	William A. Kelley	April 27, 1868	
	Thomas J. Kennedy	May 20, 1857	
	Daniel J. Kiley	July 27, 1874	
	Moody Kimball	July 2, 1862	
	Frederick W. Klemm	March 7, 1847	
	Frank J. Knight	September 29, 1856	
	George Sumner Ladd	March 20, 1857	
	Dwight Freeman Lane	September 4, 1862	
	James M. Lane	December 1, 1872	
	Thomas P. Larkin	February 6, 1862	
	David Dennis Leahy	April 15, 1876	
	Henry F. Lehan	September 16, 1874	
	James Patrick Lennon	August 28, 1863	
	Frank J. Linehan	January 31, 1870	
	Robert Luce	December 2, 1862	
	Frederic O. MacCartney	November 2, 1864	
	Michael J. Mahoney	December 25, 1861	
	John M. Maloney	December 2, 1870	
	James A. McDonald, Jr.	May 19, 1871	
	James H. McInerney	December 13, 1871	
	Edward L. McMahon	October 24, 1869	
	Henry Austin McMaster	June 24, 1844	
	James J. Mellen	March 30, 1875	
	Edwin J. Mills	May 1, 1861	
	Bernard Francis Mitchell	March 30, 1867	
	John Joseph Mitchell	May 9, 1873	
	Harold P. Moseley	November 13, 1871	
	James J. Myers	November 20, 1842	
	John S. Nason	May 6, 1860	
	Francis S. Newhall	December 4, 1860	
	H. Huestis Newton	December 2, 1860	
	Gilbert M. Nichols	December 20, 1856	
	Walter E. Nichols	July 16, 1870	
	John Nightingale	September 6, 1838	
	Charles Henry Nowell	October 15, 1843	
	Daniel J. O'Brien	October 5, 1873	
	J. Frank O'Hare	October 14, 1874	
	John E. O'Neill	January 15, 1862	
	Hugh O'Rourke	March 1, 1869	
	Andrew L. O'Toole	March 25, 1878	
	Richard Olney II	January 5, 1871	
	James Breckenridge Paige	December 28, 1861	
	Fordis C. Parker	January 3, 1868	
	Thomas Pattison	January 20, 1854	
	Pierre F. Peloquin	May 26, 1851	
	Charles N. Perley	February 26, 1851	
	Winthrop Edmund Perry	November 6, 1842	
	William B. Phinney	November 29, 1857	
	Mellen A. Pingree	March 9, 1861	
	Joseph F. Pitman	May 28, 1848	
	William Henry Poole	October 22, 1857	
	Elmer C. Potter	August 23, 1868	
	Maurice J. Power	July 21, 1872	
	John H. Quinlan	February 29, 1864	
	John Quinn, Jr.	December 16, 1859	
	Thomas E. Raftery	July 10, 1869	
	John Laughlin Rankin	December 6, 1850	
	Wallace C. Ransden	November 1, 1853	
	Benjamin Calvin Reed	December 24, 1849	
	Charles H. Reinhart	March 8, 1867	
	Royal S. Ripley	April 29, 1840	
	Frank Robinson	December 5, 1858	
	John G. Robinson	November 24, 1860	
	Robert Rogerson	October 11, 1869	
	Samuel Ross	February 2, 1865	
	Thomas Bradford Rounds	April 2, 1853	
	William J. Rounds	June 24, 1855	
	William H. Ruston	March 6, 1849	
	Simon B. Ryan	October 8, 1874	
	George A. Schofield	April 26, 1863	
	Frank Seiberlich	October 29, 1874	
	Henry Walter Seward	January 18, 1865	
	Alvin Arthur Shaw	November 17, 1857	
	Edmund C. Shepardson	December 2, 1848	
	James Clifford Sherman	May 23, 1874	
	Mark N. Skerrett	February 23, 1870	
	Arthur P. Sleeper	September 21, 1875	
	Oliver E. Slocum	February 9, 1837	
	Caleb L. Smith	June 23, 1849	
	Gurdon Southworth	March 27, 1846	
	John H. Spinlow	April 7, 1841	
	Frank J. Stanley	August 10, 1868	
	Henry Ellsworth Stanton	January 23, 1846	
	Everett J. Stevens	May 11, 1847	
	Edward Carleton Stone	June 29, 1878	
	Isaac M. Story	April 28, 1855	
	Peter F. Sullivan	June 29, 1871	
	Thomas Sutton	April 2, 1850	
	Arthur M. Taft	January 28, 1854	
	George W. Tapley	September 1, 1835	
	Francois Xavier Tetrault	November 5, 1845	
	George Elery Thayer	May 12, 1862	
	Herbert W. Thayer	May 7, 1858	
	George Henry Thorburn	February 21, 1866	
	Charles Harrison Tucker	May 19, 1867	
	Elliot Seth Tucker	May 31, 1872	
	George A. Turner	June 4, 1857	
	Samuel Willard Tyler	February 11, 1866	
	Charles L. Underhill	July 20, 1867	
	Arthur P. Vinal	June 14, 1854	
	Thomas Melville Vinson	April 27, 1868	
	Edward A. Walker	May 28, 1869	
	William H. Walker	November 30, 1857	
	Charles E. Ward	October 17, 1849	
	Peter F. Ward	January 16, 1877	
	Louis H. Warner	January 8, 1875	
	Edgar W. Warren	October 4, 1853	
	Henry Endicott Weatherbee	August 24, 1862	
	Fred Olvin Welsh	April 4, 1852	
	Henry O. Whiting	November 16, 1849	
	Charles F. Wildes	October 17, 1848	
	Lombard Williams	November 7, 1874	
	Thomas W. Williams	September 15, 1865	
	Gordon Willis	January 13, 1851	
	Charles H. Winslow	May 22, 1866	

== See also ==
- 58th United States Congress
- List of Massachusetts General Courts
