= Charles Innes =

Charles Innes may refer to:

- Charles Hiller Innes (1870–1939), lawyer and politician in Massachusetts
- Charles John Innes (1901–1971), lawyer and politician in Massachusetts
- Charles Alexander Innes (1874–1959), Governor of the British Crown Colony of Burma
- Charles Innes of the Innes baronets

== See also ==
- Charles Innes-Ker, Marquess of Bowmont and Cessford (born 1981), British aristocrat
