= Senator Innes =

Senator Innes may refer to:

- Charles Hiller Innes (1870–1939), Massachusetts State Senate
- Charles John Innes (1901–1971), Massachusetts State Senate
- Daniel Innis (born 1963), New Hampshire State Senate
