= Senator Currier =

Senator Currier may refer to:

- Frank D. Currier (1853–1921), New Hampshire State Senate
- Guy W. Currier (1867–1930), Massachusetts State Senate
- Moody Currier (1806–1898), New Hampshire State Senate
