= George Edwin Smith =

American politician

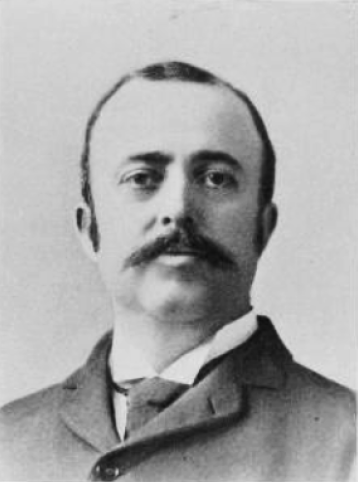

President of the Massachusetts Senate
- In office 1898–1904
- Preceded by: George P. Lawrence
- Succeeded by: Rufus A. Soule

Member of the Massachusetts Senate
- In office 1897–1900
- Succeeded by: George R. Jones
- Majority: 3,179 (1899 election)

Member of the Massachusetts House of Representatives Eight Middlesex District
- In office 1883–1884

1st City Solicitor of Everett, Massachusetts
- In office 1893–1894

Personal details
- Born: April 5, 1849 New Hampton, New Hampshire
- Died: April 26, 1919 (aged 70) Boston, Massachusetts
- Party: Republican
- Spouse(s): Sarah Frances Weld, m. October 31, 1876
- Education: Bates College

George Edwin Smith (April 5, 1849 – April 26, 1919) was a Massachusetts lawyer, legal writer, and politician. He served three terms as the President of the Massachusetts Senate. Previous to his assumption of the Senate Presidency, he served as a member of the Massachusetts Senate, elected from the Massachusetts House of Representatives.

== Early life and education ==
George Edwin Smith was born on April 5, 1849, in New Hampton, New Hampshire to David H. and Esther Perkins. He was educated in common schools in New Hampton and began his formal education at the Nichols Latin School before enrolling at Bates College in Lewiston, Maine. He graduated from Bates, with high honors, in 1873. His time at Bates sparked his interest in the law, and he began to clerk for the at-the-time Maine Senator, William P. Frye, at his private legal firm. Smith went on to pass the Suffolk County bar in Boston in May 1973.

== Early political career ==
In his early political career he was elected to the Massachusetts House of Representatives, representing the 8th Middlesex District comprising Malden and Everett, in 1883. He was subsequently re-elected 1884 with an increased voting turnout.

In 1892, he was a candidate for Mayor of Everett, and the lead the town into conception. He went on to serve on the Board of Trustees of the Public Library of Massachusetts, and chaired the committee that drew the charter for the newly founded city of Everett.

== Other business and educational pursuits ==
In 1879, he was elected by the alumni of Bates College to serves on the board of overseers. In 1884, he was appointed by the Bates Corporation to serve on the board of the president and was selected as a fellow of the college.

He also served as the president of the Glendon Club.

== Death ==
Smith died at the Parker House Hotel in Boston, Massachusetts on April 26, 1919.

== See also ==
- 119th Massachusetts General Court (1898)
- 121st Massachusetts General Court (1900)

Political offices
Preceded by George P. Lawrence	President of the Massachusetts Senate; 1898-1900	Succeeded by Rufus A. Soule
