= Henry O. Sawyer =

American politician (1844–1909)

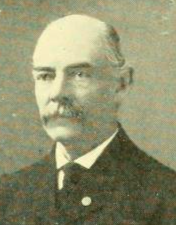
- Sawyer as a member of the Massachusetts House of Representatives

Member of the Massachusetts House of Representatives from the 12th Worcester District
- In office 1906–1907

Mayor of Fitchburg, Massachusetts
- In office 1904–1906
- Preceded by: Charles H. Blood
- Succeeded by: James H. McMahon

Member of the Massachusetts House of Representatives from the 16th Worcester District
- In office 1881

Personal details
- Born: June 10, 1844 Berlin, Massachusetts, U.S.
- Died: November 17, 1909 (aged 65)
- Party: Republican

Henry O. Sawyer (June 10, 1844 – November 17, 1909) was an American politician who was a member of the Massachusetts House of Representatives in 1881, 1906, and 1907 and mayor of Fitchburg, Massachusetts in 1904 and 1905.

== Early life ==
Sawyer was born in Berlin, Massachusetts on June 10, 1844. He attended the local public schools as well as a private school in Lancaster, Massachusetts. He served in the Union army during the American Civil War. He enlisted in the 42nd Massachusetts Infantry Regiment on July 22, 1864 and was mustered out on November 11, 1864.

== West Boylston ==
Sawyer spent most of his life in West Boylston, Massachusetts. He owned a store in the town and represented the area in the Massachusetts House of Representatives in 1881. He was a delegate to the 1888 Republican National Convention. In 1898, Sawyer sued the Metropolitan Water Board, alleging that the construction of the Wachusett Reservoir had harmed his business by forcing his customers to move away and the $3,250 he had been awarded by the board was insufficient. His case made it to the Massachusetts Supreme Judicial Court, which ruled in favor of the water board.

== Fitchburg ==
Sawyer moved to Fitchburg in 1899, and worked as an undertaker. He represented he spent two terms as the ward 5 member of the board of aldermen. In 1903, he was the citizens' temperance candidate for mayor and defeated incumbent Charles H. Blood by 689 votes. He was reelected in 1904 in a four candidate race. In 1906 and 1907, he represented the 12th Worcester district in the Massachusetts House of Representatives. He was a member of the committee on street railways during both terms. Sawyer died on November 17, 1909.
