= Loyed Ellis Chamberlain =

American politician

Loyed Ellis Chamberlain (January 30, 1856–?) was a lawyer, state senator, and judge in Massachusetts. He lived in Brockton. He was a Republican.

He was born in Plympton. His family moved to what became Brockton when he was an infant. He attended peace conferences and was involved in several civic organizations.

He partnered with Eliot L. Packard to form the law firm Packard & Chamberlain and later formed Chamberlain & Fletcher with Elmer H. Fletcher. He married and had two sons.

He was a police court judge. He served as solicitor of Brockton.

== See also ==
- 1898 Massachusetts legislature
- 1899 Massachusetts legislature
- 1900 Massachusetts legislature
- 1901 Massachusetts legislature
