= Arthur Clark (Massachusetts politician) =

American politician

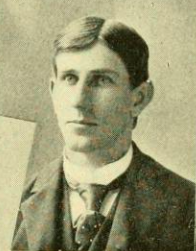
Arthur Clark

Arthur Clark (born c. 1878) was an American politician who represented Dedham, Massachusetts in the Great and General Court. He was elected in 1900 at 22 years old and was the youngest member of the Massachusetts House of Representatives. He chose not to stand for reelection in 1902.

He attended the dedication of St. Mary's Church.
