= James J. Myers =

American politician

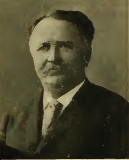

Speaker of the Massachusetts House of Representatives
- In office 1900–1903
- Preceded by: John L. Bates
- Succeeded by: Louis A. Frothingham

Personal details
- Born: November 20, 1842 Frewsburg, New York, U.S.
- Died: April 13, 1915 (aged 72) Cambridge, Massachusetts, U.S.
- Party: Republican
- Education: Harvard College, 1869; Harvard Law School
- Profession: Lawyer

James Jefferson Myers (November 20, 1842 – April 13, 1915) was a U.S. lawyer and politician who served as the Speaker of the Massachusetts House of Representatives from 1900 to 1903.

== Early life and education ==
Myers was born on his family's farm near Frewsberg, New York, he descended from Dutch and English ancestry. Myers graduated from Harvard College in 1869, and from Harvard Law School in 1872.

He died at his home in Cambridge on April 13, 1915.

== See also ==
- 121st Massachusetts General Court (1900)
- 122nd Massachusetts General Court (1901)
- 123rd Massachusetts General Court (1902)
- 124th Massachusetts General Court (1903)

Massachusetts House of Representatives
| Preceded by John L. Bates | Speaker of the Massachusetts House of Representatives; 1900 — 1903 | Succeeded by Louis A. Frothingham |
