= John Andrew Sullivan =

Former U.S. Representative from Massachusetts (1868–1927)

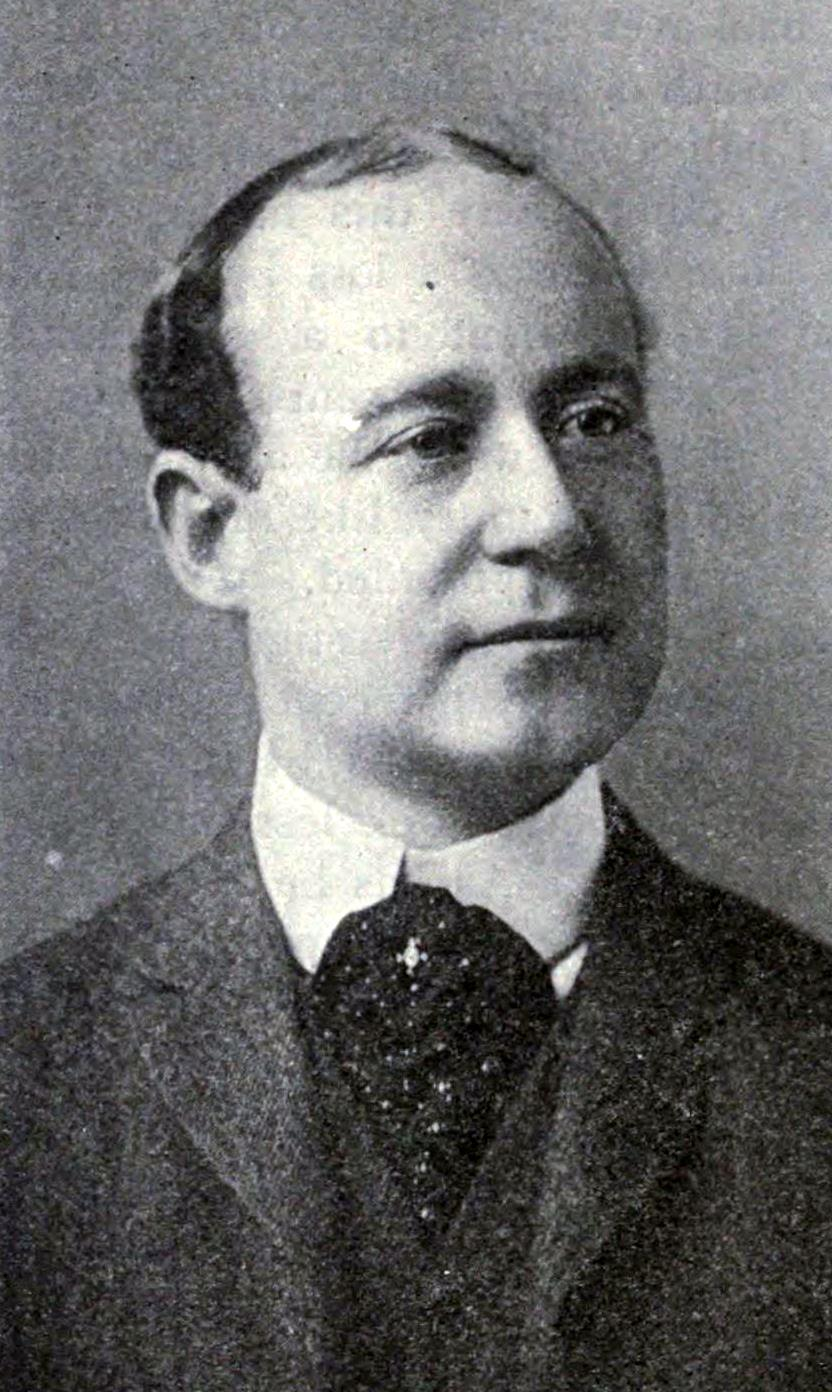

Member of the U.S. House of Representatives from Massachusetts's 11th district
- In office March 4, 1903 – March 3, 1907
- Preceded by: Samuel L. Powers
- Succeeded by: Andrew James Peters

Member of the Massachusetts State Senate Fifth Suffolk District
- In office 1900-1902
- Preceded by: Charles Hiller Innes
- Succeeded by: Charles S. Clerke

Personal details
- Born: May 10, 1868 Boston, Massachusetts, US
- Died: May 31, 1927 (aged 59) Scituate, Massachusetts, US
- Resting place: Holy Cross Cemetery, Malden, Massachusetts
- Party: Democratic
- Education: Boston University Law School
- Profession: Lawyer

John Andrew Sullivan (May 10, 1868 – May 31, 1927) was a U.S. representative from Massachusetts.

Born in Boston, Massachusetts, Sullivan attended the common and high schools. He was graduated from the Boston University Law School in 1896. He was admitted to the bar the same year and commenced practice in Boston, Massachusetts. He served as member of the Massachusetts State Senate 1900-1902.

Sullivan was elected as a Democrat to the Fifty-eighth and Fifty-ninth Congresses (March 4, 1903 – March 3, 1907). He declined to be a candidate for renomination. He resumed the practice of law in Boston, Massachusetts.

He was appointed a member of the Boston Finance Commission in July 1907 and served until the commission expired. In June 1909, Sullivan became chairman of the permanent Boston Finance Commission. He resigned in 1914 to become corporation counsel of Boston. Later, he was a lecturer on municipal government at Harvard University in 1912 and 1913 and then at Boston University Law School from 1920 to 1925. Sullivan resumed the practice of his profession in Boston.

He died in Scituate, Massachusetts, May 31, 1927 and was interred in Holy Cross Cemetery, Malden, Massachusetts.

== Notes ==
Legal offices
Preceded by Joseph J. Corbett	Boston Corporation Counsel; 1914–1917	Succeeded by Alexander Whiteside
Political offices
Preceded by Position created	Chairman of the Boston Finance Commission; 1909–1914	Succeeded by John R. Murphy
U.S. House of Representatives
Preceded by Samuel L. Powers	Member of the U.S. House of Representatives from Massachusetts's 11th congressional district March 4, 1903 – March 3, 1907	Succeeded by Andrew James Peters
Political offices
Preceded by Charles Hiller Innes	Member of the Massachusetts State Senate; Fifth Suffolk District; 1900–1902	Succeeded by Charles S. Clerke
