= Charles N. Gardner =

American soldier who fought in the American Civil War

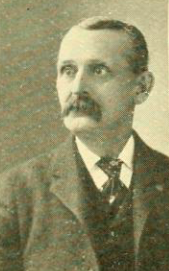
- A portrait of Charles N. Gardner
- Born: March 29, 1845; South Scituate, Massachusetts
- Died: February 22, 1919 (aged 73); Massachusetts
- Burial place: Norwell, Massachusetts
- Military career
- Allegiance: United States of America
- Branch: United States Army
- Service years: 1862 - 1865
- Rank: Second Lieutenant
- Units: Company E, 32nd Massachusetts Volunteer Infantry Regiment
- Conflicts: Battle of Five Forks; American Civil War
- Awards: Medal of Honor

Charles N. Gardner (March 29, 1845 – February 22, 1919) was an American soldier who fought in the American Civil War. Gardner received his country's highest award for bravery during combat, the Medal of Honor. Gardner's medal was won for capturing the flag at the Battle of Five Forks in Virginia on April 1, 1865. He was honored with the award on May 10, 1865.

Gardner joined the 18th Massachusetts Infantry in August 1862, and was transferred to the 32nd Massachusetts Infantry in October 1864. As a result of his MOH action, he was commissioned as a Second Lieutenant, and mustered out with his regiment in June 1865.

== Medal of Honor citation ==
The President of the United States of America, in the name of Congress, takes pleasure in presenting the Medal of Honor to Private Charles N. Gardner, United States Army, for extraordinary heroism on 1 April 1865, while serving with Company E, 32d Massachusetts Infantry, in action at Five Forks, Virginia, for capture of flag.

== See also ==
- List of American Civil War Medal of Honor recipients: G–L
