= George R. Jones =

American politician

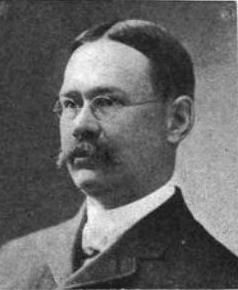

President of the Massachusetts Senate
- In office 1903–1904
- Preceded by: Rufus A. Soule
- Succeeded by: William F. Dana

Member of the Massachusetts Senate Fourth Middlesex District
- Preceded by: George E. Smith
- Majority: 3,194 (1903 election)

Member of the Massachusetts House of Representatives
- In office 1894–1894

Personal details
- Born: February 8, 1862 Lebanon, Maine
- Died: February 29, 1936 (aged 74)
- Education: Boston University, Boston University School of Law

George R. Jones (February 8, 1862 in Lebanon, Maine – February 29, 1936) was a Massachusetts lawyer and politician who served in the Massachusetts House of Representatives, and as a member, and President of, the Massachusetts Senate.

== See also ==
- 124th Massachusetts General Court (1903)
- 125th Massachusetts General Court (1904)

Political offices
| Preceded by Rufus A. Soule | President of the Massachusetts Senate; 1903-1904 | Succeeded by William F. Dana |
