= Charles H. Blood =

American jurist and politician (1857–1915)

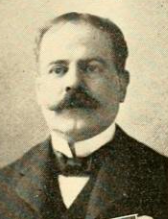
- Blood as a member of the Massachusetts House of Representatives

Mayor of Fitchburg, Massachusetts
- In office 1903–1904
- Preceded by: Charles Babbitt
- Succeeded by: Henry O. Sawyer

Member of the Massachusetts House of Representatives from the 13th Worcester District
- In office 1899–1901

Personal details
- Born: December 10, 1857 Fitchburg, Massachusetts, U.S.
- Died: April 3, 1915 (aged 57) Fitchburg, Massachusetts, U.S.
- Party: Republican
- Education: Harvard College; Boston University School of Law

Charles H. Blood (December 10, 1857 – April 3, 1915) was an American jurist and politician who was a member of the Massachusetts House of Representatives from 1899 to 1901 and mayor of Fitchburg, Massachusetts from 1903 to 1904.

== Early life ==
Blood was born in Fitchburg, on December 10, 1857, to Hiram A. and Mary (Person) Blood. His father was the third mayor of Fitchburg. Blood graduated from Fitchburg High School in 1875 and Harvard College in 1879. He read law with Massachusetts Attorney General George Marston and attended the Boston University School of Law from 1882 to 1883.

== Legal career ==
He was admitted to the Bristol County bar in 1883 and opened a law office in Fitchburg. He opened a second office in Boston. In 1884, he formed a partnership with David K. Stevens. From 1888 until his death, Blood was a special justice of the Fitchburg police court.

== Politics ==
Blood was a member of the Massachusetts House of Representatives from 1899 to 1901. He sought the Third Worcester district seat in the Massachusetts Senate in 1901, but lost the Republican Party (United States) nomination to incumbent Edward F. Blodgett.

In 1902, Blood was elected mayor of Fitchburg as the Independent Citizens' candidate. He was defeated for reelection by temperance candidate Henry O. Sawyer by 689 votes. He was the Independent Citizens' nominee in the 1904 and 1912 mayoral elections, but was defeated both times.

== Death ==
Blood died at his home in Fitchburg on April 3, 1915 after a long illness.
