= Peter F. Sullivan =

American politician

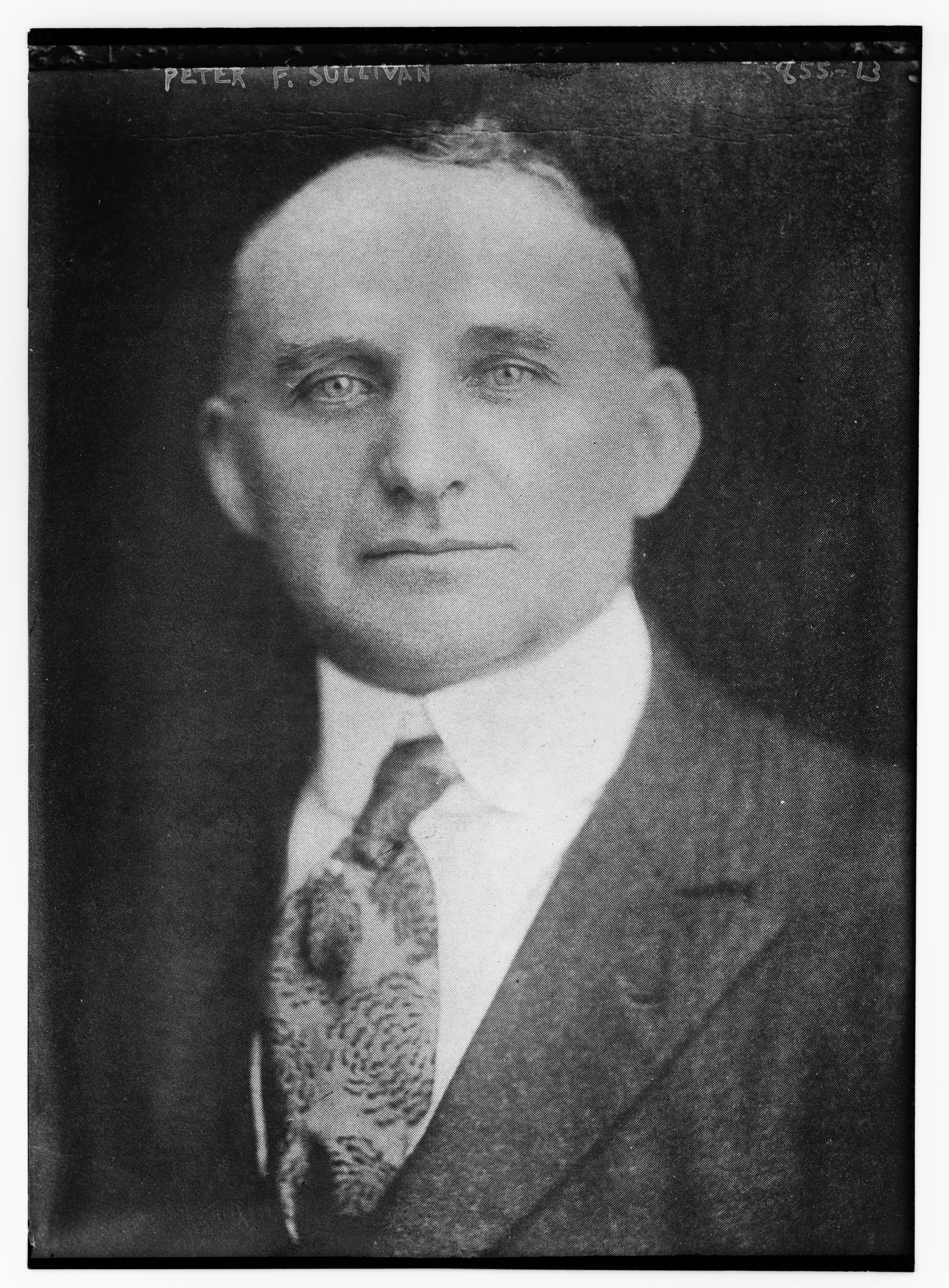

Mayor of Worcester, Massachusetts
- In office 1920–1923
- Preceded by: Pehr G. Holmes
- Succeeded by: Michael J. O'Hara

Member of the Massachusetts Senate for the 1st Worcester district
- In office 1919–1919
- Preceded by: James L. Harrop
- Succeeded by: Christian Nelson

Member of the Massachusetts House of Representatives for the 17th Worcester district
- In office 1901–1903
- Preceded by: William I. McLoughlin
- Succeeded by: Edward H. O'Brien

Personal details
- Born: June 29, 1869 Ireland
- Died: May 21, 1931 (aged 61) Worcester, Massachusetts
- Party: Democratic
- Occupation: Travel agency owner

Peter F. Sullivan (June 29, 1869 – May 21, 1931) was an American politician who served as mayor of Worcester, Massachusetts, and was a member of the Massachusetts General Court.

== Early life ==
Sullivan was born on June 29, 1869, in Ireland. He and his family moved to Worcester when he was five years old. Sullivan's father died when he was young he began working as a paperboy at the age of 10 to help support his large family. During the Spanish–American War he was a bugler in Co. G of the 9th Regiment and was a war correspondent for the Boston Post and the Worcester Gazette.

== Business career ==
Sullivan's first job was as a paperboy for the Telegram. He then worked in the printing trade before starting a newsstand and periodical store with his brother, Dennis. Sullivan later opened a steamship and railroad ticket agency and a bird store. The ticket agency was successful, but the bird business was eventually dropped.

== Politics ==
Sullivan represented the 17th Worcester district in the Massachusetts House of Representatives from 1901 to 1903. He was a member of the house insurance committee from 1901 to 1903 and the federal relations committee in 1903. In 1903 he was defeated for renomination by Edward H. O'Brien. From 1907 to 1910 he was a member of the Worcester Board of Aldermen. In 1919 he represented the 1st Worcester district in the Massachusetts Senate. In 1919 he was elected Mayor of Worcester. Following a 1920 blizzard, Sullivan, along with Clark College president Edmund Sanford, and Worcester Chamber of Commerce president Charles E. Hildreth, led a snow-clearing team of 8,000 volunteers, 2,000 city and railway employees, and 250 horse-drawn and motor vehicle apparatuses. Sullivan was reelected over George W. Wright in 1920 and Fred A. Minor in 1921. He was a candidate for the Democratic nomination in the 1922 Massachusetts gubernatorial election. He finished second in the Democratic primary behind former Boston mayor John F. Fitzgerald. In 1923 he arranged for a group of New England mayors to mediate a telephone operators' strike. In September 1923, Sullivan encouraged the citizens of Worcester to stay away from the Ku Klux Klan meeting at the Mechanics Hall. The meeting was held on September 27, 1923, and drew 2,500 KKK members or prospective members. A crowd of 25,000 gathered around the hall, however there were very few disturbances. In 1923, Sullivan was defeated for reelection by Michael J. O’Hara by 576 votes. In 1926, Sullivan was the Democratic nominee for the 4th congressional district seat in the United States House of Representatives. He lost to Republican incumbent George R. Stobbs 58% to 42%.

== Later life ==
Following his defeat, Sullivan led tour groups in Ireland. He and his groups sailed to his native country on the Celtic in 1925 and 1926, the Franconia in 1926, the Republic in 1927, the Laconia in 1928, the Cedric in 1929, and the Scythia and the St. Louis in 1930. Sullivan died on May 21, 1931, at his home in Worcester of pneumonia.
