= Frederic O. MacCartney =

American politician

Member of the Massachusetts House of Representatives
- In office November 1893 – May 25, 1903

Personal details
- Born: November 2, 1864 Prairie du Chien, Wisconsin, US
- Died: May 25, 1903 (aged 38) Rockland, Massachusetts, US
- Party: Social Democratic Party of America
- Education: Iowa College, Andover Theological Seminary

Frederic O. MacCartney (November 2, 1864 – May 25, 1903) was an American Unitarian minister and socialist politician. MacCartney is best remembered for having been elected to four terms of office in the state legislature of Massachusetts under the banner of the Social Democratic Party of America and its organizational successor, the Socialist Party of America.

== Biography ==
=== Early years ===
Frederic O. MacCartney was born November 2, 1864, in the town of Prairie du Chien, Wisconsin, the county seat of Crawford County, located in the rural southwestern corner of the state. His parents, Alexander MacCartney and the former Mary M. Jones, moved the family briefly to Denver, Colorado, when Frederic was six, before settling down for the next 13 years in Storm Lake, Iowa.

Very religious from the time of his youth, at the age of 17 MacCartney determined to dedicate his life to the Christian church. He attended Iowa College, now known as Grinnell College, from which he graduated in 1889. Thereafter he entered the Andover Theological Seminary in Andover, Massachusetts, finishing there in 1893. Originally a Congregationalist, MacCartney switched his religious affiliation to Unitarianism at this juncture.

MacCartney was married in 1889, but his wife died after just six months of marriage. He never remarried. Following his time in divinity school, MacCartney preached for one year at the Second Unitarian Church of Boston, followed by a five-year stint at the Unitarian Church of Rockland, Massachusetts.

=== Turn to socialism ===
The Unitarian minister was won to the idea of socialism during his student years at Andover when in the winter of 1890 he read Looking Backward, a utopian novel written by Edward Bellamy. The experience was a powerful one, MacCartney later recalled, as he found his eyes "opened somewhat" with respect to "the vital relationship between [his] religious ideals and the constructive principles advanced by Bellamy."

In 1892 MacCartney affiliated himself with the People's Party, attracted by that organization's program calling for national and state ownership of major industry and the adoption of direct legislation. He continued to support this organization through 1896, casting his Presidential ballot in that year for William Jennings Bryan.

MacCartney continued to read about socialism in subsequent years, until finally deciding to leave his position with the church in June 1899 so as to dedicate all of his effort to the newly formed Social Democratic Party of America. He told a party comrade at the time:

I believe in and love the preaching of the higher life to the people, and had expected to spend my whole life in doing it. But I have been growing more and more profoundly interested in the Socialist movement, until I have finally awakened to a realization that it, and not the Church work, holds first place in my thoughts and interest. There is but one course open to me — to resign my pastorate and put in my work where my heart is.

=== Legislative career ===
MacCartney was named as a candidate for legislature by the Massachusetts Social Democratic Party in the November 1899 election, running against a former state legislator in the 4th Plymouth District, previously regarded as conservative and solidly Republican. Social Democrats worked hard over the course of several weeks holding a series of rallies were held in the three towns of the district — Rockland, Hanover, and Hanson — with MacCartney ultimately emerging victorious in the three-way race by a plurality of 102 votes. The unexpected result was met with jubilation by MacCartney's supporters, with one group parading a banner through the streets of Rockland with a banner inscribed, "What's the matter with MacCartney? He's all right."

MacCartney's surprising 1899 success was lasting and he was returned to office by his constituents in the 4th District in each of the three subsequent annual elections.

MacCartney was joined by James F. Carey as elected socialists in the Massachusetts legislature. Carey, hailing from the town of Haverhill, had been elected previously in tandem with fellow Haverhill resident John C. Chase, although Chase was defeated in a subsequent bid for reelection. MacCartney and Carey, both able speakers, conducted joint work at the state capitol in Boston advancing the SDP's legislative agenda.

At the March 1900 Nominating Convention of the Social Democratic Party, MacCartney was tapped to deliver the speech nominating Eugene V. Debs for what would be the first of his five runs for President of the United States. MacCartney made extensive use of Christian imagery in his speech, declaring that Debs during his 1895 imprisonment in connection with the Pullman Strike had undergone a transformation akin to the author of the Book of Revelation, John of Patmos:

[H]e had revealed to him a vision of things that were to be, of the new kingdom, of the new era ... When he came forth from that tomb it was to a resurrection of life and the first message that he gave to his class ... was a message of liberty.

=== Death and legacy ===
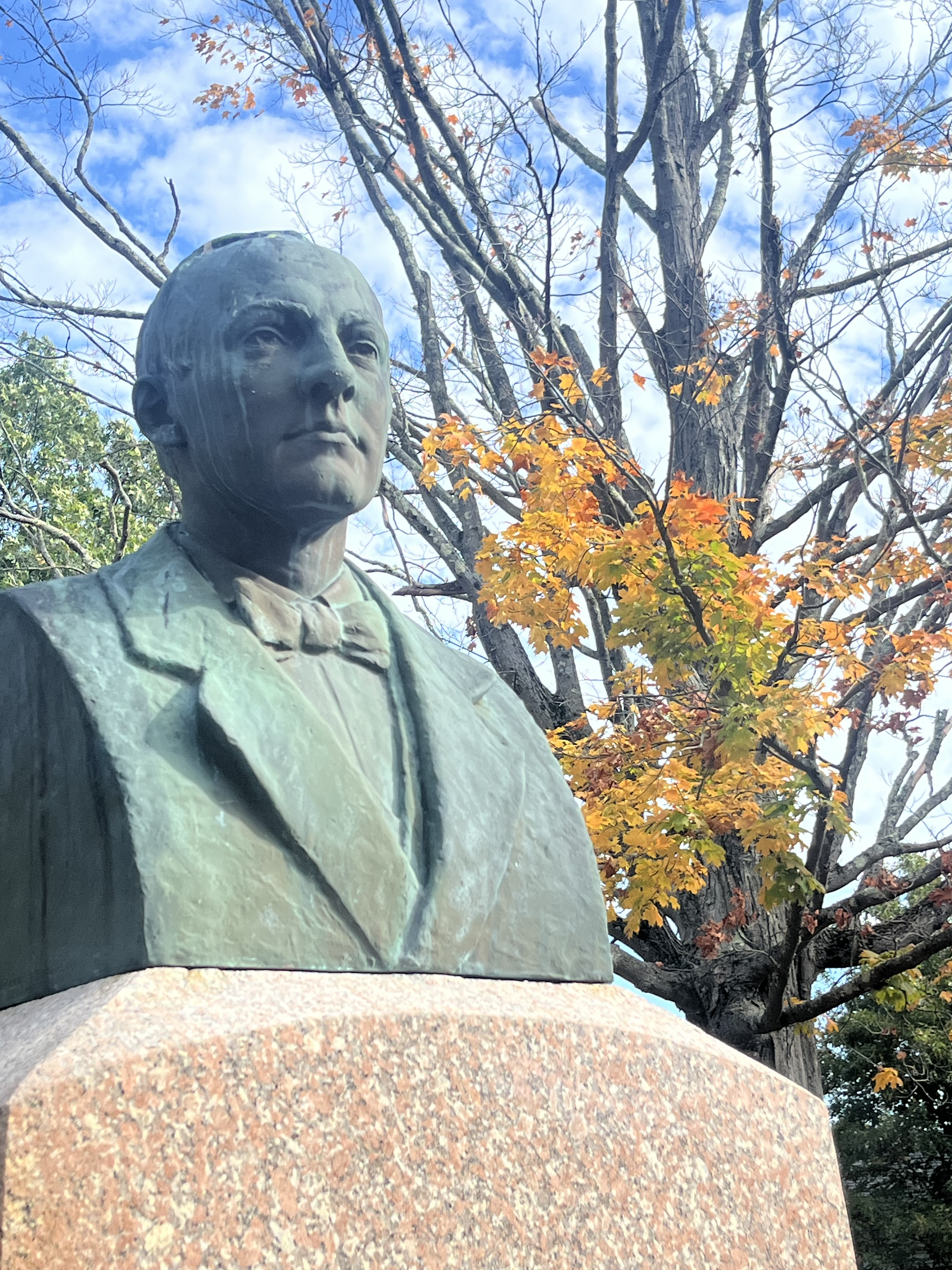
Bust and Gravestone Marker of Frederic O. MacCartney

MacCartney died of bronchial pneumonia on May 25, 1903, at Rockland, Massachusetts, following an illness of 11 days. Still a member of the Massachusetts legislature he was just 38 years old at the time of his death.

Under a headline reading "Fought for Mankind; Kind Words from All," the Boston Herald lauded MacCartney's mission, noting that "never in the history of Rockland" had a dead individual been so honored as MacCartney:

The business places and the public schools were closed, and all work was suspended during the services. Flags were displayed at half-staff from all public buildings ... A guard of honor accompanied the remains. From 9 until 2 o'clock hundreds of people from Rockland and the surrounding towns visited the church and paid their last respects to their friend. At 1:30 a special train brought in many people prominent in politics and labor circles ... The funeral was attended by all classes and creeds. The Rockland clergy were present in a body, the town officials, the school teachers, prominent labor leaders of this and other towns, the leading officials of the Socialist Party of this state, and a number of workers from other states.

The funeral eulogy was delivered by James F. Carey, one of nine members of the Massachusetts state legislature in attendance, who remembered his friend as one who "had the joy of sowing the seeds of liberty, of equality, of fraternity."

== Works ==
- Decadence in Public Functions: A Series of Three Sermons on the Pulpit, Press, and Politics. Rockland, MA: H.B. Loud & Co., 1896.
- The Old Slavery and the New: This Sermon was Delivered...on Memorial Sunday, May 24, 1896, in the Church of the Unitarian Society of Rockland, Mass. Rockland, MA: H.B. Loud & Co., 1896.
- Cuba, Oppressed and Starving; and the Duty of Intervention: Two Sermons Delivered in Canning Pulpit on March 20th and 27th, 1898. Rockland, MA: n.p., 1898.
- "How I Became a Socialist," The Comrade [New York], vol. 1, no. 12 (Dec. 1901), pp. 266–267.
