= Thomas F. Porter =

American politician

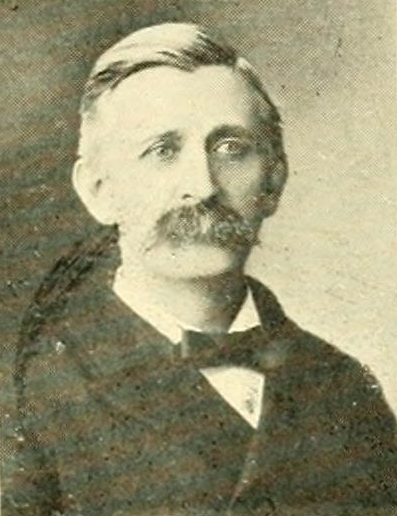

32nd Mayor of Lynn, Massachusetts
- In office 1908–1909
- Preceded by: Charles Neal Barney
- Succeeded by: James E. Rich

Member of the Massachusetts Senate 1st Essex District
- In office 1902–1903
- Preceded by: Henry Converse Atwill
- Succeeded by: William F. Craig

Member of the Massachusetts House of Representatives 12th Essex District

Member of the Lynn, Massachusetts Board of Aldermen
- In office 1896–1897

Member of the Lynn, Massachusetts Common Council
- In office 1885–1888

Personal details
- Born: October 30, 1847 Paradise, Nova Scotia
- Died: July 12, 1927 (aged 79) North Conway, New Hampshire, US
- Party: Republican

Thomas Freeman Porter (October 30, 1847 – July 12, 1927) was an American politician who served as the 32nd Mayor of Lynn, Massachusetts.

Porter was born in Paradise, Nova Scotia. Freeman worked for a time at the Danbury News before he settled in Massachusetts. He was considered "a fine literary talent" by an early reviewer, as evidenced by his contributions to The Judge, the Boston Journal, the Yankee Blade, and the Waverley Magazine. He was an Odd Fellow and a member of the Masons.

== See also ==
- 124th Massachusetts General Court (1903)

Political offices
Preceded by Charles Neal Barney	Mayor of Lynn, Massachusetts; 1908 to 1908	Succeeded by James E. Rich
Preceded by Henry C. Atwill	Member of the Massachusetts Senate; 1st Essex District; 1902 to 1903	Succeeded by William F. Craig
