= Albert S. Apsey =

American politician

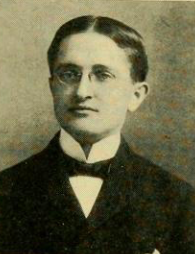

Member of the Massachusetts Senate
- In office 1902–1903
- Constituency: Second Middlesex Senatorial District

Member of the Massachusetts House of Representatives
- In office 1898–1901
- Preceded by: David T. Dickinson
- Constituency: Fifth Middlesex District

President of the Cambridge Common Council
- In office 1897

Personal details
- Born: Albert Stokes Apsey; November 27, 1870 Cambridge, Massachusetts, US
- Died: November 30, 1928 (aged 58) Cambridge, Massachusetts, US
- Party: Republican
- Spouse: Laura Louise Soule (m. 1896)

Albert Stokes Apsey (1870–1928) was a lawyer and politician in Massachusetts who served in the Massachusetts House of Representatives and Massachusetts Senate. He was a Republican.

== Biography ==
Albert S. Apsey was born in Cambridge, Massachusetts on November 27, 1870. He attended school in Cambridge, and graduated from Harvard College and Harvard Law School. He was president of the Riverbank Court Hotel and served as a director and on the boards of various other businesses and civic groups. He lived at 150 Brattles Street.

He married Laura Louise Soule in Cambridge on May 2, 1896, and they had two children.

He served on the Cambridge Common Council from 1895 through 1897, including as its president in 1897. He was a member of the Massachusetts House of Representatives from 1898 to 1901 and in the Massachusetts Senate in 1802 and 1903. In 1910 he was appointed by the governor of Massachusetts to chair a committee investigating and seeking to reform the inspection of factories.

He succeeded David T. Dickinson in the Massachusetts House of Representatives. He represented the Fifth Middlesex District.

He represented the Second Middlesex Senatorial District for one term. He did not seek reelection.

He wrote A brief synopsis of the principal provisions of the New Workingmen's Compensation Act (so called) published in 1911.

Apsey died at his home in Cambridge on November 30, 1928.

He was described as possessing the "countenance of aristocratic paleness, matured sagacity, and patrician poise."

== See also ==
- 1899 Massachusetts legislature
- 1902 Massachusetts legislature
