= Guy W. Currier =

American lawyer and politician

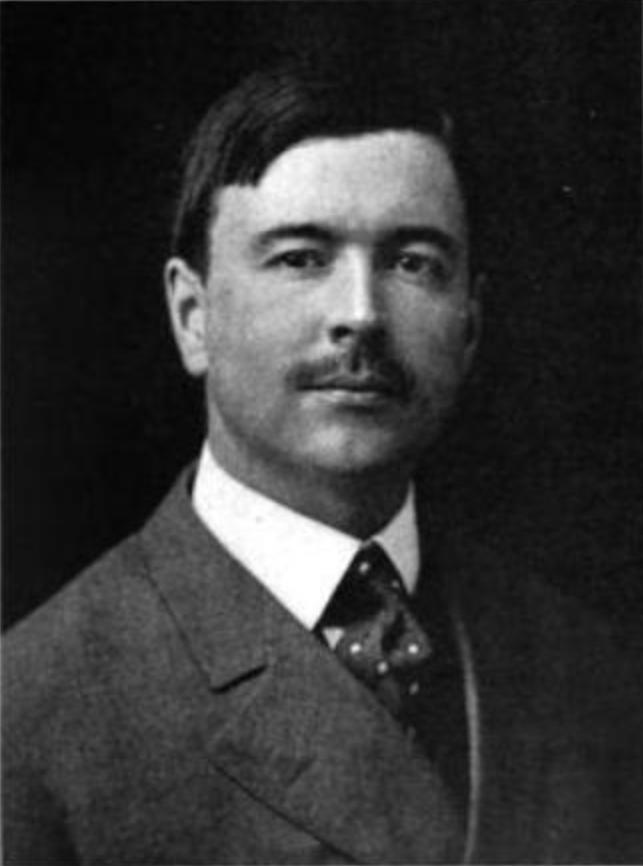

Member of the Massachusetts Senate
- In office 1900–1901

Member of the Massachusetts House of Representatives
- In office 1899

Personal details
- Born: December 22, 1867 Lawrence, Massachusetts, U.S.
- Died: June 21, 1930 (aged 62) Peterborough, New Hampshire, U.S.
- Party: Democratic Party
- Education: Massachusetts Institute of Technology; Boston University School of Law

Guy Wilbur Currier (December 22, 1867 – June 21, 1930) was a lawyer and politician in Massachusetts. He served in both houses of the Massachusetts legislature (Massachusetts General Court).

Currier received his undergraduate degree from the Massachusetts Institute of Technology, and his law degree from Boston University School of Law. He married actress Marie Burress in 1894. She was part of the Boston Museum Stock Company. As Mrs. Guy Currier, she established Four Wind Farm, later known as Mariarden, an outdoor theater and theater training program.

An ally of Calvin Coolidge, Currier had social distinction, wealth, personal charm and broad circle of friends which Coolidge lacked, and which would have a lasting impact on his political career. He was a Democrat. From 1922 to 1930, Currier was a Trustee of the Boston Public Library.

Currier died at his summer home in Peterborough, New Hampshire, at the age of 62. His son, also named Guy Currier (died 1958), graduated from Yale University and Cambridge University.
