= Charles Hiller Innes =

American politician (1870–1939)

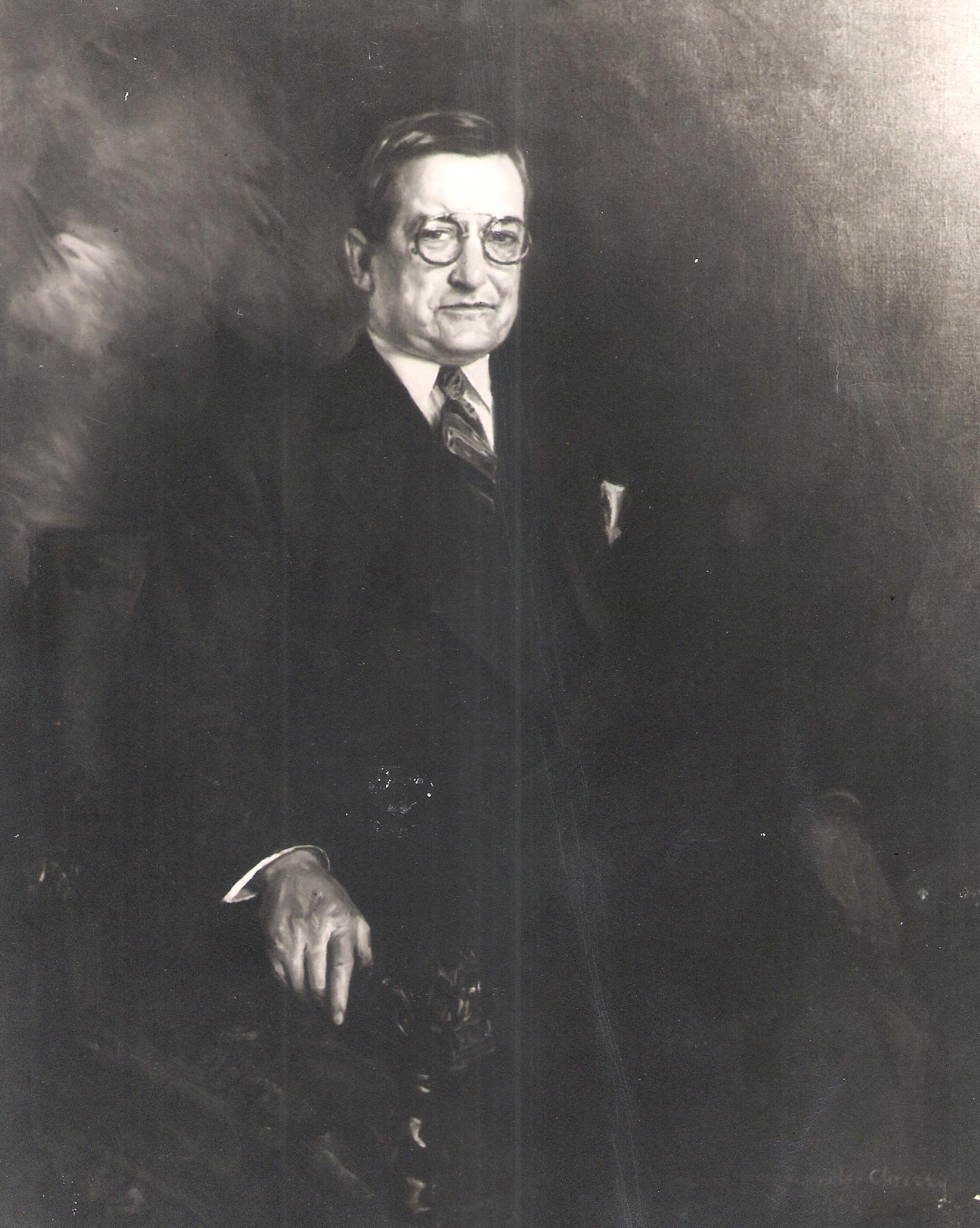
- Portrait by the artist Howard Chandler Christy on display at Suffolk University's Sawyer Library

Member of the Massachusetts Senate
- In office 1899–1900
- Succeeded by: John Andrew Sullivan

Member of the Massachusetts House of Representatives
- In office 1897–1898

Member of the Boston Common Council
- In office 1896–1896

Personal details
- Born: August 6, 1870 Boston, Massachusetts
- Died: May 27, 1939 (aged 68)
- Resting place: Forest Hills Cemetery, Jamaica Plain, Massachusetts
- Relatives: Charles John Innes (son)

Charles Hiller Innes (August 6, 1870 in Boston, Massachusetts – May 27, 1939) was a lawyer and politician who led the Massachusetts Republican Party during the 1910s and 1920s.

== Legal career ==
Innes graduated from Boston University School of Law in 1892. He was admitted to the bar of the Supreme Judicial Court of Massachusetts in 1892 and to the bar of the Supreme Court of the United States in 1901. In 1898 he and a classmate, James H. Vahey, started their own firm. They were joined by Philip Mansfield in 1905.

Upon his graduation from law school, Innes conducted evening courses in his law office for the preparation of candidates for the bar. These classes were the first evening courses of their kind established in the state; furthermore, Innes founded the first night law school in the United States known as the Charles H. Innes Law Association. Innes' vision was to have a night law school that would be open to all mankind. More than nine hundred members of the Massachusetts Bar and bench were trained in Innes' night law school.

== Politics ==
In 1896, Innes was elected to the Boston City Council and from 1897 to 1898, Innes served in the Massachusetts House of Representatives. He served two terms in the Massachusetts State Senate from 1899 to 1900. Innes was Chairman of the Republican State Committee and a Delegate to the Republican National Convention in 1908, 1912, 1916, 1920 and 1924, as well as counsel for the Republican National Committee. He was defeated in his bid to be a delegate to 1928 convention by Henry Parkman Jr., who ran a high-profile campaign against Innes, claiming that "Innes does not represent the party, but only a small number who have made a business out of politics".

According to theatre critic Elliot Norton, "Charles H. Innes was considered the afternoon mayor of Boston,” due to his political influence He was noted for his leadership of the Republican Party in Massachusetts. He was known as a practical politician, and his leadership was indispensable to making Republicans such as Calvin Coolidge and Channing Cox governors of Massachusetts. In addition, Innes played a key role in securing passage of the bill that provided the funding for the construction of the Cape Cod Canal.

== Legacy ==
In 1928, the Charles H. Innes Law Association presented $5000 to Boston University Law School for the establishment of the Charles H. Innes Law Association Scholarship.

The Charles H. Innes Memorial Underpass was dedicated to Innes in honor of his career in public service and it is located at the roundabout where Huntington Avenue passes under Massachusetts Avenue in Boston. A bronze plaque in his honor reads: "The Charles H. Innes Memorial Underpass, Dedicated to the memory of Charles Hiller Innes, 1870-1939, Lawyer - Legislator, Teacher of Law, Prominent in affairs of the city, state and nation. Noted for his capacity for friendship and his lifetime of devotion to the interests of the people of this district. November 6, 1941."

Charles Hiller Innes is interred in Forest Hills Cemetery, Jamaica Plain, Massachusetts.
