= Rufus Albertson Soule =

American politician

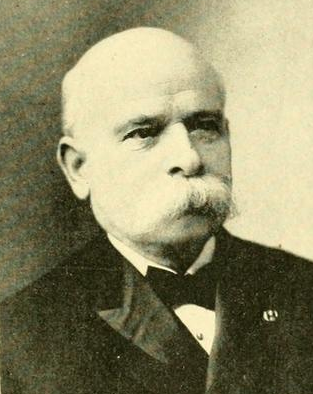

Rufus Albertson Soule Sr. (March 16, 1839 – January 9, 1913) was a politician in Massachusetts. He served in the 1901 Massachusetts legislature and the 1902 Massachusetts legislature as president of the senate both years. Winthrop M. Crane was governor.

== Biography ==
Rufus Albertson Soule was born in Mattapoisett, Massachusetts on March 16, 1839.

He served in the American Civil War along with two of his brothers, one of whom died during the conflict. His brother William Thomas Soule served as New Bedford's mayor in 1878. Rufus Soule also served as Customs Collector and was the subject.of an editorial cartoon. He owned the Soule Mills established in 1902.

After the war, he got into the shoe business with a partner he served with in the war. He first served in the Massachusetts state legislature in 1878 and 1879 following time on the New Bedford Common Council including as president.

He married Susan C. Nesmith on August 28, 1860, and they had three children, including Rufus Albertson Soule Jr.

He died in New Bedford on January 9, 1913.

== See also ==
- 1878 Massachusetts legislature
