= W. T. A. Fitzgerald =

American politician (1871–1948)

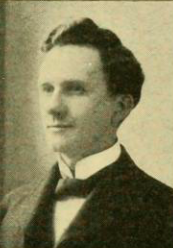
- A portrait of William T. A. Fitzgerald

Register of Deeds of Suffolk County, Massachusetts
- In office 1906–1946
- Preceded by: Thomas Delaney
- Succeeded by: Leo J. Sullivan

Personal details
- Born: December 19, 1871 Boston, Massachusetts, U.S.
- Died: February 24, 1948 (aged 76) Newton, Massachusetts, U.S.
- Party: Democratic
- Education: Boston University School of Law

William T. A. Fitzgerald (December 19, 1871 – February 24, 1948) was an American politician from Boston who served as Register of Deeds of Suffolk County, Massachusetts from 1906 to 1946.

== Early life ==
Fitzgerald was born on December 19, 1871, in Boston's North End. While he was a small child, Fitzgerald's family moved to the South Cove section of the city. During his youth, Fitzgerald was a pitcher for the South Cove Maroons amateur baseball team. He graduated from Boston University School of Law and was admitted to the bar in 1897. On November 25, 1900, he married Ellen T. Butler.

== Political career ==
Fitzgerald was elected to the Boston Common Council in 1896. From 1898 to 1900 he was a member of the Massachusetts House of Representatives. He then served in the Massachusetts Senate from 1901 to 1903. From 1902 to 1905 he was president of the Boston Democratic city committee. In 1925 he was a candidate for Mayor of Boston. He finished 7th in the ten candidate field with 2% of the vote.

From 1906 to 1946, Fitzgerald was Register of Deeds for Suffolk County. During his tenure, Fitzgerald drafted bills that authorized short forms of deeds and mortgages, protected rights of plaintiffs in attachment cases, prevented mortgage fraud, authorized direct transfer of real estate between spouses, and gave married partners equal rights in the real estate of the other. He was defeated for reelection in 1946 by state senator Leo J. Sullivan.

Fitzgerald died on February 24, 1948, at a convalescent hospital in Newton, Massachusetts. He was survived by his wife and six children.
