= James F. Carey =

American socialist politician

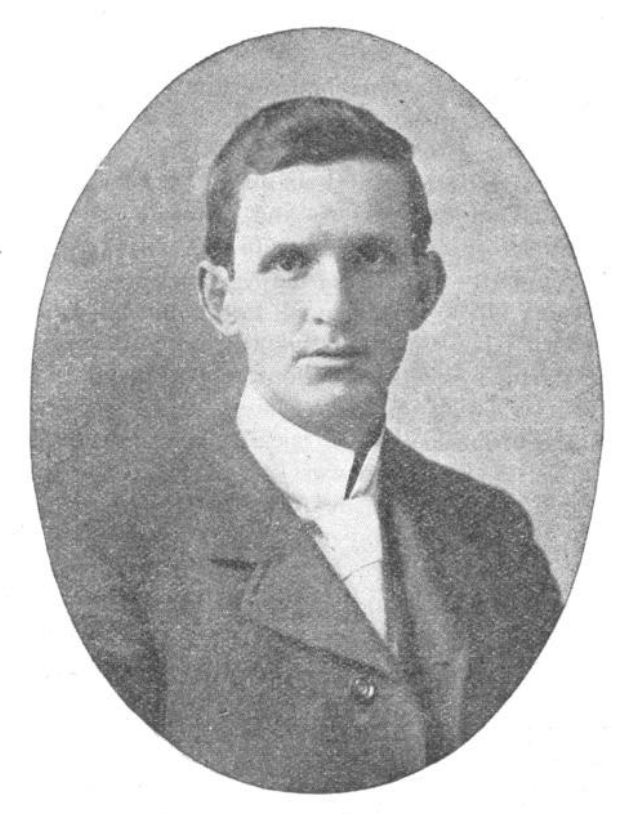

Member of the Massachusetts House of Representatives from the 5th Essex district
- In office January 4, 1899 – January 4, 1904
- Preceded by: George H. Bartlett
- Succeeded by: William L. Adams

Personal details
- Born: August 19, 1867 Haverhill, Massachusetts, U.S.
- Died: December 31, 1938 (age 71)
- Party: Social Democratic (1899–1903); Socialist (after 1903)

James Francis Carey (August 19, 1867 in Haverhill, Massachusetts — December 31, 1938) was an American cobbler and Socialist politician from Massachusetts.

Carey's political activism began when, as a shoemaker, he joined the International Boot and Shoemakers' Union; in 1895, he chaired a convention in Boston which merged three national shoemaker unions into one. He was an activist in the Socialist Labor Party of America, and later in the Socialist Party of America. He served in a number of leading roles with the Socialist Party of Massachusetts. In 1898, when he was elected to the Common Council of Haverhill, Massachusetts from Ward 5, Carey became the first socialist elected to municipal office in the United States.

He was also elected to represent the fifth ward of Haverhill in the Massachusetts House of Representatives each year from 1899 to 1903. In 1902, when Prince Henry of Prussia visited the Massachusetts State House of Representatives, Carey - as the lone Socialist Party member in the chamber - put on his cap, stood up, and walked out of the chamber at the exact moment Prince Henry walked in as a means of protesting Henry's warm welcome to the state.
