= John Dennis Hammond Gauss =

American politician (1861–1933)

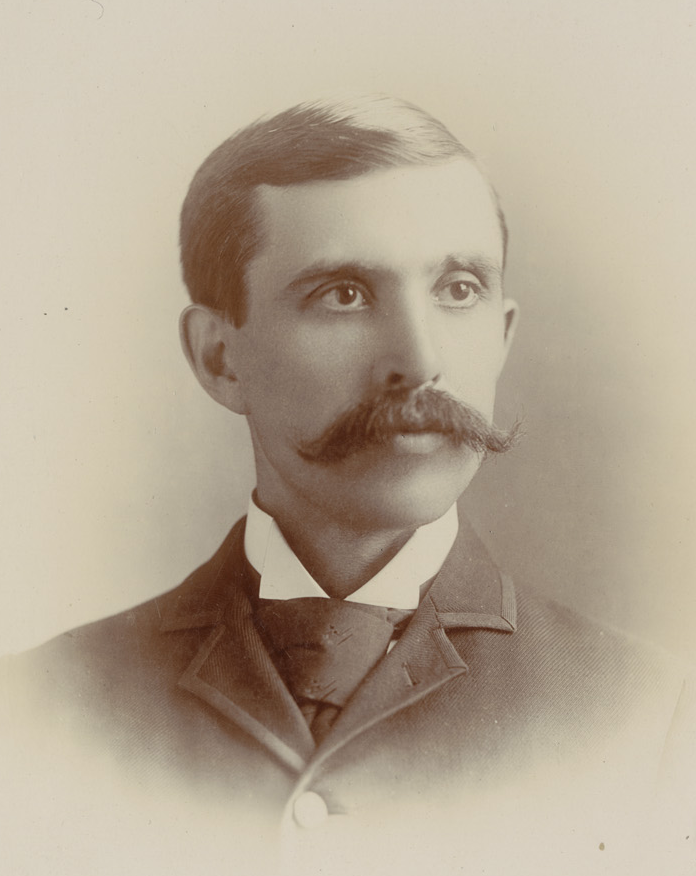

John Dennis Hammond Gauss (January 4, 1861–1933) was a state legislator in Massachusetts. He was a Republican.

A native of Salem, Massachusetts, he worked at the Salem Observer newspaper in Salem, eventually becoming its editor and proprietor. He served on the Salem School Committee. He served as president of the Salem Press Club and was part of various fraternal organizations. He married twice and had four children.

== See also ==
- 1894 Massachusetts legislature
- 1895 Massachusetts legislature
- 1896 Massachusetts legislature
- 1897 Massachusetts legislature
- 1898 Massachusetts legislature
