= 1895 Massachusetts legislature =

116th Massachusetts General Court
←	115th	117th	→

Overview
- Legislative body: General Court
- Election: November 6, 1894

Senate
- Members: 40
- President: William M. Butler
- Party control: Republican (36–4)

House
- Members: 240
- Speaker: George von Lengerke Meyer
- Party control: Republican (194–46)

Sessions
- 1st: January 2, 1895 – June 5, 1895

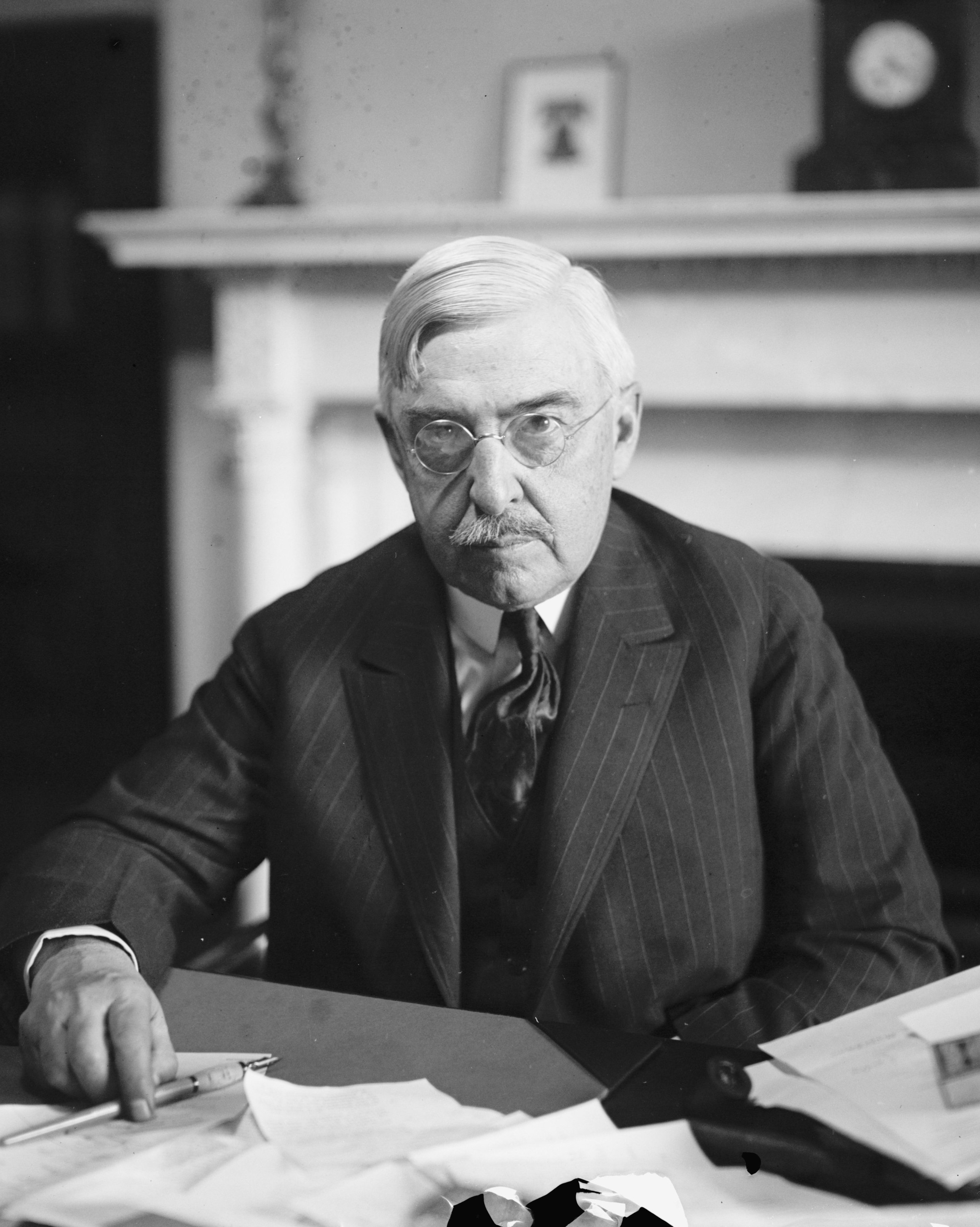
William Butler, Senate president.

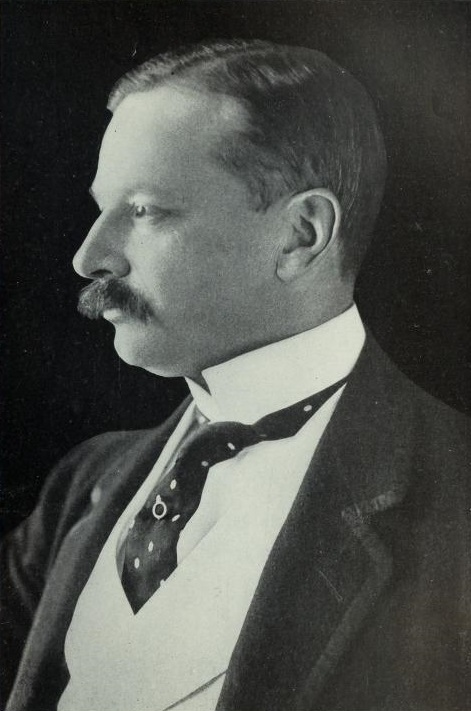
George von Lengerke Meyer, House speaker.

Leaders of the Massachusetts General Court, 1895.

The 116th Massachusetts General Court, consisting of the Massachusetts Senate and the Massachusetts House of Representatives, met in 1895 during the governorship of Frederic T. Greenhalge. William M. Butler served as president of the Senate and George von Lengerke Meyer served as speaker of the House.

Notable legislation included an act related to "the Question of Granting Municipal Suffrage to Women."

== Senators ==
image	name	date of birth	district
	Horace H. Atherton	October 23, 1847	
	Edward B. Atwood	May 13, 1845	
	Eugene A. Bessom	June 11, 1855	
	Ledyard Bill	1836	
	Percival Blodgett	July 18, 1841	
	Edward S. Bradford	December 1, 1842	
	George J. Burns	July 14, 1855	
	William M. Butler	January 29, 1861	
	Joseph J. Corbett	December 24, 1863	
	Francis W. Darling	December 16, 1852	
	William B. Durant	September 29, 1844	
	Ether S. Foss	June 10, 1834	
	Edward G. Frothingham	August 12, 1837	
	Granville Austin Fuller	March 13, 1837	
	George L. Gage	February 6, 1845	
	George A. Galloupe	October 28, 1850	
	Michael B. Gilbride	February 13, 1866	
	Robert S. Gray	September 28, 1847	
	Edwin B. Harvey	April 4, 1834	
	Isaac P. Hutchinson	February 26, 1860	
	George P. Lawrence	May 19, 1859	
	James Cushing Leach	June 11, 1831	
	Joseph B. Maccabe	November 19, 1857	
	Dana Malone	October 8, 1857	
	William Henry McMorrow	March 23, 1871	
	Joel D. Miller	October 10, 1837	
	William A. Morse	July 27, 1863	
	Joseph O. Neill	January 31, 1838	
	George W. Perkins	July 1, 1842	
	John Quinn Jr.	December 16, 1859	
	George A. Reed	September 10, 1842	
	John B. Ripley	July 8, 1849	
	Stephen Salisbury III	March 31, 1835	
	George P. Sanger	September 6, 1852	
	Sylvanus Smith	March 10, 1829	
	Louis C. Southard	April 1, 1854	
	Charles F. Sprague	June 10, 1857	
	Arthur Holbrook Wellman	October 30, 1855	
	Marciene H. Whitcomb	October 24, 1837	

== Representatives ==
image	name	date of birth	district
	Daniel W. Allen	June 17, 1827	
	Romeo E. Allen	October 17, 1852	
	Isaiah P. Atsatt	March 17, 1848	
	Frederick E. Austin	August 6, 1865	
	George W. Bailey	March 20, 1848	
	James Alderson Bailey Jr.	March 25, 1867	
	Theophilus B. Baker	May 16, 1830	
	Charles T. Balch	February 23, 1844	
	Charles Grey Bancroft	December 3, 1866	
	Solon Bancroft	June 22, 1839	
	Harding R. Barber	December 20, 1839	
	Albert F. Barker	October 24, 1859	
	Erwin F. Barnes	March 14, 1846	
	Franklin O. Barnes	November 11, 1841	
	Daniel J. Barry	August 27, 1859	
	John L. Bates	September 18, 1859	
	Algernon T. Beaman	1847	
	Frank S. Bennett	May 12, 1857	
	George B. Bird	February 15, 1867	
	Henry Clay Bliss	May 5, 1846	
	Benjamin F. Blodgett	June 6, 1843	
	Charles P. Bond	July 24, 1855	
	Samuel S. Bourne	December 9, 1850	
	Harvey L. Boutwell	April 5, 1860	
	Fred H. Bradford	July 13, 1850	
	Manassah Edward Bradley	August 15, 1863	
	Charles Donnell Brown	June 5, 1862	
	Frederick A. Brown	October 24, 1856	
	Benjamin S. Bullock	May 12, 1850	
	William H. Burges	November 3, 1835	
	J. Marshall Burt	August 28, 1842	
	T. Preston Burt	July 20, 1844	
	Charles W. Carroll	November 1, 1863	
	William Carter	February 25, 1830	
	Daniel C. Casey	August 10, 1867	
	Frank Chandler	February 20, 1852	
	Luther W. Clark	September 19, 1851	
	James A. Cochran	June 27, 1847	
	Michael W. Collins	August 5, 1868	
	Heman S. Cook	May 13, 1840	
	Gilbert Cooke	August 4, 1841	
	Ellery B. Crane	November 12, 1836	
	James F. Creed	December 4, 1869	
	Frederick W. Dallinger	October 2, 1871	
	William W. Davis	August 8, 1862	
	Thomas M. Denham	February 2, 1840	
	David T. Dickinson	August 13, 1867	
	Thomas Donahue	August 20, 1853	
	Timothy J. Donovan	April 7, 1867	
	William F. Donovan	December 29, 1866	
	William J. Donovan	October 31, 1862	
	Harry R. Dow	February 12, 1862	
	William H. Drew	March 27, 1855	
	Daniel M. Driscoll	January 2, 1861	
	William P. Driscoll	May 1, 1857	
	Levi A. Drury	August 9, 1847	
	Robert Duddy	1847	
	George Morton Eddy	August 5, 1843	
	Henry Edgarton	December 29, 1820	
	Albert H. Edgerton	August 23, 1843	
	Alpheus M. Eldredge	January 25, 1828	
	Benjamin F. Estes	August 28, 1836	
	Thomas F. Fallon	December 7, 1857	
	Clarentine E. Ferson	May 19, 1845	
	Wellington Fillmore	October 18, 1850	
	Henry H. Fisk	June 5, 1843	
	James H. Flint	June 25, 1852	
	Silas W. Flint	September 4, 1843	
	Joseph J. Flynn	May 1, 1862	
	William H. Foote	January 15, 1833	
	William E. Ford	July 20, 1823	
	Otis Foss	October 4, 1838	
	George E. Fowle	July 4, 1837	
	Zenas A. French	September 4, 1843	
	James A. Gallivan	October 22, 1866	
	John J. Gardner	February 23, 1853	
	John Dennis Hammond Gauss	January 4, 1861	
	Henry E. Gaylord	June 5, 1846	
	Michael P. Geary	August 16, 1868	
	Samuel Wesley George	April 26, 1862	
	James Love Gillingham	July 12, 1857	
	Charles W. Goodrich	December 30, 1840	
	William T. Graham	February 1, 1861	
	Alexander Grant	September 26, 1853	
	Joshua S. Gray	August 16, 1840	
	Abner Greenwood	September 10, 1826	
	Thomas Ellwood Grover	February 9, 1846	
	Edward A. Hale	January 11, 1850	
	Charles L. Hammond	September 1, 1860	
	George Hammond	December 14, 1839	
	Franklin P. Harlow		
	Benjamin C. Harvey	September 4, 1847	
	Albert L. Harwood	September 10, 1847	
	Samuel Hastings	February 1, 1837	
	Bowers C. Hathaway	March 18, 1823	
	Frederic W. Hathaway	March 6, 1836	
	Wesley O. Hawkes	July 7, 1842	
	William Henry Irving Hayes	June 21, 1848	
	George A. Hibbard	October 27, 1864	
	Sumner C. Higgins	November 24, 1843	
	Thomas F. Hoban	December 20, 1860	
	Joshua B. Holden	March 5, 1850	
	Timothy Holland	July 12, 1865	
	J. Edward Hollis	1840	
	E. Clarence Holt	January 13, 1850	
	John Gregory Horan	November 28, 1868	
	Louis P. Howe	May 29, 1858	
	Henry D. Humphrey	June 20, 1861	
	Caleb Burroughs Huse	September 13, 1833	
	William H. Hutchinson	March 26, 1834	
	Richard William Irwin	February 18, 1857	
	Dwight H. Ives	January 28, 1837	
	William S. Jenks	December 1, 1855	
	Edward P. Johnson	October 21, 1844	
	George R. Jones	February 8, 1862	
	Cyrus Anson Jordan	April 7, 1859	
	Benjamin Adams Jourdan	July 20, 1832	
	Frank W. Kaan	September 11, 1861	
	James Keenan	March 4, 1850	
	Thomas F. Keenan	March 11, 1854	
	John E. Kellogg	July 2, 1845	
	William G. Kimball	December 25, 1846	
	Francis M. Kingman	May 25, 1837	
	Joseph Brewster Knox	December 12, 1828	
	Franz H. Krebs Jr	1868	
	Amos A. Lawrence	November 3, 1847	
	George A. Leach	February 3, 1848	
	Osgood L. Leach	September 18, 1848	
	Warren S. Leach	February 23, 1847	
	Charles F. Light	August 1, 1860	
	Francis Cabot Lowell	January 7, 1855	
	John M. Lynch	November 26, 1860	
	John A. Macomber, 2d	January 25, 1849	
	Hugo Mann	September 27, 1837	
	William H. Marden	May 30, 1843	
	Samuel N. Mayo	May 24, 1839	
	Jeremiah Justin McCarthy	March 29, 1852	
	Bernard McMackin	April 2, 1869	
	James F. Melaven	November 19, 1858	
	George H. Mellen	October 7, 1850	
	James H. Mellen	November 7, 1845	
	George von Lengerke Meyer	June 24, 1858	
	Charles E. Mills	December 28, 1847	
	Samuel H. Mitchell	November 2, 1854	
	Joseph F. Mooney	May 21, 1866	
	E. Lewis Moore	January 21, 1834	
	William Moran	September 6, 1855	
	Eugene Michael Moriarty	April 15, 1849	
	Mark B. Mulvey	July 9, 1868	
	Timothy F. Murphy	August 9, 1864	
	James J. Myers	November 20, 1842	
	Herbert Newell	April 2, 1855	
	Richard Newell	April 17, 1839	
	George H. Newhall	October 24, 1850	
	John B. Newhall	October 1, 1862	
	Joseph J. Norton	November 19, 1870	
	Michael J. O'Brien	November 9, 1855	
	John J. O'Connor	April 13, 1871	
	John M. O'Hara	July 2, 1865	
	L. Edgar Osgood	February 13, 1865	
	Theodore K. Parker	September 3, 1841	
	George W. Penniman	May 31, 1859	
	Lyman H. Perkins	March 29, 1864	
	Carlton T. Phelps	October 13, 1867	
	Edward W. Pinkham	February 9, 1839	
	Burrill Porter	February 22, 1832	
	George W. Porter	January 30, 1844	
	J. Frank Porter	April 8, 1847	
	John Jacob Prevaux	March 16, 1857	
	George E. Putnam	February 9, 1851	
	Nicolas M. Quint	July 18, 1838	
	Charles I. Quirk	August 15, 1871	
	Henry F. Rice	January 29, 1844	
	Robert A. Richardson	1840	
	Ernest W. Roberts	November 22, 1858	
	Alfred Seelye Roe	June 8, 1844	
	Silas B. Root	July 21, 1850	
	George A. Roper	July 25, 1849	
	Samuel Ross	February 2, 1865	
	Daniel D. Rourke	July 16, 1869	
	Fred H. Rourke	May 23, 1867	
	George G. Russell	November 4, 1845	
	James F. Ryan	January 6, 1864	
	Martin F. Ryder	November 1, 1854	
	Charles F. Sargent	August 31, 1858	
	George Melville Scates	September 30, 1841	
	William P. Searls	June 3, 1851	
	John Timothy Shea	February 14, 1866	
	John F. Sheehan	September 2, 1861	
	William Shepherd	September 17, 1837	
	Frank M. Sibley	October 12, 1854	
	Henry D. Sisson	December 8, 1836	
	David F. Slade	November 5, 1855	
	George T. Sleeper	September 15, 1852	
	Albert C. Smith	March 14, 1845	
	Henry M. Smith	March 12, 1852	
	George F. Snow	June 12, 1841	
	Amasa E. Southworth	May 19, 1844	
	Warren F. Spalding	January 14, 1841	
	John C. Spofford	November 25, 1854	
	Arthur L. Spring	February 25, 1858	
	Thomas E. St. John	March 2, 1831	
	Fred D. Stanley	October 17, 1863	
	Ezra A. Stevens	March 12, 1827	
	Joseph W. Stocker	April 6, 1824	
	Daniel D. Stone	October 23, 1844	
	Homer O. Strong	October 22, 1850	
	Charles F. Sturtevant	March 31, 1848	
	George J. Tarr	February 1, 1832	
	Robert T. Teamoh	1864	
	Josiah P. Thacher	April 8, 1858	
	Lyman D. Thurston	September 8, 1832	
	William Tolman	June 2, 1858	
	Henry Tower	June 24, 1829	
	William W. Towle	August 21, 1860	
	Michael Tuite	June 29, 1853	
	Arthur H. Turner	September 26, 1858	
	George W. Turner	February 24, 1829	
	John E. Tuttle	November 3, 1835	
	Charles Henry Utley	November 27, 1857	
	Frank Lewis Wadden	April 21, 1847	
	J. Gilman Waite	March 20, 1837	
	Charles Elliott Wakefield	December 23, 1854	
	George Albert Wales	March 26, 1858	
	Horace E. Wallis	November 3, 1862	
	Stephen Cady Warriner	August 25, 1839	
	George B. Waterman	July 10, 1862	
	George L. Wentworth	May 24, 1852	
	Clarence P. Weston	August 23, 1845	
	Mark O. Wheaton	November 22, 1833	
	Elbridge J. Whitaker	November 11, 1859	
	George E. White	June 13, 1849	
	William S. White	February 28, 1863	
	Albert L. Wiley	December 14, 1835	
	Edward E. Willard	September 25, 1862	
	Edward H. Wilson	September 26, 1848	
	John Winn	July 3, 1828	
	Henry O. Wood	February 26, 1837	
	John Loring Woodfall	September 15, 1847	
	Charles L. Young	May 23, 1850	

== See also ==
- 54th United States Congress
- List of Massachusetts General Courts
