= 1897 Massachusetts legislature =

118th Massachusetts General Court
←	117th	119th	→

Overview
- Legislative body: General Court
- Election: November 3, 1896

Senate
- Members: 40
- President: George P. Lawrence
- Party control: Republican (35–5)

House
- Members: 240
- Speaker: John L. Bates
- Party control: Republican (202–38)

Sessions
- 1st: January 6, 1897 – June 12, 1897

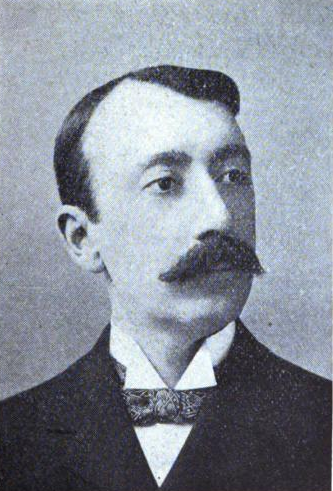
George Lawrence, Senate president.

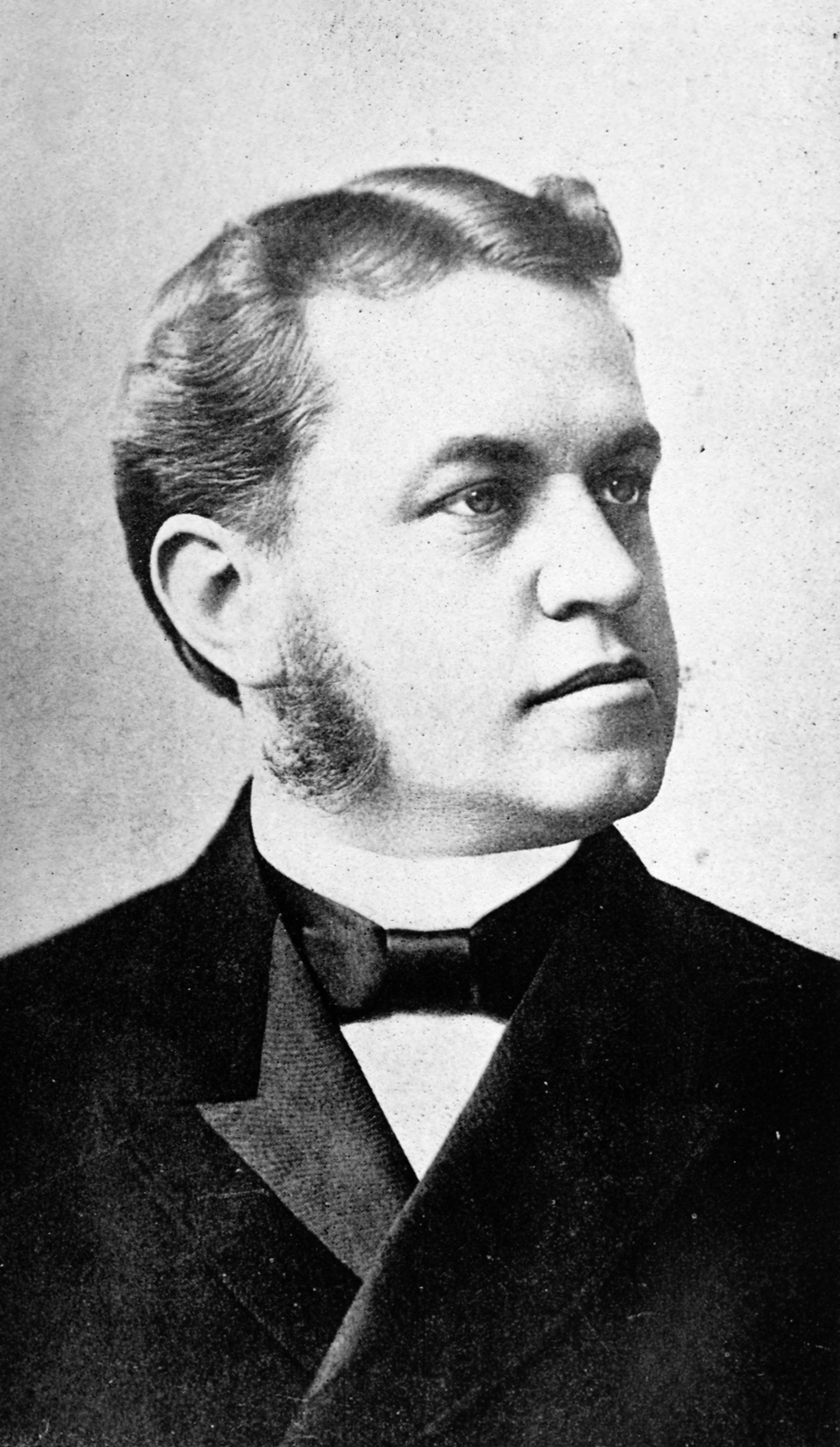
John Bates, House speaker.

Leaders of the Massachusetts General Court, 1897.

The 118th Massachusetts General Court, consisting of the Massachusetts Senate and the Massachusetts House of Representatives, met in 1897 during the governorship of Roger Wolcott. George P. Lawrence served as president of the Senate and John L. Bates served as speaker of the House.

The 1897 legislature is the high-water mark for the Massachusetts Republican Party, which held 35 seats in the Senate and 202 in the House. Republicans have not surpassed either number since, though they would match their high of 35 Senate seats again in 1920.

== Senators ==
image	name	date of birth	district
	James Alderson Bailey Jr.	March 25, 1867	
	Harding R. Barber	December 20, 1839	
	Albert F. Barker	October 24, 1859	
	Lewis H. Bartlett	April 2, 1854	
	William R. Black	August 23, 1830	
	Edward S. Bradford	December 1, 1842	
	William Hartwell Brigham	February 1, 1863	
	William H. Cook	January 7, 1843	
	Ellery B. Crane	November 12, 1836	
	Frederick W. Dallinger	October 2, 1871	
	William W. Davis	August 8, 1862	
	James H. Derbyshire	June 11, 1855	
	Noble W. Everett	February 20, 1827	
	Joseph Byron Farley	October 10, 1847	
	James H. Flint	June 25, 1852	
	Charles E. Folsom	February 24, 1855	
	James A. Gallivan	October 22, 1866	
	John Dennis Hammond Gauss	January 4, 1861	
	Clarke Partridge Harding	June 20, 1853	
	Albert L. Harwood	September 10, 1847	
	James E. Hayes	August 10, 1865	
	Joshua B. Holden	March 5, 1850	
	Richard William Irwin	February 18, 1857	
	Dwight H. Ives	January 28, 1837	
	Erastus Jones	September 11, 1825	
	George P. Lawrence	May 19, 1859	
	Martin Lomasney	December 3, 1859	
	William Moran	September 6, 1855	
	William A. Morse	July 27, 1863	
	Henry Parsons	February 2, 1842	
	John Jacob Prevaux	March 16, 1857	
	George E. Putnam	February 9, 1851	
	John Quinn Jr.	December 16, 1859	
	Ernest W. Roberts	November 22, 1858	
	Alfred Seelye Roe	June 8, 1844	
	George Edwin Smith	April 5, 1849	
	Rufus Albertson Soule	1839	
	William W. Towle	August 21, 1860	
	John Loring Woodfall	September 15, 1847	
	Charles F. Woodward	November 19, 1852	

== Representatives ==
image	name	date of birth	district
	Albert E. Addis	May 4, 1864	
	Benjamin C. Ames	December 20, 1859	
	Richard F. Andrews, Jr	April 13, 1863	
	Julius C. Anthony	September 24, 1856	
	Edward R. Ashley	May 15, 1824	
	Henry C. Attwill	March 11, 1872	
	Gustavus Atwood	November 18, 1843	
	Thomas C. Bachelder	November 6, 1860	
	Charles O. Bailey	January 24, 1863	
	Horace P. Bailey	March 3, 1840	
	John E. Baldwin	June 26, 1869	
	Frank W. Barnard	January 3, 1853	
	Franklin O. Barnes	November 11, 1841	
	George H. Bartlett	September 6, 1857	
	Jonathan B. L. Bartlett	October 11, 1849	
	John L. Bates	September 18, 1859	
	Charles O. Beede	December 29, 1840	
	Henry A. Belcher	August 6, 1845	
	Scott F. Bickford	November 14, 1864	
	Osgood C. Blaney	January 20, 1860	
	John Bleiler	May 9, 1837	
	Henry H. Bosworth	March 16, 1868	
	Harvey L. Boutwell	April 5, 1860	
	Walter L. Bouve	October 28, 1849	
	Henry J. Boyd	May 9, 1831	
	Cary C. Bradford	February 8, 1855	
	Manassah Edward Bradley	August 15, 1863	
	Charles Donnell Brown	June 5, 1862	
	Charles E. Brown	November 18, 1850	
	George A. Brown	November 24, 1854	
	Joseph G. Brown	January 19, 1825	
	Aaron R. Bunting	August 26, 1833	
	Clement F. Burr	January 22, 1849	
	Ernest W. Calkins	December 25, 1855	
	Edward B. Callender	February 23, 1851	
	Andrew Campbell	May 3, 1826	
	Leonard B. Chandler	August 29, 1851	
	William D. Chapple	August 6, 1868	
	George F. Chase	December 11, 1851	
	James B. Clancy	May 26, 1868	
	Albert B. Clark	June 5, 1854	
	Albert Clarke	October 13, 1840	
	Samuel Cole	December 15, 1856	
	James W. Coleman	March 17, 1855	
	Walter S. V. Cooke	August 12, 1851	
	George W. Coombs	November 4, 1837	
	Edward A. Cowee	July 23, 1857	
	Fred E. Crawford	July 7, 1857	
	Charles C. Crocker	August 21, 1831	
	Thomas W. Crocker	December 27, 1832	
	Alfred R. Crosby	August 30, 1838	
	Richard Cullinane	February 2, 1859	
	Nelson P. Cummings	April 27, 1847	
	Daniel J. Curley	April 2, 1841	
	William Curtis	August 8, 1857	
	Daniel W. Davis	October 3, 1846	
	William Ripley Davis	March 8, 1862	
	Cornelius R. Day	December 29, 1847	
	Charles Leroy Dean	May 29, 1844	
	Thomas M. Denham	February 2, 1840	
	Robert F. Denvir	September 8, 1840	
	John B. Dewing	January 28, 1835	
	David T. Dickinson	August 13, 1867	
	Richard Dobbins	June 2, 1845	
	Thomas Donahue	August 20, 1853	
	Jeremiah F. Donovan	May 10, 1856	
	Thomas J. Dooling	January 28, 1868	
	James M. Douglass	February 24, 1839	
	Daniel M. Driscoll	January 2, 1861	
	Hugo A. Dubuque	November 3, 1854	
	A. Glendon Dyar	August 4, 1860	
	Freeman O. Emerson	January 12, 1859	
	A. Edwin Enberg	September 9, 1866	
	Eugene B. Estes	December 7, 1850	
	Frank W. Estey	December 16, 1866	
	George S. Evans	September 12, 1841	
	E. Walter Everett	April 11, 1864	
	Wilson H. Fairbank	April 3, 1836	
	John J. Falvey	May 26, 1864	
	Francis F. Farrar	January 10, 1833	
	John J. Feneno	March 24, 1866	
	George E. Fisher	January 22, 1823	
	E. Knowlton Fogg	October 24, 1837	
	Albert T. Folsom	November 9, 1831	
	Otis Foss	October 4, 1838	
	Frank W. Francis	September 16, 1857	
	George G. Frederick	January 14, 1867	
	George F. Fuller	March 8, 1842	
	Charles W. Gale	October 3, 1846	
	Jefferson C. Gallison	August 8, 1841	
	John J. Gardner	February 23, 1853	
	Samuel Wesley George	April 26, 1862	
	Emery B. Gibbs	October 23, 1862	
	Moses D. Gilman	May 23, 1846	
	Otis M. Gove	May 3, 1851	
	Oliver S. Grant	April 30, 1866	
	James Wilson Grimes	November 21, 1865	
	Almon E. Hall	December 6, 1846	
	Amos E. Hall	July 6, 1838	
	Luther Hall	November 5, 1842	
	Frederick Hammond	February 27, 1847	
	Frederic Hanson	May 2, 1835	
	Edward H. Harding	April 17, 1854	
	Joseph M. Harrington	July 26, 1828	
	Frederic W. Hathaway	March 6, 1836	
	William Henry Irving Hayes	June 21, 1848	
	Albert F. Hayward	January 24, 1840	
	Charles E. Hoag	September 18, 1849	
	Charles E. Hosmer	May 25, 1837	
	Walter F. Howard	September 20, 1855	
	Rufus Howe	September 28, 1837	
	Edward H. Hoyt	July 11, 1849	
	Franklin E. Huntress	April 19, 1866	
	Charles Hiller Innes	August 6, 1870	
	John W. Johnson	June 14, 1856	
	George R. Jones	February 8, 1862	
	Melville D. Jones	September 25, 1842	
	William A. Josselyn	February 8, 1856	
	James Keenan	March 4, 1850	
	Thomas F. Keenan	March 11, 1854	
	John A. Keliher	November 6, 1866	
	John L. Kelly	March 29, 1869	
	George H. Kelton	September 20, 1861	
	Thomas W. Kenefick	September 17, 1855	
	Patrick J. Kennedy	March 20, 1862	
	David T. King	January 19, 1864	
	William A. Lang	May 26, 1836	
	James Lawrence	March 23, 1853	
	James H. Leary	November 28, 1868	
	Ottho William Lewis	July 17, 1853	
	Charles F. Light	August 1, 1860	
	Warren J. Livermore	January 5, 1835	
	Alexander Lockhart	December 22, 1854	
	Francis Cabot Lowell	January 7, 1855	
	Albert W. Lyon	March 1, 1869	
	John E. Magenis	May 5, 1873	
	Jeremiah E. Mahoney	November 8, 1864	
	Forrest C. Manchester	September 11, 1859	
	William H. Marden	May 30, 1843	
	Lyman Mason	April 4, 1838	
	Arthur A. Maxwell	January 24, 1858	
	Will W. Mayhew	January 15, 1857	
	Benjamin W. Mayo	April 17, 1836	
	Jeremiah Justin McCarthy	March 29, 1852	
	George M. McClain	March 9, 1842	
	John E. McClellan	September 5, 1847	
	James S. McKenna	January 11, 1864	
	Levi G. McKnight	April 30, 1843	
	John A. McManus	March 9, 1860	
	George F. Mead	May 22, 1854	
	George W. Mellen	May 11, 1837	
	William H. Mellen	November 9, 1842	
	John M. Merriam	September 20, 1862	
	Charles E. Mills	December 28, 1847	
	Charles P. Mills	August 22, 1853	
	Eugene Michael Moriarty	April 15, 1849	
	William L. Morse	May 1, 1849	
	James J. Myers	November 20, 1842	
	Joseph O. Neill	January 31, 1838	
	Edward B. Nevin	November 10, 1858	
	Thaddeus H. Newcomb	March 15, 1826	
	George H. Norton	May 28, 1863	
	B. Alden Nourse	July 19, 1836	
	Frank J. O'Toole	October 13, 1867	
	William Odlin	April 5, 1865	
	John B. Packard	February 22, 1837	
	Herbert C. Parsons	January 15, 1862	
	Joseph E. Pattee	April 24, 1843	
	Francis C. Perry	June 27, 1853	
	Frank H. Pervere	March 24, 1831	
	Lemuel W. Peters	July 29, 1860	
	Franklin F. Phillips	December 21, 1852	
	Edward L. Pickard	December 25, 1834	
	Edward L. Pierce	March 29, 1829	
	Oliver K. Pierce	January 27, 1835	
	John H. Ponce	November 1, 1857	
	Burrill Porter	February 22, 1832	
	William H. Porter	May 8, 1856	
	Thomas Post	August 16, 1834	
	John A. Powers	September 15, 1853	
	David G. Pratt	November 7, 1848	
	Nicolas M. Quint	July 18, 1838	
	Charles I. Quirk	August 15, 1871	
	James P. Ramsay	April 30, 1861	
	Silas Dean Reed	June 25, 1872	
	William Louis Reed	April 5, 1866	
	Michael J. Reidy	August 8, 1870	
	George M. Rice	October 20, 1843	
	Clinton Q. Richmond	December 17, 1859	
	Atherton W. Rogers	August 10, 1848	
	Samuel Ross	February 2, 1865	
	Daniel D. Rourke	July 16, 1869	
	Edward T. Rowell	1836	
	Michael L. Russell	December 15, 1860	
	Howard K. Sanderson	July 10, 1865	
	Frank P. Sargent	November 4, 1854	
	Tristram T. Savory	September 19, 1834	
	William H. Severance	January 12, 1857	
	Charles S. Shattuck	June 5, 1840	
	David B. Shaw	August 20, 1870	
	John F. Sheehan	September 2, 1861	
	P. Howard Shirley	August 15, 1857	
	William E. Skillings	October 23, 1843	
	George B. Smart	February 25, 1835	
	Harvey C. Smith	November 20, 1847	
	Henry R. Smith	October 7, 1842	
	Mark E. Smith	June 22, 1871	
	Cyrus Spaulding	April 17, 1835	
	Hugh L. Stalker	December 31, 1857	
	Fred D. Stanley	October 17, 1863	
	Edward A. Stevens	December 9, 1841	
	John M. Stevenson	August 31, 1846	
	Joseph I. Stewart	April 25, 1847	
	Joseph W. Stocker	April 6, 1824	
	Willmore B. Stone	June 24, 1853	
	Cornelius F. Sullivan	June 15, 1865	
	Simon S. Sullivan	August 5, 1868	
	Peter Francis Tague	June 4, 1871	
	James Thompson	May 18, 1848	
	Henry Thrasher	May 29, 1837	
	Charles W. Tilton	April 6, 1836	
	John J. Toomey	September 18, 1868	
	Charles E. Trow	April 18, 1833	
	J. Gilman Waite	March 20, 1837	
	Charles G. Washburn	January 28, 1857	
	Eben C. Waterman	March 1, 1840	
	Otis V. Waterman	August 13, 1834	
	William W. Waterman	December 4, 1831	
	Jackson Webster	March 14, 1849	
	George W. Whidden	June 15, 1858	
	Horace C. White	January 26, 1836	
	Zadoc L. White	December 29, 1854	
	James Whitehead	December 20, 1857	
	William A. Whittlesey	February 21, 1849	
	Francis O. Winslow	March 20, 1844	
	Alva S. Wood	May 12, 1828	
	John A. Woodbury	August 22, 1836	
	Daniel S. Woodman	April 12, 1842	
	Joseph W. Woodman	January 25, 1847	
	Willie C. Young	May 28, 1848	

== See also ==
- 55th United States Congress
- List of Massachusetts General Courts
