= 1896 Massachusetts legislature =

117th Massachusetts General Court
←	116th	118th	→

Overview
- Legislative body: General Court
- Election: November 5, 1895

Senate
- Members: 40
- President: George P. Lawrence
- Party control: Republican (33–7)

House
- Members: 240
- Speaker: George von Lengerke Meyer
- Party control: Republican (182–58)

Sessions
- 1st: January 1, 1896 – June 10, 1896

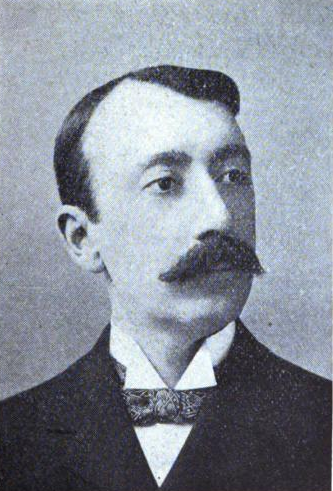
George P. Lawrence, Senate president.

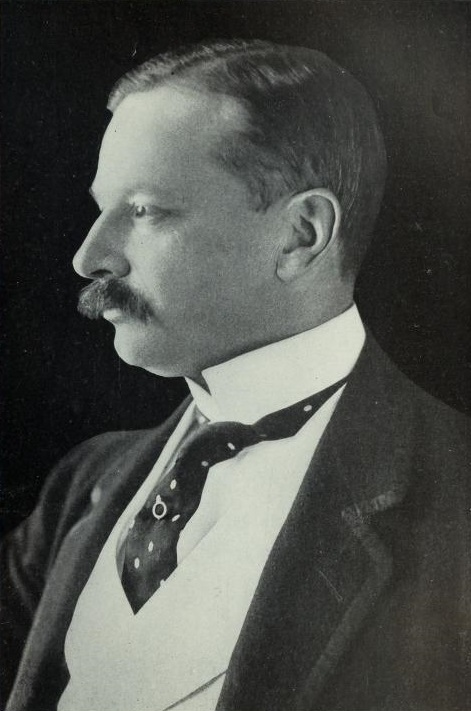
George von Lengerke Meyer, House speaker.

Leaders of the Massachusetts General Court, 1896.

The 117th Massachusetts General Court, consisting of the Massachusetts Senate and the Massachusetts House of Representatives, met in 1896 during the governorship of Roger Wolcott. George P. Lawrence served as president of the Senate and George von Lengerke Meyer served as speaker of the House.

Notable legislation included "An Act to Provide for the Security and Preservation of the So-called Bulfinch Portion of the State House."

== Senators ==
image	name	date of birth	district
	Horace H. Atherton	October 23, 1847	
	Albert F. Barker	October 24, 1859	
	Lewis H. Bartlett	April 2, 1854	
	Percival Blodgett	July 18, 1841	
	Edward S. Bradford	December 1, 1842	
	George J. Burns	July 14, 1855	
	William A. Chase	May 31, 1845	
	William H. Cook	January 7, 1843	
	Joseph J. Corbett	December 24, 1863	
	Frederick W. Dallinger	October 2, 1871	
	Francis W. Darling	December 16, 1852	
	James H. Derbyshire	June 11, 1855	
	Noble W. Everett	February 20, 1827	
	George A. Galloupe	October 28, 1850	
	Clarke Partridge Harding	June 20, 1853	
	Isaac P. Hutchinson	February 26, 1860	
	Richard William Irwin	February 18, 1857	
	Erastus Jones	September 11, 1825	
	George P. Lawrence	May 19, 1859	
	Martin Lomasney	December 3, 1859	
	Joseph B. Maccabe	November 19, 1857	
	Dana Malone	October 8, 1857	
	William Henry McMorrow	March 23, 1871	
	Joel D. Miller	October 10, 1837	
	William A. Morse	July 27, 1863	
	Joseph O. Neill	January 31, 1838	
	James P. Niles	September 30, 1849	
	Fisher H. Pearson	November 29, 1866	
	George W. Perkins	July 1, 1842	
	John Jacob Prevaux	March 16, 1857	
	John Quinn Jr.	December 16, 1859	
	George A. Reed	September 10, 1842	
	Alfred Seelye Roe	June 8, 1844	
	George P. Sanger	September 6, 1852	
	Rufus Albertson Soule	1839	
	Louis C. Southard	April 1, 1854	
	Charles F. Sprague	June 10, 1857	
	Richard Sullivan	February 24, 1856	
	Arthur Holbrook Wellman	October 30, 1855	
	John Loring Woodfall	September 15, 1847	

== Representatives ==
image	name	date of birth	district
	Walter Adams	May 15, 1848	
	Albert E. Addis	May 4, 1864	
	Daniel W. Allen	June 17, 1827	
	S. Augustus Allen	February 14, 1855	
	Frederick Atherton	May 8, 1865	
	Henry C. Attwill	March 11, 1872	
	Waldo E. Austin	August 31, 1839	
	Charles O. Bailey	January 24, 1863	
	George W. Bailey	March 20, 1848	
	Horace P. Bailey	March 3, 1840	
	Theophilus B. Baker	May 16, 1830	
	Solon Bancroft	June 22, 1839	
	Harding R. Barber	December 20, 1839	
	Franklin O. Barnes	November 11, 1841	
	Daniel J. Barry	August 27, 1859	
	Myron S. Barton	December 24, 1837	
	John L. Bates	September 18, 1859	
	Horace S. Bean	September 17, 1867	
	William Beggs	August 7, 1844	
	Charles E. Bennett	May 8, 1861	
	George B. Bird	February 15, 1867	
	Avander N. Blood	September 4, 1839	
	Charles P. Bond	July 24, 1855	
	Samuel S. Bourne	December 9, 1850	
	Harvey L. Boutwell	April 5, 1860	
	Walter L. Bouve	October 28, 1849	
	Henry J. Boyd	May 9, 1831	
	Manassah Edward Bradley	August 15, 1863	
	J. Dwight Brady	December 15, 1859	
	Charles Donnell Brown	June 5, 1862	
	Daniel Brown	December 26, 1842	
	George A. Brown	November 24, 1854	
	Joseph G. Brown	January 19, 1825	
	Aaron R. Bunting	August 26, 1833	
	T. Preston Burt	July 20, 1844	
	A. Webster Butler	August 22, 1858	
	Ernest W. Calkins	December 25, 1855	
	Patrick J. Carroll	May 11, 1865	
	Daniel C. Casey	August 10, 1867	
	Frank Chandler	February 20, 1852	
	George F. Chase	December 11, 1851	
	Albert Clarke	October 13, 1840	
	Arthur L. Coburn	June 18, 1860	
	James A. Cochran	June 27, 1847	
	George F. Coleman	April 10, 1863	
	James W. Coleman	March 17, 1855	
	Walter S. V. Cooke	August 12, 1851	
	Edward A. Cowee	July 23, 1857	
	Ellery B. Crane	November 12, 1836	
	James F. Creed	December 4, 1869	
	Charles C. Crocker	August 21, 1831	
	Harvey Crocker	September 11, 1847	
	Edward S. Crockett	July 22, 1869	
	Nelson P. Cummings	April 27, 1847	
	Daniel J. Curley	April 2, 1841	
	Nathan R. Davis	August 18, 1828	
	William W. Davis	August 8, 1862	
	Cornelius R. Day	December 29, 1847	
	Thomas M. Denham	February 2, 1840	
	Robert F. Denvir	September 8, 1840	
	David T. Dickinson	August 13, 1867	
	Thomas Donahue	August 20, 1853	
	Jeremiah F. Donovan	May 10, 1856	
	Timothy J. Donovan	April 7, 1867	
	James M. Douglass	February 24, 1839	
	Harry R. Dow	February 12, 1862	
	Charles H. Dowse	September 12, 1853	
	Daniel M. Driscoll	January 2, 1861	
	James Driscoll	August 14, 1856	
	William P. Driscoll	May 1, 1857	
	Levi A. Drury	August 9, 1847	
	George N. Dyer	December 17, 1850	
	Benjamin F. Estes	August 28, 1836	
	George S. Evans	September 12, 1841	
	Wilson H. Fairbank	April 3, 1836	
	Daniel B. Fenn	May 31, 1836	
	Wellington Fillmore	October 18, 1850	
	James H. Flint	June 25, 1852	
	Silas W. Flint	September 4, 1843	
	Joseph J. Flynn	May 1, 1862	
	E. Knowlton Fogg	October 24, 1837	
	John Malcolm Forbes	1847	
	William E. Ford	July 20, 1823	
	Otis Foss	October 4, 1838	
	Frank W. Francis	September 16, 1857	
	George F. Fuller	March 8, 1842	
	Jefferson C. Gallison	August 8, 1841	
	James A. Gallivan	October 22, 1866	
	John J. Gardner	February 23, 1853	
	John Dennis Hammond Gauss	January 4, 1861	
	Samuel Wesley George	April 26, 1862	
	Charles A. Grant	October 15, 1848	
	Joshua S. Gray	August 16, 1840	
	William Halliday	June 13, 1853	
	Lloyd F. Hammond	March 1, 1860	
	Frederic Hanson	May 2, 1835	
	Edward H. Harding	April 17, 1854	
	Benjamin C. Harvey	September 4, 1847	
	Albert L. Harwood	September 10, 1847	
	William R. Hayden	May 7, 1820	
	William Henry Irving Hayes	June 21, 1848	
	Thomas F. Hoban	December 20, 1860	
	Joshua B. Holden	March 5, 1850	
	J. Edward Hollis	1840	
	E. Clarence Holt	January 13, 1850	
	Seba A. Holton	August 30, 1847	
	Charles E. Hosmer	May 25, 1837	
	Walter F. Howard	September 20, 1855	
	Roger S. Howe	November 20, 1849	
	Henry D. Humphrey	June 20, 1861	
	Caleb Burroughs Huse	September 13, 1833	
	John W. Johnson	June 14, 1856	
	George R. Jones	February 8, 1862	
	Frank W. Kaan	September 11, 1861	
	George H. Kearn	January 6, 1839	
	James Keenan	March 4, 1850	
	Thomas F. Keenan	March 11, 1854	
	John A. Keliher	November 6, 1866	
	George H. Kelton	September 20, 1861	
	Thomas W. Kenefick	September 17, 1855	
	Patrick J. Kennedy	March 20, 1862	
	Charles W. King	September 8, 1861	
	David T. King	January 19, 1864	
	Francis M. Kingman	May 25, 1837	
	Franz H. Krebs, Jr	1868	
	James H. Leary	November 28, 1868	
	Michael J. Leary	November 16, 1869	
	Charles F. Light	August 1, 1860	
	Warren J. Livermore	January 5, 1835	
	Walter E. Lord	January 22, 1856	
	Francis Cabot Lowell	January 7, 1855	
	Jeremiah E. Mahoney	November 8, 1864	
	Forrest C. Manchester	September 11, 1859	
	William H. Marden	May 30, 1843	
	Arthur A. Maxwell	January 24, 1858	
	Will W. Mayhew	January 15, 1857	
	Benjamin W. Mayo	April 17, 1836	
	Samuel N. Mayo	May 24, 1839	
	Jeremiah Justin McCarthy	March 29, 1852	
	George M. McClain	March 9, 1842	
	John E. McClellan	September 5, 1847	
	James S. McKenna	January 11, 1864	
	James F. Melaven	November 19, 1858	
	George H. Mellen	October 7, 1850	
	James H. Mellen	November 7, 1845	
	George von Lengerke Meyer	June 24, 1858	
	Charles E. Mills	December 28, 1847	
	Samuel H. Mitchell	November 2, 1854	
	Charles D. Monroe	January 15, 1856	
	Eugene Michael Moriarty	April 15, 1849	
	James J. Myers	November 20, 1842	
	Thaddeus H. Newcomb	March 15, 1826	
	Henry C. Newell	March 9, 1843	
	Luther Nickerson	July 9, 1829	
	Edward O. Northway	December 12, 1867	
	Joseph J. Norton	November 19, 1870	
	John J. O'Connor	April 13, 1871	
	John M. O'Hara	July 2, 1865	
	Frank J. O'Toole	October 13, 1867	
	John B. Packard	February 22, 1837	
	Clarence H. Parker	October 31, 1849	
	Herbert C. Parsons	January 15, 1862	
	Frank A. Patch	July 23, 1844	
	John H. Ponce	November 1, 1857	
	Burrill Porter	February 22, 1832	
	George W. Porter	January 30, 1844	
	George E. Putnam	February 9, 1851	
	Nicolas M. Quint	July 18, 1838	
	Charles I. Quirk	August 15, 1871	
	Charles W. Ray	August 16, 1847	
	William Louis Reed	April 5, 1866	
	Michael J. Reidy	August 8, 1870	
	George M. Rice	October 20, 1843	
	Clinton Q. Richmond	December 17, 1859	
	Francis R. Richmond	April 20, 1851	
	Thomas Riley	December 22, 1843	
	Ernest W. Roberts	November 22, 1858	
	J. Henry Robinson	February 9, 1831	
	Atherton W. Rogers	August 10, 1848	
	George A. Roper	July 25, 1849	
	Samuel Ross	February 2, 1865	
	Daniel D. Rourke	July 16, 1869	
	Fred H. Rourke	May 23, 1867	
	George G. Russell	November 4, 1845	
	Howard K. Sanderson	July 10, 1865	
	Charles F. Sargent	August 31, 1858	
	Tristram T. Savory	September 19, 1834	
	William P. Searls	June 3, 1851	
	Chester Wells Severence	February 27, 1831	
	Charles S. Shattuck	June 5, 1840	
	David B. Shaw	August 20, 1870	
	John F. Sheehan	September 2, 1861	
	William Shepherd	September 17, 1837	
	P. Howard Shirley	August 15, 1857	
	David F. Slade	November 5, 1855	
	John O. Slocum	March 13, 1842	
	Albert C. Smith	March 14, 1845	
	Charles W. Smith	March 6, 1846	
	Henry R. Smith	October 7, 1842	
	Amasa E. Southworth	May 19, 1844	
	Cyrus Spaulding	April 17, 1835	
	Albert T. Sprague	June 18, 1843	
	Thomas E. St. John	March 2, 1831	
	Fred D. Stanley	October 17, 1863	
	Arlin V. Stevens	June 15, 1854	
	Edward A. Stevens	December 9, 1841	
	Elmer A. Stevens	January 15, 1862	
	Ezra A. Stevens	March 12, 1827	
	Joseph W. Stocker	April 6, 1824	
	Willmore B. Stone	June 24, 1853	
	George D. Storrs	September 19, 1866	
	Arthur D. Story	October 11, 1854	
	Cornelius F. Sullivan	June 15, 1865	
	George J. Tarr	February 1, 1832	
	James Thompson	May 18, 1848	
	Henry Thrasher	May 29, 1837	
	John Rogers Thurston	September 4, 1831	
	Charles W. Tilton	April 6, 1836	
	William Tolman	June 2, 1858	
	Frank M. Trafton	January 4, 1858	
	John E. Tuttle	November 3, 1835	
	Charles Henry Utley	November 27, 1857	
	Henry M. Van Deusen	September 29, 1850	
	Henry R. Van Rensselaer	December 12, 1855	
	George Albert Wales	March 26, 1858	
	William W. Waterman	December 4, 1831	
	Jackson Webster	March 14, 1849	
	Clarence P. Weston	August 23, 1845	
	George W. Weymouth	August 25, 1850	
	Mark O. Wheaton	November 22, 1833	
	George L. Whitcomb	March 18, 1855	
	Edward E. Willard	September 25, 1862	
	Edward H. Wilson	September 26, 1848	
	George G. Withington	July 31, 1831	
	John A. Woodbury	August 22, 1836	
	Joseph W. Woodman	January 25, 1847	
	Charles L. Young	May 23, 1850	
	Willie C. Young	May 28, 1848	

== See also ==
- 54th United States Congress
- List of Massachusetts General Courts
