= John Jacob Prevaux =

American politician (1857–?)

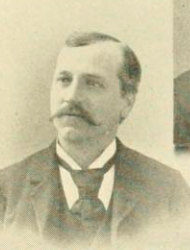

John Jacob Prevaux (March 16, 1857–?) was a builder of carriage bodies and a state legislator in Massachusetts. He was a Republican.

He was born in Oakland, California. He served in the military as a first lieutenant.

He served in the Massachusetts House of Representatives and Massachusetts Senate.

== See also ==
- 1889 Massachusetts legislature
- 1893 Massachusetts legislature
- 1894 Massachusetts legislature
- 1895 Massachusetts legislature
- 1889 Massachusetts legislature
- 1889 Massachusetts legislature
- 1896 Massachusetts legislature
- 1897 Massachusetts legislature
