= John T. Adams =

American businessman and politician (1862–1939)

John Adams
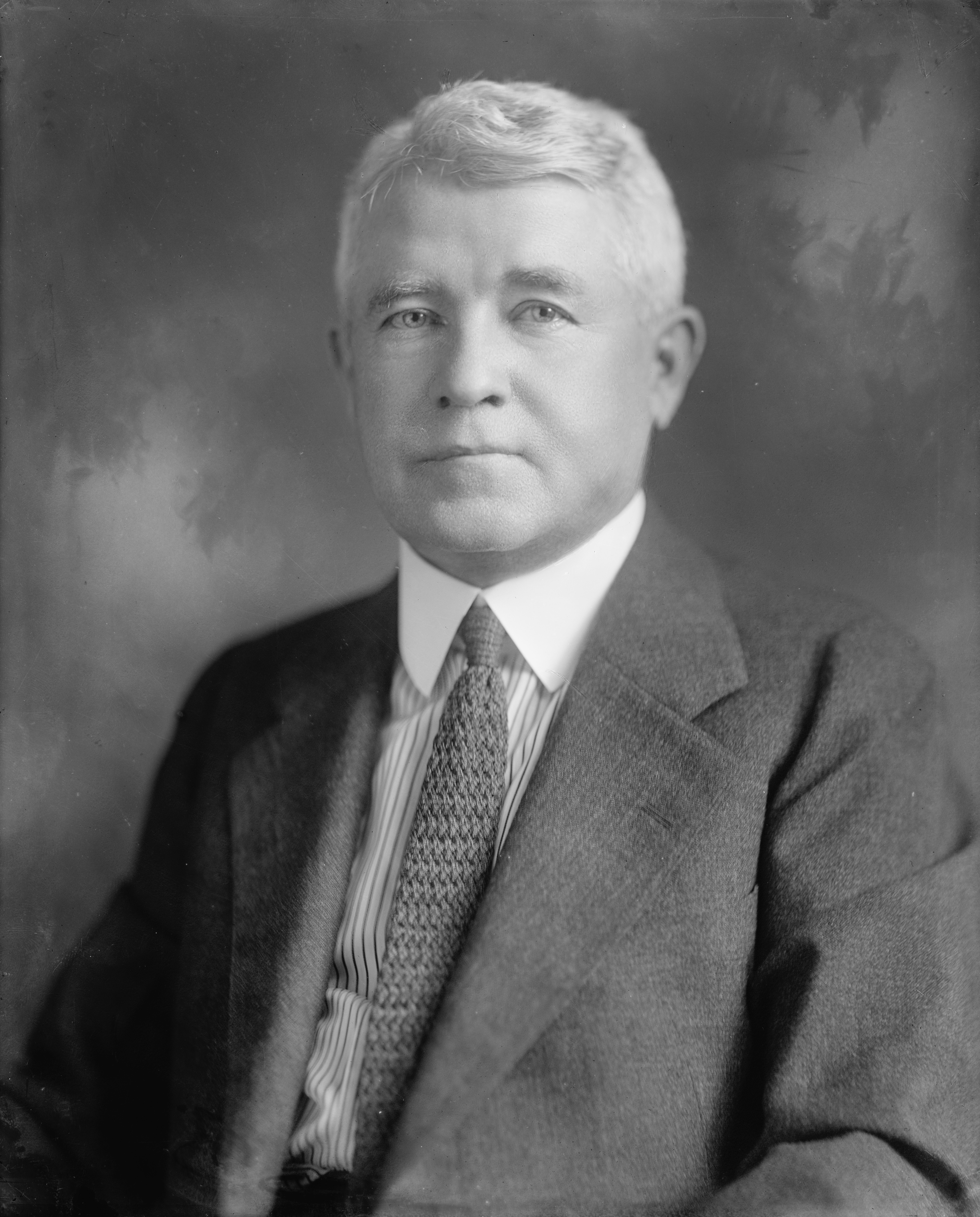

Chair of the Republican National Committee
- In office June 8, 1921 – May 2, 1924
- Preceded by: Will H. Hays
- Succeeded by: William M. Butler

Personal details
- Born: John Taylor Adams; December 22, 1862; Dubuque, Iowa, U.S.
- Died: October 28, 1939 (aged 76); Dubuque, Iowa, U.S.
- Political party: Republican

John Taylor Adams (December 22, 1862 – October 28, 1939) was a businessman in the Dubuque, Iowa area and also a former chairman of the Republican National Committee from 1921 to 1924.

== Biography ==
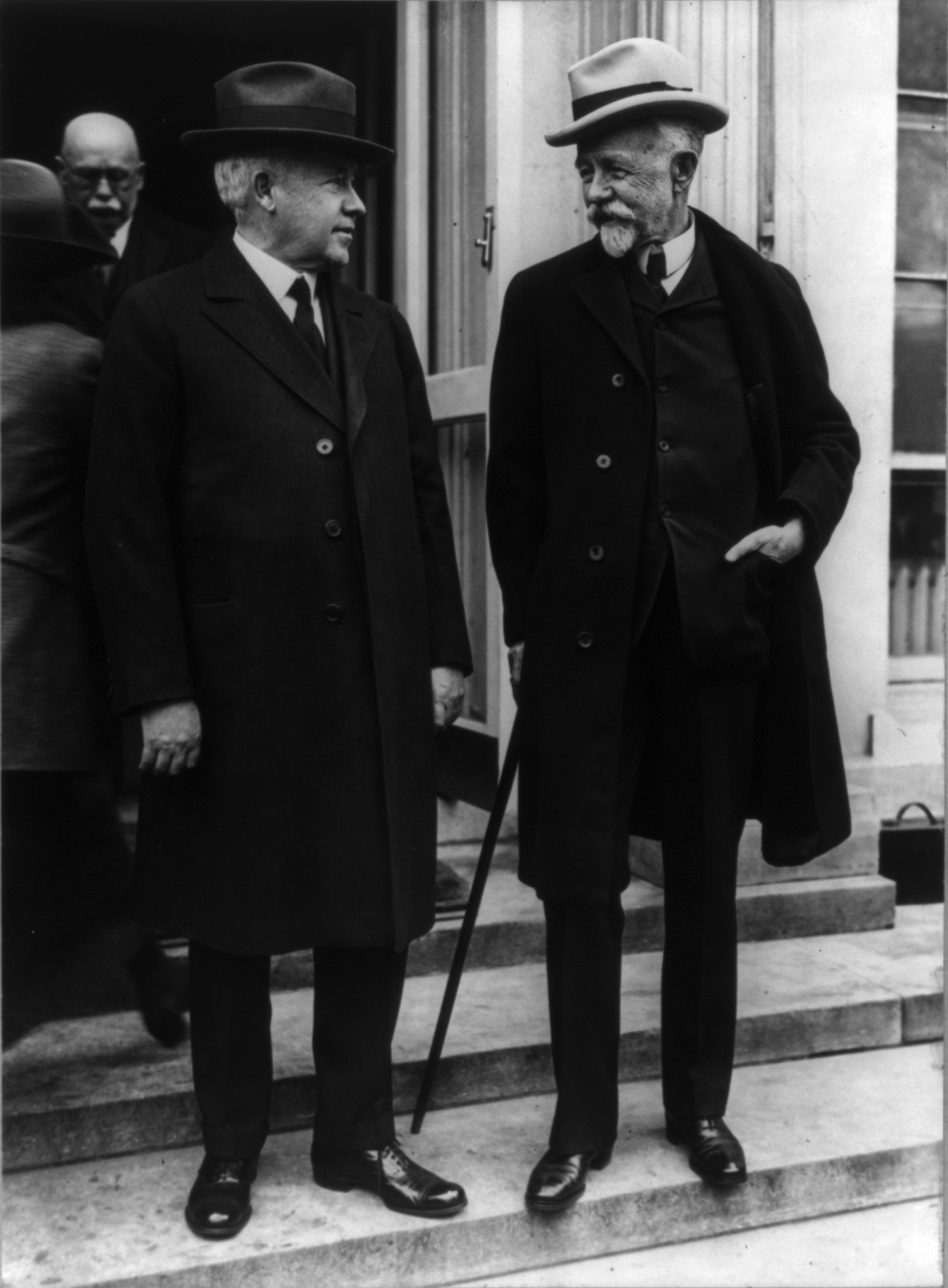
Adams (left) with Senator Henry Cabot Lodge, April 1924

Adams was born on December 22, 1862, in Dubuque to Shubael Pratt and Diancy Taylor Adams. He was educated in the public schools of Dubuque.

As a youth, he began his career in 1881 as an office boy for the firm of Carr, Ryder, and Wheeler Company, which was the predecessor of Carr, Adams, and Collier Company of which he later became president. In 1883 he left Dubuque for a business venture in Bismarck, North Dakota. He remained in Bismarck for about a year and then he returned to Dubuque. After his return he became again associated with Carr, Ryder, and Wheeler Company. He rose very rapidly within the company and in 1895 he became president of Carr, Ryder, and Adams.

During the last few years of the 19th century, Mr. Adams was one of few in the woodworking industry who realized that forests in northern Wisconsin were about depleted and that new sources of raw materials needed to be found. He developed a relationship with a California company (West Side Lumber and Flume Company, of which he would become general manager) and also established one of the first cutting mills on the West Coast.

Adams was also heavily involved in the political world as well. He was considered "one of the greatest political strategists of his generation" according to his obituary. He first came to prominence when he was brought in to manage the last political campaign for Senator William B. Allison. His success soon brought him to the attention of national leaders of the Republican Party. In 1912, he helped President William Howard Taft win Iowa over Theodore Roosevelt. Mr. Adams was the Iowa member of the Republican National Committee for many years before his election to the chairmanship in 1921. He helped direct the campaigns of both Warren G. Harding and of his good friend Calvin Coolidge. He served as Republican National Chairman from 1921 to 1924.

After his retirement as Chairman, he continued to serve as President of Carr, Ryder, and Adams Company in Dubuque until his death on October 28, 1939. He was buried in Linwood Cemetery in Dubuque, Iowa.

Party political offices
Preceded by Will H. Hays	Chair of the Republican National Committee; 1921–1924	Succeeded by William M. Butler
