= William M. Butler =

American politician (1861–1937)

William Butler
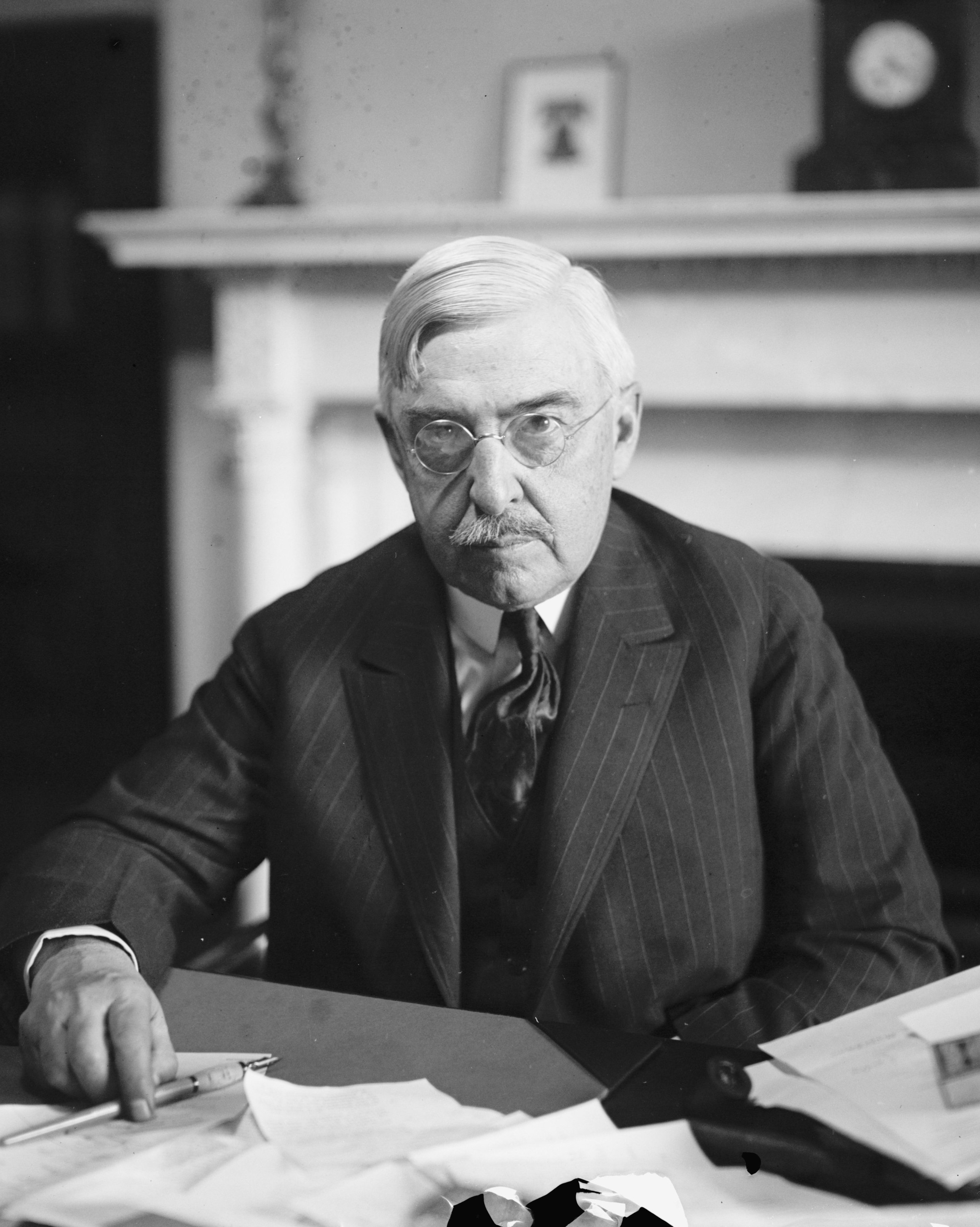
- Butler in 1924

United States Senator from Massachusetts
- In office November 13, 1924 – December 6, 1926
- Appointed by: Channing Cox
- Preceded by: Henry Cabot Lodge
- Succeeded by: David I. Walsh

Chair of the Republican National Committee
- In office May 2, 1924 – July 24, 1928
- Preceded by: John T. Adams
- Succeeded by: Hubert Work

President of the Massachusetts Senate
- In office 1894–1895
- Preceded by: Alfred Pinkerton
- Succeeded by: George P. Lawrence

Personal details
- Born: William Morgan Butler; January 29, 1861 New Bedford, Massachusetts, U.S.
- Died: March 29, 1937 (aged 76) Boston, Massachusetts, U.S.
- Party: Republican
- Education: Boston University (LLB)

William Morgan Butler (January 29, 1861 – March 29, 1937) was an American lawyer and legislator for the State of Massachusetts, and a United States senator.

== Biography ==
Butler was born in New Bedford, Massachusetts, where he attended the public school and studied law. He was admitted to the State bar in 1883. After graduating from the law department of Boston University in 1884, he practiced law in New Bedford until 1895. He was a member of the Massachusetts House of Representatives from 1890 to 1891, and a member of the Massachusetts Senate from 1892 to 1895, serving as its President in 1894 and 1895.

Butler moved to Boston in 1895, and continued the practice of law until 1912, when he engaged in the manufacture of cotton goods. He was a member of the commission to revise the statutes of Massachusetts from 1896 to 1900, and was chairman of the Republican National Committee from 1924 to 1928.

On November 13, 1924, Butler was appointed as a Republican to the United States Senate to fill the vacancy caused by the death of Henry Cabot Lodge, and served from November 13, 1924, to December 6, 1926, when a successor was elected. His bid for election to fill the vacancy was unsuccessful.

Butler served as chairman of the Committee on Patents in the 69th Congress, and then resumed his manufacturing interests. He thereafter resided in Boston. In 1932, Butler sought to return to the Republican National Committee, but was defeated by John Richardson by a vote of 18 to 15. Butler died on March 29, 1937, and was interred in Forest Hills Cemetery.

== See also ==
- 115th Massachusetts General Court (1894)
- 116th Massachusetts General Court (1895)

== Sources ==
- United States Congress. "William M. Butler (id: B001196)". Biographical Directory of the United States Congress.

Political offices
Preceded by Alfred Pinkerton	President of the Massachusetts Senate; 1894–1895	Succeeded by George P. Lawrence
Party political offices
Preceded by John T. Adams	Chair of the Republican National Committee; 1924–1928	Succeeded by Hubert Work
Preceded by Henry Cabot Lodge	Republican nominee for U.S. Senator from Massachusetts (Class 1); 1926	Succeeded by Benjamin Young
Preceded by Frederick H. Gillett	Republican nominee for U.S. Senator from Massachusetts (Class 2); 1930	Succeeded by Henry Cabot Lodge Jr.
U.S. Senate
Preceded by Henry Cabot Lodge	U.S. Senator (Class 1) from Massachusetts; 1924–1926; Served alongside: David I. Walsh	Succeeded by David I. Walsh
Preceded by Richard P. Ernst	Chair of the Senate Patents Committee; 1924–1926	Succeeded by Richard P. Ernst
