= William L. Reed (politician) =

American politician

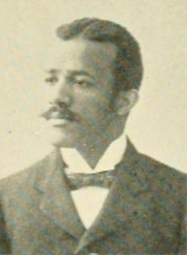

Massachusetts House of Representatives
- In office 1896–1897
- Preceded by: Robert Teamoh

Personal details
- Born: William Louis Reed; April 5, 1866 Danville, Virginia, U.S.
- Died: February 5, 1943 (aged 76) Roxbury, Boston, Massachusetts U.S.
- Party: Republican
- Spouse(s): Caroline Washington (m. 1903; her death), Harriet Frances Edward (m. 1929)
- Education: Stoneham High School; Bryant & Stratton College

William Louis Reed (April 5, 1866 – February 5, 1943) was an American politician and lawyer. In 1896, Reed served in the Massachusetts House of Representatives, succeeded Robert Teamoh. Reed was a Republican, representing parts of Boston.

== Life and career ==
William Louis Reed was born April 5, 1866, in Danville, Virginia. He attended Stoneham High School, and Bryant & Stratton College.

Orphaned at an early age, Reed and his sister Fannie (d. 1923), were brought to Stoneham by his aunt, Lucy Taylor, who raised them. He left high school at 14, after Taylor's death forced him to support himself. He later attended class at Bryant & Stratton while working nights in a shoe factory. He opened a cigar and news shop on Cambridge St. in Boston in 1887. After his election, he later served as executive secretary of the governor's council for 19 years. He was admitted to the Massachusetts bar in 1911, and Lincoln University of Pennsylvania awarded him an honorary MA degree in 1933.

Married first, Caroline Washington, in 1903. After her death in 1929, he married, second, Harriet Frances Edward, who survived him.

== See also ==
- 1896 Massachusetts legislature
- 1897 Massachusetts legislature
