= Salem Observer =

1823–1919 newspaper in Massachusetts, US

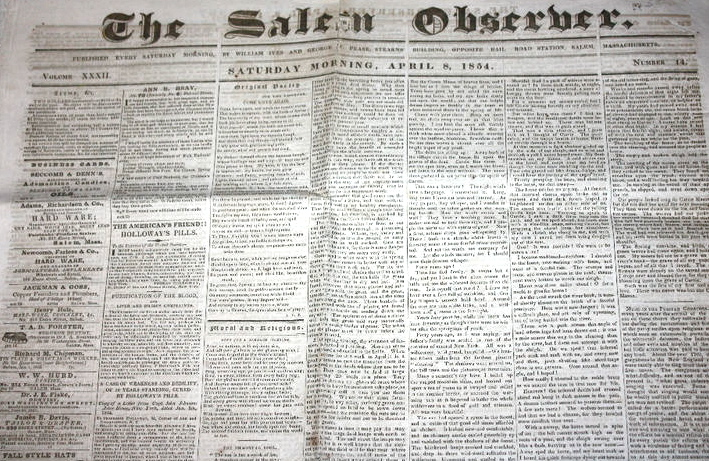
Salem Observer, 1854

The Salem Observer (1823–1919) was a weekly newspaper published in Salem, Massachusetts. Among the editors: J. D. H. Gauss, Benj. Lynde Oliver, Gilbert L. Streeter, Joseph Gilbert Waters. Contributors included Wilson Flagg, Stephen B. Ives Jr., Edwin Jocelyn, E.M. Stone, Solomon S. Whipple. Publishers included Francis A. Fielden, Stephen B. Ives, William Ives, George W. Pease, Horace S. Traill. In the 1880s Elmira S. Cleaveland and Hattie E. Dennis worked as compositors. Its office was located in "'Messrs P. & A. Chase's ... brick building in Washington Street'" (1826–1832) and the Stearns Building (1832–1882). "In 1882 the proprietors erected the Observer Building, of three stories, of brick, in Kinsman Place next to the City Hall." As of the 1870s, one critic noted that although "the Observer is supposed to be neutral in politics, ... it has always shown unmistakable signs of a strong republican tendency."

== Variant titles ==
- The Observer, 1823-1823
- Salem Observer, 1824–1825, 1828-1896
- Salem Literary & Commercial Observer, 1825-1827
- Saturday Evening Observer, 1896-1919
