= Ashley B. Wright =

American politician

Ashley Bascom Wright
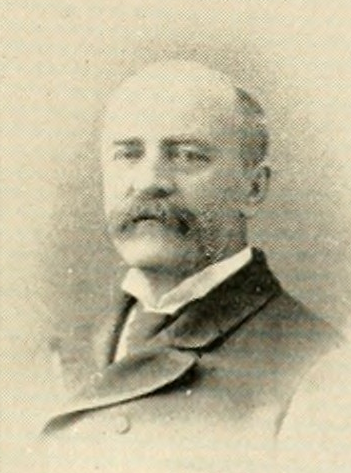

Member of the U.S. House of Representatives from Massachusetts's 1st district
- In office March 4, 1893 – August 14, 1897
- Preceded by: Charles S. Randall
- Succeeded by: George P. Lawrence

Personal details
- Born: May 25, 1841 Hinsdale, Massachusetts, U.S.
- Died: August 14, 1897 (aged 56) North Adams, Massachusetts, U.S.
- Party: Republican

Ashley Bascom Wright (May 25, 1841 – August 14, 1897) was an American politician. He was the chairman of the United States House Committee on Mileage in the fifty-fourth and fifty-fifth congresses.

== Early life and education ==
Wright was born in Hinsdale, Massachusetts on May 25, 1841. He attended public schools and Lincoln Academy in Hinsdale.

== Career ==
Wright moved to North Adams, Massachusetts, in 1861. In that year, he was appointed chief deputy collector of internal revenue for the tenth district of Massachusetts in 1861. He resigned from that position in 1865 to engage in mercantile pursuits.

Wright served as a selectman and commissioner for Berkshire County from 1884 to 1887 and acted as chairman for one year. He was a member of the State executive council in 1890 and 1891 before being elected as a Republican to the fifty-third, fifty-fourth and fifty-fifth congresses, serving from March 4, 1893, until his death.

== Personal life ==
Wright died in North Adams, Berkshire County, August 14, 1897. Wright is interred in the Hinsdale Cemetery.

== See also ==
- List of members of the United States Congress who died in office (1790–1899)

U.S. House of Representatives
Preceded by Charles S. Randall	Member of the U.S. House of Representatives from Massachusetts's 1st congressional district March 4, 1893 – August 14, 1897	Succeeded by George P. Lawrence
