= Will H. Hays =

American politician (1879–1954)

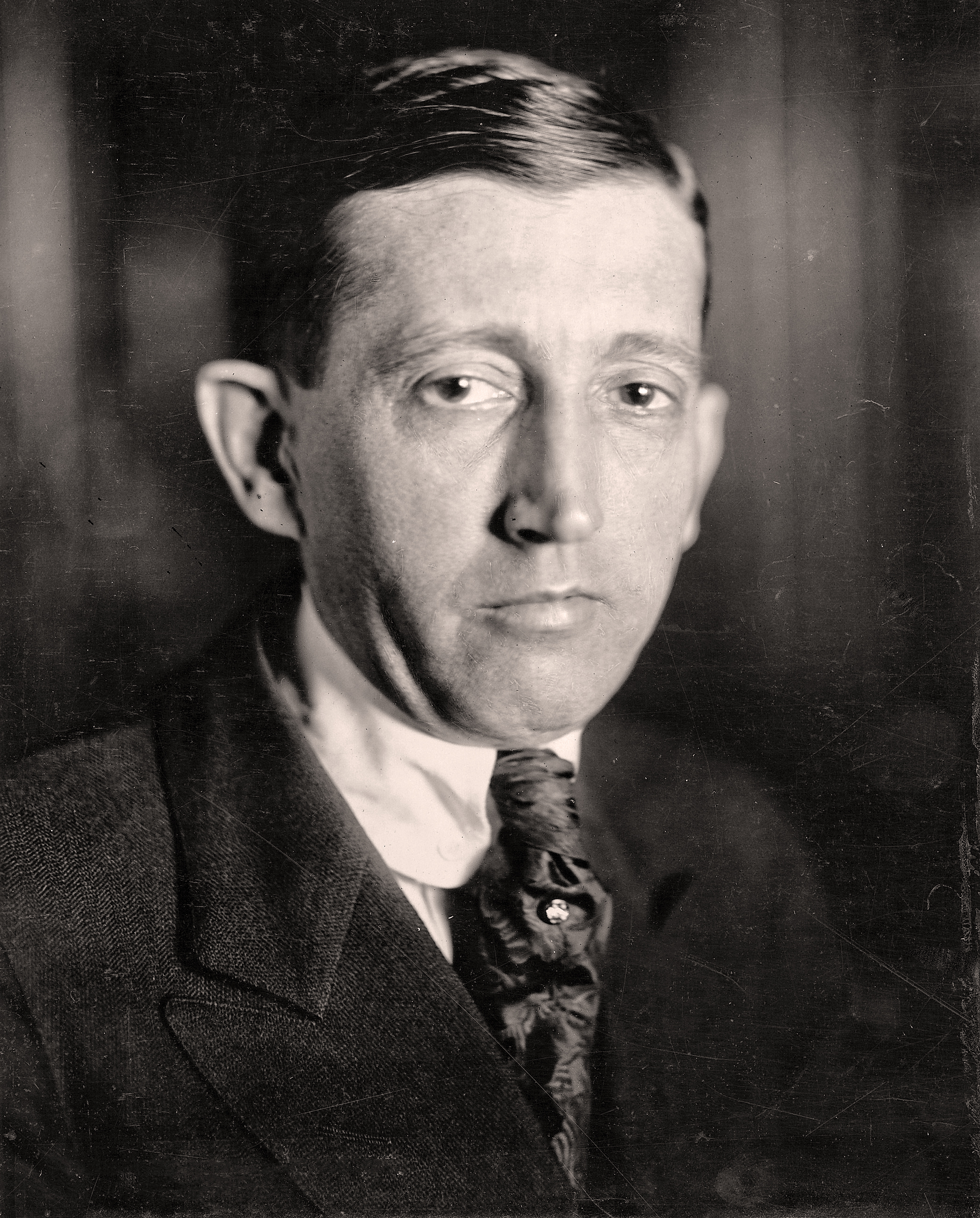
- Hays, c. 1921

Chairman of the Motion Picture Producers and Distributors of America
- In office April 1, 1922 – December 31, 1945
- Preceded by: Position established
- Succeeded by: Eric Johnston

46th United States Postmaster General
- In office March 5, 1921 – March 3, 1922
- President: Warren G. Harding
- Preceded by: Albert S. Burleson
- Succeeded by: Hubert Work

Chair of the Republican National Committee
- In office February 13, 1918 – June 8, 1921
- Preceded by: William Willcox
- Succeeded by: John T. Adams

Personal details
- Born: William Harrison Hays; November 5, 1879 Sullivan, Indiana, U.S.
- Died: March 7, 1954 (aged 74) Sullivan, Indiana, U.S.
- Party: Republican
- Spouses: Helen Louise Thomas (m. 1902; div. 1929) Jessie Herron Stutesman (m. 1930)
- Children: 1
- Education: Wabash College (BA, MA)

William Harrison Hays Sr. (/heɪz/; November 5, 1879 – March 7, 1954) was an American politician, and member of the Republican Party. As chairman of the Republican National Committee from 1918 to 1921, Hays managed the successful 1920 presidential campaign of Warren G. Harding. Harding then appointed Hays to his cabinet as his first Postmaster General. He resigned from the cabinet in 1922 to become the first chairman of the Motion Picture Producers and Distributors of America. As chairman, Hays oversaw the promulgation of the Motion Picture Production Code (informally known as the Hays Code), which spelled out a set of moral guidelines for the self-censorship of content in American cinema.

== Early life ==
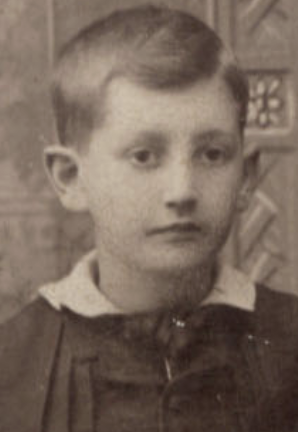
Hays, c. 1885

William Harrison Hays Sr. was born November 5, 1879, in Sullivan, Indiana, to Presbyterians John Tennyson and Mary (née Cain) Hays. The family's origins lay within various regions of the British Isles, one of which was Isle of Man, from which his maternal side had come. He recounted his home as having been "religious"—although "in no sense puritanical or severe"—providing "spiritual 'air conditioning' in which it was a joy to live." He was close to his maternal grandparents, William Henry and Nancy Duncan, whose lives extended to his years in college.

In 1888, future-President Benjamin Harrison, while in Sullivan for legal affairs—just prior to the imminent election—met Hays in his home, with Hays recollecting that Harrison was playing cards with his father, both of whom were involved in a regional court case.

In 1896, amid his adolescence, he witnessed the nomination of President William McKinley at the Republican National Convention in St. Louis; this is believed to be his inaugural exposure to politics.

Congruous with his childhood aspiration, he pursued law, attending Wabash College in Crawfordsville, Indiana, from which he received his BA in 1900—the year in which he was admitted to his state's bar—and MA in 1904.

== Career ==
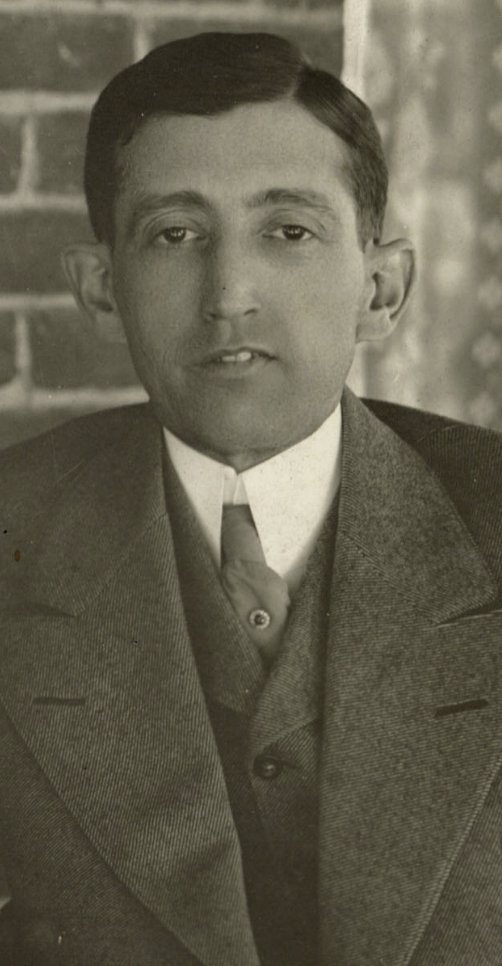
Hays in 1916, amid his political career in Indiana

From 1900 to 1918, Hays served in a variety of positions representing the Republican Party in various capacities within his home state of Indiana, beginning with his tenure on the 3rd Precinct Republican Committee.

He was the manager of Warren G. Harding's successful campaign for the Presidency of the United States in the 1920 election and was subsequently appointed Postmaster General. While serving in the Harding Administration, he became involved in the Teapot Dome scandal.

=== Teapot Dome scandal ===
The oilman Harry Ford Sinclair devised a scheme in which twenty-five cents was diverted from the sale of every barrel of oil sold from the oil field leases that were the focus of the Teapot Dome scandal. Sinclair testified that he "loaned" Will H. Hays, then-chairman of the Republican National Committee, $185,000 worth of Liberty Bonds, later getting back $100,000. Sinclair also gave Hays $75,000 as an outright gift to the committee. At the time, Hays was attempting to pay off the 1920 Republican campaign debt. Hays later approached a number of wealthy men and told them that if they would contribute to pay down the committee's debt, he would reimburse them for their contributions with Liberty Bonds.

In 1924, after his resignation from the Harding administration and while he was serving as President of the Motion Picture Producers and Distributors of America, Hays was called to testify before the Senate Committee on Public Lands. When asked how much money Sinclair had contributed to the Republican Party, Hays testified that his contribution was $75,000. In 1928, after more details of Sinclair's scheme had emerged, Hays was called to testify again. Hays then told the full story of Sinclair's contribution, including the donation of $185,000 in Liberty Bonds and the $75,000 cash contribution. He stated that he had not mentioned the bonds in his earlier testimony because the Committee "had not asked about any bonds." While there was some public perception that Hays was attempting to conceal Sinclair's large contribution to the Republican National Committee, he testified that he was "using the bonds to raise money for the deficit."

=== Chairman of the Motion Picture Producers and Distributors of America ===
Hays resigned his cabinet position on January 14, 1922, to become Chairman of the Motion Picture Producers and Distributors of America shortly after the organization's founding. He began his new job, at a $35,360 annual salary (equivalent to $680,000 in 2025), on March 6 of that year. There was speculation that he would be paid between $100,000 and $150,000 a year.

The goal of the organization was to improve the image of the movie industry in the wake of the scandal surrounding the alleged rape and murder of model and actress Virginia Rappe, of which film star Roscoe "Fatty" Arbuckle was accused, and amid growing calls by religious groups for federal censorship of the movies. Hiring Hays to "clean up the pictures" was, at least in part, a public relations ploy and much was made of his conservative credentials, including his roles as a Presbyterian deacon and past chairman of the Republican Party.

In his new position in Hollywood, Hays' main roles were to persuade individual state censor boards not to ban specific films outright and to reduce the financial impact of the boards' cuts and edits. At that time, the studios were required by state laws to pay the censor boards for each foot of film excised and for each title card edited; in addition, studios also had the expense of duplicating and distributing separate versions of each censored film for the state or states that adhered to a particular board's decisions.

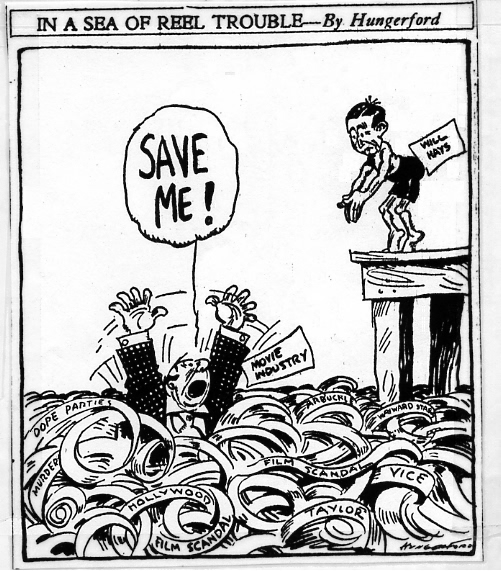
1922 editorial cartoon by Cy Hungerford illustrating the perception that Hays was coming to rescue the movie industry.

Hays attempted to reduce studio costs (and improve the industry's image in general) by advising individual studios on how to produce movies to reduce the likelihood that the film would be cut. Each board kept its "standards" secret (if, indeed, they had any standardization at all), so Hays was forced to intuit what would or would not be permitted by each board. At first he applied what he called "The Formula" but it was not particularly successful; from that he developed a set of guidelines he called "The Don'ts and Be Carefuls". In general his efforts at pre-release self-censorship were unsuccessful in quieting calls for federal censorship.

Catholic bishops and lay people tended to be wary of federal censorship and favored the Hays approach of self-censorship; these included the outspoken Catholic layman Martin J. Quigley, publisher of Exhibitors Herald-World (a trade magazine for independent exhibitors). For several months in 1929, Martin Quigley, Joseph Breen, Father Daniel A. Lord S.J., Father FitzGeorge Dinneen S.J., and Father Wilfred Parsons (editor of Catholic publication America) discussed the desirability of a new and more stringent code of behavior for the movies. With the blessing of Cardinal George W. Mundelein of Chicago, Father Lord authored the code, which later became known as "The Production Code", "the code", and "The Hays Code". It was presented to Will Hays in 1930 who said, "My eyes nearly popped out when I read it. This was the very thing I had been looking for".

The studio heads were less enthusiastic but they agreed to make the code the rule of the industry, albeit with many loopholes that allowed studio producers to override the Hays Office's application of it. From 1930 to 1934, the production code was only slightly effective in fighting back calls for federal censorship. However, things came to a head in 1934 with widespread threats of Catholic boycotts of "immoral" movies, as well as reduced funding from Catholic financiers such as A. P. Giannini of the Bank of America. As a result, the studios granted Hays' organization full authority to enforce the production code on all studios, creating a relatively strict regime of self-censorship which endured for decades (the code was set aside in the 1960s when the age-based rating system in force today was adopted). Hays hired Joseph Breen, a Catholic and antisemite who was able to use his position to censor films expressing sentiments against Nazism or fascism. In 1934, to deal with "inappropriate" industry personnel (alongside the Code's concern with the industry's output), Hays created a list of 117 names of performers whose personal lives he thought made them unfit to appear in films.

As an example of Hays' philosophy, he reportedly said to a movie director: "When you make a woman cross her legs in the films, maybe you don't need to see how she can cross them and stay within the law; but how low she can cross them and still be interesting".

Hays worked with the U.S. government, particularly the State Department and the Department of Commerce, to maintain Hollywood's domination of overseas movie markets.

=== Central Casting ===
When the entertainment industry started to take off in the early 1920s, thousands of people flocked to Hollywood with hopes of becoming the next big star. These hopefuls were called "extras" because they were the extra people who filled out scenes. The main way to find work at this time was to wait outside the gates of studios, hoping to be hired on the spot. With little regulation on hiring film extras, many people were exploited while looking for work. In an effort to fix the employment issues and exploitation that plagued the industry, Hays commissioned several studies of the employment conditions in Hollywood, including one from Mary van Kleeck, a prominent sociologist with the Russell Sage Foundation. After reviewing the results of the studies, Hays adopted a suggestion of van Kleeck's and created the Central Casting Corporation in 1925 as a way to regulate the hiring of extras in Hollywood.

=== Production Code ===
The production code enumerated three "General Principles":

1. No picture shall be produced that will lower the moral standards of those who see it. Hence the sympathy of the audience should never be thrown to the side of crime, wrongdoing, evil or sin.
2. Correct standards of life, subject only to the requirements of drama and entertainment, shall be presented.
3. Law, natural or human, shall not be ridiculed, nor shall sympathy be created for its violation.

Specific restrictions were spelled out as "Particular Applications" of these principles:

- Nudity and suggestive dances were prohibited.
- The ridicule of religion was forbidden, and ministers of religion were not to be represented as comic characters or villains.
- The depiction of illegal drug use was forbidden, as well as the use of liquor, "when not required by the plot or for proper characterization."
- Methods of crime (e.g. safe-cracking, arson, smuggling) were not to be explicitly presented.
- References to sex perversions such as homosexuality and venereal disease were forbidden, as were depictions of childbirth.
- The language section banned various words and phrases that were considered to be offensive.
- Murder scenes had to be filmed in a way that would discourage imitations in real life, and brutal killings could not be shown in detail.
- "Revenge in modern times" was not to be justified.
- The sanctity of marriage and the home had to be upheld.
- "Pictures shall not infer that low forms of sex relationship are the accepted or common thing."
- Adultery and illicit sex, although recognized as sometimes necessary to the plot, could not be explicit or justified and were not supposed to be presented as an attractive option.
- Portrayals of miscegenation were forbidden.
- "Scenes of Passion" were not to be introduced when not essential to the plot.
- "Excessive and lustful kissing" was to be avoided, along with any other treatment that might "stimulate the lower and baser element."
- The flag of the United States was to be treated respectfully, and the people and history of other nations were to be presented "fairly."
- "Vulgarity", defined as "low, disgusting, unpleasant, though not necessarily evil, subjects" must be "subject to the dictates of good taste."
- Capital punishment, "third-degree methods", cruelty to children and animals, prostitution and surgical operations were to be handled with similar sensitivity.

== Personal life ==
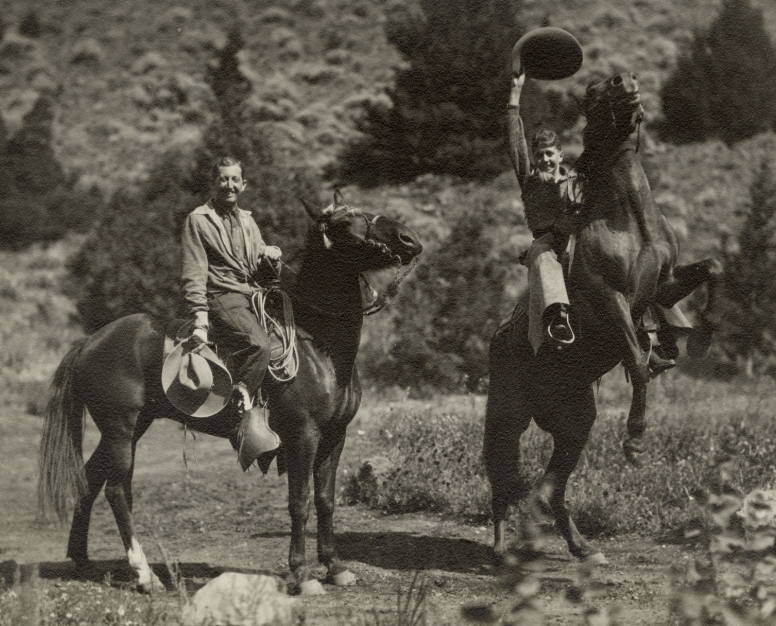
Hays and his first wife, c. 1902

Hays married Helen Louise Thomas (1879–1957) on November 18, 1902, with whom he was engaged earlier that year. They ultimately divorced on June 20, 1929, and Hays received custody of their son, William Jr. (1915–2000), who served as the Mayor of Crawfordsville, Indiana, from 1963 to 1971.

After his retirement, Will H. Hays returned to Sullivan, Indiana, where he died on March 7, 1954. His widow died in 1960.

== In popular culture ==
In their 1940 short No Census, No Feeling, The Three Stooges refer to Will Hays and his position as censor czar in a joke, when Moe tells Curly, "We have a job now, we're working for the Census"; Curly replies "You mean Will Hays?" in a word association of "census" and "censors".

In the 1942 Looney Tunes cartoon A Tale of Two Kitties, an Abbott and Costello parody, two cats, Babbit and Catstello, try to eat a naked "tweety" bird. During the ladder scene, Babbit yells "Give me the bird!" To which Catstello replies, "If the Hays Office would only let me, I'd give 'im the boid all right!"

== See also ==
- Film censorship in the United States
- Introduction of Vitaphone Sound Pictures – 1926 film with Will H. Hays
- List of people on the cover of Time Magazine: 1920s – September 13, 1926
- Nazism and cinema – Nazi influence on film between 1933–1945

== Bibliography ==
- Black, Gregory D. Hollywood Censored: Morality Codes, Catholics, and the Movies. New York: Cambridge University Press, 1994; ISBN 0-521-45299-6.
- Hays, Will H. The Memoirs of Will H. Hays. Garden City, New York: Doubleday & Company, Inc., 1955.
- Jarvie, Ian. Hollywood's Overseas Campaign: The North Atlantic Movie Trade, 1920–1950. New York: Cambridge University Press, 1992.
- Trumpbour, John. Selling Hollywood to the World: U.S. and European Struggles for Mastery of the Global Film Industry, 1920–1950. New York: Cambridge University Press, 2002.

Party political offices
Preceded by William Willcox	Chair of the Republican National Committee; 1918–1921	Succeeded by John T. Adams
Political offices
Preceded by Albert S. Burleson	United States Postmaster General; 1921–1922	Succeeded by Hubert Work
Non-profit organization positions
New office	Chairman of the Motion Picture Association of America; 1922–1945	Succeeded by Eric Johnston
