= Alfred Seelye Roe =

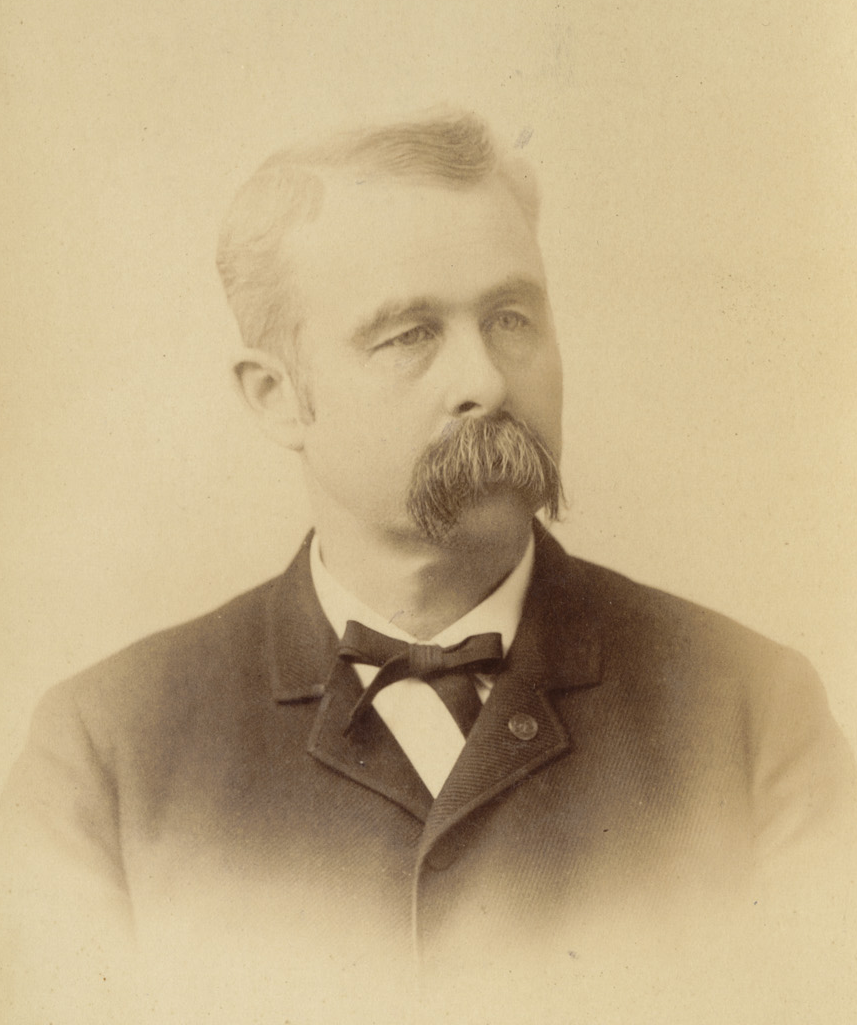
Roe in 1893

Alfred Seelye Roe (1844–1917) was a soldier in the Union Army during the American Civil War, a teacher and principal, a historian and author, and a state legislator in Massachusetts.

The son of Methodist minister, Rev. Austin M. Roe he married Polly Catharine Seelye Roe.

He was a teacher in Middleville, New York before he enlisted to serve in the United States military. He served with Company A, Ninth New York Heavy Artillery, from January 1864 to June 1865 and was captured by General Early's soldiers in the Battle of Monocacy in Maryland on July 9, 1864. He was held at Danville Prison in Danville, Virginia for almost eight months.

After the war he attended Wesleyan University, graduating in 1870. He became a high school principal in Ashland, Massachusetts and then in Worcester, Massachusetts where he was elected to serve in Massachusetts' legislature. He wrote a regimental history of the 9th New York Heavy Artillery with Charles Nutt, a history of Rose, New York. He also wrote about Worcester's involvement in the "Spanish War" and edited Worcester Light and Worcester Magazine. He married Nora A. Metcalf of Ashland, Massachusetts June 22, 1874. They had four children.

Some of his writings and soeeches were published. The New York Public Library has his journal My Trip Abroad with Notes and Comments on What I Saw and Heard (1890) covering his trip to Europe. Wesleyan University has a collection of his Civil War era papers including letters and an account of his time as a prisoner of war.

Author and immigration rights advocate Mary Antin corresponded with him.

In 1915, he read a paper marking the 100th anniversary of the Seelye family on the United States.

He married Nora Ardelia Metcalf (1856–1910) on June 22, 1874. They had four children. He died January 6, 1917 in Worcester.

== Writings ==
- John Brown: A Retrospect
- The Twenty-fourth regiment, Massachusetts volunteers, 1861–1866 (1907)
- The Thirty-ninth Regiment Massachusetts Volunteers, 1862–1865 (1914)

== See also ==
- 1892 Massachusetts legislature
- 1893 Massachusetts legislature
- 1894 Massachusetts legislature
- 1895 Massachusetts legislature
- 1896 Massachusetts legislature
- 1897 Massachusetts legislature
- 1898 Massachusetts legislature
