= Robert T. Teamoh =

American politician, journalist (1864–1912)

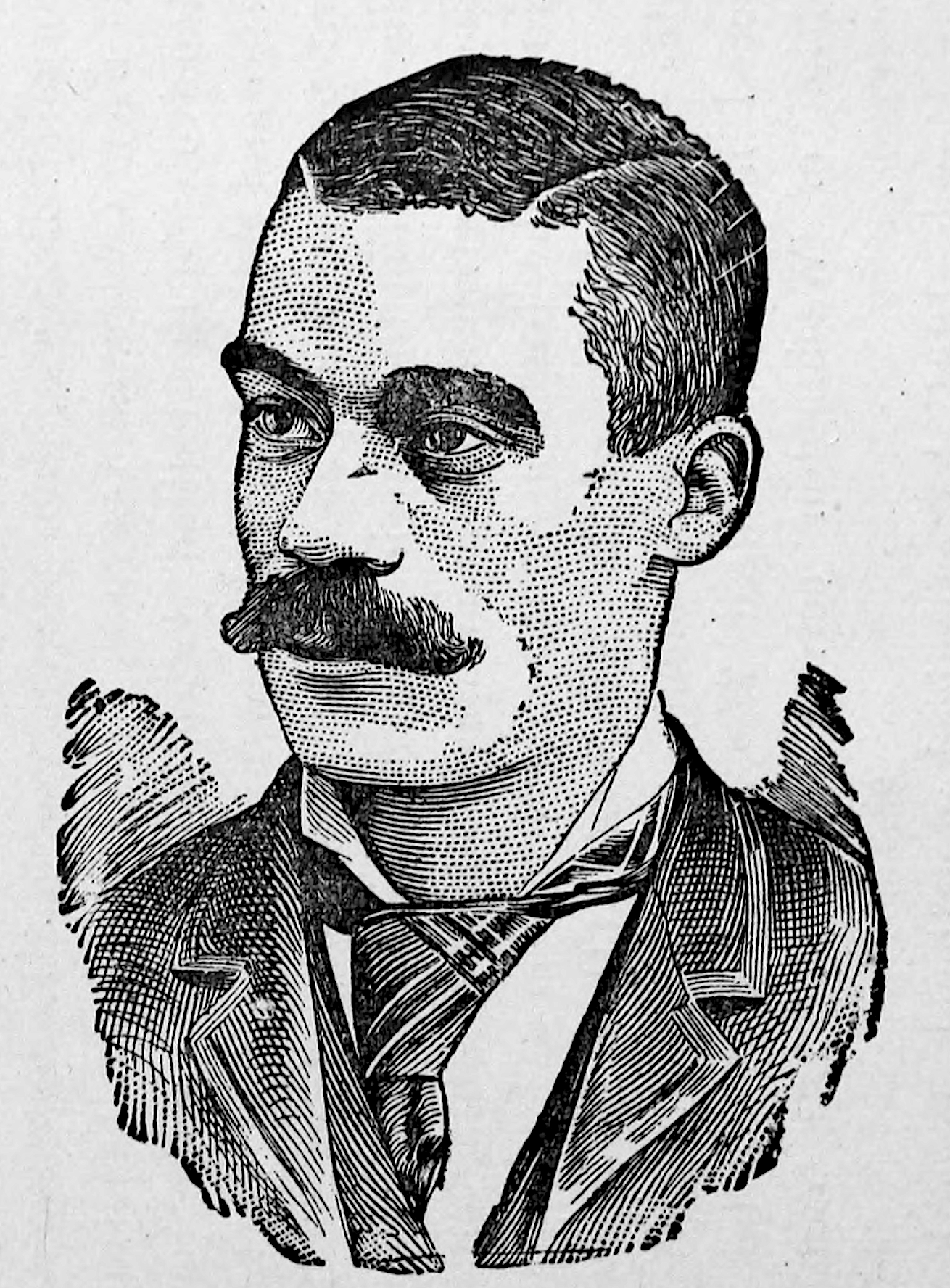

Massachusetts House of Representatives
- In office 1894–1895
- Succeeded by: William L. Reed

Personal details
- Born: March 25, 1864 Boston, Massachusetts, U.S.
- Died: June 20, 1912 (aged 48) Boston, Massachusetts, U.S.
- Party: Republican
- Spouse: Julia Jackson (m. 1894)
- Relations: George Teamoh (uncle)
- Children: Robert Shaw Teamoh
- Education: Massachusetts College of Art and Design
- Occupation: Journalist, newspaper editor, printmaker, politician

Robert Thomas Teamoh (March 25, 1864 – June 20, 1912; pen name: Scribbler) was an American journalist, newspaper editor, printmaker, and politician. He worked as a reporter for The Boston Globe, and was a state legislator in Massachusetts. He lived in Boston, Massachusetts.

== Personal life ==
Robert Thomas Teamoh was born on March 25, 1864, in Boston, Massachusetts to parents Thomas and Margaret Patterson Teamoh. He was the nephew of Virginia state senator George Teamoh.

He attended Boston Latin School. Teamoh graduated in 1879 from Boston Industrial Drawing School (now Massachusetts College of Art and Design).

In 1894, he married Julia Jackson.

== Career ==
In his early career Teamoh worked briefly at The Observer, a "colored" newspaper in Boston. He worked in photoengraving, and had opened up a related business in New London, Connecticut.

Teamoh was a city editor for The Boston Leader newspaper, as well as a contributor to The New York Age, and The Boston Advocate under the pen name "Scribbler". Teamoh worked for The Boston Globe newspaper for over 20 years. He is believed to be the first African American reporter for a white newspaper in Boston.

He represented Ward 9 of the 1894 Massachusetts legislature. He was part of a delegation of legislators that visited Virginia. Charles Triplett O'Ferrall, Virginia's governor, refused the meet with the delegation while Teamoh was part of it. This caused some outrage and protest in Massachusetts. Journalist Josephine St. Pierre Ruffin criticized Teamoh in her newspaper, Woman's Era, for "servile complicity" in the O'Ferrall incident. He was succeeded in office by William L. Reed in 1896. Teamoh was a known Freemason and an early proponent of bicycling.

He died on June 20, 1912, at Massachusetts General Hospital, Boston. His funeral was held at the First A.M.E. Church of Boston, and they held a Masonic funeral service.

Teamoh is profiled in the book The Afro-American Press and Its Editors (1891).
