= 1894 Massachusetts legislature =

115th Massachusetts General Court
←	114th	116th	→

Overview
- Legislative body: General Court
- Election: November 7, 1893

Senate
- Members: 40
- President: William M. Butler
- Party control: Republican (33–7)

House
- Members: 240
- Speaker: George von Lengerke Meyer
- Party control: Republican (183–56–1)

Sessions
- 1st: January 3, 1894 – July 2, 1894

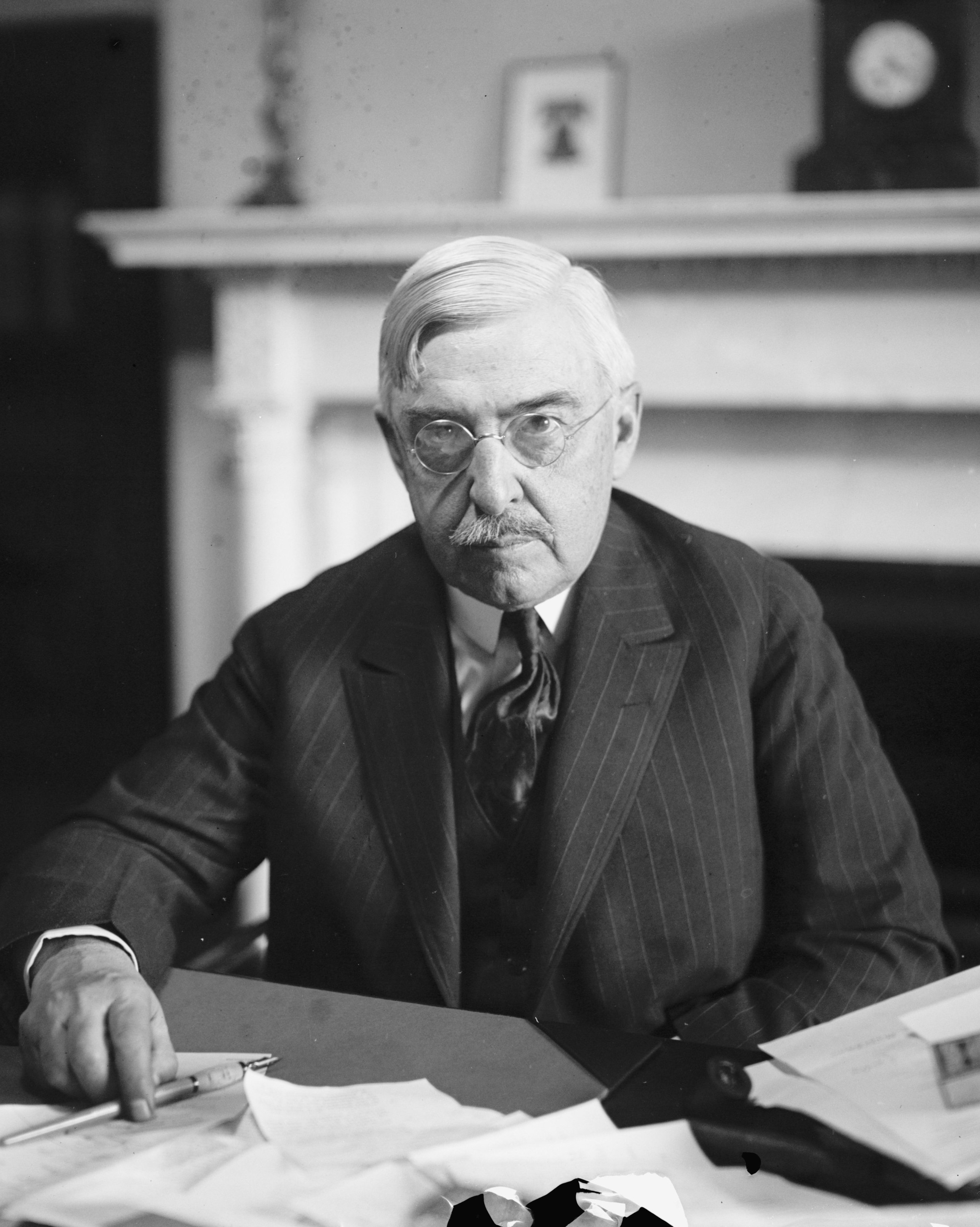
William Butler, Senate president.

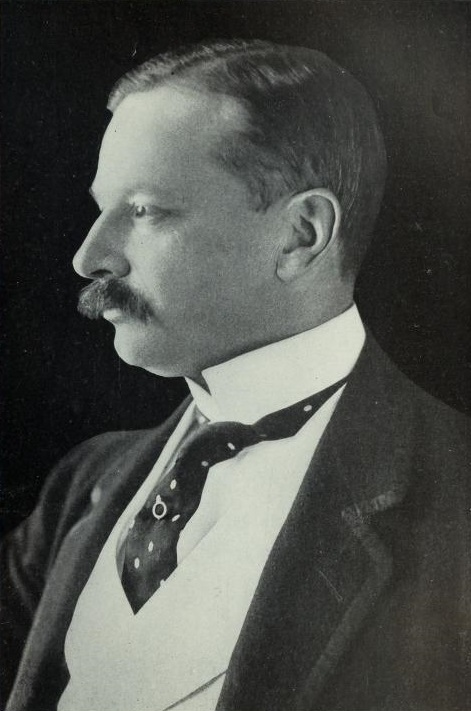
George von Lengerke Meyer, House speaker.

Leaders of the Massachusetts General Court, 1894.

The 115th Massachusetts General Court, consisting of the Massachusetts Senate and the Massachusetts House of Representatives, met in 1894 during the governorship of Frederic T. Greenhalge. William M. Butler served as president of the Senate and George von Lengerke Meyer served as speaker of the House.

== Senators ==
image	name	date of birth	district
	Edward B. Atwood	May 13, 1845	1st Plymouth
	James Lewis Austin	March 19, 1851	1st Bristol
	Joseph F. Bartlett	July 25, 1843	Franklin
	Francis T. Berry	August 18, 1849	2nd Essex
	Eugene A. Bessom	June 11, 1855	1st Essex
	Ledyard Bill	1836	3rd Worcester
	S. Stillman Blanchard	June 23, 1835	7th Suffolk
	Peter Joseph Brady	October 29, 1861	7th Middlesex
	Charles F. Brown	October 21, 1848	6th Middlesex
	William P. Buckley	August 15, 1859	2nd Hampden
	Albert S. Burnham	September 25, 1850	1st Suffolk
	William M. Butler	January 29, 1861	3rd Bristol
	Maurice F. Coughlin	December 29, 1856	4th Middlesex
	John F. Cronan	April 9, 1856	8th Suffolk
	William B. Durant	September 29, 1844	3rd Middlesex
	John F. Fitzgerald	February 11, 1863	3rd Suffolk
	Edward G. Frothingham	August 12, 1837	4th Essex
	George L. Gage	February 6, 1845	6th Essex
	Robert S. Gray	September 28, 1847	2nd Norfolk
	George Henry Bartlett Green	December 15, 1845	Worcester and Hampshire
	Edwin B. Harvey	April 4, 1834	2nd Worcester
	Gilbert L. Jewett	December 22, 1839	Berkshire
	John Kenrick Jr.	October 25, 1857	Cape
	Francis W. Kittredge	June 4, 1843	9th Suffolk
	William B. Lawrence	November 15, 1856	1st Middlesex
	Edward Joseph Leary	May 27, 1860	6th Suffolk
	Edwin Francis Lyford	September 8, 1857	1st Hampden
	John Flint Merrill	January 16, 1849	1st Norfolk
	Joel D. Miller	October 10, 1837	4th Worcester
	Henry S. Milton	September 28, 1855	2nd Middlesex
	Hiram A. Monk	July 16, 1829	2nd Plymouth
	Jeremiah Henry Mullane	August 15, 1852	4th Suffolk
	Joseph O. Neill	January 31, 1838	2nd Bristol
	John B. Ripley	July 8, 1849	Berkshire and Hampshire
	Stephen Salisbury III	March 31, 1835	1st Worcester
	George P. Sanger	September 6, 1852	5th Suffolk
	Samuel L. Sawyer	June 20, 1845	5th Essex
	Elisha H. Shaw	September 29, 1847	5th Middlesex
	Sylvanus Smith	March 10, 1829	3rd Essex
	George N. Swallow	January 2, 1854	2nd Suffolk

== Representatives ==
image	name	date of birth	district
	John E. Abbott	November 30, 1845	
	Walter Adams	May 15, 1848	
	John Clark Alden	April 4, 1836	
	Newell D. Atwood	April 6, 1866	
	John Edward Bacon	1837	
	James Alderson Bailey Jr.	March 25, 1867	
	Charles Grey Bancroft	December 3, 1866	
	Solon Bancroft	June 22, 1839	
	Albert F. Barker	October 24, 1859	
	Charles Waldo Bates	July 10, 1846	
	Frederick H. Bates	September 15, 1857	
	John L. Bates	September 18, 1859	
	Amos Beckford	March 13, 1828	
	Frank P. Bennett	May 2, 1853	
	Frank S. Bennett	May 12, 1857	
	George H. Bixby	February 21, 1854	
	Frederic Wright Bliss	October 14, 1852	
	Henry Clay Bliss	May 5, 1846	
	Edward F. Blodgett	August 9, 1848	
	Dwight Boardman	October 23, 1835	
	Edward S. Bradford	December 1, 1842	
	Fred H. Bradford	July 13, 1850	
	Pharcellus Dean Bridges	December 21, 1846	
	Thomas A. Brooks	December 22, 1858	
	Robert C. Brown	November 5, 1867	
	George H. Buck	March 31, 1843	
	Walter Jesse David Bullock	July 11, 1860	
	William H. Burges	November 3, 1835	
	Jason Butler	1847	
	Allen Francis Carpenter	February 28, 1842	
	Charles W. Carroll	November 1, 1863	
	Daniel C. Casey	August 10, 1867	
	Joseph J. Casey	December 25, 1863	
	Frank Cass	September 14, 1857	
	Charles Sydney Chase	January 10, 1840	
	Dwight Chester	March 2, 1835	
	Philip Embury Clarke	September 11, 1837	
	Daniel H. Coakley	December 10, 1865	
	Samuel Coffin	October 9, 1827	
	Henry C. Comins	April 11, 1837	
	Heman S. Cook	May 13, 1840	
	James Oliver Cook	August 22, 1842	
	Marcus C. Cook	March 14, 1827	
	Erastus C. Coy	July 25, 1831	
	Charles H. Crane	May 8, 1845	
	Myron D. Cressy	October 30, 1851	
	Arthur B. Curtis	November 30, 1854	
	George P. Cutler	December 7, 1829	
	Frederick W. Dallinger	October 2, 1871	
	Francis W. Darling	December 16, 1852	
	Benjamin Day	September 4, 1822	
	Charles W. Delvey	January 13, 1848	
	William D. Dennis	October 11, 1847	
	James H. Derbyshire	June 11, 1855	
	Owen M. Donohoe	October 21, 1861	
	William F. Donovan	December 29, 1866	
	William J. Donovan	October 31, 1862	
	James Joseph Dowd	July 4, 1857	
	James H. Doyle	June 17, 1867	
	William H. Drew	March 27, 1855	
	Robert Duddy	1847	
	George Morton Eddy	August 5, 1843	
	Alpheus M. Eldredge	January 25, 1828	
	Edward James Harris Estabrooks	April 16, 1841	
	George C. Ewing	January 15, 1843	
	Thomas F. Fallon	December 7, 1857	
	Joseph Byron Farley	October 10, 1847	
	Philip J. Farley	January 3, 1864	
	Charles Favreau	January 31, 1851	
	James H. Ferguson	July 12, 1851	
	Clarentine E. Ferson	May 19, 1845	
	Eugene Finn	July 16, 1863	
	Henry H. Fisk	June 5, 1843	
	James H. Flint	June 25, 1852	
	Cornelius J. Flynn	March 21, 1848	
	Ether S. Foss	June 10, 1834	
	Granville Edward Foss	August 16, 1842	
	Otis Foss	October 4, 1838	
	George E. Fowle	July 4, 1837	
	Granville Austin Fuller	March 13, 1837	
	George A. Galloupe	October 28, 1850	
	John Dennis Hammond Gauss	January 4, 1861	
	Michael P. Geary	August 16, 1868	
	Samuel Wesley George	April 26, 1862	
	Charles Giddings	May 10, 1867	
	James Love Gillingham	July 12, 1857	
	James F. Gleason	August 8, 1862	
	Samuel S. Gleason	May 1, 1842	
	Edwin D. Goodell	August 16, 1842	
	William T. Graham	February 1, 1861	
	Alexander Grant	September 26, 1853	
	Charles Greene	May 10, 1840	
	Thomas Ellwood Grover	February 9, 1846	
	John Haigh	November 17, 1839	
	Edward A. Hale	January 11, 1850	
	Charles L. Hammond	September 1, 1860	
	Noah Hammond	February 8, 1833	
	Clarke Partridge Harding	June 20, 1853	
	Franklin P. Harlow		
	Charles H. Hartshorn	March 25, 1840	
	Benjamin C. Harvey	September 4, 1847	
	Arthur Hastings	December 9, 1846	
	Bowers C. Hathaway	March 18, 1823	
	Frederic W. Hathaway	March 6, 1836	
	James E. Hayes	August 10, 1865	
	Richard J. Hayes	October 4, 1861	
	William Henry Irving Hayes	June 21, 1848	
	George A. Hibbard	October 27, 1864	
	George C. Higgins	November 19, 1845	
	John J. Hoar	June 1, 1864	
	Timothy Holland	July 12, 1865	
	Solon O. Holt	December 11, 1839	
	Henry Augustine Howard	May 2, 1842	
	Louis P. Howe	May 29, 1858	
	Edwin A. Hubbard	November 26, 1848	
	Henry D. Humphrey	June 20, 1861	
	William H. Hutchinson	March 26, 1834	
	Richard William Irwin	February 18, 1857	
	Dwight H. Ives	January 28, 1837	
	William S. Jenks	December 1, 1855	
	Edward P. Johnson	October 21, 1844	
	George R. Jones	February 8, 1862	
	Cyrus Anson Jordan	April 7, 1859	
	Orrin F. Joslin	December 14, 1831	
	S. Smith Joy	April 21, 1841	
	John Kelley	November 21, 1855	
	Joseph J. Kelley	February 22, 1868	
	John E. Kellogg	July 2, 1845	
	Daniel J. Kinnaly	May 8, 1855	
	Arthur Shimmin Kneil	May 6, 1861	
	Joseph Brewster Knox	December 12, 1828	
	Howard G. Lane	December 15, 1850	
	James Cushing Leach	June 11, 1831	
	William A. Lenihan	December 12, 1862	
	Ottho William Lewis	July 17, 1853	
	Oliver C. Livermore	July 21, 1838	
	Henry Goodwin Loomis	August 8, 1842	
	George E. Lovett	February 27, 1849	
	Irenaeus H. Low	December 15, 1847	
	Timothy P. Lyman	August 6, 1834	
	John M. Lynch	November 26, 1860	
	John A. Macomber, 2d	January 25, 1849	
	Patrick Mahan	March 15, 1840	
	John J. Mahoney	April 13, 1860	
	Dana Malone	October 8, 1857	
	William P. Martin	July 30, 1858	
	Jeremiah Justin McCarthy	March 29, 1852	
	William Henry McInerney	March 17, 1866	
	Hugh McLaughlin	April 18, 1852	
	William Henry McMorrow	March 23, 1871	
	James F. Melaven	November 19, 1858	
	James H. Mellen	November 7, 1845	
	Matthew H. Merriam	August 16, 1824	
	Oliver B. Merrill	January 11, 1836	
	Marcus M. Merritt	April 1, 1839	
	George von Lengerke Meyer	June 24, 1858	
	Edwin Child Miller	December 1, 1857	
	Joseph F. Mooney	May 21, 1866	
	William Moran	September 6, 1855	
	Eugene Michael Moriarty	April 15, 1849	
	Charles Otis Morrill	February 10, 1851	
	Alvertus W. Morse	January 21, 1841	
	Daniel Murphy	September 25, 1843	
	James Stuart Murphy	September 5, 1860	
	John L. Murphy	May 8, 1863	
	Timothy F. Murphy	August 9, 1864	
	James J. Myers	November 20, 1842	
	Melvin S. Nash	August 3, 1857	
	George H. Newhall	October 24, 1850	
	John B. Newhall	October 1, 1862	
	Jarvis Norcott	December 17, 1823	
	Michael J. O'Brien	November 9, 1855	
	Theodore K. Parker	September 3, 1841	
	John E. Parry	July 3, 1854	
	John E. Perry	June 20, 1832	
	Carlton T. Phelps	October 13, 1867	
	Edward W. Pinkham	February 9, 1839	
	Joseph B. Poor	June 7, 1850	
	Burrill Porter	February 22, 1832	
	J. Frank Porter	April 8, 1847	
	John Jacob Prevaux	March 16, 1857	
	John Quinn, Jr.	December 16, 1859	
	Nicolas M. Quint	July 18, 1838	
	Samuel Miner Raymond	June 30, 1842	
	Charles R. Read		
	Clarence E. Richardson	May 13, 1847	
	John S. Richardson	August 25, 1855	
	Robert A. Richardson	1840	
	Royal Robbins	December 12, 1865	
	Ernest W. Roberts	November 22, 1858	
	Alfred Seelye Roe	June 8, 1844	
	Alfred V. Rogerson	August 24, 1840	
	Isaac Rosnosky	November 6, 1846	
	Samuel Ross	February 2, 1865	
	Charles P. Rugg	August 12, 1827	
	Thomas A. Russell	June 17, 1858	
	Martin F. Ryder	November 1, 1854	
	Henry F. Sampson	May 12, 1835	
	George Melville Scates	September 30, 1841	
	Chester B. Scudder	October 6, 1844	
	William P. Searls	June 3, 1851	
	John Timothy Shea	February 14, 1866	
	Joseph Lucien Shipley	March 31, 1836	
	Charles Francis Shute	June 17, 1838	
	Henry Young Simpson	September 13, 1843	
	David F. Slade	November 5, 1855	
	Anthony Smalley	March 15, 1836	
	Clayton D. Smith	March 31, 1857	
	George L. Soule	March 25, 1832	
	Warren F. Spalding	January 14, 1841	
	William Henry Sprague	June 27, 1845	
	Arthur L. Spring	February 25, 1858	
	Thomas E. St. John	March 2, 1831	
	Charles F. Sturtevant	March 31, 1848	
	James J. Sullivan	December 22, 1865	
	Richard Sullivan	February 24, 1856	
	James Francis Sweeney	September 19, 1859	
	Robert T. Teamoh	1864	
	Eben F. Thompson	January 29, 1859	
	James Atherton Tilden	December 6, 1835	
	Cornelius H. Toland	November 2, 1868	
	William Tolman	June 2, 1858	
	Isaac Brownell Tompkins	August 17, 1826	
	Daniel P. Toomey	March 16, 1861	
	William M. Townsend	August 24, 1845	
	Jacob Tucker	December 23, 1835	
	Michael Tuite	June 29, 1853	
	John E. Tuttle	November 3, 1835	
	Charles Henry Utley	November 27, 1857	
	Stephen Cady Warriner	August 25, 1839	
	Arthur Holbrook Wellman	October 30, 1855	
	George L. Wentworth	May 24, 1852	
	Thomas Weston	September 23, 1826	
	William H. Wheeler	September 4, 1848	
	George E. White	June 13, 1849	
	Henry A. Whitney	July 1, 1842	
	Eugene W. Wood	May 10, 1832	
	Frank C. Wood	September 20, 1849	
	Alfred A. Woodbury	November 26, 1862	
	John Loring Woodfall	September 15, 1847	

== See also ==
- 53rd United States Congress
- List of Massachusetts General Courts
