= George P. Lawrence =

American politician (1859–1917)

George Pelton Lawrence
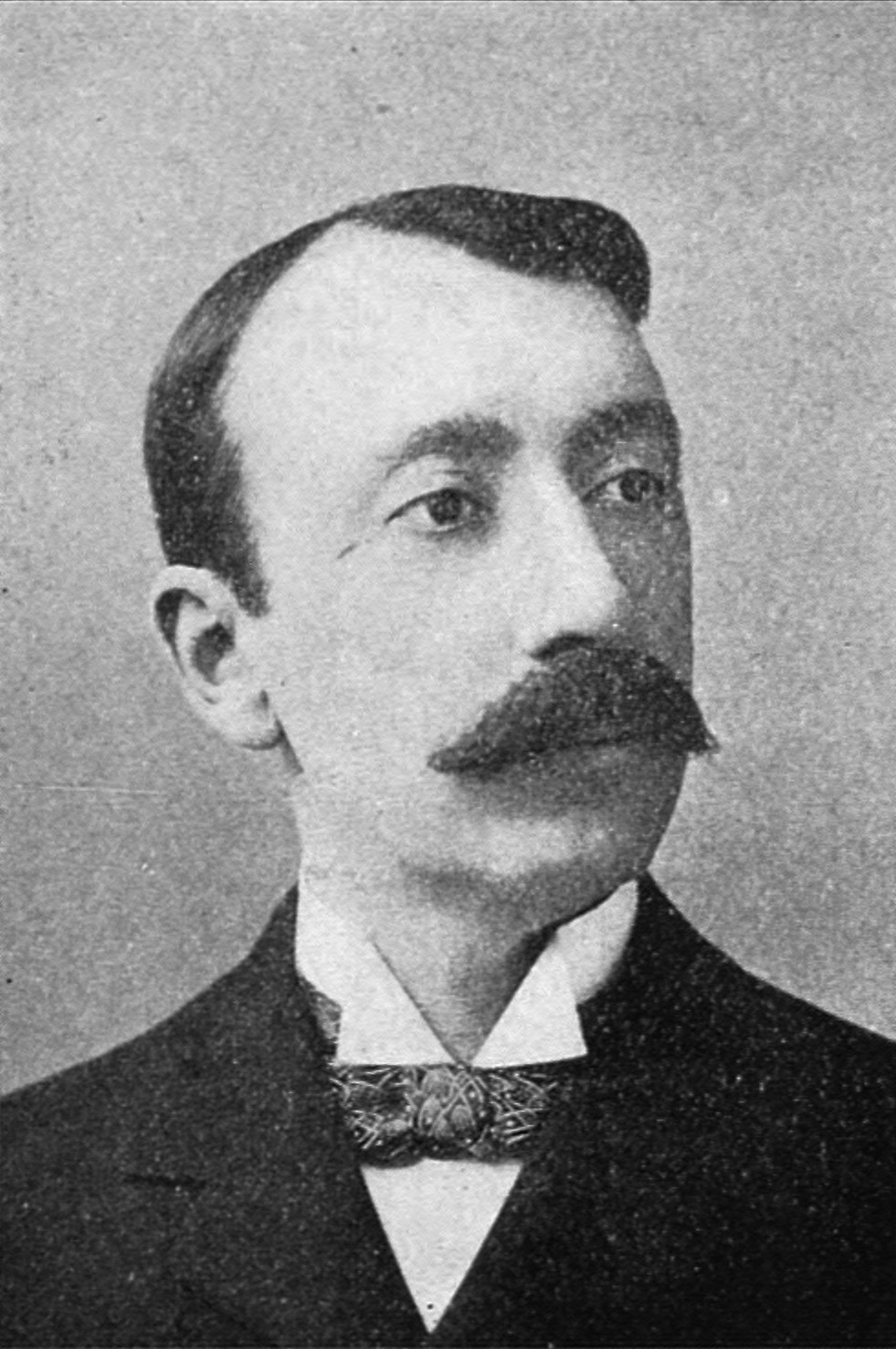
- George P. Lawrence circa 1908

Member of the U.S. House of Representatives from Massachusetts's 1st district
- In office November 2, 1897 – March 3, 1913
- Preceded by: Ashley B. Wright
- Succeeded by: Allen T. Treadway

President of the Massachusetts Senate
- In office 1896–1897
- Preceded by: William M. Butler
- Succeeded by: George E. Smith

Member of the Massachusetts Senate
- In office 1895–1897

Judge of the District Court of North Berkshire
- In office 1885–1894

Personal details
- Born: May 19, 1859 Adams, Massachusetts, U.S.
- Died: November 21, 1917 (aged 58) New York, New York, U.S.
- Party: Republican

George Pelton Lawrence (May 19, 1859 – November 21, 1917) was a member of the United States House of Representatives from Massachusetts.

== Early life and education ==
Born in Adams, Massachusetts, Lawrence was the son of Dr. George C. Lawrence and his wife, Jane E. Pelton, and also the nephew of New York City Congressman Guy Ray Pelton. He graduated from Drury Academy in 1876 and from Amherst College in 1880. Lawrence studied law at the Columbia Law School. On June 12, 1889, Pelton married Susannah Hope Bracewell (1866-1914).

== Legal career ==
Lawrence was admitted to the bar in 1883 and commenced practice in North Adams.

== Public service ==
=== Judgeship ===
Lawrence was appointed judge of the judicial district of northern Berkshire, County in 1885. Lawrence resigned his judgeship in 1894 upon being elected to the Massachusetts Senate.

=== Massachusetts Senate ===
Lawrence served in the senate from 1895 to 1897 and was its President, in 1896 and 1897.

=== Congressional service ===
Lawrence was elected as a Republican to the Fifty-fifth Congress to fill the vacancy caused by the death of Ashley B. Wright. Lawrence was reelected to the Fifty-sixth and to the six succeeding Congresses and served from November 2, 1897, to March 3, 1913. While in Congress Lawrence was chairman of the Committee on Expenditures in the Department of War (Fifty-ninth through Sixty-first Congresses).

== Post Congressional career ==
Lawrence was not a candidate for renomination in 1912, and from July 1 to September 17, 1913, was a member of the Massachusetts Public Service Commission.

== Death ==
Lawrence jumped from an eighth-floor window and fell to his death, at the Belmont Hotel, New York, New York; interment was in Hillside Cemetery, North Adams.

== See also ==
- 117th Massachusetts General Court (1896)

== Bibliography ==
- Who's Who in State Politics, 1908 Practical Politics (1908) p. 15.
- United States Congress. "George P. Lawrence (id: L000133)". Biographical Directory of the United States Congress.

Political offices
Preceded by William M. Butler	President of the Massachusetts Senate; January 1896 – January 1897	Succeeded by George E. Smith
U.S. House of Representatives
Preceded by Ashley B. Wright	Member of the U.S. House of Representatives from Massachusetts's 1st congressional district November 2, 1897 – March 3, 1913	Succeeded by Allen T. Treadway
