= Franklin O. Barnes =

American lawyer and politician

Franklin Osgood Barnes
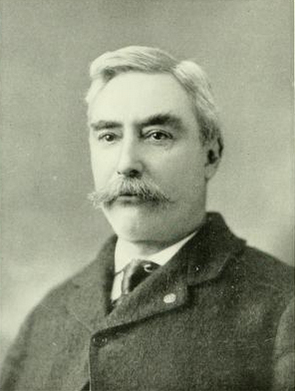

Member of the Massachusetts House of Representatives 26th Middlesex District
- In office 1889–1890

Member of the Massachusetts House of Representatives 26th Middlesex District
- In office 1895–1897

Member of the Chelsea, Massachusetts School Committee

President of the Chelsea, Massachusetts Common Council
- In office 1875–1876

Member of the Chelsea, Massachusetts Common Council
- In office 1875–1876

Member of the Chelsea, Massachusetts Common Council
- In office 1870–1871

Personal details
- Born: November 14, 1841 Chelsea, Massachusetts
- Died: December 18, 1900 (aged 59) Chelsea, Massachusetts
- Party: Republican
- Profession: Lawyer

Military service
- Allegiance: United States of America
- Branch/service: United States Navy
- Years of service: August 16, 1862 - July 30, 1863
- Rank: Corporal
- Commands: Company H 43rd Regiment Massachusetts Volunteer Infantry
- Battles/wars: American Civil War

Franklin Osgood Barnes (1841-1900) was an American lawyer and politician who served as a Member of the Massachusetts House of Representatives.
