= William H. Marden =

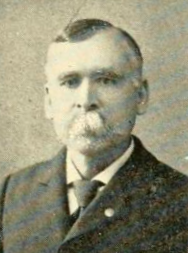
Marden, in 1898

William Henry Marden (May 30, 1843 – 1903) was an American politician and labor unionist.

Marden was born in Charlestown, Massachusetts. He served in the U.S. Civil War with the 6th Infantry Regiment and the 2nd United States Sharpshooters, rising to become a sergeant after the Battle of Gettysburg. After the war, he was a founding member of the Grand Army of the Republic.

Marden initially worked as a farmer, then became a shoe later. He joined the Knights of St. Crispin, and became secretary of its lodge in Stoneham, Massachusetts. He later joined the Knights of Labor, and then the New England Lasters' Protective Union. He served as treasurer of the New England Lasters from the late 1880s, continuing as it became the Lasters' Protective Union of America, until in 1895 it became part of the new Boot and Shoe Workers' Union. In 1893, he served a term as a vice-president of the American Federation of Labor.

Marden was a supporter of the Republican Party, for which he was elected to the Massachusetts House of Representatives in 1895, serving until 1899.

Trade union offices
Preceded by New position	Fourth Vice-President of the American Federation of Labor; 1893–1894	Succeeded by Thomas J. Elderkin
