= Henry D. Humphrey =

American politician

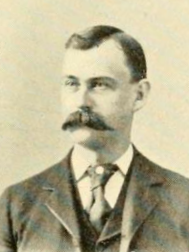
Henry D. Humphrey

Henry Devereux Humphrey (June 20, 1861 – July 7, 1919) was an American businessman and politician who served as treasurer of Norfolk County, Massachusetts from 1907 and serving at least until 1918. He had previously served in the Massachusetts House of Representatives.

He was born in Jamaica Plain into an old Massachusetts family, dating to 17th-century colonist John Humphrey. He died in Dedham on July 7, 1919.
