= 1892 Massachusetts legislature =

113th Massachusetts General Court
←	112th	114th	→

Overview
- Legislative body: General Court
- Election: November 3, 1891

Senate
- Members: 40
- President: Alfred S. Pinkerton
- Party control: Split (20–20)

House
- Members: 240
- Speaker: William Emerson Barrett
- Party control: Republican

Sessions
- 1st: January 6, 1892 – June 17, 1892

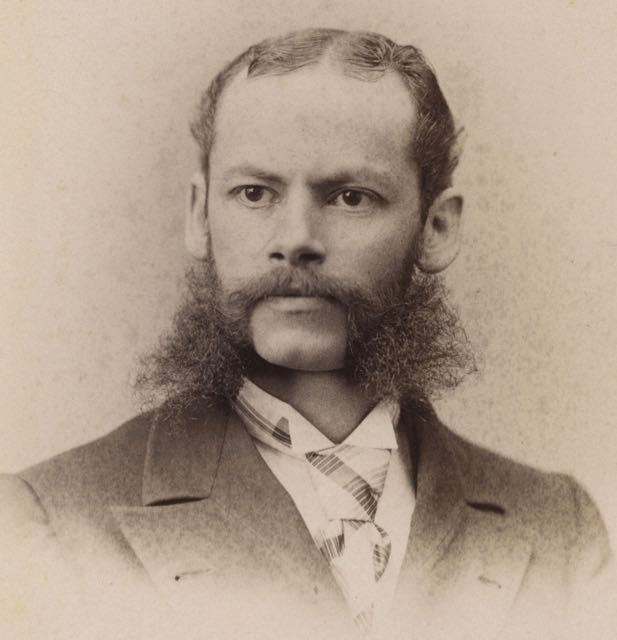
Alfred Pinkerton, Senate president.

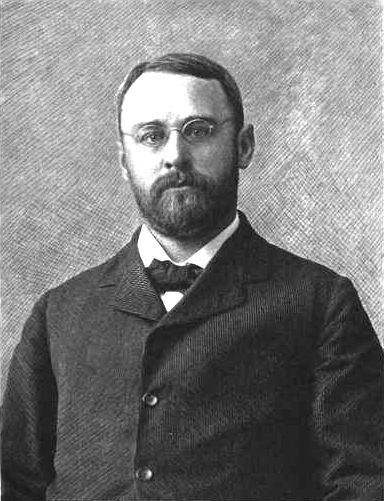
William Emerson Barrett, House speaker.

Leaders of the Massachusetts General Court, 1892.

The 113th Massachusetts General Court, consisting of the Massachusetts Senate and the Massachusetts House of Representatives, met in 1892 during the governorship of William E. Russell. Alfred S. Pinkerton served as president of the Senate and William Emerson Barrett served as speaker of the House.

== Senators ==
image	name	date of birth	district
	Francis P. Arnold	February 21, 1836	
	Charles H. Baker	February 2, 1847	
	William M. Butler	January 29, 1861	
	William Henry Carberry	February 22, 1851	
	Richard A. Carter	February 16, 1862	
	Arthur B. Champlin	February 7, 1858	
	Wilder Philander Clark	October 12, 1832	
	John William Coveney	April 10, 1845	
	Luther Dame	March 3, 1826	
	John E. Drury	May 11, 1852	
	William N. Eaton	December 29, 1845	
	B. Marvin Fernald	February 14, 1847	
	Gorham D. Gilman	May 29, 1822	
	Stephen A. Hickox	May 20, 1839	
	Robert Howard	February 8, 1845	
	P. J. Kennedy	January 14, 1858	
	Henry Albert Kimball	May 3, 1842	
	James W. McDonald	May 15, 1857	
	Michael J. McEttrick	June 22, 1848	
	William S. McNary	March 29, 1863	
	William E. Meade	August 2, 1839	
	Christopher Columbus Merritt	September 29, 1830	
	Edward Mott	June 19, 1830	
	George K. Nichols	April 10, 1827	
	Isaac Newton Nutter	June 23, 1836	
	Henry Parkman	May 23, 1850	
	Alfred Stamm Pinkerton	March 19, 1856	
	William Provin	February 14, 1842	
	William F. Ray	March 2, 1854	
	Francis Henry Raymond	February 19, 1836	
	John Read	May 19, 1840	
	John Reade	December 1, 1826	
	Edward Payson Shaw	September 1, 1841	
	John Simpkins	June 27, 1862	
	Sidney P. Smith	July 13, 1850	
	Benjamin Franklin Southwick	July 5, 1835	
	Eben S. Stevens	December 11, 1846	
	John R. Thayer	March 9, 1845	
	William H. West	January 27, 1830	
	Edwin F. Wyer	September 28, 1832	

== Representatives ==
image	name	date of birth	district
	Edward W. Ackley	April 16, 1838	
	John William Adams	June 20, 1828	
	James E. Allen	February 19, 1841	
	Stephen Anderson	December 24, 1840	
	Miles S. Andrews	January 17, 1855	
	Francis H. Appleton	June 17, 1847	
	Henry W. Ashley	February 16, 1855	
	E. Elbridge Atwood	March 8, 1842	
	Edward B. Atwood	May 13, 1845	
	James Lewis Austin	March 19, 1851	
	Charles M. Bacheller	June 29, 1863	
	William G. Baker	June 9, 1845	
	George S. Ball	May 22, 1822	
	Henry D. Bardwell	October 24, 1856	
	Benjamin B. Barney	January 25, 1868	
	Richard F. Barrett	August 4, 1848	
	William Emerson Barrett	December 29, 1858	
	Hiram W. Barrows	January 19, 1834	
	Thomas Barstow	April 26, 1850	
	Lewis H. Bartlett	April 2, 1854	
	Robert G. Bartlett	April 8, 1834	
	Henry C. Batcheller	September 5, 1830	
	Jacob P. Bates	April 7, 1843	
	David W. Battles	January 20, 1854	
	Frank P. Bennett	May 2, 1853	
	Eugene A. Bessom	June 11, 1855	
	Zechariah L. Bicknell	June 20, 1820	
	S. Stillman Blanchard	June 23, 1835	
	Frederic Wright Bliss	October 14, 1852	
	Albert G. Blodgett	September 2, 1841	
	Percival Blodgett	July 18, 1841	
	Franklin C. Bourne	November 3, 1827	
	Daniel F. Breen	June 7, 1860	
	Edward S. Brewer	June 13, 1846	
	William Hartwell Brigham	February 1, 1863	
	Lemuel M. Brock	November 6, 1837	
	Patrick F. Brogan	January 3, 1862	
	Benjamin F. Brown	February 23, 1834	
	Samuel J. Brown	October 2, 1835	
	Charles H. Bryant	May 28, 1854	
	Anson Buck	May 3, 1839	
	William P. Buckley	August 15, 1859	
	Roland E. Burbank	June 1, 1852	
	James F. Burke	November 2, 1861	
	Lewis Burnham	April 23, 1844	
	William Cannon	November 15, 1829	
	Robert P. Capen	May 6, 1824	
	Michael Carroll	July 11, 1849	
	James H. Carter	November 16, 1832	
	Thomas M. Carter	July 17, 1832	
	Joseph J. Casey	December 25, 1863	
	Charles J. Chance	December 19, 1857	
	Salem D. Charles	March 19, 1850	
	Dwight Chester	March 2, 1835	
	Edward P. Clark	December 4, 1854	
	Hiram E. W. Clark	April 15, 1835	
	Louis M. Clark	December 14, 1858	
	Horace E. Clayton	1854	
	George S. Clough	May 2, 1839	
	Daniel H. Coakley	December 10, 1865	
	Clarence G. Coburn	January 15, 1850	
	Francis Connolly	March 4, 1849	
	George A. Crane	June 4, 1837	
	James Prince Crosby	August 15, 1835	
	Charles Crosman	December 27, 1839	
	Elkanah Crowell	February 2, 1829	
	Jeremiah J. Crowley	1852	
	George Edward Cutler	August 22, 1824	
	Charles M. Dacey	August 7, 1863	
	Edward L. Daley	October 6, 1855	
	John Morton Danforth	1840	
	Patrick Delaney	April 26, 1852	
	William D. Dennis	October 11, 1847	
	Edgar Simon Dodge	October 21, 1853	
	William J. Dolan	November 4, 1864	
	Eben S. Dole	August 8, 1847	
	John A. Driscoll	June 13, 1860	
	William B. Durant	September 29, 1844	
	Perlie A. Dyar	March 26, 1857	
	John Norman Easland	March 13, 1855	
	Edward Fairbanks	November 20, 1836	
	George Fall	October 30, 1850	
	James O. Fallon	March 16, 1840	
	James M. Fay	March 23, 1847	
	Myron J. Ferren	August 16, 1836	
	Granville C. Fiske	August 21, 1845	
	Joseph Henry Fletcher	September 26, 1844	
	Frank W. Francis	September 16, 1857	
	Russell M. French	April 22, 1850	
	George H. Friend	December 3, 1846	
	George A. Galloupe	October 28, 1850	
	William W. Gallup	January 29, 1824	
	Arthur H. Gardner	August 4, 1854	
	George H. Garfield	July 18, 1858	
	Edwin H. George	May 2, 1858	
	Michael B. Gilbride	February 13, 1866	
	Joseph J. Giles	March 24, 1842	
	Frederick H. Gillett	October 16, 1851	
	Ransom W. Gillett	November 27, 1847	
	John Golding	1849	
	John R. Graham	December 19, 1847	
	Joshua S. Gray	August 16, 1840	
	George Henry Bartlett Green	December 15, 1845	
	Charles H. Hale	January 11, 1851	
	Henry Clay Hall	1838	
	Dennis E. Halley	May 26, 1863	
	Nathan F. Harding	November 3, 1843	
	Charles Edward Harris	1852	
	William H. Hart	March 28, 1864	
	Joseph B. Heald	March 18, 1850	
	Lemuel Healy	September 23, 1835	
	Edward J. Heffernan	November 4, 1858	
	Patrick J. Heffernin	1856	
	William H. Hemenway	December 28, 1846	
	Thomas David Hevey	August 14, 1846	
	John Franklin Hinds	May 1, 1819	
	John J. Hoar	June 1, 1864	
	Charles H. Hobson	June 20, 1857	
	Charles H. Hooker	September 14, 1850	
	John Hopewell Jr.	February 2, 1845	
	Everett S. Horton	June 15, 1836	
	George C. Howard	October 2, 1860	
	Simeon Augustus Howe	July 2, 1839	
	Warren Hoyt	January 4, 1843	
	William S. Hyde	June 20, 1838	
	Charles T. Jackson	August 13, 1837	
	Robert B. Jenkins	September 16, 1837	
	George W. Jenks	January 14, 1840	
	Henry J. Jennings	November 25, 1829	
	Henry J. Jennison	June 8, 1842	
	Gilbert L. Jewett	December 22, 1839	
	Edgar E. Jordan	October 4, 1844	
	Thomas J. Keliher	October 13, 1858	
	Charles Aloysius Kelly	April 7, 1858	
	Richard G. Kilduff	July 1, 1854	
	Charles H. Kohlrausch Jr.	August 6, 1848	
	James A. Lakin	1841	
	Howard G. Lane	December 15, 1850	
	Andrew M. Lanigan	July 10, 1860	
	Erastus D. Larkin	1835	
	Amos A. Lawrence	November 3, 1847	
	William B. Lawrence	November 15, 1856	
	Mahlon Rich Leonard	January 8, 1836	
	Stephen R. Lincoln	February 1, 1845	
	John C. Loud	July 26, 1844	
	Joseph L. Lougee	December 3, 1836	
	Emery M. Low	March 29, 1859	
	William W. Lowe	February 7, 1834	
	Patrick B. Luby	1859	
	William Luther	April 2, 1833	
	Edwin Francis Lyford	September 8, 1857	
	John B. Lynch	April 13, 1858	
	Cornelius E. Mahoney	January 17, 1858	
	Frank McAnally	November 29, 1855	
	Samuel W. McCall	February 28, 1851	
	Daniel McCarthy	July 1, 1856	
	John W. McEvoy	July 8, 1865	
	Isaac McLean	March 3, 1841	
	John T. McLoughlin	June 2, 1865	
	Richard F. McSolla	January 27, 1855	
	James F. Melaven	November 19, 1858	
	James H. Mellen	November 7, 1845	
	Marcus M. Merritt	April 1, 1839	
	George von Lengerke Meyer	June 24, 1858	
	Horace E. Miller	May 23, 1849	
	William L. Mooney	February 16, 1867	
	Eugene Michael Moriarty	April 15, 1849	
	Stillman F. Morse	November 23, 1857	
	Richard Newell	April 17, 1839	
	DeWitt C. Nichols	August 13, 1846	
	Osborn Nickerson	May 25, 1846	
	John H. Norton	June 9, 1839	
	Andrew L. Nourse	January 24, 1842	
	Arthur F. Nutting	February 4, 1861	
	Charles H. Nye	December 9, 1821	
	John J. O'Brien	June 11, 1862	
	Eugene J. O'Neil	February 29, 1856	
	William H. Oakes	January 24, 1857	
	James M. Olmstead	February 6, 1852	
	Bowdoin Strong Parker	August 10, 1841	
	James Orlando Parker	November 22, 1827	
	Wellington Evarts Parkhurst	January 19, 1835	
	Augustus G. Perkins	June 20, 1846	
	George W. Perkins	July 1, 1842	
	Samuel A. Potter	September 2, 1850	
	Wilbur Howard Powers	January 22, 1849	
	Amasa Pratt	July 28, 1842	
	Edward W. Presho	May 29, 1859	
	George O. Proctor	February 23, 1847	
	Thomas A. Quinn	1858	
	Timothy F. Quinn	December 27, 1863	
	Franklin F. Read	June 14, 1827	
	Albert W. Richardson	August 28, 1854	
	Arthur C. Richardson	October 31, 1837	
	Jeremiah T. Richmond	March 24, 1829	
	Silas P. Richmond	June 19, 1831	
	Malcolm E. Rideout	June 9, 1851	
	George Robert Russell Rivers	May 28, 1853	
	Henry Franklin Rockwell	September 9, 1849	
	Alfred Seelye Roe	June 8, 1844	
	Isaac Rosnosky	November 6, 1846	
	Samuel Ross	February 2, 1865	
	George H. Rugg	January 14, 1825	
	Henry E. Ruggles	July 25, 1858	
	J. Bradford Sargent	June 14, 1859	
	Patrick J. Savage	February 26, 1863	
	Ira O. Sawyer	January 16, 1838	
	Samuel L. Sawyer	June 20, 1845	
	Charles Francis Shute	June 17, 1838	
	George R. Simonds	April 2, 1852	
	James B. Smith	October 1, 1828	
	Sumner Smith	August 21, 1825	
	Sylvanus Smith	March 10, 1829	
	George L. Soule	March 25, 1832	
	Henry C. Sparhawk	February 19, 1865	
	Charles F. Sprague	June 10, 1857	
	Thomas E. St. John	March 2, 1831	
	Clarence Stickney	July 12, 1849	
	Benjamin J. Sullivan	June 12, 1856	
	Michael F. Sullivan	September 21, 1859	
	John F. Sundberg	October 15, 1860	
	Andrew H. Sweet	October 2, 1845	
	Henry Gordon Taft	1836	
	Daniel P. Toomey	March 16, 1861	
	George F. Tucker	January 19, 1852	
	Edward E. Turner	April 15, 1837	
	Bentley W. Warren	April 20, 1864	
	Arthur Holbrook Wellman	October 30, 1855	
	N. Emery Whitcomb	April 11, 1836	
	Fred N. Wier	July 4, 1861	
	Aaron O. Wilder	August 4, 1833	
	George S. Winslow	April 6, 1829	
	Bernard M. Wolf	February 17, 1862	
	Frank C. Wood	September 20, 1849	
	Benjamin Herbert Woodsum	October 4, 1857	
	Amos P. Woodward	December 23, 1837	

== See also ==
- 52nd United States Congress
- List of Massachusetts General Courts
