= 1891 Massachusetts legislature =

112th Massachusetts General Court
←	111th	113th	→

Overview
- Legislative body: General Court
- Election: November 4, 1890

Senate
- Members: 40
- President: Henry H. Sprague
- Party control: Republican

House
- Members: 240
- Speaker: William Emerson Barrett
- Party control: Republican

Sessions
- 1st: January 7, 1891 – June 11, 1891

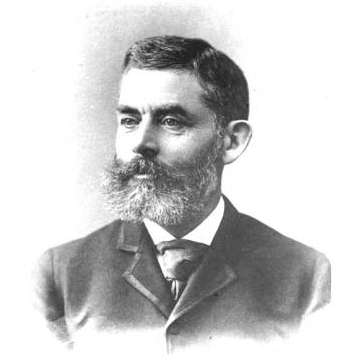
Henry Sprague, Senate president.

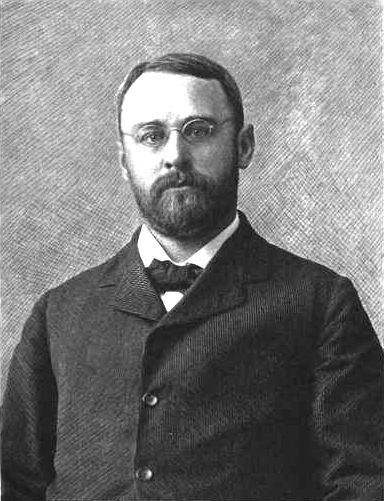
William Barrett, House speaker.

Leaders of the Massachusetts General Court, 1891.

The 112th Massachusetts General Court, consisting of the Massachusetts Senate and the Massachusetts House of Representatives, met in 1891 during the governorship of William E. Russell. Henry H. Sprague served as president of the Senate and William Emerson Barrett served as speaker of the House.

== Senators ==
image	name	date of birth	district
	Thomas Alden	August 17, 1827	
	Joseph Bennett	May 26, 1840	
	Joseph Mathias Bradley	August 18, 1852	
	Arthur Butler Breed	June 30, 1857	
	Benjamin F. Brickett	April 10, 1846	
	Hiram Torrey Cady	January 17, 1843	
	Frank E. Carpenter	August 29, 1851	
	Arthur B. Champlin	February 7, 1858	
	Wilder Philander Clark	October 12, 1832	
	George P. Cooke	October 28, 1849	
	John William Coveney	April 10, 1845	
	James Donovan	May 28, 1859	
	John E. Drury	May 11, 1852	
	William N. Eaton	December 29, 1845	
	B. Marvin Fernald	February 14, 1847	
	Gorham D. Gilman	May 29, 1822	
	Charles Haggerty	December 6, 1854	
	Robert Howard	February 8, 1845	
	Horace G. Kemp	August 19, 1849	
	Henry Albert Kimball	May 3, 1842	
	Aaron Low	August 11, 1833	
	James W. McDonald	May 15, 1857	
	William S. McNary	March 29, 1863	
	Isaac Newton Nutter	June 23, 1836	
	Alfred Stamm Pinkerton	March 19, 1856	
	William Provin	February 14, 1842	
	Francis Henry Raymond	February 19, 1836	
	John Reade	December 1, 1826	
	Frederick S. Risteen	August 28, 1840	
	Morgan Rotch	April 8, 1848	
	Cyrus Savage	September 2, 1832	
	John Simpkins	June 27, 1862	
	Sidney P. Smith	July 13, 1850	
	Benjamin Franklin Southwick	July 5, 1835	
	Henry H. Sprague	August 1, 1841	
	William Stopford	February 22, 1848	
	John R. Thayer	March 9, 1845	
	George Makepeace Towle	August 27, 1841	
	William H. West	January 27, 1830	
	Edwin F. Wyer	September 28, 1832	

== Representatives ==
image	name	date of birth	district
	Stephen Anderson	December 24, 1840	
	Francis H. Appleton	June 17, 1847	
	Edward A. Atkins	October 22, 1832	
	James Lewis Austin	March 19, 1851	
	Fitz J. Babson	February 14, 1828	
	Charles M. Bacheller	June 29, 1863	
	Charles H. Baker	February 2, 1847	
	Harry H. Barrett	March 10, 1851	
	Richard F. Barrett	August 4, 1848	
	William Emerson Barrett	December 29, 1858	
	Robert G. Bartlett	April 8, 1834	
	Frank P. Bennett	May 2, 1853	
	Zechariah L. Bicknell	June 20, 1820	
	Ledyard Bill	May 14, 1836	Worcester, District 4
	Henry T. Bingham	March 9, 1839	
	S. Stillman Blanchard	June 23, 1835	
	Frederic Wright Bliss	October 14, 1852	
	Charles H. Boodey	December 27, 1838	
	Daniel F. Breen	June 7, 1860	
	Elmer H. Bright	June 26, 1860	
	Henry W. Britton	February 13, 1851	
	Lemuel M. Brock	November 6, 1837	
	Ethan Brooks	January 10, 1832	
	James L. Brophy	November 14, 1852	
	George H. Brown	September 3, 1838	
	Herman Buchholz	November 23, 1839	
	William P. Buckley	August 15, 1859	
	Andrew J. Bucklin	February 23, 1829	
	Henry Beecher Bullard	April 9, 1839	
	Walter Jesse David Bullock	July 11, 1860	
	James F. Burke	November 2, 1861	
	William M. Butler	January 29, 1861	
	Patrick Cannon	May 2, 1854	
	William Cannon	November 15, 1829	
	Robert P. Capen	May 6, 1824	
	Erastus P. Carpenter	November 23, 1822	
	George N. Carpenter	January 26, 1840	
	Michael Carroll	July 11, 1849	
	James H. Carter	November 16, 1832	
	Richard A. Carter	February 16, 1862	
	Charles J. Chance	December 19, 1857	
	Salem D. Charles	March 19, 1850	
	Dwight Chester	March 2, 1835	
	Daniel R. Child	June 23, 1827	
	James W. Clapp	July 30, 1842	
	Hiram E. W. Clark	April 15, 1835	
	Louis M. Clark	December 14, 1858	
	George E. Clarke	October 30, 1822	
	George S. Clough	May 2, 1839	
	Clarence G. Coburn	January 15, 1850	
	John H. Coffey	1860	
	Morton E. Converse	November 17, 1837	
	Myron L. Corbett	October 28, 1844	
	Jeremiah J. Crowley	1852	
	Francis C. Curtis	March 13, 1836	
	Samuel N. Curtis	June 26, 1824	
	John Morton Danforth	1840	
	Squire S. Davis	November 3, 1852	
	Frederick B. Day	March 20, 1843	
	Henry S. Dewey	1856	
	Henry S. Dickinson	September 26, 1863	
	Perlie A. Dyar	March 26, 1857	
	Nathan Edson	September 16, 1817	
	Edward C. Ellis	May 30, 1848	
	S. Hopkins Emery	August 22, 1815	
	Charles S. Ensign	July 26, 1842	
	John W. Fairbanks	October 12, 1843	
	Nathan H. Fales	January 17, 1847	
	James O. Fallon	March 16, 1840	
	Thomas F. Fallon	December 7, 1857	
	Isaac P. Fears	November 12, 1838	
	Myron J. Ferren	August 16, 1836	
	Elkanah Finney	October 31, 1849	
	Charles T. Fletcher	March 23, 1826	
	Charles W. Flint	May 3, 1827	
	Nathan B. Flood	November 16, 1854	
	Charles A. Frazer	July 4, 1852	
	John A. Gale	November 24, 1848	
	Benjamin Gammons	February 12, 1832	
	Arthur H. Gardner	August 4, 1854	
	Joseph J. Giles	March 24, 1842	
	Frederick H. Gillett	October 16, 1851	
	Edward A. Goddard	1845	
	John Golding	1849	
	David E. Gould	April 14, 1863	
	Edward W. Greene	September 4, 1843	
	Roger Haggerty	1846	
	Henry Clay Hall	1838	
	Aaron C. Handley	October 7, 1823	
	Nathan F. Harding	November 3, 1843	
	Charles H. Harriman	November 16, 1852	
	James A. Hartshorn	February 24, 1856	
	Edward J. Heffernan	November 4, 1858	
	Patrick J. Heffernin	1856	
	Augustus Hemenway	1853	
	Charles W. Henderson	June 3, 1842	
	Edward E. Herrod	November 4, 1857	
	Thomas David Hevey	August 14, 1846	
	Stephen A. Hickox	May 20, 1839	
	Charles E. Hinckley	November 4, 1826	
	John Franklin Hinds	May 1, 1819	
	Charles H. Hobson	June 20, 1857	
	William D. Hodges	March 9, 1854	
	Everett S. Horton	June 15, 1836	
	Squire E. Howard	May 15, 1840	
	Timothy Howard	October 19, 1863	
	Archibald M. Howe	May 20, 1848	
	Edward C. Howe	August 9, 1847	
	Simeon Augustus Howe	July 2, 1839	
	Amos Hunting	April 12, 1835	
	John T. Hurley	October 26, 1855	
	Isaac P. Hutchinson	February 26, 1860	
	Robert B. Jenkins	September 16, 1837	
	Henry H. Johnson	March 24, 1840	
	Myron H. Judd	October 19, 1848	
	Thomas J. Keliher	October 13, 1858	
	Charles Aloysius Kelly	April 7, 1858	
	Parker J. Kemp	June 2, 1847	
	John Kenrick Jr.	October 25, 1857	
	Charles G. Keyes	October 19, 1832	
	Frederick M. Kilmer	February 8, 1852	
	John W. Kimball	February 27, 1828	
	Albert C. Kirby	March 17, 1841	
	Francis W. Kittredge	June 4, 1843	
	George K. Knowlton	July 8, 1840	
	James W. Knox	June 12, 1836	
	Nathaniel W. Ladd	January 7, 1848	
	James A. Lakin	1841	
	Hiram B. Lane	August 17, 1824	
	Howard G. Lane	December 15, 1850	
	Henry W. Langdon	December 7, 1847	
	Andrew M. Lanigan	July 10, 1860	
	William B. Lawrence	November 15, 1856	
	Horace G. Leslie	April 13, 1842	
	James A. Lewis	May 20, 1834	
	Joseph P. Lomasney	March 10, 1863	
	Henry C. Longley	January 9, 1841	
	Lucien Lord	October 11, 1840	
	John C. Loud	July 26, 1844	
	Patrick B. Luby	1859	
	Haile R. Luther	February 7, 1838	
	John B. Lynch	April 13, 1858	
	Cornelius E. Mahoney	January 17, 1858	
	Dudley J. Marston	July 21, 1843	
	Ulysses Everett Mayhew	August 16, 1848	
	Frank McAnally	November 29, 1855	
	Daniel McCarthy	July 1, 1856	
	Peter J. McDonald	May 3, 1860	
	Thomas O. McEnaney	October 23, 1857	
	Michael J. McEttrick	June 22, 1848	
	Herbert A. McFarland	April 14, 1840	
	John McFethries	1830	
	George B. McKenna	August 31, 1857	
	Isaac McLean	March 3, 1841	
	John T. McLoughlin	June 2, 1865	
	Jeremiah J. McNamara	December 5, 1864	
	Richard F. McSolla	January 27, 1855	
	William E. Meade	August 2, 1839	
	James H. Mellen	November 7, 1845	
	Michael J. Mitchell	July 29, 1855	
	Hiram A. Monk	July 16, 1829	
	William L. Mooney	February 16, 1867	
	Charles Moore	June 13, 1831	
	Louis E. P. Moreau	February 25, 1857	
	Eugene Michael Moriarty	April 15, 1849	
	Edward Mott	June 19, 1830	
	Michael Joseph Murray	June 18, 1867	
	Charles Baxter Newell	October 3, 1839	
	Arthur F. Nutting	February 4, 1861	
	John J. O'Brien	June 11, 1862	
	John O'Brien	October 1, 1855	
	Eugene J. O'Neil	February 29, 1856	
	William H. Oakes	January 24, 1857	
	James M. Olmstead	February 6, 1852	
	James Orlando Parker	November 22, 1827	
	Wellington Evarts Parkhurst	January 19, 1835	
	Alonzo Penney	September 23, 1835	
	George W. Perkins	July 1, 1842	
	Benjamin F. Peterson	October 11, 1836	
	Benjamin P. Pickering	February 22, 1844	
	John M. Plummer	April 1, 1843	
	John P. Pomeroy	August 26, 1836	
	Wilbur Howard Powers	January 22, 1849	
	Amasa Pratt	July 28, 1842	
	Edward W. Presho	May 29, 1859	
	John E. O. Prouty	March 8, 1840	
	Josiah Quincy	October 15, 1859	
	Patrick James Quinn	June 4, 1843	
	Andrew J. Rady	May 1, 1853	
	Patrick H. Raftery	July 17, 1856	
	James Ramage	1836	
	Franklin F. Read	June 14, 1827	
	James Reid	March 5, 1824	
	William H. Rice	1841	
	Albert W. Richardson	August 28, 1854	
	Arthur C. Richardson	October 31, 1837	
	Malcolm E. Rideout	June 9, 1851	
	Samuel E. Ripley	June 17, 1845	
	Isaac Rosnosky	November 6, 1846	
	John J. Salter	January 11, 1856	
	Patrick J. Savage	February 26, 1863	
	Samuel L. Sawyer	June 20, 1845	
	Charles F. Shaw	November 28, 1840	
	Ebenezer Shaw	August 24, 1825	
	Charles S. Smith	December 16, 1828	
	Elvin L. Smith	January 30, 1851	
	William D. Sohier	October 22, 1858	
	Henry C. Sparhawk	February 19, 1865	
	Charles F. Sprague	June 10, 1857	
	William H. Stearns	April 11, 1850	
	William S. Stevens	June 13, 1859	
	Michael F. Sullivan	September 21, 1859	
	George N. Swallow	January 2, 1854	
	Henry Gordon Taft	1836	
	Harrison O. Thomas	June 28, 1840	
	Edwin D. Thompson	August 26, 1848	
	Lysander Thurston	May 25, 1837	
	Edwin A. Tibbetts	April 24, 1840	
	Charles A. Tilden	March 23, 1835	
	Frank B. Tilton	March 15, 1840	
	George F. Tucker	January 19, 1852	
	Charles W. Turner	June 28, 1828	
	Henry Edward Turner	May 4, 1842	
	William H. H. Tuttle	August 17, 1845	
	Jacob Otis Wardwell	March 14, 1857	
	Bentley W. Warren	April 20, 1864	
	Eben C. Waterman	March 1, 1840	
	Thomas Weston	September 23, 1826	
	Barney T. Wetherell	1822	
	Henry C. Wheaton	May 25, 1839	
	Franklin B. White	1837	
	Edwin Whitney	November 1, 1835	
	Fred N. Wier	July 4, 1861	
	Aaron O. Wilder	August 4, 1833	
	Hezekiah W. Williams	May 16, 1833	
	William Power Wilson	November 15, 1852	
	Nathan N. Withington	March 9, 1828	
	Benjamin Herbert Woodsum	October 4, 1857	
	Charles F. Worcester	February 25, 1859	
	William J. Wright	1846	

== See also ==
- 52nd United States Congress
- List of Massachusetts General Courts
