= 1893 Massachusetts legislature =

114th Massachusetts General Court
←	113th	115th	→

Overview
- Legislative body: General Court
- Election: November 8, 1892

Senate
- Members: 40
- President: Alfred S. Pinkerton
- Party control: Republican

House
- Members: 240
- Speaker: William Emerson Barrett
- Party control: Republican

Sessions
- 1st: January 4, 1893 – June 9, 1893

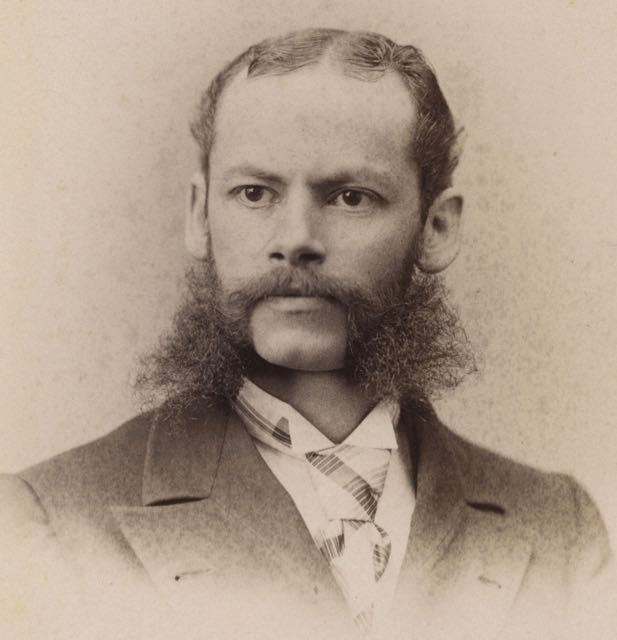
Alfred Pinkerton, Senate president.

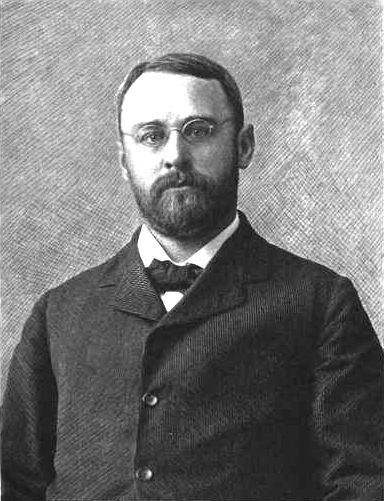
William Barrett, House speaker.

Leaders of the Massachusetts General Court, 1893.

The 114th Massachusetts General Court, consisting of the Massachusetts Senate and the Massachusetts House of Representatives, met in 1893 during the governorship of William E. Russell. Alfred S. Pinkerton served as president of the Senate and William Emerson Barrett served as speaker of the House.

== Senators ==
image	name	date of birth	district
	Francis P. Arnold	February 21, 1836	
	Charles H. Baker	February 2, 1847	
	Herbert L. Baker	August 9, 1859	
	Joseph F. Bartlett	July 25, 1843	
	Francis T. Berry	August 18, 1849	
	Charles F. Brown	October 21, 1848	
	William P. Buckley	August 15, 1859	
	Albert S. Burnham	September 25, 1850	
	William M. Butler	January 29, 1861	
	Richard A. Carter	February 16, 1862	
	Maurice F. Coughlin	December 29, 1856	
	Solomon F. Cushman	November 18, 1826	
	Luther Dame	March 3, 1826	
	John Henry Dee	May 13, 1842	
	John F. Fitzgerald	February 11, 1863	
	George Henry Bartlett Green	December 15, 1845	
	Stephen A. Hickox	May 20, 1839	
	Everett S. Horton	June 15, 1836	
	Robert Howard	February 8, 1845	
	P. J. Kennedy	January 14, 1858	
	John Kenrick Jr.	October 25, 1857	
	Henry Albert Kimball	May 3, 1842	
	Francis W. Kittredge	June 4, 1843	
	William B. Lawrence	November 15, 1856	
	Frederick Lawton	May 10, 1852	
	Edward Joseph Leary	May 27, 1860	
	John Flint Merrill	January 16, 1849	
	Henry S. Milton	September 28, 1855	
	Hiram A. Monk	July 16, 1829	
	George K. Nichols	April 10, 1827	
	Henry Parkman	May 23, 1850	
	Alfred Stamm Pinkerton	March 19, 1856	
	Abraham C. Ratshesky	November 6, 1864	
	William F. Ray	March 2, 1854	
	John Read	May 19, 1840	
	Stephen Salisbury III	March 31, 1835	
	Samuel L. Sawyer	June 20, 1845	
	Edward Payson Shaw	September 1, 1841	
	Elisha H. Shaw	September 29, 1847	
	Eben S. Stevens	December 11, 1846	

== Representatives ==
image	name	date of birth	district
	John E. Abbott	November 30, 1845	
	Edward W. Ackley	April 16, 1838	
	John William Adams	June 20, 1828	
	John Clark Alden	April 4, 1836	
	James E. Allen	February 19, 1841	
	Stephen Anderson	December 24, 1840	
	Henry W. Ashley	February 16, 1855	
	Edward B. Atwood	May 13, 1845	
	Henry Page Austin	August 28, 1836	
	John Edward Bacon	1837	
	James S. Barnes	January 11, 1830	
	William Emerson Barrett	December 29, 1858	
	Lewis H. Bartlett	April 2, 1854	
	Nathaniel C. Bartlett	June 22, 1858	
	Henry C. Batcheller	September 5, 1830	
	Herbert C. Bayrd	November 3, 1851	
	Amos Beckford	March 13, 1828	
	Frank P. Bennett	May 2, 1853	
	Eugene A. Bessom	June 11, 1855	
	Frederic Wright Bliss	October 14, 1852	
	Edward F. Blodgett	August 9, 1848	
	Benjamin Chapman Brainard	May 19, 1841	
	Edward S. Brewer	June 13, 1846	
	William Hartwell Brigham	February 1, 1863	
	Patrick F. Brogan	January 3, 1862	
	Thomas A. Brooks	December 22, 1858	
	Benjamin F. Brown	February 23, 1834	
	John Brown	1843	
	Robert C. Brown	November 5, 1867	
	Charles H. Bryant	May 28, 1854	
	Frank L. Buck	August 18, 1850	
	George H. Buck	March 31, 1843	
	Henry Elias Bullard	August 18, 1847	
	Lewis Burnham	April 23, 1844	
	Allen Francis Carpenter	February 28, 1842	
	Thomas Carroll	January 14, 1839	
	Salem D. Charles	March 19, 1850	
	Dwight Chester	March 2, 1835	
	John A. Clark	June 16, 1834	
	Daniel H. Coakley	December 10, 1865	
	Henry H. Collamore	February 3, 1841	
	Edward Issachar Comins	November 16, 1833	
	Francis Connolly	March 4, 1849	
	Marcus C. Cook	March 14, 1827	
	Charles H. Crane	May 8, 1845	
	George A. Crane	June 4, 1837	
	Myron D. Cressy	October 30, 1851	
	Samuel Crooks	December 17, 1821	
	James Prince Crosby	August 15, 1835	
	Elkanah Crowell	February 2, 1829	
	Jeremiah J. Crowley	1852	
	Arthur B. Curtis	November 30, 1854	
	George Edward Cutler	August 22, 1824	
	Charles M. Dacey	August 7, 1863	
	Francis W. Darling	December 16, 1852	
	Patrick Delaney	April 26, 1852	
	William D. Dennis	October 11, 1847	
	James H. Derbyshire	June 11, 1855	
	John G. Dexter	February 28, 1834	
	Edgar Simon Dodge	October 21, 1853	
	Phineas A. Dodge	May 30, 1840	
	William J. Dolan	November 4, 1864	
	Eben S. Dole	August 8, 1847	
	Edward James Donahue	December 27, 1862	
	Roger P. Donoghue	May 18, 1861	
	William J. Donovan	October 31, 1862	
	Moses S. Douglas	March 21, 1837	
	James H. Doyle	June 17, 1867	
	John Norman Easland	March 13, 1855	
	George Morton Eddy	August 5, 1843	
	George A. Elder	May 13, 1858	
	Chesselden L. Ellis	March 17, 1846	
	Ralph W. Ellis	November 25, 1856	
	Edward James Harris Estabrooks	April 16, 1841	
	Joseph Byron Farley	October 10, 1847	
	Philip J. Farley	January 3, 1864	
	Charles Favreau	January 31, 1851	
	George Almerin Fleming	March 20, 1850	
	Samuel A. Fletcher	July 13, 1836	
	Silas Augustus Forbush	May 23, 1823	
	Ether S. Foss	June 10, 1834	
	Charles William French	October 31, 1854	
	George H. Friend	December 3, 1846	
	Edward Everett Fuller	May 25, 1839	
	Granville Austin Fuller	March 13, 1837	
	Alvin Aaron Gage	October 2, 1841	
	George A. Galloupe	October 28, 1850	
	George H. Garfield	July 18, 1858	
	Michael B. Gilbride	February 13, 1866	
	Edward Winslow Gleason	September 5, 1853	
	James F. Gleason	August 8, 1862	
	Samuel S. Gleason	May 1, 1842	
	John Golding	1849	
	John R. Graham	December 19, 1847	
	William H. Granger	June 28, 1838	
	Joshua S. Gray	August 16, 1840	
	Moses P. Greenwood	December 21, 1845	
	John Haigh	November 17, 1839	
	Henry Clay Hall	1838	
	Dennis E. Halley	May 26, 1863	
	Charles L. Hammond	September 1, 1860	
	Clarke Partridge Harding	June 20, 1853	
	Charles Edward Harris	1852	
	James A. Hartshorn	February 24, 1856	
	Fredric W. Hathaway	March 6, 1836	
	James E. Hayes	August 10, 1865	
	Richard J. Hayes	October 4, 1861	
	William Henry Irving Hayes	June 21, 1848	
	Edward B. Hayward	November 8, 1861	
	William E. Hayward	July 19, 1839	
	George C. Higgins	November 19, 1845	
	John J. Hoar	June 1, 1864	
	Charles H. Holmes	October 4, 1859	
	Warren Hoyt	January 4, 1843	
	Lucius Hunt	May 26, 1839	
	Isaiah Hutchins	September 23, 1829	
	Charles T. Jackson	August 13, 1837	
	Henry J. Jennings	November 25, 1829	
	Gilbert L. Jewett	December 22, 1839	
	Fred Joy	July 8, 1859	
	Joseph J. Kelley	February 22, 1868	
	Daniel J. Kinnaly	May 8, 1855	
	Arthur Shimmin Kneil	May 6, 1861	
	Charles H. Kohlrausch, Jr.	August 6, 1848	
	James Cushing Leach	June 11, 1831	
	Frank Leighton	June 17, 1848	
	Mahlon Rich Leonard	January 8, 1836	
	Joseph B. Lincoln	July 3, 1837	
	Oliver C. Livermore	July 21, 1838	
	Joseph L. Lougee	December 3, 1836	
	George E. Lovett	February 27, 1849	
	Emery M. Low	March 29, 1859	
	William W. Lowe	February 7, 1834	
	Edwin Francis Lyford	September 8, 1857	
	Albert E. Lynch	July 4, 1867	
	John J. Mahoney	April 13, 1860	
	Dana Malone	October 8, 1857	
	Albert W. Martin	December 2, 1851	
	William P. Martin	July 30, 1858	
	Jeremiah Justin McCarthy	March 29, 1852	
	John W. McEvoy	July 8, 1865	
	William Henry McInerney	March 17, 1866	
	Hugh McLaughlin	April 18, 1852	
	John T. McLoughlin	June 2, 1865	
	William Henry McMorrow	March 23, 1871	
	Michael J. Meagher	1845	
	James F. Melaven	November 19, 1858	
	James H. Mellen	November 7, 1845	
	Matthew H. Merriam	August 16, 1824	
	Oliver B. Merrill	January 11, 1836	
	George von Lengerke Meyer	June 24, 1858	
	Edwin Child Miller	December 1, 1857	
	William Moore	October 22, 1835	
	Eugene Michael Moriarty	April 15, 1849	
	John Milton Morin	February 14, 1828	
	Charles Otis Morrill	February 10, 1851	
	Gardner S. Morse	1837	
	Daniel Murphy	September 25, 1843	
	James Stuart Murphy	September 5, 1860	
	John L. Murphy	May 8, 1863	
	James J. Myers	November 20, 1842	
	John B. Newhall	October 1, 1862	
	Augustus Manning Nickerson	March 15, 1846	
	Arthur F. Nutting	February 4, 1861	
	Charles H. Nye	December 9, 1821	
	Michael J. O'Brien	November 9, 1855	
	Eugene J. O'Neil	February 29, 1856	
	Bowdoin Strong Parker	August 10, 1841	
	Wellington Evarts Parkhurst	January 19, 1835	
	John E. Parry	July 3, 1854	
	Augustus G. Perkins	June 20, 1846	
	Esek H. Pierce	January 25, 1830	
	Burrill Porter	February 22, 1832	
	Charles Potter	June 24, 1830	
	Samuel A. Potter	September 2, 1850	
	John Jacob Prevaux	March 16, 1857	
	George O. Proctor	February 23, 1847	
	John Quinn, Jr.	December 16, 1859	
	Thomas A. Quinn	1858	
	Timothy F. Quinn	December 27, 1863	
	Hobart Raymond	September 25, 1846	
	Franklin F. Read	June 14, 1827	
	Abner Rice	February 28, 1820	
	Thomas Williams Rich	August 6, 1840	
	Clarence E. Richardson	May 13, 1847	
	John S. Richardson	August 25, 1855	
	Robert A. Richardson	1840	
	Jeremiah T. Richmond	March 24, 1829	
	George Edwin Ricker	July 22, 1839	
	Malcolm E. Rideout	June 9, 1851	
	George Robert Russell Rivers	May 28, 1853	
	Royal Robbins	December 12, 1865	
	Henry Franklin Rockwell	September 9, 1849	
	Alfred Seelye Roe	June 8, 1844	
	Isaac Rosnosky	November 6, 1846	
	Samuel Ross	February 2, 1865	
	Charles P. Rugg	August 12, 1827	
	Thomas A. Russell	June 17, 1858	
	Frank Benjamin Schutt	1837	
	Enoch J. Shaw	January 24, 1862	
	George P. Sheldon	December 25, 1857	
	John Sherman	March 15, 1834	
	William Uart Sherwin	May 9, 1851	
	Charles Francis Shute	June 17, 1838	
	Anthony Smalley	March 15, 1836	
	James B. Smith	October 1, 1828	
	Sylvanus Smith	March 10, 1829	
	William Henry Sprague	June 27, 1845	
	Albert W. Sturdy	March 4, 1831	
	Benjamin J. Sullivan	June 12, 1856	
	James J. Sullivan	December 22, 1865	
	Michael F. Sullivan	September 21, 1859	
	Richard Sullivan	February 24, 1856	
	Hiram Taylor	December 16, 1818	
	Eben F. Thompson	January 29, 1859	
	Jabez P. Thompson	July 24, 1853	
	James Atherton Tilden	December 6, 1835	
	Cornelius H. Toland	November 2, 1868	
	Isaac Brownell Tompkins	August 17, 1826	
	Daniel P. Toomey	March 16, 1861	
	William M. Townsend	August 24, 1845	
	Jacob Tucker	December 23, 1835	
	John E. Tuttle	November 3, 1835	
	Charles F. Varnum	June 28, 1846	
	Frederick A. Volk	August 17, 1865	
	Frank Lewis Wadden	April 21, 1847	
	Charles Elliott Wakefield	December 23, 1854	
	Lyman S. Walker	May 9, 1840	
	William A. Warner	April 15, 1837	
	Stephen Cady Warriner	August 25, 1839	
	Arthur Holbrook Wellman	October 30, 1855	
	Frederick W. Whitcomb	September 7, 1863	
	William H. White	September 4, 1858	
	George Whitney	1817	
	Eugene W. Wood	May 10, 1832	
	Frank C. Wood	September 20, 1849	
	Joseph Lucian Woodbury	June 10, 1844	
	Amos P. Woodward	December 23, 1837	
	Albert P. Worthen	September 8, 1861	

== See also ==
- 53rd United States Congress
- List of Massachusetts General Courts
