= 1887 Massachusetts legislature =

108th meeting of the Massachusetts General Court

108th Massachusetts General Court
←	107th	109th	→

Overview
- Legislative body: General Court
- Election: November 2, 1886

Senate
- Members: 40
- President: Halsey J. Boardman
- Party control: Republican

House of Representantives
- Members: 240
- Speaker: Charles J. Noyes
- Party control: Republican

Sessions
- 1st: January 5, 1887 – June 16, 1887

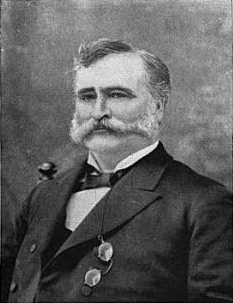
Halsey Boardman, Senate president.

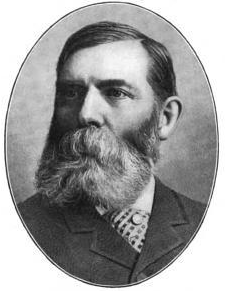
Charles Noyes, House speaker.

Leaders of the Massachusetts General Court, 1887.

The 108th Massachusetts General Court, consisting of the Massachusetts Senate and the Massachusetts House of Representatives, met in 1887 during the governorship of Oliver Ames. Halsey J. Boardman served as president of the Senate and Charles J. Noyes served as speaker of the House.

== Senators ==
- Alpheus B. Alger
- Halsey J. Boardman
- Charles N. Clark
- Benjamin F. Cook
- John J. Currier
- Patrick D. Dwyer
- Oliver G. Fernald
- J. Varnum Fletcher
- William T. Forbes
- Charles A. Gleason
- Jubal C. Gleason
- Edward Glines
- J. Henry Gould
- Harris C. Hartwell
- Robert Howard
- Luman T. Jefts
- Edward J. Jenkins
- Edward D. G. Jones
- Frank W. Jones
- Jediah P. Jordan
- Isaac N. Keith
- Ziba C. Keith
- D. Frank Kimball
- Edwin T. Marble
- Eben C. Milliken
- Elijah A. Morse
- Asa T. Newhall
- Edward F. O'Sullivan
- Levi Perkins
- Henry N. Phillips
- Edwin L. Pilsbury
- Charles A. Reed
- Samuel Roads Jr.
- Irving B. Sayles
- John F. Shea
- Edward J. Slattery
- John K. C. Sleeper
- Charles A. Towne
- John Welch
- Edward P. Wilbur

== Representatives ==
- William Oscar Armstrong
- Isaiah Cole Young

== See also ==
- 50th United States Congress
- List of Massachusetts General Courts
