= 1890 Massachusetts legislature =

111th Massachusetts General Court
←	110th	112th	→

Overview
- Legislative body: General Court
- Election: November 5, 1889

Senate
- Members: 40
- President: Henry H. Sprague
- Party control: Republican

House
- Members: 240
- Speaker: William Emerson Barrett
- Party control: Republican

Sessions
- 1st: January 1, 1890 – July 2, 1890

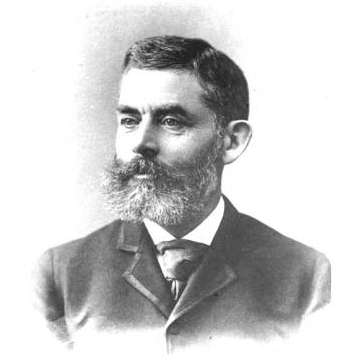
Henry Sprague, Senate president.

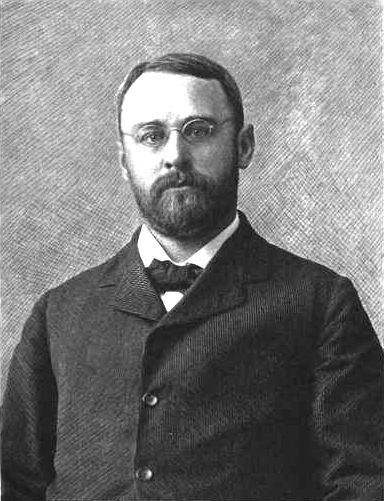
William Barrett, House speaker.

Leaders of the Massachusetts General Court, 1890.

The 111th Massachusetts General Court, consisting of the Massachusetts Senate and the Massachusetts House of Representatives, met in 1890 during the governorship of John Q. A. Brackett. Henry H. Sprague served as president of the Senate and William Emerson Barrett served as speaker of the House.

== Senators ==
Image	Name	Date of birth	District	Party
	Edwin Baker	January 18, 1843	Franklin	
	Joseph Mathias Bradley	August 18, 1852	6th Essex	
	Arthur Butler Breed	June 30, 1857	1st Essex	
	Benjamin F. Campbell	September 12, 1834	1st Suffolk	
	William Henry Carberry	February 22, 1851	8th Suffolk	
	Charles Carleton Coffin	July 26, 1823	7th Suffolk	Republican
	Thomas Washburn Cook	September 15, 1837	3rd Bristol	
	Michael James Creed	August 28, 1856	6th Suffolk	
	William N. Davenport	November 3, 1856	4th Middlesex	Republican
	Simeon Dodge	July 11, 1815	2nd Essex	
	Edward J. Donovan	March 15, 1864	3rd Suffolk	Democratic
	James Donovan	May 28, 1859	4th Suffolk	
	James Fisher Dwinell	July 23, 1825	1st Middlesex	
	Oscar Ely	November 5, 1834	2nd Hampden	
	Alonzo H. Evans	February 24, 1820	6th Middlesex	Republican
	Alfred Swift Fassett	December 5, 1848	Berkshire and Hampshire	
	Lucius Field	August 15, 1840	2nd Worcester	
	David Fisk	May 6, 1838	Cape	
	George Henry Gammans	May 5, 1842	2nd Suffolk	
	Willard Franklin Gleason	December 24, 1846	1st Norfolk	
	William Hobbs Goodwin	October 9, 1822	9th Suffolk	
	Charles Haggerty	December 6, 1854	3rd Worcester	
	James H. Harlow	September 11, 1814	2nd Plymouth	
	George D. Hart	December 7, 1846	5th Essex	
	Henry Joseph Hosmer	February 2, 1832	2nd Middlesex	Republican
	Robert Howard	February 8, 1845	2nd Bristol	
	Freeman Hunt	September 4, 1855	3rd Middlesex	
	Alden Potter Jaques	March 4, 1835	4th Essex	
	Aaron Low	August 11, 1833	3rd Essex	
	Edwin Dickinson Metcalf	March 14, 1848	1st Hampden	
	Hiram Abif Oakman	April 10, 1827	1st Plymouth	
	Moses P. Palmer	May 1, 1830	5th Middlesex	
	Henry Langdon Parker	October 7, 1834	1st Worcester	
	Alfred Stamm Pinkerton	March 19, 1856	4th Worcester	
	Oliver Wells Robbins	August 20, 1812	Berkshire	
	Cyrus Savage	September 2, 1832	1st Bristol	
	Henry H. Sprague	August 1, 1841	5th Suffolk	Republican
	Charles E. Stevens	April 21, 1843	Worcester and Hampshire	
	George Makepeace Towle	August 27, 1841	2nd Norfolk	Republican
	Edward Morton Tucke	May 3, 1840	7th Middlesex	
	Edwin F. Wyer	September 28, 1832		

== Representatives ==
image	Name	Date of birth	District	Town	Party
	Moses C. Adams	November 17, 1843	9th Norfolk	Millis	
	John Albree	March 14, 1829	18th Suffolk	Boston	
	Jared F. Alden	April 18, 1836	8th Plymouth	Middleborough	
	Thomas Alden	August 17, 1827	2nd Plymouth	Duxbury	
	Jesse Allen	May 23, 1847	5th Worcester	Oakham	
	Richard B. Allen	January 25, 1859	25th Middlesex	Lowell	
	Charles H. Baker	February 2, 1847	18th Essex	Lynn	Republican
	William G. Baker	June 9, 1845	23rd Suffolk	Boston	
	Talcott Bancroft	December 24, 1821	2nd Hampshire	Chesterfield	
	Thomas E. Barker	March 13, 1839	9th Middlesex	Malden	
	Franklin O. Barnes	November 11, 1841	26th Suffolk	Chelsea	Republican
	William Emerson Barrett	December 29, 1858	11th Middlesex	Melrose	Republican
	Richard M. Barry	June 5, 1863	6th Suffolk	Boston	
	Charles Waldo Bates	July 10, 1846	1st Worcester	Phillipston	
	George E. Bemis	October 23, 1855	5th Franklin	Charlemont	
	Charles H. Bennett	March 11, 1843	8th Hampden	Springfield	
	Thomas W. Bicknell	September 6, 1834	24th Suffolk	Boston	
	Roswell Billings	October 20, 1853	3rd Hampshire	Hatfield	
	George H. Bond	January 31, 1840	14th Suffolk	Boston	
	Charles H. Boodey	December 27, 1838	28th Middlesex	Wayland	
	Robert H. Bowman	September 26, 1855	17th Suffolk	Boston	
	Henry W. Britton	February 13, 1851	7th Norfolk	Stoughton	
	James L. Brophy	November 14, 1852	28th Middlesex	Framingham	
	Otis S. Brown	February 20, 1845	1st Middlesex	Cambridge	
	Herman Buchholz	November 23, 1839	8th Hampden	Springfield	
	William P. Buckley	August 15, 1859	4th Hampden	Holyoke	
	Andrew J. Bucklin	February 23, 1829	2nd Berkshire	Adams	
	Walter Jesse David Bullock	July 11, 1860	9th Bristol	Fall River	
	James J. Burke	March 4, 1862	12th Suffolk	Boston	
	William M. Butler	January 29, 1861	6th Bristol	New Bedford	Republican
	Hiram Torrey Cady	January 17, 1843	1st Berkshire	North Adams	
	Patrick Cannon	May 2, 1854	7th Suffolk	Boston	
	George N. Carpenter	January 26, 1840	2nd Norfolk	Brookline	
	Horatio Carpenter	September 11, 1833	1st Bristol	Seekonk	
	Charles Ernest Carter	June 1, 1850	24th Middlesex	Lowell	
	Richard A. Carter	February 16, 1862	5th Essex	Lawrence	
	John S. Cate	March 25, 1839	10th Middlesex	Everett	Republican
	Ansel E. Chamberlin	December 6, 1844	4th Berkshire	Dalton	
	Sidney Horton Cheeseman	August 11, 1843	5th Berkshire	Becket	
	Ansel O. Clark	October 17, 1834	6th Norfolk	Braintree	
	Edwin T. Clark	August 1, 1849	3rd Plymouth	Hanson	
	George E. Clarke	October 30, 1822	1st Barnstable	Falmouth	
	Horace E. Clayton	1854	2nd Middlesex	Cambridge	
	Alonzo Coburn	October 16, 1821	27th Middlesex	Hopkinton	
	Peter A. Conlin	January 26, 1858	19th Worcester	Worcester	
	Thomas H. Connell	September 18, 1849	24th Middlesex	Dracut	
	Morton E. Converse	November 17, 1837	2nd Worcester	Winchendon	
	Henry Cook	April 4, 1835	14th Worcester	Leominster	
	Louis A. Cook	May 4, 1847	5th Norfolk	Weymouth	
	George P. Cooke	October 28, 1849	11th Worcester	Milford	
	John William Coveney	April 10, 1845	3rd Middlesex	Cambridge	
	Robert Bruce Crane	1845	2nd Hampden	Westfield	
	Lorenzo B. Crockett	December 9, 1854	2nd Bristol	Easton	
	Francis C. Curtis	March 13, 1836	29th Middlesex	Marlborough	
	Joseph A. Cushing	December 24, 1846	5th Norfolk	Weymouth	
	Nahum Sawin Cutler	April 7, 1837	1st Franklin	Greenfield	
	Frank William Dallinger	June 5, 1852	4th Middlesex	Cambridge	Republican
	Luther Dame	March 3, 1826	8th Essex	Newbury	
	Epes Davis	March 14, 1824	10th Essex	Gloucester	
	Everett Allen Davis	October 11, 1857	16th Suffolk	Boston	
	Joshua H. Davis	November 3, 1814	5th Middlesex	Somerville	
	Benjamin Day	September 4, 1822	16th Essex	Marblehead	
	Frederick B. Day	March 20, 1843	1st Suffolk	Boston	
	Herbert O. Delano	July 7, 1847	1st Essex	Merrimac	
	John W. Delano	April 16, 1852	7th Plymouth	Marion	
	Jeremiah Desmond	May 2, 1853	16th Suffolk	Boston	
	Henry S. Dewey	1856	21st Suffolk	Boston	Republican
	Owen M. Donohoe	October 21, 1861	23rd Middlesex	Lowell	
	William B. Durant	September 29, 1844	1st Middlesex	Cambridge	
	J. Homer Edgerly	May 5, 1844	3rd Suffolk	Boston	
	Nathan Edson	September 16, 1817	1st Barnstable	Barnstable	
	John Edwards	December 23, 1852	8th Bristol	Fall River	
	George D. Eldredge	December 17, 1858	5th Hampden	Chicopee	
	S. Hopkins Emery	August 22, 1815	3rd Bristol	Taunton	
	John W. Fairbanks	October 12, 1843	12th Worcester	Westborough	
	James M. Farnum	1822	10th Worcester	Uxbridge	
	Warren Fenno	December 2, 1854	27th Suffolk	Revere	
	Myron J. Ferren	August 16, 1836	12th Middlesex	Stoneham	
	Alfred Frary Field	June 16, 1843	4th Franklin	Leverett	
	Joseph Henry Fletcher	September 26, 1844	16th Middlesex	Belmont	
	Charles W. Flint	May 3, 1827	20th Middlesex	Chelmsford	
	Carlos M. Gage	July 21, 1849	9th Hampden	Monson	
	Michael J. Garvey	May 27, 1859	21st Middlesex	Lowell	
	John F. Gillespie	April 18, 1855	6th Suffolk	Boston	
	Gorham D. Gilman	May 29, 1822	17th Middlesex	Newton	
	Edward B. Glasgow		23rd Worcester	Worcester	
	Edward A. Goddard	1845	2nd Franklin	Orange	
	Frank T. Goodhue	January 20, 1854	9th Essex	Ipswich	
	Moses C. Goodnow	June 20, 1846	4th Worcester	Princeton	
	David E. Gould	April 14, 1863	26th Suffolk	Chelesa	
	Robert S. Gray	September 28, 1847	7th Norfolk	Walpole	
	Charles Greene	May 10, 1840	6th Essex	Andover	
	William S. Greenough	August 25, 1843	13th Middlesex	Wakefield	
	Lewis G. Grossman	May 6, 1843	19th Suffolk	Boston	
	William M. Hale	June 26, 1820	3rd Bristol	Taunton	
	Aaron C. Handley	October 7, 1823	30th Middlesex	Acton	
	Charles H. Hanson	July 7, 1844	24th Middlesex	Lowell	
	Emerson G. Harrington	September 21, 1845	6th Berkshire	Egremont	
	James W. Harvey	April 10, 1844	25th Suffolk	Boston	
	Elihu B. Hayes	April 26, 1848	18th Essex	Lynn	Republican
	James B. Hayes	February 24, 1858	12th Suffolk	Boston	
	Augustus Hemenway	1853	4th Norfolk	Canton	
	Charles W. Henderson	June 3, 1842	4th Middlesex	Cambridge	
	Edward E. Herrod	November 4, 1857	10th Plymouth	Brockton	
	John E. Heslan	November 11, 1854	22nd Suffolk	Boston	
	John Hildreth	October 18, 1851	3rd Hampden	Holyoke	
	Stanley B. Hildreth	June 8, 1845	13th Worcester	Harvard	
	Arthur G. Hill	December 6, 1841	1st Hampshire	Northampton	
	Langdon H. Holder	March 10, 1846	20th Essex	Lynn	
	Dwight H. Hollister	October 24, 1834	1st Hampden	Southwick	
	George Mitchell Hooper	September 1, 1838	9th Plymouth	Bridgewater	
	John F. Howard	March 24, 1843	4th Essex	Lawrence	
	Willard Howland	December 3, 1852	27th Suffolk	Chelsea	
	John H. Hulford	November 11, 1841	5th Essex	Lawrence	
	William W. Hunt	May 15, 1842	3rd Franklin	Wendell	
	John T. Hurley	October 26, 1855	8th Bristol	Fall River	
	Henry H. Johnson	March 24, 1840	2nd Essex	Haverhill	
	Charlie A. Jones	September 9, 1847	14th Middlesex	Woburn	
	Chester Kellogg	December 27, 1830	4th Hampden	Granby	
	David B. Kempton	April 25, 1818	5th Bristol	New Bedford	
	George Kendall	March 1, 1839	2nd Worcester	Gardner	
	P. J. Kennedy	January 14, 1858	2nd Suffolk	Boston	Democratic
	Frederick M. Kilmer	February 8, 1852	7th Middlesex	Somerville	
	Henry Albert Kimball	May 3, 1842	1st Hampshire	Northampton	
	John W. Kimball	February 27, 1828	15th Worcester	Fitchburg	Republican
	Rufus Kimball	March 13, 1829	19th Essex	Lynn	
	Albert C. Kirby	March 17, 1841	7th Bristol	Westport	
	Francis W. Kittredge	June 4, 1843	21st Suffolk	Boston	
	Nathaniel W. Ladd	January 7, 1848	10th Suffolk	Boston	
	Hiram B. Lane	August 17, 1824	6th Hampden	Springfield	
	Andrew Berkley Lattimore	August 4, 1852	9th Suffolk	Boston	
	Horace G. Leslie	April 13, 1842	1st Essex	Amesbury	
	James A. Lewis	May 20, 1834	4th Bristol	Fairhaven	
	James D. Lincoln	1823	8th Norfolk	Wrentham	
	Stephen S. Littlefield	August 8, 1848	21st Essex	Peabody	
	Joseph P. Lomasney	March 10, 1863	8th Suffolk	Boston	Democratic
	Lewis P. Loring	July 10, 1822	4th Plymouth	Hull	
	Haile R. Luther	February 7, 1838	5th Bristol	New Bedford	
	John B. Lynch	April 13, 1858	15th Suffolk	Boston	
	Henry Stephen Lyons	November 21, 1865	1st Berkshire	North Adams	
	Joseph B. Maccabe	November 19, 1857	1st Suffolk	Boston	
	John Macfarlane	June 11, 1841	19th Essex	Lynn	
	Pardon Macomber	February 9, 1833	9th Bristol	Fall River	
	William Mahanna	November 25, 1854	3rd Berkshire	Lenox	
	Cornelius B. Marchant	November 14, 1815	1st Dukes	Edgartown	
	Peter J. McDonald	May 3, 1860	4th Berkshire	Pittsfield	
	John H. McDonough	March 29, 1857	20th Suffolk	Boston	
	John James McDonough	March 15, 1857	8th Bristol	Fall River	
	Thomas O. McEnaney	October 23, 1857	2nd Suffolk	Boston	
	Michael J. McEttrick	June 22, 1848	20th Suffolk	Boston	Democratic
	John McFethries	1830	7th Hampden	Springfield	
	Daniel McLaughlin	1847	7th Suffolk	Boston	
	Jeremiah J. McNamara	December 5, 1864	13th Suffolk	Boston	
	William S. McNary	March 29, 1863	15th Suffolk	Boston	Democratic
	William E. Meade	August 2, 1839	14th Essex	Salem	
	Robert F. Means	August 22, 1838	14th Suffolk	Boston	
	George W. Miller	September 9, 1852	6th Hampden	Springfield	
	Charles S. Millet	January 29, 1858	5th Plymouth	Rockland	
	Henry S. Milton	September 28, 1855	18th Middlesex	Waltham	
	Michael J. Mitchell	July 29, 1855	3rd Suffolk	Boston	
	Hiram A. Monk	July 16, 1829	11th Plymouth	Brockton	
	Charles Moore	June 13, 1831	18th Middlesex	Waltham	
	Michael J. Moore	September 23, 1863	13th Suffolk	Boston	
	Louis E. P. Moreau	February 25, 1857	6th Worcester	Spencer	
	David F. Moreland	August 30, 1857	14th Middlesex	Woburn	
	Eugene Michael Moriarty	April 15, 1849	18th Worcester	Worcester	
	Frank Morison	March 18, 1844	9th Suffolk	Boston	
	Lyman Morse	February 24, 1837	12th Worcester	Berlin	
	Edward Mott	June 19, 1830	3rd Bristol	Taunton	
	George N. Munsell	December 14, 1835	2nd Barnstable	Harwich	
	Michael Joseph Murray	June 18, 1867	15th Worcester	Fitchburg	
	John Henry Norcross	October 20, 1841	8th Middlesex	Medford	
	John O'Brien	October 1, 1855	24th Suffolk	Boston	
	Henry P. Oakman	June 27, 1831	4th Essex	Lawrence	
	John Parkhurst	December 30, 1826	7th Essex	Boxford	
	Wellington Evarts Parkhurst	January 19, 1835	13th Worcester	Clinton	
	Oren B. Parks	December 28, 1846	2nd Hampden	Westfield	
	Alfred W. Paul	August 5, 1822	10th Bristol	Dighton	
	Alonzo Penney	September 23, 1835	20th Essex	Lynn	
	Augustus G. Perkins	June 20, 1846	18th Suffolk	Boston	
	Benjamin F. Peterson	October 11, 1836	6th Plymouth	Whitman	
	Benjamin P. Pickering	February 22, 1844	13th Essex	Salem	
	Wilbur Howard Powers	January 22, 1849	3rd Norfolk	Hyde Park	
	Edward W. Presho	May 29, 1859	5th Suffolk	Boston	
	Winfield F. Prime	November 22, 1860	4th Suffolk	Boston	Republican
	Lewis C. Prindle	March 18, 1847	7th Worcester	Charlton	
	James Quigley	November 11, 1839	11th Worcester	Mendon	
	Josiah Quincy VI	October 15, 1859	5th Norfolk	Quincy	Democratic
	Patrick James Quinn	June 4, 1843	20th Worcester	Worcester	
	Andrew J. Rady	May 1, 1853	2nd Middlesex	Cambridge	
	Frederick J. Ranlett	November 17, 1857	17th Middlesex	Newton	
	Francis Henry Raymond	February 19, 1836	6th Middlesex		
	William H. Rice	1841	17th Worcester	Worcester	
	Richard A. Rich	October 19, 1844	3rd Barnstable	Truro	
	Arthur C. Richardson	October 31, 1837	8th Essex	Newburyport	
	William R. Rowell	March 19, 1844	3rd Essex	Methuen	
	Willis R. Russ	October 30, 1854	19th Suffolk	Boston	
	John J. Salter	January 11, 1856	17th Essex	Lynn	
	Horace H. Sanders	August 27, 1835	10th Hampden	Palmer	
	Alpheus Sanford	July 5, 1856	17th Suffolk	Boston	
	George P. Sanger Jr.	September 6, 1852	11th Suffolk	Boston	
	Nathan H. Sears	November 28, 1830	9th Worcester	Millbury	
	Robert K. Sears	August 29, 1844	22nd Essex	Danvers	
	Everett F. Sherman	1826	1st Plymouth	Plymouth	
	Anthony Smalley	March 15, 1836	1st Nantucket	Nantucket	
	Philo Smith	1820	7th Berkshire	Otis	
	William D. Sohier	October 22, 1858	12th Essex	Beverly	
	William B. Sprout	1859	22nd Worcester	Worcester	
	Stephen Stanley	June 11, 1842	1st Bristol	North Attleborough	
	William H. Stearns	April 11, 1850	15th Essex	Salem	
	Isaac Newton Story	November 30, 1834	10th Essex	Gloucester	
	Martin L. Stover	October 22, 1837	3rd Essex	Haverhill	
	Edward Sullivan	August 14, 1844	10 Suffolk	Boston	
	John H. Sullivan	June 24, 1850	8th Suffolk	Boston	
	George N. Swallow	January 2, 1854	5th Suffolk	Boston	
	James M. Swallow	April 14, 1821	31st Middlesex	Dunstable	
	Edgar Sidney Taft	June 30, 1853	10th Essex	Gloucester	
	Harrison O. Thomas	June 28, 1840	12th Plymouth	Brockton	
	Lysander Thurston	May 25, 1837	5th Hampshire	Enfield	
	Edwin A. Tibbetts	April 24, 1840	17th Essex	Lynn	
	Frank B. Tilton	March 15, 1840	26th Middlesex	Natick	
	Hermon C. Tower	March 8, 1843	29th Middlesex	Hudson	
	Pelatiah R. Tripp	August 15, 1842	23rd Suffolk	Boston	
	John S. True (Note: Died January 3.)	October 22, 1828		Woburn	
	George F. Tucker	January 19, 1852	6th Bristol	New Bedford	
	George Keyes Tufts	October 17, 1841	5th Worcester	New Braintree	
	Henry Edward Turner	May 4, 1842	9th Middlesex	Malden	Republican
	William H. H. Tuttle	August 17, 1845	15th Middlesex	Arlington	
	Daniel H. Varnum	February 11, 1850	22nd Middlesex	Lowell	
	James S. Wallace	October 17, 1846	11th Essex	Rockport	
	Jacob Otis Wardwell	March 14, 1857	2nd Essex	Haverhill	
	Richard H. Warren	March 9, 1854	8th Worcester	Auburn	
	Henry C. Wheaton	May 25, 1839	16th Worcester	Worcester	
	Charles S. Wheeler	June 11, 1851	19th Middlesex	Lincoln	
	Walter Adams Wheeler	August 14, 1850	3rd Worcester	Rutland	
	Franklin B. White	1837	21st Worcester	Worcester	
	George F. Williams	July 10, 1852	1st Norfolk	Dedham	Democratic
	Frank E. Winslow	May 16, 1852	11th Suffolk	Boston	
	Daniel S. Woodman	April 12, 1842	8th Norfolk	Medway	
	Charles F. Worcester	February 25, 1859	32nd Middlesex	Townsend	
	Ira A. Worth	October 23, 1828	4th Suffolk	Boston	

== See also ==
- 51st United States Congress
- List of Massachusetts General Courts
