= 1889 Massachusetts legislature =

110th Massachusetts General Court
←	109th	111th	→

Overview
- Legislative body: General Court
- Election: November 6, 1888

Senate
- Members: 40
- President: Harris C. Hartwell
- Party control: Republican

House
- Members: 240
- Speaker: William Emerson Barrett
- Party control: Republican

Sessions
- 1st: January 2, 1889 – June 7, 1889

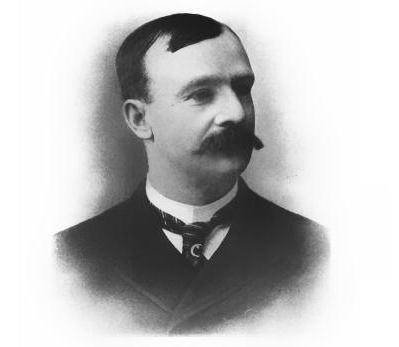
Harris Hartwell, Senate president.

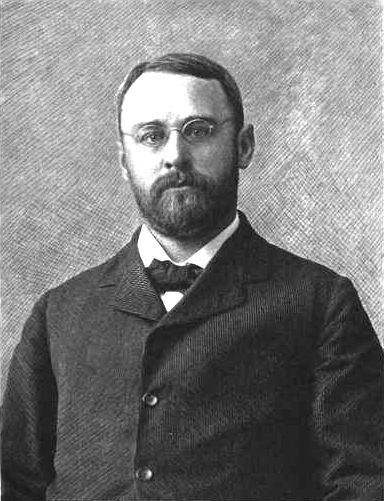
William Barrett, House speaker.

Leaders of the Massachusetts General Court, 1889.

The 110th Massachusetts General Court, consisting of the Massachusetts Senate and the Massachusetts House of Representatives, met in 1889 during the governorship of Oliver Ames. Harris C. Hartwell served as president of the Senate and William Emerson Barrett served as speaker of the House.

When in session at the state house in Boston, a few of the legislators stayed overnight in Adams House, the American House, Hotel Brunswick, Norfolk House, Quincy House, Richwood House, or the United States Hotel.

== Senators ==
Image	Name	Date of birth	District	Party
	Edwin Baker	January 18, 1843		
	Benjamin F. Campbell	September 12, 1834		
	William Alfred Clark	1852		
	John Aloysius Collins	1860		
	Benjamin Franklin Cook	January 1, 1833		
	Thomas Washburn Cook	September 15, 1837		
	John Crawford Crosby	June 15, 1859		
	William Nathaniel Davenport	November 3, 1856		
	Edward Joseph Donovan	March 15, 1864		
	James Donovan	May 28, 1859		
	James Fisher Dwinell	July 23, 1825		
	Alonzo Hathaway Evans	February 24, 1820		
	Alfred Swift Fassett	December 5, 1848		
	David Fisk	May 6, 1838		
	George Washington Gibson	1851		
	Jubal Converse Gleason	1837		
	Daniel Gunn	1850		
	James H. Harlow	September 11, 1814		
	Harris Cowdrey Hartwell	1847		
	Edward Jacob Hathorne	1854		
	Henry Joseph Hosmer	February 2, 1832		
	Robert Howard	February 8, 1845		
	Frank W. Howe	June 3, 1859		
	Thomas F. Hunt	October 27, 1854		
	Chester Ward Kingsley	1824		
	Austin Messinger	1817		
	Edwin Dickinson Metcalf	March 14, 1848		
	Edward F. O'Sullivan	June 23, 1858		
	Moses Poore Palmer	1830		
	Henry Langdon Parker	October 7, 1834		
	James Davis Pike	1829		
	Edwin Lake Pilsbury	1850		
	Henry Harrison Sprague	August 1, 1841		
	Charles E. Stevens	April 21, 1843		
	James Trimble Stevens	1835		
	Charles Henry Symonds	1857		
	Enos Houghton Tucker	1817		
	David Walker	1841		
	Silas Mandeville Wheelock	1818		
	Levi Lincoln Whitney	1838		

== Representatives ==
image	Name	Date of birth	District	Party
	Warren W. Adams	December 11, 1844		
	John Albree	March 14, 1829		
	Jared F. Alden	April 18, 1836		
	Thomas Alden	August 17, 1827		
	Montressor Tyler Allen	1844		
	Richard B. Allen	January 25, 1859		
	Horace H. Atherton	October 23, 1847	20th	
	Ralph L. Atherton	June 30, 1842		
	Harrison Henry Atwood	August 26, 1863		
	George Ayres	August 26, 1833		
	Rollin Herbert Babbitt	1840		
	Lewis M. Bancroft	December 31, 1851		
	Thomas E. Barker	March 13, 1839		
	Franklin O. Barnes	November 11, 1841		
	William Emerson Barrett	December 29, 1858		
	Richard M. Barry	June 5, 1863		
	Walter P. Beck	January 20, 1850		
	Charles H. Bennett	March 11, 1843		
	John O. Bennett	November 8, 1838		
	Francis T. Berry	August 18, 1849		
	Thomas W. Bicknell	September 6, 1834		
	Alden M. Bigelow	March 28, 1848		
	Charles Chauncey Bixby	1824		
	George Bliss	November 20, 1844		
	Percival Blodgett	July 18, 1841		
	Andreas Blume	1837		
	Nelson F. Bond	January 9, 1839		
	J. Dean Bonney	January 28, 1831		
	John Bennett Bottum			
	Joshua L. D. Bowerman			
	Robert H. Bowman	September 26, 1855		
	Peter Joseph Brady	October 29, 1861		
	Edward Winslow Brewer	1858		
	Charles K. Brewster	June 11, 1843		
	Asa Olin Brooks	1852		
	Horace Brooks	July 22, 1835		
	William Henry Brooks	January 11, 1831		
	Edward F. Brown	July 11, 1843		
	Orland J. Brown	February 2, 1848		
	John H. Burgess	November 25, 1852		
	James J. Burke	March 4, 1862		
	Charles Amos Call	1839		
	Joseph Henry Cannell	1836		
	George N. Carpenter	January 26, 1840		
	Peter Thomas Carroll	1857		
	Charles Ernest Carter	June 1, 1850		
	Joseph Pike Cheney	1843		
	Moses Davis Church	1842		
	Horace E. Clayton	1854		
	George L. Clemence	February 17, 1852		
	Nelson B. Conant	December 6, 1845		
	Thomas H. Connell	September 18, 1849		
	David Conwell	1818		
	Louis A. Cook	May 4, 1847		
	John William Coveney	April 10, 1845		
	Robert Bruce Crane	1845		
	James Martin Cronin	1857		
	Joshua Crowell	1841		
	John H. Crowley	August 20, 1858		
	Francis C. Curtis	March 13, 1836		
	Nahum Sawin Cutler	April 7, 1837		
	George W. Cutting	November 18, 1834		
	Frank William Dallinger	June 5, 1852		
	Luther Dame	March 3, 1826		
	Epes Davis	March 14, 1824		
	Joshua H. Davis	November 3, 1814		
	Thomas Haven Dearing	October 25, 1826		
	Jeremiah Desmond	May 2, 1853		
	Henry S. Dewey	1856		
	Simeon Dodge, Jr.	February 23, 1840		
	William S. Douglas	April 5, 1836		
	Hugo A. Dubuque	November 3, 1854		
	Thomas H. Duggan	March 11, 1848		
	Lyman R. Eddy	March 21, 1837		
	John Edwards	December 23, 1852		
	George D. Eldredge	December 17, 1858		
	Albert R. Eldridge	September 10, 1850		
	Thomas George Farren	1858		
	Myron J. Ferren	August 16, 1836		
	William F. Ferry	July 4, 1854		
	Charles N. Foote	December 14, 1848		
	Jacob Fottler	1839		
	Henry Frost	1832		
	Charles B. Gardiner	June 19, 1849		
	Michael J. Garvey	May 27, 1859		
	Theodore Giddings	December 5, 1837		
	John F. Gillespie	April 18, 1855		
	Gorham D. Gilman	May 29, 1822		
	Thomas K. Gilman	August 11, 1842		
	Edward B. Glasgow			
	William Gordon	1825		
	John B. Gould	November 29, 1820		
	Samuel Levis Gracey	1835		
	Charles Grant, Jr.	June 26, 1844		
	Robert S. Gray	September 28, 1847		
	Abner Greenwood	September 10, 1826		
	William M. Hale	June 26, 1820		
	Henry D. Hamilton	June 22, 1848		
	Charles H. Hanson	July 7, 1844		
	Z. Taylor Harrington	November 14, 1848		
	Robert O. Harris	November 8, 1854		
	James W. Harvey	April 10, 1844		
	Phineas W. Haseltine	May 15, 1846		
	Forbes P. Haskell	April 6, 1844		
	Elihu B. Hayes	April 26, 1848		
	Robert Henry	1833		
	John E. Heslan	November 11, 1854		
	John Hildreth	October 18, 1851		
	William Southerland Hixon	1848		
	John D. Holbrook	October 6, 1843		
	Langdon H. Holder	March 10, 1846		
	Frank E. Holman	August 8, 1853		
	John F. Howard	March 24, 1843		
	Herbert W. Howe	December 17, 1842		
	Charles Howes	December 14, 1833		
	Willard Howland	December 3, 1852		
	John F. Hutchinson	January 6, 1856		
	Henry H. Johnson	March 24, 1840		
	Jeremiah Joseph Keane	1855		
	Thomas J. Keliher	October 13, 1858		
	Horace G. Kemp	August 19, 1849		
	David B. Kempton	April 25, 1818		
	Patrick Joseph Kennedy	January 14, 1858		
	John White Kimball	February 27, 1828		
	Henry Albert Kimball	May 3, 1842		
	Rufus Kimball	March 13, 1829		
	Francis W. Kittredge	June 4, 1843		
	James Lally	1862		
	Hiram B. Lane	August 17, 1824		
	Andrew Berkley Lattimore	August 4, 1852		
	William W. Leach	February 22, 1856		
	Edward Joseph Leary	May 27, 1860		
	James D. Lincoln	1823		
	Stephen S. Littlefield	August 8, 1848		
	Clarence Parker Lovell	1848		
	John Macfarlane	June 11, 1841		
	James Pope Martin	1827		
	Samuel Walker McCall	February 28, 1851		
	Thomas McCooey	1851		
	Peter J. McDonald	May 3, 1860		
	John H. McDonough	March 29, 1857		
	John James McDonough	March 15, 1857		
	Thomas O. McEnaney	October 23, 1857		
	Michael Joseph McEttrick	June 22, 1848		
	Daniel McLaughlin	1847		
	William S. McNary	March 29, 1863		
	Albert Mead	April 23, 1830		
	Robert F. Means	August 22, 1838		
	James H. Mellen	November 7, 1845		
	Noah F. Mendall	May 2, 1836		
	John Flint Merrill	January 16, 1849		
	Albert E. Miller	1834		
	Henry S. Milton	September 28, 1855		
	William Henry Monahan	1857		
	Michael J. Moore	September 23, 1863		
	Frank Morison	March 18, 1844		
	I. Porter Morse	April 10, 1861		
	William H. Murphy	December 18, 1855		
	Albert H. Newhall	December 25, 1834		
	Edward M. Nichols	August 22, 1848		
	William H. Nichols	October 6, 1846		
	Joseph Nolan	April 27, 1860		
	John Henry Norcross	October 20, 1841		
	John William O'Mealey	1861		
	John William O'Neil	1859		
	Henry P. Oakman	June 27, 1831		
	John B. Packard	February 22, 1837		
	Frank E. Paige	March 22, 1859		
	Oren B. Parks	December 28, 1846		
	Joseph A. Patridge	January 3, 1830		
	George Arthur Perkins	1856		
	Charles Perry	May 31, 1840		
	Charles Quincy Pierce	1841		
	John N. Pierce	December 8, 1833		
	Baxter P. Pike	February 22, 1845		
	Omer Pillsbury	November 15, 1853		
	Alfred Stamm Pinkerton	March 19, 1856		
	John Wallace Plaisted	1828		
	Charles French Porter	January 16, 1836		
	Lurin J. Potter	June 6, 1846		
	Harvey Hunter Pratt	1860		
	William Henry Preble	1856		
	John Jacob Prevaux	March 16, 1857		
	Ellis B. Purrington	January 31, 1831		
	Charles C. Putnam	May 28, 1844		
	Francis Winnie Qua	1845		
	Dennis Joseph Quinn	1861		
	Francis Henry Raymond	February 19, 1836		
	George A. Reed	September 10, 1842		
	James Henry Richards	1839		
	Albert E. Richmond	September 23, 1819		
	Thomas Riley	December 22, 1843		
	John B. Ripley	July 8, 1849		
	William R. Rowell	March 19, 1844		
	Charles Parks Rugg	1827		
	Irving Levi Russell	1852		
	Stillman Russell	December 11, 1836		
	Chester Franklin Sanger	1858		
	George P. Sanger	September 6, 1852		
	Edward Payson Shaw	September 1, 1841		
	Charles H. Shepard	October 19, 1842		
	George A. Shepard	December 23, 1820		
	Everett F. Sherman	1826		
	George Wing Slocum	1818		
	Winfield Scott Slocum	1848		
	Anthony Smalley	March 15, 1836		
	Henry O. Smith	September 15, 1839		
	Thomas Snow	March 16, 1854		
	William D. Sohier	October 22, 1858		
	Charles Edward Spring	1841		
	William B. Sprout	1859		
	John H. Stafford	November 16, 1841		
	Stephen Stanley	June 11, 1842		
	George C. Stearns	February 12, 1854		
	Daniel Philmore Stimpson	1818		
	Martin L. Stover	October 22, 1837		
	Edward Sullivan	August 14, 1844		
	John H. Sullivan	June 24, 1850		
	Michael F. Sullivan	September 21, 1859		
	George N. Swallow	January 2, 1854		
	Edgar Sidney Taft	June 30, 1853		
	Rufus Albert Thayer	1839		
	Albert Cranston Thompson	1843		
	Isaac Brownell Tompkins	August 17, 1826		
	Peletiah R. Tripp	August 15, 1842		
	Henry Edward Turner	May 4, 1842		
	Abijah Tyler Wales	1833		
	Jacob Otis Wardwell	March 14, 1857		
	William Leonard White	1843		
	Charles M. Wilcox	August 13, 1861		
	John H. Wilkins	October 14, 1832		
	Charles Thomas Witt	July 18, 1848		
	Samuel Wood	February 13, 1831		
	Charles Francis Woodward	November 19, 1852		
	Ira A. Worth	October 23, 1828		
	William A. Wyckoff	April 30, 1838		
	Ferdinand Adolphus Wyman	1850		

== See also ==
- 51st United States Congress
- List of Massachusetts General Courts
