= Wilder Philander Clark =

American politician (1832–1908)

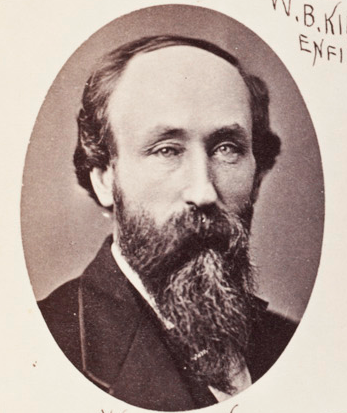

Personal details
- Born: Wilder Philander Clark; October 12, 1832 Chesterfield, New Hampshire
- Died: December 10, 1908 (aged 76)

Wilder Philander Clark (October 12, 1832 – December 10, 1908) was a businessman and state legislator in Massachusetts. He served in the Massachusetts House of Representatives as well as in the Massachusetts Senate in 1891 and 1892. He owned mills that made wood furniture. He was born in Chesterfield, New Hampshire, the son of Joseph Clark. He attended Chesterfield Academy. He married and had three children.

He died in 1908.

== See also ==
- 1877 Massachusetts legislature
- 1891 Massachusetts legislature
- 1892 Massachusetts legislature
