= Jeremiah Crowley =

Jeremiah Crowley may refer to:

- Jeremiah Crowley (politician) (1832–1901), in Massachusetts
- Jeremiah J. Crowley (1861–1927), American religious leader & writer
- Jeremiah D. Crowley, American socialist activist from New York
