= Frank P. Bennett Jr. =

American politician

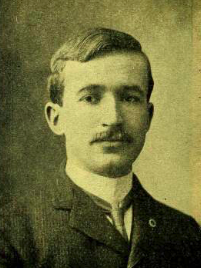

Saugus Town Moderator
- In office 1918–1937
- Preceded by: Thomas P. Parsons
- Succeeded by: Herbert Mason

Member of the Massachusetts State Senate Seventh Middlesex district
- In office 1910–1912
- Preceded by: James Wilson Grimes
- Succeeded by: Edward Fisher

Massachusetts House of Representatives 14th Essex District
- In office 1904–1906
- Preceded by: Frank P. Bennett
- Succeeded by: Herbert M. Forristall

Personal details
- Born: December 30, 1878 Palermo, Maine, US
- Died: July 6, 1965 (aged 86) Flint, Michigan, US
- Party: Republican
- Relations: Frank P. Bennett (Father)
- Education: Harvard University
- Profession: Publisher

Frank P. Bennett Jr. was an American politician, banker, and editor who served in the Massachusetts General Court. He was the son of Massachusetts State Representative Frank P. Bennett.

== Early life ==
Bennett was born on December 30, 1878, in Palermo, Maine. He attended public schools in Everett, Massachusetts, and graduated from Harvard University from 1900.

== Political career ==
Bennett was first elected to public office in 1903, winning a seat on the Saugus, Massachusetts, School Committee by seven votes (423 to 416). He was a member of the School Committee from 1903 to 1910 and served as the chairman of the board from 1908 to 1910.

Bennett served in the Massachusetts House of Representatives from 1904 to 1906. He served on the Ways and Means, Labor, Public Service, and Agriculture committees and was the Clerk of the Agriculture and Public Service committees.

From 1910 to 1912, he was a member of the Massachusetts Senate. He served as the chairman of the Counties and Street Railways committees.

In 1912, Bennett was the Republican nominee for U.S. Representative in Massachusetts's 7th congressional district. He lost to Democrat Michael Francis Phelan, 46% to 32%. He ran again in 1914, but withdrew from the race in August, saying that he could not spare the time necessary to run for Congress.

Bennett served on the Saugus Board of Selectmen in 1913. He was Saugus Town Moderator from 1918 to 1937.

== Business career ==
Bennett was the editor of the United States Investor and the American Wool and Cotton Reporter, two publications founded by his father. He also served as vice president and director of Frank P. Bennett Co., Inc., and treasurer and director of Oaklandvale Farm Co.

Bennett was a trustee of the Boston Five Cent Savings Bank and an incorporator and director of the Saugus Trust Company. He was also a director and investment committee member of the Holyoke Mutual Fire Insurance Company.

Bennett died on July 6, 1965, at the home of his son in Flint, Michigan.

== See also ==
- 131st Massachusetts General Court (1910)
