= William Everett =

American politician

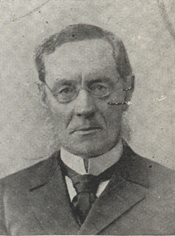

Member of the U.S. House of Representatives from Massachusetts's 7th district
- In office April 25, 1893 – March 3, 1895
- Preceded by: William Cogswell
- Succeeded by: William E. Barrett

Personal details
- Born: October 10, 1839 Watertown, Massachusetts, U.S.
- Died: February 16, 1910 (aged 70) Quincy, Massachusetts, U.S.
- Party: Democratic
- Parent(s): Edward Everett and Charlotte Gray Brooks

William Everett (October 10, 1839 – February 16, 1910) was an American academic and politician. He was born in Watertown, Massachusetts, the son of Charlotte Gray Brooks and Massachusetts governor and U.S. Secretary of State Edward Everett.

He graduated from Harvard University in 1859, from Trinity College, Cambridge in 1863 and from Harvard University's law department in 1865. He was admitted to the bar in 1866 and was licensed to preach in 1872 by the Suffolk Association of Unitarian Ministers. He tutored at Harvard University from 1870 to 1873, then was promoted to assistant professor of Latin, a position he held till 1877. He became master of Adams Academy in 1878.

Everett left Adams Academy in 1893 and was elected to the Fifty-third United States Congress as a Democrat representing Massachusetts's seventh district. He then followed in his father's footsteps by running for Governor of Massachusetts. However, he lost the election to the incumbent Roger Wolcott.

Everett returned to his job as master of Adams Academy in 1897. He died on February 16, 1910, and was interred with his parents in Mount Auburn Cemetery in Cambridge, Massachusetts.

U.S. House of Representatives
Preceded by William Cogswell	Member of the U.S. House of Representatives from Massachusetts's 7th congressional district April 25, 1893 – March 3, 1895	Succeeded by William E. Barrett
