= Andrew Berkley Lattimore =

American politician (1852–1907)

Andrew Berkley Lattimore (August 1852 - December 14, 1907) was a politician in Massachusetts. Serving in the Boston Common Council, he then served in the Massachusetts House of Representatives during the 1889 Massachusetts legislature and 1890 Massachusetts legislature. He was appointed to a 1-year term as a constable. He was born in August 1852 in Hampton, Virginia and was educated at the Hampton Colored Institute. He moved to Boston in 1886 and was elected to the ward 9 Common Council where he served for two years. He died December 14, 1907, at home in Boston after a lingering illness, and was survived by a wife and two sons.
