= James Atherton Tilden =

American politician (1835–1920)

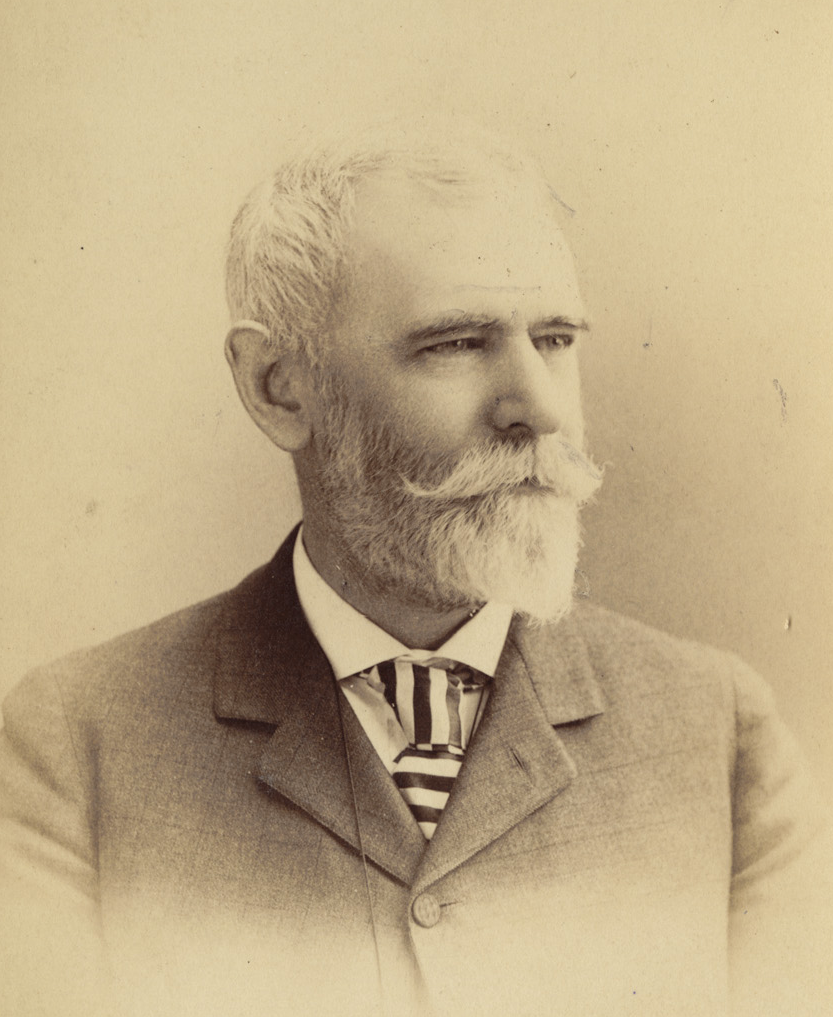
- Tilden c. 1893

Member of the Massachusetts House of Representatives for the 23rd Suffolk County District
- Incumbent
- Assumed office 1893
- Incumbent
- Assumed office 1894

Personal details
- Born: December 6, 1835 Hingham, Massachusetts, United States
- Died: 1920 Roxbury, Massachusetts
- Occupation: Merchant, Politician

James Atherton Tilden (December 6, 1835 - 1920) was an American politician from Boston, who served in the Massachusetts House of Representatives after being elected to the 114th Massachusetts General Court in 1892. He represented the twenty-third district in Suffolk County, and went on to also serve in the 115th Massachusetts General Court.

== Early life and education ==
Tilden was born in Hingham, Massachusetts and educated at Derby Academy in Hingham.

== Career ==
Tilden was a Boston merchant, having relocated to the city at the age of sixteen, and entered the service of Dutton, Richardson & Company, at the time located on Federal Street, Boston. His role was to sell dry goods. At the age of twenty-one, he entered the employ of James L. Little & Company, who represented as agents, the firm, Pacific Mills. Tilden remained in their employ for twenty-five years, until they ceased trading. He then took up a position in Canton Manufacturing and Bleaching Company, acting as treasurer, albeit in a part time position until his retirement.

Within the state legislature he served on the committee for cities in 1893 and Chairman of House committee on engrossed bills, and on the committee for cities in 1894.

== Personal ==
For many years Tilden owned a house at 1859 Center St, in the village center of West Roxbury, where the transcendentalist and abolitionist, Theodore Parker had preached years prior. In 1899 the home was sold and replaced the following year by the Theodore Parker Unitarian Universalist Church.

Tilden died during February 1920 and was buried at Forest Hills Cemetery in Roxbury, Boston on February 16, 1920.

== See also ==
- 1893 Massachusetts legislature
- 1894 Massachusetts legislature
