= William Emerson Barrett =

American journalist and politician

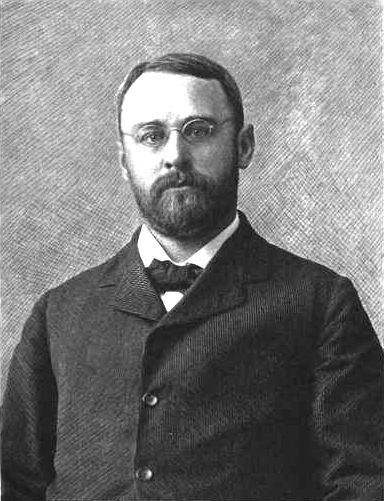

Member of the U.S. House of Representatives from Massachusetts's 7th district
- In office March 4, 1895 – March 3, 1899
- Preceded by: William Everett
- Succeeded by: Ernest W. Roberts

Massachusetts House of Representatives 11th Middlesex District
- In office 1888–1894

Speaker of the Massachusetts House of Representatives
- In office 1889–1894
- Preceded by: Charles J. Noyes
- Succeeded by: George von Lengerke Meyer

Personal details
- Born: December 29, 1858 Melrose, Massachusetts, U.S.
- Died: February 12, 1906 (aged 47) Newton, Massachusetts, U.S.
- Party: Republican
- Spouse: Annie Louise Bailey (m. December 28, 1887)
- Children: William Emerson Barrett, Florence Barrett, Ruth Barrett, Constance Barrett
- Education: Dartmouth

William Emerson Barrett (December 29, 1858 – February 12, 1906) was an American journalist and politician who founded The Boston Evening Record was a member of the Massachusetts House of Representatives and as a United States representative from Massachusetts.

Barrett was born in Melrose, Massachusetts on December 29, 1858. He attended public schools, and graduated from Dartmouth College in 1880. He was assistant editor of the St. Albans Daily Messenger, then joining the staff of The Boston Daily Advertiser. He was Washington correspondent of the newspaper 1882–1886. He was recalled to Boston to become editor in chief. In 1888 Barrett was promoted to chief proprietor and manager of The Boston Daily Advertiser and The Boston Evening Record.

Barrett was a member of the Massachusetts House of Representatives from 1887 to 1892 and served as speaker the last five years. He was elected as a Republican to the Fifty-fourth and Fifty-fifth Congresses (March 4, 1895 – March 3, 1899). He declined to be a candidate for renomination in 1898, and returned to Boston and resumed active management of his newspaper interests. Barrett served as president of the Union Trust Co. of Boston.

Barrett died of pneumonia in West Newton, Massachusetts on February 12, 1906. His interment was in Newton Cemetery.

== See also ==
- 110th Massachusetts General Court (1889)
- 111th Massachusetts General Court (1890)
- 113th Massachusetts General Court (1892)
- 114th Massachusetts General Court (1893)

== See also ==
- Massachusetts State House
- Massachusetts Senate
- Massachusetts General Court
- Massachusetts Government
- List of speakers of the Massachusetts House of Representatives

Massachusetts House of Representatives
Preceded by Charles J. Noyes	Speaker of the Massachusetts House of Representatives; 1899 — 1903	Succeeded by George von Lengerke Meyer
U.S. House of Representatives
Preceded by William Everett	Member of the U.S. House of Representatives from Massachusetts's 7th congressional district March 4, 1895 – March 3, 1899	Succeeded by Ernest W. Roberts
