= Quincy House (Boston) =

Hotel in Boston, Massachusetts

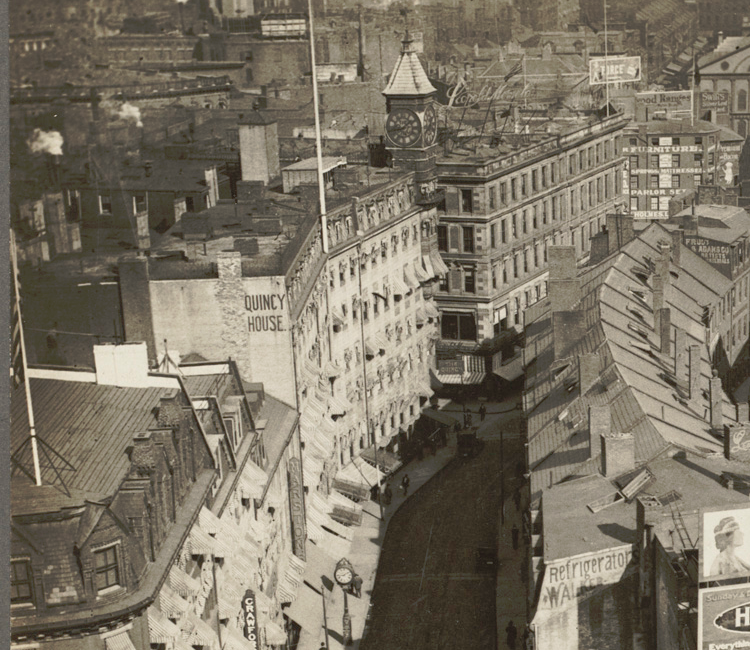
- Quincy House (left), c. 1920. The clock tower marks the southeastern corner of the hotel.

- Location within Boston

General information
- Type: Hotel
- Location: Brattle Square; Boston, Massachusetts; United States
- Coordinates: 42.3600°N 71.0587°W
- Opened: c. 1819
- Renovated: c. 1885
- Demolished: 1935

Technical details
- Floor count: 7
- Floor area: 23,500 sq ft (2,180 m^{2}) (approx.)

Other information
- Seating capacity: 500 (approx.)

The Quincy House was a hotel in downtown Boston, Massachusetts, United States.

Located on the corner of Brattle Street and Brattle Square in the neighborhood of Scollay Square, it was in operation for most of the 19th and early 20th centuries. It was the largest hotel in Boston in the late 19th century, and was a popular destination for prominent guests to the city. It also served as a major headquarters for labor unions in Boston.

Quincy House was closed in 1929. The site is now occupied by City Hall Plaza, in front of Boston City Hall.

== History ==
The original Quincy House was built in the early 1800s, on the site of the first Quaker meeting house in Boston. The hotel was built with Quincy granite, making it the first building in Boston to be constructed with that material. Over the course of the 19th century the hotel received several renovations and additions, the most extensive expansion occurring in c. 1885. By the end of the 19th century, the building reached seven stories in height and had approximately 500 rooms.

By the late 1800s, the Quincy House acquired a reputation as one of the most famous hotels in the city. Labor unions in particular frequented the establishment; labor leaders and strike committees customarily held their meetings there. The regular union presence at the Quincy House eventually resulted in the hotel advertising itself as the "official headquarters for organized labor" in the city. The Quincy House additionally served as a popular place for local politicians, and it especially became known as the meeting place of the Board of Strategy, a group of high-ranking Democratic politicians (including P. J. Kennedy) who selected candidates for office and distributed patronage to party loyalists.

The Quincy House's popularity began to suffer in the early 20th century; labor patronage declined during this period, and the building was eclipsed by newer hotels in the city. It was ultimately unable to recover from this downturn and closed on September 15, 1929. The hotel remained vacant for several years, during which the Suffolk Savings Bank and the First National Bank of Boston each acquired separate parcels of the building. In late 1934, the banks decided to raze the hotel, and in early 1935 it was demolished and replaced with a parking lot. The site is now occupied by City Hall Plaza, in front of Boston City Hall.

== Images ==
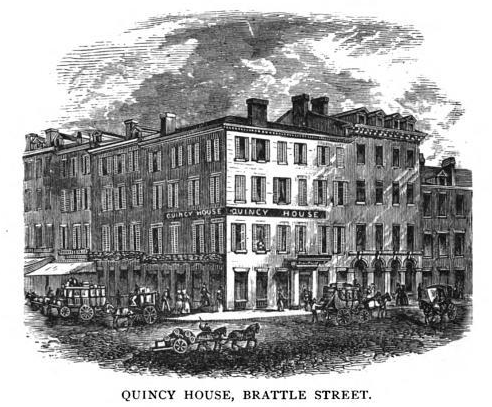
The old Quincy House, 1800s

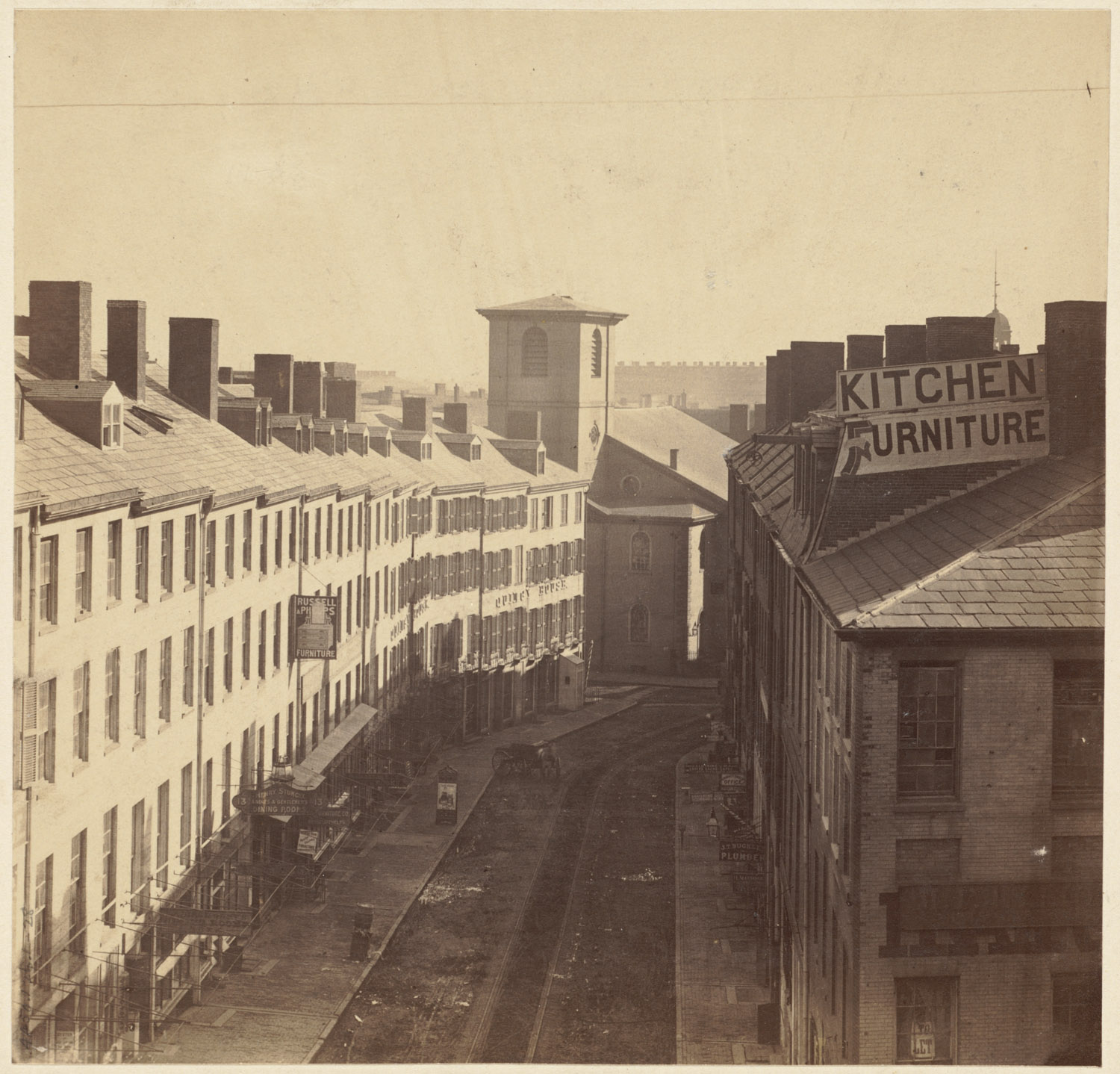
The old Quincy House (center, in front of the Brattle Street Church), c. 1860

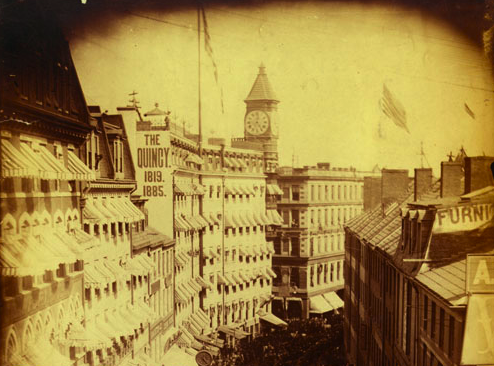
The Quincy House after its expansion, c. 1885

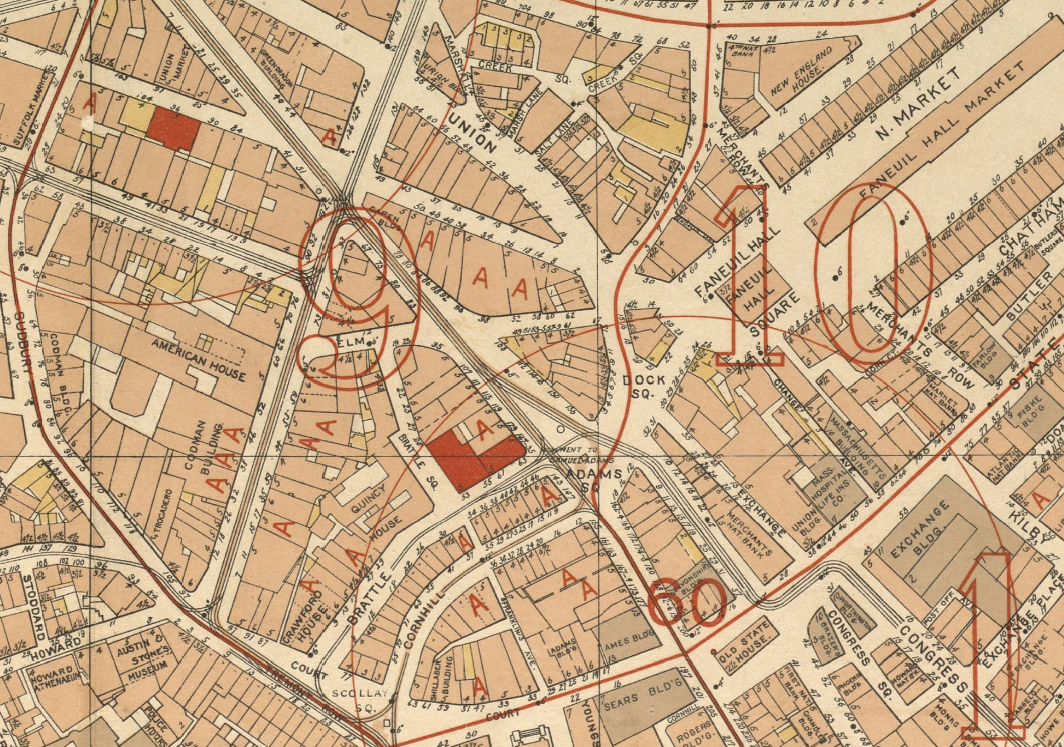
Map of Boston, showing location of the Quincy House (lower left), 1896

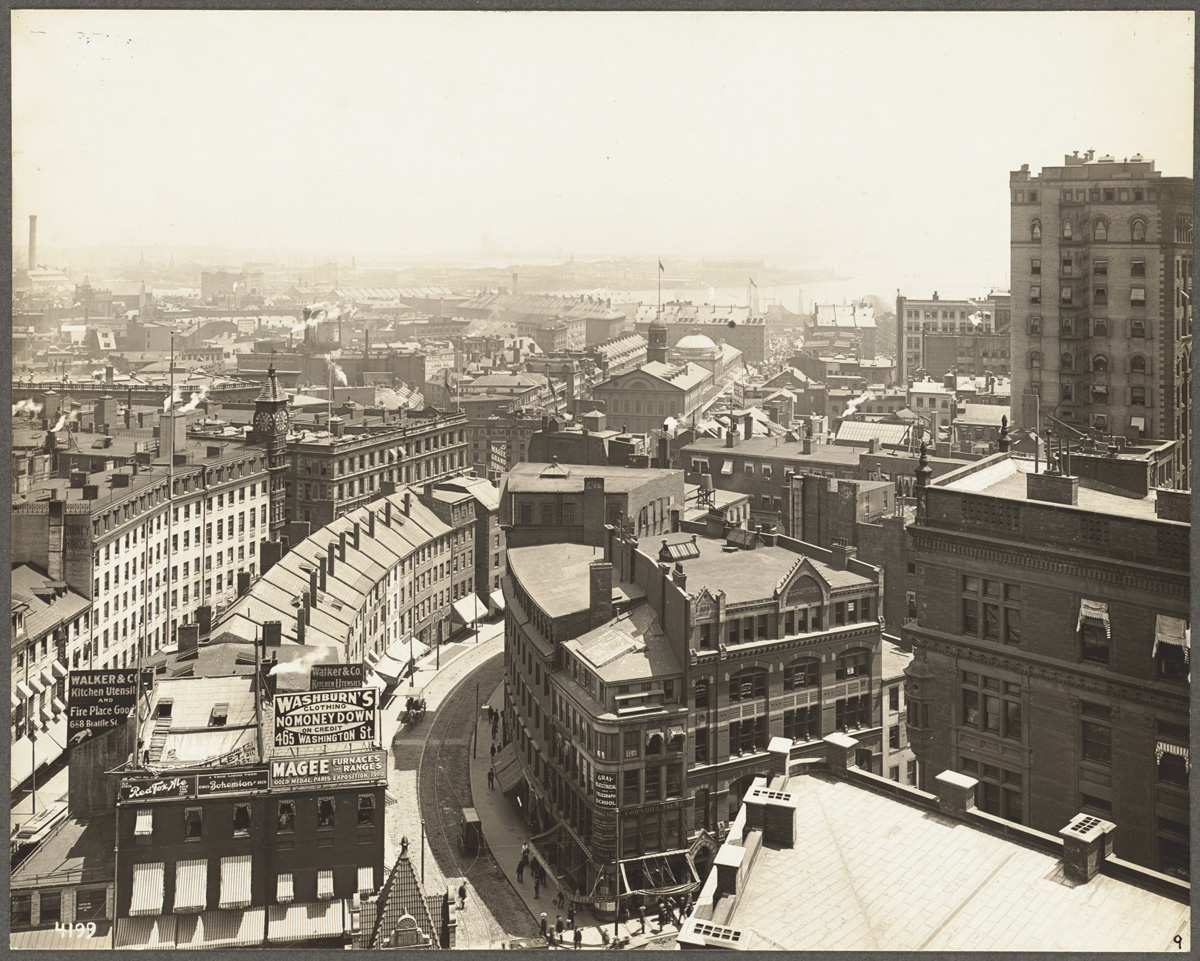
Quincy House (far left), c. 1905
