= Halsey J. Boardman =

American politician (1834–1900)

Halsey Joseph Boardman
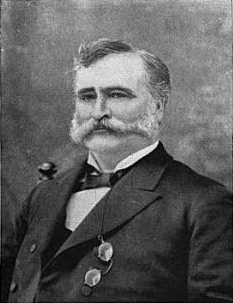

54th President of the Massachusetts Senate
- In office 1887–1888
- Preceded by: Albert E. Pillsbury
- Succeeded by: Harris C. Hartwell

Member of the Massachusetts Senate
- In office 1887–1888

Member of the Massachusetts House of Representatives
- In office 1883–1885

President of the Boston Common Council
- In office January 4, 1875 – January 3, 1876
- Preceded by: Edward Olcott Shepard
- Succeeded by: John Q. A. Brackett

Member of the Boston Common Council from Ward 14
- In office January 6, 1873 – January 3, 1876

Personal details
- Born: May 19, 1834 Norwich, Vermont
- Died: January 15, 1900 (aged 65) Boston, Massachusetts
- Party: Republican
- Spouse: Georgia M. Hinman
- Children: Flora M. Boardman and Emily I. Boardman.
- Education: Dartmouth College

Halsey Joseph Boardman (born May 19, 1834 – January 15, 1900) was a Massachusetts lawyer and politician who served in, and as the president of the Boston Common Council, in the Massachusetts House of Representatives and as a member and president of the Massachusetts Senate.

== Early life ==
Boardman was born on May 19, 1834, to Nathaniel and Sarah (Hunt) Boardman in Norwich, Vermont.

== Business life ==
Boardman was vice-president of the North Star Construction Company organized in 1890 that built significant portions of the Duluth and Winnipeg Railroad based in Duluth, Minnesota. In 1893 when the Canadian Pacific Railway took control of D & W, Boardman became president of the troubled railroad.

== Family life ==
Boardman married Georgia M. Hinman on November 6, 1861, they had two children, Flora M. Boardman, and Emily I. Boardman.

== Death ==
Boardman died on January 15, 1900, at his home in Boston, Massachusetts.

== See also ==
- 109th Massachusetts General Court (1888)

Political offices
Preceded by Edward Olcott Shepard	President of the Boston Common Council; January 4, 1875-January 3, 1876	Succeeded by John Quincy Adams Brackett
Preceded by Albert E. Pillsbury	54th President of the Massachusetts Senate; 1887-1888	Succeeded by Harris C. Hartwell
