= Ernest W. Roberts =

American politician

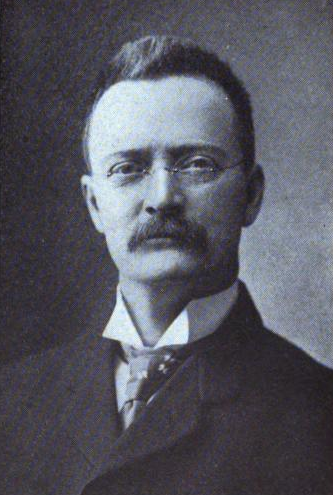
- Ernest W. Roberts circa 1908

Member of the U.S. House of Representatives from Massachusetts
- In office March 4, 1899 – March 3, 1917
- Preceded by: William Emerson Barrett
- Succeeded by: Alvan T. Fuller
- Constituency: 7th district (1899–1913); 9th district (1913–17)

Member of the Massachusetts Senate First Suffolk District
- In office 1897–1898
- Preceded by: Joseph Brewster Maccabe

Member of the Massachusetts House of Representatives
- In office 1894–1896

City of Chelsea City Council
- In office 1887–1888

Personal details
- Born: November 22, 1858 East Madison, Maine, U.S.
- Died: September 27, 1924 (aged 65)
- Party: Republican
- Spouse: Sara Weeks Roberts
- Education: Highland Military Academy, Boston University Law School
- Profession: Attorney

Ernest William Roberts (November 22, 1858 – February 27, 1924) was a U.S. representative from Massachusetts.

Born in East Madison, Maine, Roberts attended the public schools in Chelsea, Massachusetts. He was graduated from Highland Military Academy, Worcester, Massachusetts, in 1877, and from the law school of Boston University. Roberts was admitted to the bar in 1881 and then practiced in Boston. He served as member of the city council of Chelsea in 1887 and 1888. He served as member of the state House of Representatives in 1894 and 1896. He served in the state Senate in 1897 and 1898.

Roberts was elected as a Republican to the Fifty-sixth and to the eight succeeding Congresses. He represented the 7th Massachusetts congressional district from March 4, 1899, until March 3, 1913, and, after redistricting, represented the 9th Massachusetts congressional district from March 4, 1913 to March 3, 1917. He was chairman of the Committee on Private Land Claims (Sixty-first Congress). He was an unsuccessful candidate in 1916, losing with 16,765 votes to Alvan T. Fuller, another Republican running as an Independent, with 17,079.

Roberts was named a Regent of the Smithsonian Institution December 1913 and reappointed to another term two years later.

After leaving Congress he practiced law in Washington, D.C., until his death on February 27, 1924. He was buried in Woodlawn Cemetery, Everett, Massachusetts.

== See also ==
- 119th Massachusetts General Court (1898)

U.S. House of Representatives
Preceded by William Emerson Barrett	Member of the U.S. House of Representatives from Massachusetts's 7th congressional district March 4, 1899 – March 3, 1913	Succeeded by Michael Francis Phelan
Preceded by William F. Murray	Member of the U.S. House of Representatives from Massachusetts's 9th congressional district March 4, 1913 – March 3, 1917	Succeeded by Alvan T. Fuller
