= John S. Cate =

American politician

Mayor of Everett, Massachusetts
- In office 1897–1898
- Preceded by: John D. Henderson
- Succeeded by: Francis E. Dyer
- In office 1895–1896
- Preceded by: Francis Batchelder
- Succeeded by: John D. Henderson

Member of the Everett, Massachusetts Board of Selectmen
- In office 1887–1889
- Preceded by: Frank P. Bennett
- Succeeded by: Charles H. Spencer

Member of the Massachusetts House of Representatives
- In office 1890–1890
- Preceded by: Joseph H. Cannell
- Succeeded by: Frank P. Bennett

Personal details
- Born: March 25, 1839 Tamworth, New Hampshire
- Died: October 11, 1906 (aged 67) West Ossipee, New Hampshire
- Party: Republican

John S. Cate (March 25, 1839 – October 11, 1906) was an American business executive and politician who served as a member of the Massachusetts House of Representatives, a member of the Board of Selectmen, and as Mayor of Everett, Massachusetts.

== Early life ==
Cate was born on March 25, 1839, in Tamworth, New Hampshire.

== Business career ==
Cate was engaged in the manufacture of roofing materials, and was also involved in the real estate business.

== Political offices ==
From 1887 to 1889 Cate served as a member of the Everett, Massachusetts Board of Selectmen. In 1889 Cate was elected as a Republican, (over Independent Republican Thomas Leavitt who had earlier lost the Republican nomination to Cate), to the Massachusetts House of Representatives. In the legislature of 1899 Cate served on the Committee on Street Railways.

== Death ==
Cate died, on October 11, 1906, at his summer home in West Ossipee, New Hampshire.
