= Harris C. Hartwell =

American politician

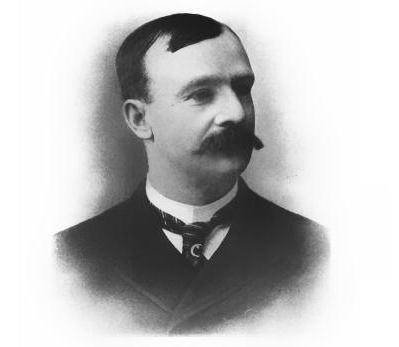

55th President of the Massachusetts Senate
- In office 1889–1889
- Preceded by: Halsey J. Boardman
- Succeeded by: Henry Harrison Sprague

Member of the Massachusetts Senate
- In office 1887–1889

Member of the Massachusetts House of Representatives
- In office 1883–1885

Member of the Fitchburg, Massachusetts School Committee
- In office 1874–1878

Personal details
- Born: December 28, 1847 Groton, Massachusetts
- Died: December 9, 1891 (aged 43) Fitchburg, Massachusetts
- Party: Republican
- Spouse(s): Effie M. F. Nedham, m. October 23, 1877.
- Children: Norcross N. Hartwell; Harold H. Hartwell.
- Education: Harvard College

Harris C. Hartwell (December 28, 1847 – December 9, 1891) was a Massachusetts lawyer and politician who served in the Massachusetts House of Representatives, and as a member and President of, the Massachusetts Senate.

== Family life ==
Hartwell married Effie M. F. Nedham of Groton, Massachusetts on October 23, 1877. They had two children Norcross N. Hartwell; and Harold H. Hartwell.

== See also ==
- 109th Massachusetts General Court (1888)
- 110th Massachusetts General Court (1889)

Political offices
Preceded by Halsey J. Boardman	55th President of the Massachusetts Senate; 1889	Succeeded by Henry Harrison Sprague
