= Marcus M. Merritt =

American politician

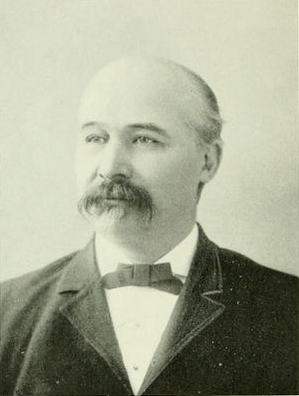

Member of the Massachusetts House of Representatives 26th Middlesex District
- In office 1894–1899

Member of the Massachusetts House of Representatives
- In office 1892–1892

Member of the Massachusetts House of Representatives
- In office 1894–1899

Member of the Chelsea, Massachusetts Board of Aldermen
- In office 1891–1891

Member of the Chelsea, Massachusetts Common Council
- In office 1879–1882

Personal details
- Born: April 1, 1839 Templeton, Massachusetts
- Died: January 16, 1916 (aged 76) Chelsea, Massachusetts
- Party: Democratic
- Profession: Chair manufacturer, tobacco manufacturer

Marcus M. Merritt (1839-1916) was an American businessman and politician who served in both branches of the Chelsea, Massachusetts city council, and as a Member of the Massachusetts House of Representatives.
