= Frank P. Bennett =

American politician

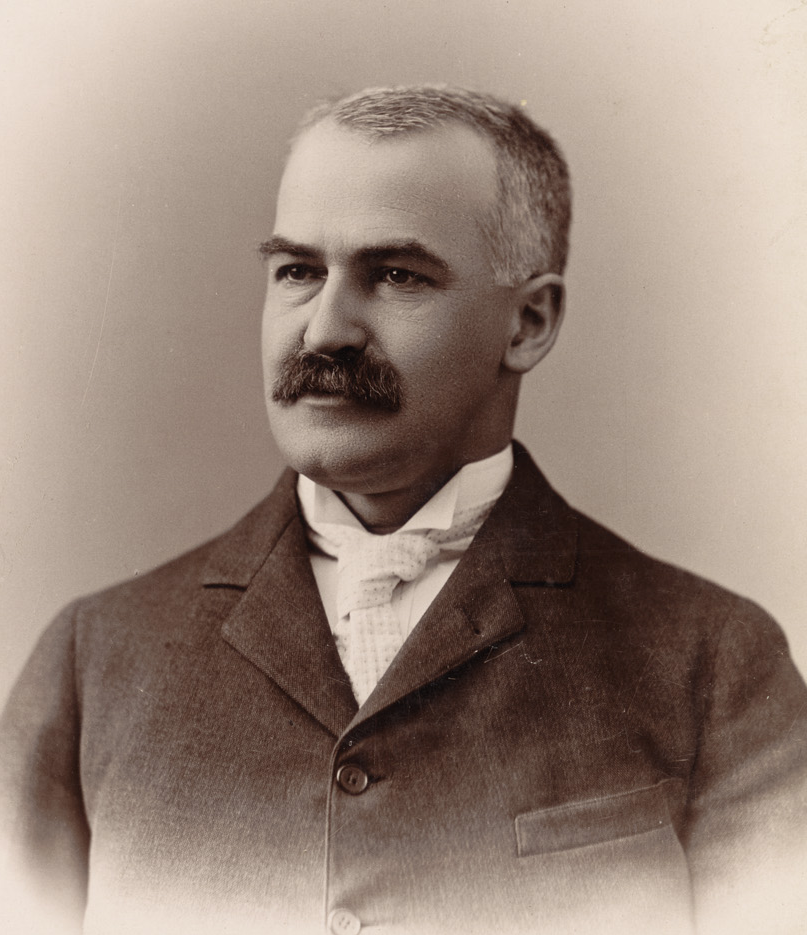

Member of the Massachusetts House of Representatives 14th Essex District
- In office 1903–1903
- Preceded by: Warren P. Babb
- Succeeded by: Frank P. Bennett, Jr.
- In office 1898–1900
- Succeeded by: Warren P. Babb

Member of the Massachusetts House of Representatives
- In office 1891–1893

Member of the Everett, Massachusetts Board of Selectmen
- In office 1887–1889
- Preceded by: Harden Palmer
- Succeeded by: John S. Cate

Personal details
- Born: May 2, 1853 Cambridge, Massachusetts, US
- Died: February 8, 1933 (aged 79) Stoneham, Massachusetts, US
- Party: Republican
- Spouse: Nancy L. Greeley
- Children: Frank P. Bennett, Jr.
- Occupation: Journalist, magazine publisher

Frank P. Bennett (May 2, 1853 – February 8, 1933) was an American journalist, magazine publisher and politician who served as a member of the Massachusetts House of Representatives, and as a member of the Everett, Massachusetts Board of Selectmen.

== Early life ==
Bennett was born to Levi W. Bennett and Kezia C. Bennett on May 2, 1853 in the North Cambridge neighborhood of Cambridge, Massachusetts. When he was young, Bennett's family moved to South Malden, Massachusetts (later known as Everett). He attended public schools in Malden and graduated from Chelsea High School in 1870.

== Publishing ==
Bennett's involvement in publishing began when he worked for newspapers in Boston. He then traveled the country as a journeyman printer and established a small newspaper in Northern Michigan. He later returned to Boston to work for Curtis Guild, Sr. (father of Governor Curtis Guild, Jr.), who published the market edition of the Boston Commercial Bulletin. He then worked for the Boston Daily Advertiser as an editorial writer. He was widely known for his writings on finance and tariffs. In 1887, Bennett retired from the Advertiser.

He founded Frank P. Bennett & Co., which published trade papers, including the American Wool Reporter, later known as the American Wood and Cotton Reporter. In 1891, the company launched the financial publication United States Investor. Along with publishing the magazine, the firm also established an investment information service, run by his son Frank P. Bennett. Jr., that performed research for a fee. In 1895, Bennett's firm was sued by the New York-based William B. Dana Company, which charged that United States Investor's new financial supplement consisted largely of copyrighted content from Dana's The Commercial and Financial Chronicle. "The Chronicle's injunction was granted [by the U.S. Circuit Court for the District of Massachusetts], protecting the copyright. The case is considered an important one because it has been deemed almost impossible heretofore to protect publications like those of The Chronicle," wrote the Library of Congress' Copyright Office in 1980. United States Investor was published at least through 1921.

== Political offices ==
=== Everett ===
From 1886 to 1887 Bennett served as a member of the Everett Board of Selectmen. Bennett was a Republican member of the Massachusetts House of Representatives representing Everett from 1891 to 1894. During his tenure in the House, Bennett was gained a reputation for determinedly opposing any policy he found questionable.

=== Saugus ===
In 1894, Bennett moved to Saugus, Massachusetts, and soon became active in town affairs. He served as Town Moderator and on the Board of Selectmen and School Committee. In 1898 he was elected to the Massachusetts House of Representatives. He was a candidate for Speaker of the House in 1900. He ran an aggressive campaign for the position, but was defeated by James J. Myers. In 1903, Bennett returned to the House with the intent of succeeding Myers as Speaker when he retired. That year, Bennett served as Chairman of the House Ways and Means Committee and was a considered a frontrunner to succeed Myers in the next legislative session. However, Bennett decided not to run for reelection and was succeeded by his son, Frank Jr.

In 1904, Bennett unsuccessfully challenged incumbent Ernest W. Roberts for the Republican nomination in Massachusetts's 7th congressional district.

== Personal life and death ==
Bennett married Nancy L. Greeley of Palermo, Maine. They had three children: Frank, Jr., E. Howard, and C. Randolph.

Bennett was a Universalist and served as the President of the Massachusetts State Convention of Universalist Churches and the Universalist General Convention of the United States.

Bennett died on February 8, 1933, at the New England Sanitarium in Stoneham, Massachusetts.
