= Henry H. Sprague =

American politician

Henry Harrison Sprague
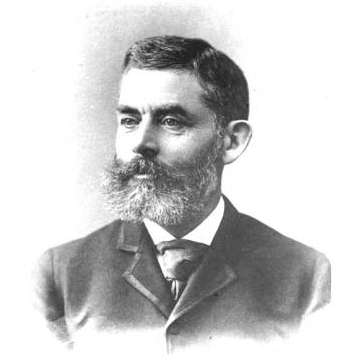

President of the Massachusetts Senate
- In office 1890–1891
- Preceded by: Harris C. Hartwell
- Succeeded by: Alfred S. Pinkerton

Member of the Massachusetts Senate Fifth Suffolk District
- In office 1888–1891
- Preceded by: Edward P. Wilbur
- Succeeded by: Henry Parkman

Member of the Massachusetts House of Representatives
- In office 1884–1884

Member of the Massachusetts House of Representatives
- In office 1881–1883

Member of the Boston Common Council
- In office 1874–1876

Personal details
- Born: August 1, 1841 Athol, Massachusetts
- Died: July 28, 1920 (aged 78) Boston, Massachusetts
- Resting place: Mount Auburn Cemetery
- Spouse: Charlotte Sprague Ward
- Education: Harvard College, 1864
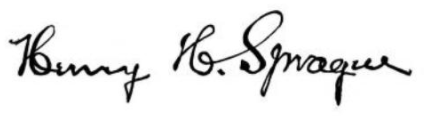
- Signature

Henry Harrison Sprague (August 1, 1841 – July 28, 1920) was a Massachusetts lawyer and politician who served as a member of the Boston, Massachusetts Common Council, in the Massachusetts House of Representatives, and as a member, and President of the Massachusetts Senate.

He died at his home in Boston on July 28, 1920, and was buried at Mount Auburn Cemetery.

== See also ==
- 109th Massachusetts General Court (1888)
- 111th Massachusetts General Court (1890)

Political offices
Preceded by Harris C. Hartwell	President of the Massachusetts Senate; 1890-1891	Succeeded by Alfred S. Pinkerton
