= Edwin Francis Lyford =

American politician

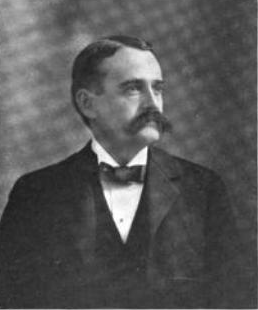

Member of the Massachusetts State Senate 1st Hampden District
- In office 1894–1894
- Majority: 1,438

Member of the Massachusetts House of Representatives 7th Hampden District
- In office 1892–1893
- Majority: 571 (November 1892 election)

Member of the Springfield, Massachusetts City Council
- In office 1885–1886

Personal details
- Born: September 8, 1857 Waterville, Maine
- Died: October 15, 1929 (aged 72) Springfield, Massachusetts
- Party: Republican
- Education: Colby University, A.B., 1877, M.A. 1882
- Profession: Lawyer

Edwin Francis Lyford (September 8, 1857 – October 15, 1929) was an American lawyer and politician who served on the Springfield, Massachusetts, city council, as a member of the Massachusetts House of Representatives and in the Massachusetts State Senate.

== Early life ==
Lyford was born on September 8, 1857, in Waterville, Maine, to Moses and Mary L. (Dyer) Lyford.

=== Education ===
Lyford attended the Coburn Classical Institute and Colby University, from which he graduated with an A.B. degree in 1877, and a M.A. in 1882.

== Early career ==
After he graduated from Colby University, Lyford worked in the Waterville, Maine, law offices of Hon. Reuben Foster. Lyford also worked as a teacher while he lived in Waterville, teaching in the local schools and at Colby University. Lyford was admitted to the Maine Bar in 1879. In 1882 Lyford moved to Springfield and was admitted to the Massachusetts Bar in that year.

== Springfield city council ==
Lyford was a member of the Springfield city council for two years in 1885 and 1886.

== Massachusetts legislature ==
=== Massachusetts House of Representatives ===
In 1892-1893 Lyford represented the Seventh Hampden District in the Massachusetts House of Representatives. In the House of 1892 Lyford was the Clerk of Committee on Cities and the Chairman of House Committee on Probate and Insolvency. Lyford was also on the Committee on Constitutional Amendments in the House of 1893. Lyford was the Chairman of Special Committee to investigate the Bay State Gas Company.

=== Massachusetts Senate ===
In 1894 Lyford served in the Massachusetts State Senate representing the First Hampden District. While in the Senate, Lyford was the Chairman of committee on probate and insolvency, and on the committees on judiciary and taxation, and special committee on revision of corporation laws, also chairman of the special committee on the unemployed, 1894.

== Death ==
Lyford died at his home in Springfield on October 15, 1929.
