= Jeremiah J. Crowley =

American Catholic priest

Jeremiah J. Crowley (Ireland, November 20, 1861 — Chicago, August 10, 1927) was an American Catholic priest who later became an anti-Catholic writer.

He was educated at St. Finbarr's in Cork, and St. Patrick's, Carlow College, he was ordained aged 24 by Bishop James Lynch for Cork. Crowley was accepted into the Chicago diocese by archbishop of Chicago Patrick Feehan in 1896, but fell out with him and opposed his successor James Edward Quigley.

On October 26, 1901, Crowley was excommunicated by a decree of the then Apostolic Pro-Delegate Cardinal Sebastiano Martinelli. Crowley contested his excommunication, stating, "I retired voluntarily, gladly, from the priesthood of Rome, after a vain attempt, in combination with other priests, to secure a reform of Romanistic abuses from within ... This failing, no other course was open but to quit the accursed System forever ... I will give TEN THOUSAND DOLLARS to any person who can prove that I was EXCOMMUNICATED and that the STATEMENTS AND CHARGES against priests, prelates, and popes, in my books ... are untrue; and furthermore, I will agree to hand over the plates of these books and stop their publication forever." Crowley's heretical behavior would have qualified for a latae sententiae excommunication based on contemporary canon law.

Crowley published three books in his lifetime:

- The Parochial School: A Curse to the Church (1905)
- Romanism: A Menace to the Nation (1912)
- The Pope, Chief of White Slavers, High Priest of Intrigue (1913)

Jeremiah J. Crowley is buried in Schuyler Cemetery in Schuyler, Colfax County, Nebraska.

== Bibliography ==
- Jeremiah J. Crowley (November 1, 1906). "Part II - Chapter I - The Parochial School: a Course to the Church - a Menace to the Nation". Romanism a menace to the nation (a new and original work) together with my former book "The parochial school, a curse to the church, a menace to the nation. pp. 234, 221. Archived from the original on June 5, 2021 – via Internet Archive.
- Jeremiah J. Crowley (1913). The Pope, Chief of White Slavers, High Priest of Intrigue.
