= Charles H. Baker =

American politician (1847–1919)

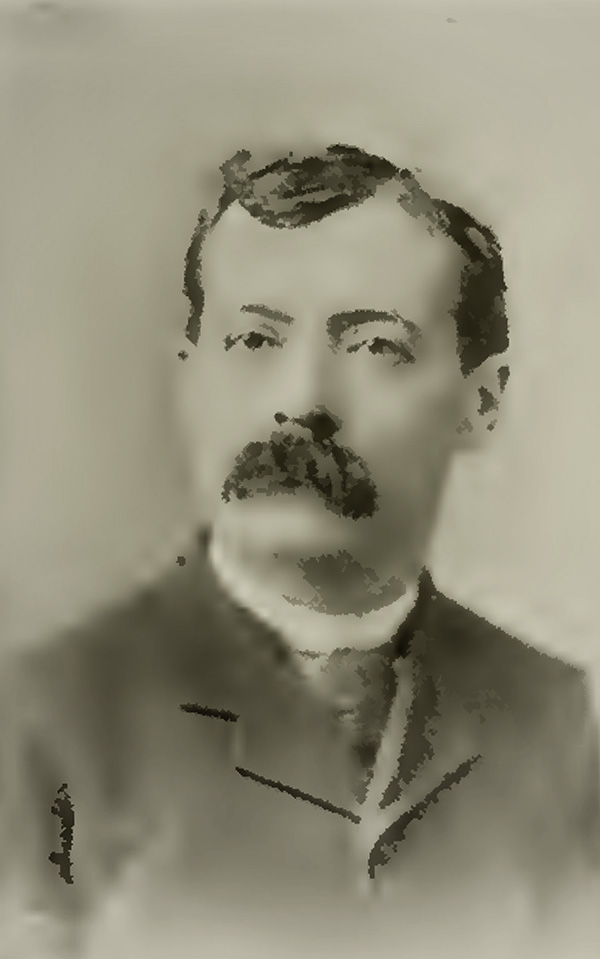

Member of the Massachusetts Senate from the First Essex district
- In office 1892–1894

Member of the Massachusetts House of Representatives from the 10th Essex district
- In office 1883–1884, 1890–1892

Personal details
- Born: February 2, 1847 Solon, Maine
- Died: August 1, 1919 (aged 72) Lynn, Massachusetts
- Party: Republican

Charles H. Baker (February 2, 1847 – August 1, 1919) was a Massachusetts state senator (1892–1894) and state representative (1883–1884, 1890–1892). He was a Republican from Lynn, Massachusetts.

== Biography ==
Baker was born February 2, 1847, in Solon, Maine. As a child he moved with his parents to South Weymouth, Massachusetts. During the Civil War he served as a military drummer boy in the 4th Regiment Massachusetts Volunteer Heavy Artillery. After the war he moved to Lynn, where he began working at a shoe factory. After some time he set out on his own, and by the 1890s was a partner in Baker & Creighton, a large-scale manufacturer of shoes. He was a member of the fraternal organization Grand Army of the Republic, and served as commander of the organization in 1883.

In 1880 Baker was elected to the Lynn Common Council, and in 1881 and 1882 he was elected to the Lynn Board of Aldermen. He served a term in the Massachusetts House of Representatives from 1883 to 1884, representing the 10th Essex district. He was again elected as a Lynn aldermen in 1888, then served two more terms in the House from 1890 to 1892, where he served on the Joint Committee on Manufactures.

He was then elected to the Massachusetts Senate, where he represented the 1st Essex district for two terms (1892–1894). For both terms he was chairman of the Joint Committee on Manufactures. He was also a member of the Committee on Labor and Public Service during his first term and the Committee on Drainage and Rapid Transit during his second term.

== See also ==
- 114th Massachusetts General Court (1893)
