= Isaac Rosnosky =

American businessman and politician (1846–1909)

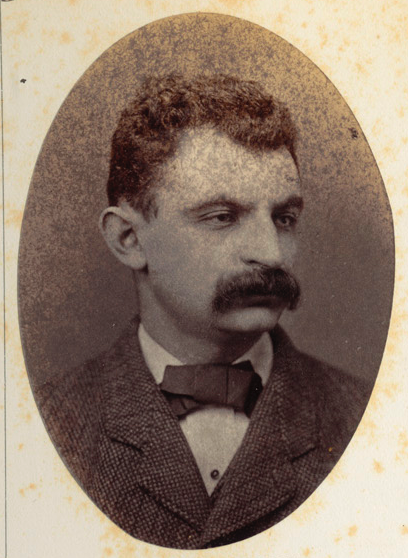
- Born: November 6, 1846; Wollstein, Kingdom of Prussia
- Died: February 12, 1909 (aged 62); Boston, Massachusetts, United States
- Resting place: Temple Ohabei Shalom Cemetery, Boston
- Occupations: Businessman, politician
- Known for: First Jew elected to the Boston Common Council and the Massachusetts House of Representatives
- Spouse: Henrietta Verdoner (m. 1869)
- Children: 6

Isaac Rosnosky (November 6, 1846 – February 12, 1909) was a Prussian-born Jewish-American businessman and politician from Boston. He was the first Jew to be elected to the Boston City Council or the Massachusetts state legislature.

== Life ==
Rosnosky was born on November 6, 1846 in Wollstein, Prussia, the son of Henry Rosnosky and Selda Schmule.

Rosnosky left school when he was eleven to learn the tailoring trade. He immigrated to America in 1861 and settled in Boston. He began working for clothing manufacturer Lewis H. Clark in 1863, and in 1867 he became a partner in the business. He retired from the business in 1893. He was a delegate to the 1880 Democratic National Convention and an alternate delegate to the 1888 Democratic National Convention.

Rosnosky served in the Boston Common Council from 1878 to 1879, 1881, 1884 to 1885, and 1889 to 1890. In the 1879 session, he was chairman of the Committee on Improved Sewage that built part of the sewer under South Bay. In the 1881 session, he introduced an order to take water from Lake Winnipiseogee in New Hampshire and use it to increase the Boston water supply at a cost of fifty million dollars. He served in the Massachusetts House of Representatives in 1880 and from 1891 to 1894. In the 1891 session, he successfully passed a bill to contribute $10,000 to the Carney Hospital and introduced a bill to annex Cambridge to Boston as part of the Greater Boston project. In the 1892 session, he introduced a bill to establish a commission to examine the Boston water supply, and in 1893 the State Board Of Health recommended such a commission. In the 1893 session, he secured a statute change to legalize all Jewish marriages, authorize all rabbis to marry, and make Jewish divorces not legal unless passed on by the courts. Mayor Patrick Collins later appointed him assistant water commissioner, an office he was then reappointed to by Mayor John F. Fitzgerald and served until his death.

Rosnosky was the first Jew to serve in either the Boston Common Council or the Massachusetts House of Representatives. He served as president of Temple Ohabei Shalom from 1882 to at least 1905. He was a member of the Association of Past Presidents of the I. O. B. B., having served as president of District No. 1 of B'nai B'rith in 1891. He was a delegate to the B'nai B'rith Constitution Grand Lodge six times. He was also director of the Hebrew Benevolent Society and a member of the Free Sons of Israel and the Freemasons.

Rosnosky married Henrietta Verdoner in 1869. Their children were Sadie, Lillie, Walter, Morris, Ray, and Eva.

Rosnosky died at home on February 12, 1909. Rabbi Menahem Max Eichler and Rev. Erwin Wolkowich conducted the funeral service at Temple Ohabei Shalom, with Eichler delivering the eulogy. The honorary pallbearers included Abraham C. Ratshesky, Joseph H. O'Neil, and James Donovan. He was buried in the family lot in Temple Ohabei Shalom Cemetery in East Boston.
