= Robert Howard (unionist) =

American politician (1845–1902)

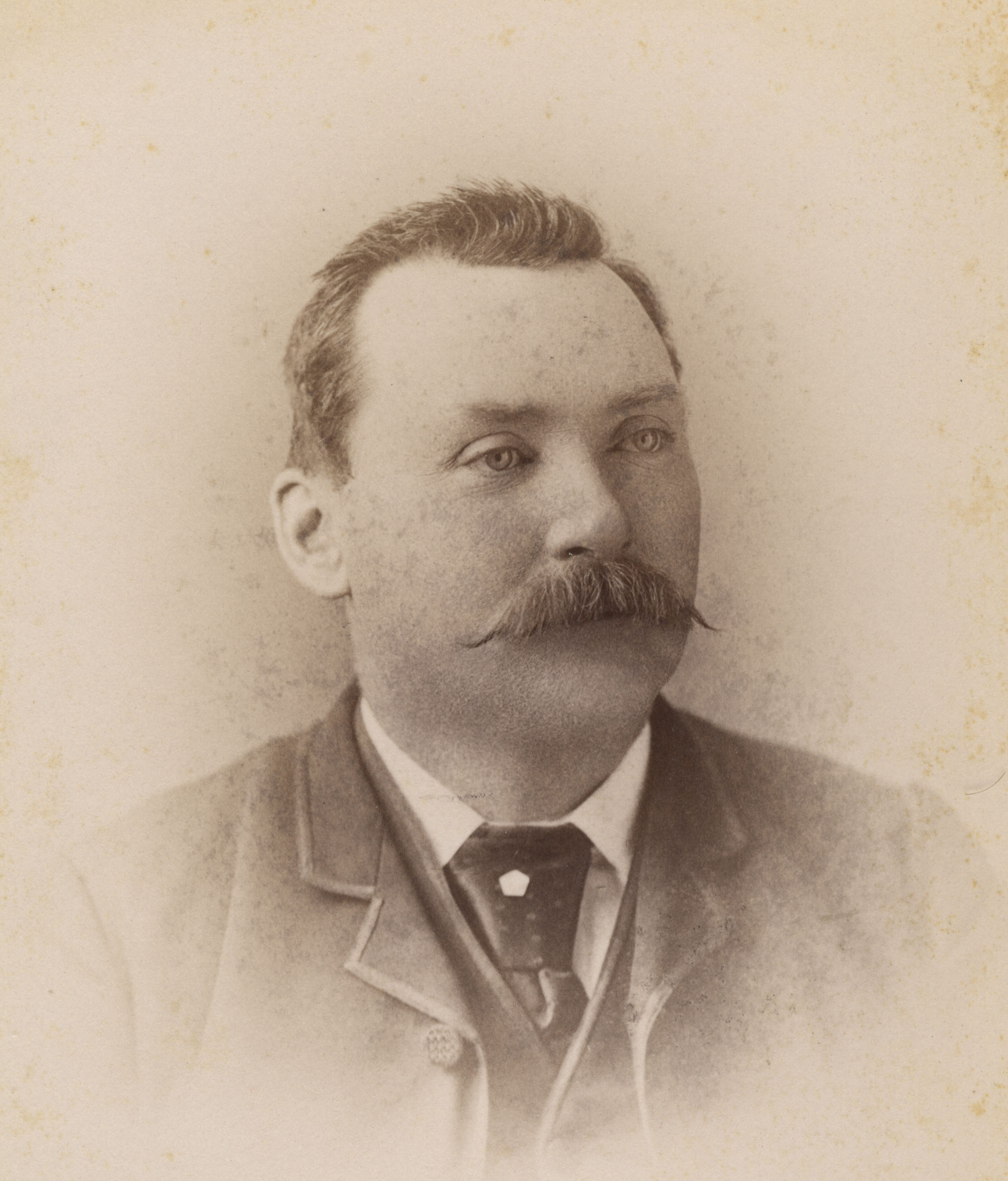
Howard, in 1890

Robert Howard (February 8, 1845 – 1902) was a British-born American labor union leader and politician.

Born in Nantwich, in Cheshire, to parents from Ireland, Howard began working as a piercer in a silk mill in Macclesfield when only 8 years old. When he was 10, he moved to Stockport, to work with bobbins in a cotton mill. Five years later, he became a spinner, and at the age of 25, he became president of the local trade union of spinners. As the leader of the union, he sought to avoid strikes through negotiation, and campaigned for a maximum nine-hour working day. He was offered a position as an overseer, but declined it, as he did not want a management position.

In 1873, Howard emigrated to the United States, settling in Fall River, Massachusetts. He continued to work as a spinner, initially in the Flint Mill. In 1878, he was elected as secretary of the Fall River Spinners' Association. The union had been in financial difficulties, but Howard resolved this by increasing membership. He was so successful, that from 1879, he was able to work full-time in the role. He was also active in the Amalgamated Mule Spinners' Association, serving as its leader from 1878 until 1887. He started a campaign for a maximum ten-hour working day in Rhode Island, which was passed into law in 1885.

In 1880, Howard was elected to the Massachusetts House of Representatives, nominated by both parties. He focused on supporting the labor movement, and did not re-stand at the next election. In 1882, he was elected as treasurer of the national Federation of Organized Trades and Labor Unions, standing down in 1885. The following year, he was elected to the Massachusetts Senate in the Bristol 2nd District, as a Democrat. He served in the Senate until 1893, and remained leader of the Fall River Spinners until 1897, by then part of the Knights of Labor.

Trade union offices
Preceded by Alexander C. Rankin	Treasurer of the Federation of Organized Trades and Labor Unions; 1882–1885	Succeeded by Gabriel Edmonston
