= Hitchings =

Hitchings is a surname. Notable people with the surname include:

- Alfred Percy Hitchings (1912–1979), English racing driver
- Benjamin Hitchings Jr. (1813–1893), American shoe manufacturer and politician
- Charles S. Hitchings (1844–1894), American shoe manufacturer and politician
- Gavin Hitchings (1937–2018), New Zealand jeweler
- George H. Hitchings (1905-1998), American doctor who shared the 1988 Nobel Prize in Physiology
- Helen Hitchings (1920–2002), New Zealand art dealer
- Henry Hitchings (born 1974), British author, reviewer and critic
- John B. Hitchings (1815–1887), American shoe manufacturer and politician
- Otis M. Hitchings (1822–1894), American shoe manufacturer and politician
- Lionel Hitchings (born 1936), English cricketer
- Tracy Hitchings (1962–2022), English musician

== See also ==
- Hitching (disambiguation)
- Hitchin (disambiguation)
