= Mifflin v. R. H. White Co. =

- Supreme Court of the United States

Argued April 30 – May 1, 1903 Decided June 1, 1903
- Full case name: Mifflin v. R. H. White Company
- Citations: 190 U.S. 260 (more) 23 S. Ct. 769; 47 L. Ed. 1040

Holding
- The authorized appearance of a work in a magazine without a copyright notice specifically dedicated to that work transfers that work into the public domain.

Court membership
- Chief Justice Melville Fuller Associate Justices John M. Harlan · David J. Brewer; Henry B. Brown · Edward D. White; Rufus W. Peckham · Joseph McKenna; Oliver W. Holmes Jr. · William R. Day

Case opinion
- Majority: Brown, joined by unanimous

Mifflin v. R. H. White Co., 190 U.S. 260 (1903), was a United States Supreme Court case in which the Court held that the authorized appearance of a work in a magazine without a copyright notice specifically dedicated to that work transfers that work into the public domain. Its opinion was also applied to the next case, Mifflin v. Dutton.

== Background ==
The case concerned The Professor at the Breakfast-Table by Oliver Wendell Holmes Sr., published serially in Atlantic Monthly in 1859 without the appropriate copyright notice. The works were later published in a single volume by Houghton Mifflin Co. with payment to Holmes but the R. H. White store also published the same volume claiming it was in the public domain.

Holmes v. Hurst was an earlier Supreme Court case dealing with similar circumstances for Holmes's earlier work, The Autocrat of the Breakfast-Table.
