= George Sweetser =

George Sweetser may refer to:

- George A. Sweetser (1872–1961), American lawyer and horticulturist
- George H. Sweetser (1823–1870), American tobacco manufacturer and politician
