= Samuel Hawkes (disambiguation) =

Samuel Hawkes (1816–1903) was an American politician.

Samuel Hawkes may also refer to:

- Samuel Hawkes (missionary), British missionary whose memorial is at the Trinity College Chapel, Cambridge
- Samuel Hawkes (Australian politician), member of the Tasmanian House of Assembly, 1886–1891 and 1891-1893
