= John Backup =

State legislator

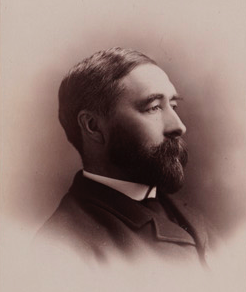

Member of the Massachusetts House of Representatives
- In office 1888

Personal details
- Party: Independent Republican

John Backup was an American politician. He was a state legislator in Massachusetts. An Independent Republican, he served in the Massachusetts House of Representatives in 1888. He lived in Boston.

== See also ==
- 1888 Massachusetts legislature
- William Davies Sohier
