= Charles S. Hitchings =

American slipper manufacturer and politician

Member of the Massachusetts House of Representatives
- In office 1886–1887
- Preceded by: John H. Town
- Succeeded by: Horace H. Atherton

Personal details
- Born: April 21, 1844 Saugus, Massachusetts
- Died: December 12, 1894 (aged 50) Saugus, Massachusetts
- Resting place: Riverside Cemetery; Saugus, Massachusetts
- Party: Democratic
- Relations: Charles Sweetser (grandfather); John B. Hitchings (father); Benjamin Hitchings Jr. (uncle); Otis M. Hitchings (uncle); George H. Sweetser (uncle); Albert H. Sweetser (cousin)
- Occupation: Shoe manufacturer

Charles Sweetser Hitchings (April 21, 1844 – December 12, 1894) was an American shoe manufacturer and politician whose election to the Massachusetts House of Representatives was contested due to irregularities.

== Early life ==
Hitchings was born on April 21, 1844, to John B. and Zeruiah (Sweetser) Hitchings.

== Business ==
Hitchings began manufacturing shoes in 1867. In 1879, Hitchings purchased Walton & Wilson, and he moved his business to their three-story factory located on the corner of Central and Pearson Streets. He employed as many as 50 people and at one point produced around 1,500 hand-made slippers annually for sale in New England and New York. He also grew strawberries, producing about 1,200 a year.

== Politics ==
In 1885, Hitchings defeated Charles H. Mansfield 368 votes to 364 for the 13th Essex district seat in the Massachusetts House of Representatives. Mansfield contested the election, alleging that Hitchings had received votes from men who resided outside of the district or had not paid the poll tax. An investigation by the House Committee on Elections found that one man who resided outside the district had indeed cast a ballot for Hitchings and 50 voters in Saugus had been registered after the deadline to do so had passed and without performing a literacy test. Of these 50 voters, 32 were believed to have voted in the election. The committee voted in favor of a resolution to declare the seat vacant and call for a new election, however the House voted in favor of a substitute resolution that stated that it did not appear that the illegally cast votes would have changed the result of the election. Hitchings was reelected in 1886, this time in the 20th Essex District due to redistricting.
