= Lafayette City Center =

Coordinates: 42.3547°N 71.0602°W

The LaFayette Place Mall is an urban shopping mall and mixed-use complex in downtown Boston. It is now named Lafayette City Center.

== Creation and failure ==
The complex was built in 1984 on a site which had included the old R. H. White department store. R. H. White had occupied an ornate six-floor emporium there from 1876 until going out of business in 1957, after which the building was occupied by the Citymart department store (1962–1966) and Raymond's department store (1966–1972), after which the building was torn down and replaced with a parking lot and then LaFayette Place Mall in 1984.

The original developer was Mondev (Montreal Development). Lafayette Place originally had a 500-room hotel (originally Hotel Lafayette, later a Swissôtel and then a Hyatt) with 300,000 square feet (28,000 m^{2}) of retail space. The project to build the mall also included an adjacent new downtown flagship store for Jordan Marsh (now a Macy's store). Located at the less desirable, more decayed end of the downtown shopping district (the same factor that had helped doom R. H. White, Citymart, and Raymond's, along with the continued flight of customers to suburban shopping malls), it never achieved greater than 60 percent occupancy. The interior mall had an unusual circular hallway arrangement which never became popular with shoppers. The long solid-brick facade presented a foreboding, lifeless aspect to pedestrians. It closed as a mall in 1989, ownership devolved to Chemical Bank, and the retail space remained empty for some years.

One doesn't know quite where to begin in castigating this lemon. From the outside it is ashen and depressing almost beyond credibility ... Layfayette Place turns a gray shoulder to the street, looking more like a prison than a row of storefronts.

— Robert Campbell, Boston Globe

Lafayette Place, born in distress, made a kind of sense. Around a safe, clean interior Mitchell/Giurgola architects mounted a brutal gray bunker, its ashen-gray walls serving as an unadorned defensive perimeter against dangerous Combat Zone streets. But Boston's recovery would soon help alter an entire city's view of its streets ... Lafayette Place proves how a building with about the worst approach to its street fronts in the city will be punished by a citizenry that has come to expect more.

— Mark Muro, Boston Globe

== Later developments ==
Homart Development Company worked on redeveloping the property and reopening the mall in 1990s. Patriot Games LLC, a consortium of three companies, bought the property in 1997. Two stories were added and the complex was redeveloped as primarily office space, under the name Lafayette Corporate Center. State Street Corporation was an anchor tenant, leasing 435,000 square feet (40,400 m^{2}). Patriot Games sold the property in 2002 to The Abbey Group.

State Street Corporation left in the 2010s for offices in the Fort Point Channel area. With the downtown shopping area showing new signs of vitality and a burgeoning resident population nearby, Abbey Group in 2014 redeveloped the complex, revived the retail space, and rebranded the complex as Lafayette City Center.
