= The Minister's Wooing =

1859 novel by Harriet Beecher Stowe

- First UK edition
- Author: Harriet Beecher Stowe
- Language: English
- Genre: Historical novel
- Publisher: Derby & Jackson (US); Sampson Low Son & Co (UK)
- Publication date: 1859 (1st ed.)
- Publication place: United States
- Media type: Print (hard~ & paperback) or serial
- Pages: 578 pp (1st ed.); 349 pp (Penguin paperback, 1999)
- ISBN: 0-14-043702-9 (Penguin paperback)
- OCLC: 40698698
- Dewey Decimal: 813/.3 21
- LC Class: PS2954.M5 S76 1999

The Minister's Wooing is a historical novel by Harriet Beecher Stowe, first published in 1859. Set in 18th-century Newport, Rhode Island, the novel explores New England history, highlights the issue of slavery, and critiques the Calvinist theology in which Stowe was raised. Due to similarities in setting, comparisons are often drawn between this work and Nathaniel Hawthorne's The Scarlet Letter (1850). However, in contrast to Hawthorne's The Scarlett Letter, The Minister's Wooing is a "sentimental romance"; its central plot revolves around courtship and marriage. Moreover, Stowe's exploration of the regional history of New England deals primarily with the domestic sphere, the New England response to slavery, and the psychological impact of the Calvinist doctrines of predestination and disinterested benevolence.

With its intense focus upon the history, customs, and mannerisms of New England, The Minister's Wooing is one sense an example of the local color writing that proliferated in late 19th century. However, because Stowe also highlighted the issue of slavery, this time in the North, this novel is related to her earlier anti-slavery novels. Finally, the work serves as a critique of Calvinism, written from the perspective of an individual deeply familiar with the theological system.

Stowe's father was well-known Calvinist minister Lyman Beecher. Stowe drew elements of the novel from events in both her and her older sister Catharine Beecher's lives. Throughout the novel, Stowe portrays the reaction of different personality types to the pressures of Calvinist principles, illustrating in this manner what she perceives as Calvinism's strengths and weaknesses. In particular, responding to the untimely death of her sister's fiancé and the deaths of two of her own children, Stowe addresses the issue of predestination. This suggested that individuals were either saved or damned at birth, and only the elect would go to heaven.

== Publication history ==
The Minister's Wooing was first serialized in the Atlantic Monthly, from December 1858 to December 1859. It was published in book form first in England by Sampson Low, Son & Co., in order to guarantee British royalties, and then in the US by Derby and Jackson.

The novel was the subject of a 1909 United States Supreme Court copyright case, Mifflin v. Dutton. The court ruled that the novel's authorized publication in Atlantic Monthly, without the required copyright notices, was a dedication to the public domain.

== Genesis of the novel ==
In 1857, Harriet Stowe's son Henry drowned in the Connecticut River. Like the sailor James in the novel, he was unregenerate at the time of his death. Stowe had first begun to reassess the Calvinist view of salvation after watching her sister Catharine wrestle in 1822 with the similar loss of an unregenerate fiancé. Henry's death spurred further reflection. The grief and doubt which both Harriet and her sister had dealt with inspired the novel. Their experiences are expressed in the character of Mrs. Marvyn.

Some readers, including Stowe's grandson Lyman Beecher Stowe, proclaimed the book to be an assault on Calvinism. Stowe questioned the establishment in which she had been raised, but her journals do not suggest that she intended an attack against this system. She expressed a profound respect and admiration for both Calvinist theology and the individuals who grappled with its doctrines. Her stated intent instead was to point out certain flaws and to spread tolerance.

== Synopsis ==
The story is set in Newport, Rhode Island, when it was still a prosperous fishing and shipping town and not a fashionable retreat for the wealthy. Dr. Hopkins is a 40-year-old minister who falls in love with Mary, the very religious daughter of his hostess in Newport, although Mary is still in love with James Marvyn, a sailor presumed lost at sea.

After a period of mourning, Mary decides to marry Dr. Hopkins. She has other suitors, including Aaron Burr, but she sees that even though he is the grandson of Jonathan Edwards and has been raised in Calvinism, he is mired in evil. James returns from the sea before the wedding and Dr. Hopkins, knowing that he cannot compete with Mary's love for the sailor, calls off the marriage. Mary and James are free to marry and live happily.

== Major characters ==
=== Minister Samuel Hopkins ===
He is an apostle of Jonathan Edwards's "New Divinity." He struggles to maintain his spiritual independence and assert his spiritual authority against the wealthy members of his congregation, who observe church rules rather than living truly Christian lives. He is named for and based on the historical Samuel Hopkins, minister at the First Congregational Church of Newport in the late 18th century. But events of the story are fictional.

=== Mary Scudder ===
This fictional character is partly based on the author's older sister, Catharine Beecher. Mary loved a sailor who has been lost in a shipwreck and is presumed dead. She is a typical Stowe heroine, resigned to her sorrow and bearing her grief as atonement for her sins and those of her lost seaman.

=== James Marvyn ===
Mary's lost sailor. Both Mary and his mother agonize over his fate and his salvation. He was not a Christian and therefore, according to traditional Calvinist theology, irrevocably damned. He eventually returns to Mary. Having survived the shipwreck, his virtue is shown by his having become a Christian and achieved wealth.

=== Mrs. Marvyn ===
James' mother. She is angry with a God who seemed to have destined the death of her unsaved son. Her despair is lifted with the help of Mary and Candace, a free black woman who works as her servant. They convince her that God is love.

== Minor characters ==
=== Candace ===
Mary Scudder's free black servant. Candace's displays of integrity and love toward Mrs. Marvyn speak very highly of her character. Mary treats Candace more as a friend and confidant than a servant.

=== Virginie de Frontignac ===
She is the wife of a French diplomat and she falls in love with Aaron Burr. Mary helps Virginie save her marriage. In return, Virginie helps bring Mary and James together. Virginie is a Roman Catholic and serves as a figure of the religious tolerance that Stowe had begun to embrace by this time in her life.

=== Aaron Burr ===
Based on the real-life Vice President of the United States, Burr is a grandson of Jonathan Edwards. Stowe uses him as an example of some of the ill effects of being raised in Calvinistic fanaticism. Burr attempts to woo Mary as well as Virginie. Mary confronts him with his attempted adultery (pp. 362–63), and he withdraws. But this does not stop him from his "brilliant and unscrupulous political intrigues" and ultimate, total disgrace (p. 428). "Chased from society, pointed at everywhere by the finger of hatred, so accursed in common esteem… one seems to see in a doom so much above that of other men the power of an avenging Nemesis for sins beyond those of ordinary humanity." (p. 428, Hurst & Co. ed.)

=== Miss Prissy Diamond ===
The town dressmaker and busybody. Although James returns to town, Mary believes that she has an obligation to marry Minister Hopkins. Miss Prissy tells the minister about Mary's true love, and he calls off the wedding so that Mary and James are free to marry.

== References and further reading ==
- Adams, John R (1963), Harriet Beecher Stowe, New York: Twayne.
- Bell, Michael Davitt (1995), "Women's Fiction and the Literary Marketplace in the 1850s", in Bercovitch, Sacvan; Patell, Cyrus RK (eds.), The Cambridge History of American Literature, vol. 2, Cambridge, England; New York: Cambridge University Press, pp. 74–123, ISBN 0-521-30106-8.
- Gerson, Noel (1976), Harriet Beecher Stowe, Praeger.
- Harris, Susan K (1993), "The Female Imaginary in Harriet Beecher Stowe's the Minister's Wooing", New England Quarterly, 66 (2): 179–98, doi:10.2307/365843, JSTOR 365843.
- ——— (1999), "Harriet (Elizabeth) Beecher Stowe", Discovering Authors (3.0 ed.), Gale.
- ——— (1999b), "Introduction", in Stowe, Harriet Beecher (ed.), The Minister's Wooing, New York: Penguin, pp. vii–xxiii, ISBN 0-14-043702-9.
- Jackson, Phyllis Wynn (1947), Victorian Cinderella: The Story of Harriet Beecher Stowe, New York: H. Wolff.
- Ramirez, Anne West (Spring 2002), "Harriet Beecher Stowe's Christian Feminism in the Minister's Wooing: A Precedent for Emily Dickinson", Christianity and Literature, 51 (3): 407–24, doi:10.1177/014833310205100305.
- Stowe, Harriet (1896), The Minister's Wooing, Boston and New York: Houghton, Mifflin & Co.
