= List of United States Supreme Court cases, volume 174 =

Supreme Court of the United States
- Interactive map of Supreme Court of the United States
- 38°53′26″N 77°00′16″W
- Established: March 4, 1789; 236 years ago
- Location: Washington, D.C.
- Coordinates: 38°53′26″N 77°00′16″W
- Composition method: Presidential nomination with Senate confirmation
- Authorised by: Constitution of the United States, Art. III, § 1
- Judge term length: life tenure, subject to impeachment and removal
- Number of positions: 9 (by statute)
- Website: supremecourt.gov

This is a list of cases reported in volume 174 of United States Reports, decided by the Supreme Court of the United States in 1899.

== Justices of the Supreme Court at the time of volume 174 U.S. ==
The Supreme Court is established by Article III, Section 1 of the Constitution of the United States, which says: "The judicial Power of the United States, shall be vested in one supreme Court . . .". The size of the Court is not specified; the Constitution leaves it to Congress to set the number of justices. Under the Judiciary Act of 1789 Congress originally fixed the number of justices at six (one chief justice and five associate justices). Since 1789 Congress has varied the size of the Court from six to seven, nine, ten, and back to nine justices (always including one chief justice).

When the cases in volume 174 were decided the Court comprised the following nine members:

Portrait	Justice	Office	Home State	Succeeded	Date confirmed by the Senate (Vote)	Tenure on Supreme Court
	Melville Fuller	Chief Justice	Illinois	Morrison Waite	July 20, 1888 (41–20)	October 8, 1888 – July 4, 1910 (Died)
	John Marshall Harlan	Associate Justice	Kentucky	David Davis	November 29, 1877 (Acclamation)	December 10, 1877 – October 14, 1911 (Died)
	Horace Gray	Associate Justice	Massachusetts	Nathan Clifford	December 20, 1881 (51–5)	January 9, 1882 – September 15, 1902 (Died)
	David Josiah Brewer	Associate Justice	Kansas	Stanley Matthews	December 18, 1889 (53–11)	January 6, 1890 – March 28, 1910 (Died)
	Henry Billings Brown	Associate Justice	Michigan	Samuel Freeman Miller	December 29, 1890 (Acclamation)	January 5, 1891 – May 28, 1906 (Retired)
	George Shiras Jr.	Associate Justice	Pennsylvania	Joseph P. Bradley	July 26, 1892 (Acclamation)	October 10, 1892 – February 23, 1903 (Retired)
	Edward Douglass White	Associate Justice	Louisiana	Samuel Blatchford	February 19, 1894 (Acclamation)	March 12, 1894 – December 18, 1910 (Continued as chief justice)
	Rufus W. Peckham	Associate Justice	New York	Howell Edmunds Jackson	December 9, 1895 (Acclamation)	January 6, 1896 – October 24, 1909 (Died)
	Joseph McKenna	Associate Justice	California	Stephen Johnson Field	January 21, 1898 (Acclamation)	January 26, 1898 – January 5, 1925 (Retired)

== Citation style ==
Under the Judiciary Act of 1789 the federal court structure at the time comprised District Courts, which had general trial jurisdiction; Circuit Courts, which had mixed trial and appellate (from the US District Courts) jurisdiction; and the United States Supreme Court, which had appellate jurisdiction over the federal District and Circuit courts—and for certain issues over state courts. The Supreme Court also had limited original jurisdiction (i.e., in which cases could be filed directly with the Supreme Court without first having been heard by a lower federal or state court). There were one or more federal District Courts and/or Circuit Courts in each state, territory, or other geographical region.

The Judiciary Act of 1891 created the United States Courts of Appeals and reassigned the jurisdiction of most routine appeals from the district and circuit courts to these appellate courts. The Act created nine new courts that were originally known as the "United States Circuit Courts of Appeals." The new courts had jurisdiction over most appeals of lower court decisions. The Supreme Court could review either legal issues that a court of appeals certified or decisions of court of appeals by writ of certiorari.

Bluebook citation style is used for case names, citations, and jurisdictions.

- "# Cir." = United States Court of Appeals
  - e.g., "3d Cir." = United States Court of Appeals for the Third Circuit
- "C.C.D." = United States Circuit Court for the District of . . .
  - e.g.,"C.C.D.N.J." = United States Circuit Court for the District of New Jersey
- "D." = United States District Court for the District of . . .
  - e.g.,"D. Mass." = United States District Court for the District of Massachusetts
- "E." = Eastern; "M." = Middle; "N." = Northern; "S." = Southern; "W." = Western
  - e.g.,"C.C.S.D.N.Y." = United States Circuit Court for the Southern District of New York
  - e.g.,"M.D. Ala." = United States District Court for the Middle District of Alabama
- "Ct. Cl." = United States Court of Claims
- The abbreviation of a state's name alone indicates the highest appellate court in that state's judiciary at the time.
  - e.g.,"Pa." = Supreme Court of Pennsylvania
  - e.g.,"Me." = Supreme Judicial Court of Maine

== List of cases in volume 174 U.S. ==
Case Name	Page & year	Opinion of the Court	Concurring opinion(s)	Dissenting opinion(s)	Lower Court	Disposition
Capital Traction Company v. Hof	1 (1899)	Gray	none	none	D.C. Cir.	affirmed
Metropolitan Railway Company v. Church	46 (1899)	Gray	none	none	D.C. Cir.	affirmed
Kirby v. United States	47 (1899)	Harlan	none	none	D.S.D.	reversed
Cosgrove v. Winney	64 (1899)	Fuller	none	none	E.D. Mich.	reversed
American Refrigerator Transit Company v. Hall	70 (1899)	Shiras	none	none	Colo.	affirmed
Holmes v. Hurst	82 (1899)	Brown	none	none	2d Cir.	affirmed
White v. Leovy	91 (1899)	McKenna	none	none	La.	dismissed
Atchison, Topeka and Santa Fe Railway Company v. Matthews	96 (1899)	Brewer	none	Harlan	Kan.	affirmed
Auten v. United States National Bank	125 (1899)	McKenna	none	none	8th Cir.	affirmed
United States v. One Distillery	149 (1899)	Harlan	none	none	C.C.S.D. Cal.	affirmed
Moran v. Dillingham	153 (1899)	Gray	none	none	5th Cir.	decree quashed
Kimball v. Kimball	158 (1899)	Gray	none	none	Kings County Sur. Ct.	dismissed
Nelson v. Moloney	164 (1899)	Fuller	none	none	N.Y. Sup. Ct.	dismissed
McCain v. City of Des Moines	168 (1899)	Peckham	none	none	C.C.S.D. Iowa	affirmed
Bosworth v. St. Louis et al. Ass'n	182 (1899)	Brewer	none	none	7th Cir.	affirmed
Humphries v. District of Columbia	190 (1899)	Brewer	none	none	D.C. Cir.	reversed
Morris v. United States	196 (1899)	Shiras	none	White	Sup. Ct. D.C.	affirmed
Raton W. Company v. Town of Raton	360 (1899)	Shiras	none	none	Sup. Ct. Terr. N.M.	reversed
Concord First National Bank v. Hawkins	364 (1899)	Shiras	none	none	1st Cir.	reversed
Price v. United States	373 (1899)	Brewer	none	none	Ct. Cl.	affirmed
Northern Pacific Railroad Company v. Freeman	379 (1899)	Brown	none	none	9th Cir.	reversed
United States v. Krall	385 (1899)	White	none	none	9th Cir.	dismissed
Israel v. Gale	391 (1899)	White	none	none	2d Cir.	affirmed
McDonald v. Williams	397 (1899)	Peckham	none	none	2d Cir.	certification
Stone v. Farmers' Bank	409 (1899)	White	none	none	not indicated	affirmed
Stone v. Bank of Commerce	412 (1899)	Peckham	none	none	C.C.D. Ky.	reversed
City of Louisville v. Bank of Commerce	428 (1899)	Peckham	none	none	C.C.D. Ky.	reversed
Fidelity Trust Safety Vault Company v. City of Louisville	429 (1899)	Peckham	none	none	C.C.D. Ky.	affirmed
Third National Bank v. Stone	432 (1899)	White	none	none	C.C.D. Ky.	reversed
City of Louisville v. Third National Bank	435 (1899)	White	none	none	C.C.D. Ky.	affirmed
City of Louisville v. Citizens' National Bank	436 (1899)	White	none	none	C.C.D. Ky.	multiple
First National Bank v. City of Louisville	438 (1899)	White	none	none	C.C.D. Ky.	reversed
City of Louisville v. Bank of Louisville	439 (1899)	White	none	none	C.C.D. Ky.	reversed
Stephens v. Cherokee Nation	445 (1899)	Fuller	none	none	U.S. Ct. Ind. Terr.	affirmed
Office S. Manufacturing Company v. Fenton M. Manufacturing Company	492 (1899)	Brown	none	none	D.C. Cir.	reversed
Wade v. Travis County	499 (1899)	Brown	none	none	5th Cir.	reversed
The Olinde Rodrigues	510 (1899)	Fuller	none	none	D.S.C.	affirmed
Cohn v. Daley	539 (1899)	McKenna	none	none	Sup. Ct. Terr. Ariz.	affirmed
New Mexico v. United States Trust Company	545 (1899)	McKenna	none	none	Sup. Ct. Terr. N.M.	reversed
Louisville et al. Railway Company v. Louisville Trust Company	552 (1899)	Gray	none	none	6th Cir.	multiple
United States v. Coe	578 (1899)	Fuller	none	none	Ct. Priv. Land Cl.	rehearing denied
Missouri–Kansas–Texas Railroad Company v. McCann	580 (1899)	White	none	none	Mo.	affirmed
West Company v. Lea	590 (1899)	White	none	none	4th Cir.	certification
Columbus Construction Company v. Crane Company	600 (1899)	Shiras	none	none	C.C.N.D. Ill.	dismissed
Rio Grande Irrigation and Colonization Company v. Gildersleeve	603 (1899)	Shiras	none	none	Sup. Ct. Terr. N.M.	affirmed
McDonald v. Chemical National Bank	610 (1899)	Shiras	none	none	2d Cir.	affirmed
Northern Pacific Railroad Company v. De Lacey	622 (1899)	Peckham	none	none	9th Cir.	reversed
McMullen v. Hoffman	639 (1899)	Peckham	none	none	9th Cir.	affirmed
United States v. Dudley	670 (1899)	Brown	none	none	2d Cir.	affirmed
Louisville Trust Company v. Louisville et al. Railway Company	674 (1899)	Brewer	none	none	7th Cir.	reversed
United States v. Rio Grande Dam Irrigation Company	690 (1899)	Brewer	none	none	Sup. Ct. Terr. N.M.	reversed
Chicago, Rock Island and Pacific Railroad Company v. Sturm	710 (1899)	McKenna	none	none	Kan.	reversed
Chicago, Rock Island and Pacific Railroad Company v. Campbell	718 (1899)	McKenna	none	none	Kan.	reversed
Davis v. Coblens	719 (1899)	McKenna	none	none	D.C. Cir.	affirmed
Spurr v. United States	728 (1899)	Fuller	none	none	6th Cir.	reversed
San Diego et al. Company v. City of National City	739 (1899)	Harlan	none	none	C.C.S.D. Cal.	affirmed
City of Richmond v. Southern Bell Telephone and Telegraph Company	761 (1899)	Harlan	none	none	4th Cir.	affirmed
Oakes v. United States	778 (1899)	Gray	none	none	Ct. Cl.	affirmed

== See also ==
- Certificate of division
