= Joseph Roby =

American Congregationalist minister

- Born: May 12, 1724; Boston, Massachusetts Colony
- Died: January 31, 1803 (aged 78); Saugus, Massachusetts, U.S.
- Education: Harvard College
- Occupation: Minister
- Spouse(s): Rachel Proctor (1752–1792; her death); Zeruiah Ingols (1792–1803; his death)
- Children: 4 daughters, 3 sons

Joseph Roby (May 12, 1724 – January 31, 1803) was an American Congregationalist minister and supporter of the American Revolution.

== Early life ==
Roby was born on May 12, 1724, in Boston to Joseph and Priscilla Roby. He graduated from Harvard College in 1742 with a Master of Arts degree.

== Ministerial career ==
After becoming a minister, Roby preached in various churches. In December 1748, Roby was invited to become minister of Lynn's Third Parish Church (later Saugus' First Parish Church). On March 1, 1749, members of the Third Parish formed a committee to inform Roby that he had been selected to be their minister. They offered him a house and barn, sixty pounds, a "loose collection", and "pasturing and sufficient winter meat for two cows and one horse, and to put the hay, or winter meat into the barn - the improvement of two acres of land suitable to plant, and to be kept well fenced." After some negotiations it was substantially increased and he would ultimately receive "thirty pounds lawful currency, a house and barn, and pasture and tillage land; twenty cords of wood, sixty bushels of corn, forty-one bushels of rye, six hundred pounds of pork, and eight hundred and eighty pounds of beef", which came to two bushels of grain and twenty-eight pounds of meat per week. He formally accepted the parish's offer on July 25, 1750, and he was ordained and installed as pastor on August 2, 1750.

Roby served as parson of the Third Parish Church for a total of 51 years. During this time he married nearly three hundred couples and was an active member of the community.

== American Revolution ==
Roby viewed the encroachment of the British as just cause for resistance. As the Revolutionary War approached, Roby worked strenuously to strengthen the feeling of independence in his parish. Historian Horace H. Atherton describes Roby as being "instrumental" in seeing that Saugus sent a large representation to participate in the war.

On the morning of April 19, 1775, Roby and sixty-two other men from the Third Parish met at Jacob Newhall's tavern and proceeded to Lexington to fight in the Battles of Lexington and Concord. Four days after the conflict, a Lynn town meeting voted to create a Committee of Safety. Roby was one of three men appointed to serve on it. The next Sunday Roby followed the Massachusetts Provincial Congress' advice that all men residing within twenty miles of the coast go to church armed and appeared at the pulpit with a musket under one arm and his sermon under the other.

When peace was established between the United States and Great Britain, Roby was one of the first to advocate for cordial relations between the two countries.

== Personal life ==
On February 13, 1752, Roby published an intention to marry Mrs. Rachel Proctor of Boston and they were married April 13, 1752 at the New North Church in Boston. Rev. Andrew Eliot performed the ceremony. The Robys had four daughters – Rachel, Mary, Elizabeth, and Sarah, and three sons – Joseph, Henry, and Thomas. Their eldest son, Joseph, was a participant in the Boston Tea Party. Their two other sons served in Captain Samuel King's company during the Revolutionary War. After the war, Thomas followed in his father's footsteps and became a member of the clergy. He was the first minister of Otisfield, Maine.

The Robys also took in a homeless girl by the name of Zeruiah Ingols, whom they raised as a daughter. The Robys remained married until Rachel's death on March 18, 1792. On August 7, 1792, Roby and Ingols married in Boston.

Roby was an excellent scholar and was friends with some of the most learned ministers in Massachusetts. He would regularly converse with Samuel Phillips Payson, Peter Thacher, and David Osgood on theology, literature, and natural philosophy. Roby was particularly interested in astronomy.

== Death ==
In the summer of 1802,^{1} Roby was stricken with illness. He died on January 31, 1803, at the age of 78. He was interred in the Burying Ground at Saugus Centre.

The Roby School, constructed in 1896, was named for Joseph Roby. In 1984 the school was closed and converted into the Saugus School Department's administration building.

== Notes ==
1. Horace H. Atherton gives the exact month as July in History of Saugus, Massachusetts. In the Register of the Lynn Historical Society, Rev. John C. Labaree gives the month as August.
