= Hitching =

Hitching could refer to:

- Hitching (short story), a short story by Orson Scott Card
- Hitching tie, a knot
- Ringbolt hitching, a knot
- Hitchhiking
- Hitching, a synonym for lag-related overclocking (i.e. when a digital image runs smoothly, stops and repeat again)

== See also ==
- Hitchin (disambiguation)
- Hitching post (disambiguation)
- Hitchings, a surname
