= Sweetser Brothers =

American former snuff and cigar manufacturer

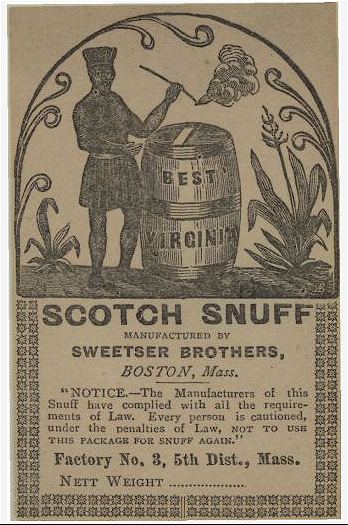
- Industry: Tobacco
- Founded: 1820
- Defunct: 1885
- Fate: Sold
- Successor: F. L. & J. A. Raddin
- Headquarters: Saugus, Massachusetts; Boston
- Key people: Charles Sweetser; George H. Sweetser; Charles A. Sweetser; Charles H. Sweetser; Albert H. Sweetser
- Products: Snuff; Cigars

Sweetser Brothers was an American manufacturer of snuff tobacco and cigars.

The Sweetser family's involvement in tobacco began with William Sweetser Jr., who sold hand-rolled snuff. His tobacco business was the first in the Saugus, Massachusetts neighborhood that bore the family name - Sweetser's Corner.

In 1820, his son Charles Sweetser purchased the snuff mill of Samuel Copp. Sweetser also manufactured cigars, specifically "long nines" and "short sixes". Sweetser's products were sold throughout the United States and Canada. Sweetser expanded his company by acquiring the snuff business owned by Jonathan Makepeace. By 1850, the business was known as Charles Sweetser & Sons. Charles Sweetser retired in 1855 and the business was taken over by two of his sons - Charles A. and George H. Sweetser, who began running it under the name Sweetser Brothers. Following George H. Sweetser's death in 1870, his son Albert H. Sweetser took over his half of the business. On October 1, 1874, Charles A. Sweetser sold his interest to his son, Charles H. Sweetser. On January 1, 1881, Albert Sweetser acquired his cousin's interest in the business. In November 1885 he sold the business to Joseph A. Raddin.
