= Holmes v. Hurst =

- Supreme Court of the United States

Argued March 8, 1899 Decided April 24, 1899
- Full case name: Holmes v. Hurst
- Citations: 174 U.S. 82 (more) 19 S. Ct. 606; 43 L. Ed. 904

Holding
- When someone begins printing a serial book in a magazine, they may file for copyright of the entire book even if the book does not exist as a completed whole. Failing that, the book is in the public domain, as expected.

Court membership
- Chief Justice Melville Fuller Associate Justices John M. Harlan · Horace Gray; David J. Brewer · Henry B. Brown; George Shiras Jr. · Edward D. White; Rufus W. Peckham · Joseph McKenna

Holmes v. Hurst, 174 U.S. 82 (1899), was a United States Supreme Court case that held that when someone begins printing a serial book in a magazine, they may file for copyright of the entire book even if the book does not exist as a completed whole. Failing that, the book is in the public domain, as expected.

Specifically, the Court found that The Autocrat of the Breakfast-Table by Oliver Wendell Holmes Sr. had entered the public domain because of its publication in Atlantic Monthly without copyright notices or an attempt to register a copyright. Its subsequent registration and publication as a whole book by Holmes could not take the individual chapters out of the public domain, so the owner of the book's copyright after Holmes's death could not prevent the publication of those chapters assembled in order as an equivalent book.

The Supreme Court later heard a similar case, Mifflin v. R. H. White Company, about the sequel to The Autocrat.
