= Patrick Byrne Magrane =

Irish-American businessman

Patrick Byrne Magrane (1852–1933) was an Irish-American businessman of the 19th and 20th centuries.

Magrane was born May 17, 1852, in Channonrock, County Louth, Ireland. He emigrated to America in 1871 (he would have been 18 or 19) and settled in Lynn, Massachusetts. He started as a merchant selling notions, hosiery, and so forth door-to-door, going on to found the P. B. Magrane store (at first with just a 15-foot front) in 1876. He was also involved in other businesses, becoming one of the wealthiest men of Lynn and an active public citizen.

Magrane married Mary Thornton, also an Irish immigrant, in 1877. The couple had eleven children, one of whom, Mary, was the wife of Governor Martin H. Glynn of New York.

== Department stores ==
The P. B. Magrane department store was one of the notable department stores of Lynn, selling shoes, draperies, books, and other items typical of department stores. Their slogan was "The Big Store – 46 Departments". The store ended its independent existence in 1954, when it was acquired by Raymond's, becoming rebranded as that company's second satellite store.

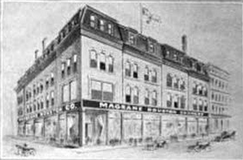
Magrane Houston store

Magrane was also president and part owner of the Magrane Houston department store in Boston, in the heart of the downtown shopping district at Washington Street and Temple Place.

The store was founded in 1842 by George Turnbull and Company. It passed to Knimouth and Company in 1854; Knimouth greatly expanded the store. Hogg, Brown, and Taylor took it over in 1858. Ownership passed to Houston and Henderson in 1892; later James A. Houston alone became the store's owner and namesake. Patrick Byrne Magrane, in partnership with P. H. Magrane (also of Lynn, and also a proprietor of the P. B. Magrane store) and P. A. O'Connell of Boston, purchased the store in 1906. O'Connell soon left, becoming the long-term president of rival E. T. Slattery in 1908.

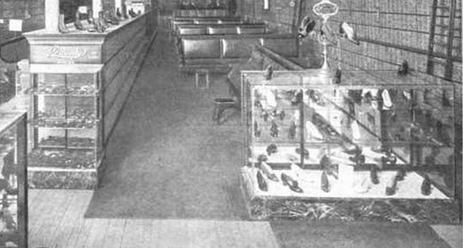
Magrane Houston shoe department, about 1913

The new owners retained the name James A. Houston for the store until 1912, when it was rebranded to Magrane Houston. In 1917, Magrane Houston announced it would continue paying the salaries of employees who enlisted in the armed forces. Magrane Houston closed in 1920.

Magrane Houston was involved in an important exclusive dealing case settled in 1922 by the United States Supreme Court, Standard Fashion Co. v. Magrane-Houston Co. Magrane Houston had a contract to carry garment patterns exclusively from Standard Fashion, but then undertook to also sell patterns from another manufacturer. Standard Fashion sued for breach of contract, Magrane Houston countering that the exclusive contract was illegal under section 3 of the Clayton Antitrust Act. The Supreme Court ruled for Magrane Houston, holding that the exclusionary practice had the effect of substantially lessening competition in the market for garment patterns.
