= R. H. White =

Coordinates: 42°21′14.7″N 71°3′43.1″W

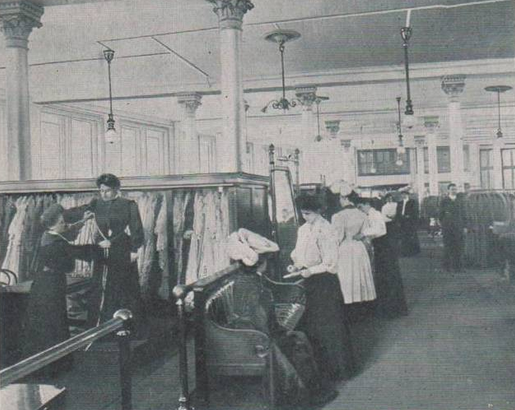
Interior, R. H. White department store

R. H. White was a department store company of the 19th and 20th centuries, based in Boston. The company existed from 1853 to c. 1980; the flagship downtown Boston store was open from 1876 to 1957.

R. H. White was founded in 1853 as a peddler by Ralph Huntington White on the railroad between Chester and Pittsfield. Originally on Winter Street in 1862, it moved in 1876 to a large ornate six-floor building (designed by Peabody and Stearns and built by McNeil Brothers) at 518–536 Washington Street, in the downtown shopping area.

In 1928 the company was bought by Filene's and in 1944 ownership passed to City Stores, Inc. Both these companies continued the independent existence of the R. H. White brand and store. In 1953 the store celebrated its centennial with a makeover and refurbishment of the flagship store, and various events. But urban decay had crept up to the lower edge of the downtown shopping area where R. H. White was located (the so-called Combat Zone would soon spring up a few blocks away). By 1956 sales were down and the store was no longer profitable; City Stores closed the flagship downtown store in 1957.

The houses of Jordan, Marsh & Company and the R. H. White Company constitute the two leading department stores of Boston.

— John Livingston Wright, The Arena, 1899

The building stood empty for a while, then – with tax incentives from the City of Boston – City Stores refurbished it and opened a new store called Citymart, which opened in August 1962. Citymart included a full grocery store and a babysitting service for shoppers. The store was not successful as the neighborhood continued to deteriorate. In 1966 the Boston Redevelopment Authority seized the building by eminent domain and moved Raymond's department store there as part of a larger urban renewal project. Raymond's ceased operation in 1972. The building was later torn down to make way for the Lafayette Place Mall urban shopping center.

The R. H. White brand continued to exist for a while, and City Stores operated R. H. White branch stores in suburban malls (such as Worcester's Lincoln Plaza shopping center and Leominster, Massachusetts' Searstown Mail). But by 1980 City Stores was bankrupt and all R. H. White outlets were closed.

== See also ==
- Mifflin v. R. H. White Company
