= Hitchin (disambiguation) =

Hitchin may refer to:

Places

- Hitchin, a town in Hertfordshire, England
- Hitchin railway station
- Hitchin (UK Parliament constituency)

People

- Derek Hitchins, a British systems engineer
- Nigel Hitchin, a British mathematician

Other

- Hitchin Town F.C., a football club
- Hitchin F.C., a defunct football club
- Hitchin functional, a mathematical concept with applications in string theory
- Hitchin system, a mathematical concept
- Hitchin Comet, a newspaper
- Hitchin' Posts, a lost 1920 drama film directed by John Ford
- Hitchin' a Ride (song):
  - By Green Day
  - By Vanity Fare

== See also ==
- Hitchens
- Hitching (disambiguation)
- Hitchings, a surname
