= George A. Sweetser =

American lawyer and horticulturist

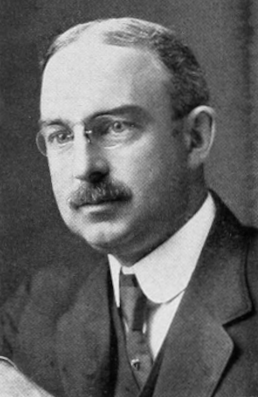
- Born: George Albert Sweetser; November 23, 1872; Saugus, Massachusetts
- Died: April 6, 1961 (aged 88); Wellesley, Massachusetts
- Education: Boston University
- Occupations: Lawyer, horticulturist
- Political party: Republican
- Spouse: Nina Rogers (m. 1895)
- Children: 1

George Albert Sweetser (November 23, 1872 – April 6, 1961) was an American lawyer and horticulturist. He was a noted corporate and trial attorney until he pleaded guilty to theft from clients. After his release from prison, Sweetser became a landscape gardener and was considered an expert on roses.

== Early life ==
Sweetser was born on November 23, 1872, in Saugus, Massachusetts' Cliftondale neighborhood to Albert H. and Annie (Jordan) Sweetser. He graduated from Malden High School in 1891 and Boston University in 1894. On October 8, 1895, he married Nina Rogers of Gloucester, Massachusetts. They had one daughter, Isabelle.

== Legal career ==
Sweetser was admitted to the bar in 1901. In 1909, he was struck with a dog whip by a woman who was suing a client of his for breach of promise. That same year he organized the firm of Anderson, Sweetser, & Wiles. Sweetser was also a director of E. T. Slattery, the Wellesley Cooperative Bank, Edward Bryant & Co., East Boston Marginal Freight Railroad, and the Concord & Boston Street Railway Company and a member of the Wellesley, Massachusetts board of selectmen from 1907 to 1911.

=== Criminal conviction and pardon ===
On April 16, 1927, Sweetser was arrested on theft charges after a client accused him for taking bonds from her safe deposit box and presenting her with worthless certificates instead of stocks and bonds. Upon his arrest, Sweetser immediately admitted to his crime, citing "financial difficulty". While awaiting arraignment, the daughter of another client accused Sweetser of withholding $2,000 of $3,000 her father was awarded in a personal injury case. In July 1927, a Suffolk County grand jury indicted Sweetser on five counts of larceny of bonds valued at $54,267. He was released on $10,000 bond. On October 26, 1927, Sweetser pleaded guilty to two counts of larceny. On January 11, 1928, Sweetser was arrested again, this time on larceny charges in Middlesex County. He was accused of misappropriating $4,500 a client gave him to invest. On April 5, 1928, he was sentenced to six to seven years in the Massachusetts State Prison. His sentence was extended by 2.5 to 5 years after he pleaded guilty to larceny in the Middlesex County case. On August 24, 1932, the Massachusetts Governor's Council granted Sweester a pardon on the condition of parole. Sweester would have been eligible for parole in May 1933 for his original sentence and the judge in that case believed that the sentences should have been served concurrently. Lieutenant Governor William S. Youngman was the only member of the council to vote against the pardon.

== Horticulture ==
Sweetser grew roses for over 60 years and was described by the Dayton Daily News as "an authority on [rose] culture and care, specializing in soils and fertilizers". He became a well-known author, lectured throughout the country, and taught classes in horticulture at Harvard College. Sweetser organized the New England Rose Society and served as its president. From 1948 to 1949 he was the president of the American Rose Society.

== Personal life and death ==
Sweetser was a Congregationalist and a member of the Republican Party. He died on April 6, 1961, at his home in Wellesley Hills.

== See also ==
- Commingling
