= Horace H. Atherton =

American politician

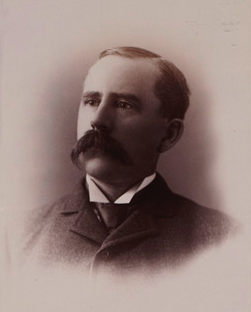

Member of the Massachusetts Senate for the Fifth Essex District
- In office 1895–1896
- Preceded by: Samuel L. Sawyer
- Succeeded by: James H. Derbyshire

Member of the Massachusetts House of Representatives for the 20th Essex District
- In office 1888–1889
- Preceded by: Charles S. Hitchings
- Succeeded by: Alonzo Penney

Personal details
- Born: October 23, 1847 Saugus, Massachusetts
- Died: July 24, 1917 (aged 69) Saugus, Massachusetts
- Resting place: Riverside Cemetery; Saugus, Massachusetts
- Party: Republican
- Spouse: Hannah Preston Oliver (1870-1913; her death)
- Occupation: Lumber merchant

Horace Hale Atherton (October 23, 1847 - July 24, 1917) was an American politician from Saugus, Massachusetts, who served in the Massachusetts House of Representatives after being elected to the 109th Massachusetts General Court in 1887. He represented the twentieth Essex district, and went on to also serve in the 110th Massachusetts General Court. He subsequently was a member of the Massachusetts Senate for two terms. He was a member of the Executive Council of 1898.

== Early life and education ==
He was the son of Artemas S. Atherton and Sarah Ann Morse. His father was a shoe manufacturer.

Atherton was educated in public schools and Lynn high school. In 1865 he became a clerk at Oliver Breed, a lumber business, which evolved into S.A. Guilford & Co, soon after becoming a junior partner at the firm.

== Career ==
His civic roles prior to being a state representative were as town auditor, and then as selectman. Atherton was elected as a Republican candidate at a state level. As an elected member of the Massachusetts House of Representatives, he was appointed to the committee on banks and banking; on prisons; and also as a special committee to represent the state at the Ohio centennial in Columbus, Ohio.

He was a Member of the Republican State Committee during 1893 and 1894; thereafter becoming elected as chairman of the committee on towns; on parishes and religious societies, and then for street railways.

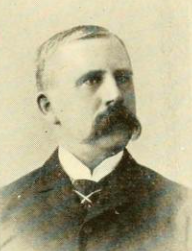
Senator Horace H. Atherton (1896)

== Other interests ==
He was a director of the Saugus Mutual Fire Insurance Company. Atherton was an author of historical articles. An avid historian of Massachusetts and New England, in 1916 he wrote the "History of Saugus, Massachusetts", which included a biographical entry on Joseph Roby. He was a member of the Massachusetts Historical Society for many years and became president of its Lynn chapter. He was a Mason and published a book on Freemasonry titled "A half century of William Sutton Lodge F. & A.M:1867-1917". As a historian in 1915, and perhaps lack of foresight, he questioned the cost of maintenance of the U.S. Route 1 turnpike, proclaiming that Saugus did not at all reap the benefit, and that it was an unnecessary expense on the town.

== Personal ==
Atherton married Hannah Preston Oliver (1851-1913) on May 15, 1870, in Lynn, Massachusetts. They had 7 children. His son Horace Jr, married Edith Hall, and followed his fathers footsteps as a local historian.

== Ancestry ==
Atherton was a New England descendant of Puritan heritage, whose ancestors had settled in Massachusetts Colony. He a direct descendant of James Atherton, one of the First Settlers of New England; who arrived in Dorchester, Massachusetts in the 1630s. His relatives include Henry B. Atherton, Thomas H. Atherton, Charles Humphrey Atherton, Cornelius Atherton, Joseph Ballard Atherton, and Uriah A. Boyden.

== See also ==
- 1888 Massachusetts legislature
- 1889 Massachusetts legislature
- 1895 Massachusetts legislature
- 1896 Massachusetts legislature
