= 1888 Massachusetts legislature =

109th Massachusetts General Court
←	108th	110th	→

Overview
- Legislative body: General Court
- Election: November 8, 1887

Senate
- Members: 40
- President: Halsey J. Boardman
- Party control: Republican

House
- Members: 240
- Speaker: Charles J. Noyes
- Party control: Republican

Sessions
- 1st: January 4, 1888 – May 29, 1888

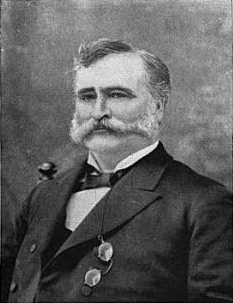
Halsey J. Boardman, Senate president.

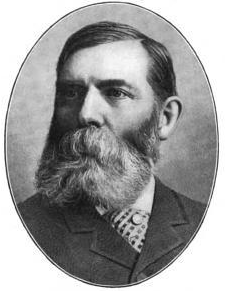
Charles Noyes, House speaker.

Leaders of the Massachusetts General Court, 1888.

The 109th Massachusetts General Court, consisting of the Massachusetts Senate and the Massachusetts House of Representatives, met in 1888 during the governorship of Oliver Ames. Halsey J. Boardman served as president of the Senate and Charles J. Noyes served as speaker of the House.

Notable legislation included incorporation of the Massachusetts chapter of the National Woman Suffrage Association.

== Senators ==
Image	Name	Date of birth	District	Party
	Halsey J. Boardman	May 19, 1834		
	Charles Nathaniel Clark	1853		
	William Alfred Clark	1852		
	John Aloysius Collins	1860		
	Benjamin Franklin Cook	January 1, 1833		
	John Crawford Crosby	June 15, 1859		
	Patrick Dennis Dwyer	1857		
	Jonathan Varnum Fletcher	1812		
	Charles Albert Gleason	1846		
	Jubal Converse Gleason	1837		
	Edward Glines	August 31, 1849		
	Harris Cowdrey Hartwell	1847		
	Edward Jacob Hathorne	1854		
	Robert Howard	February 8, 1845		
	Frank W. Howe	June 3, 1859		
	Franklyn Howland	1843		
	Edward John Jenkins	1854		
	Isaac Newton Keith	November 14, 1838		
	Ziba Cary Keith	July 13, 1842		
	David Frank Kimball	1845		
	Chester Ward Kingsley	1824		
	George Perley Ladd	1838		
	Edwin T. Marble	August 18, 1827		
	William Taylor McAlpine	1840		
	Austin Messinger	1817		
	Moses Poore Palmer	1830		
	Levi Perkins	March 13, 1831		
	James Davis Pike	1829		
	Samuel Roads, Jr.	October 22, 1853		
	John Francis Shea	1858		
	Edward J. Slattery	June 15, 1856		
	John Killbourne Clough Sleeper	1828		
	Robert Alexander Southworth	1852		
	Charles C. Spellman	December 3, 1843		
	Henry Harrison Sprague	August 1, 1841		
	James Trimble Stevens	1835		
	John Henry Sullivan	1848		
	Charles Andrew Towne	1843		
	Enos Houghton Tucker	1817		
	David Walker	1841		
	Silas Mandeville Wheelock	1818		

== Representatives ==
image	Name	Date of birth	District	Party
	Charles E. Adams	April 6, 1841	24th Middlesex	Republican
	John Jesse Allen	1844	8th Worcester	Republican
	Montressor Tyler Allen	1844	14th Middlesex	Republican
	William Oscar Armstrong	1847	9th Suffolk	Republican
	Horace H. Atherton	1847	20th Essex	Republican
	Harrison Henry Atwood	August 26, 1863	8th Suffolk	Republican
	Rollin Herbert Babbitt	1840	3rd Bristol	Republican
	John Backup	1830	21st Suffolk	Ind. Republican
	William Emerson Barrett	December 29, 1858	11th Middlesex	Republican
	Joseph Freeland Bartlett	1843	3rd Franklin	Republican
	Charles Henry Bennett	March 11, 1843	8th Hampden	Democratic
	Francis Taylor Berry	1849	13th Essex	Republican
	Charles Chauncey Bixby	1824	12th Plymouth	Republican
	Edwin Henry Blake	1838	19th Middlesex	Republican
	Andreas Blume	1837	11th Suffolk	Republican
	Francis Boardman	1826	16th Essex	Democratic
	John Bennett Bottum	July 7, 1852	1st Hampshire	Republican
	Albert Augustus Brackett	1850	4th Norfolk	Republican
	Peter Joseph Brady	October 29, 1861	23rd Middlesex	Democratic
	Arthur Butler Breed	June 30, 1857	19th Essex	Republican
	Edward Winslow Brewer	1858	23rd Suffolk	Republican
	Arthur Amber Brigham	October 6, 1856	29th Middlesex	Independent
	Asa Olin Brooks	1852	7th Hampden	
	John Freeman Brown	1848	24th Suffolk	Republican
	William Howe Burnham	1840	10th Essex	Republican
	William A. Butler	February 4, 1859	7th Essex	Republican
	Charles Amos Call	1839	8th Hampden	Republican
	Patrick Joseph Calnan	1847	5th Suffolk	Democratic
	Joseph Henry Cannell	1836	10th Middlesex	Republican
	William Henry Carey	1848	4th Berkshire	Democratic
	William Alexander Carman	1854	8th Bristol	Democratic
	Michael Carney	1820	4th Essex	Democratic
	George N. Carpenter	January 26, 1840	2nd Norfolk	Republican
	Peter Thomas Carroll	1857	18th Worcester	Ind. Democrat
	Arthur Babcock Champlin	1858	26th Suffolk	Republican
	Joseph Pike Cheney	1843	16th Worcester	Republican
	Moses Davis Church	1842	4th Middlesex	Republican
	David Harris Clark	1836	26th Middlesex	Republican
	Henry Clark	1841	9th Hampden	Republican
	Schuyler Clark	1841	2nd Hampshire	Republican
	Rowse Reynolds Clarke	February 12, 1822	10th Worcester	Republican
	George Close	1845	2nd Middlesex	Republican
	John Freeman Colby	1834	18th Suffolk	Republican
	Harvey Newton Collison	1860	6th Suffolk	Democratic
	Charles Wright Conant	1833	2nd Worcester	Republican
	James Conroy	1850	8th Bristol	Democratic
	David Conwell	1818	3rd Barnstable	Republican
	George Hunting Coolidge	1841	5th Worcester	Republican
	John William Coveney	April 10, 1845	3rd Middlesex	Democratic
	James Martin Cronin	1857	20th Worcester	Democratic
	Joshua Crowell	1841	1st Barnstable	Republican
	Samuel Cutler	1825	5th Middlesex	Republican
	Albert Levi Dame	1841	3rd Essex	Democratic
	Luther Dame	March 3, 1826	8th Essex	Republican
	Edmund Augustus Davis	1839	10th Bristol	Republican
	John Watton Delano	1852	7th Plymouth	Democratic
	George Dennis	1825	10th Essex	Republican
	Jeremiah Desmond	May 2, 1853	16th Suffolk	Democratic
	Wilson Dewey	1815	3rd Hampshire	Republican
	Solomon King Dexter	1839	24th Middlesex	Republican
	John Doherty	1844	7th Suffolk	Democratic
	Bernard Dolan	1838	7th Norfolk	Democratic
	Edward James Donovan	1864	8th Suffolk	Democratic
	James Donovan	May 28, 1859	16th Suffolk	Democratic
	Theodore Parker Dresser	1854	8th Middlesex	Republican
	John Driscoll	1853	20th Essex	Democratic
	James Joseph Dunlea	1857	22nd Suffolk	Democratic
	Harry Millett Eames	July 9, 1855	5th Essex	Republican
	Albert Redolphus Eldredge	September 10, 1850	1st Barnstable	Republican
	Frank Aldrich Fales	October 13, 1848	1st Norfolk	Republican
	Thomas George Farren	1858	7th Suffolk	Democratic
	William F. Ferry	July 4, 1854	6th Hampden	Republican
	Elkanah Finney	October 31, 1849	1st Plymouth	Democratic
	Albert Laban Fisher	1846		
	Edward Perry Fisk	1852	10th Suffolk	Republican
	David Floyd	October 26, 1854	27th Suffolk	Republican
	Edward James Flynn	1859	6th Suffolk	Democratic
	Thomas Joseph Flynn	1849	21st Middlesex	Democratic
	Jacob Fottler	1839	10th Suffolk	Republican
	Henry Friend	1841	11th Essex	Republican
	Henry Frost	1832	18th Suffolk	Republican
	Edward Gagan	1849	5th Suffolk	Democratic
	Michael Garity	1848	15th Suffolk	Democratic
	George Washington Gibson	1851	5th Hampden	Democratic
	William Augustus Gile	1843	23rd Worcester	Republican
	Joseph Henry Gleason	1848	4th Suffolk	Republican
	Willard Franklin Gleason	December 24, 1846	6th Norfolk	Republican
	William Gordon	1825	6th Bristol	Republican
	Charles Goss	1841	1st Essex	Republican
	Samuel Levis Gracey	1835	14th Essex	Republican
	Davis Packard Gray	1827		
	Morrill Asa Greenwood	1839	14th Worcester	Republican
	Freeman Clark Griswold	December 15, 1858	1st Franklin	Democratic
	Charles Francis Grosvenor	1850	10th Hampden	Republican
	Daniel Gunn	1850	23rd Suffolk	Republican
	David Joseph Hagerty	1857	14th Suffolk	Democratic
	Charles Haggerty	December 6, 1854	7th Worcester	Democratic
	Frederick Stanley Hall	1861	3rd Bristol	Republican
	Benjamin Hall Hartwell	1845	32nd Middlesex	Republican
	Henry Clark Haskell	1837	4th Franklin	Ind. Democrat
	William Harrison Hastings	1840	28th Middlesex	Democratic
	Franklin Winslow Hatch	1836	2nd Plymouth	Republican
	James Ambrose Hathaway	1837	25th Suffolk	Republican
	Elihu Burritt Hayes	1848	18th Essex	Republican
	John Edward Hayes	1845	3rd Suffolk	Democratic
	Henry Dunton Haynes	1837	5th Worcester	Republican
	Robert Henry	1833	9th Bristol	Republican
	Luther Hill	1825	6th Worcester	Republican
	William John Hinchcliffe	1855	5th Essex	Republican
	Calvin Hitchcock	1817	5th Hampshire	Republican
	William Southerland Hixon	1848	26th Suffolk	Republican
	John Adams Holbrook	1837	5th Norfolk	Democratic
	Frank Edward Holman	1853	13th Worcester	Republican
	George Mitchell Hooper	September 1, 1838	9th Plymouth	Republican
	George Harford Hunt	1843	5th Plymouth	Republican
	Alden Potter Jaques	March 4, 1835	2nd Essex	Republican
	Jeremiah Joseph Keane	1855	4th Hampden	Democratic
	George Henry Kearn	1839	1st Berkshire	Democratic
	Horace Manley Kendall	1848	15th Worcester	Republican
	Patrick Joseph Kennedy	January 14, 1858	2nd Suffolk	Democratic
	Henry Albert Kimball	May 3, 1842	1st Hampshire	Democratic
	John White Kimball	February 27, 1828	15th Worcester	Republican
	Charles Henry Knox	1847	1st Hampden	Democratic
	James Lally Jr.	1862	11th Worcester	Democratic
	William Tuck Leach	1838	24th Suffolk	Republican
	Edward Joseph Leary	May 27, 1860	13th Suffolk	Democratic
	John Q. A. Lothrop	October 14, 1824	4th Plymouth	Republican
	Clarence Parker Lovell	1848	1st Suffolk	Republican
	Payson Williston Lyman	1842	4th Hampshire	Republican
	Henry Stephen Lyons	November 21, 1865	1st Berkshire	Democratic
	Albert Sylvester Manning	1846	6th Essex	Republican
	David Manning	August 29, 1846	22nd Worcester	Republican
	James Pope Martin	1827	18th Essex	Republican
	Samuel Walker McCall	February 28, 1851	15th Middlesex	Republican
	Patrick McCarthy	1849	10th Plymouth	Democratic
	Thomas McCooey	1851	11th Worcester	Democratic
	Robert Henry McDonald	1854	6th Berkshire	Democratic
	John H. McDonough	March 29, 1857	20th Suffolk	
	Thomas Owen McEnaney	October 23, 1857	2nd Suffolk	Democratic
	Michael Joseph McEttrick	June 22, 1848	20th Suffolk	Democratic
	James Henry Mellen	1845	19th Worcester	Democratic
	John Flint Merrill	January 16, 1849	5th Norfolk	Republican
	Albert E. Miller	1834	9th Norfolk	Republican
	Lyman Munson Miller	1836	27th Suffolk	Republican
	Daniel Lake Milliken	1837	9th Middlesex	Republican
	John Cruikshank Milne	1824	9th Bristol	Republican
	William Henry Monahan	1857	19th Suffolk	Democratic
	George Francis Morey	1826	24th Middlesex	Republican
	John Milton Morin	February 14, 1828	2nd Berkshire	Democratic
	Harrison Emmons Morton	1842	13th Worcester	Republican
	Sidney Tucker Nelson	1845	8th Plymouth	Republican
	Thomas Lorenzo Noonan	1835	19th Suffolk	Democratic
	Caleb Jerome Norwood	1838	9th Essex	Democratic
	Charles Johnson Noyes	August 7, 1841	14th Suffolk	
	Dennis Joseph O'Brien	1845	27th Middlesex	Democratic
	John William O'Mealey	1861	17th Suffolk	Democratic
	John William O'Neil	1859	3rd Suffolk	Democratic
	Thomas F. O'Neill	November 5, 1859	29th Middlesex	Democratic
	Henry Parkman	May 23, 1850	9th Suffolk	Republican
	Isaac Smith Pear	1830	4th Middlesex	Republican
	Henry Mulford Peirson	1825	4th Berkshire	Republican
	Nathaniel R. Perkins	September 10, 1847	2nd Worcester	Republican
	George Robbins Perry	1836	1st Bristol	Republican
	Charles Quincy Pierce	1841	16th Middlesex	Republican
	Alfred Stamm Pinkerton	March 19, 1856	17th Worcester	Republican
	John Wallace Plaisted	1828	21st Worcester	Republican
	William Hall Poore	1864	3rd Essex	Republican
	Harvey Hunter Pratt	1860	6th Plymouth	Democratic
	William Henry Preble	1856	4th Suffolk	Republican
	William Provin	February 14, 1842	2nd Hampden	Democratic
	Francis Winnie Qua	1845	22nd Middlesex	Republican
	Josiah Quincy	October 15, 1859	5th Norfolk	Ind. Democrat
	Andrew Quinn	1853	12th Suffolk	Ind. Democrat
	Dennis Joseph Quinn	1861	12th Suffolk	Democratic
	Philip Henry Quinn	1859		
	Francis Henry Raymond	February 19, 1836	6th Middlesex	Republican
	Samuel Miner Raymond	June 30, 1842	3rd Berkshire	Democratic
	John Read	May 19, 1840	1st Middlesex	Republican
	James Henry Richards	1839	16th Essex	Republican
	Henry Riddell	1848	Nantucket	Independent
	John C. Risteen	1841	1st Essex	Independent
	Ethan Chapin Robinson	1839	6th Hampden	Democratic
	Jonathan Henry Robinson	February 9, 1831	12th Worcester	Republican
	Joseph Wheelden Rogers	1823	2nd Barnstable	Republican/Prohibitionist
	Samuel Nomlas Rogers	1840	9th Worcester	Republican
	William Blanding Rogerson	1846	2nd Bristol	Republican
	Arthur Gilbert Rounsevell	1851	4th Bristol	Republican
	Charles Parks Rugg	1827	6th Bristol	Republican
	Alvin Dudley Russell	1849	30th Middlesex	Republican
	Irving Levi Russell	1852	7th Middlesex	Republican
	Alpheus Sanford	July 5, 1856	17th Suffolk	Republican
	Chester Franklin Sanger	1858	1st Middlesex	Republican
	Charles Warren Seavey	1839	8th Norfolk	Republican
	Edward Payson Shaw	September 1, 1841	7th Essex	Republican
	Charles Fay Shepard	1827	2nd Hampden	Republican
	Samuel Dwight Simonds	1846	4th Worcester	Republican
	George Wing Slocum	1818	7th Bristol	Republican
	Winfield Scott Slocum	1848	17th Middlesex	Republican
	Sidney Pond Smith	1850	1st	
	William Davies Sohier	1858	12th Essex	Ind. Republican
	Benjamin Franklin Southwick	July 5, 1835	21st Essex	Republican
	Charles Edward Spring	1841	28th Middlesex	Republican
	Daniel Philmore Stimpson	1818	17th Essex	Republican
	Cyrus Story	1822	10th Essex	Republican
	Elijah Baron Stowe	1844	8th Norfolk	Republican
	Michael Francis Sullivan	September 22, 1858	6th Essex	Democratic
	Thomas Francis Sullivan	1862	13th Suffolk	Democratic
	Charles Henry Symonds	1857	15th Essex	Republican
	Robert Lovett Taft	1841	7th Berkshire	Republican
	Albert Hobbs Temple	1832	5th Franklin	Republican
	Rufus Albert Thayer	1839	7th Norfolk	Republican
	Albert Cranston Thompson	1843	11th Plymouth	Republican
	Albert Gardner Thompson	1853	25th Middlesex	Republican
	Isaac Brownell Tompkins	August 17, 1826	5th Bristol	Republican
	Joseph Leland Towne	1861	19th Essex	Democratic
	George Washington Trull	1849	20th Middlesex	Republican
	Henry Abiel Turner	1827	3rd Plymouth	Republican
	Ansel Peabody Tyler	1839	22nd Essex	Republican
	Samuel Otis Upham	1824	18th Middlesex	Republican
	Edwin D. Vanderhoop	1848	Dukes	Republican
	Horace G. Wadlin	October 2, 1851	14th Middlesex	Republican
	Abijah Tyler Wales	1833	1st Bristol	Republican
	Arthur Clarence Walworth	1844	17th Middlesex	Republican
	Erskine Warden	1839	18th Middlesex	Republican
	Jacob Otis Wardwell	March 14, 1857	2nd Essex	Republican
	Moses Everett Ware	1831	21st Suffolk	Republican
	Franklin Levi Waters	1829	2nd Franklin	Republican
	William Fisher Wharton	1847	11th Suffolk	Republican
	James Edgar Whitcher	1847	12th Middlesex	Republican
	William Leonard White	1843	3rd Bristol	Republican
	William Allan Wilde	1837	9th Middlesex	Republican
	Albert Llewellyn Wiley	1835	3rd Worcester	Republican
	John Williamson Wilkinson	1832	2nd Middlesex	Republican
	Rufus Henry Willis	1838	5th Bristol	Republican
	Reuben Winchester	1825	3rd Hampden	Democratic
	John Winthrop	1841	5th Berkshire	Democratic
	Charles Thomas Witt	July 18, 1848	1st Suffolk	Republican
	Frank Forrest Woods		15th Suffolk	Republican
	Charles Francis Woodward	November 19, 1852	13th Middlesex	Republican
	Arthur Wright	1837	31st Middlesex	Republican
	Ferdinand Adolphus Wyman	1850	3rd Norfolk	

== See also ==
- Massachusetts Ballot Act
- 50th United States Congress
- List of Massachusetts General Courts
