= Mifflin v. Dutton =

- Supreme Court of the United States

Argued April 30 – May 1, 1903 Decided June 1, 1903
- Full case name: Mifflin v. Dutton
- Citations: 190 U.S. 265 (more) 23 S. Ct. 771; 47 L. Ed. 1043

Holding
- The authorized appearance of a work in a magazine without a copyright notice specifically dedicated to that work transfers that work into the public domain.

Court membership
- Chief Justice Melville Fuller Associate Justices John M. Harlan · David J. Brewer; Henry B. Brown · Edward D. White; Rufus W. Peckham · Joseph McKenna; Oliver W. Holmes Jr. · William R. Day

Case opinion
- Majority: Brown, joined by unanimous

Mifflin v. Dutton, 190 U.S. 265 (1903), was a United States Supreme Court case in which the Court held that the authorized appearance of a work in a magazine without a copyright notice specifically dedicated to that work transfers that work into the public domain.

== Background ==
The case concerned the publication of The Minister's Wooing by Harriet Beecher Stowe, published chapter-by-chapter in Atlantic Monthly before and after a copyright filing, and never with the required notice in the magazine. Following the serialization, Houghton, Mifflin & Co. published a single volume with proper copyright on behalf of Stowe and, later her estate. E. P. Dutton published the same book claiming it was in the public domain and the court agreed.

This case shared its reasoning with the previous case Mifflin v. R. H. White Company.
