= John B. Hitchings =

American shoe manufacturer and politician

Member of the Massachusetts House of Representatives for Saugus
- In office 1853–1853
- Preceded by: George H. Sweetser
- Succeeded by: Samuel Hawkes

Personal details
- Born: March 6, 1815 Saugus, Massachusetts
- Died: November 17, 1887 (aged 72) Saugus, Massachusetts
- Resting place: Riverside Cemetery; Saugus, Massachusetts
- Party: Democratic
- Spouse: Zeruiah J. Sweetser (1840-1878; her death)
- Relations: Benjamin Hitchings Jr. (brother); Otis M. Hitchings (brother); Charles S. Hitchings (son)
- Occupation: Shoe manufacturer

John Ballard Hitchings (March 6, 1815 – November 17, 1887) was an American shoe manufacturer and politician.

Hitchings was born on March 6, 1815, to Benjamin and Jane Hitchings. His father was a shoemaker and Hitchings and his brother Otis eventually joined their father as partners. On May 17, 1840, Hitchings married Zeruiah J. Sweetser, daughter of Charles and Nancy Mansfield Sweetser. Hitchings held various offices in the town of Saugus, Massachusetts and was a member of the Massachusetts House of Representatives in 1853.
