= Morris v. United States =

- Supreme Court of the United States

Argued October 26–28, and 31; November 1–4, and 7, 1898 Decided May 1, 1899
- Full case name: Morris et al. v. United States
- Citations: 174 U.S. 196 (more) 19 S. Ct. 649; 43 L. Ed. 946; 1899 U.S. LEXIS 1495

Case history
- Prior: On appeal from the Supreme Court of the District of Columbia

Court membership
- Chief Justice Melville Fuller Associate Justices John M. Harlan · Horace Gray; David J. Brewer · Henry B. Brown; George Shiras Jr. · Edward D. White; Rufus W. Peckham · Joseph McKenna

Case opinions
- Majority: Shiras, joined by Fuller, Harlan, Brewer, Brown
- Dissent: White, joined by Peckham
- Gray and McKenna took no part in the consideration or decision of the case.

Morris v. United States, 174 U.S. 196 (1899), is a 5-to-2 ruling by the United States Supreme Court which held that the bed under the Potomac River between the District of Columbia and the Commonwealth of Virginia belonged to the United States government rather than nearby private landowners on the District of Columbia side.

== Background ==
On June 20, 1632, Charles I, King of England, made a land grant in North America to Cecil Calvert, 2nd Baron Baltimore which became the Province of Maryland (later the state of Maryland). This grant set the boundary of Maryland at the low-water mark of the southern bank of the Potomac River. On September 27, 1688, King James II made a land grant in North American to Thomas Colepeper, 2nd Baron Colepeper which became the Colony of Virginia (later the state of Virginia). This grant designated "the Potomac River" as the boundary of Virginia. The conflicting grants led to a long-running border dispute between Maryland and Virginia. The two states settled navigational and riparian water rights in the Maryland–Virginia Compact of 1785, but the boundary dispute continued.

In 1788, the United States Constitution was ratified. The Constitution established an independent zone known as the District of Columbia for the seat of the new government. The Residence Act of 1790 provided for the new capital to be located on the Potomac River, and President George Washington was authorized by the United States Congress to determine the exact location (which he did a year later). The District of Columbia Organic Act of 1801 formally established Congressional jurisdiction over the new District. The Virginia retrocession of 1846-1847 returned that portion of the District of Columbia on the Virginia site of the Potomac River to the state of Virginia. This left in doubt the exact position of the District's border with Virginia (just as Maryland's southern border remained in doubt).

Chief Justice John Marshall, whose heirs were party to the suit

Shortly after the creation of the District of Columbia, the United States government sold certain plots of land to James M. Marshall; his brother, John Marshall (later Chief Justice of the United States); John L. Kidwell; the Chesapeake and Ohio Canal Company; and several others.

Maryland and Virginia agreed to arbitrate their dispute, and in 1877 the Black–Jenkins Award (as the decision of the arbitration panel is known) placed Virginia's boundary with Maryland at the low-water mark on the Virginia side of the Potomac River.

In 1882, Congress passed legislation providing for the dredging of the Potomac River, and for the dredged material to be used to fill in various tidal basins, marshes, and shores. This created extensive new land along the northern shore of the Potomac River—land which adjoined that of the heirs of James Marshall, John Marshall, and John Kidwell, and the Chesapeake and Ohio Canal Company. Congress passed legislation in August 1886 directing the Attorney General of the United States to protect the interests of the United States to the new land, and giving the courts jurisdiction over these claims.

The heirs and other claimants sued to win title to the lands.

== Decision ==
=== Majority opinion ===
Associate Justice George Shiras Jr. wrote the majority opinion for the Court, joined by Chief Justice Melville Fuller and Justices John Marshall Harlan, David Josiah Brewer, and Henry Billings Brown.

Justice Shiras first laid out the facts of the case in a lengthy syllabus, and established various classes of claimants. The first issue Justice Shiras confronted was whether any of the parties could lay claim to the bed of the Potomac River (and thus the reclaimed lands built by the government). Shiras held that none of the heirs on the Virginia side of the river could make any claim to the riverbed. Neither Lord Colepeper, his heir Thomas Fairfax, 6th Lord Fairfax of Cameron, nor any of Fairfax's heirs had ever seriously asserted title to the riverbed, and the Black–Jenkins Award clearly re-established that the boundary of Virginia ended at the low-water mark and did not extend to the riverbed. Relying on the Supreme Court's previous decision in Martin v. Waddell, 41 U.S. 367 (1842), Justice Shiras argued that none of the Maryland landholders could claim title to the riverbed, either. The majority held the original landholders were to hold the river and its bed in trust for the public, and that after the American Revolution these public trusts passed into the possession of the state (in this case, Maryland and in due time the District of Columbia). Shiras distinguished Fairfax's Devisee v. Hunter's Lessee, 11 U.S. 603 (1813) by noting that Fairfax's Devisee did not involve Maryland or any Marylander claimant. Even if the riverbed had been assigned to Lord Fairfax and his heirs, Shiras concluded, the logic of Martin v. Waddell still held and delivered the lands into the control of the federal government.

The majority dismissed the Kidwell heirs' claim to the newly created land under the same reasoning applied to the Marshall heirs. However, Kidwell's heirs noted that Congress had conveyed the property to Kidwell under a resolution adopted on February 16, 1839. The majority held, however, that Congress did not intend by that resolution to convey the riverbed. The majority relied heavily on the discussion in Illinois Central Railroad v. Illinois, 146 U.S. 387 (1892), Shively v. Bowlby, 152 U.S. 1 (1894), and Mann v. Tacoma Land Company, 153 U.S. 273 (1894), and from the express language of the resolution (which withheld from the grant any lands for public purposes). Shiras produced a highly detailed history of the establishment of the boundaries of the District of Columbia, the plots within its boundaries, and how these plots were conveyed to the private landowners. He concluded that none of the survey reports conveyed an interest in any riverbed. Shiras also noted that in Potomac Steam-Boat Co. v. Upper Potomac Steam-Boat Co., 109 U.S. 672 (1884), the Supreme Court had held that public streets were not part of any plot, and that Water Street (which bounded the Kidwell land to the south) distinctly separated the private land not only from the street itself but also from the newly created lands beyond it.

As for the canal company's claims, the majority held that since none of the private landowners held riparian rights, the company could not obtain such rights from the private landowners. Nor was there any evidence that Congress was relinquishing its rights to Water Street or the river. The court dismissed the claims of the last landowners, whose property lay between Water Street and the shore, as being improperly based on unofficial land records and for being based on maps and other documents which did not accurately reflect the physical land.

The judgment was affirmed.

=== Dissent ===
Justice Edward Douglass White, joined by Justice Rufus Wheeler Peckham, dissented.

Justice White concluded that nothing in the record showed that the United States intended to withdraw the riparian water rights of the landholders when it built Water Street and cut the landholders off from the Potomac River. White also engaged in a lengthy discussion of the laying out of the city's boundaries, and the conveyance of private property to the federal government. There could be no doubt, White argued, that the private landowners intended to give all of their riparian rights to the federal government, and there could be no doubt that the federal government intended to give all riparian rights to those to whom it sold the land. The majority's argument led to a tautology in which no riparian rights existed.

Justice White also examined the conveyance of the federal government's land to the new private landowners in depth as well. In his discussion, White interpreted the "incorrect" maps as indicating the riparian rights to which the new private landowners were entitled (rather than a problem of inaccurate mapping). White concluded several times that the federal government fully intended to convey riparian rights to the new landowners because the government and its agents repeatedly indicated in letters, memoranda, contracts of sale, and other documents and statements its expectation that the waterside landowners were to build and maintain docks, wharves, and quays and improve the riparian rights they enjoyed. To assume otherwise, White concluded, was nonsensical. Either the federal government intended to convey riparian rights, or the government deceptively contemplated building Water Street and cutting the new landowners off from their access. "...the first hypothesis is the one naturally to be assumed." "The contracts for the sale of water lots with riparian rights attached, the reports of the surveyors, and the action of the commissioners, all blend into a harmonious and perfect whole, working from an original conception to a successful consummation of a well-understood result. The contrary view produces discord and disarrangement..."

White also discussed the District of Columbia's lengthy history regarding the regulation of wharves and docks. In his view, the city's treatment of the wharves demonstrated that the wharves were private property on private riverbed land, not private property licensed to be emplaced on a riverbed held in the public trust. White interpreted Potomac Steam-Boat Co. as superimposing an easement on top of existing riparian water rights. It was not, as the majority held, the government's purpose all along to bound the plots of land with Water Street.

Justice White would have overturned the judgment of the lesser court for determination of the riparian rights of the landowners in question.

== Assessment ==
In Morris v. United States, the Supreme Court dealt with what was known as a "top common," a tract of land between a river and the land intended to be occupied and sold to private landowners. Such practices were common in colonial America. Morris v. United States is considered an important case in the evolution of the law of rivers, streams, lakes, and other bodies of water, for it established that such bodies of water and their beds belonged to the public in common and were held in trust by the state for its citizens. The Supreme Court further developed this public trust doctrine in Illinois Central Railroad v. Illinois in 1892 and more recently in Utah Division of State Lands v. United States, 482 U.S. 193, 203 (1987).

== See also ==
- List of United States Supreme Court cases, volume 174
- Maryland v. West Virginia
