= Adam Hawkes =

- Born: 25/26 January 1605; Hingham, Norfolk, England
- Died: 13 March 1672; Saugus, Massachusetts

Adam Hawkes (25 or 26 January 1605 – 13 March 1672) was an English immigrant who was the original settler of what is now known as Saugus, Massachusetts, United States. He was the great-great-great grandfather of second President of the United States John Adams.

== Biography ==
Hawkes was born on 25 or 26 January 1605, to John Hawke and an unknown mother, in Hingham, Norfolk, England. He was then baptized 26 January 1605, at St. Andrews Church, Higham, Norfolk. Hawkes immigrated from England with the Winthrop Fleet, led by John Winthrop, in 1630. On arrival in America Hawkes first settled in Charlestown in the Massachusetts Bay Colony. In Charlestown he worked as a husbandman, holding the offices of Cow Commissioner and Surveyor. After getting married and selling his property in Charlestown in 1635, Hawkes then moved to the wilderness in Lynn (now known as Saugus) to cultivate the land and start farming. The Hawkes family were the first known settlers of this area. The first log cabin that Hawkes built came to be known as "Close Hill".

Hawkes died on 13 March 1672, in Saugus.

== Marriages ==
In 1631 Hawkes married Ann Hutchinson (née Brown), widow of Thomas Hutchinson. Her parents were Edward Brown and Jane Brown (née Lide). She was born circa 1615 in Inkberrow, Worcestershire, England, and died in Lynn, Essex County, Massachusetts on 4 December 1669. (prior to 1752 the year started with March as the first month of the calendar. The tenth month is December) With the death of his first wife, Hawkes then married Sarah Hooper, daughter of William and Elizabeth Hooper. Their marriage was on 2 June 1670, making Hawkes 65 years old. Sarah was born on 7 December 1650, in Reading (now Wakefield), Middlesex County, Massachusetts.

== Children ==
With wife Ann:

- John Hawkes, b. February 1630/31, Charlestown, Suffolk Co., MA, d. before 1633
- John Hawkes, b. 13 August 1633, Charlestown, Suffolk, MA, d. 5 August 1694, Lynn, MA
- Susannah Hawkes, b. 13 August 1633, d. before 1696

Possibly with Ann, possibly stepchildren:

- Adam Hawkes, d. date unknown
- Moses Hawkes, d. date unknown
- Benjamin Hawkes, d. date unknown
- Thomas Hawkes, d. date unknown

With wife Sarah:

- Sarah Hawkes, b. 1 June 1671, Lynn, MA, d. 23 December 1716, Andover, MA

== Legacy ==
In 1876 Reverend Winfield Scott Hawkes formed the Adam Hawkes Family Association. Their first reunion was held in 1880, in North Saugus, Massachusetts, at the Lewis Penn Hawkes Homestead. Over 400 people were in attendance. Dr. John Milton Hawks, the first president of the Adam Hawkes Family Association, spent many years compiling the Hawkes ancestry. These genealogical records remain to this day in the New England Historic Genealogy Society in Boston. In 1957 Bradley H Patterson published Adam Hawkes, 1608-1672: His life and times. Adam Hawkes of Saugus, Mass., 1605-1672, The First Six Generations in America was published 1980 from author Ethel Farrington Smith and the Adam Hawkes Family Association. John Hawks, a founder of Hadley, Massachusetts: after a sojourn of twenty-four years at Windsor, Connecticut : thirteen generations in America, by Imogene Hawks Lane, was published in 1989. Massachusetts politician Samuel Hawkes is descended from Adam Hawkes. Second President of the United States John Adams is Hawkes' great-great-great grandson.
