= Otis M. Hitchings =

American shoe manufacturer and politician

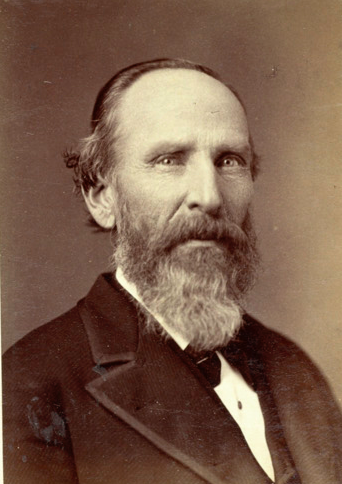

Member of the Massachusetts House of Representatives for the 20th Essex District
- In office 1876–1876
- Preceded by: John H. Potter
- Succeeded by: Timothy Dacey / John C. Sanborn

Personal details
- Born: August 8, 1822 Saugus, Massachusetts
- Died: 1894 (aged 71 or 72) Saugus, Massachusetts
- Resting place: Riverside Cemetery; Saugus, Massachusetts
- Party: Democratic
- Relations: Benjamin Hitchings Jr. (brother); John B. Hitchings (brother); Charles S. Hitchings (nephew)
- Occupation: Shoe manufacturer

Otis Munroe Hitchings (August 8, 1822 – 1894) was an American shoe manufacturer and politician who served one term in the Massachusetts House of Representatives.

Hitchings was born on August 8, 1822, in Saugus, Massachusetts. His father, Benjamin Hitchings, was a shoe manufacturer and Otis and his brother John B. eventually joined their father as partners. From 1846 to 1872, Hitchings ran his own company, which employed as many as 100 employees. In 1876 he represented the 20th Essex District in the Massachusetts House of Representatives.
