= Raymond's =

Raymond's was an American department store company of the 19th and 20th centuries, extant from the 1870s to 1972 and located in Eastern Massachusetts. The main store was at Washington Street and Franklin Street in downtown Boston.

== History ==
Shortly after the Great Boston Fire of 1872, which destroyed much of the downtown shopping district, George J. Raymond (1852–1915) pitched a tent downtown and sold an assortment of hats he bought at a fire sale. His store then later became a permanent fixture on Washington Street.

Raymond's was more downscale and freewheeling than nearby competitors such as Filene's and Jordan Marsh. A typical sale (supported by advertising and covered by the local newspapers) would find the contents of an entire distressed or overstocked out-of-town clothing store bought up and dumped in random piles on tables and counters. But Raymond's did carry many good-quality items, often at good prices.

Raymond's mascot was rustic bearded swamp Yankee Unkle Eph, who mangled English spelling; the store's slogan was "Where U Bot The Hat". Typical advertising copy was "Moar! Jess Arrived!... Nother big shipment ov the overstock frum a Midwestern Dept. stoar..." An annual sales stunt in the early 20th century was "originashun day" (the anniversary of the founding of the store), featuring the arrival of Uncle Eph from South Station in a hay wagon drawn by oxen, along with his hillbilly band and various rural vaudeville characters. Unkle Eph (pronounced "Eef" and short for Ephraim) was based on a real person, Congregational minister Harvey B. Eastman of Slatersville, Rhode Island.

There were, at times, also satellite Raymond's stores in Arlington, Dedham, Lynn, Malden, Quincy, Methuen, and Waltham. The first branch, in Quincy, opened around 1952. The second branch was created in 1954 by taking over the P. B. Magrane department store of Lynn. The Lynn store moved from the P. B. Magrane building to a new anchor store in a shopping plaza on State Street, then to a store on the Lynnway.

=== Decline and closure ===
Beginning in the 1950s, the Boston Redevelopment Authority embarked on an aggressive program of urban renewal. In 1966, the city forced Raymond's out of its aging and somewhat ramshackle complex of attached buildings at Washington and Franklin Streets, which forced a move down Washington Street toward a less desirable location, the old R. H. White building near the so-called Combat Zone. The move was intended to be temporary, and Raymond's was to return to a new, modern building at its old site. But sales fell badly at the new site, and Raymond's lacked the capital to complete the project. Woolworth's stepped in and completed and occupied the building, and had the back office operations of National Shawmut Bank take space on upper floors. Raymond's held on in its new location until 1972, when it went out of business.
