= Benjamin Hitchings Jr. =

American shoe manufacturer and politician

Member of the Massachusetts House of Representatives for Saugus
- In office 1841–1841
- Preceded by: Francis Dizer
- Succeeded by: Stephen E. Hawkes

Personal details
- Born: January 12, 1813 Lynn, Massachusetts
- Died: January 13, 1893 (aged 80) Saugus, Massachusetts
- Resting place: Riverside Cemetery; Saugus, Massachusetts
- Spouse: Esther C. Carlton (1840-1893; his death)
- Relations: John B. Hitchings (brother); Otis M. Hitchings (brother); Charles S. Hitchings (nephew)
- Occupation: Shoe manufacturer

Benjamin Hitchings Jr. (January 12, 1813 – January 13, 1893) was an American shoe manufacturer and politician who served one term in the Massachusetts House of Representatives.

Hitchings was born on January 12, 1813, in Lynn, Massachusetts to Benjamin and Jane Hitchings. The Hitchings family soon moved to Saugus, Massachusetts, where Benjamin Hitchings Sr. started a shoe manufacturing business. On September 6, 1840, Hitchings married Esther C. Carlton. They had two daughters. In 1841, Hitchings represented Saugus in the Massachusetts House of Representatives. Hitchings died on January 13, 1893.
