= Charles Sweetser (manufacturer) =

American tobacco manufacturer and politician

Member of the Massachusetts House of Representatives from Saugus
- In office 1851–1851
- Preceded by: Sewall Bordman
- Succeeded by: George H. Sweetser
- In office 1839–1839
- Preceded by: William W. Boardman
- Succeeded by: Francis Dizer

Personal details
- Born: May 12, 1793 Saugus, Massachusetts
- Died: July 24, 1865 (aged 72) Saugus, Massachusetts
- Spouse(s): Nancy Mansfield (1815–1835; her death); Sally S. Bond (1836–1865; his death)
- Relations: George H. Sweetser (son); Albert H. Sweetser (grandson); Charles S. Hitchings (grandson)
- Occupation: Tobacco manufacturer

Charles Sweetser (May 12, 1793 – July 24, 1865) was an American tobacco manufacturer and politician.

== Personal life ==
Sweetser was the son of William Sweetser Jr., a snuff manufacturer who established the first tobacco business in the Saugus neighborhood that bore the family name - Sweetser's Corner (now known as Cliftondale). On August 6, 1815, he married Nancy Mansfield. They had five sons and five daughters. Nancy Sweetser died on October 3, 1835, at the age of 36. On March 14, 1836, he married Sally S. Bond of Lynn, Massachusetts.

== Business career ==
In 1820, Sweetser purchased the snuff mill of Samuel Copp. Sweetser manufactured cigars as well as snuff. His products were sold across the United States and even internationally. In 1844 he purchased a chocolate mill from Amariah Childs and used it to roast and grind coffee. The mill was later taken over by Herbert B. Newhall, son of Benjamin F. Newhall. Sweetser retired in 1860 and his tobacco business was taken over by his two of his sons, Charles A. and George H. Sweetser, who ran it as Sweetser Brothers.

== Politics ==
In 1839, Sweetser was elected to the Massachusetts House of Representatives. He was elected to a second term in 1851. He was described by E. P. Robinson as someone who was "very decided in his opinions" and who "enjoyed the confidence of the people to a large degree". He was succeeded by his son George at the end of his second term.
