= The Autocrat of the Breakfast-Table =

1858 book by Oliver Wendell Holmes

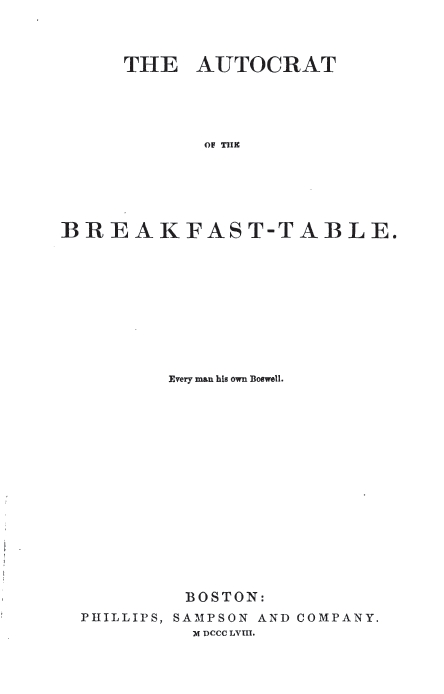
- Author: Oliver Wendell Holmes Sr.
- Language: English
- Genre: Essays
- Publisher: Phillips, Sampson and Company
- Publication date: 1858
- Publication place: Boston, Massachusetts, United States
- Pages: 271
- OCLC: 283456

The Autocrat of the Breakfast-Table (1858) is a collection of essays written by Oliver Wendell Holmes Sr. The essays were originally published in The Atlantic Monthly in 1857 and 1858 before being collected in book form. The author had written two essays with the same name which were published in the earlier The New-England Magazine in November 1831 and February 1832, which are alluded to in a mention of an "interruption" at the start of the first essay.

== Overview ==
The essays take the form of a chiefly one-sided dialogue between the unnamed Author and the other residents of a New England boarding house who are known only by their profession, location at the table, or other defining characteristics. The topics discussed range from an essay on the unexpected benefits of old age to the finest place to site a dwelling to comments on the nature of conversation itself. The tone of the book is distinctly Yankee and takes a seriocomic approach to the subject matter.

Each essay typically ends with a poem on the theme of the essay. There are also poems ostensibly written by the fictional disputants scattered throughout.

== Publication history ==
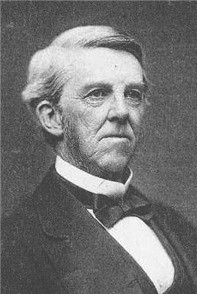
Holmes first published The Autocrat of the Breakfast-Table in book form in 1858.

In 1830, Holmes moved out of his childhood home in Cambridge, Massachusetts, and stayed in a boardinghouse in Boston while attending the city's medical college. During this time, he wrote two essays detailing life at his boardinghouse. They were published under the title The Autocrat of the Breakfast-Table in November 1831 and February 1832 in The New England Magazine. Years later, Holmes was instrumental in establishing The Atlantic Monthly in 1856, even providing the magazine's title. For its first issue, Holmes published new versions of his prior essays based on fictionalized breakfast table talk and including poetry, stories, jokes and songs. These essays were not collected in book form until 1858.

=== The Breakfast-Table series ===
In addition to Autocrat, there are two further volumes in the series drawing on later essays along similar themes. The first sequel, The Professor at the Breakfast-Table, was published in 1859. Its second sequel, The Poet at the Breakfast-Table, was published much later in 1872. The original "Autocrat" of the first series dies and is replaced by a physician who trained in Paris who is also a faculty member of a well-known medical school in the sequel. Holmes also included a character nicknamed "Little Boston", the last surviving member of a well-established Massachusetts family that was known to be a satirical version of Holmes himself. The final installment, The Poet at the Breakfast Table, focuses on a character referred to as The Master, who advocates modern scientific ideas. The fifteen-year gap between the original Breakfast-Table book and its final installment allowed a very different tone which was more mellow and nostalgic than its predecessors. Holmes wrote of it: "As people grow older ... they come at length to live so much in memory that they often think with a kind of pleasure of losing their dearest possessions. Nothing can be so perfect while we possess it as it will seem when remembered".

== Critical response ==
Holmes's essays were well received by critics and readers alike and their inclusion in The Atlantic Monthly in 1857 helped secure that magazine's early success. In book form, The Autocrat of the Breakfast-Table sold ten thousand copies in only three days. It has become Holmes's most enduring work.

Holmes's friend and fellow writer James Russell Lowell believed the protagonist's switch from "Autocrat" to "Professor" in the sequel was a good change, writing to Holmes, "I like the new Professor ... better than the old Autocrat". But Lowell warned him about some of the theological commentary in the book: "The Religious Press ... will be at you, but after smashing one of them you will be able to furnish yourself with a Sampson's [sic] weapon for the rest of the Philistines".

== Image gallery ==
Illustrations by Augustus Hoppin in 1858 edition (Phillips, Sampson Co.)

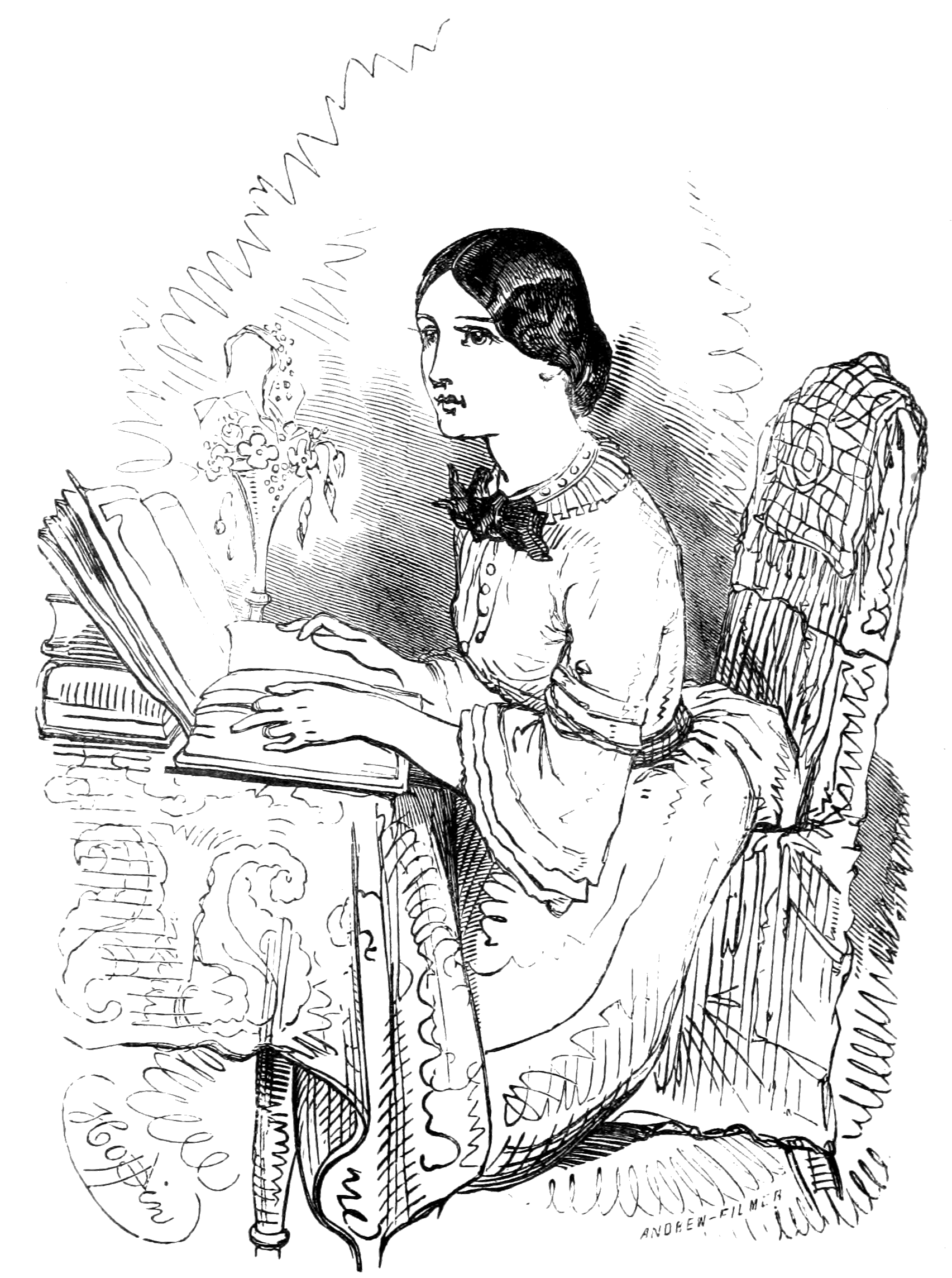

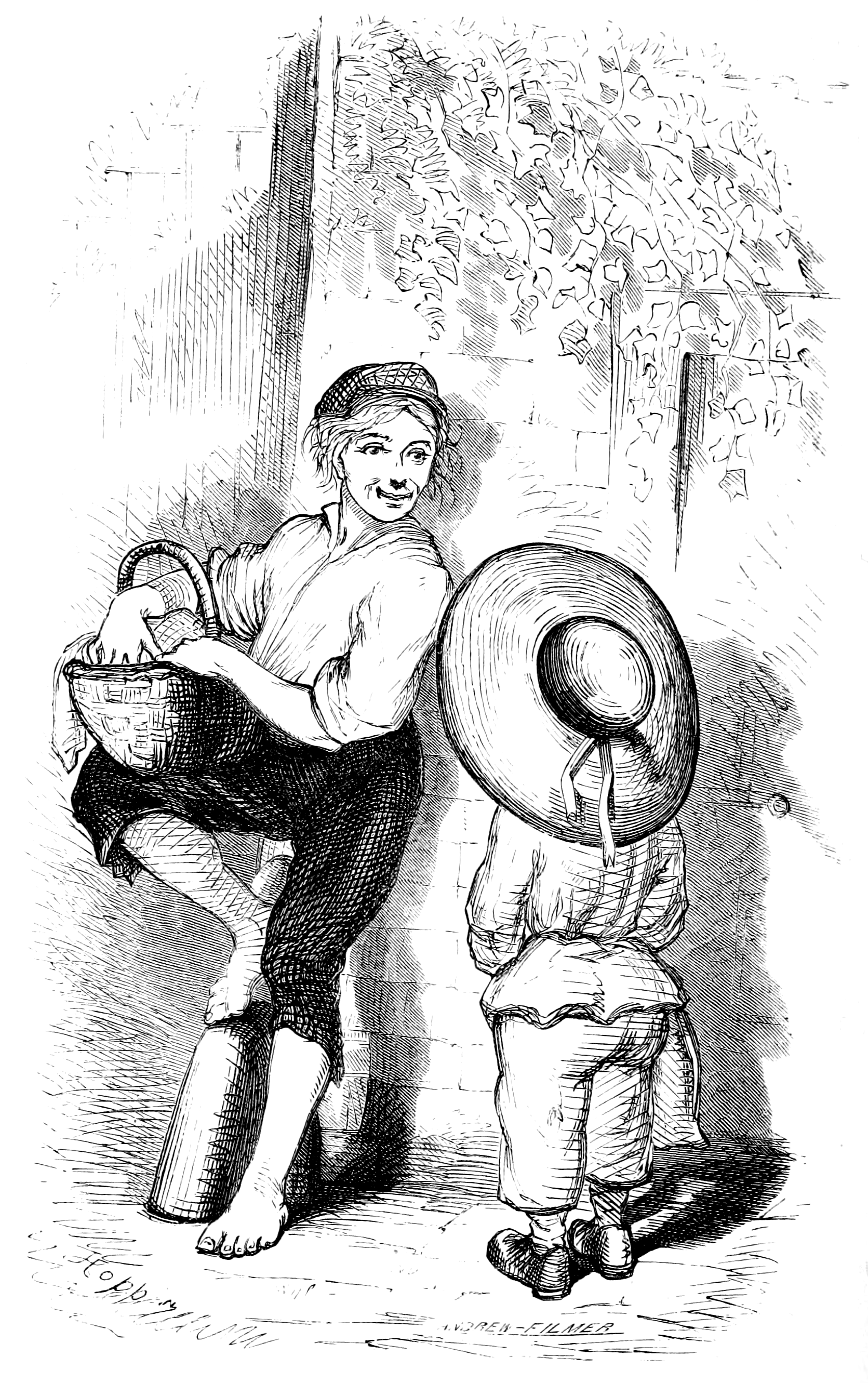

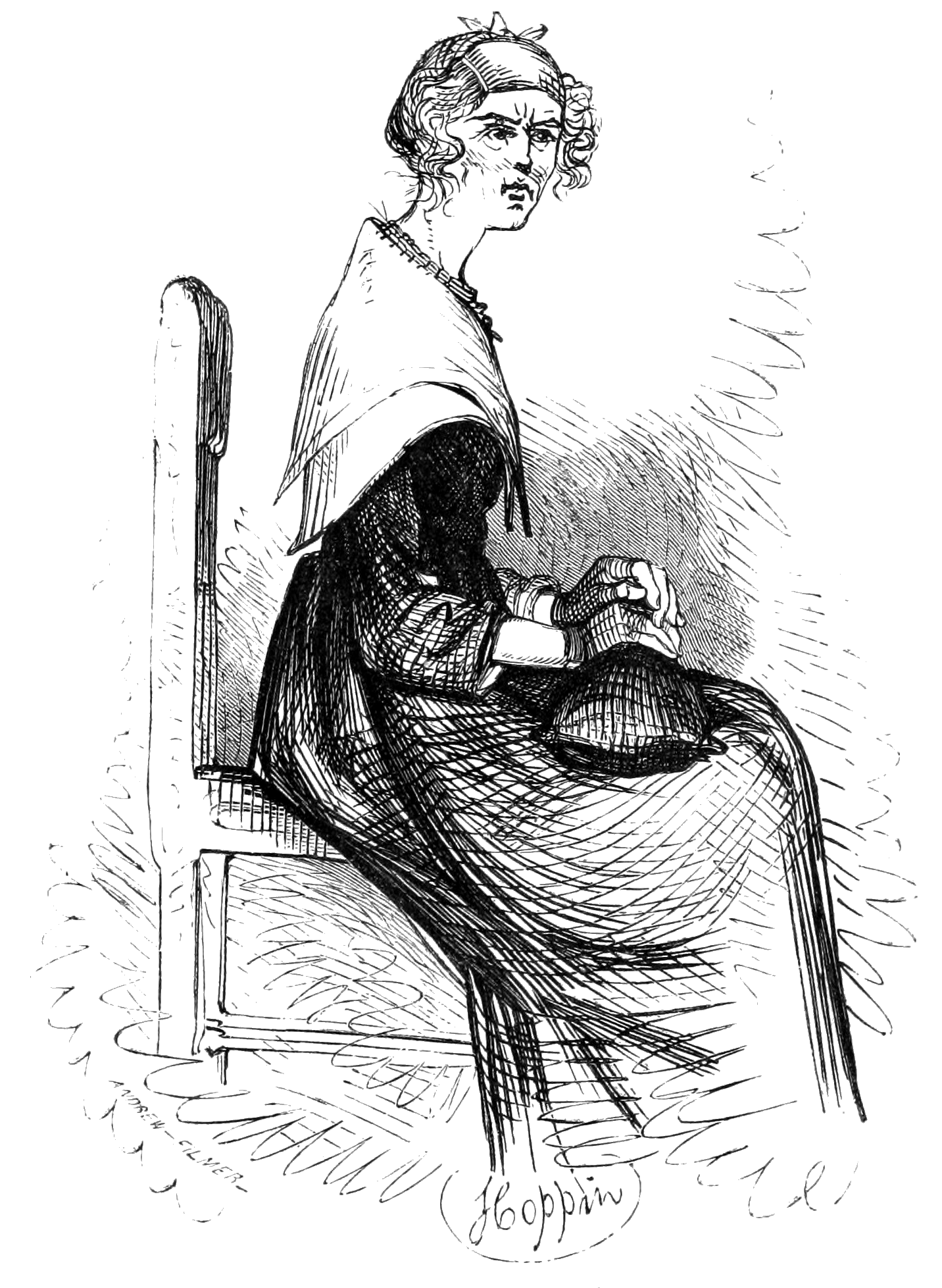

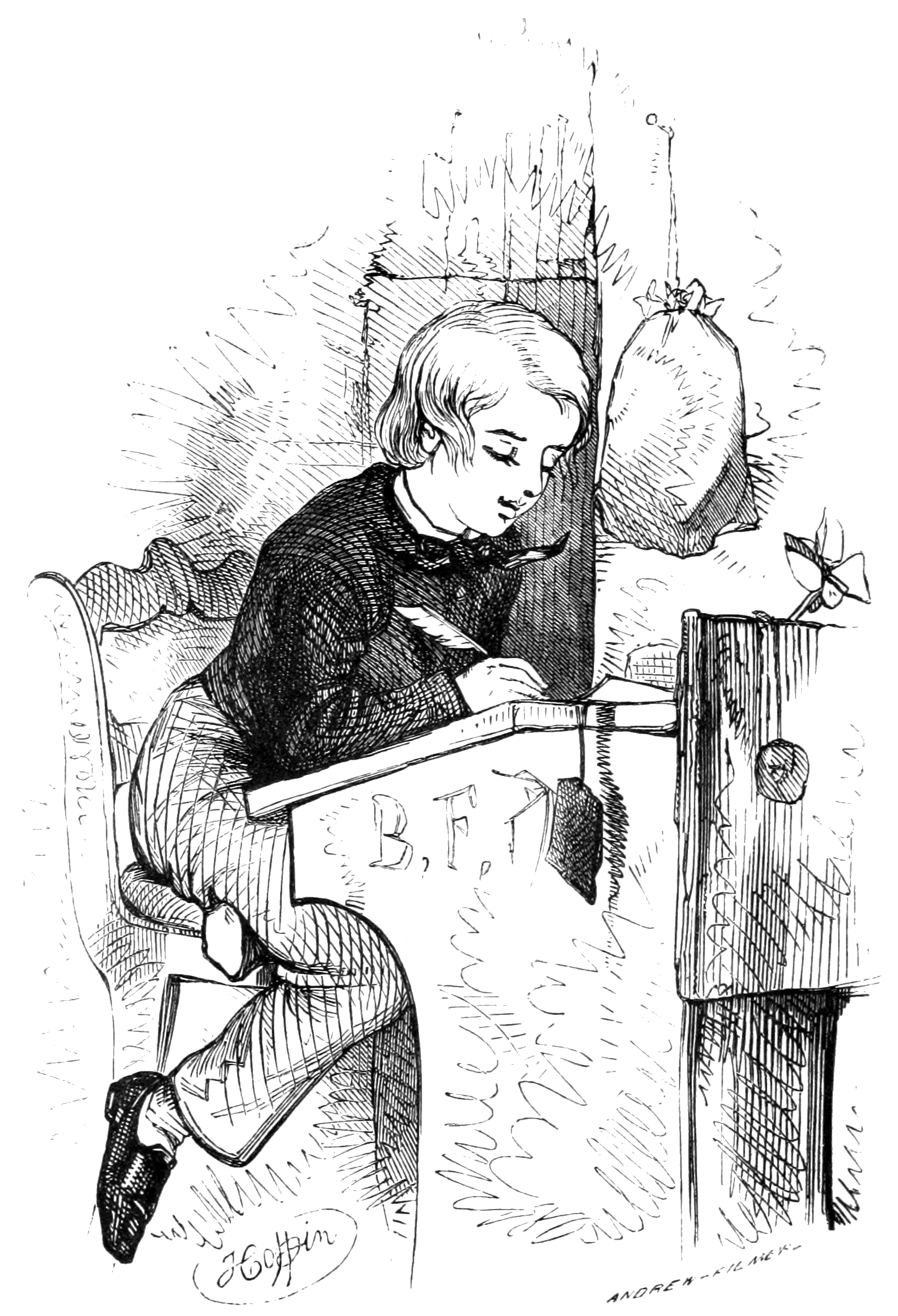

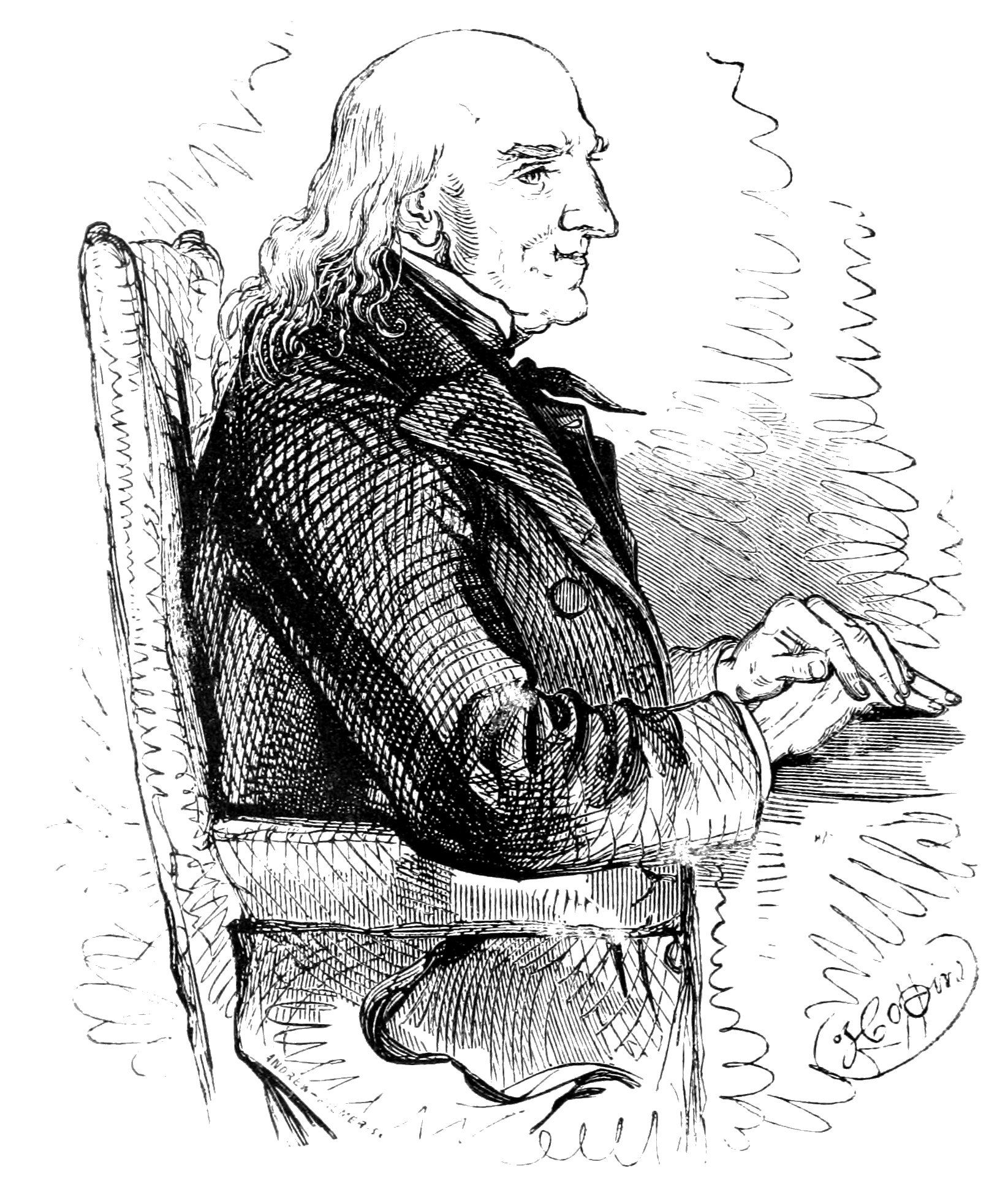

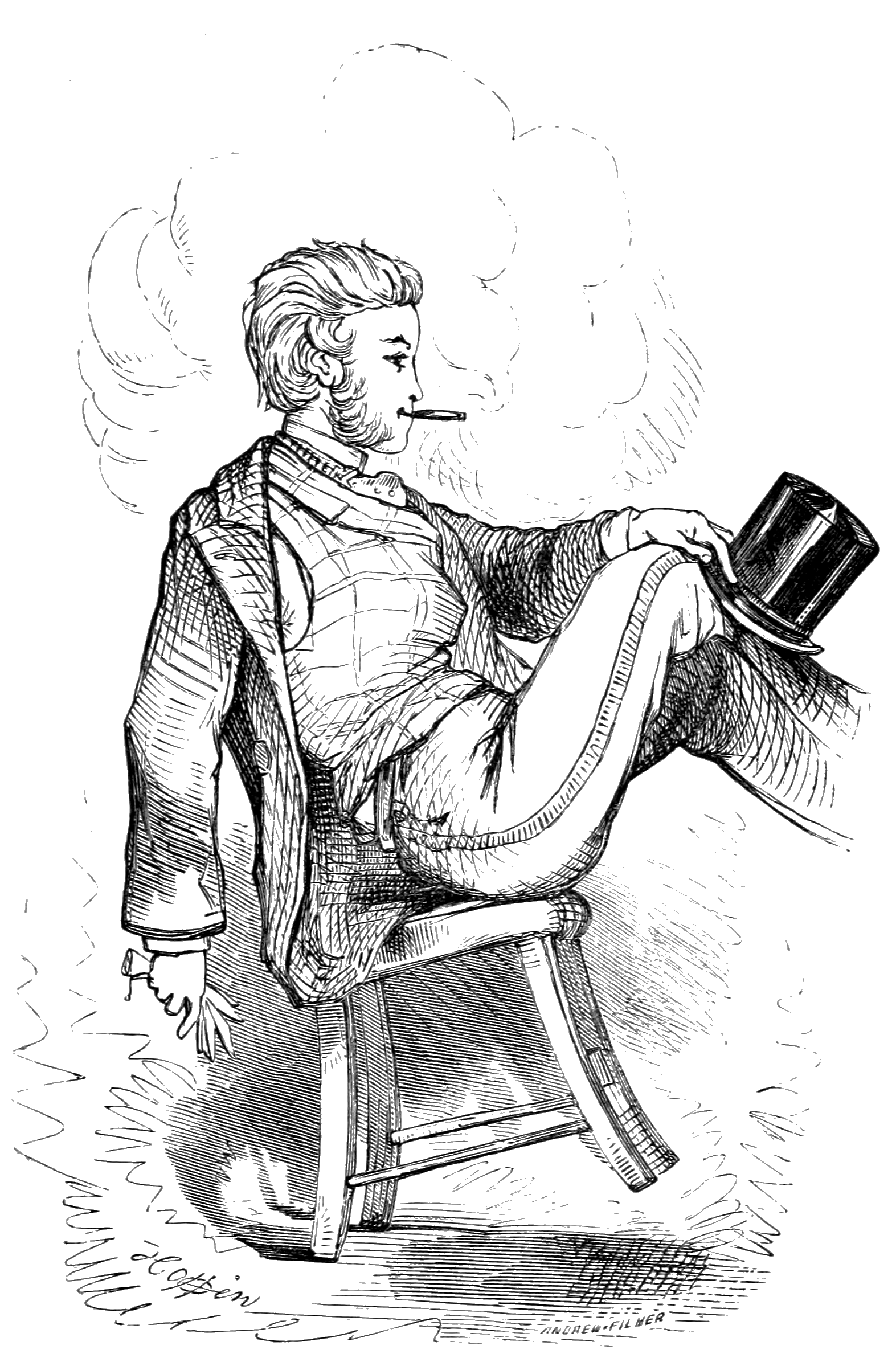

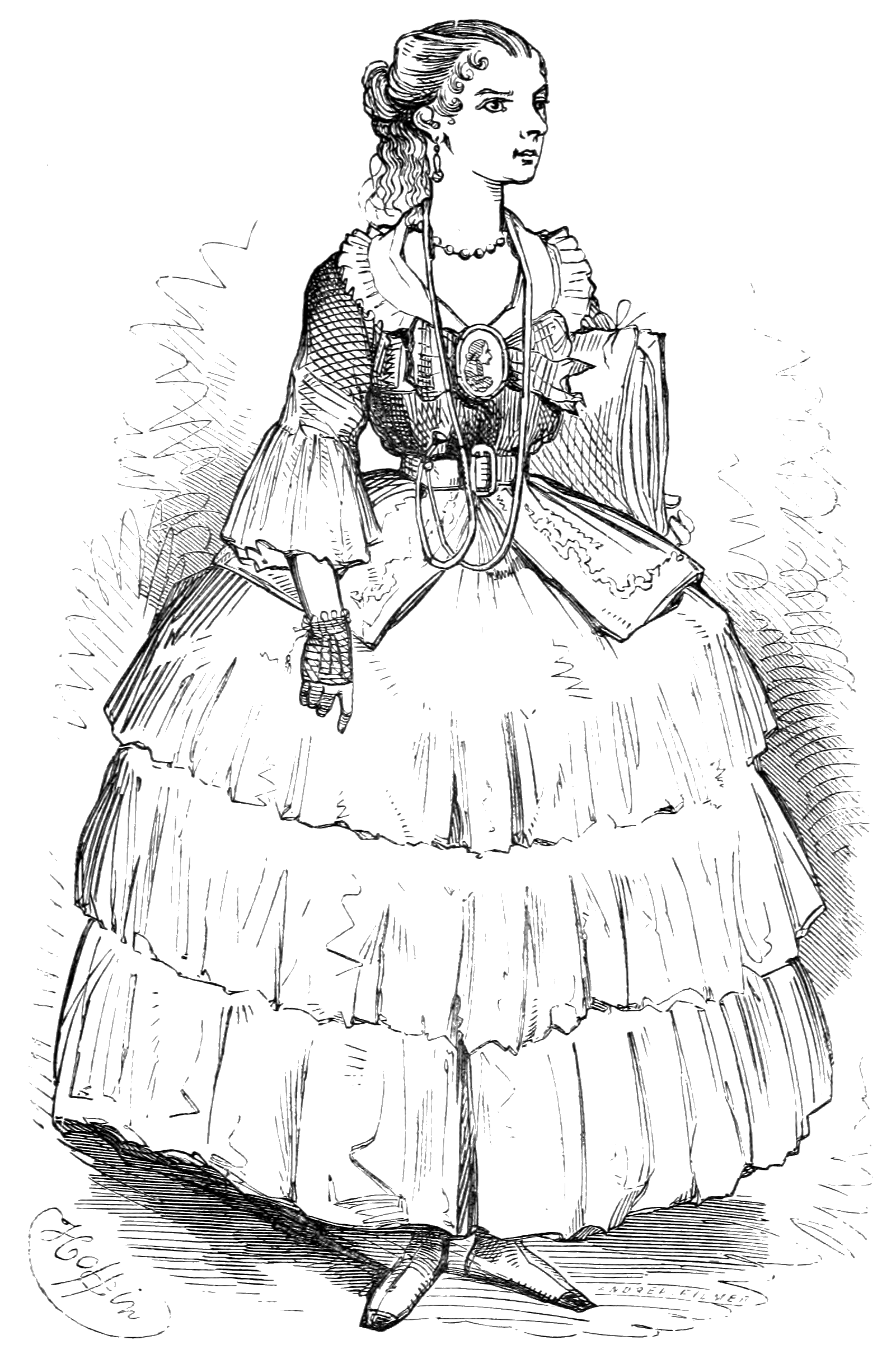

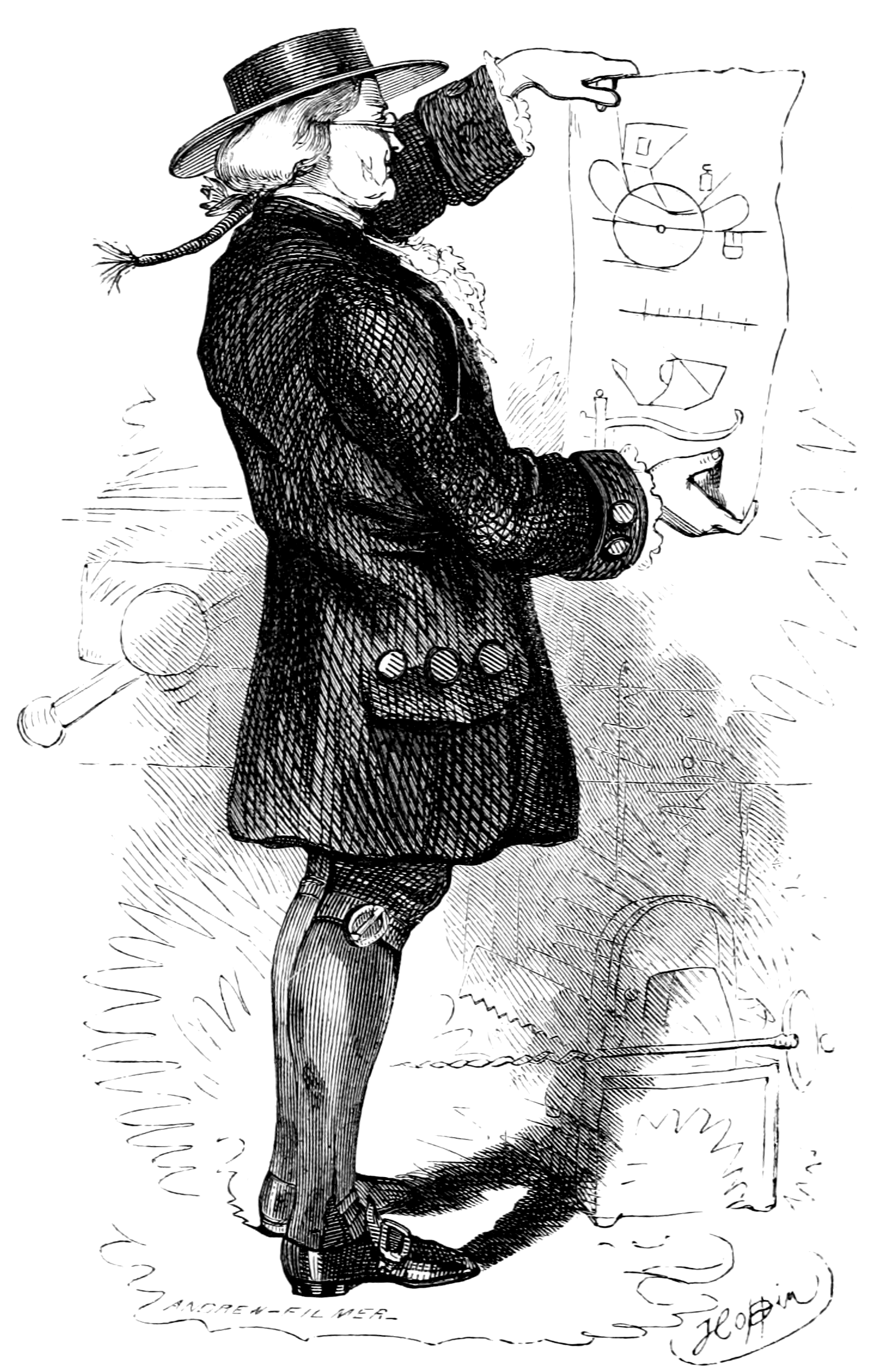

== See also ==
- Holmes v. Hurst: U.S. Supreme Court case over whether the essays were copyrighted
