= Lionel Hitchings =

English cricketer

Lionel Hitchings (born 15 May 1936) was an English cricketer. He was a left-handed batsman and wicket-keeper who played for Buckinghamshire. He was born in Hereford.

Hitchings, who represented Buckinghamshire in the Minor Counties Championship between 1956 and 1968, made a single List A appearance for the side, during the 1965 season, against Middlesex. From the upper-middle order, Hitchings scored 3 runs.
