= Samuel Hawkes =

American politician

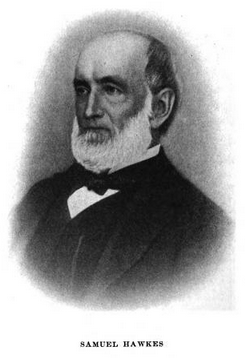

Member of the Massachusetts House of Representatives from Saugus
- In office 1854–1854
- Preceded by: John B. Hitchings
- Succeeded by: Richard Mansfield

Personal details
- Born: December 4, 1816
- Died: March 24, 1903 (aged 86)
- Party: Democratic
- Occupation: Farmer; Politician

Samuel Hawkes was an American politician who represented Saugus in the Massachusetts House of Representatives as a young man. He spoke at Farmers' Institutes and represented the state at the National Farmer's Congress in Missouri. Hawkes belonged to family and local history organizations and served the Saugus community in several capacities.

== Early life ==
Hawkes was born on December 4, 1816, to his mother, Theodate Pratt Hawkes, and father Ahijah Hawkes. His father was the chairman of Saugus' first Board of Selectmen.

His mother descended from immigrant Richard Pratt from Maldon, County of Essex, England; His father from immigrant Adam Hawkes.

== Samuel Hawkes House ==
His home, known as the Samuel Hawkes House, was built by his father about 1800. It was located on the corner of Walnut Street and the Newburyport Turnpike. The property in "Hawkes' Corner" was inhabited by his family since Adam Hawkes, Saugus' first settler settled there in 1638.

Hawkes owned thirteen acres of tillage and ten acres of cranberry bog.

== Career ==
Hawkes, a Democrat, represented Saugus in the Massachusetts House of Representatives in 1854. On April 30, 1861, Hawkes was chosen to serve on a finance committee in the first town meeting related to the Civil War. The committee was responsible to setting the payments to Saugus' soldiers and their families.

Hawkes spoke at many Farmers' Institutes in the United States and served "many years" as the Saugus trustee in the Essex Agricultural Society. In 1891 he was appointed by Governor William Russell to represent Massachusetts at the National Farmers' Congress in Sedalia, Missouri.

In Saugus he served as a Town Moderator. He was chairman on the town's Board of Selectmen and the Overseers of the Poor. In Salem, Hawkes was an expert on woodland titles at the Registry of Deeds; This was a "favorite" position he held late in life. Hawkes was a member of the Sinking Fund Commission since it was organized in 1888; Although he was quite ill, in March 1903 he was reelected.

== Personal life ==
Hawkes was a bachelor and attended meetings of the Society of Friends. He was president of the Hawkes Family Association and member of the Lynn Historical Society.

Hawkes died on March 24, 1903.
