= Albert H. Sweetser =

American snuff manufacturer and politician

Member of the Massachusetts House of Representatives for the 13th Essex District
- In office 1883–1883
- Preceded by: John H. Potter
- Succeeded by: G. Loring Carleton

Personal details
- Born: May 24, 1848 Saugus, Massachusetts
- Died: July 9, 1889 (aged 41) Saugus, Massachusetts
- Party: Republican
- Spouse: Annie Penhallow Jordan (1871–1889; his death)
- Occupation: Snuff manufacturer

Albert Henry Sweetser (May 24, 1848 – July 9, 1889) was an American snuff manufacturer and politician.

== Early life ==
Sweetser was born on May 24, 1848, to George H. and Maria (Starr) Sweetser. He became a member of the Methodist Episcopal Church on October 4, 1863, and served as a steward, trustee, class-leader, and Sunday-school superintendent of the Saugus church. On April 19, 1871, he married Annie Penhallow Jordan in Berwick, Maine. They had three sons, George A., William I., and Philip S. Sweetser. George A. Sweetser was a noted lawyer and rose expert.

== Business career ==
Sweetser inherited his father's interest in Sweetser Brothers, a tobacco firm founded by his grandfather, Charles Sweetser, in 1820. He ran the business with his uncle, Charles A. Sweetser until October 1, 1874, when he sold his interest to his son, Charles H. Sweetser. On January 1, 1881, Albert Sweetser acquired his cousin's interest in the business. In November 1885 he sold the company to Joseph A. Raddin. After leaving the tobacco business, Sweetser was connected with the Maverick Oil Company of East Boston and served as the Boston agent for Standard Oil. Sweetser was also involved in real estate development. He built and developed Jackson Street, Mountain Avenue, and Castle Street in Saugus' Cliftondale neighborhood.

== Politics ==
In 1883, Sweetser represented the 13th Essex District, which consisted of the towns of Saugus, Lynnfield, Middleton, and Topsfield, in the Massachusetts House of Representatives.

== Death ==
Sweetser died on July 9, 1889, after a long illness.
