= William Davies Sohier =

American lawyer and legislator

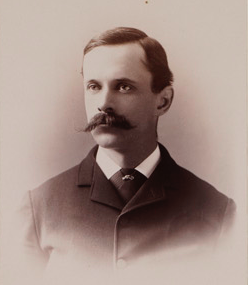

William Davies Sohier (October 22, 1838 – October 15, 1938) was a lawyer and state legislator in Massachusetts. He graduated from Massachusetts Institute of Technology and Harvard Law School. An Independent Republican, he served in the Massachusetts House of Representatives from 1888 to 1891. During that time, he helped defeat a proposal to divide Beverly. He married and had three children.

In 1897 he served as a personal aide to Governor Roger Wolcott. He served as president of the Boston Journal from 1895 to 1900. He chaired the Massachusetts Highway Commission for 15 years.

== See also ==
- 1888 Massachusetts legislature
