= E. T. Slattery =

- Industry: clothing retailer
- Founded: 1867—1957
- Founder: Ellen T. Slattery
- Headquarters: Boston
- Area served: Massachusetts
- Products: Apparel; Accessories

E. T. Slattery was a clothing store situated in downtown Boston throughout the 1800s and 1900s. It was considered a stylish shop offering apparel and other items for men, women, and children.

Ellen T. Slattery founded the store in 1867. She was a female entrepreneur, which, at the point in time, was somewhat unusual. It was first located at Hayward Place off Washington Street, then moved to 631 Tremont Street, then Boylston Street, then 84 Beacon Street, then 156 Tremont Street across from the Boston Common in 1901, where it stayed until 1957, the year it closed.

In 1908, Boston retail veteran P. A. O'Connell, recently a co-proprietor of the Magrane Houston department store, became the long-term president of the company.

In 1913, the store expanded in 158 Tremont Street, taking all five floors of that building. By the 1930s, Slattery occupied three whole adjacent structures.

A branch was established in summer of 1916 in Magnolia, Massachusetts, on Cape Ann, in a purpose-built building at Lexington and Hesperus Avenues, for the summer resort trade. P. A. O'Connell believed in growing the business with branches, and Slattery’s opened a branch in the wealthy suburb of Wellesley in the early 1920s, and another branch in Coolidge Corner in Brookline in April 1927. The Wellesley branch moved to a new, larger site in November 1940, and the company continued to thrive through the 1940s.

However, the company, similar to many urban businesses, experienced a decline during the 1950s as the result of customers relocating to suburban malls. Due to high expenses and an absence of public parking, the Brookline location closed the shop in January 1957. In June 1957, the business was completely shut down. Later, the buildings were removed, and then in 1968, an upscale apartment complex named Tremont on the Common was established on the site.
