= List of United States Supreme Court cases, volume 190 =

Supreme Court of the United States
- Interactive map of Supreme Court of the United States
- 38°53′26″N 77°00′16″W
- Established: March 4, 1789; 236 years ago
- Location: Washington, D.C.
- Coordinates: 38°53′26″N 77°00′16″W
- Composition method: Presidential nomination with Senate confirmation
- Authorised by: Constitution of the United States, Art. III, § 1
- Judge term length: life tenure, subject to impeachment and removal
- Number of positions: 9 (by statute)
- Website: supremecourt.gov

This is a list of cases reported in volume 190 of United States Reports, decided by the Supreme Court of the United States in 1903.

== Justices of the Supreme Court at the time of volume 190 U.S. ==
The Supreme Court is established by Article III, Section 1 of the Constitution of the United States, which says: "The judicial Power of the United States, shall be vested in one supreme Court . . .". The size of the Court is not specified; the Constitution leaves it to Congress to set the number of justices. Under the Judiciary Act of 1789 Congress originally fixed the number of justices at six (one chief justice and five associate justices). Since 1789 Congress has varied the size of the Court from six to seven, nine, ten, and back to nine justices (always including one chief justice).

When the cases in volume 190 were decided the Court comprised the following nine members:

Portrait	Justice	Office	Home State	Succeeded	Date confirmed by the Senate (Vote)	Tenure on Supreme Court
	Melville Fuller	Chief Justice	Illinois	Morrison Waite	July 20, 1888 (41–20)	October 8, 1888 – July 4, 1910 (Died)
	John Marshall Harlan	Associate Justice	Kentucky	David Davis	November 29, 1877 (Acclamation)	December 10, 1877 – October 14, 1911 (Died)
	David Josiah Brewer	Associate Justice	Kansas	Stanley Matthews	December 18, 1889 (53–11)	January 6, 1890 – March 28, 1910 (Died)
	Henry Billings Brown	Associate Justice	Michigan	Samuel Freeman Miller	December 29, 1890 (Acclamation)	January 5, 1891 – May 28, 1906 (Retired)
	Edward Douglass White	Associate Justice	Louisiana	Samuel Blatchford	February 19, 1894 (Acclamation)	March 12, 1894 – December 18, 1910 (Continued as chief justice)
	Rufus W. Peckham	Associate Justice	New York	Howell Edmunds Jackson	December 9, 1895 (Acclamation)	January 6, 1896 – October 24, 1909 (Died)
	Joseph McKenna	Associate Justice	California	Stephen Johnson Field	January 21, 1898 (Acclamation)	January 26, 1898 – January 5, 1925 (Retired)
	Oliver Wendell Holmes Jr.	Associate Justice	Massachusetts	Horace Gray	December 4, 1902 (Acclamation)	December 8, 1902 – January 12, 1932 (Retired)
	William R. Day	Associate Justice	Ohio	George Shiras Jr.	February 23, 1903 (Acclamation)	March 2, 1903 – November 13, 1922 (Retired)

== Citation style ==
Under the Judiciary Act of 1789 the federal court structure at the time comprised District Courts, which had general trial jurisdiction; Circuit Courts, which had mixed trial and appellate (from the US District Courts) jurisdiction; and the United States Supreme Court, which had appellate jurisdiction over the federal District and Circuit courts—and for certain issues over state courts. The Supreme Court also had limited original jurisdiction (i.e., in which cases could be filed directly with the Supreme Court without first having been heard by a lower federal or state court). There were one or more federal District Courts and/or Circuit Courts in each state, territory, or other geographical region.

The Judiciary Act of 1891 created the United States Courts of Appeals and reassigned the jurisdiction of most routine appeals from the district and circuit courts to these appellate courts. The Act created nine new courts that were originally known as the "United States Circuit Courts of Appeals." The new courts had jurisdiction over most appeals of lower court decisions. The Supreme Court could review either legal issues that a court of appeals certified or decisions of court of appeals by writ of certiorari.

Bluebook citation style is used for case names, citations, and jurisdictions.

- "# Cir." = United States Court of Appeals
  - e.g., "3d Cir." = United States Court of Appeals for the Third Circuit
- "C.C.D." = United States Circuit Court for the District of . . .
  - e.g.,"C.C.D.N.J." = United States Circuit Court for the District of New Jersey
- "D." = United States District Court for the District of . . .
  - e.g.,"D. Mass." = United States District Court for the District of Massachusetts
- "E." = Eastern; "M." = Middle; "N." = Northern; "S." = Southern; "W." = Western
  - e.g.,"C.C.S.D.N.Y." = United States Circuit Court for the Southern District of New York
  - e.g.,"M.D. Ala." = United States District Court for the Middle District of Alabama
- "Ct. Cl." = United States Court of Claims
- The abbreviation of a state's name alone indicates the highest appellate court in that state's judiciary at the time.
  - e.g.,"Pa." = Supreme Court of Pennsylvania
  - e.g.,"Me." = Supreme Judicial Court of Maine

== List of cases in volume 190 U.S. ==
Case Name	Page & year	Opinion of the Court	Concurring opinion(s)	Dissenting opinion(s)	Lower Court	Disposition
In re Watts	1 (1903)	Fuller	Harlan	none	D. Ind.	habeas corpus granted
O'Neal v. United States	36 (1903)	Fuller	none	none	N.D. Fla.	dismissed
Tubman v. Baltimore & O.R.R. Co.	38 (1903)	Fuller	none	none	D.C. Cir.	affirmed
Wright v. Henkel	40 (1903)	Fuller	none	none	C.C.S.D.N.Y.	affirmed
Tennessee v. Virginia	64 (1903)	Fuller	none	none	original	boundary set
Montgomery v. City of Portland	89 (1903)	Harlan	none	none	Or.	affirmed
Wilkes Cnty. v. W.N. Coler Co.	107 (1903)	Harlan	none	none	4th Cir.	affirmed
Bockfinger v. Foster	116 (1903)	Harlan	none	none	Sup. Ct. Terr. Okla.	affirmed
James v. Bowman	127 (1903)	Brewer	none	none	W.D. Ky.	affirmed
Swan & Finch Co. v. United States	143 (1903)	Brewer	none	none	Ct. Cl.	affirmed
Mutual R.F.L. Ass'n v. Phelps	147 (1903)	Brewer	none	none	6th Cir.	affirmed
Atlantic & P. Tel. Co. v. City of Philadelphia	160 (1903)	Brewer	none	none	C.C.E.D. Pa.	reversed
Patterson v. Bark Eudora	169 (1903)	Brewer	none	none	3d Cir.	certification
Johanson v. Washington	179 (1903)	Brewer	none	none	Wash.	affirmed
Oregon & C.R.R. Co. v. United States	186 (1903)	Brown	none	none	9th Cir.	reversed
Hawaii v. Mankichi	197 (1903)	Brown	White	Fuller, Harlan	D. Haw.	reversed
Snyder v. Bettman	249 (1903)	Brown	none	White	C.C.S.D. Ohio	affirmed
Mifflin v. R.H. White Co.	260 (1903)	Brown	none	none	1st Cir.	affirmed
Mifflin v. Dutton	265 (1903)	Brown	none	none	1st Cir.	affirmed
Northern P. Ry. Co. v. Townsend	267 (1903)	White	none	none	Minn.	reversed
ICC v. Louisville & N.R.R. Co.	273 (1903)	White	none	none	5th Cir.	affirmed
Texas P. Ry. Co. v. Watson	287 (1903)	White	none	none	5th Cir.	affirmed
Lockwood v. Exchange Bank	294 (1903)	White	none	none	5th Cir.	reversed
Cosmos Explor. Co. v. Gray Eagle O. Co.	301 (1903)	Peckham	none	none	9th Cir.	affirmed
United States ex rel. Riverside O. Co. v. Hitchcock	316 (1903)	Peckham	none	none	D.C. Cir.	affirmed
Southern Ry. Co. v. Allison	326 (1903)	Peckham	none	none	N.C.	reversed
Dunbar v. Dunbar	340 (1903)	Peckham	none	none	Mass. Super. Ct.	affirmed
Buchanan v. Patterson	353 (1903)	Peckham	none	none	Md.	affirmed
Blackfeather v. United States	368 (1903)	Peckham	none	none	Ct. Cl.	affirmed
United States v. Michigan	379 (1903)	Peckham	none	none	original	demurrer overruled
Conley v. Mathieson Alkali Works	406 (1903)	McKenna	none	none	C.C.S.D.N.Y.	affirmed
Western Union Tel. Co. v. Missouri ex rel. Gottlieb	412 (1903)	McKenna	none	none	Mo.	affirmed
Geer v. Mathieson Alkali Works	428 (1903)	McKenna	none	none	C.C.S.D.N.Y.	affirmed
Stanly Cnty. v. W.N. Coler Co.	437 (1903)	McKenna	none	none	4th Cir.	affirmed
Kean v. Calumet C. & I. Co.	452 (1903)	Holmes	none	White	Ind.	affirmed
Hardin v. Shedd	508 (1903)	Holmes	none	White	Ill.	affirmed
Colombia v. Cauca Co.	524 (1903)	Holmes	none	none	4th Cir.	reversed
Randolph v. Scruggs	533 (1903)	Holmes	none	none	6th Cir.	certification
Globe R. Co. v. Landa C.O. Co.	540 (1903)	Holmes	none	none	C.C.W.D. Tex.	affirmed
Queenan v. Oklahoma	548 (1903)	Holmes	none	none	Sup. Ct. Terr. Okla.	affirmed
Hutchinson v. Otis	552 (1903)	Holmes	none	none	1st Cir.	affirmed

== See also ==
- Certificate of division
