= George H. Sweetser =

American tobacco manufacturer and politician

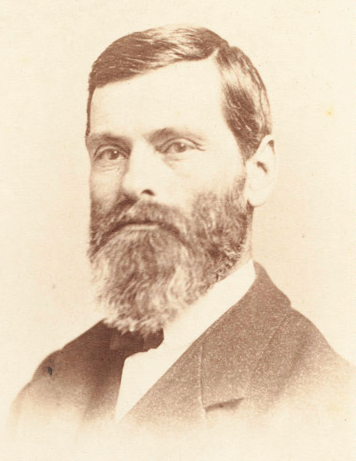

Member of the Massachusetts Senate for the First Essex District
- In office 1869–1869
- Preceded by: William Schouler
- Succeeded by: William W. Kellogg
- In office 1867–1867
- Preceded by: E. R. Mudge
- Succeeded by: William Schouler

Member of the Massachusetts House of Representatives from Saugus
- In office 1852–1852
- Preceded by: Charles Sweetser
- Succeeded by: John B. Hitchings

Personal details
- Born: February 12, 1823 Saugus, Massachusetts
- Died: December 9, 1870 (aged 47) Saugus, Massachusetts
- Spouse: Maria Starr (1843–1870; his death)
- Occupation: Tobacco manufacturer

George Henry Sweetser (February 12, 1823 – December 9, 1870) was an American tobacco manufacturer and politician who served in the Massachusetts General Court.

== Early life and business career ==
Sweetser was born on February 12, 1823, to Charles and Nancy Mansfield Sweetser. On October 14, 1843, he married Maria Starr of Newton Lower Falls. They had two sons, George Menton and Albert H. Sweetser. Sweetser followed his father into the tobacco business and when the elder Sweetser retired in 1860, his business was taken over by George and his brother Charles A., who ran it as Sweetser Brothers.

== Politics ==
Sweetser held numerous political offices in Saugus, Massachusetts. In 1852 he succeeded his father as Saugus' state representative. In 1860 he was appointed postmaster of Cliftondale. He represented the First Essex the Massachusetts Senate in 1867 and 1869. Sweester died on December 9, 1870, at the age of 47. Zion's Herald reported his cause of death as "congestion of the lungs".
