= Governor Wolcott =

Governor Wolcott may refer to:

- Oliver Wolcott (1726–1797), 19th Governor of Connecticut
- Oliver Wolcott Jr. (1760–1833), 24th Governor of Connecticut
- Roger Wolcott (Massachusetts politician) (1847–1900), 39th Governor of Massachusetts
