= E. Gerry Brown =

American politician (1850–1928)

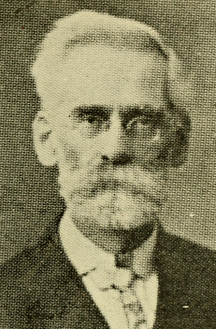

Member of the Massachusetts House of Representatives for the 20th Plymouth district
- In office 1920

Personal details
- Born: April 15, 1850 Boston, Massachusetts, U.S.
- Died: August 30, 1928 (aged 78) Brockton, Massachusetts, U.S.
- Party: Republican (until 1891); Populist (1891–1899); Democratic (1899–1905); Independence (1905–1908); Democratic (1908–1915); Independent (1916–1919); Democratic (1919–1926); Republican (1926–1928)

Elbridge Gerry Brown (April 15, 1850 – August 30, 1928) was an American journalist and politician who was a founding member of the Populist and Independence parties. He was the Populist nominee for Governor of Massachusetts in 1895 and the Independence nominee for Lieutenant Governor in 1906 and 1907. He served on the Boston Common Council as a member of the Republican Party and in the Massachusetts House of Representatives as a Democrat.

== Early life ==
Brown was born in Boston's North End on April 15, 1850. He graduated from The English High School.

== Journalism ==
After serving as a printer's apprentice, Brown worked on the staff of the Commercial Bulletin. In 1870, he was a legislative reporter for The Boston Post. As the city and night editor of the Boston Evening Gazette, he covered the Great Boston Fire of 1872. Not long after Charles H. Taylor founded The Boston Globe, Brown went to work for him. He then served as business manager of the Boston Journal of Commerce. In 1874, he founded The Spiritual Scientist, a weekly journal dedicated to the teachings of spiritualism. In 1878, Brown became owner and editor of the Bunker Hill Times. Upon moving to Brockton, Massachusetts, Brown started the Diamond, which was dedicated to labor interests.

== Politics ==
=== Early work ===
Brown began his involvement in politics as a member of the Republican Party. In 1884, he was a member of the Boston Common Council.

=== Populist Party ===
Brown attended the Cincinnati Populist Convention of 1891. On March 30, 1892, he chaired the inaugural meeting of the Massachusetts Citizen's Party. He headed the Massachusetts delegation at the 1892 Populist Party Convention in Omaha, Nebraska, which saw the adoption of the Omaha Platform.

Brown was the party's nominee for the United States House of Representatives seat in Massachusetts's 6th congressional district in the 1892 election. In 1894, he was the party's nominee in the 12th congressional district. Brown was the Populist candidate in the 1895 Massachusetts gubernatorial election. He finished a distant fourth with over 2% of the vote.

Brown led the Massachusetts delegation at the 1896 Populist National Convention. The delegation was strongly against nominating Arthur Sewall for vice president and instead backed Brown for the position. The nomination would ultimately go to Thomas E. Watson.

In 1896 United States House of Representatives elections, Brown received both the Populist and Democratic nominations in the 12th congressional district. He was defeated by Republican William C. Lovering 77% to 23%.

=== Democratic Party ===
In 1899, Brown was the Democratic candidate for Massachusetts State Auditor after Walter L. Ramsdell dropped out of the race. He lost to Republican incumbent John W. Kimball 162,695 votes to 95,990. He won the nomination again in 1900, but lost to Henry E. Turner 206,301 votes to 125,742.

=== Independence League ===
Brown became involved with the Independence League during its early days and was the party's nominee for Lieutenant Governor in 1905. He was one of three Independence nominees to be also nominated by the Democratic party (the others being gubernatorial nominee John B. Moran and nominee for auditor, Thomas L. Hisgen). Brown lost a close race to Eben Sumner Draper, 200,747 votes to 191,138.

Brown sought both the Independence and Democratic nominations for Lieutenant Governor in the 1906 election. He was nominated by the Independence League, but as a condition of receiving the nomination, could not seek the Democratic nomination. He finished far behind Eben Sumner Draper, but 1,281 votes ahead of the Democratic nominee, George A. Schofield.

=== Return to the Democratic Party ===
Brown sought the Democratic nomination for governor in the 1908 Massachusetts gubernatorial election. After James H. Vahey got off to a large lead at the state Democratic convention, Brown withdrew and endorsed Vahey.

Brown backed Eugene Foss in the 1910 Massachusetts gubernatorial election. In 1911, Foss appointed Brown to the newly created position of supervisor of small loans. On December 26, 1914, Governor David I. Walsh and the Massachusetts Governor's Council held a special meeting to review complaints against Brown. Brown was accused of permitting extortionate loans, granting licences to known loan sharks, failing to prosecute violators of the law, and having close financial ties to money lenders. On January 1, 1915, Walsh removed Brown with the unanimous approval of the Governor's Council. Brown denied the accusations and asked the state legislature to investigate his former department. temporary replacement. George C. Neal, deputy chief of the Massachusetts State Police and Brown's temporary successor as state supervisor of small loans found that Brown had acted in good faith and had not violated any law. On February 2, 1915, the Republican-led Legislative Joint Committee on Rules reported that no action was necessary, with the Democratic members dissenting.

=== Later involvement ===
Brown was elected as the 10th Plymouth district's delegate to the Massachusetts Constitutional Convention of 1917–1918 as an independent. He represented the same district in the Massachusetts House of Representatives in the 1920 Massachusetts legislature. His final bid for public office was in 1926, when he ran as a Republican for the 9th Plymouth district seat in the Massachusetts House of Representatives. He finished in last place in the four candidate primary. Brown died on August 30, 1928, at his home in Brockton.

Party political offices
Preceded by George H. Cary	Populist nominee for Governor of Massachusetts; 1895	Succeeded by George F. Williams
Preceded by Charles F. Parker	Democratic nominee for Massachusetts State Auditor; 1899, 1900	Succeeded by James F. Dean
Preceded by Henry Melville Whitney	Democratic nominee for Lieutenant Governor of Massachusetts; 1906	Succeeded by George A. Schofield
First	Independence League nominee for Lieutenant Governor of Massachusetts; 1906, 1907	Succeeded by Robert J. McCartney
