= Garrett Droppers =

American academic and diplomat

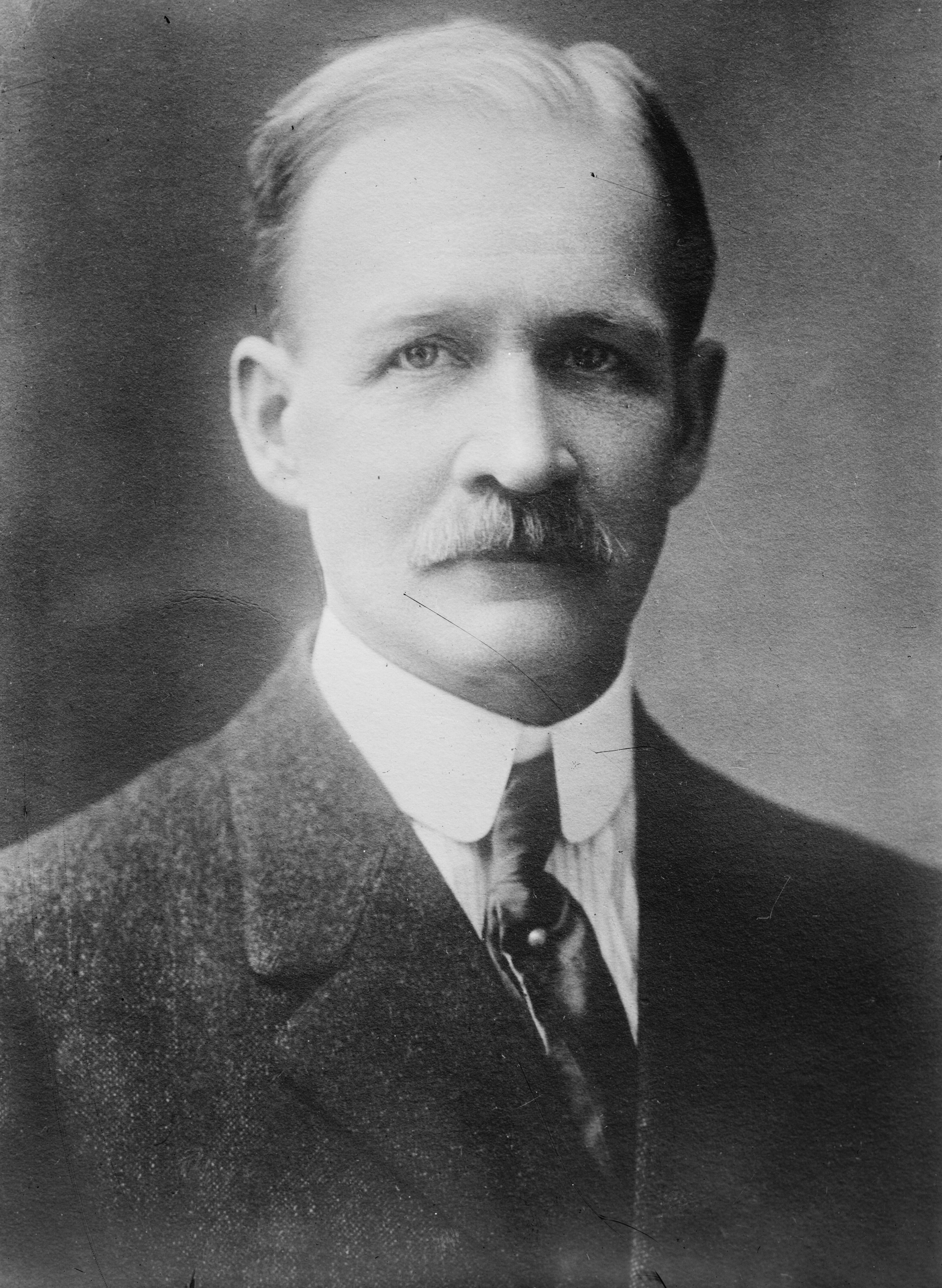

United States Ambassador to Greece
- In office October 9, 1914 – April 16, 1920
- Preceded by: George F. Williams
- Succeeded by: Edward Capps

United States Ambassador to Montenegro
- In office November 20, 1914 – December 4, 1918
- Preceded by: George F. Williams
- Succeeded by: Roderick W. Moore

Personal details
- Born: April 12, 1860 Milwaukee, Wisconsin
- Died: July 7, 1927 (aged 67) Williamstown, Massachusetts
- Party: Democratic Party
- Education: Harvard University
- Profession: Academic, diplomat
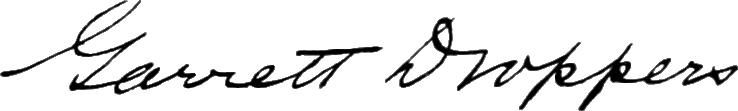
- Signature

Garrett Droppers (April 12, 1860 – July 7, 1927) was an academic and diplomat from the United States.

== Biography ==
Droppers was born in Milwaukee, Wisconsin to John and Gertrude Droppers on April 12, 1860. He graduated from Harvard University. In 1889, he married Cora Rand, who died in 1896, and in 1897 he married Jean Tewkesbury Rand.

From 1898 to 1906, he served as president of the University of South Dakota. In 1912, he was a delegate to the Democratic National Convention. Droppers was appointed by Woodrow Wilson as U.S. Ambassador to Greece and Montenegro from 1914 to 1920.

Garrett Droppers died on July 7, 1927, in Williamstown, Massachusetts.

== See also ==
- United States Ambassador to Greece
- United States Ambassador to Montenegro
