= 1908 Massachusetts gubernatorial election =

- November 4, 1908
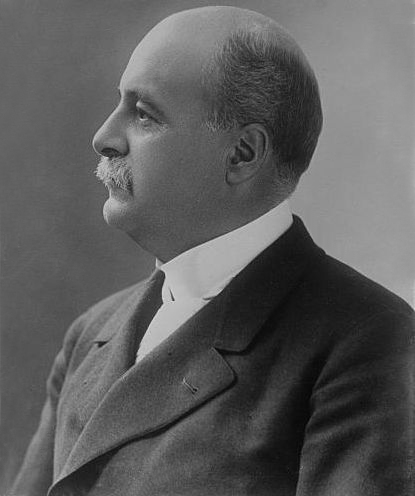

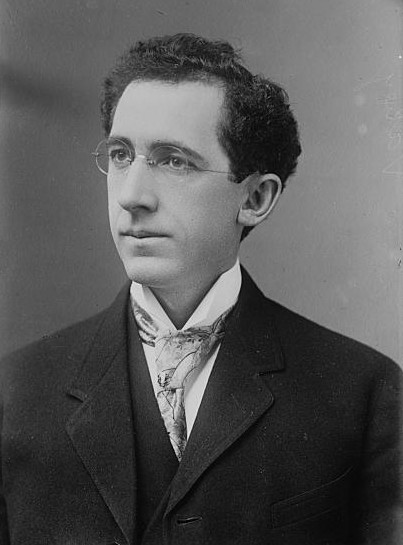

Nominee	Eben S. Draper	James H. Vahey	William N. Osgood
Party	Republican	Democratic	Independence
Popular vote	228,318	168,162	23,101
Percentage	51.59%	38.00%	5.22%
- Draper: 40-50% 50–60% 60–70% 70–80% 80–90% >90% Vahey: 40-50% 50–60% 60–70%
Governor before election
Curtis Guild, Jr.
Republican
Elected Governor
Eben S. Draper
Republican

The 1908 Massachusetts gubernatorial election was held on November 4, 1908.

== Democratic nomination ==
=== Governor ===
==== Candidates ====
- James H. Vahey, state senator from Watertown

===== Withdrew =====
- E. Gerry Brown, labor leader

==== Results ====
Vahey was unopposed for the Democratic nomination.

== General election ==
=== Results ===
==== Governor ====
1908 Massachusetts gubernatorial election
Party	Candidate	Votes	%	±%
Republican	Eben S. Draper	228,318	51.59%	
Democratic	James H. Vahey	168,162	38.00%	
Independence	William N. Osgood	23,101	5.22%	
Socialist	James F. Carey	14,430	3.26%	
Prohibition	Willard O. Wylie	5,966	1.35%	
Socialist Labor	Walter J. Hoar	2,567	0.58%	
Others	Others	5	0.00%	

==== Lt. governor ====
Massachusetts lieutenant gubernatorial election, 1908
Party	Candidate	Votes	%	±%
Republican	Louis A. Frothingham	240,356	56.61%	
Democratic	Charles J. Barton	144,049	33.93%	
Independence	Robert J. McCartney	19,904	4.69%	
Socialist	John Hall, Jr.	11,619	2.74%	
Prohibition	Frank N. Rand	5,760	1.36%	
Socialist Labor	Joao Claudino	2,846	0.67%	
Others	Others	17	0.00%	
Total votes		424,551	100.00%	

== See also ==
- 1908 Massachusetts legislature
- 1908 Massachusetts Senate election
