= James H. Vahey =

American politician

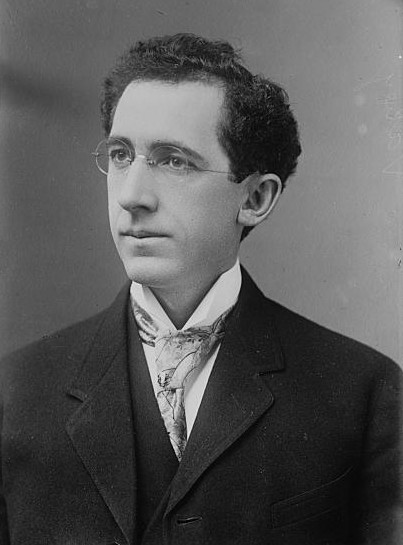
- Born: December 29, 1871; Watertown, Massachusetts, U.S.
- Died: April 7, 1929 (aged 57); Watertown, Massachusetts, U.S.
- Occupation: Lawyer
- Known for: Democratic nominee for Governor of Massachusetts (1908, 1909); Lawyer for Charles L. Tucker; General Counsel for the AASEREA
- Relatives: James H. Vahey Jr. (son); John P. Vahey (brother)

James Henry Vahey (December 29, 1871 – April 7, 1929) was an American lawyer and politician.

== Early life ==
Vahey was born on December 29, 1871, in Watertown, Massachusetts. His parents were Irish immigrants who came to the United States in 1869 and ran a grocery store in Watertown. Vahey was one of seven children. One of his brothers, John P. Vahey, was the defense attorney for Bartolomeo Vanzetti.

Vahey was valedictorian of the Watertown High School class of 1888 and graduated from Boston University Law School in 1892. On February 18, 1897, he married Margaret White in Concord, Massachusetts. They had six children, including future Massachusetts Democratic State Committee Chair James H. Vahey Jr.

== Defense lawyer ==
In 1893, Vahey was admitted to the bar and entered the law office of Allen and Howland. In 1898 he and a co-worker, Charles Hiller Innes, started their own firm. In 1905 Philip Mansfield became a member of the firm.

In June 1904, Vahey was appointed senior counsel for Charles L. Tucker, a 23-year-old drifter who was accused of entering the home of Mabel Page and stabbing her to death. Tucker was found guilty on January 24, 1905, after a well-publicized trial. Vahey appealed the conviction to the Massachusetts Supreme Judicial Court and presented Governor Curtis Guild Jr. with a petition containing 116,000 signatures. The court upheld the conviction, Guild declined clemency, and on June 12, 1906, Tucker was executed in the electric chair.

In 1905, Vahey, Innes, and Mansfield defended Dr. Percy D. McLeod, a personal friend of Innes' who was accused of being an accessory after the fact in the death of Susanna Geary, a dancer who had died following an abortion performed by another doctor. McLeod was found not guilty.

In 1909, Vahey replaced his brother John as junior counsel for James M. Harmon Jr., a 19-year-old accused of shooting Maud H. Hartley to death. Another brother, Thomas F. Vahey, served as senior counsel. During the later stages of the trial, Harmon agreed to plead guilty to murder in the second degree and was sentenced to life in prison.

== Political career ==
=== Local office ===
A few weeks after reaching voting age, Vahey was elected to Watertown's school board. He was reelected in 1896 and served until 1899. He concurrently served on the Watertown board of health. In this position, Vahey took up legal proceedings against the town of Newton, Massachusetts for discharging sewage into a brook that flowed through Watertown. From 1897 to 1901, Vahey served on the board of selectmen. Vahey also served four years as town moderator. He was the youngest man and first Catholic elected to that position. Outside of government, Vahey also served as president of the Watertown YMCA and was the first Grand Knight of the Watertown council of the Knights of Columbus.

=== Presidential politics ===
Vahey represented Massachusetts's 12th congressional district as a delegate to the 1904 Democratic National Convention. He was pledged to Richard Olney, whose law office had been on the same floor as Allen and Howland when Vahey worked there. He defeated former Congressman George F. Williams, who was a backer of William Randolph Hearst. Vahey was also a delegate to the 1924 Democratic National Convention, where he backed Al Smith.

=== State Senate ===
In 1906, Vahey was elected to the Massachusetts Senate seat in the 1st Middlesex District. During his tenure in the Senate, Vahey led the fight for abolition for capital punishment, citing his experience with Charles L. Tucker, whom he believed to be innocent, as influencing his position. He also wrote legislation to prevent the proposed merger of the Boston & Maine and New York, New Haven, & Hartford railroads.

=== Campaigns for Governor ===
On May 14, 1908, Vahey announced that he was entering the race for Governor of Massachusetts. He won the Democratic nomination unanimously after labor leader E. Gerry Brown withdrew his candidacy and supported him. The Democrats were poorly organized, with Vahey failing to get support from old-line Democrats and the Boston political machine and Republican Eben Sumner Draper defeated Vahey 52% to 38%.

Vahey ran for governor again in 1909 and defeated Fall River Mayor John T. Coughlin 384 votes to 198 to win the Democratic nomination. Former Republican Eugene Foss was selected to be his running mate. On October 12, while returning from a rally in Lowell, Massachusetts, Vahey and William Francis Murray saw flames coming from a room in a tenement house. The two ran to the room, carried an unconscious man out of his burning bed, and put out the fire. Vahey ran a much more competitive campaign in 1909, running on a platform supporting tariff reform and the creation of an income tax. However, he was again defeated by Draper, this time less than 8,000 votes. Vahey considered the result a moral victory, declaring that the "Republican machine of state has been taught a lesson".

On April 9, 1910, Vahey announced his third run for governor. Vahey stated that he had been assured that Foss, who had been elected to the United States House of Representatives earlier that year, would not run for governor. On September 21, Foss stated that he would "not lift a finger for the nomination. I have said that I will not be a candidate against James H. Vahey and I am adhering strictly to that statement". On the first ballot for governor at the Democratic state convention, Foss received 383 votes to Vahey's 302 with a third candidate, Charles Sumner Hamlin receiving 295. On the second ballot, Foss received 438 and Vahey received 425 with Hamlin losing all but 20 of his delegates. With the convention hopelessly deadlocked, Frederick W. Mansfield was chosen as the party's provisional nominee and a special committee was formed to choose the party's nominees for Governor and Lieutenant Governor. If a candidate could not be agreed upon by the committee, the nomination would go to Mansfield. The committee also deadlocked, this time between Foss and Hamlin, and it was decided that the nomination would go to the winner of a mail poll of the convention delegates. Foss defeated Hamlin by a single vote in a mail election to win the nomination.

== Labor counsel ==
From 1912 until his death, Vahey served as an attorney for the Boston Street Carmen's Union. He also served as general counsel for the Amalgamated Association of Street and Electric Railway Employees of America. In 1919 he was retained by the Boston Policemen's Union, which was fighting for official recognition. Police Commissioner Edwin Upton Curtis refused to recognize the union, which led to the 1919 Boston Police Strike.

Vahey died on April 7, 1929, at his home in Watertown.

== See also ==
- 128th Massachusetts General Court (1907)

Party political offices
Preceded by Henry Melville Whitney	Democratic nominee for Governor of Massachusetts; 1908, 1909	Succeeded by Eugene Foss
