= Charles J. Barton =

American politician (1855–1923)

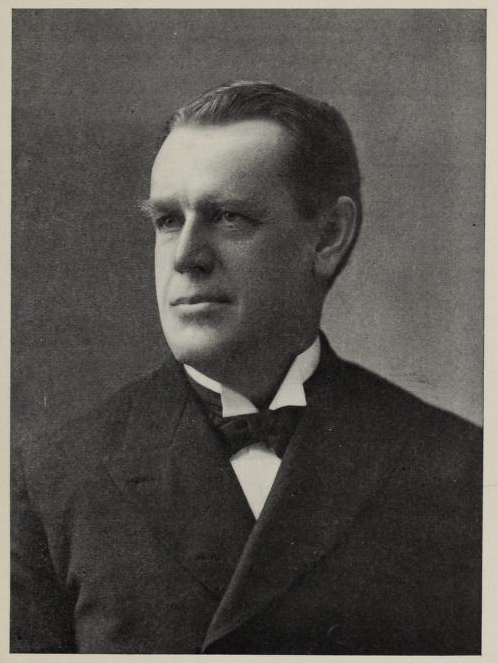

Mayor of Melrose, Massachusetts
- In office 1906
- Preceded by: Sidney H. Buttrick
- Succeeded by: Eugene H. Moore

Personal details
- Born: August 21, 1855 Boston, Massachusetts, U.S.
- Died: September 28, 1923 (aged 68) Melrose, Massachusetts, U.S.
- Party: Democratic

Charles James Barton (August 21, 1855 – September 28, 1923) was an American politician who was the mayor of Melrose, Massachusetts in 1906 and the Democratic Party nominee for Lieutenant Governor of Massachusetts in 1908.

== Early life ==
Barton was born in Boston on August 21, 1855. He was educated in the Boston Public Schools and spent thirty years working for Charles & Moody & Co., a Boston wholesale grocery business.

== Politics ==
In 1880, Barton moved to Melrose, Massachusetts. He served on the town's board of selectmen in 1899 and when it switched to a city form of government the following year, served on its first board of aldermen. In the 1905 mayoral election, he defeated incumbent Sidney H. Buttrick by 23 votes. He was the first Democrat to serve as Mayor of Melrose. He ran for reelection on a Citizens' ticket, but lost to alderman Eugene H. Moore by 42 votes.

At the 1908 state Democratic convention, Barton, Roger Sherman Hoar, and William P. Hayes made up the committee which reported the nomination for all offices except for governor. United Textile Workers of America president John Golden was believed to be the frontrunner to be the party's nominee for Lieutenant Governor. However, opposition from his hometown of Fall River, Massachusetts (led by Mayor John T. Coughlin) and E. Gerry Brown's defeat for the gubernatorial nomination led Golden to announce that he would not accept a spot on the ticket. This left Barton, who was nominated by Hoar and Hayes, unopposed. Barton lost the general election to Republican Louis A. Frothingham 57% to 34%.

In 1914, Barton was appointed to the Metropolitan Park Commission by Governor David I. Walsh. He served on the commission from August 24, 1914 to May 7, 1919.

== Personal life and death ==
Barton was exalted ruler of the Melrose Benevolent and Protective Order of Elks lodge and was president of the state association from 1919 to 1920. He was also a member of Hugh de Payens Commandery of the Knights Templar, the Wyoming Lodge of the Freemasons, and Melrose Lodge of the Independent Order of Odd Fellows and president of the Melrose Athletic Club.

Barton died on September 28, 1923 at his home in Melrose. He was survived by his wife and a daughter.

Party political offices
Preceded by George A. Schofield	Democratic nominee for Lieutenant Governor of Massachusetts; 1908	Succeeded by Eugene Foss
