= George A. Schofield =

American politician (1863–1944)

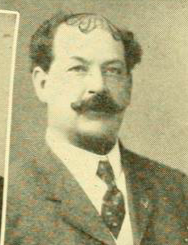

Member of the Massachusetts Senate for the Third Essex district
- In office 1912
- Preceded by: James E. Tolman
- Succeeded by: C. Augustus Norwood
- In office 1906
- Preceded by: Moody Kimball
- Succeeded by: James F. Shaw

Member of the Massachusetts House of Representatives for the 22nd Essex district
- In office 1902–1905

Personal details
- Born: April 26, 1863 Ipswich, Massachusetts, U.S.
- Died: October 27, 1944 (aged 81) Ipswich, Massachusetts, U.S.
- Party: Democratic

George Albert Schofield (April 26, 1863 – October 27, 1944) was an American politician who was a member of the Massachusetts House of Representatives (1902–1905) and Massachusetts Senate (1906, 1912). He was an unsuccessful candidate for the United States House of Representatives seat in Massachusetts's 6th congressional district (1906, 1912, 1914, and 1917) and Lieutenant Governor of Massachusetts (1907).

== Early life ==
Schofield was born on April 26, 1863, in Ipswich, Massachusetts. His father, Cornelius Schofield, served in the Union army during the American Civil War and died from wounds he received in the Siege of Petersburg. Schofield was educated in the Ipswich public schools and graduated from Manning High School in 1881.

== Journalism ==
After graduating, Schofield joined The Salem Evening News as a corrospondent. In 1891, he became the manager of the Ipswich Chronicle. Schofield and the Chronicle were a leading opponent of the strikers during the 1913 Ipswich Mills strike. His son, George A. Schofield Jr., took charge of the paper in 1926, but he died the following year.

== Politics ==
Schofield served on a number of boards and committees in Ipswich, including the board of assessor and overseers of the poor. He championed a number of improvements in the town, including the creation of a free municipal water supply and a municipal lighting plant. In 1897, he was appointed postmaster of Ipswich by President Grover Cleveland.

In 1901, Schofield was elected to his first of four consecutive terms in the Massachusetts House of Representatives. Although a Democrat, Schofield was successful in getting votes from Republicans in the traditionally Republican district. In 1905, he ran for the Third Essex district seat in the Massachusetts Senate. With the support of laborers, the Henry Cabot Lodge political machine, and fishing owners, he defeated Republican James F. Shaw by 280 votes in a district that had been won by the Republican Moody Kimball a year prior.

Schofield was encouraged to run for governor in the 1906 Massachusetts gubernatorial election, but instead chose to seek the United States House of Representatives seat in Massachusetts's 6th congressional district. He lost to Republican incumbent Augustus P. Gardner 55% to 42%.

Schofield supported Henry Melville Whitney in the 1907 Massachusetts gubernatorial election. Whitney's campaign managers believed that Schofield was one of their best speakers and made him the Whitney candidate for Lieutenant Governor. The Democratic convention was held in Springfield on October 5. Whitney delegates gained control of the convention hall and barred Charles W. Bartlett's delegates from entry. The Bartlett delegates assembled themselves to nominate their candidate and adopt their own platform. Schofield was nominated for Lieutenant Governor by the Whitney faction. In the general election, Schofield finished third behind Republican Eben Sumner Draper and Independence League candidate E. Gerry Brown.

Schofield returned to the Senate in 1912 by defeating Republican incumbent James E. Tolman. He was an unsuccessful candidate for the 6th congressional district seat in 1912, 1914, and 1917.

== Legal career ==
Schofield began studying law at the age of fifty. He was a member of the firm Hayes and Schofield with George H. W. Hayes. Schofield was a special justice of the Ipswich district court from 1913 to 1914 and clerk of the court from 1914 until 1923. He was Ipswich's town counsel until his death in 1944.

Party political offices
Preceded by E. Gerry Brown	Democratic nominee for Lieutenant Governor of Massachusetts; 1907	Succeeded by Charles J. Barton
