= Murder of George E. Bailey =

1900 murder in Saugus, Massachusetts

Coordinates: 42.489°N 71.040°W

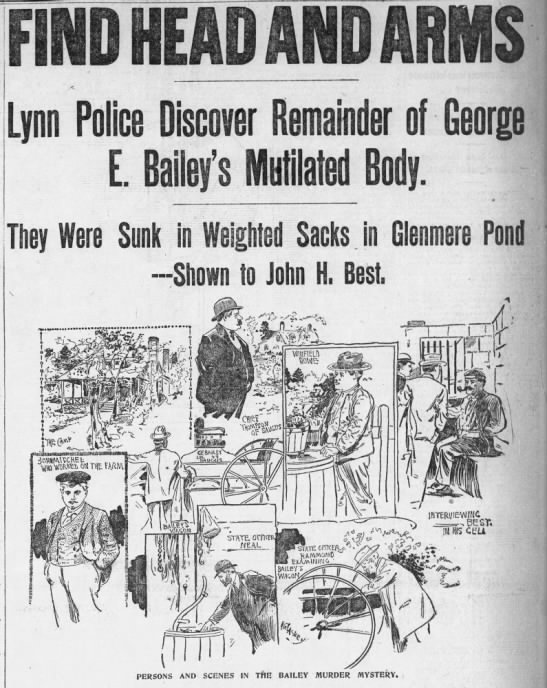
Drawing on the front page of The Boston Globe on October 19, 1900

The murder of George E. Bailey occurred on October 8, 1900, at Breakheart Hill Farm in Saugus, Massachusetts. Bailey's employee, John C. Best, was subsequently convicted of the murder and executed.

== George E. Bailey ==
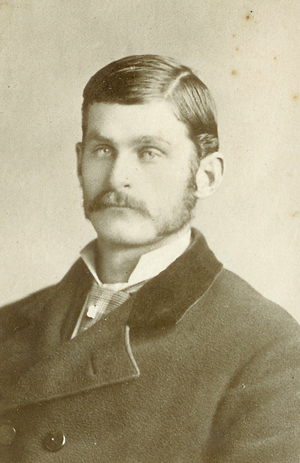
Bailey

Bailey was born in Whitefield, Maine. He married a woman in Lynn, Massachusetts, and the couple moved to Alna, Maine. They had two children before her death. Bailey later married Abbie Hilton of Wiscasset, Maine. They lived in Wiscasset, where Bailey worked as a blacksmith. The couple had four children together.

In the spring of 1897, Bailey abandoned his family and ran off with Susie Young, his wife's half-sister. Abbie Bailey was unable to support herself and the family's six children. They were placed with families in Whitefield and Wiscasset and she eventually found employment as a housekeeper.

Bailey and Young initially resided at the home of Henry O. Mitchell in Saugus, but the couple moved in October 1897 when Bailey leased Breakheart Hill Farm, an eighteen-acre (7 hectare) farm located on the three-hundred-acre (120 ha) Breakheart Hill Forest, from the Breakheart Hill Forestry, an association of wealthy businessmen from Lynn. Bailey was also hired to take care of their hunting camps at Breakheart Hill Forest for 20¢ per hour. About a year after moving into Breakheart Hill, Young gave birth to Bailey's child, a son.

== John C. Best ==
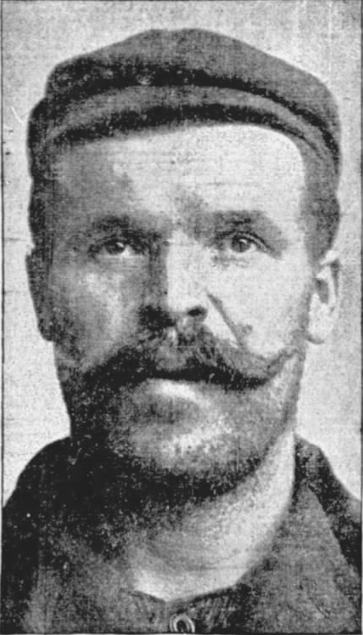
Best

John Courtney Best was born on April 8, 1865, in Sackville, New Brunswick. He was one of nine children. Best attended school full-time until about the age of twelve, when he moved in with an uncle. He then attended school during the winter and worked on the farm the rest of the year until the age of fifteen. During his youth, Best also became an award-winning marksman.

For ten years Best worked on the farm of A. Alfred Ayer, a friend of his father. After that he worked in Sackville at a shoe factory for about a year, at a grocery store for about four months, and at a hotel until he left for Massachusetts.

In 1891, Best's sister, Nettie Stiles, returned to Sackville from her home in Lynn, Massachusetts, for a visit. She requested that Best accompany her on her trip back. He remained with her in Lynn and found employment at J. B. Renton, a heel manufacturer.

In September 1898, Best was arrested for assault and sentenced to serve four months in the Salem House of Correction. Upon his release he returned to Lynn and worked for another heel manufacturer, J. G. Brown. He later returned to J. B. Renton where he remained until the company's employees went on strike.

During the strike, Best was hired by Bailey to work at Breakheart Hill for one month. He returned to heel manufacturing, but in May 1900 he returned to Breakheart to work full time. Best agreed to do half of the cultivating on the farm in exchange for a room to sleep in and half of the profits from the crops.

== Relationship between Bailey and Best ==
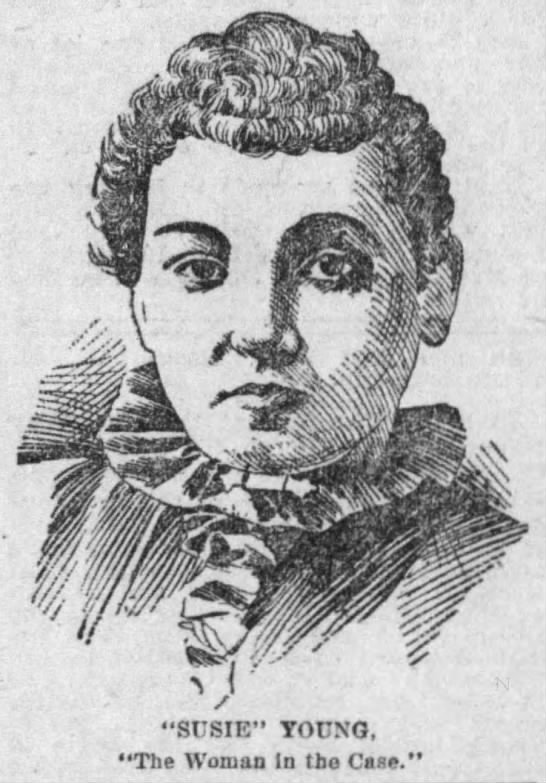
Young

Bailey, Young, and Best appeared to live harmoniously at Breakheart Hill, however Best and Bailey complained about each other outside of the farm. Best complained that Bailey was cruel to the animals and did not pay him all that he was entitled to. Bailey complained that Best was lazy and had a drinking problem. Bailey would withhold Best's pay until after the crops were sold to keep him from drinking away all of his share. Bailey would also give him less than he requested for farm equipment because Best tended to spend any money he had on him at the saloon.

Susie Young described Best as a harsh man who would go on a drinking binge for one or two weeks at a time. When he was drunk, she stated that Best would act crazily and once said while intoxicated that he would just as soon kill a man as not. However, she also said that she had only once seen Best and Bailey argue.

== Disappearance of George E. Bailey ==
On September 27, 1900, Young left Breakheart Hill to visit her sick mother in Wiscasset. She took her son with her. Bailey did not accompany her as he felt he could never return to Wiscasset due to the circumstances of his departure. Thus, Bailey and Best were alone at Breakheart Hill.

Between 9:30 and 9:40 pm on October 8, two gunshots were heard in the area of Breakheart Hill Farm. Around 10 pm, Hannah Hawkes, an elderly woman who lived at the end of the road leading to Breakheart Hill Farm, heard a carriage driving rapidly away from the farm. Later that night, she was awakened by the sound of a carriage driving up the road to the farm. Around 1:30 am, Ora Beede, a woman who resided near Floating Bridge Pond (also known as Glenmere Pond) in Lynn, heard the rattle of a wagon and saw a democrat wagon (Note: A light flatbed farm wagon or ranch wagon that has two or more seats and is usually drawn by one or sometimes two horses.) pass her home. She heard the sound of the horse's hooves on the planks of the bridge until the wagon reached about the halfway point of the bridge. After five minutes of silence, she heard the horse being driven back over the bridge and heard the wagon pass her house again. The wagon had a particular sound, as if one of its wheels was loose.

The next day, Best went to the homes of his neighbors, Sarah Rowe, Simon McKenna, and Annie Dwyer, to ask if they had seen Bailey. He told them that he had not seen Bailey since 8 o'clock the previous evening. Also that day, James W. Thomas noticed a bonfire in the yard at Breakheart Hill Farm. Among the items being burned was what Thomas took to be a piece of horse blanket. Johnnie Mitchell and Win Rowe, two area boys who assisted on the farm from time to time, both noticed the absence of two horse blankets. Investigators believed that Best dismembered Bailey's body on top of these blankets. Rowe also noticed that one of the farm's axes was missing.

Although no formal report was filed, word about Bailey's disappearance spread. Micajah Clough, one of the owners of the property, heard of Bailey's disappearance and that Best was constantly drunk and left the livestock unattended. He went to the farm to talk with Best, who told him that he thought Bailey had left because he was fleeing officers from Maine and that there was a $500 bounty on him for running out on his wife.

== Discovery of the body ==
On October 17, the trunk of a man's body was found in a bag at Floating Bridge Pond. There were two bullet holes in the breast of the body. Police believed that the body was Bailey's and visited Breakheart. They asked Best to come identify the body, however before they left he pulled out a half-full pint of whiskey and downed it. Best identified the clothing on the body as belonging to Bailey. Later that afternoon, the legs were found. Saugus Police Chief Charles O. Thompson corroborated Best's identification of the body parts, stating that the height, color of hair on the body, and shoe size matched that of Bailey. Shoemaker Darius W. Brewer also identified the shoes on the body as belonging to Bailey. Found on the body was a small chamois watch bag which Young would later identify as the one she made for Bailey.

The bags containing Bailey's body were labeled "I. H. Estes & Sons, Hay & Grain", the name of Bailey's grain supplier. A number of similar bags would be found on Breakheart Hill Farm.

== Investigation ==
The investigation was led by George C. Neal of the Massachusetts State Police. Officers from the Lynn and Saugus police departments were involved as well.

After the body was identified, police asked Best if they could search the house. Best said yes and provided them with lanterns. One of the two bullets found in the body fit inside of the barrel of a rifle found at the farmhouse. Examination of the weapon showed that it had fired recently. Best claimed that it had gone off accidentally about a week earlier. An examination of the house revealed blood stains on the carpet, wallpaper, and window sill of Best's bedroom, which Best claimed had been there ever since he moved in. After the search, Best was placed in custody for suspicion of murder. The next day, the police returned to the property and noticed that several stones had been removed from a wall on the property. These stones were of the same color and geological composition as the ones used to weigh down the bags containing Bailey's body.

Also on October 18, medical examiner Dr. Joseph G. Pinkham said that based on the body's stomach contents, he believed that the murder was committed on the night of October 8. Also, due to the trajectory of the bullets, the murderer held the gun at a 45 degree angle and was standing above Bailey when the shots were fired. Bailey may have been sitting down when he was killed. Due to the fact that Bailey bled internally after he was shot, it was possible that there would be no traces of blood where Bailey was shot. However, the area where his legs, head, and arms were cut off would be completely saturated. Therefore, police focused their efforts on finding the location where Bailey was mutilated instead of where he was shot.

A Saugus police officer found an empty .38 caliber cartridge in the ground below a small barn window. This, along with Pinkham's findings, led investigators to believe that Bailey was shot as he was seated in his democrat wagon as he drew rein in front of the barn door. Later, police discovered Bailey's overcoat hanging on a nail in his bedroom, which led them to change their theory to Bailey being shot as he was seated in his kitchen or sitting room. Young told police that after his day's work, Bailey would rest with his elbows on his knees and his head slumped way over due to his height. This would explain the trajectory of the bullets. However, by the time the case went to trial, the theory had changed again. During his opening statements, District Attorney W. Scott Peters stated that Best had shot Bailey as he climbed up the barn cellar stairs.

On October 22, Young returned from Maine to look over the house with detectives. She told them that the stains on the floor and the wallpaper in the storeroom were not there when she left, and that it appeared that someone had scrubbed the floor recently. This is where police believed Bailey's body was dismembered.

== Pre-trial ==
On January 25, 1901, Best was indicted for the murder of George E. Bailey. On January 30 he was arraigned and pleaded not guilty. Jury selection occurred on the morning of March 18.

== Trial ==
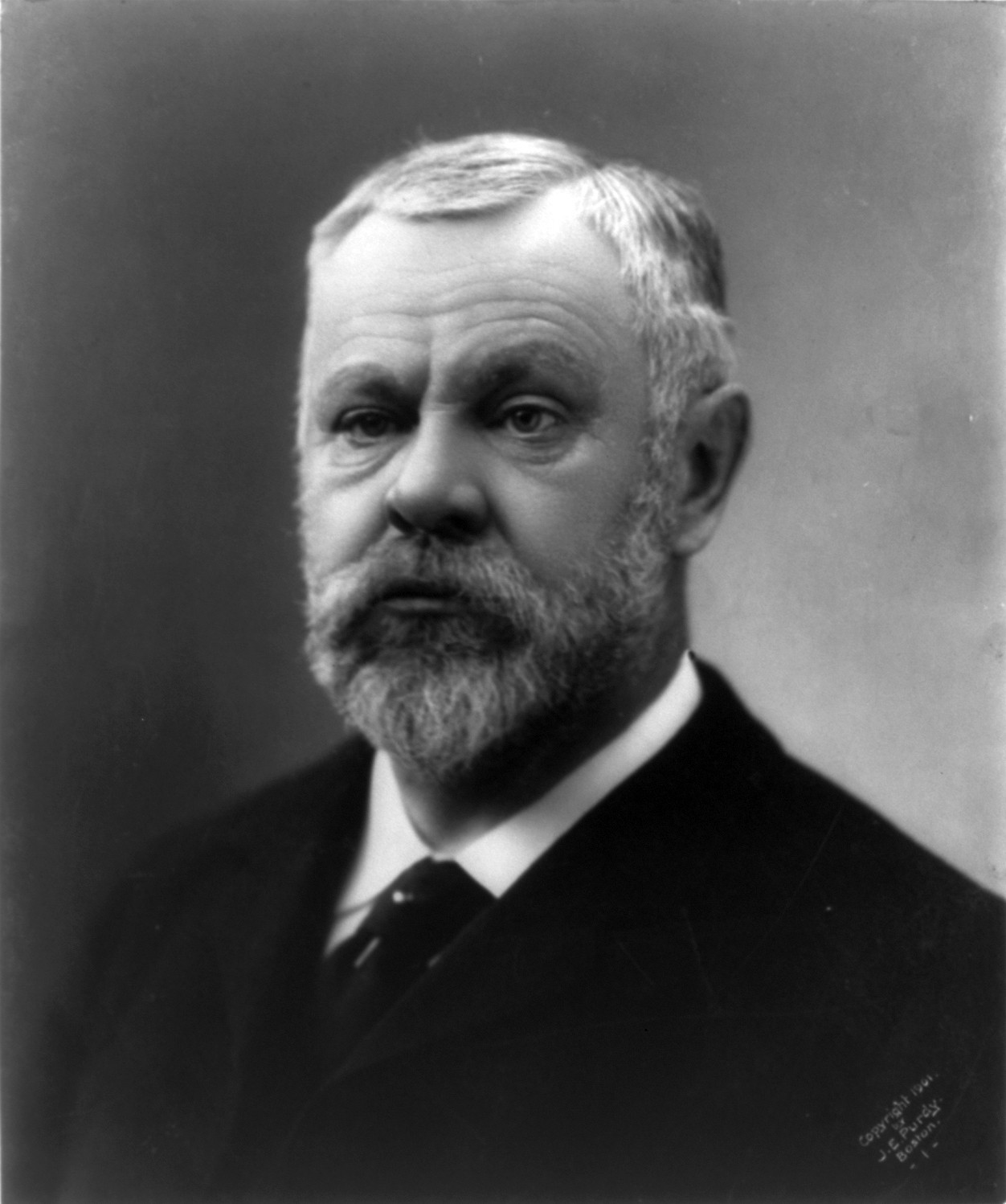
Massachusetts Attorney General Hosea M. Knowlton was one of the prosecutors on the case.

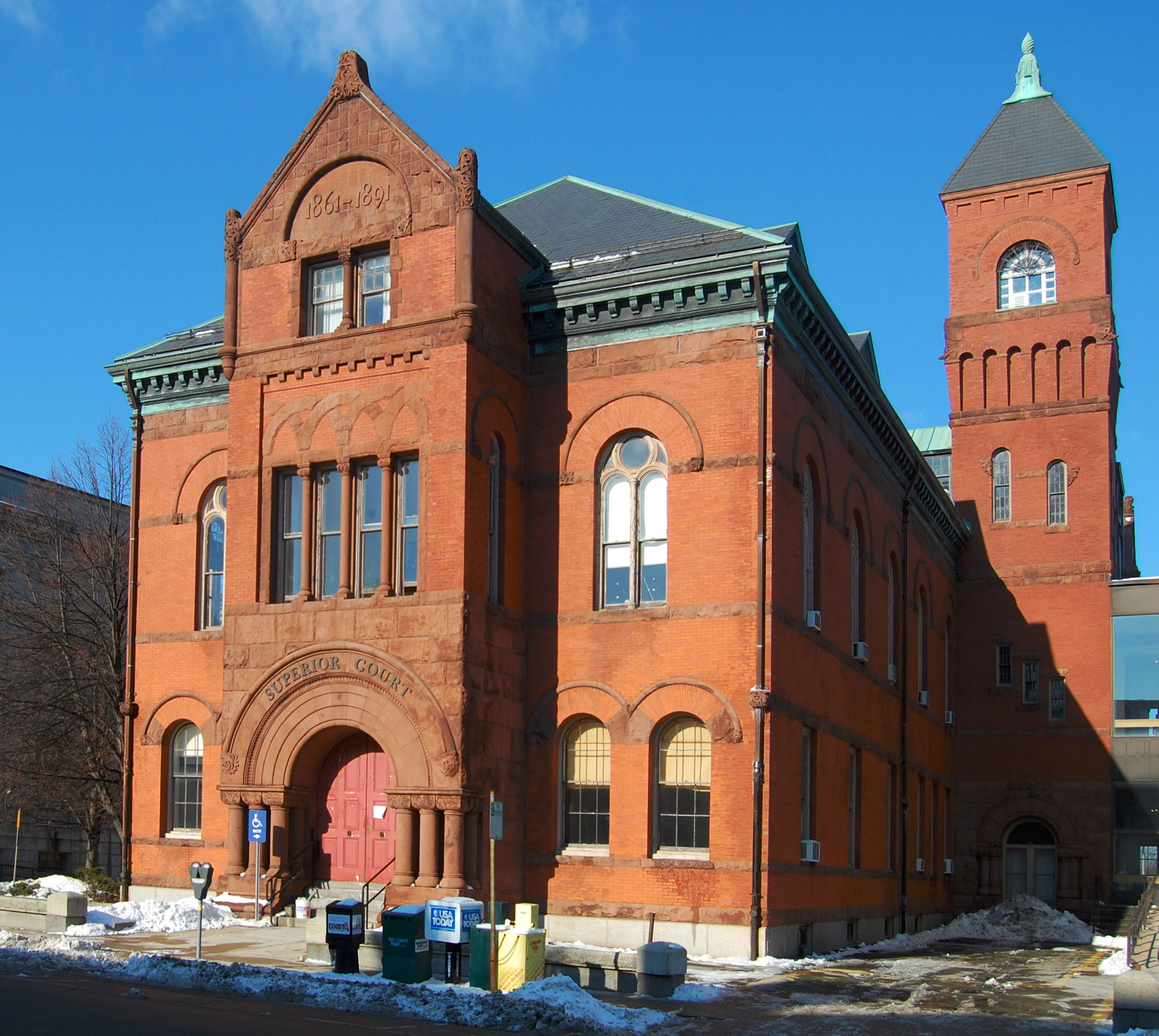
Best was tried in Massachusetts Superior Court in Salem, Massachusetts

Best's prosecutors were Massachusetts Attorney General Hosea M. Knowlton, Essex County District Attorney W. Scott Peters, and Assistant District Attorney Roland H. Sherman. James H. Sisk and Nathan D. A. Clarke were appointed by the court to represent him. Massachusetts Superior Court Justices Jabez Fox and Edgar J. Sherman presided over the trial.

The trial began on the afternoon of March 18. On the fifth day of the trial, William H. Stiles, Best's brother-in-law, revealed that Best had told him that some property, including a watch, was hidden in the basement of the barn. Best wanted Stiles to go to the barn and take the watch and "fling it away as far as [he] could at low water mark". Although Best did not say whose watch it was, he told his brother-in-law "if that watch is found, I am lost".

After the revelation, police hurried to Breakheart Hill farm. Hidden over a rafter was a package made up in newspaper. It contained a gold watch, $75 in cash, a pocket knife, and part of a leather coat that resembled the one Bailey was wearing the day he was killed. Oakes M. Palmer, a watchmaker from Pittston, Maine, testified that the serial number on the watch matched that of a watch Bailey had him repair twice in 1891. Best claimed that he had taken these items after Bailey disappeared, because Bailey owed him money and he wanted to secure himself.

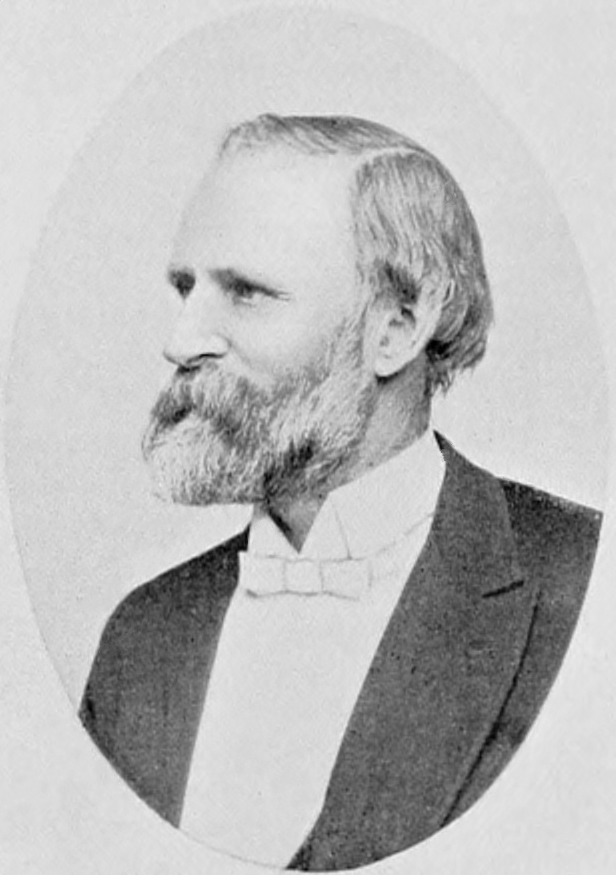
Massachusetts Superior Court Justice Edgar J. Sherman was one of two justices who presided over the case.

The trial concluded on March 28. After six hours of deliberation, the jury returned a verdict of murder in the first degree.

== Appeals ==
Exceptions filed by the defense during the trial were argued before the Massachusetts Supreme Judicial Court on January 6, 1902. The exceptions were overruled on February 27.

On March 13, Best's attorneys requested that the verdict be set aside and that he be given a new trial on the grounds that the verdict was against the evidence and that one of the jurors was unqualified to serve due to deafness. On March 15, the motion was overruled by Sherman and Fox.

On August 6, Governor Winthrop M. Crane and the Executive Council heard Best's plea for commutation of his sentence. His request was rejected.

== Sentencing ==
On June 14, 1902, Best was sentenced to death in the electric chair. His execution was to take place on the week of September 7, 1902, at the Charlestown State Prison. Best was the first prisoner in Essex County, Massachusetts, to be sentenced to the electric chair.

== Execution ==
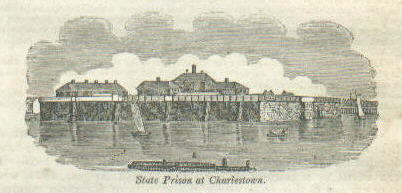
Best was executed by electric chair on September 9, 1902 at Charlestown State Prison.

On August 28, 1902, Best was transported from the Salem jail to Charlestown State Prison. He was executed at 12:22 am on September 9. He was completely composed during his execution and did not utter any final words. The witnesses were prison physician Dr. Joseph McLaughlin, Surgeon General of Massachusetts Robert A. Blood, associate district medical examiner Dr. George Stedman, and Deputy Sheriff William Cronin, whose presence was required by law. Rev. I. Murray Mellish and a representative from the Associated Press were also in attendance. He was pronounced dead by the attending physicians at 12:27 am.

== Aftermath ==
On October 23, 1900, Bailey's body was transported from Boston to Richmond, Maine, by boat. It was then taken to Whitefield for burial. After the trial, Young returned to Wiscasset.

William H. Stiles was persecuted and ostracized in his hometown of Lynn. He was called a "Judas", "traitor", and "informer" for testifying against his brother-in-law. His ten-year-old son was verbally and physically attacked at school. District Attorney Peters wrote a letter to the Lynn Police Department suggesting that they give the Stiles family protection.

Best's father expected that his son's body would be returned to Sackville for burial, but it was instead interred at the Concord Reformatory Cemetery in Concord, Massachusetts. On September 20, a letter Best wrote to his parents shortly before his execution was made public. In it he wrote of the status of his personal affairs, expressed his innocence, and requested that his burial be paid for by the state.

Bailey was succeeded as caretaker of Breakheart Hill by Henry Cole. On April 12, 1901, Cole left home and was never seen again. Cole took some money with him and sold a horse prior to his departure. He and his wife had an argument before he left and she believed that he had not returned because he had tired of his family situation.

In 1934, the Breakheart Hill property was sold to the Metropolitan District Commission, which turned it into a state park known as Breakheart Reservation. The farmhouse was later destroyed by a fire.
