= John W. Coughlin =

American politician (1861–1920)

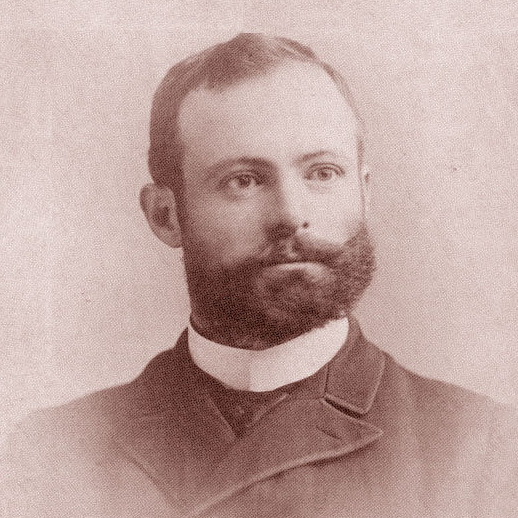

Mayor of Fall River, Massachusetts
- In office 1891–1894
- Preceded by: James Frederick Jackson
- Succeeded by: William S. Greene

Personal details
- Born: June 9, 1861 Fall River, Massachusetts, U.S.
- Died: December 2, 1920 (aged 59) Fall River, Massachusetts, U.S.
- Party: Democratic
- Relations: John T. Coughlin (cousin)
- Education: College of Physicians and Surgeons, Baltimore Maryland
- Profession: Medical Doctor

John W. Coughlin (June 9, 1861 – December 2, 1920) was an American physician and politician who served as Mayor of Fall River, Massachusetts.

Coughlin was born in Fall River on June 9, 1861, to William and Abbie Coughlin. He studied medicine at the College of Physicians and Surgeons in Baltimore, Maryland.

Coughlin was elected Mayor of Fall River in 1890. He represented Massachusetts' thirteenth Congressional District at the 1892 Democratic National Convention. He was the Democratic Party nominee for Lieutenant Governor of Massachusetts in 1901, but lost to Republican John L. Bates 183,249 votes to 111,248.

Coughlin died in Fall River on December 2, 1920.

== Notes ==
Political offices
Preceded by James Frederick Jackson	Mayor of Fall River, Massachusetts; 1891 – 1894	Succeeded by William S. Greene
Party political offices
Preceded by John B. O'Donnell	Democratic nominee for Lieutenant Governor of Massachusetts; 1901	Succeeded by Herbert C. Joyner
Preceded by William A. Gaston	Democratic National Committeeman from Massachusetts; 1905–1920	Succeeded by Edward W. Quinn
