= Sue K. Brown =

American diplomat (1948–2024)

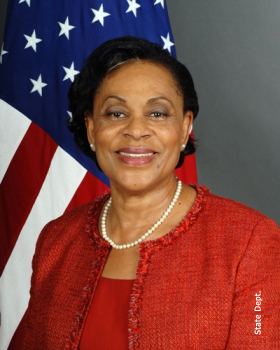

United States Ambassador to Montenegro
- In office May 12, 2011 – February 11, 2015
- President: Barack Obama
- Preceded by: Roderick W. Moore
- Succeeded by: Margaret A. Uyehara

Personal details
- Born: August 19, 1948 Houston, Texas, U.S.
- Died: May 14, 2024 (aged 75) Arlington, Virginia, U.S.

Sue Katherine Brown (August 19, 1948 – May 14, 2024) was an American Foreign Service officer who served as U.S. Ambassador to Montenegro from 2011 to 2015. She also served as chargé d'affaires in Ghana. She retired from the Foreign Service in 2015. She was the first African-American to hold the post.

While ambassador, Brown coordinated American assistance twice following natural disasters. Both times she arranged for needed services after record snowfalls including food, fuel and medical attention.

Brown died at her home in Arlington, Virginia, on May 14, 2024, at the age of 75.

Diplomatic posts
Preceded by Roderick W. Moore	United States Ambassador to Montenegro; 2011–2015	Succeeded by Margaret A. Uyehara
