= George C. Neal =

- Born: September 17, 1842; Sandwich, New Hampshire
- Died: December 14, 1929 (aged 87); Lynn, Massachusetts
- Title: Massachusetts State Fire Marshal
- Term: 1919-1929

George C. Neal (September 17, 1842 – December 14, 1929) was an American law enforcement official who was Massachusetts Fire Marshal from 1904 to 1929.

== Early life ==
Neal was born on September 17, 1842, in Sandwich, New Hampshire. He was raised in Gilmanton, New Hampshire and began working at a local shoe factory at the age of 14. In 1859, he moved to Massachusetts and worked at a shoe factory in Stoneham, Massachusetts. He served in the 33rd Massachusetts Infantry Regiment during the American Civil War.

== Lynn, Massachusetts ==
After the War, Neal settled in Lynn, Massachusetts and resumed his work as a shoemaker. He became an officer in the Order of the Knights of St. Crispin, a powerful labor union of shoe workers. He opposed the 1878 Crispin's strike. The strike led to the collapse of the union.

Neal was a longtime member of the Lynn Common Council and was its president in 1882, 1883, and 1884. In 1886 and 1887, he was city marshal and launched a crackdown on illegal liquor. In 1894, he was appointed deputy city marshal.

== Massachusetts State Police ==
In 1894, Neal was appointed to the Massachusetts State Police by Governor Frederic T. Greenhalge. He was the detective in charge of the southern part of Essex County, Massachusetts. In 1894, he was found guilty of assaulting the wife of a man he was arrested and fined $12. In 1900, he led the investigation into the murder of George E. Bailey.

Following the death of Rufus R. Wade, it was reported that Neal sought to succeed him as head of the state police. On February 24, 1904, Governor John L. Bates appointed deputy chief Joseph E. Shaw to succeed Wade and Neal to succeed Shaw. That April, he led the search of Charles L. Tucker's residence following his arrest for the murder of Mabel Page. In 1908, he investigated the murder of Annie Mullins. In 1915, he investigated allegations against state supervisor of small loans E. Gerry Brown. After Brown was removed from office, Governor David I. Walsh appointed Neal as Brown's temporary replacement. Neal continued to look into the allegations against Brown and found that he had acted in good faith and had not violated any law.

Neal led the state police during the illness of chief Jophanus Whitney and served as acting chief following his death in 1915. In this role, he forbade The Birth of a Nation from being shown on Sundays, as he deemed the film not suitable for a Sunday showing. At the time, the state police had to approve all movies presented on Sundays. In 1916, Governor Walsh promoted John H. Plunkett to chief of the state police instead Neal due to Neal's advanced age (74).

== State fire marshal ==
In 1904, the state fire marshal's department was abolished and its powers and duties were transferred to the state police under Neal's direction. He served concurrently as deputy chief of the state police and state fire marshal until 1919, when the positions were separated and Neal was appointed by Governor Calvin Coolidge to lead the state fire marshal's department.

In 1913, Neal enacted new regulations for keeping, selling, and using fireworks. He also worked on restricting the sale of dynamite, which had been sold in stores without regulation. In 1913, he investigated the Arcadia Hotel fire and found no evidence of arson. He led the inquiry into the cause of the Great Salem fire of 1914. In 1915, he took part in the investigation into the cause of the St. John's School fire. Neal found that the fire had started in a refuse closet and elimated the boiler and electrical wiring as the cause of the fire. He was unable to find a cause for the fire, which caused the death of 21 students. In 1919, he led the state's investigation into the cause of the explosion the resulted in the Great Molasses Flood. In 1928, he investigated the explosion at the Beacon Oil Company refinery in Everett, Massachusetts. He found the cause of the explosion and fire was a weakness in the tank or carelessness by a person or persons.

In 1926, it was expected that Governor Alvan T. Fuller would not reappoint Neal due to his older age. However, Neal was widely seen as competent and energetic, and Fuller chose to give him another three-year term. During his later years as fire marshal Neal played a prominent role in licensing garages, campaigning against fire hazards, and promoting reforms for explosive storage in factories. He died on December 14, 1929, at his home in Lynn.
