= 1896 Massachusetts gubernatorial election =

- November 3, 1896
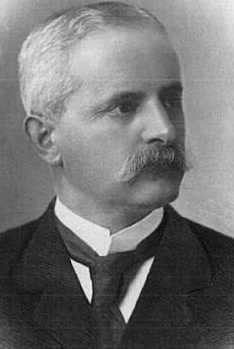

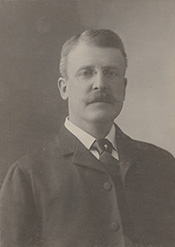
Nominee	Roger Wolcott	George Fred Williams
Party	Republican	Democratic
Alliance		Populist; Independent
Popular vote	258,204	103,662
Percentage	67.06%	26.92%
- Wolcott: 40–50% 50–60% 60–70% 70–80% 80–90% >90% Williams: 40–50% 50–60%
Governor before election
Roger Wolcott (acting)
Republican
Elected Governor
Roger Wolcott
Republican

The 1896 Massachusetts gubernatorial election was held on November 3, 1896. Acting Governor Roger Wolcott, a Republican, was elected to a full term in office, defeating Democratic U.S. Representative George Fred Williams.

== General election ==
=== Candidates ===
- Thomas C. Brophy (Socialist Labor)
- Allen Coffin (Prohibition)
- Frederick O. Prince, former mayor of Boston (National Democratic)
- George F. Williams, former U.S. representative from Dedham and Democratic nominee for governor in 1895 (Democratic, Populist, and Independent)
- Roger Wolcott, lieutenant governor since 1893 (Republican)

=== Results ===
1896 Massachusetts gubernatorial election
Party	Candidate	Votes	%	±%
Republican	Roger Wolcott (incumbent)	256,204	67.06%	▲10.29
Democratic	George Fred Williams	93,934	24.39%	▼12.67
Populist	George Fred Williams	5,907	1.53%	▼0.84
Independent	George Fred Williams	3,821	0.99%	N/A
Total	George Fred Williams	103,662	26.92%	▼10.14
National Democratic	Frederick O. Prince	14,164	3.68%	N/A
Socialist Labor	Thomas C. Brophy	4,548	1.18%	▲0.19
Prohibition	Allen Coffin	4,472	1.16%	▼1.64
Write-in	All others	14	0.00%	▲0.02
Total votes		385,064	100.00%	

== See also ==
- 1896 Massachusetts legislature
