= Judy Rising Reinke =

American diplomat

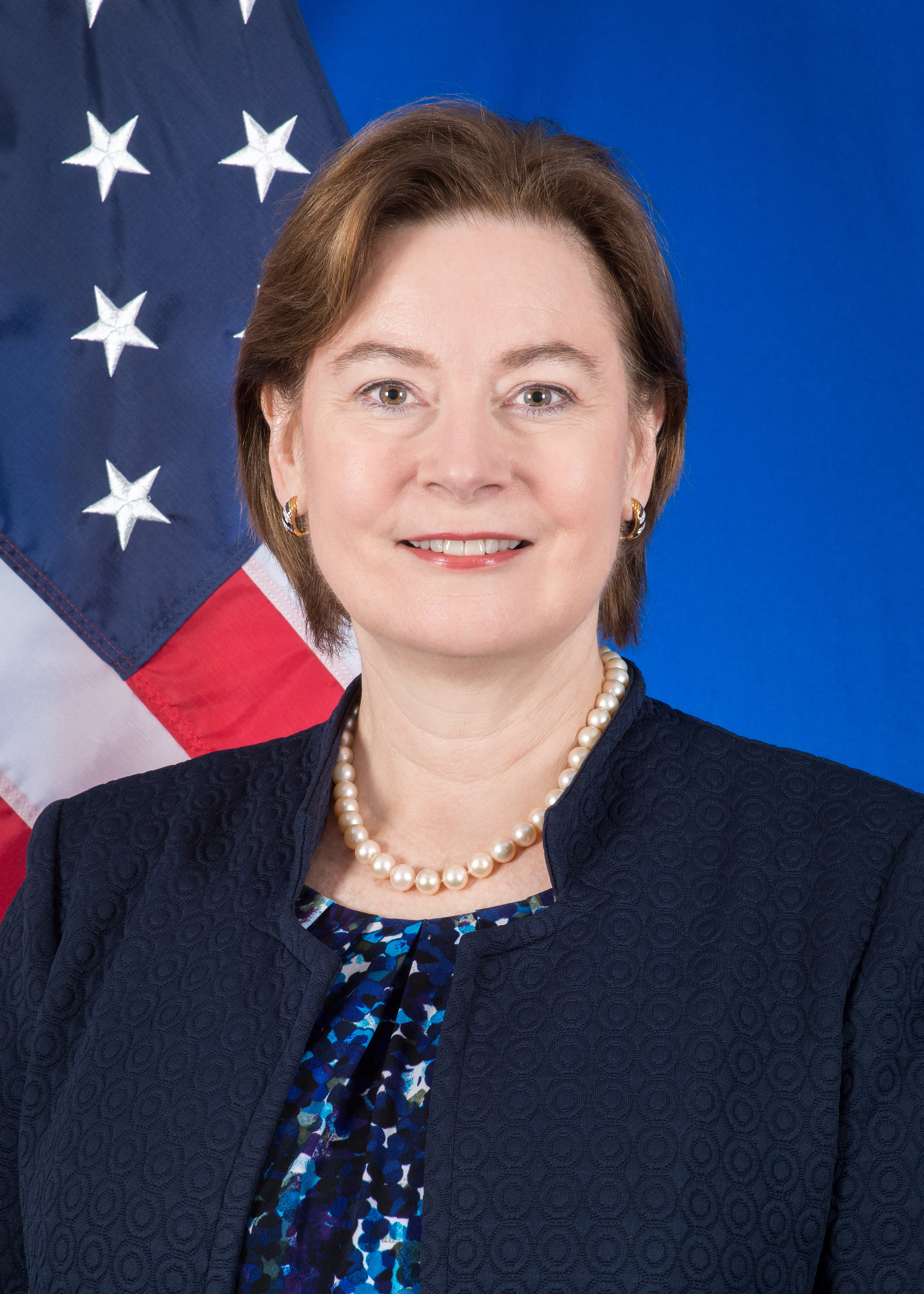
- Official portrait, 2018

United States Ambassador to Montenegro
- In office December 20, 2018 – January 16, 2026
- President: Donald Trump; Joe Biden; Donald Trump
- Preceded by: Margaret A. Uyehara

Personal details
- Born: Judy Jeanne Rising
- Spouse: Edwin Reinke
- Children: 1
- Education: Smith College (B.A.); Princeton University (M.P.A.)

Judy Rising Reinke is an American diplomat who had served the United States Ambassador to Montenegro.

== Education ==
Reinke received a Bachelor of Arts degree from Smith College and a Master of Public Affairs from the Woodrow Wilson School at Princeton University in 1983.

== Career ==
Reinke is a career member of the Foreign Commercial Service. She has been working as a strategist and advocate for the Commerce Department since 1983. She worked on missions across the world, primarily in Europe and Southeast Asia. She has served at multiple capacities including being the Deputy Director General of the United States and Foreign Commercial Service/Global Markets division. She has served at six United States Missions overseas, including leading the operations of the Foreign Commercial Service in India, the Philippines, and Thailand. She holds the rank of Career Minister in the Foreign Commercial Service.

=== United States Ambassador to Montenegro ===
On July 27, 2018, President Trump nominated Reinke to be the next United States Ambassador to Montenegro. On September 6, 2018, the Senate confirmed her nomination by voice vote. She presented her credentials to the President of Montenegro on December 20, 2018. Reinke is the first female foreign service officer from the Department of Commerce to be confirmed as Chief of Mission. In October, 2019, Reinke and the US Embassy hosted US Secretary of State Mike Pompeo, the first Secretary of State to visit Montenegro since its independence in 2006.

Following the death of former president Jimmy Carter on December 29, 2024, Reinke said on Twitter (now X), "I was honored to sign the Condolence Book for President Jimmy Carter to honor his lifelong dedication to the betterment of society. He was a great man and role model to everyone, especially to those of us working in public service. His unwavering commitment to peace, democracy, and human rights has left an indelible legacy. Thank you for everything you have done, and rest in peace, President Carter."

== Personal life ==
Reinke is married to Edwin Reinke and has a daughter. She speaks German, French, Bahasa Indonesia and Thai.

== See also ==
- List of ambassadors of the United States
- List of ambassadors appointed by Donald Trump

Diplomatic posts
Preceded by Margaret A. Uyehara	United States Ambassador to Montenegro; 2018–2026	Vacant
