= 1909 Massachusetts gubernatorial election =

- November 2, 1909
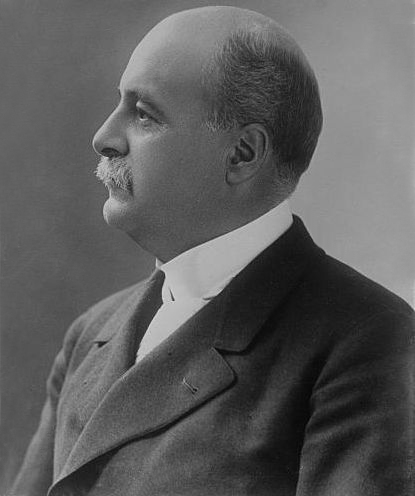

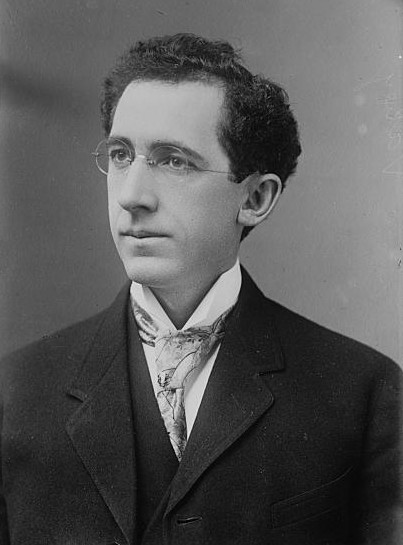
Nominee	Eben S. Draper	James H. Vahey
Party	Republican	Democratic
Popular vote	190,186	182,252
Percentage	48.64%	46.62%
- Draper: 40-50% 50–60% 60–70% 70–80% 80–90% >90% Vahey: 40-50% 50–60% 60–70%
Governor before election
Eben S. Draper
Republican
Elected Governor
Eben S. Draper
Republican

The 1909 Massachusetts gubernatorial election was held on November 2, 1909. Incumbent Governor Republican Eben S. Draper was re-elected, defeating Democratic nominee James H. Vahey with 48.64% of the vote.

== Republican nomination ==
=== Candidates ===
- Eben S. Draper, incumbent governor

=== Results ===
At the Republican state convention, held on October 2, Draper was re-nominated by acclamation.

== Democratic nomination ==
=== Candidates ===
- John T. Coughlin, mayor of Fall River
- James H. Vahey, former state senator and candidate for governor in 1908

=== Results ===
At the Democratic state convention, held on September 30 at Faneuil Hall, Vahey defeated Coughlin by 384 votes to 198.

== General election ==
=== Results ===
==== Governor ====
1909 Massachusetts gubernatorial election
Party	Candidate	Votes	%	±%
Republican	Eben S. Draper (incumbent)	190,186	48.64%	▼2.95
Democratic	James H. Vahey	182,252	46.61%	▲8.61
Socialist	Dan A. White	10,137	2.59%	▼0.67
Prohibition	John A. Nicholls	5,423	1.39%	▲0.04
Socialist Labor	Moritz E. Ruther	2,999	0.77%	▲0.19
Write-in	All others	16	0.00%	Steady
Total votes		391,013	100.00%	

==== Lieutenant governor ====
1909 Massachusetts lieutenant gubernatorial election
Party	Candidate	Votes	%	±%
Republican	Louis A. Frothingham	188,417	48.76%	▼7.86
Democratic	Eugene N. Foss	180,659	46.75%	▲12.82
Socialist	George G. Hall	10,362	2.68%	▼0.06
Prohibition	Ernest R. Knipe	4,088	1.06%	▼0.30
Socialist Labor	Lawrence Yates	2,924	0.76%	▲0.09
Write-in	All others	4	0.00%	Steady
Total votes		386,450	100.00%	

== See also ==
- 1909 Massachusetts legislature

== Bibliography ==
- Office of the Secretary of the Commonwealth (1910). Election Statistics, 1909. Boston, MA: Wright & Potter Printing Co., State Printers.
