= Beacon Oil explosion =

1928 fire in Everett, Massachusetts

- Date: February 10, 1928
- Time: 3 pm
- Location: Beacham Street Everett, Massachusetts; 42°23′45″N 71°03′30″W
- Deaths: 14
- Injuries: 36
- Property damage: $75,000 ($1.41 million in 2025)

The Beacon Oil explosion occurred on February 10, 1928, at the company's distilling plant in Everett, Massachusetts. 14 people were killed in 36 injured in the disaster.

== History ==
The Beacon Oil Company was founded in 1919 and began work on its Everett refinery soon after its formation. The Everett plant was located between Beacham Street and the Mystic River. It was neighbored by wooden tenements. It was owned by the Beacon Oil Company, which operated Colonial Filling Stations - the largest chain of independent gas stations in New England. The company began expanding around 1925, acquiring the gasoline and kerosene business of Pennzoil, the Consolidated Oil Company of Portland, Narragansett Filling Stations, and Balten Service Stations. By 1928 the plant had grown to 100 acres, despite opposition from Everett residents. The plant had been the scene of previous fires and explosions, including a 1922 explosion that killed employee Harry Vokes, a 1925 fire that required the evacuation of 200 people who lived nearby, and a 1926 fire that took six departments ten hours to put out.

== Explosion ==
At 3 pm, two small oil stills exploded, sending pieces of metal flying. These pieces punctured larger stills, which caused their oil to leak out and catch fire. A total of ten stills exploded, setting fire to over 500,000 gallons of oil. The explosions sent flames 200 feet in the air, shattered windows in nearby buildings, shook buildings within a ten-mile radius, and sent black smoke into the air that could be seen from 56 miles away.

Following the explosion, Beacon Oil employees rushed to the company's fire apparatus and an automatic fire alarm was sounded. At 3:05 pm a second alarm was sounded which brought an apparatus from the Chelsea fire department. A third alarm was sounded at 3:07 pm which brought an apparatus from Revere. A telephone call was also placed to the Boston Fire Department, which brought Chief Daniel Sennott and two of the department's engines to the scene. In addition to fire crews, a large police detail was brought in to manage the crowd, which numbered in the thousands. The department also sent all of the city's ambulances to the scene and received additional ambulances from Chelsea, Medford, Malden, the Metropolitan District Commission, and the Boston Police Department. Most of the injured were transported to Massachusetts General Hospital. Others were brought to hospitals in Everett, Chelsea, and Malden. Oliver Cope, a surgeon known for his work in burn treatment, got his first experience with burns by treating patients from the explosion at Mass General. Doctors and priests also rushed to the scene to attend to the wounded and deceased. Rescue efforts were hampered by the thick black smoke and gasses that filled the air.

14 men were killed and 36 were injured in the explosion.

== Cause ==
State fire marshal George C. Neal stated that the cause of the explosion and fire was a weakness in the tank or carelessness by a person or persons. Juries in two civil suits against Beacon Oil Company found that the explosion was not caused by negligence on the part of the company. The refinery remained open until 1965 when its owner, Standard Oil of New Jersey, closed it for being unprofitable.

== See also ==
- List of disasters in Massachusetts by death toll
