= 1897 Massachusetts gubernatorial election =

- November 2, 1897
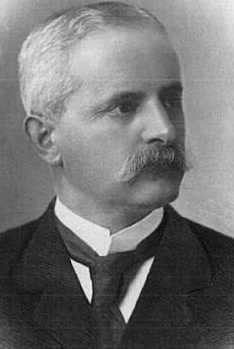

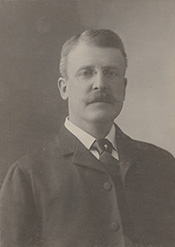

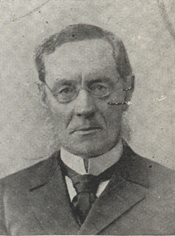
| Nominee | Roger Wolcott | George Fred Williams | William Everett |
| Party | Republican | Democratic | National Democratic |
| Popular vote | 165,095 | 79,552 | 13,897 |
| Percentage | 61.95% | 29.49% | 5.14% |
- Wolcott: 40–50% 50–60% 60–70% 70–80% 80–90% >90% Williams: 40–50% 50–60%
Governor before election
Roger Wolcott
Republican
Elected Governor
Roger Wolcott
Republican

The 1897 Massachusetts gubernatorial election was held on November 2, 1897. Incumbent governor Roger Wolcott was re-elected to a second term in office over George F. Williams, who was nominated for the third consecutive election.

== General election ==
=== Candidates ===
- John Bascom, former president of the University of Wisconsin (Prohibition)
- Thomas C. Brophy (Socialist Labor)
- William Everett, former U.S. representative from Quincy (Note: Although Everett was a resident of Quincy, he represented Massachusetts's 7th district, situated north of Boston.) (National Democratic)
- George Fred Williams, former U.S. representative from Dedham and Democratic nominee for governor in 1895 and 1896 (Democratic)
- Roger Wolcott, incumbent governor since January 1897 (Republican)

=== Results ===
1897 Massachusetts gubernatorial election
| Party | Candidate | Votes | % | ±% |
|---|---|---|---|---|
| Republican | Roger Wolcott (incumbent) | 165,095 | 61.95% | ▼5.11 |
| Democratic | George Fred Williams | 79,552 | 29.49% | ▲2.57 |
| National Democratic | William Everett | 13,897 | 5.14% | ▲1.46 |
| Socialist Labor | Thomas C. Brophy | 6,301 | 2.34% | ▲1.16 |
| Prohibition | John Bascom | 4,948 | 1.83% | ▲0.67 |
| Others | All others | 20 | 0.01% | ▲0.01 |
| Republican hold | | Swing | | |

== Lt. governor ==
1897 Massachusetts lieutenant gubernatorial election
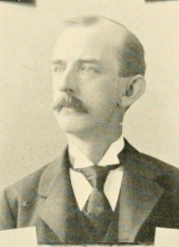
| Nominee | W. Murray Crane | Christopher T. Callahan | James E. Cotter |
| Party | Republican | Democratic | National Democratic |
| Popular vote | 157,106 | 77,003 | 16,202 |
| Percentage | 59.52% | 29.17% | 6.14% |
Lieutenant Governor before election
vacant
Elected Lieutenant Governor
W. Murray Crane
Republican

1897 Massachusetts lieutenant gubernatorial election
| Party | Candidate | Votes | % | ±% |
|---|---|---|---|---|
| Republican | W. Murray Crane | 157,106 | 59.52% | |
| Democratic | Christopher T. Callahan | 77,003 | 29.17% | |
| National Democratic | James E. Cotter | 16,202 | 6.14% | |
| Socialist Labor | Edward A. Buckland | 7,379 | 2.80% | |
| Prohibition | Willard O. Wylie | 4,948 | 2.37% | |
| Others | All others | 15 | 0.01% | |
| Republican hold | | Swing | | |

== See also ==
- 1897 Massachusetts legislature
