= List of ambassadors of the United States to Montenegro =

Ambassador of the United States to Montenegro
- Seal of the United States Department of State

- Flag of a United States ambassador

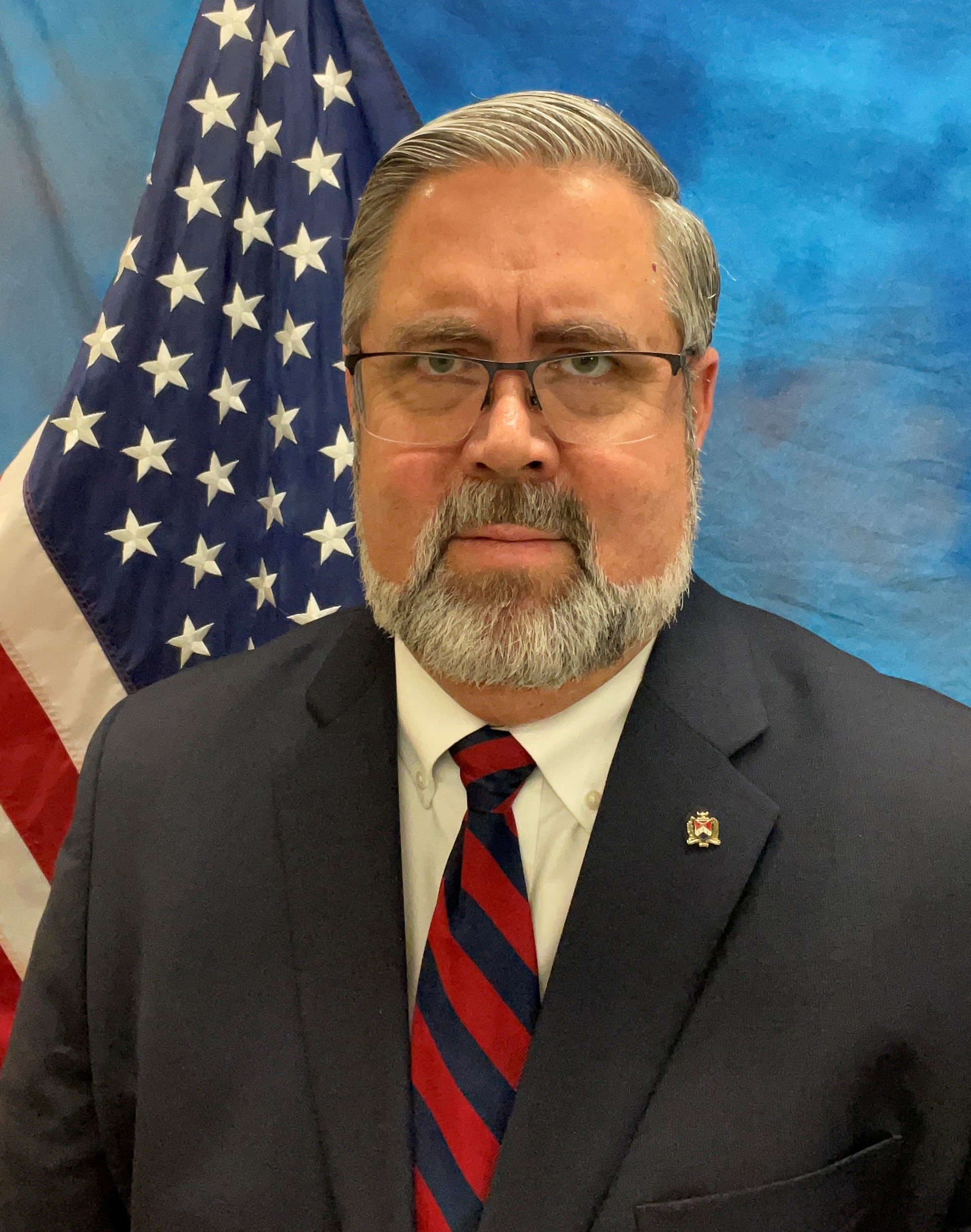
- Incumbent; Michael C. Keays; Chargé d'affaires since February 27, 2026
- Nominator: The president of the United States
- Appointer: The president with Senate advice and consent
- Inaugural holder: John Brinkerhoff Jackson as Minister Plenipotentiary to the Court of St. James's
- Formation: October 30, 1905
- Website: U.S. Embassy – Montenegro

This is a list of United States ambassadors to Montenegro.

- October 30, 1905–October 27, 1907 John Brinkerhoff Jackson, Resident at Athens
- May 20, 1908–June 29, 1909 Richmond Pearson, Resident at Athens
- May 31, 1910–September 30, 1912 George H. Moses, Resident at Athens
- July 21, 1913–August 18, 1913 Jacob Gould Schurman, Resident at Athens
- May 10, 1914–September 28, 1914 George Fred Williams, Resident at Athens
- November 1914–December 1918 Garrett Droppers, Resident at Athens; Montenegro absorbed into the Kingdom of the Serbs, Croats, and Slovenes on December 4, 1918
- 1918–1992 See United States Ambassador to Yugoslavia
- 1992–2006 See United States Ambassador to Serbia
- September 12, 2007–August 8, 2010 Roderick W. Moore
- April 27, 2011–February 11, 2015 Sue K. Brown
- February 19, 2015–July 24, 2018 Margaret A. Uyehara
- December 20, 2018–January 16, 2026 Judy Rising Reinke

== See also ==
- Montenegro – United States relations
- Foreign relations of Montenegro
- Ambassadors of the United States
