= Margaret A. Uyehara =

American diplomat

Margaret Uyehara
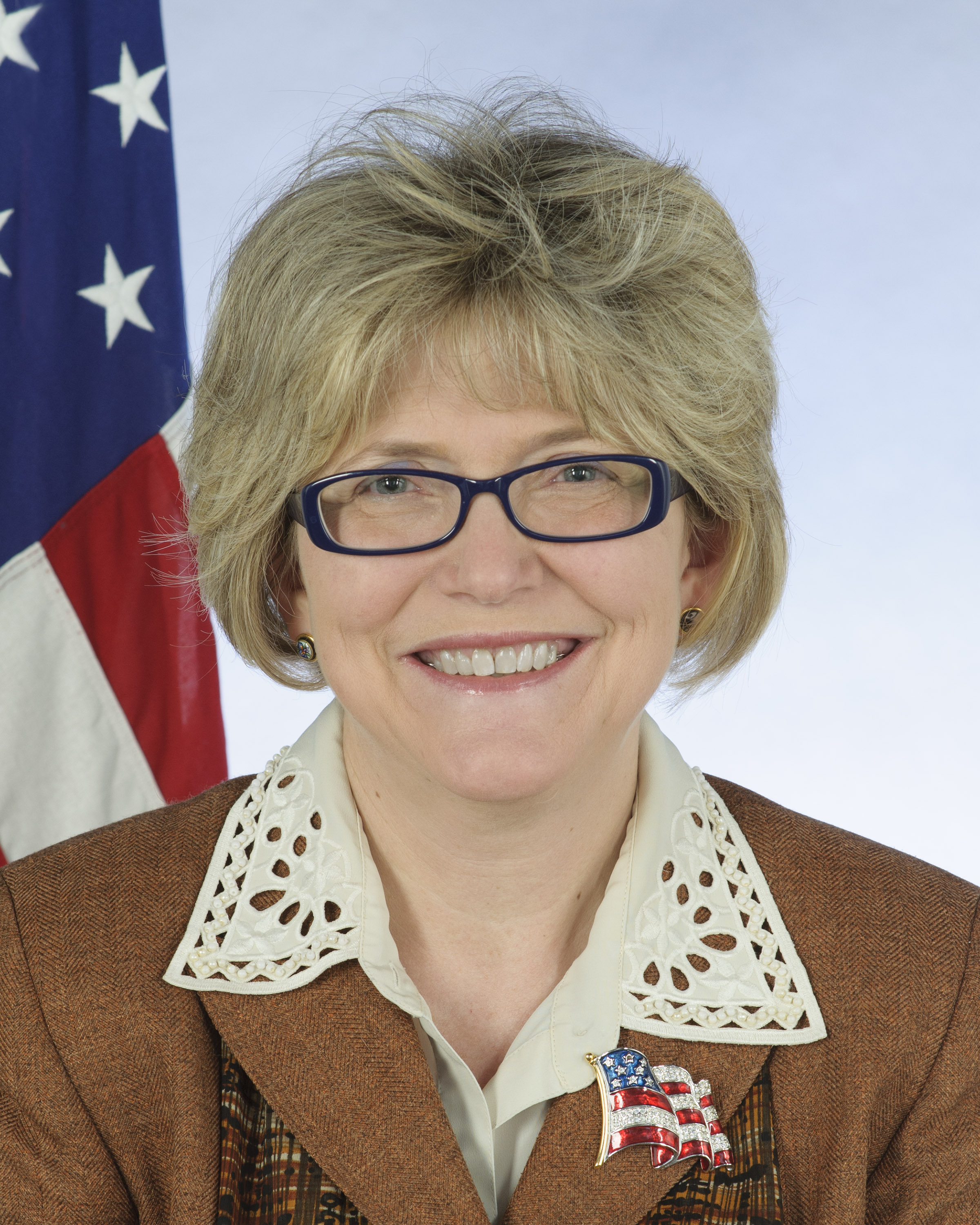

United States Ambassador to Montenegro
- In office February 19, 2015 – July 24, 2018
- President: Barack Obama; Donald Trump
- Preceded by: Sue K. Brown
- Succeeded by: Judy Rising Reinke

Personal details
- Born: 1958 (age 67–68) Berea, Ohio, U.S.
- Education: Kalamazoo College; Georgetown University

Margaret Ann Uyehara (born 1958) was an American diplomat whose last posting, prior to retirement, was as the United States Ambassador to Montenegro. She was nominated by President Barack Obama on July 9, 2014, and confirmed by the Senate in December 2014.

== Early life and education ==
Uyehara grew up in Berea, Ohio, the daughter of Kenneth E. Yohner and Peggy L. Bush Yohner. She was an undergraduate at Kalamazoo College in Michigan and graduated in 1981 with a Bachelor of Arts in political science. She later studied at the Edmund A. Walsh School of Foreign Service at Georgetown University.

== Career ==
After joining the Foreign Service, Uyehara served in Bamako, London, Manila, and Tokyo. She became liaison to the National Security Council for the 50th anniversary of the NATO summit. From 1999 to 2002, Uyehara was a supervisory general services officer at the U.S. embassy in Jakarta, Indonesia.

Uyehara was assigned in 2006 to Kyiv, Ukraine, as management counselor at the U.S. embassy. In 2008 she was named as director of the Regional Support Center at the U.S. Consulate in Frankfurt, Germany. In 2010 she became a management counselor in Vienna, Austria.

When she was nominated to become a U.S. ambassador, she was serving in Washington, D.C. as executive director of the Bureaus of European and Eurasian Affairs and International Organization Affairs.

== Personal life ==
Uyehara's husband, Michael, is also a Foreign Service Officer, they have three sons and two daughters. In addition to English, Uyehara speaks German, French, Ukrainian and Japanese.

== See also ==
- List of ambassadors of the United States

Diplomatic posts
Preceded by Sue Brown	United States Ambassador to Montenegro; 2015–2018	Succeeded by Judy Rising Reinke
