= Joshua Wolcott House =

Joshua Wolcott historical house

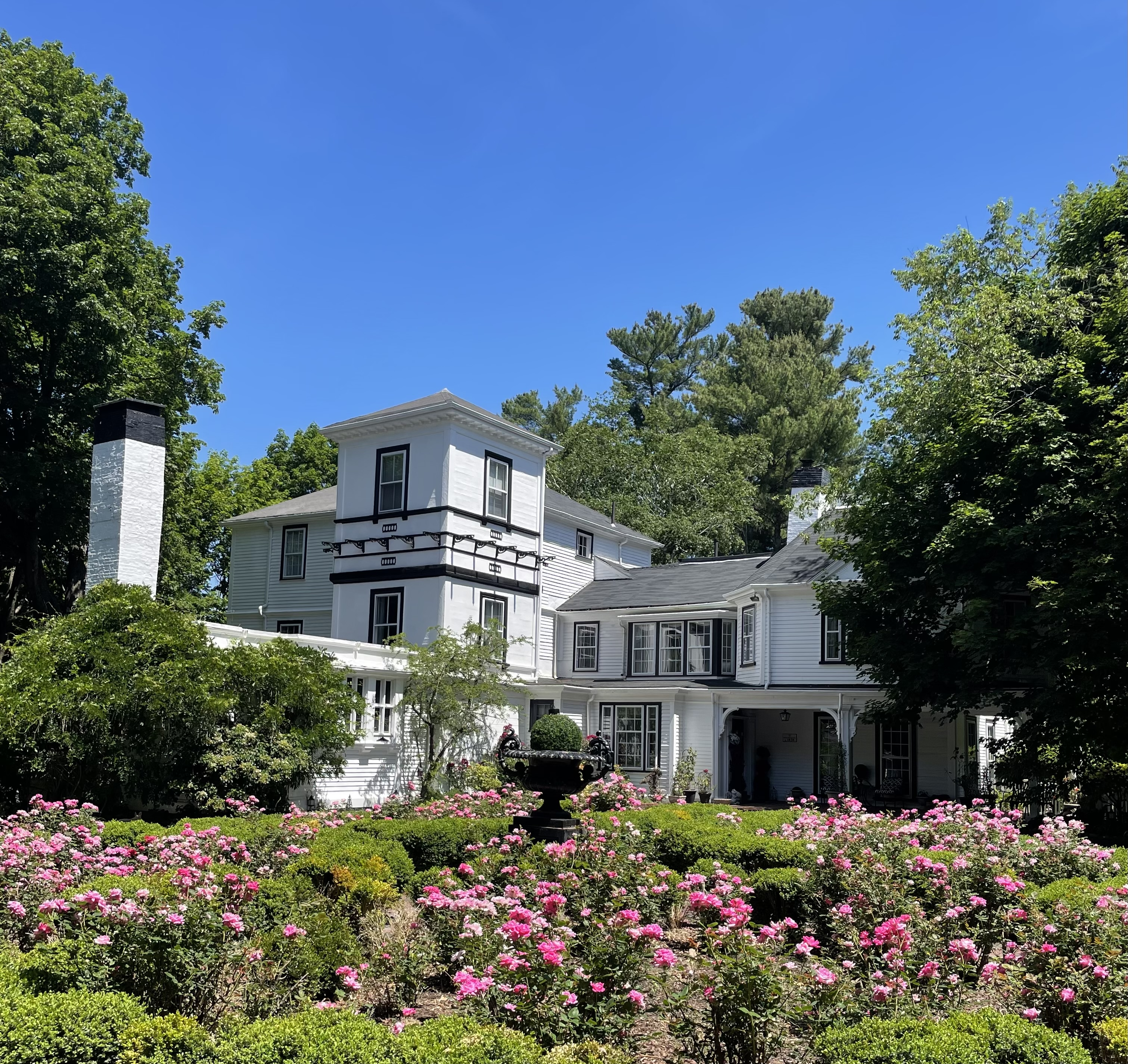
Joshua Wolcott House at 1733 Canton Avenue, Milton, MA

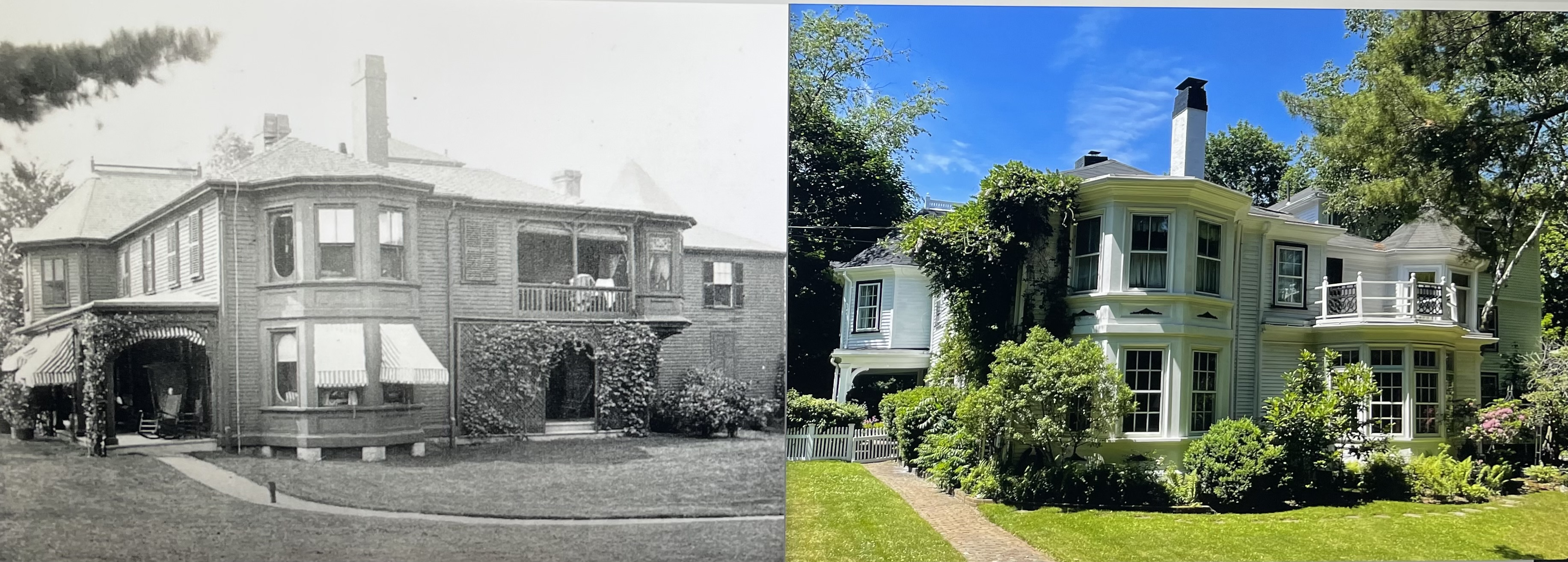
Preserved architectural facade, 1830-today

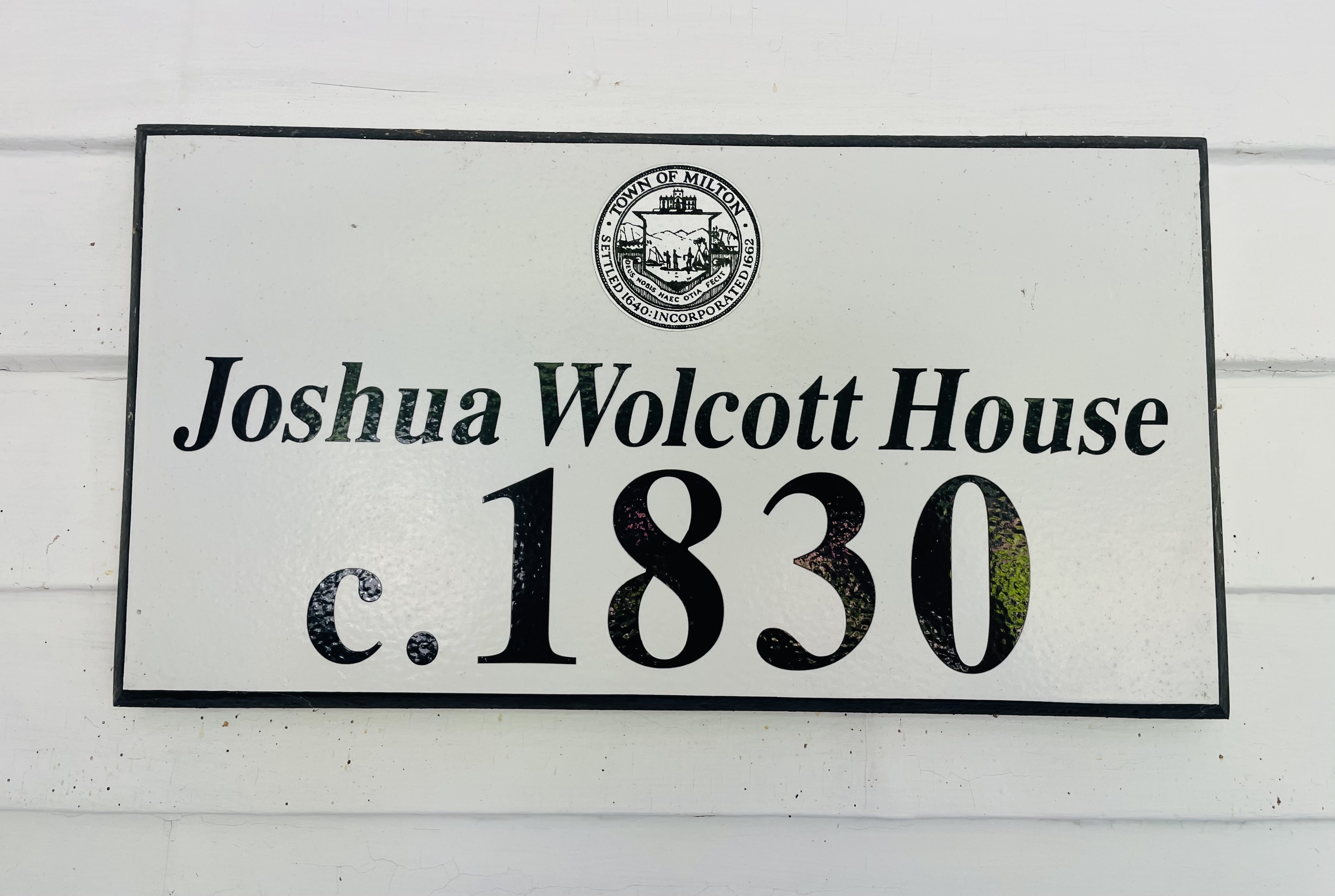
Milton historical society plaque

The Joshua Wolcott House is the childhood home of former Massachusetts Governor Roger Wolcott located at 1733 Canton Avenue in Milton, Massachusetts. The house was originally built by Leonard Morse circa 1830, and purchased by Joshua Wolcott in 1851 for himself and his second wife, Harriet Frothingham Wolcott. A Federal style home, the Wolcotts made several additions to the house in 1851 upon the return from their honeymoon and, again, in 1929, including the addition of a Victorian tower, "Nasturtium Room," and grand dining room expansion, but the original facade and footprint of the 1830 home was always kept intact. Today, the house has been renovated to maintain its historical period significance, and appears much as it did when it was first built. The house is on the historical listing of Milton, Massachusetts, and is the original namesake of the "Wolcott Woods" estates set across Canton Avenue on the lands previously owned by Joshua and then Roger Wolcott.

== Historical significance ==
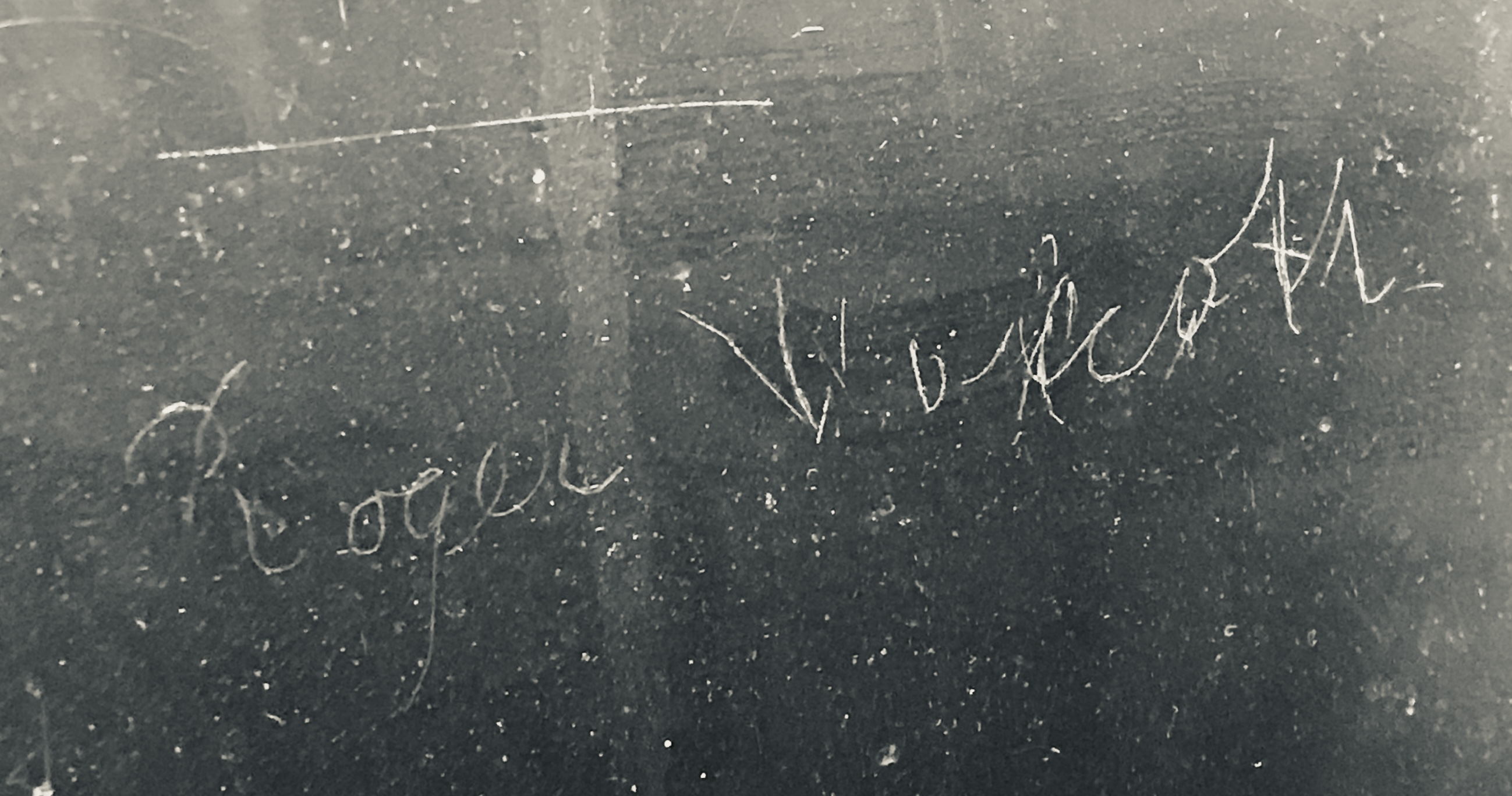
Roger's childhood window etching of his name

Joshua Huntington Wolcott (August 29, 1804 – January 4, 1891) was the grandson of Oliver Wolcott (1726-1797), a member of the Continental Congress and signer of the Declaration of Independence, and great-grandson of Roger Wolcott (1679-1767) who was Governor of the State of Connecticut from 1751-1754. His son, Roger Wolcott (July 13, 1847 – December 21, 1901) became Governor of Massachusetts in 1896. Roger grew up as a boy in the family's primary residence at 238 Beacon Street in Boston, MA and their summer estate at what is now 1733 Canton Avenue. Known as "Blue Hill" for its proximity to the adjacent Blue Hills nature preserve, the Milton home was where Roger and his brother Huntington Wolcott spent their summers and, after marrying his wife Edith in September 1874, where Roger and Edith returned to live at his father's house in the "Nasturtium Room" that was built as they traveled abroad. After two years of clearing the land across Canton Avenue, Roger's own, separate adult home was first constructed in 1878 at 1726 Canton Avenue, where he and his wife would later reside. This adult home unfortunately burned to the ground in 1888 and was subsequently rebuilt on the same location in 1890; today it has been remodeled into one of the houses on the "Wolcott Woods" condominium estates in Milton. The Joshua Wolcott house at 1733 Canton Avenue, however, still stands today in its original historic form, preserved with the original "Nasturtium Room" where Roger and Edith had lived, call boxes for Mr. and Mrs. Wolcott, and even the window pane in which Roger scratched his name as a young boy in the very room that his brother Huntington eventually died upon his return from fighting for the Union in the Civil War in 1865.

== Today ==
Today, the Joshua Wolcott house remains one of Milton, Massachusetts' original historic mansions, with over 9000 square feet of preserved living space and the original architecturally significant facade, renovations, and additions, including the signature Victorian tower, beamed Tudor-styled library, grand dining room, eleven fireplaces, and sprawling grounds. In addition to this childhood home of Governor Roger Wolcott, nearby Milton Academy also has a dormitory named "Wolcott House" in honor of Roger Wolcott's leadership and service to the state of Massachusetts, which was built in 1900 after his death. There is also a portrait of the former Governor by Frederick Porter Vinton which hangs in the Massachusetts State House.
