= 1895 Massachusetts gubernatorial election =

- November 5, 1895
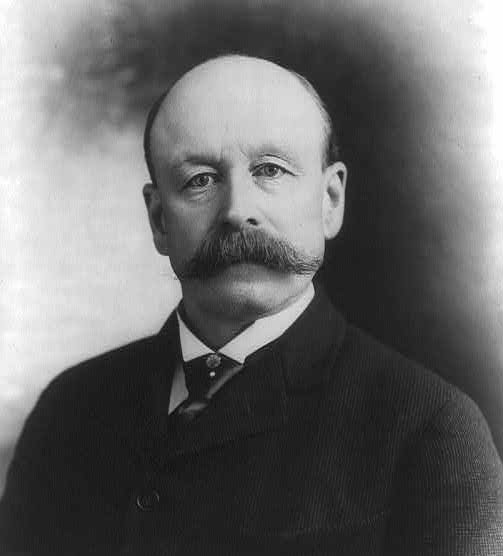

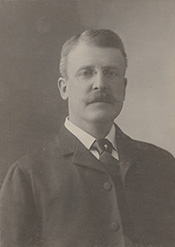
Nominee	Frederic Greenhalge	George Fred Williams
Party	Republican	Democratic
Popular vote	186,280	121,599
Percentage	56.77%	37.06%
- Greenhalge: 40-50% 50–60% 60–70% 70–80% 80–90% >90% Williams: 40-50% 50–60% 60–70% Brown: 40-50% Tie: 40-50%
Governor before election
Frederic Greenhalge
Republican
Elected Governor
Frederic Greenhalge
Republican

The 1895 Massachusetts gubernatorial election was held on November 5, 1895. Incumbent Republican Governor Frederic Greenhalge was re-elected to a third term in office, defeating Democratic U.S. Representative George Fred Williams.

== General election ==
=== Candidates ===
- E. Gerry Brown (Populist)
- Frederic Greenhalge, incumbent governor since 1894 (Republican)
- Edward Kendall (Prohibition)
- Moritz Ruther (Socialist Labor)
- George F. Williams, U.S. representative from Dedham (Democratic)

=== Results ===
1895 Massachusetts gubernatorial election
Party	Candidate	Votes	%	±%
Republican	Frederic Greenhalge (incumbent)	186,280	56.77%	▲0.32
Democratic	George Fred Williams	121,599	37.06%	▲0.10
Prohibition	Edward Kendall	9,170	2.80%	▼0.17
Populist	E. Gerry Brown	7,786	2.37%	▼0.33
Socialist Labor	Moritz E. Ruther	3,249	0.99%	▲0.06
Write-in	All others	37	0.01%	▲0.01
Total votes		328,121	100.00%	

== See also ==
- 1895 Massachusetts legislature
