= Roderick W. Moore =

Roderick Moore
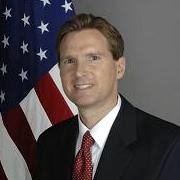

United States Ambassador to Bulgaria Acting
- In office August 5, 2015 – November 2, 2015
- President: Barack Obama
- Preceded by: Marcie Ries
- Succeeded by: Martina Strong (Acting)

United States Ambassador to Montenegro
- In office September 19, 2007 – August 8, 2010
- President: George W. Bush; Barack Obama
- Preceded by: Arlene Ferrill (Acting)
- Succeeded by: Sue Brown

Personal details
- Born: 1964 (age 61–62)
- Education: Brown University

Roderick Wemple Moore (born 1964) is the former Raymond Spruance Professor of National Security Affairs at the U.S. Naval War College in Newport, RI, from 2013 to 2015. During the latter part of 2015, he served as the Chargé d'Affaires of the U.S. Embassy in Sofia, Bulgaria.

From 2010 to 2013, he was the Principal Deputy High Representative and Brcko District Supervisor at the Office of the High Representative (OHR) in Sarajevo, Bosnia and Herzegovina. Prior to beginning his assignment at OHR, Moore served for three years (2007–2010) as the first American Ambassador to Montenegro. He was nominated for that posting by President George W. Bush and confirmed by the U.S. Senate on June 29, 2007. Senator Barack Obama chaired the Senate confirmation hearing in June 2007 at which Ambassador-designate Moore testified. Then Under-Secretary of State for Political Affairs, R. Nicholas Burns, swore him in on September 12, 2007, in the Treaty Room of the State Department. He arrived in Montenegro and presented his credentials to Montenegrin President Filip Vujanović on September 18, 2007. He left post in August 2010.

== Career ==
Prior to his appointment to OHR in September 2010, Moore served as the first U.S. Ambassador to Montenegro from September 2007 to August 2010. Before Montenegro, Rod Moore served as Deputy Chief of Mission at the U.S. Embassy in Belgrade from January 2004 – June 2007. He also served (2000–2003) as Deputy Chief of Mission at the U.S. Embassy in Sofia, Bulgaria before his transfer to Belgrade.

Earlier in his career, Ambassador Moore held diplomatic postings at U.S. embassies in Port-au-Prince, Haiti (1988–1989) and Sofia (1990–1992). From 1992 to 1993, he was the Department of State's representative in Skopje, Macedonia. He later served as Political-Economic Counselor at the American Embassy in Zagreb, Croatia (1996–1999) and was Senior Political Adviser at the Office of Security and Cooperation in Europe (OSCE) Mission in Sarajevo, Bosnia-Herzegovina (1996).

In Washington, Ambassador Moore worked in the State Department's Operations Center (1992) and later served as political-military officer in the Department of State for all states in Central and Eastern Europe (1993–1995). While assigned as State Department Fellow at the Fletcher School of Law and Diplomacy from 1999 to 2000, he taught about U.S. policy toward the former Yugoslavia.

Ambassador Moore has been a faculty associate teaching diplomacy for students of Arizona State University since 2020. He is also a member of the boards of the America for Bulgaria Foundation and the Bulgaria-America Society.

== Education ==
Ambassador Moore attended Brown University where he received his B.A. in Russian Studies and International Relations in 1986, and an M.A. in Slavic Linguistics in 1987. His languages include Serbo-Croatian, Bulgarian, Macedonian, Russian, Czech, French, Spanish and Haitian Creole.

Rod Moore grew up in East Greenwich, Rhode Island, where he attended East Greenwich High School. He is the youngest of three sons of David and Winifred Moore. His brothers, Geoff and Dwight, live in Toronto, Ontario, Canada, and Boxborough, Massachusetts, respectively. He is married to the former Ljubica Stamenkovic Moore, an attorney from Belgrade, Serbia, and lives in Arlington, Virginia.

== Notes ==
Diplomatic posts
Preceded by Arlene Ferrill; Acting	United States Ambassador to Montenegro; 2007–2010	Succeeded by Sue Brown
Preceded by Marcie Ries	United States Ambassador to Bulgaria; Acting; 2015	Succeeded by Martina Strong; Acting
