= Roger Wolcott (Massachusetts politician) =

American politician (1847–1900)

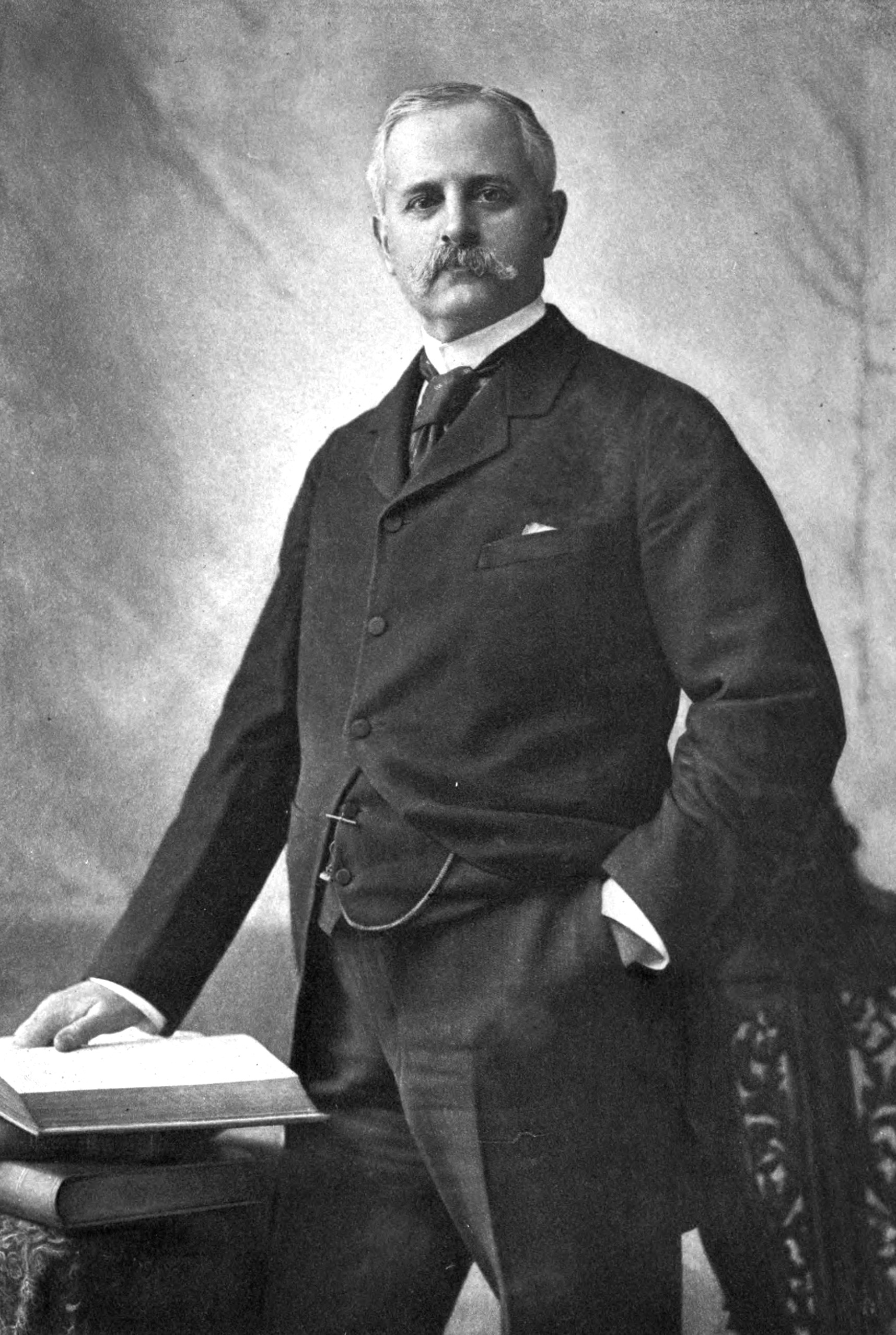

39th Governor of Massachusetts
- In office January, 1897 – January 4, 1900; Acting: March 4, 1896–January 1897
- Lieutenant: Winthrop M. Crane
- Preceded by: Frederic T. Greenhalge
- Succeeded by: Winthrop M. Crane

36th Lieutenant Governor of Massachusetts
- In office 1893–1897
- Governor: William E. Russell; Frederic T. Greenhalge
- Preceded by: William H. Haile
- Succeeded by: Winthrop M. Crane

Personal details
- Born: July 13, 1847 Boston, Massachusetts, U.S.
- Died: December 21, 1900 (aged 53) Boston, Massachusetts, U.S.
- Party: Republican

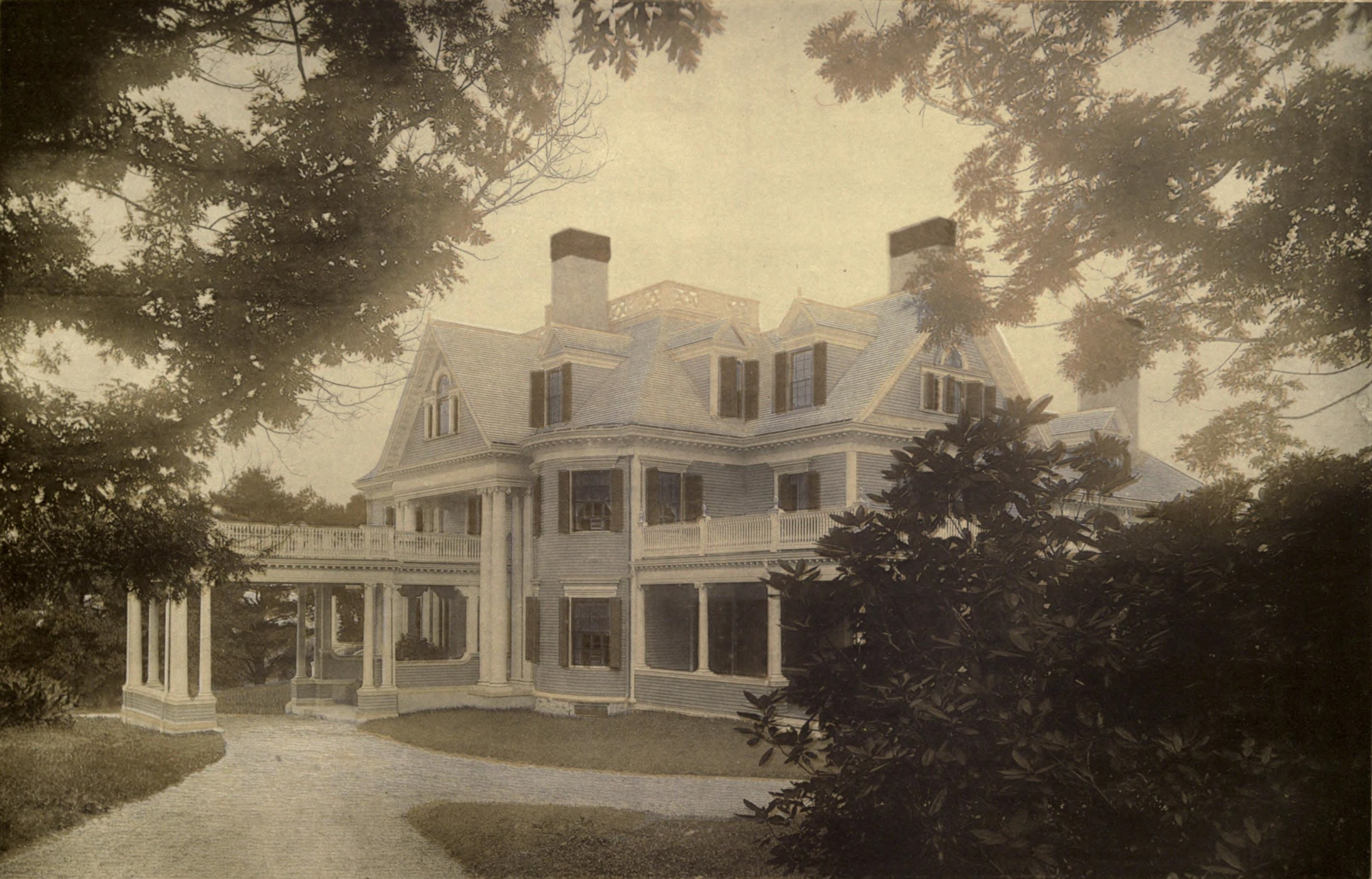
Wolcott's house in Milton, designed by Peabody & Stearns

Roger Wolcott (July 13, 1847 – December 21, 1900) was an American lawyer and Republican politician from Massachusetts. He was the 36th lieutenant governor of Massachusetts from 1893 to 1897, becoming acting governor in 1896 upon the death of Governor Frederic T. Greenhalge. He was elected the 39th governor of Massachusetts in his own right in 1897, serving until 1900. He was a leading figure in the Young Republican Club, which revitalized the Massachusetts Republican Party in the 1890s.

== Early years ==
Roger Wolcott was born in Boston, Massachusetts on July 13, 1847. He was the son of Joshua Huntington Wolcott (1804-1891) and Cornelia (Frothingham) Wolcott, and was descended from Connecticut Founding Father Oliver Wolcott. His father was a successful businessman, having long been associated with the textile firm of A. & A. Lawrence. Around 1830, he built the house that Roger grew up in. It is still preserved today. Roger Wolcott was first educated at a private school in Boston. After his older brother was killed in the American Civil War, the family traveled to Europe, visiting England, Switzerland, and France, during which Wolcott continued his studies.

Upon the family's return to Boston Wolcott entered Harvard College as a sophomore, graduating in 1870. He then attended Harvard Law School, graduating in 1874, and was admitted to the Suffolk County bar the same year. He married Edith Prescott on September 2, 1874; she was the great-granddaughter of Colonel William Prescott. The couple spent a year-long honeymoon in Europe.

== Career ==
Wolcott opened a law office in Boston in 1875. He became increasingly involved in the affairs of his father's business associates, eventually being appointed to serve on a number of corporate boards. Businesses he was associated with included the Boston and Albany Railroad and the New England Trust Company. He was also involved in philanthropic organizations, serving as a member of the Boston Provident Association, and as trustee of the Eye and Ear Infirmary and the Massachusetts General Hospital. He was a member of the Massachusetts Historical Society, and an overseer of Harvard College.

Wolcott became involved in politics not long after opening his law practice, winning a seat on the Boston Common Council in 1877 which he held for three years. He served as a member of the Massachusetts Legislature (Massachusetts General Court) from 1881 to 1884, and was offered the Republican Party nomination for Mayor of Boston in 1885, but refused on account of his father's poor health. Wolcott cared for his father until his death in 1891.

Wolcott began to assume a more prominent role in Republican circles after his father's death. He was a founding member and the first president of the Young Republican Club, an organization designed to inject new life into the party. This organization promoted him as a potential candidate for lieutenant governor. In the 1892 state convention, Wolcott won the nomination despite opposition from some party leaders. Even though the Republican gubernatorial candidate, William H. Haile, lost to incumbent Democrat William Russell, Wolcott won his race. He served as the 36th Lieutenant Governor from 1893 to 1897, first under Russell, and then under Republican Frederic T. Greenhalge. He assumed the gubernatorial duties as Acting Governor in March 1896 as a result of the death of Greenhalge, and was later elected as the 39th governor in November, serving from 1897 until 1900. He was reelected each year by large popular majorities.

While Governor, Wolcott approved a bill authorizing the purchase by the Boston Elevated Railway the state-owned Tremont Street Subway tunnel, but required a public referendum on the proposed purchase. When it was brought to a vote, it was defeated by a 2-to-1 margin. When the Spanish–American War broke out in 1898, Wolcott immediately put the state on a war footing, securing legislative authorization for military expenditures in just 25 minutes. The state was one of the first to supply militia troops to the war effort.

In 1899, Wolcott decided not to run for reelection. He was offered a variety of diplomatic posts by President William McKinley, but refused them, and embarked on a trip to Europe with his family in May 1900. After his return he campaigned for Republicans in the 1900 elections. He fell ill with typhoid fever in mid-November, and died in Boston on December 21, 1900.

The trustees of Milton Academy named the largest of the campus houses after Gov. Wolcott following his death in 1900.

== Notes ==
Party political offices
Preceded by Frederic T. Greenhalge	Republican nominee for Governor of Massachusetts; 1896, 1897, 1898	Succeeded by Winthrop M. Crane
Political offices
Preceded by William H. Haile	Lieutenant Governor of Massachusetts; 1893–1897; Acting Governor, 1896–1897	Succeeded by Winthrop M. Crane
Preceded by Frederic T. Greenhalge	Governor of Massachusetts; 1897–1900	Succeeded by Winthrop M. Crane
