= John T. Coughlin =

American politician (1873–1936)

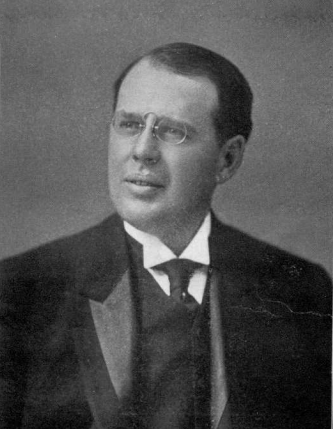

Mayor of Fall River, Massachusetts
- In office 1904–1910
- Preceded by: George Grime
- Succeeded by: Thomas F. Higgins

Personal details
- Born: January 1, 1873 Fall River, Massachusetts, U.S.
- Died: June 13, 1936 (aged 63) Boston, Massachusetts, U.S.
- Party: Democratic
- Education: Boston University School of Law
- Occupation: Lawyer

John T. Coughlin (January 1, 1873 – June 13, 1936) was an American politician who served as mayor of Fall River, Massachusetts.

Coughlin was born in Fall River on January 1, 1873, to Thomas and Margaret (Foley) Coughlin. One of Coughlin's cousins, John W. Coughlin, served as Fall River mayor from 1891 to 1894. Coughlin read law in the office of Hugh A. Dubuque and graduated from the Boston University School of Law in 1900.

In 1904, Coughlin defeated Fall River Mayor George Grime by 749 votes. In 1908 he was urged to run for Governor or Lieutenant Governor, but did not believe he was ready for a statewide race. He was a candidate in the 1909 Massachusetts gubernatorial election, but was defeated at the Democratic state convention by James H. Vahey 384 votes to 198. Coughlin did not run for reelection in 1910 and was succeeded by Thomas F. Higgins. Coughlin died on June 13, 1936, at Baker Memorial Hospital following an operation.
