= Eben Sumner Draper =

American politician and businessman (1858-1914)

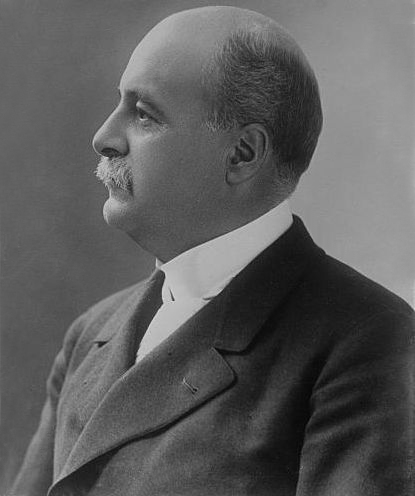
- Photo c. 1914

44th Governor of Massachusetts
- In office January 7, 1909 – January 5, 1911
- Lieutenant: Louis A. Frothingham
- Preceded by: Curtis Guild Jr.
- Succeeded by: Eugene Foss

40th Lieutenant Governor of Massachusetts
- In office January 4, 1906 – January 7, 1909
- Governor: Curtis Guild Jr.
- Preceded by: Curtis Guild Jr.
- Succeeded by: Louis A. Frothingham

Chairperson of the Massachusetts Republican Party
- In office 1896–1897
- Preceded by: George H. Lyman
- Succeeded by: A. H. Goetting
- In office 1892–1893
- Preceded by: Joseph Burdett
- Succeeded by: Samuel Winslow

Personal details
- Born: June 17, 1858 Hopedale, Massachusetts, U.S.
- Died: April 9, 1914 (aged 55) Greenville, South Carolina, U.S.
- Party: Republican
- Spouse: Nannie Bristow
- Children: 3

Eben (sometimes incorrectly Ebenezer) Sumner Draper (June 17, 1858 – April 9, 1914) was an American businessman and politician from Massachusetts. He was for many years a leading figure in what later became the Draper Corporation, the dominant manufacturer of cotton textile process machinery in the world during the late 19th and early 20th centuries. He served as the 44th governor of Massachusetts from 1909 to 1911.

== Early life and career ==
Eben Sumner Draper was born in Hopedale, Massachusetts on June 17, 1858, the third and youngest son of George and Hannah B. (Thwing) Draper. His brothers were William F. Draper, who would become a general and a U.S. representative, and George A. Draper, with whom he would control the family business. He was educated in the public schools of Hopedale, in Allen's School at West Newton, and in the class of 1880 of the Massachusetts Institute of Technology.

The Drapers were one of the leading families of Hopedale, a community that had been established as an experiment in Christian communal living. At the center of the community were a collection of factories principally engaged in the production of textile manufacturing equipment. Eben's father, a major shareholder of the community, capitalized on financial difficulties in the businesses and the informal means by which they were organized to gain complete control of them in the 1850s. He then took advantage of patents developed by his brother Ebenezer and protectionist tariffs to build a dominant monopoly position in the production of cotton textile processing machinery, and expanded his business interests to include a variety of other industrial manufacturing in Hopedale. All three of his sons were eventually drafted into the business. By the time Eben Draper graduated, his father controlled the largest plant for manufacturing cotton machinery in the world. Draper spent three years in apprenticeship in various cotton mills learning all he could about cotton manufacturing before being made a partner in his father's firm.

When the Hopedale companies organized into one, Draper was given charge of the selling department. Following the elder Draper's death in 1887 control (and majority ownership) of the business passed to William. He incorporated the Draper Company (later the Draper Corporation), which introduced the innovative Northrop Loom to great success.

William Draper, however, was a largely absentee owner, serving first in the United States Congress and then as United States Ambassador to Italy. The family business was reorganized (historian William Tucker describes it as a "coup" by Eben and his brother George) in the 1890s, at which time Eben Draper became its president.

Hopedale as at the time seen as a model company town. The Drapers owned most of the housing in the town, but did not charge excessive rents to the factory workers, and offered services such as medical care to their employees. The company was, however, a nonunion shop that did not pay very high wages, and the Drapers also moved some of their production to lower-wage areas of the southern United States during his administration of the business.

== Entry into politics ==
Draper served as a private in the Massachusetts First Corps of Cadets before and during the 1898 Spanish–American War, serving as president of the Massachusetts Volunteer Association.

Draper was a leading figure of the "Young Republican Club" (later just the "Republican Club"), whose members dominated the state Republican Party establishment in the early 20th century. Like his father and brothers, he was also a strong supporter of protectionist tariffs. He assisted his father in founding the Home Market Club of Boston, a protectionist organization in New England. He served as chairman of the Congressional campaign committee which waged a successful campaign to send his brother William as a protectionist to the US House of Representatives. He was then elected as chairman of the Republican State Committee, serving on several victorious campaigns. In 1896 he was elected chairman of the Massachusetts Republican delegation to the St. Louis Convention, which nominated William McKinley for president. During the convention, he was instrumental in assisting Henry Cabot Lodge to secure a plank in the party platform favoring the gold standard. He also served in the presidential election of 1900 as a Presidential elector, again supporting McKinley.

== Governorship ==
In 1905, Draper was nominated and elected as Lieutenant Governor of Massachusetts, considered by the party to be a stepping stone in an "escalator" of statewide offices culminating in the governorship. Draper served for three terms under Governor Curtis Guild Jr., acting as governor for a significant part of 1908, when Guild was ill with pneumonia and appendicitis. Draper and Guild were emblematic of growing divisions in the party: Guild was progressive and reform-oriented, supporting tariff reform, while Draper was conservative, pro-business, and anti-reform. While acting as governor, Draper rejected a pro-labor nominee chosen by Guild for the state's bureau of labor statistics.

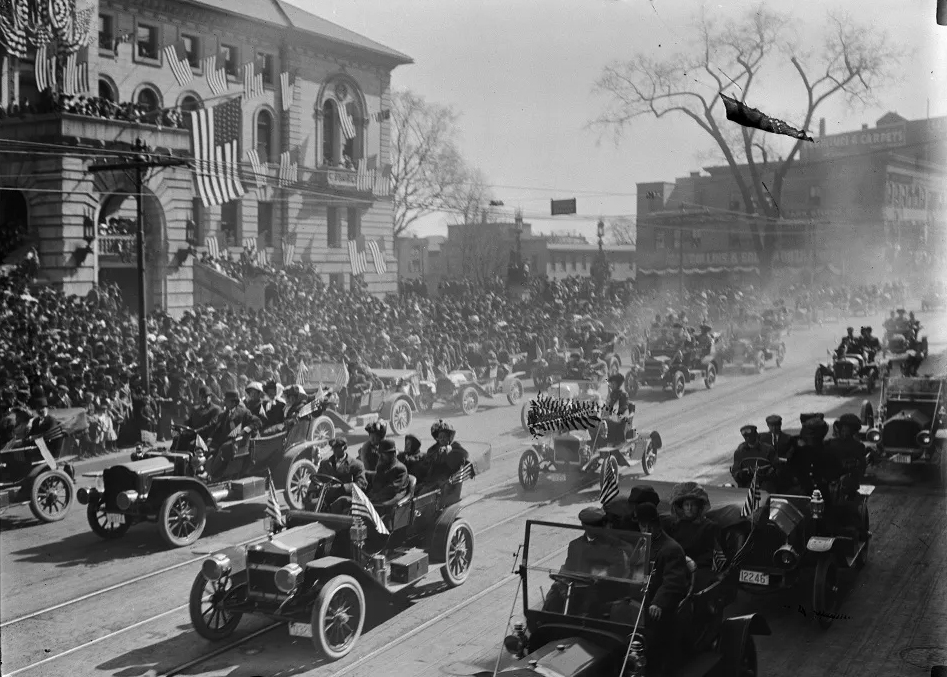
Draper accompanies President Taft in Worcester, Massachusetts in 1910

In 1908, Draper was elected Governor, standing against Democrat James H. Vahey. Vahey attacked the Republican ticket, which included another pro-business conservative in Louis A. Frothingham, as demonstrative of the influence of money in politics. The Democrats were otherwise poorly organized, with Vahey, an Irish American from Watertown failing to get support from old-line Democrats and the Boston political machine, and Draper won a comfortable (60,000-vote) victory in a fairly listless campaign.

Draper's two terms as governor deepened the divisions in the Republican party. He vetoed pro-labor bills, including one that would have closed a contractor loophole allowing extended work hours, and the party-controlled legislature refused to enact a bill lowering the maximum weekly work time from 56 to 54 hours. These positions led to a loss of support in the state's urban centers, but did not prevent him from winning reelection over Vahey in 1909, albeit by a reduced margin. Draper also signed a bill legalizing the de facto merger of the Boston and Maine Railroad with the New York, New Haven and Hartford Railroad, signaling approval of what were seen then as monopolistic business practices.

In 1910, Governor Draper drove with President William Howard Taft, in the state on an official visit, to pay respects to Taft's ancestral family homes in Mendon and Uxbridge, just west of Hopedale.

== Later years ==
The 1910 election saw the party divisions lead to a fracture. Eugene Noble Foss, a Boston businessman, bolted the Republican Party, and ran for election as a Democrat, effectively self-financing his campaign. He ran as an essentially single-issue candidate, seeking tariff reform, in particular reciprocity in trade with Canada. Draper, running for a third term, upset local dairy farmers by allowing the railroads to raise rates on milk shipments. This led to protests and a brief embargo of deliveries to the Boston area, which Draper countered weakly by criticising railroad management for its pricing tactics. Foss won the governor's race by a 32,000-vote margin, but his win was not reflected in Democratic gains anywhere else.

Draper continued to serve as the managing head of the family business. He was considered a candidate for the United States Senate seat of fellow Republican Murray Crane in 1913. The party, then under the control of its hardline conservative faction (and in control of the legislature, which then elected senators), chose John W. Weeks. His company became the focus of labor organization by the Industrial Workers of the World (IWW, or "Wobblies"), who engineered a strike in 1912. Although they nominally sought higher wages and a shorter work week, there was a political dimension to the strike: the IWW specifically targeted Draper because of his protectionist and anti-labor actions taken while governor. Both Nicola Sacco, a former employee of The Draper Company, and Bartolomeo Vanzetti were very active in this strike and several others that affected The Draper Company.

== Personal life and death ==
Draper married Nannie Bristow, the daughter of United States Secretary of the Treasury Benjamin Bristow, in 1883. The couple had three children:

- Benjamin Helm Bristow Draper
- Eben Sumner Draper Jr.
- Dorothy Draper

Draper was active in the Unitarian church. His wife died in 1913. Draper died on April 9, 1914, in Greenville, South Carolina, following what was described in his obituary as "a shock of paralysis" suffered as he was making "a visit to the far South in search of health." His funeral in Boston was attended by then Governor David I. Walsh, among others. Burial was in the family mausoleum in the Hopedale Village Cemetery.

== Sources ==
- Commercial and Financial New England Illustrated. Boston: Boston Herald. 1906. OCLC 11416386.
- "Draper, Eben Sumner". National Cyclopedia of American Biography. New York: James T. White. 1910. pp. 386–387. OCLC 79720004.
- The Tariff Review. New York: American Tariff League. 1914. OCLC 1606430.
- Abrams, Richard (1964). Conservatism in a Progressive Era: Massachusetts Politics 1900-1912. Cambridge, MA: Harvard University Press. OCLC 475077.
- Winthorp, Marvin L., ed. (1914). "Eben S. Draper, Obituary". Bulletin of the National Association of Wool Manufacturers. Vol. XLIV. The Rockwell and Churchill Press. pp. 187–189.
- Tejada, Susan (2012). In Search of Sacco and Vanzetti. Boston: Northeastern University Press. ISBN 9781555537302. OCLC 760976164.

Party political offices
Preceded by Curtis Guild Jr.	Republican nominee for Governor of Massachusetts; 1908, 1909, 1910	Succeeded by Louis A. Frothingham
Political offices
Preceded by Curtis Guild Jr.	Lieutenant Governor of Massachusetts; 1906–1909	Succeeded by Louis A. Frothingham
Preceded by Curtis Guild Jr.	Governor of Massachusetts; 1909–1911	Succeeded by Eugene Foss
