= George F. Williams =

American politician

George Fred Williams
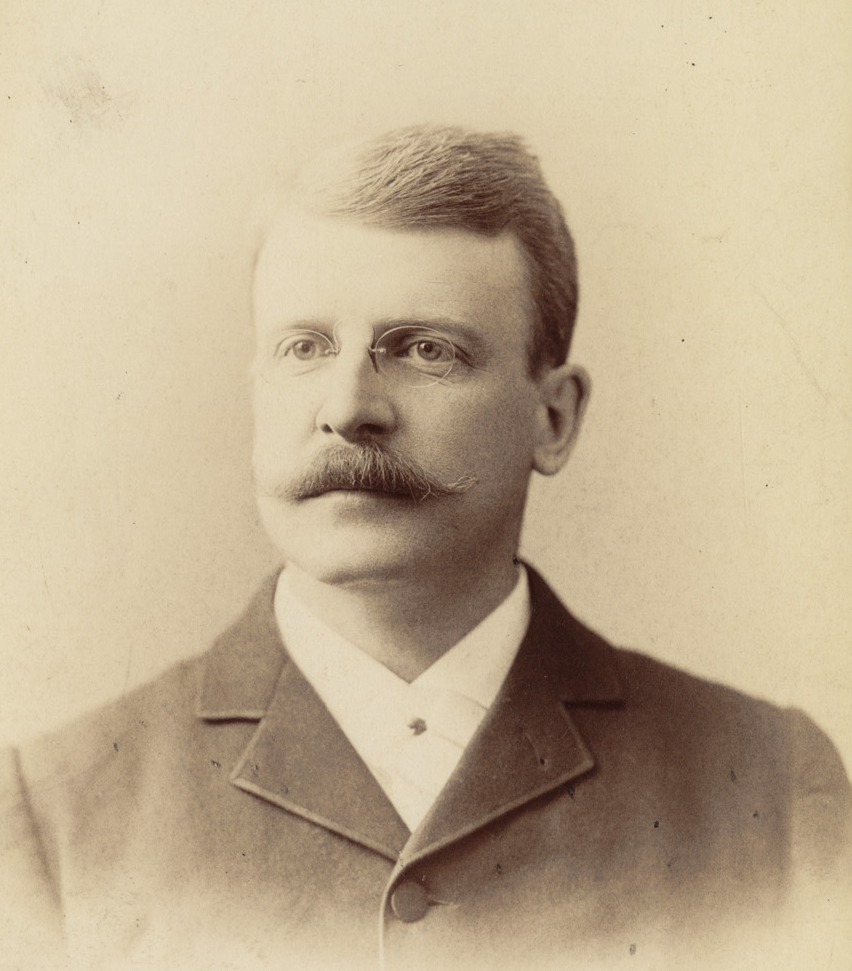

5th United States Minister to Montenegro
- In office May 10, 1914 – September 28, 1914
- President: Woodrow Wilson
- Preceded by: Jacob Gould Schurman
- Succeeded by: Garrett Droppers

United States Minister to Greece
- In office February 2, 1914 – September 28, 1914
- President: Woodrow Wilson
- Preceded by: Jacob Gould Schurman
- Succeeded by: Garrett Droppers

Member of the U.S. House of Representatives from Massachusetts's 9th district
- In office March 4, 1891 – March 3, 1893
- Preceded by: John W. Candler
- Succeeded by: Joseph H. O'Neil

Personal details
- Born: July 10, 1852 Dedham, Massachusetts, U.S.
- Died: July 11, 1932 (aged 80) Brookline, Massachusetts, U.S.
- Party: Republican (until 1884); Democratic
- Education: Dartmouth College; Boston University

George Fred Williams (July 10, 1852 – July 11, 1932) was a U.S. representative from Massachusetts and envoy extraordinary and minister plenipotentiary to both Greece and Montenegro.

== Early life and career ==
Born in Dedham, Massachusetts, Williams attended private schools, graduated from the Dedham High School in 1868, and from Dartmouth College in 1872. His parents were Captain and Henrietta (née Rice) Williams. His mother was a Sunday School teacher at the Allin Congregational Church. He studied at the Universities of Heidelberg and Berlin. He also studied law at Boston University, Boston, Massachusetts.

He taught school in West Brewster, Massachusetts in 1872 and 1873. He was also a reporter for the Boston Globe. He was admitted to the bar in 1875 and practiced in Boston. He edited Williams' Citations of Massachusetts Cases in 1878 and volumes 10 to 17 of the Annual Digest of the United States 1880 to 1887.

== Public life ==
Initially a Republican, Williams bolted the party in the Mugwump revolt of 1884, and eventually joined the Democratic Party. He served as member of the Dedham School Committee before being elected to the Massachusetts House of Representatives in 1890. Williams was elected to the Fifty-second Congress (March 4, 1891 – March 3, 1893) but lost a bid for reelection in 1892 to the Fifty-third Congress.

He resumed the practice of law in Boston, Massachusetts and was an unsuccessful Democratic nominee for governor in 1895, 1896, and 1897. He served as delegate to several state Democratic conventions and to the Democratic National Conventions in 1896, 1900, 1904 and 1908. In the 1896 convention, he bucked the state party establishment by abandoning the gold plank supported by the rest of the delegation, and supported William Jennings Bryan for president. This action did tremendous damage to his future elective prospects within the party.

Williams was appointed Minister to Greece and Montenegro by President Woodrow Wilson, serving in 1914. He resigned this position after a visit to Albania witnessing the tragic Albanian civilians being murdered and left to die of hunger by the current regime.

== Later life ==
He resumed the practice of law until his retirement in 1930 and died in Brookline, near Boston, July 11, 1932. He was interred in Dedham's Old Village Cemetery.

Party political offices
Preceded by John E. Russell	Democratic nominee for Governor of Massachusetts; 1895, 1896, 1897	Succeeded by Alexander B. Bruce
U.S. House of Representatives
Preceded by John W. Candler	Member of the U.S. House of Representatives from Massachusetts's 9th congressional district March 4, 1891 – March 3, 1893	Succeeded by Joseph H. O'Neil
Diplomatic posts
Preceded by Jacob Gould Schurman	United States Minister to Greece; 1914	Succeeded by Garrett Droppers
Preceded by Jacob Gould Schurman	United States Minister to Montenegro; 1914	Succeeded by Garrett Droppers
