= 1906 Massachusetts legislature =

127th Massachusetts General Court
←	126th	128th	→

Overview
- Legislative body: General Court
- Election: November 7, 1905

Senate
- Members: 40
- President: William F. Dana
- Party control: Republican (31–9)

House
- Members: 240
- Speaker: John N. Cole
- Party control: Republican (165–69–6)

Sessions
- 1st: January 3, 1906 – June 29, 1906

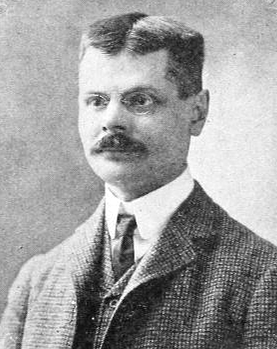
William Dana, Senate president.

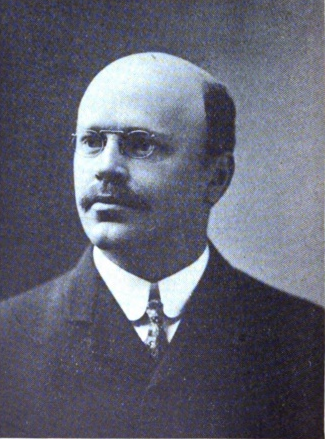
John Cole, House speaker.

Leaders of the Massachusetts General Court, 1906.

The 127th Massachusetts General Court, consisting of the Massachusetts Senate and the Massachusetts House of Representatives, met in 1906 during the governorship of Curtis Guild Jr. William F. Dana served as president of the Senate and John N. Cole served as speaker of the House.

== Senators ==
image	name	date of birth	district
	John E. Beck	May 10, 1869	
	William J. Bullock	January 31, 1864	
	Allan G. Buttrick	March 16, 1876	
	Thomas F. Cassidy	June 1, 1875	
	Frank M. Chace	April 16, 1856	
	William D. Chapple	August 6, 1868	
	Chester W. Clark	August 9, 1851	
	Morton E. Converse	November 17, 1837	
	Guy W. Cox	January 19, 1871	
	Louis Cox	November 22, 1874	
	Prentiss Cummings	September 10, 1840	
	John F. Cusick	February 20, 1869	
	William F. Dana	June 26, 1863	
	Charles Leroy Dean	May 29, 1844	
	William H. Feiker	March 11, 1870	
	George H. Garfield	July 18, 1858	
	John J. Gartland	November 27, 1871	
	Frank Gerrett	February 4, 1857	
	John M. Grosvenor Jr.	April 22, 1864	
	Heman A. Harding	February 6, 1871	
	Sidney Adelvin Hill	August 26, 1849	
	Horton H. Hilton	December 11, 1869	
	Samuel E. Hull	August 12, 1843	
	Harrie C. Hunter	March 16, 1869	
	William S. Kyle	July 12, 1851	
	Daniel W. Lane	December 11, 1871	
	Edward L. Logan	January 20, 1875	
	Frederick J. Macleod	June 30, 1870	
	Daniel D. Mahoney	March 27, 1862	
	James J. Mellen	March 30, 1875	
	Edward B. Nevin	November 10, 1858	
	Fordis C. Parker	January 3, 1868	
	Charles N. Prouty	October 6, 1842	
	Silas Dean Reed	June 25, 1872	
	George A. Schofield	April 26, 1863	
	Frank Seiberlich	October 29, 1874	
	Elmer A. Stevens	January 15, 1862	
	Arthur M. Taft	January 28, 1854	
	William Taylor	May 5, 1862	
	James H. Walker	August 24, 1872	

== Representatives ==
image	name	date of birth	district
	Gideon B. Abbott	May 4, 1874	
	James Sidney Allen	July 3, 1831	
	Henry Stoddard Ames	May 21, 1861	
	William H. Ames	March 1, 1861	
	Charles A. Andrews	July 2, 1872	
	William A. Bailey	September 26, 1849	
	Arthur Wesley Barker	September 19, 1847	
	George L. Barnes	June 24, 1879	
	James Timothy Barrett	February 10, 1870	
	James W. Barry	April 6, 1865	
	J. Edward Barry	September 18, 1874	
	Moses Bassett	March 28, 1869	
	Frank A. Bayrd	September 1, 1873	
	Fred Alfred Bearse	February 15, 1871	
	William A. Bell	December 22, 1856	
	March G. Bennett	January 31, 1869	
	Frank P. Bennett Jr.	December 30, 1878	
	Frederick Leonard Beunke	June 15, 1856	
	George Frederick Birch	April 12, 1848	
	C. Edward Blanchard	August 20, 1861	
	Charles V. Blanchard	February 2, 1866	
	Stephen H. Bodurtha	March 10, 1858	
	G. Arthur Bodwell	July 4, 1859	
	Fred Eldridge Bolton	December 6, 1869	
	Bart Bossidy	September 30, 1876	
	Edward A. Bower	August 1, 1869	
	Eugene T. Brazzell	March 21, 1878	
	William M. Brigham	January 23, 1864	
	William R. Brooks	March 1, 1865	
	Timothy J. Buckley	April 24, 1870	
	Addison Eleazer Bullard	March 7, 1855	
	Andrew J. Burnett	1860	
	Herbert W. Burr	June 15, 1866	
	John J. Butler	June 7, 1865	
	Edward C. Callahan	March 14, 1874	
	William Henry Carter	June 15, 1864	
	Clarence A. Chandler	October 27, 1852	
	Ezra W. Clark	October 12, 1842	
	Allen Clark	April 1, 1870	
	Samuel A. Clark	December 10, 1852	
	Samuel F. Coffin	December 27, 1851	
	John N. Cole	November 4, 1863	
	Martin F. Conley	April 27, 1870	
	John J. Conway	September 12, 1873	
	William H. Cook	March 7, 1856	
	Michael J. Coyle	September 27, 1864	
	Lyman Alexander Crafts	October 28, 1854	
	Edward C. Creed	January 5, 1877	
	Grafton D. Cushing	August 4, 1864	
	Michael P. Daly	January 14, 1876	
	Charles L. Davenport	May 4, 1854	
	Thomas L. Davis	March 15, 1852	
	Charles Austin Dean	March 26, 1856	
	William M. Dean	November 16, 1874	
	Robert T. Delano	July 13, 1857	
	Charles Edwin Dennett	November 13, 1837	
	Daniel Edward Denny	July 14, 1845	
	John Diggins	November 14, 1877	
	J. Frank Donahue	August 29, 1865	
	William J. Doogue	April 28, 1876	
	John J. Douglass	February 9, 1873	
	Thomas Dowd	May 1, 1864	
	Jeremiah F. Downey	February 9, 1878	
	Andrew P. Doyle	August 15, 1869	
	John J. Driscoll	March 27, 1876	
	Thomas F. Driscoll	November 5, 1860	
	Patrick J. Duane	August 18, 1862	
	William C. Dunham	September 14, 1830	
	Theodore F. Dwight	September 19, 1863	
	Ebenezer Alden Dyer	July 17, 1857	
	Jonathan P. Edwards	April 7, 1854	
	Winslow H. Edwards	August 13, 1870	
	John F. Egan	July 6, 1874	
	Eugene F. Endicott	October 14, 1848	
	Wilmot R. Evans Jr.	March 18, 1878	
	Fred A. Ewell	June 12, 1865	
	William Otis Faxon	October 24, 1853	
	Francis Joseph Fennelly	February 18, 1860	
	Jacob Bernard Ferber	May 28, 1876	
	Edward F. Fitzgerald	December 2, 1872	
	Josiah Willard Flint	November 4, 1840	
	Clarence J. Fogg	July 10, 1853	
	Watson P. Gage	July 9, 1841	
	Warren E. Gammell	August 25, 1831	
	Félix Gatineau	November 12, 1857	
	Frank E. Gaylord	May 1, 1868	
	Frank J. Gethro	April 20, 1872	
	Chester E. Gleason	March 13, 1869	
	Theodore A. Glynn	November 8, 1881	
	Joseph D. Goddu	October 22, 1867	
	John W. Goodhue	April 10, 1858	
	Frank W. Goodwin	October 25, 1876	
	Robert J. Gove	May 22, 1863	
	Thomas J. Grady	December 16, 1877	
	William J. Graham	October 2, 1873	
	William H. Granger	June 28, 1838	
	Albert F. Grant	November 16, 1872	
	Lyman W. Griswold	October 16, 1869	
	William F. Haggerty	June 26, 1872	
	Frederick P. Hall	December 10, 1868	
	Delette H. Hall	March 20, 1843	
	Portus B. Hancock	February 19, 1836	
	William Henry Irving Hayes	June 21, 1848	
	Andrew F. Healy	July 20, 1878	
	Joseph H. Hibbard	April 5, 1860	
	John J. Higgins	May 17, 1865	
	Aubrey Hilliard	April 6, 1861	
	Michael B. Houlihan	March 24, 1874	
	Barker B. Howard	April 21, 1867	
	Alonzo F. Hoyle	October 16, 1861	
	Eugene Hultman	July 13, 1875	
	James H. Hutchings	October 20, 1862	
	George H. Jackson	March 9, 1865	
	George L. Jaques	May 5, 1866	
	Charles Cabot Johnson	December 9, 1876	
	James Albert Jones	January 14, 1853	
	Samuel O. Jones	November 17, 1858	
	David P. Keefe	September 29, 1855	
	William A. Kelleher	May 27, 1875	
	Clesson Kenney	May 31, 1839	
	Philip A. Kiely	February 16, 1874	
	Alec E. Knowlton	October 29, 1857	
	S. John Lamoureux	April 30, 1877	
	Thomas Leavitt	August 28, 1872	
	Edwin F. Leonard	July 15, 1862	
	John B. Locke	March 7, 1856	
	Martin Lomasney	December 3, 1859	
	George W. Long	July 28, 1872	
	John Fitch Lothrop	December 17, 1847	
	James Arnold Lowell	February 5, 1869	
	John B. Lowney	March 17, 1879	
	Robert Luce	December 2, 1862	
	James Michael Lynch	July 7, 1864	
	Charles H. Macomber	August 6, 1872	
	Harry E. Mapes	July 8, 1867	
	Charles Mayberry	April 27, 1876	
	Ulysses Everett Mayhew	August 16, 1848	
	Matthew McCann	1863	
	James F. McDermott	March 1, 1877	
	Daniel J. McDonald	August 14, 1872	
	John M. McDonald	June 2, 1873	
	Michael J. McEttrick	June 22, 1848	
	Robert K. McKirdy	October 4, 1870	
	Edwin T. McKnight	October 11, 1869	
	John J. McManmon	April 5, 1871	
	Edward L. McManus	December 22, 1866	
	Frank McNerney	September 4, 1870	
	James H. Mellen	November 7, 1845	
	Julius Meyers	December 6, 1854	
	John Joseph Mitchell	May 9, 1873	
	Jacob H. Mock	May 14, 1863	
	Joseph E. Mooney	June 25, 1874	
	George Henry Moore	May 16, 1844	
	Harry Payson Morse	July 27, 1854	
	Emil J. Muehlig	November 26, 1873	
	Timothy S. Murphy	June 27, 1877	
	Arthur L. Nason	October 24, 1872	
	Francis T. Nelson	November 11, 1851	
	George H. Newhall	October 24, 1850	
	William L. V. Newton	February 28, 1881	
	Arthur D. Norcross	November 7, 1848	
	Edward H. O'Brien	February 1, 1874	
	M. Fred O'Connell	June 14, 1870	
	Hugh O'Rourke	March 1, 1869	
	Frank E. Packard	May 7, 1857	
	Joseph A. Parks	May 2, 1877	
	W. Rodman Peabody	March 3, 1874	
	Pierre F. Peloquin	May 26, 1851	
	Michael F. Phelan	October 22, 1875	
	Amos A. Phelps	January 12, 1867	
	Stephen W. Phillips	January 9, 1873	
	John H. Pickford	September 9, 1849	
	Nathan H. Poor	April 14, 1840	
	Samuel L. Porter	November 10, 1869	
	Elmer C. Potter	August 23, 1868	
	Maurice J. Power	July 21, 1872	
	Melvin B. Putnam	April 8, 1845	
	John H. Quinlan	February 29, 1864	
	John Quinn, Jr.	December 16, 1859	
	Herbert S. Riley	December 20, 1859	
	Bradley M. Rockwood	May 24, 1862	
	Samuel Ross	February 2, 1865	
	Gilbert Jones Rugg	March 27, 1836	
	Edward Julius Sandberg	October 21, 1866	
	Henry O. Sawyer	June 10, 1844	
	George A. Scigliano	August 26, 1874	
	Henry Walter Seward	January 18, 1865	
	George A. Shackford	June 7, 1854	
	Nelson Sherburne	November 18, 1864	
	Joseph Sherman	September 7, 1840	
	Patrick J. Shiels	August 9, 1873	
	Levi M. Snow	April 19, 1841	
	Elijah Olin Snow	April 24, 1851	
	Joseph Soliday	1869	
	Nathaniel P. Sowle	October 30, 1857	
	Gilbert M. Stalker	February 19, 1857	
	Frank D. Stevens	November 13, 1852	
	John Adam Stoddart	May 10, 1869	
	Luke S. Stowe	August 9, 1834	
	Arthur H. Streeter	July 4, 1870	
	John F. Sullivan	May 17, 1875	
	Patrick John Sullivan	August 23, 1860	
	Simon Swig	May 15, 1865	
	Warren E. Tarbell	April 18, 1860	
	John Tarr	May 25, 1870	
	Richard S. Teeling	December 26, 1878	
	Clifford B. Terry	December 16, 1876	
	Frank W. Thayer	July 2, 1865	
	Jabez P. Thompson	July 24, 1853	
	Frederick H. Tilton	November 28, 1879	
	John Hugh Toland	October 8, 1870	
	Frank A. Torrey	December 21, 1874	
	Albert Totten	November 1, 1849	
	William H. Trudel	July 19, 1866	
	Noble B. Turner	November 5, 1848	
	William Turtle	June 20, 1855	
	Samuel A. Tuttle	September 11, 1837	
	Arthur P. Vinal	June 14, 1854	
	Albert Vittum	December 29, 1857	
	Joseph Walker	1865	
	Edward A. Walker	May 28, 1869	
	Joseph Walsh	December 16, 1875	
	Charles E. Ward	October 17, 1849	
	Walter Archibald Webster	December 4, 1875	
	A. S. Parker Weeks	April 29, 1857	
	William E. Weeks	1880	
	Arthur J. Wellington	July 21, 1871	
	Harvey Wheeler	November 5, 1847	
	Frank L. White	August 10, 1869	
	Henry O. Whiting	November 16, 1849	
	Charles J. Wier	February 24, 1868	
	Isaac E. Willetts	November 8, 1879	
	Thomas W. Williams	September 15, 1865	
	Harry N. Winch	October 8, 1868	
	Frederick G. Wooden	May 26, 1871	
	William H. Woodhead	September 17, 1860	
	John Wooldredge	September 9, 1851	
	Alvin L. Wright	October 28, 1857	
	Charles D. Young	June 10, 1857	

== See also ==
- 59th United States Congress
- List of Massachusetts General Courts
