= 1905 Massachusetts legislature =

126th Massachusetts General Court
←	125th	127th	→

Overview
- Legislative body: General Court
- Election: November 8, 1904

Senate
- Members: 40
- President: William F. Dana
- Party control: Republican (34–6)

House
- Members: 240
- Speaker: Louis A. Frothingham
- Party control: Republican (169–69–2)

Sessions
- 1st: January 4, 1905 – May 26, 1905

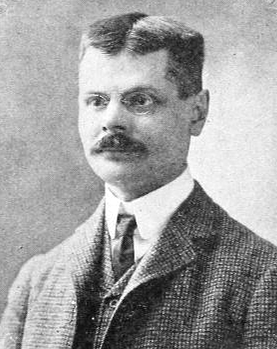
William Dana, Senate president.

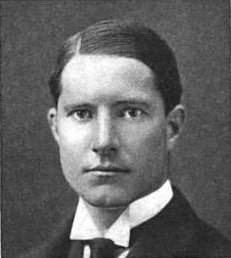
Louis Frothingham, House speaker.

Leaders of the Massachusetts General Court, 1905.

The 126th Massachusetts General Court, consisting of the Massachusetts Senate and the Massachusetts House of Representatives, met in 1905 during the governorship of William Lewis Douglas. William F. Dana served as president of the Senate and Louis A. Frothingham served as speaker of the House.

== Senators ==
image	name	date of birth	district
	John E. Beck	May 10, 1869	
	William J. Bullock	January 31, 1864	
	William A. Burns	January 9, 1875	
	Edward B. Callender	February 23, 1851	
	Edwin J. Castle	April 15, 1853	
	Frank M. Chace	April 16, 1856	
	Alvin B. Chamberlain	December 16, 1842	
	William D. Chapple	August 6, 1868	
	Edwards Cheney	May 3, 1861	
	Chester W. Clark	August 9, 1851	
	Thomas J. Collins	October 28, 1868	
	Morton E. Converse	November 17, 1837	
	William F. Craig	September 15, 1866	
	Prentiss Cummings	September 10, 1840	
	William F. Dana	June 26, 1863	
	Charles Leroy Dean	May 29, 1844	
	George H. Garfield	July 18, 1858	
	John J. Gartland	November 27, 1871	
	Frank Gerrett	February 4, 1857	
	Heman A. Harding	February 6, 1871	
	Frank M. Heath	September 8, 1852	
	Sidney Adelvin Hill	August 26, 1849	
	Samuel E. Hull	August 12, 1843	
	Harrie C. Hunter	March 16, 1869	
	Loren P. Keyes	January 6, 1838	
	Moody Kimball	July 2, 1862	
	William S. Kyle	July 12, 1851	
	Daniel W. Lane	December 11, 1871	
	David Dennis Leahy	April 15, 1876	
	James J. Mellen	March 30, 1875	
	Harold P. Moseley	November 13, 1871	
	John P. Munroe	June 28, 1850	
	Edward B. Nevin	November 10, 1858	
	Fordis C. Parker	January 3, 1868	
	Andrew James Peters	April 3, 1872	
	Silas Dean Reed	June 25, 1872	
	William J. Rounds	June 24, 1855	
	William Taylor	May 5, 1862	
	James H. Walker	August 24, 1872	
	John M. Woods	August 18, 1839	

== Representatives ==
image	name	date of birth	district
	Cecil L. Adams	June 14, 1878	
	William Leck Adams	October 24, 1852	
	James Sidney Allen	July 3, 1831	
	Henry Stoddard Ames	May 21, 1861	
	William H. Ames	March 1, 1861	
	James Robert Anderson	March 27, 1859	
	Charles A. Andrews	July 2, 1872	
	William A. Bailey	September 26, 1849	
	George O. Baker	April 6, 1835	
	Arthur Wesley Barker	September 19, 1847	
	George L. Barnes	June 24, 1879	
	James Barr	September 20, 1854	
	James Timothy Barrett	February 10, 1870	
	George H. Battis	1863	
	Fred Alfred Bearse	February 15, 1871	
	March G. Bennett	January 31, 1869	
	Frank P. Bennett Jr.	December 30, 1878	
	George Frederick Birch	April 12, 1848	
	Stephen H. Bodurtha	March 10, 1858	
	Henry E. Bodurtha	March 15, 1865	
	Richard Bossidy	December 1, 1864	
	Edward A. Bower	August 1, 1869	
	Rolfe Bradbury	March 12, 1861	
	Eugene T. Brazzell	March 21, 1878	
	Edward H. Brewer	December 12, 1851	
	William M. Brigham	January 23, 1864	
	Henry W. Brown	October 14, 1856	
	John J. Butler	June 7, 1865	
	Robert D. Cadagon	June 6, 1870	
	George H. Cadigan	February 22, 1873	
	Edward C. Callahan	March 14, 1874	
	John W. Chapin	January 28, 1859	
	James W. Chrystal	March 24, 1876	
	Maurice P. Clare	August 26, 1852	
	Ezra W. Clark	October 12, 1842	
	Edward E. Clark	November 4, 1870	
	John N. Cole	November 4, 1863	
	Walter L. Collins	April 7, 1878	
	Waldo E. Conant	February 1, 1855	
	John J. Conway	September 12, 1873	
	William H. Cook	March 7, 1856	
	Lyman Alexander Crafts	October 28, 1854	
	Edward C. Creed	January 5, 1877	
	Frank H. Crossman	January 12, 1846	
	Thomas F. Curley	March 22, 1871	
	William H. Cushman	June 8, 1850	
	Samuel Newton Cutler	January 25, 1855	
	Charles L. Davenport	May 4, 1854	
	Thomas L. Davis	March 15, 1852	
	Charles S. Davis	1858	
	Frederick Simpson Deitrick	April 9, 1875	
	Charles S. Denham	October 17, 1853	
	Francis J. Doherty	August 26, 1875	
	William J. Doogue	April 28, 1876	
	Thomas Dowd	May 1, 1864	
	Jeremiah F. Downey	February 9, 1878	
	Alonzo W. Dunbar	May 4, 1850	
	William C. Dunham	September 14, 1830	
	Theodore F. Dwight	September 19, 1863	
	Jonathan P. Edwards	April 7, 1854	
	Winslow H. Edwards	August 13, 1870	
	John F. Egan	July 6, 1874	
	Michael L. Eisner	July 30, 1878	
	Eugene F. Endicott	October 14, 1848	
	Wilmot R. Evans Jr.	March 18, 1878	
	Fred A. Ewell	June 12, 1865	
	William Otis Faxon	October 24, 1853	
	Francis Joseph Fennelly	February 18, 1860	
	Jacob Bernard Ferber	May 28, 1876	
	Charles D. B. Fisk	February 17, 1850	
	John Leonard Fiske	August 21, 1872	
	John J. Flaherty	May 5, 1872	
	Daniel L. Flanagan	June 14, 1870	
	Josiah Willard Flint	November 4, 1840	
	Richard Rich Freeman	November 19, 1860	
	Louis A. Frothingham	July 13, 1871	
	Chester E. Gleason	March 13, 1869	
	Ira N. Goddard	March 1, 1830	
	Albert G. Godfrey	August 28, 1855	
	Jeremiah J. Good	May 6, 1865	
	Eben H. Googins	July 28, 1845	
	Robert J. Gove	May 22, 1863	
	Thomas J. Grady	December 16, 1877	
	William P. Grady	November 25, 1878	
	William J. Graham	October 2, 1873	
	John M. Grosvenor Jr.	April 22, 1864	
	John Burgess Gunn	April 13, 1846	
	Alfred Stevens Hall	April 14, 1850	
	Portus B. Hancock	February 19, 1836	
	William E. Hannan	October 26, 1873	
	William Henry Irving Hayes	June 21, 1848	
	George L. Hemenway	November 23, 1850	
	Joseph H. Hibbard	April 5, 1860	
	William Edward Hickey	December 29, 1870	
	Aubrey Hilliard	April 6, 1861	
	Horton H. Hilton	December 11, 1869	
	John A. Holway	March 31, 1865	
	Fred V. Hooke	August 19, 1859	
	Michael B. Houlihan	March 24, 1874	
	William C. Howe	July 15, 1849	
	Frank H. Howe	January 22, 1861	
	Alonzo F. Hoyle	October 16, 1861	
	Augustus Hubbard	June 27, 1849	
	Thomas Huse	1851	
	George H. Jackson	March 9, 1865	
	Lester W. Jenney	April 24, 1876	
	Warren Carlton Jewett	January 28, 1855	
	James Albert Jones	January 14, 1853	
	Samuel O. Jones	November 17, 1858	
	David P. Keefe	September 29, 1855	
	Edward James Kenney	January 19, 1867	
	Alec E. Knowlton	October 29, 1857	
	Joseph J. Leonard	May 8, 1876	
	Henry N. Locklin	March 7, 1853	
	Martin Lomasney	December 3, 1859	
	Fred Wyatt Lord	September 22, 1860	
	James Arnold Lowell	February 5, 1869	
	John B. Lowney	March 17, 1879	
	Robert Luce	December 2, 1862	
	Orion T. Mason	April 4, 1865	
	George Washington Maxon	August 3, 1862	
	Henry Morrill Maxwell	January 21, 1867	
	Charles Mayberry	April 27, 1876	
	Hamilton Mayo	February 26, 1851	
	Matthew McCann	1863	
	James F. McDermott	March 1, 1877	
	Daniel J. McDonald	August 14, 1872	
	John M. McDonald	June 2, 1873	
	James A. McDonald, Jr.	May 19, 1871	
	Edward F. McGrady	January 22, 1874	
	Edwin C. McIntire	October 18, 1867	
	Orlando McKenzie	April 23, 1868	
	Robert K. McKirdy	October 4, 1870	
	Edward L. McManus	December 22, 1866	
	Lewis H. Millett	December 22, 1873	
	John Joseph Mitchell	May 9, 1873	
	Joseph E. Mooney	June 25, 1874	
	George Henry Moore	May 16, 1844	
	Harry Payson Morse	July 27, 1854	
	Francis T. Nelson	November 11, 1851	
	Harry S. Nicoll	December 1, 1858	
	Arthur D. Norcross	November 7, 1848	
	Charles Henry Nowell	October 15, 1843	
	Edward H. O'Brien	February 1, 1874	
	Daniel M. O'Connell	May 30, 1865	
	M. Fred O'Connell	June 14, 1870	
	J. Frank O'Hare	October 14, 1874	
	Hugh O'Rourke	March 1, 1869	
	David M. Owens	January 12, 1877	
	Edwin H. Oxner	1867	
	Frank E. Packard	May 7, 1857	
	Charles William Paradise	May 31, 1857	
	Joseph A. Parks	May 2, 1877	
	Chauncey E. Parsons	November 22, 1847	
	William E. Patrick	May 2, 1847	
	Edward C. Paull	September 5, 1862	
	W. Rodman Peabody	March 3, 1874	
	Pierre F. Peloquin	May 26, 1851	
	Winthrop Edmund Perry	November 6, 1842	
	Michael F. Phelan	October 22, 1875	
	Amos A. Phelps	January 12, 1867	
	Stephen W. Phillips	January 9, 1873	
	Charles S. Pierce	September 5, 1874	
	Mellen A. Pingree	March 9, 1861	
	Noah Allen Plympton	September 7, 1841	
	George M. Poland	July 16, 1877	
	Herbert L. Pollard	September 24, 1844	
	Samuel L. Porter	November 10, 1869	
	Elmer C. Potter	August 23, 1868	
	William H. Potter	April 12, 1850	
	Maurice J. Power	July 21, 1872	
	A. Frederick Putnam	February 10, 1871	
	John H. Quinlan	February 29, 1864	
	John Quinn, Jr.	December 16, 1859	
	Charles H. Reinhart	March 8, 1867	
	Herbert S. Riley	December 20, 1859	
	Reginald L. Robbins	December 5, 1875	
	John G. Robinson	November 24, 1860	
	Samuel Ross	February 2, 1865	
	Gilbert Jones Rugg	March 27, 1836	
	William R. Salter	July 6, 1861	
	George R. Sampson	October 2, 1852	
	George A. Schofield	April 26, 1863	
	Charles Schumaker	March 2, 1867	
	George A. Scigliano	August 26, 1874	
	Frank Seiberlich	October 29, 1874	
	Edward J. Sennott	April 4, 1867	
	Henry Walter Seward	January 18, 1865	
	John F. Sheehan	September 2, 1861	
	Daniel J. Sheehan	August 11, 1857	
	Nelson Sherburne	November 18, 1864	
	Joseph Sherman	September 7, 1840	
	Arthur Wesley Sim	December 21, 1859	
	Mark N. Skerrett	February 23, 1870	
	Edward H. Slater	November 18, 1856	
	Walter C. Slocum	November 18, 1862	
	C. Aylmer Smith	February 15, 1846	
	Charles B. Smith	March 9, 1857	
	Elijah Olin Snow	April 24, 1851	
	Joseph Soliday	1869	
	Nathaniel P. Sowle	October 30, 1857	
	John H. Spinlow	April 7, 1841	
	Samuel O. Staples	April 16, 1843	
	Clarence Winfield Starratt	March 19, 1861	
	George H. Stevens	August 18, 1868	
	Everett J. Stevens	May 11, 1847	
	Elmer A. Stevens	January 15, 1862	
	Luke S. Stowe	August 9, 1834	
	Patrick John Sullivan	August 23, 1860	
	Simon Swig	May 15, 1865	
	Arthur M. Taft	January 28, 1854	
	Edgar V. Tanner	August 28, 1835	
	Frederick H. Tarr	October 8, 1868	
	Frank W. Thayer	July 2, 1865	
	George Henry Thorburn	February 21, 1866	
	Harry L. Timmons	November 12, 1875	
	George A. Titcomb	June 19, 1853	
	Noble B. Turner	November 5, 1848	
	Arthur P. Vinal	June 14, 1854	
	Edward A. Walker	May 28, 1869	
	Joseph Walker	1865	
	Charles E. Ward	October 17, 1849	
	Robert J. Ware	March 15, 1870	
	Edgar W. Warren	October 4, 1853	
	Edmund Weber	March 1, 1871	
	Walter Archibald Webster	December 4, 1875	
	William E. Weeks	1880	
	Arthur J. Wellington	July 21, 1871	
	William E. Westall	January 5, 1853	
	John P. Whalen	November 11, 1878	
	Frank G. Wheatley	July 6, 1851	
	Harvey Wheeler	November 5, 1847	
	Frederick W. Whitcomb	September 7, 1863	
	Frank L. White	August 10, 1869	
	John E. White	December 13, 1873	
	Ezra Scott Whitmarsh	May 29, 1858	
	Isaac E. Willetts	November 8, 1879	
	Thomas W. Williams	September 15, 1865	
	Frederick G. Wooden	May 26, 1871	
	William H. Woodhead	September 17, 1860	
	Allen S. Woodward	December 23, 1850	

== See also ==
- 59th United States Congress
- List of Massachusetts General Courts
