= 1908 Massachusetts legislature =

129th Massachusetts General Court
←	128th	130th	→

Overview
- Legislative body: General Court
- Election: November 5, 1907

Senate
- Members: 40
- President: William D. Chapple
- Party control: Republican (31–9)

House
- Members: 240
- Speaker: John N. Cole
- Party control: Republican (175–65)

Sessions
- 1st: January 1, 1908 – June 13, 1908

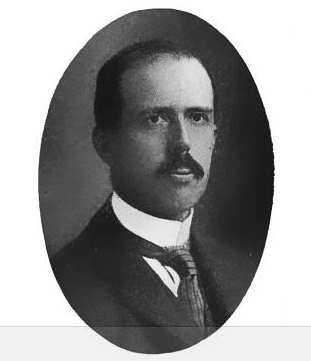
William D. Chapple, Senate president.

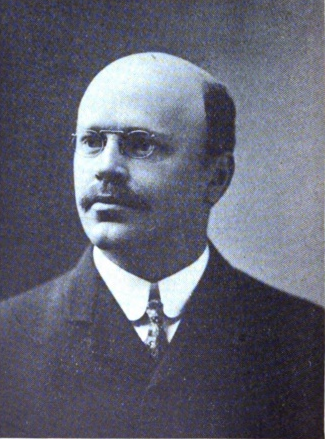
John N. Cole, House speaker.

Leaders of the Massachusetts General Court, 1908.

The 129th Massachusetts General Court, consisting of the Massachusetts Senate and the Massachusetts House of Representatives, met in 1908 during the governorship of Curtis Guild Jr. William D. Chapple served as president of the Senate and John N. Cole served as speaker of the House.

== Senators ==
image	name	date of birth	district
	Gideon B. Abbott		9th Suffolk
	Tilton S. Bell		8th Suffolk
	John J. Butler		7th Suffolk
	William D. Chapple	August 6, 1868	2nd Essex
	Edward A. Cowee		2nd Worcester
	Charles L. Dean		4th Middlesex
	Francke W. Dickinson		1st Hampden
	Edward W. Dixson		3rd Suffolk
	William Otis Faxon		2nd Norfolk
	Charles D. B. Fisk		5th Suffolk
	George J. Gallond		Franklin and Hampshire
	George H. Garfield		2nd Plymouth
	James W. Grimes		7th Middlesex
	Alfred S. Hall		1st Suffolk
	Dennis E. Halley		5th Essex
	Joseph H. Hibbard		8th Middlesex
	Charles F. Jenney		1st Norfolk
	John Lovell Johnson		3rd Worcester
	Eben S. S. Keith		Cape
	Frank J. Linehan		6th Suffolk
	Daniel D. Mahoney		2nd Hampden
	Michael J. McEttrick	June 22, 1848	4th Suffolk
	John Joseph Mitchell	May 9, 1873	5th Middlesex
	George F. Monahan		2nd Suffolk
	Harry P. Morse		4th Essex
	Arthur D. Norcross	November 7, 1848	Worcester and Hampden
	Elmer C. Potter		1st Worcester
	Clinton Q. Richmond		Berkshire
	Herbert S. Riley		6th Middlesex
	William R. Salter		1st Essex
	Winfield S. Schuster		4th Worcester
	James F. Shaw	July 18, 1873	3rd Essex
	Nathaniel P. Sowle	October 30, 1857	3rd Bristol
	Thorndike Spalding		2nd Middlesex
	Elmer A. Stevens	January 15, 1862	3rd Middlesex
	Allen T. Treadway	September 16, 1867	Berkshire, Hampshire and Hampden
	Joseph Turner		2nd Bristol
	James H. Vahey	December 29, 1871	1st Middlesex
	Frank G. Wheatley		1st Plymouth
	Thomas W. Williams		1st Bristol

== Representatives ==
image	name	date of birth	district
	Joseph Abbott	May 22, 1874	25th Suffolk
	Arthur S. Adams	February 14, 1869	16th Essex
	Wallace E. W. N. Arnold	June 29, 1863	
	Frank L. Barnes	August 20, 1864	
	Frank Barrell	July 26, 1853	
	Charles Homer Barrett	June 23, 1868	21st Essex
	Henry B. Barton	May 21, 1853	3rd Franklin
	Frank A. Bayrd		
	Joseph E. Beals	March 18, 1834	
	John C. Bennett	April 2, 1872	4th Hampden
	Fred L. Beunke		
	Elias B. Bishop	August 2, 1869	
	Charles V. Blanchard	February 2, 1866	
	Charles E. Boivin	December 12, 1872	11th Bristol
	Alexis Boyer Jr.	January 17, 1875	
	Bartholomew A. Brickley	May 7, 1883	
	William R. Brooks	March 1, 1865	20th Essex
	Charles H. Brown	January 19, 1879	
	John T. Bryan	February 17, 1859	
	George Bunting	August 31, 1868	5th Essex
	Andrew J. Burnett	1860	
	Alfred S. Burns	February 6, 1860	
	Herbert W. Burr	June 15, 1866	
	Clenric H. Cahoon	February 4, 1875	2nd Barnstable
	Timothy F. Callahan	September 5, 1881	
	James B. Carbrey	January 16, 1854	11th Essex
	Ignatius J. Carleton	August 7, 1866	
	Cornelius J. Carmody	January 11, 1867	
	James Chambers	December 8, 1864	
	William E. Chester		
	John E. Clarey	January 7, 1855	8th Berkshire
	Samuel F. Coffin	December 27, 1851	26th Essex
	David Cole	September 26, 1845	3rd Berkshire
	John N. Cole		9th Essex
	Ellenwood B. Coleman	May 31, 1862	
	Frank Collette Jr.	1871	
	Edward D. Collins	1878	
	James J. Conboy	December 1, 1873	
	Martin F. Conley	April 27, 1870	
	Thomas F. Coogan		
	Benjamin A. Cook		
	John F. Cook	June 24, 1843	10th Essex
	William H. Cook	March 7, 1856	9th Bristol
	William F. Cook	February 4, 1847	2nd Hampden
	Frank O. Coombs	December 17, 1857	1st Bristol
	Rednor P. Coombs	June 27, 1873	
	John S. Cormack	June 7, 1875	13th Essex
	Samuel V. Crane	October 4, 1855	
	Daniel Joseph Curley	December 23, 1875	
	Elmer L. Curtiss	June 11, 1861	
	Grafton D. Cushing	August 4, 1864	
	Alfred L. Cutting	January 27, 1868	
	Ernest Dalton	January 7, 1869	
	Charles L. Davenport	May 4, 1854	
	Ralph Davol		5th Bristol
	Thomas L. Davis	March 15, 1852	17th Essex
	Henry Ellsworth Dean	September 29, 1862	
	Charles A. Dean	March 26, 1856	
	William M. Dean	November 16, 1874	4th Bristol
	Daniel E. Denny	July 14, 1845	
	Joseph C. Desmond	October 15, 1875	7th Bristol
	Joseph E. Donovan	April 21, 1882	
	William E. Dorman	June 23, 1875	12th Essex
	Andrew P. Doyle	August 15, 1869	8th Bristol
	Edward B. Draper	November 27, 1876	
	Florence J. Driscoll	October 15, 1871	
	Hugh P. Drysdale	December 11, 1875	1st Berkshire
	Patrick J. Duane	August 18, 1862	
	S. Alden Eastman	October 14, 1847	
	Charles F. Elmer	August 25, 1856	1st Franklin
	Samuel D. Elmore	December 29, 1868	
	Dennis E. Farley	June 12, 1852	4th Franklin
	Thomas J. Fay	April 24, 1879	
	Francis J. Fennelly	February 18, 1860	10th Bristol
	J. Bernard Ferber	May 28, 1876	
	Frederick L. Fisher		
	Charles J. Flagg		
	Louis E. Flye	January 18, 1881	
	Clarence J. Fogg	July 10, 1853	25th Essex
	Herbert M. Forristall	August 14, 1859	15th Essex
	Herbert S. Frost		
	Edward J. Fuller	January 30, 1854	
	William F. Garcelon	October 24, 1868	
	Joseph S. Gates	October 3, 1856	
	George A. Giles	August 4, 1875	
	Edward Gilmore	January 4, 1867	
	James T. Goggins	January 31, 1866	5th Berkshire
	Thomas J. Grady	December 16, 1877	
	William J. Graham	October 2, 1873	8th Essex
	Hamlet S. Greenwood	1871	
	Lyman W. Griswold	October 16, 1869	2nd Franklin
	Homer A. Hall	November 24, 1871	2nd Berkshire
	Martin T. Hall	December 23, 1877	
	Harry H. Ham		
	Oscar C. Hammarstrom	October 18, 1877	
	Portus B. Hancock	February 19, 1836	
	Bernard F. Hanrahan	July 27, 1875	
	Horace D. Hardy	February 28, 1877	
	John J. Hayes	October 14, 1875	
	Lewis J. Hewitt	February 13, 1870	
	William P. Higgins	May 16, 1881	
	Frederick H. Hilton	February 12, 1882	
	William Hoag	November 18, 1870	
	Ernest E. Hobson	September 29, 1878	1st Hampden
	Frank G. Hodskins	December 26, 1876	7th Hampden
	William M. Hogan	June 2, 1876	
	Samuel M. Holman	1862	1st Bristol
	Charles T. Holt	August 1, 1845	6th Hampden
	Frank A. Hosmer	November 14, 1853	
	Alonzo F. Hoyle	October 16, 1861	
	Eugene Hultman	July 13, 1875	
	George S. J. Hyde	November 1, 1849	7th Essex
	William T. Jeffrey	January 23, 1876	19th Essex
	Charles Cabot Johnson	December 9, 1876	14th Essex
	J. B. Albert Johnson	September 8, 1878	
	Fred O. Johnson	February 10, 1855	
	Aaron F. Jones	September 11, 1832	
	James A. Jones	January 14, 1853	
	Frederick G. Katzmann	September 12, 1875	
	David P. Keefe	September 29, 1855	11th Bristol
	Sidney B. Keene	January 10, 1861	
	Roland M. Keith	March 16, 1847	
	William A. Kelleher	May 27, 1875	6th Essex
	Frank D. Kemp	June 9, 1862	5th Hampden
	Michael J. Kenney	July 12, 1863	3rd Bristol
	James W. Killam	July 12, 1874	
	Edwin M. Kittredge	September 27, 1872	
	James H. Knight	October 11, 1876	
	Frederick S. Lane	May 8, 1849	
	William F. Learned	January 12, 1850	
	Sidney Lees	September 23, 1866	8th Bristol
	Adam Leining	December 4, 1836	
	J. Henry Leonard	September 18, 1879	
	Andrew R. Linscott		
	Martin Lomasney	December 3, 1859	
	George W. Long	July 28, 1872	
	John F. Lothrop	December 17, 1847	
	George E. Lovett	February 27, 1849	
	Robert Luce	December 2, 1862	
	Edward C. Lyford		
	Cornelius J. Lynch	December 18, 1877	
	Samuel J. Madden	May 17, 1882	
	Jens J. Madsen	October 9, 1869	
	Charles A. Malley	January 22, 1876	
	David Mancovitz	August 15, 1877	
	Charles H. Mansfield	March 20, 1842	15th Essex
	Charles Mayberry	April 27, 1876	
	Ulysses E. Mayhew	August 16, 1848	1st Dukes
	Herbert T. Maynard	December 9, 1867	
	Matthew McCann	1863	14th Essex
	Jeremiah F. McCarthy	July 7, 1857	
	Charles F. McCarthy	August 15, 1876	
	Frederick T. McClatchey	October 1, 1873	4th Berkshire
	Thomas P. McDavitt		
	Edward McDonald	July 17, 1844	7th Berkshire
	Philip J. McGonagle	October 21, 1871	
	John F. McGrath	January 10, 1881	
	Edwin C. McIntire	October 18, 1867	23rd Essex
	John H. McKenney	October 12, 1839	13th Essex
	Lewis B. McKie	August 14, 1875	
	George McLane Jr.	July 4, 1869	5th Essex
	Timothy J. Meade	November 7, 1874	
	John F. Meehan	November 24, 1875	
	Julius Meyers	December 6, 1854	
	Samuel H. Mildram		
	Jacob H. Mock	May 14, 1863	
	Fred Moore	April 4, 1874	9th Bristol
	Daniel H. Morgan	January 14, 1879	5th Hampden
	Leslie K. Morse	January 18, 1860	3rd Essex
	Joseph J. Murley	October 8, 1876	
	William F. Murray	September 7, 1881	
	Melvin S. Nash	August 3, 1857	
	Arthur L. Nason	October 24, 1872	4th Essex
	George H. Newhall	October 24, 1850	12th Essex
	Malcolm Nichols	May 8, 1876	
	David Curtis Nickerson	January 21, 1854	
	William H. O'Brien	September 9, 1864	
	J. Frank O'Brien	January 6, 1879	
	M. Fred O'Connell	June 14, 1870	
	Patrick H. O'Connor	1882	
	James E. O'Donnell	September 29, 1875	
	James Oliver	June 28, 1836	
	Lewis C. Parker	May 9, 1880	
	Lewis Parkhurst	1856	
	Joseph A. Parks	May 2, 1877	10th Bristol
	Louis E. Pattison	December 30, 1843	
	Thomas Pattison	January 20, 1854	1st Barnstable
	Edwin C. Perham	March 4, 1858	
	John H. Pickford	September 9, 1849	
	Ernest H. Pierce	May 12, 1863	
	Myron E. Pierce	1874	
	Robert E. Pollock	October 23, 1851	18th Essex
	Frank H. Pope	March 7, 1854	
	Samuel L. Porter	November 10, 1869	1st Essex
	James F. Powers	October 1, 1872	
	Francis X. Quigley	November 20, 1882	
	Thomas P. Riley	July 11, 1875	
	William M. Robinson	July 21, 1875	
	William L. Robinson	December 15, 1855	2nd Bristol
	Samuel Ross	February 2, 1865	7th Bristol
	John E. Rousmaniere		
	Herbert P. Sanders		6th Berkshire
	John H. Schoonmaker	February 14, 1869	
	Edward J. Sennott	April 4, 1867	
	Eugene E. Shaw		
	Frederick M. J. Sheenan		
	Oscar J. Shepardson	December 5, 1851	2nd Hampden
	Joseph J. Shepherd	February 5, 1855	
	Isaac M. Small	1845	3rd Barnstable
	William H. Smith	November 11, 1875	
	Joseph Soliday	1869	
	Harry N. Stearns	October 5, 1874	
	John A. Stoddart	May 10, 1869	22nd Essex
	Lucian B. Stone	September 9, 1829	
	John F. Sullivan	May 17, 1875	
	Daniel L. Sullivan	October 16, 1878	
	George Swann	July 18, 1859	
	John H. Thompson	August 26, 1873	
	Frank P. Todd	March 3, 1853	24th Essex
	Frank A. Torrey	December 21, 1874	
	William H. Trudel	July 19, 1866	2nd Essex
	Charles L. Underhill	July 20, 1867	
	Charles F. Varnum	June 28, 1846	
	Joseph Walker (Massachusetts speaker)	1865	
	Joseph A. Wallis	December 12, 1837	20th Essex
	Thomas S. Walsh	1859	3rd Hampden
	Fred P. Warner		
	Robert M. Washburn	January 4, 1868	
	William L. Waugh		
	A. S. Parker Weeks	April 29, 1857	
	William E. Weeks	1880	
	Joseph O. Wellington		
	Norman H. White	December 25, 1871	
	Edgar H. Whitney		
	William B. Willcutt	December 14, 1874	
	Isaac E. Willetts	November 8, 1879	11th Bristol
	Waterman Lester Williams	August 10, 1867	
	Herbert Wing		6th Bristol
	Russell B. Worster	June 30, 1872	

== See also ==
- 1908 Massachusetts gubernatorial election
- 60th United States Congress
- List of Massachusetts General Courts

== Images ==
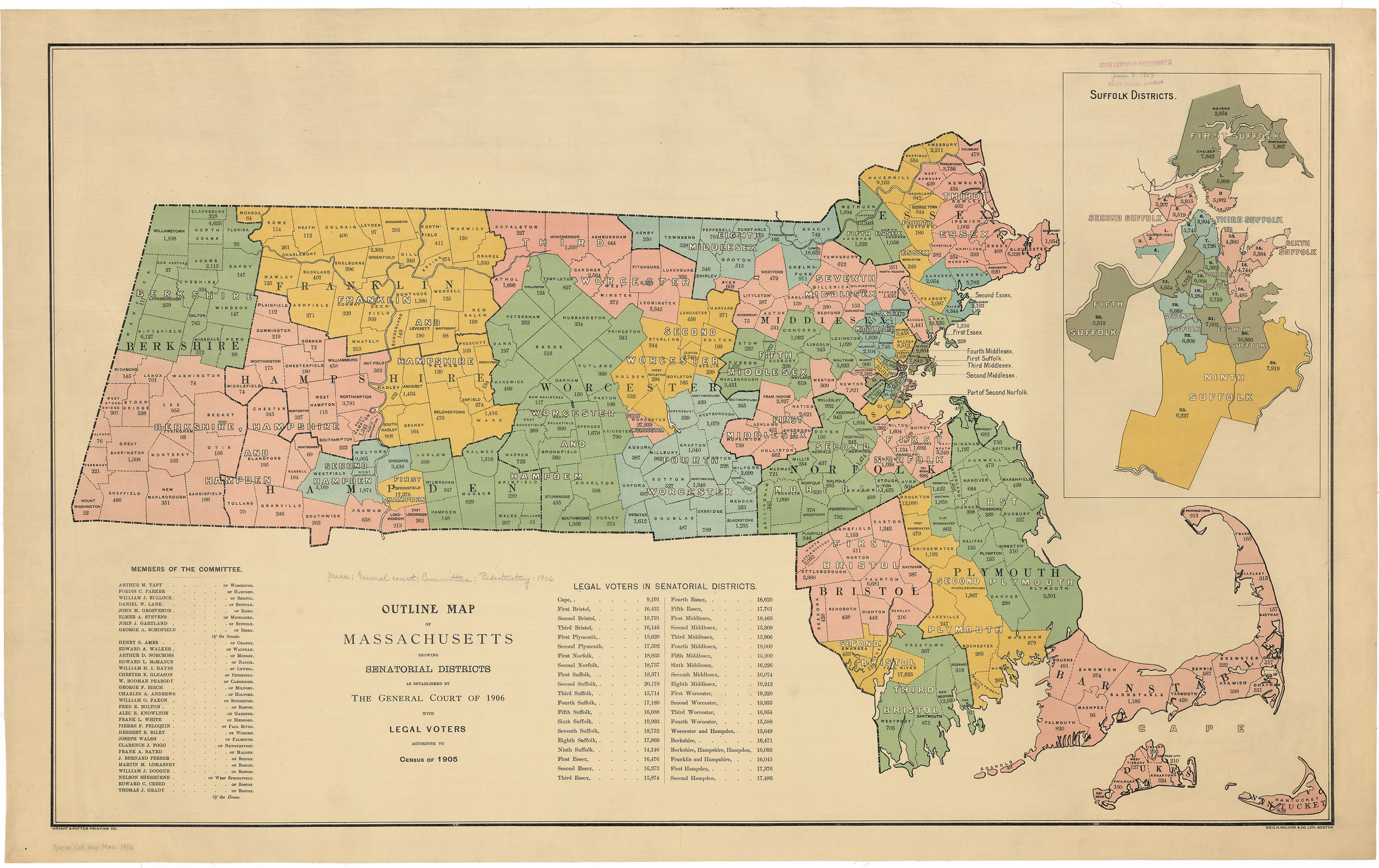
Map of districts of the Massachusetts state senate apportioned in 1906
