= 1907 Massachusetts legislature =

128th Massachusetts General Court
←	127th	129th	→

Overview
- Legislative body: General Court
- Election: November 6, 1906

Senate
- Members: 40
- President: William D. Chapple
- Party control: Republican (28–12)

House
- Members: 240
- Speaker: John N. Cole
- Party control: Republican (173–63–4)

Sessions
- 1st: January 2, 1907 – June 28, 1907

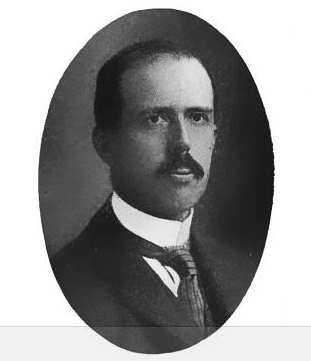
William Chapple, Senate president.

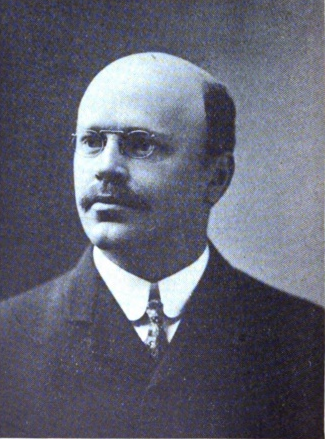
John Cole, House speaker.

Leaders of the Massachusetts General Court, 1907.

The 128th Massachusetts General Court, consisting of the Massachusetts Senate and the Massachusetts House of Representatives, met in 1907 during the governorship of Curtis Guild Jr. William D. Chapple served as president of the Senate and John N. Cole served as speaker of the House.

== Senators ==
image	name	date of birth	district
	Edward J. Bromberg	July 20, 1864	
	William J. Bullock	January 31, 1864	
	Allan G. Buttrick	March 16, 1876	
	Thomas F. Cassidy	June 1, 1875	
	Frank M. Chace	April 16, 1856	
	William D. Chapple	August 6, 1868	
	William W. Clarke	March 10, 1870	
	Guy W. Cox	January 19, 1871	
	Thomas F. Curley	March 22, 1871	
	Charles Leroy Dean	May 29, 1844	
	Edward W. Dixon	November 9, 1846	
	Joseph Donovan	1870	
	William Otis Faxon	October 24, 1853	
	William H. Feiker	March 11, 1870	
	George J. Gallond	October 23, 1852	
	George H. Garfield	July 18, 1858	
	James Wilson Grimes	November 21, 1865	
	Alfred Sigourney Hall	August 27, 1861	
	William P. Hayes	March 27, 1866	
	Charles F. Jenney	September 16, 1860	
	John Lovell Johnson	June 26, 1876	
	Eben S. S. Keith	October 24, 1872	
	Thomas Leavitt	August 28, 1872	
	Frank J. Linehan	January 31, 1870	
	Frederick J. Macleod	June 30, 1870	
	Daniel D. Mahoney	March 27, 1862	
	John J. McManmon	April 5, 1871	
	James J. Mellen	March 30, 1875	
	John Joseph Mitchell	May 9, 1873	
	Harry Payson Morse	July 27, 1854	
	Charles N. Prouty	October 6, 1842	
	Herbert S. Riley	December 20, 1859	
	William R. Salter	July 6, 1861	
	Winfield S. Schuster	December 29, 1855	
	James F. Shaw	July 18, 1873	
	Elmer A. Stevens	January 15, 1862	
	Arthur M. Taft	January 28, 1854	
	James H. Vahey	December 29, 1871	
	Frank G. Wheatley	July 6, 1851	
	Thomas W. Williams	September 15, 1865	

== Representatives ==
image	name	date of birth	district
	Gideon B. Abbott	May 4, 1874	
	James Sidney Allen	July 3, 1831	
	Manuel Andrew	February 10, 1876	
	Alvin F. Bailey	May 25, 1840	
	Lorenzo D. Baker, Jr.	September 5, 1863	
	Arthur Wesley Barker	September 19, 1847	
	Frank A. Bayrd	September 1, 1873	
	Joseph Eber Beals	March 18, 1834	
	John Cunningham Bennett	April 2, 1872	
	March G. Bennett	January 31, 1869	
	Frederick Leonard Beunke	June 15, 1856	
	George Frederick Birch	April 12, 1848	
	Elias B. Bishop	August 2, 1869	
	Charles Bishop Blair	April 10, 1852	
	Charles V. Blanchard	February 2, 1866	
	George H. Blodgett	July 29, 1862	
	G. Arthur Bodwell	July 4, 1859	
	Charles E. Boivin	December 12, 1872	
	Fred Eldridge Bolton	December 6, 1869	
	Alexis Boyer Jr.	January 17, 1875	
	William M. Brigham	January 23, 1864	
	Deloss M. Bristol	December 25, 1851	
	Charles Howard Brown	January 19, 1879	
	James H. Bryan	May 12, 1842	
	Timothy J. Buckley	April 24, 1870	
	George Bunting	August 31, 1868	
	Andrew J. Burnett	1860	
	Alfred S. Burns	February 6, 1860	
	Clenric H. Cahoon	February 4, 1875	
	Timothy Francis Callahan	September 5, 1881	
	James B. Carbrey	January 16, 1854	
	James Chambers	December 8, 1864	
	William E. Chester	April 4, 1865	
	Ezra W. Clark	October 12, 1842	
	Henry S. Clark	January 5, 1858	
	Samuel F. Coffin	December 27, 1851	
	John N. Cole	November 4, 1863	
	Ellenwood B. Coleman	May 31, 1862	
	Frank Collette	1871	
	James J. Conboy	December 1, 1873	
	Martin F. Conley	April 27, 1870	
	Atherton D. Converse	January 7, 1877	
	John Joseph Conway	September 2, 1874	
	John Francis Cook	June 24, 1843	
	William H. Cook	March 7, 1856	
	William F. Cook	February 4, 1847	
	Calvin Coolidge	July 4, 1872	
	Frank O. Coombs	December 17, 1857	
	Michael J. Coyle	September 27, 1864	
	Daniel Joseph Curley	December 23, 1875	
	Grafton D. Cushing	August 4, 1864	
	Francis O. Dahlquist	June 4, 1848	
	Ernest Dalton	January 7, 1869	
	Charles L. Davenport	May 4, 1854	
	Thomas L. Davis	March 15, 1852	
	Henry Ellsworth Dean	September 29, 1862	
	Charles Austin Dean	March 26, 1856	
	William M. Dean	November 16, 1874	
	Robert T. Delano	July 13, 1857	
	Charles Edwin Dennett	November 13, 1837	
	Daniel Edward Denny	July 14, 1845	
	Thomas J. Dillon	April 20, 1869	
	William E. Dorman	June 23, 1875	
	Andrew P. Doyle	August 15, 1869	
	Edward B. Draper	November 27, 1876	
	Florence J. Driscoll	October 15, 1871	
	John J. Driscoll	March 27, 1876	
	Thomas F. Driscoll	November 5, 1860	
	Hugh P. Drysdale	December 11, 1875	
	Patrick J. Duane	August 18, 1862	
	Ebenezer Alden Dyer	July 17, 1857	
	Michael J. Eagan	June 17, 1874	
	Charles Fremont Elmer	August 25, 1856	
	Samuel D. Elmore	December 29, 1868	
	Oscar H. Ewing	August 15, 1876	
	Dennis Eugene Farley	June 12, 1852	
	Thomas J. Fay	April 24, 1879	
	Francis Joseph Fennelly	February 18, 1860	
	Jacob Bernard Ferber	May 28, 1876	
	Fredrick L. Fisher	January 29, 1862	
	Charles D. B. Fisk	February 17, 1850	
	Michael Henry Fitzgerald	October 1, 1871	
	Louis E. Flye	January 18, 1881	
	Clarence J. Fogg	July 10, 1853	
	Herbert M. Forristall	August 14, 1859	
	Edward J. Fuller	January 30, 1854	
	William F. Garcelon	October 24, 1868	
	Leonard T. Gaskill	January 3, 1843	
	Joseph A. Gauthier	August 16, 1878	
	George A. Giles	August 4, 1875	
	Edward Gilmore	January 4, 1867	
	Frank W. Goodwin	October 25, 1876	
	Thomas J. Grady	December 16, 1877	
	William J. Graham	October 2, 1873	
	Albert F. Grant	November 16, 1872	
	George D. Green	July 11, 1846	
	Lyman W. Griswold	October 16, 1869	
	James A. Gunn	September 3, 1848	
	William F. Haggerty	June 26, 1872	
	Martin Thomas Hall	December 23, 1877	
	Harry H. Ham	March 16, 1883	
	Portus B. Hancock	February 19, 1836	
	Horace D. Hardy	February 28, 1877	
	William Henry Irving Hayes	June 21, 1848	
	Andrew F. Healy	July 20, 1878	
	John J. Higgins	May 17, 1865	
	Thomas F. Higgins	October 2, 1880	
	William P. Higgins	May 16, 1881	
	William Hoag	November 18, 1870	
	Ernest Emery Hobson	September 29, 1878	
	Frank G. Hodskins	December 26, 1876	
	William M. Hogan	June 2, 1876	
	Samuel M. Holman	1862	
	Charles T. Holt	August 1, 1845	
	Barker B. Howard	April 21, 1867	
	Alonzo F. Hoyle	October 16, 1861	
	Eugene Hultman	July 13, 1875	
	George S. J. Hyde	November 1, 1849	
	Charles Cabot Johnson	December 9, 1876	
	Fred O. Johnson	February 10, 1855	
	James Albert Jones	January 14, 1853	
	Frederick G. Katzmann	September 12, 1875	
	David P. Keefe	September 29, 1855	
	Sidney B. Keene	January 10, 1861	
	Roland Manning Keith	March 16, 1847	
	William A. Kelleher	May 27, 1875	
	Frank D. Kemp	June 9, 1862	
	Michael J. Kenney	July 12, 1863	
	Clesson Kenney	May 31, 1839	
	Philip A. Kiely	February 16, 1874	
	S. John Lamoureux	April 30, 1877	
	William F. Learned	January 12, 1850	
	Adam Leining	December 4, 1836	
	Edwin F. Leonard	July 15, 1862	
	John B. Lewis, Jr.	August 30, 1841	
	Andrew R. Linscott	March 6, 1844	
	Martin Lomasney	December 3, 1859	
	George W. Long	July 28, 1872	
	Hiram W. Loring	October 11, 1842	
	John Fitch Lothrop	December 17, 1847	
	Robert Luce	December 2, 1862	
	Darwin E. Lyman	July 26, 1846	
	William J. Lyons	September 25, 1877	
	Charles H. Macomber	August 6, 1872	
	Charles Addison Malley	January 22, 1876	
	Harry E. Mapes	July 8, 1867	
	John H. Marcy	January 23, 1867	
	Charles Mayberry	April 27, 1876	
	Ulysses Everett Mayhew	August 16, 1848	
	Matthew McCann	1863	
	Daniel J. McCarthy	March 6, 1876	
	Daniel J. McDonald	August 14, 1872	
	John M. McDonald	June 2, 1873	
	Michael J. McEttrick	June 22, 1848	
	Philip J. McGonagle	October 21, 1871	
	John F. McGrath	January 10, 1881	
	John H. McKenney	October 12, 1839	
	Lewis B. McKie	August 14, 1875	
	Robert K. McKirdy	October 4, 1870	
	Edwin T. McKnight	October 11, 1869	
	John F. Meehan	November 24, 1875	
	Julius Meyers	December 6, 1854	
	Samuel H. Mildram	December 4, 1867	
	Jacob H. Mock	May 14, 1863	
	Daniel H. Morgan	January 14, 1879	
	Leslie K. Morse	January 18, 1860	
	Emil J. Muehlig	November 26, 1873	
	Joseph J. Murley	October 8, 1876	
	William F. Murray, Jr.	September 7, 1881	
	Melvin S. Nash	August 3, 1857	
	Arthur L. Nason	October 24, 1872	
	George H. Newhall	October 24, 1850	
	William L. V. Newton	February 28, 1881	
	Malcolm Nichols	May 8, 1876	
	David Curtis Nickerson	January 21, 1854	
	Edward H. O'Brien	February 1, 1874	
	M. Fred O'Connell	June 14, 1870	
	Patrick H. O'Connor	1882	
	Hugh O'Rourke	March 1, 1869	
	James Oliver	June 28, 1836	
	Charles William Paradise	May 31, 1857	
	Ralph Tappan Parker	September 28, 1876	
	Joseph A. Parks	May 2, 1877	
	Albion F. Parmenter	May 19, 1862	
	Thomas Pattison	January 20, 1854	
	Edwin C. Perham	March 4, 1858	
	John H. Pickford	September 9, 1849	
	Ernest H. Pierce	May 12, 1863	
	Robert E. Pollock	October 23, 1851	
	Samuel L. Porter	November 10, 1869	
	Elmer C. Potter	August 23, 1868	
	William J. Potter	April 20, 1859	
	James F. Powers	October 1, 1872	
	John F. Prindle	September 15, 1851	
	Melvin B. Putnam	April 8, 1845	
	John Quinn, Jr.	December 16, 1859	
	Henry F. Rice	January 29, 1844	
	William M. Robinson	July 21, 1875	
	William L. Robinson	December 15, 1855	
	Bradley M. Rockwood	May 24, 1862	
	Samuel Ross	February 2, 1865	
	Hezekiah S. Russell	December 7, 1835	
	Edward Julius Sandberg	October 21, 1866	
	Henry O. Sawyer	June 10, 1844	
	John H. Schoonmaker	February 14, 1869	
	Charles H. Shaylor	December 24, 1861	
	Joseph J. Shepherd	February 5, 1855	
	William H. Smith	November 11, 1875	
	Joseph Soliday	1869	
	Nathaniel P. Sowle	October 30, 1857	
	Waldo Spaulding	March 29, 1845	
	Harry N. Stearns	October 5, 1874	
	John Adam Stoddart	May 10, 1869	
	Lucian B. Stone	September 9, 1829	
	Arthur H. Streeter	July 4, 1870	
	John F. Sullivan	May 17, 1875	
	Daniel L. Sullivan	October 16, 1878	
	Henry F. Taber	April 15, 1860	
	Richard S. Teeling	December 26, 1878	
	Clifford B. Terry	December 16, 1876	
	John Hugh Toland	October 8, 1870	
	William H. Trudel	July 19, 1866	
	Fred F. Trull	February 11, 1856	
	Joseph Turner	March 23, 1852	
	William Turtle	June 20, 1855	
	Charles F. Varnum	June 28, 1846	
	Albert Vittum	December 29, 1857	
	Joseph Walker	1865	
	William L. Waugh	October 11, 1864	
	Walter Archibald Webster	December 4, 1875	
	William E. Weeks	1880	
	A. S. Parker Weeks	April 29, 1857	
	Joseph O. Wellington	June 22, 1850	
	William E. Westall	January 5, 1853	
	Norman H. White	December 25, 1871	
	Charles J. Wier	February 24, 1868	
	Harry N. Winch	October 8, 1868	
	Wilbur A. Wood	February 4, 1865	
	Russell B. Worster	June 30, 1872	
	Alvin L. Wright	October 28, 1857	

== See also ==
- 60th United States Congress
- List of Massachusetts General Courts
