= 1904 Massachusetts legislature =

125th Massachusetts General Court
←	124th	126th	→

Overview
- Legislative body: General Court
- Election: November 3, 1903

Senate
- Members: 40
- President: George R. Jones
- Party control: Republican (31–9)

House
- Members: 240
- Speaker: Louis A. Frothingham
- Party control: Republican (154–85–1)

Sessions
- 1st: January 6, 1904 – June 9, 1904

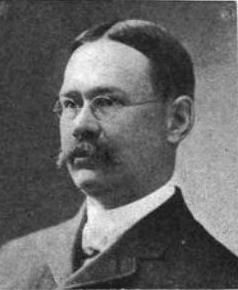
George Jones, Senate president.

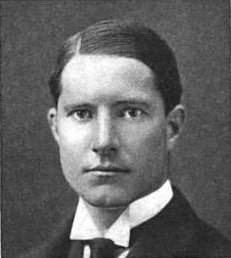
Louis Frothingham, House speaker.

Leaders of the Massachusetts General Court, 1904.

The 125th Massachusetts General Court, consisting of the Massachusetts Senate and the Massachusetts House of Representatives, met in 1904 during the governorship of John L. Bates. George R. Jones served as president of the Senate and Louis A. Frothingham served as speaker of the House.

== Senators ==
District	Portrait	Senator	Party	Born
Middlesex and Essex		Francis H. Appleton	Republican	June 17, 1847
First Suffolk		A. Dudley Bagley	Republican	February 27, 1869
Second Norfolk		Albion F. Bemis	Republican	July 19, 1856
First Norfolk		Albert A. Brackett	Republican	December 5, 1850
Third Bristol		William J. Bullock	Republican	January 31, 1864
Seventh Suffolk		Edward B. Callender	Republican	February 23, 1851
Second Bristol		Frank M. Chace	Republican	April 16, 1856
Fourth Worcester		Alvin B. Chamberlain	Republican	December 16, 1842
Sixth Middlesex		Chester W. Clark	Republican	August 9, 1851
Second Essex		Samuel Cole	Republican	December 15, 1856
First Essex		William F. Craig	Republican	September 15, 1866
First Middlesex		William F. Dana	Republican	June 26, 1863
Second Hampden		Thomas J. Dillon	Republican	April 20, 1869
Third Suffolk		Henry S. Fitzgerald	Democratic	October 24, 1875
Fifth Essex		Joseph J. Flynn	Democratic	May 1, 1862
Fourth Suffolk		John J. Gartland	Democratic	November 27, 1871
First Bristol		George N. Goff	Republican	July 24, 1837
Fifth Middlesex		Otis M. Gove	Republican	May 3, 1851
First Plymouth		Elisha T. Harvell	Republican	December 18, 1841
First Worcester		Frank M. Heath	Republican	September 8, 1852
Fourth Essex		Carleton F. How	Republican	April 20, 1863
Fourth Middlesex		George R. Jones	Republican	February 8, 1862
Berkshire and Hampshire		Loren P. Keyes	Republican	January 6, 1838
Third Essex		Moody Kimball	Republican	July 2, 1862
Ninth Suffolk		Daniel W. Lane	Republican	December 11, 1871
Fifth Suffolk		David Dennis Leahy	Democratic	April 15, 1876
Berkshire		William H. MacInnis	Democratic	November 22, 1861
Sixth Suffolk		Daniel V. McIsaac	Democratic	November 6, 1871
Seventh Middlesex		James H. McKinley	Republican	May 21, 1860
Second Worcester		John P. Munroe	Republican	June 28, 1850
Franklin and Hampshire		Herbert Newell	Republican	April 2, 1855
Cape		William A. Nye	Republican	May 26, 1850
Fifth Worcester		Edward L. Osgood	Republican	August 6, 1844
Eighth Suffolk		Andrew James Peters	Democratic	April 3, 1872
Second Plymouth		David G. Pratt	Republican	November 7, 1848
Second Middlesex		William J. Rounds	Republican	June 24, 1855
First Hampden		Henry F. Sampson	Republican	May 12, 1835
Second Suffolk		Charles S. Sullivan	Democratic	June 29, 1875
Third Worcester		George R. Wallace	Republican	June 20, 1859
Third Middlesex		John M. Woods	Republican	August 18, 1839

== Representatives ==
image	name	date of birth	district
	Cecil L. Adams	June 14, 1878	
	William Leck Adams	October 24, 1852	
	Frank Brinton Allen	December 5, 1859	
	Franklin B. Allen	June 29, 1869	
	James Sidney Allen	July 3, 1831	
	Henry Stoddard Ames	May 21, 1861	
	Charles A. Andrews	July 2, 1872	
	Adelbert S. Atherton	October 13, 1850	
	James F. Aylward	August 4, 1862	
	George O. Baker	April 6, 1835	
	William Selby Bamford	August 11, 1864	
	George L. Barnes	June 24, 1879	
	George H. Battis	1863	
	Fred Alfred Bearse	February 15, 1871	
	Frank P. Bennett Jr.	December 30, 1878	
	March G. Bennett	January 31, 1869	
	John Williston Blaney	September 18, 1841	
	Ernest Linwood Bonney	June 23, 1864	
	Manassah Edward Bradley	August 15, 1863	
	Edward H. Brewer	December 12, 1851	
	Elisha Hume Brewster	September 10, 1871	
	William M. Brigham	January 23, 1864	
	Henry W. Brown	October 14, 1856	
	William A. Burns	January 9, 1875	
	John J. Butler	June 7, 1865	
	Allan G. Buttrick	March 16, 1876	
	Harry Hammond Buxbaum	January 19, 1879	
	Robert D. Cadagon	June 6, 1870	
	George H. Cadigan	February 22, 1873	
	John J. Cahill	September 27, 1865	
	Edward C. Callahan	March 14, 1874	
	Edwin J. Castle	April 15, 1853	
	Alfred M. Chaffee	August 16, 1859	
	Sumner A. Chapman	May 30, 1874	
	James W. Chrystal	March 24, 1876	
	Allen Clark	April 1, 1870	
	Edward E. Clark	November 4, 1870	
	James Colby Dorr Clark	June 10, 1872	
	Luther W. Clark	September 19, 1851	
	William W. Clarke	March 10, 1870	
	John N. Cole	November 4, 1863	
	Thomas J. Collins	October 28, 1868	
	William H. Cook	March 7, 1856	
	William H. Coolidge	November 6, 1856	
	John A. Coulthurst	June 24, 1871	
	Guy W. Cox	January 19, 1871	
	William H. Cuddy	August 7, 1865	
	Thomas F. Curley	March 22, 1871	
	Michael F. Curran	November 30, 1875	
	William H. Cushman	June 8, 1850	
	Samuel Newton Cutler	January 25, 1855	
	Charles L. Davenport	May 4, 1854	
	Charles S. Davis	1858	
	Thomas L. Davis	March 15, 1852	
	Frederick Simpson Deitrick	April 9, 1875	
	Daniel J. Dempsey	June 8, 1866	
	Francis J. Doherty	August 26, 1875	
	J. Frank Donahue	August 29, 1865	
	Thomas Donahue	August 20, 1853	
	Daniel J. Donnelly	October 13, 1868	
	George H. Doty	May 9, 1861	
	Thomas Dowd	May 1, 1864	
	Horace Rogers Drinkwater	May 28, 1872	
	Alonzo W. Dunbar	May 4, 1850	
	William A. Edson	April 22, 1862	
	John F. Egan	July 6, 1874	
	William A. Fahey	July 26, 1875	
	Lowell Ethan Fales	September 28, 1858	
	Peter T. Fallon	July 16, 1856	
	Dennis H. Finn	April 2, 1870	
	Michael FitzGerald	September 29, 1869	
	Daniel L. Flanagan	June 14, 1870	
	Richard H. Foley	June 16, 1867	
	Richard Rich Freeman	November 19, 1860	
	Louis A. Frothingham	July 13, 1871	
	Charles B. Gardiner	June 19, 1849	
	Arthur H. Gardner	August 4, 1854	
	George H. Garfield	July 18, 1858	
	Guy W. Garland	December 11, 1844	
	Julius Garst	December 12, 1855	
	Julius K. Gates	October 9, 1833	
	Arthur L. Gavin	June 11, 1876	
	Charles Giddings	May 10, 1867	
	Albert G. Godfrey	August 28, 1855	
	Jeremiah J. Good	May 6, 1865	
	Eben H. Googins	July 28, 1845	
	Charles H. Goulding	March 24, 1838	
	William H. Gove (see Mass.	September 4, 1851	
	Thomas J. Grady	December 16, 1877	
	William J. Graham	October 2, 1873	
	Harry E. Graves	May 17, 1876	
	Francis Xavier Greenwood	January 31, 1851	
	John M. Grosvenor Jr.	April 22, 1864	
	Alfred Sigourney Hall	August 27, 1861	
	Alfred Stevens Hall	April 14, 1850	
	Guy Andrews Ham	July 8, 1878	
	William E. Hannan	October 26, 1873	
	Robert J. Harrington	January 24, 1875	
	Michael F. Hart	September 22, 1873	
	George H. Hartford	March 3, 1852	
	George A. Hastings	April 8, 1865	
	William Henry Irving Hayes	June 21, 1848	
	William C. S. Healey	September 26, 1873	
	Thomas F. Hederman	March 4, 1873	
	William Edward Hickey	December 29, 1870	
	Sidney Adelvin Hill	August 26, 1849	
	Horton H. Hilton	December 11, 1869	
	Fred V. Hooke	August 19, 1859	
	Franklin K. Hooper	February 2, 1849	
	Michael B. Houlihan	March 24, 1874	
	Augustus Hubbard	June 27, 1849	
	George C. Hunt	April 7, 1859	
	Jeremiah J. Hurley	December 24, 1873	
	John C. Hurley	December 19, 1875	
	Thomas Huse	1851	
	George H. Jackson	March 9, 1865	
	Warren Carlton Jewett	January 28, 1855	
	David P. Keefe	September 29, 1855	
	Jeremiah J. Kelley	March 25, 1863	
	William A. Kelley	April 27, 1868	
	James M. Lane	December 1, 1872	
	Henry F. Lehan	September 16, 1874	
	Eben F. Leonard	July 25, 1845	
	Joseph J. Leonard	May 8, 1876	
	Frank J. Linehan	January 31, 1870	
	Henry N. Locklin	March 7, 1853	
	Fred Wyatt Lord	September 22, 1860	
	James Arnold Lowell	February 5, 1869	
	John B. Lowney	March 17, 1879	
	Robert Luce	December 2, 1862	
	George H. Lyon	April 2, 1849	
	William Frederick Maintien	December 31, 1863	
	Hamilton Mayo	February 26, 1851	
	Matthew McCann	1863	
	Edwin C. McIntire	October 18, 1867	
	John J. McManmon	April 5, 1871	
	Edward L. McManus	December 22, 1866	
	James J. Mellen	March 30, 1875	
	Lewis H. Millett	December 22, 1873	
	John Joseph Mitchell	May 9, 1873	
	David A. Monroe	February 5, 1867	
	George Henry Moore	May 16, 1844	
	Harry Payson Morse	July 27, 1854	
	Harold P. Moseley	November 13, 1871	
	Otto Mueller	April 24, 1867	
	J. Howard Nason	November 18, 1842	
	John S. Nason	May 6, 1860	
	Asa T. Newhall	December 23, 1850	
	H. Huestis Newton	December 2, 1860	
	Arthur D. Norcross	November 7, 1848	
	Charles Henry Nowell	October 15, 1843	
	Daniel J. O'Brien	October 5, 1873	
	Edward H. O'Brien	February 1, 1874	
	Daniel M. O'Connell	May 30, 1865	
	Hugh O'Rourke	March 1, 1869	
	Charles Torrey Oldfield	April 7, 1843	
	David M. Owens	January 12, 1877	
	Edward C. Packard	October 14, 1847	
	James Breckenridge Paige	December 28, 1861	
	Fordis C. Parker	January 3, 1868	
	Joseph A. Parks	May 2, 1877	
	Thomas Pattison	January 20, 1854	
	Edward C. Paull	September 5, 1862	
	W. Rodman Peabody	March 3, 1874	
	Pierre F. Peloquin	May 26, 1851	
	Winthrop Edmund Perry	November 6, 1842	
	Charles S. Pierce	September 5, 1874	
	John J. Pinder	June 15, 1878	
	Mellen A. Pingree	March 9, 1861	
	Henry L. Plummer	November 17, 1866	
	George M. Poland	July 16, 1877	
	Samuel L. Porter	November 10, 1869	
	Elmer C. Potter	August 23, 1868	
	William H. Potter	April 12, 1850	
	Maurice J. Power	July 21, 1872	
	John H. Quinlan	February 29, 1864	
	John Quinn, Jr.	December 16, 1859	
	Wallace C. Ransden	November 1, 1853	
	Charles H. Reinhart	March 8, 1867	
	Evan F. Richardson	March 9, 1867	
	Herbert S. Riley	December 20, 1859	
	Reginald L. Robbins	December 5, 1875	
	John G. Robinson	November 24, 1860	
	Joseph L. Rogers	August 2, 1864	
	Samuel Ross	February 2, 1865	
	Thomas Bradford Rounds	April 2, 1853	
	William R. Salter	July 6, 1861	
	George R. Sampson	October 2, 1852	
	George A. Schofield	April 26, 1863	
	Charles Schumaker	March 2, 1867	
	George A. Scigliano	August 26, 1874	
	Frank Seiberlich	October 29, 1874	
	Edward J. Sennott	April 4, 1867	
	Henry Walter Seward	January 18, 1865	
	John F. Sheehan	September 2, 1861	
	Nelson Sherburne	November 18, 1864	
	Patrick J. Shiels	August 9, 1873	
	Mark N. Skerrett	February 23, 1870	
	C. Aylmer Smith	February 15, 1846	
	Gurdon Southworth	March 27, 1846	
	Nathaniel P. Sowle	October 30, 1857	
	Samuel O. Staples	April 16, 1843	
	Clarence Winfield Starratt	March 19, 1861	
	Elmer A. Stevens	January 15, 1862	
	Everett J. Stevens	May 11, 1847	
	Edward Carleton Stone	June 29, 1878	
	Luke S. Stowe	August 9, 1834	
	Arthur M. Taft	January 28, 1854	
	Edgar V. Tanner	August 28, 1835	
	Frederick H. Tarr	October 8, 1868	
	William C. Temple	August 15, 1861	
	Herbert W. Thayer	May 7, 1858	
	George Henry Thorburn	February 21, 1866	
	Harry L. Timmons	November 12, 1875	
	George A. Titcomb	June 19, 1853	
	Allen T. Treadway	September 16, 1867	
	George A. Turner	June 4, 1857	
	Samuel Willard Tyler	February 11, 1866	
	Arthur P. Vinal	June 14, 1854	
	Thomas Melville Vinson	April 27, 1868	
	Edward A. Walker	May 28, 1869	
	Joseph Walker	July 13, 1865	
	William H. Walker	November 30, 1857	
	Charles E. Ward	October 17, 1849	
	Peter F. Ward	January 16, 1877	
	Edgar W. Warren	October 4, 1853	
	Henry Endicott Weatherbee	August 24, 1862	
	Edmund Weber	March 1, 1871	
	Fred Olvin Welsh	April 4, 1852	
	William E. Westall	January 5, 1853	
	Frank G. Wheatley	July 6, 1851	
	Harvey Wheeler	November 5, 1847	
	Frederick W. Whitcomb	September 7, 1863	
	Charles H. Winslow	May 22, 1866	
	William H. Woodhead	September 17, 1860	
	William H. Woods	August 7, 1860	
	Allen S. Woodward	December 23, 1850	

== See also ==
- 58th United States Congress
- List of Massachusetts General Courts
