= Senator Norcross =

Senator Norcross may refer to:

- Amasa Norcross (1824–1898), Massachusetts State Senate
- Arthur D. Norcross (1848–1916), Massachusetts State Senate
- Donald Norcross (born 1958), New Jersey State Senate
