= Harold P. Williams =

American judge (1882–1965)

Associate Justice of the Massachusetts Supreme Judicial Court
- In office 1947–1962
- Preceded by: Stanley Elroy Qua
- Succeeded by: Paul Reardon

United States Attorney for the District of Massachusetts
- In office 1925–1926
- Preceded by: Robert O. Harris
- Succeeded by: Frederick H. Tarr

District Attorney for the Southeastern District
- In office 1923–1925
- Preceded by: Frederick G. Katzmann
- Succeeded by: Winfield W. Wilbar

Personal details
- Born: October 2, 1882 Foxboro, Massachusetts
- Died: August 6, 1965 (aged 82) Boston, Massachusetts, U.S.
- Resting place: Walnut Hills Cemetery; Brookline, Massachusetts
- Spouse: Mary Harriet Culp
- Education: Harvard College; Harvard Law School
- Occupation: Attorney; Judge

Harold Putnam Williams (October 2, 1882 – August 6, 1965) was an American attorney and judge who served as the United States Attorney for the District of Massachusetts from 1925 to 1926 and as an associate justice of the Massachusetts Supreme Judicial Court from 1947 to 1962.

== Early life ==
Williams was born on October 2, 1882, in Foxborough, Massachusetts, to Fred H. Williams, a lawyer and member of the Massachusetts General Court, and Julia Annette (Blake) Williams. Williams grew up in Foxboro and Brookline, Massachusetts. He graduated from Brookline High School in 1899, Harvard College in 1903, and Harvard Law School in 1906.

== Attorney ==
Williams began his legal career as a lawyer with Walter I. Badger in Boston. He then went to work with his father.

In 1918, Williams was appointed Assistant District Attorney for the Southeastern District (consisting of Norfolk and Plymouth Counties). In this role he assisted District Attorney Frederick G. Katzmann in the prosecution of Ferdinando Sacco and Bartolomeo Vanzetti. In 1922 he was elected District Attorney.

In December 1924 Williams was appointed United States Attorney for the District of Massachusetts by President Calvin Coolidge. Williams' appointment satisfied both Wets and dries as the drys felt that he would enforce the prohibition laws and the wets supported his confirmation because he was not endorsed by the Anti-Saloon League.

== Judge ==
Williams resigned as U.S. Attorney in 1926 after he was appointed Associate Justice of the Massachusetts Superior Court. He presided over the Oliver Garrett and John W. Lyons criminal cases and the Medford Trust Company's lawsuit against Edwin T. McKnight. He remained on the Superior Court until August 13, 1947, when he was appointed by Governor Robert F. Bradford to serve on the Massachusetts Supreme Judicial Court.

== Personal life ==
On September 9, 1911, Williams married Mary Harriet Culp of Brooklyn, Connecticut. They had one son, Harold P. Williams, Jr. The family resided in Brookline for many years before moving to the Hotel Puritan in Boston.

Williams served in many offices in Brookline including Town Moderator and member of the Board of Trustees of the Public Library.

Williams was a member of the Congregational church, the freemasons, the American Law Institute, the Massachusetts Bar Association, Sigma Alpha Epsilon, the Harvard Club of Boston, the Union Club of Boston, the Brae Burn Country Club, and the Grange. His hobbies included golf and traveling.

== Death ==
Williams died on August 6, 1965 at the Hahnemann Hospital in Boston after a long illness.

Legal offices
Preceded by Stanley Elroy Qua	Associate Justice of the Massachusetts Supreme Judicial Court; 1947-1962	Succeeded by Paul Reardon
