= Frank O. Hardy =

American politician (1870–1920)

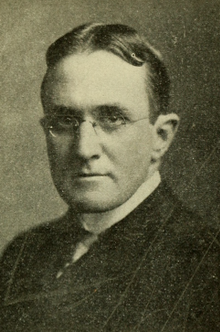
- Hardy as a member of the Massachusetts House of Representatives

Mayor of Fitchburg, Massachusetts
- In office 1912–1914
- Preceded by: M. Fred O'Connell
- Succeeded by: Benjamin A. Cook

Member of the Massachusetts House of Representatives from the 12th Worcester District
- In office 1909–1911

Personal details
- Born: September 13, 1870 Fitchburg, Massachusetts, U.S.
- Died: March 8, 1920 (aged 49)
- Party: Republican

Frank O. Hardy (September 13, 1870 – March 8, 1920) was an American politician who was a member of the Massachusetts House of Representatives from 1909 to 1911 and mayor of Fitchburg, Massachusetts from 1912 to 1914.

== Early life ==
Hardy was born in Fitchburg on September 13, 1870. He graduated from Fitchburg High School and followed his father into the brass foundry business. He became treasurer of the W. A. Hardy & Sons Company when it was incorporated on December 15, 1902.

== Politics ==
Hardy was a member of the Fitchburg board of aldermen in 1908. From 1909 to 1911, he represented the 12th Worcester district in the Massachusetts House of Representatives. He was the citizen's party candidate in the 1911 Fitchburg mayoral election and defeated incumbent M. Fred O'Connell by 276 votes. He was reelected in 1912 over former mayor Charles H. Blood 3,099 votes to 1,823.
