= George W. Jackman Jr. =

American shipbuilder and politician (1814–1895)

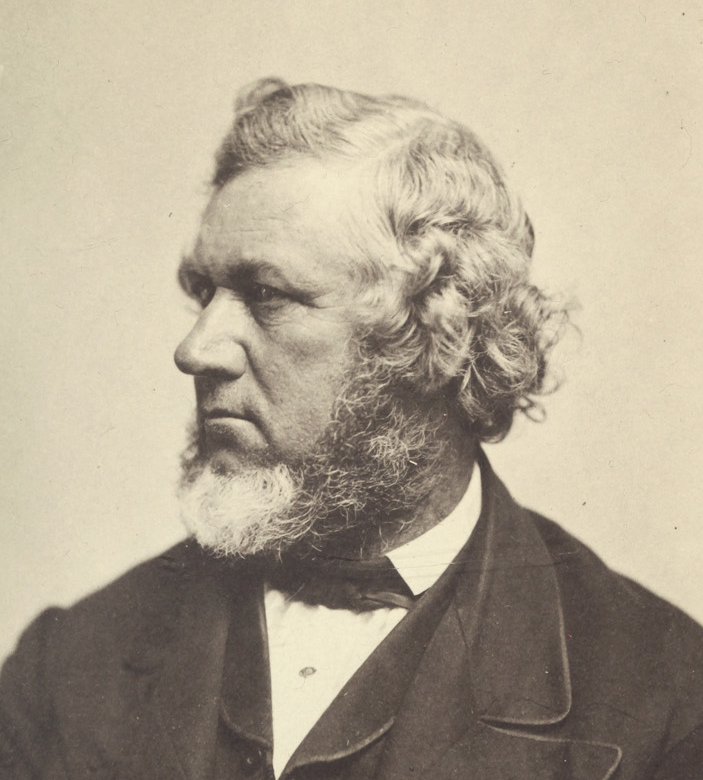

Collector of Customs the Newburyport District
- In office 1886–1890
- Preceded by: William H. Huse
- Succeeded by: Thomas C. Simpson

Mayor of Newburyport, Massachusetts
- In office 1877–1877
- Preceded by: Benjamin F. Atkinson
- Succeeded by: Jonathan Smith
- In office 1863–1863
- Preceded by: Issac H. Boardman
- Succeeded by: William Graves
- In office 1861–1862
- Preceded by: Moses Davenport
- Succeeded by: Issac H. Boardman

Postmaster of Newburyport
- In office 1858–1862
- Preceded by: John M. Cooper
- Succeeded by: Nathan A. Moulton

Personal details
- Born: January 22, 1814 New York, New York, U.S.
- Died: January 4, 1895 (aged 80) Newburyport, Massachusetts, U.S.
- Party: Democratic
- Occupation: Shipbuilder

George Washington Jackman Jr. (January 22, 1814 – January 4, 1895) was an American shipbuilder and politician from Newburyport, Massachusetts.

== Early life ==
Jackman's family had been involved in shipbuilding in Newburyport since 1790. In 1849, he purchased the shipyard of his deceased brother, Stephen. That same year he launched his first vessel, the Hollander, a 525-ton bark. In 1850, he constructed his first clipper ship, the 525-ton Arab.

Between 1850 and 1861, Jackman constructed nine clipper ships (Hussar, Whistler, Starr King, War Hawk, Charmer, Black Prince, Daring, Reynard, Fear Not), four barks (Annie Buckman, Falcon, Said Bin Sultan, and Nabob) and one schooner (Lydia). The War Hawk, was built for use in the Coolie trade. It was described by the Boston Daily Atlas as "unquestionable strong and beautiful... Her cabin accommodations, considering their space, could not have been designed better, or furnished with finer taste". The War Hawk was 193 feet long and had 23 feet depth of hold.

In 1861, Jackman secured a contract to build the USS Marblehead, a 529-ton gunboat, for the United States Navy. In 1863, Jackman completed the 1,040-ton USS Ascutney.

In 1863, Jackman constructed the A. N. Franklin (bark) and the Newbury (brig). The following year he built another clipper ship, the Nonantum.

In 1866, Jackman constructed two oak and hackmatack screw steamers, the Ontario and the Erie, for the American Steamship Company. The ships were 2,000 tons each, 325 feet long, and 29 feet deep.

In 1874, Jackman built the 1,350 ton Exporter and Reporter. The shipyard closed that December following the launch of his last ship, the 1,419-ton Landseer.

== Politics ==
=== City government ===
In 1854 and again from 1859 to 1861, Jackman represented Ward 6 on the Newburyport Board of Alderman. On February 27, 1861, Jackman was chosen to succeed the deceased Moses Davenport as Mayor. On April 19, 1861, Jackman and a committee of citizens arranged Newburyport's first citywide memorial service following the assassination of Abraham Lincoln. Jackman was elected to his own term in 1862 and served again from 1864 to 1865. From 1871 to 1872 he served another stint on the Board of Aldermen. In 1877, Jackman was elected to his fourth and final term as mayor.

=== Federal government ===
From 1858 to 1862, Jackman served as Newburyport's Postmaster. From 1886 to 1890, Jackman was the Collector of Customs for the Newburyport District.

=== State government ===
In 1868, Jackman represented the 1st Essex District in the Massachusetts House of Representatives.

== See also ==
- 1868 Massachusetts legislature
