= Thomas F. Cassidy =

American politician (1875–1941)

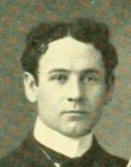

Member of the Massachusetts Senate for the Berkshire district
- In office 1906–1907
- Preceded by: William A. Burns
- Succeeded by: Clinton Q. Richmond

Personal details
- Born: June 1, 1875 Adams, Massachusetts, U.S.
- Died: September 2, 1941 (aged 66) Pittsfield, Massachusetts, U.S.
- Party: Democratic
- Education: Cornell Law School
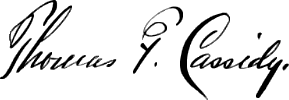
- Signature

Thomas Francis Cassidy (June 1, 1875 – September 2, 1941) was an American politician who was a member of the Massachusetts Senate from 1906 to 1907 and a member of the Massachusetts Racing Commission from 1935 to 1938. He was the Democratic Party's nominee for Lieutenant Governor of Massachusetts in 1910.

== Early life and legal career ==
Cassidy was born on June 1, 1875 in Adams, Massachusetts. He graduated from Cornell Law School in 1896 and was admitted to the bar that same year. By 1910, his practice had grown so much that he took on his brother, Francis W. Cassidy. The firm had offices in Adams, Cheshire, Massachusetts, and Pittsfield, Massachusetts.

== Politics ==
Cassidy represented the Berkshire district in the Massachusetts Senate in the 1906 and 1907 Massachusetts legislatures. He did not seek a third term.

Cassidy ran for Lieutenant Governor of Massachusetts and won the Democratic nomination after Thomas P. Riley dropped out to help end the deadlock over the party's nomination for Governor. He lost the general election to Republican Louis A. Frothingham 205,243 votes to 197,057.

Cassidy was the Democratic nominee in Massachusetts's 1st congressional district five times (1918, 1920, 1922, 1924, and 1932). He lost each election to Republican incumbent Allen T. Treadway. Their closest contest came in 1922, when Cassidy lost 51% to 49%.

In 1935, Governor James Michael Curley appointed Cassidy chairman Massachusetts Racing Commission following the resignation of Charles H. Cole. His appointment was held up by Massachusetts Governor's Council, but he was confirmed as a member of the commission after Curley agreed to give the chairmanship to an existing member, Charles F. Connors. Due to poor health, Cassidy was unable to perform nearly all of his duties as a commissioner. Despite this, he was reappointed by Curley's successor, Charles F. Hurley. In the 1938 Massachusetts gubernatorial election, Cassidy surprisingly endorsed Hurley over Curley for the Democratic nomination. Cassidy resigned from the commission on December 16, 1938.

== Personal life and death ==
Cassidy was married to Ada R. Lawrence and had two children. He was granted a divorce on July 17, 1913 on the grounds of desertion. His wife, who had moved to Ithaca, New York, was granted custody of the children, but Cassidy was allowed to visit them at any time.

Cassidy's home, known as "The Cedars", was located in Cheshire.

Cassidy died on September 2, 1941 at St. Luke's Hospital in Pittsfield, where he had been a patient for nearly six years.

Party political offices
Preceded by Eugene Foss	Democratic nominee for Lieutenant Governor of Massachusetts; 1910	Succeeded by David I. Walsh
