= United States Customs District of Newburyport =

The United States Customs District of Newburyport was an administrative area for the collection of import duties on foreign goods that entered the United States by ship at the port of Newburyport. It was established in 1789 and was abolished in 1910.

== History ==
The District of Newburyport was established in the fifth statute passed by the First Congress in 1789 (ch.5, 1 Stat. 30). This act provided for the collection of the duties that had been laid down in the Hamilton Tariff earlier that year. The town of Newburyport was designated as a port of entry for customs purposes. The towns of Amesbury, Salisbury and Haverhill were designated as ports of delivery only. The district extended to all the waters and shores from the State of New Hampshire, to the north line of Ipswich. A collector, naval officer and surveyor were appointed to the district to reside at Newburyport, which was the location of the Customs House for the district.

== Officers ==
The positions of collector, naval officer, and surveyor were appointed by the President, subject to confirmation by the Senate. From 1820 onwards, officers were limited to four-year commissions, at the end of which they needed to be reappointed by the President. They could be removed from office at the pleasure of the President.

=== Collector for the District (1789 - 1913) ===
Name	Entered office (Note: From 1820, collectors were appointed to four-year commission. The term of a collector may have expired for a short period before the new collector was confirmed, but the dates are shown as continuous.)	Left office	First Appointed By	Reason for Leaving Office
Stephen Cross	August 3, 1789	May 4, 1792	George Washington	???
Edward Wigglesworth	May 4, 1792	June 26, 1795	George Washington	???
Dudley Atkins Tyng	June 26, 1795	September 17, 1802	George Washington	???
Ralph Cross	September 17, 1802	1810	Thomas Jefferson	Died in Office
Joseph Marquand	1810	September 6, 1820	James Madison	Died in Office
None	September 6, 1820	November 29, 1820	Office Vacant	-
James Prince	November 29, 1820	January 10, 1829	James Monroe	Commission Expired
Solomon H. Currier	January 10, 1829	June 22, 1829	John Quincy Adams	Removed by Jackson
Samuel Phillips	June 22, 1829	July 10, 1841	Andrew Jackson	Removed by Tyler
Henry W. Kinsman	July 10, 1841	July 10, 1845	John Tyler	Commission Expired
William Nichols	July 10, 1845	July 10, 1849	James K. Polk	Commission Expired
Henry W. Kinsman	July 10, 1849	July 10, 1853	Zachary Taylor	Commission Expired
James Blood	July 10, 1853	April 10, 1861	Franklin Pierce	Removed by Lincoln
Enoch G. Currier	April 10, 1861	February 15, 1870	Abraham Lincoln	Commission Expired
William H. Huse	February 15, 1870	1886	Ulysses S. Grant	???
George W. Jackman Jr.	1886	June 20, 1890	Grover Cleveland	???
Thomas C. Simpson	June 20, 1890	April 25, 1892	Benjamin Harrison	Resigned
Hiram P. Mackintosh	April 25, 1892	1907	Benjamin Harrison	Died in office
Thomas Huse	1907	1910	Theodore Roosevelt	District eliminated
