= List of mayors of Newburyport, Massachusetts =

The mayor of Newburyport is the head of the municipal government in Newburyport, Massachusetts. There was no mayor of Newburyport until 1851, because up to that point Newburyport was still incorporated as a town.

== List of mayors ==
#	Mayor	Picture	Term	Party	Notes
1st	Caleb Cushing		June 24, 1851 – June 21, 1852	Democrat	Resigned June 21, 1852.
2nd	Henry Johnson		June 21, 1852 – 1853		Johnson was elected on June 21, 1852, to fill the position after Caleb Cushing resigned. Johnson was subsequently elected mayor in the annual city election of 1853.
3rd	Moses Davenport		1854-1855		
4th	William Cushing		1855–1858		
5th	Albert Currier		1859–1860		
6th	Moses Davenport		1861-February 18, 1861		Died on February 18, 1861.
7th	George W. Jackman Jr.		February 27, 1861 – 1862	Democrat	Elected on February 27, 1861, to replace Moses Davenport, who had died February 18, 1861. Jackman was subsequently elected mayor in the election of 1862.
8th	Issac H. Boardman		1863–1863		
9th	George W. Jackman Jr.		1864-1865	Democrat	
10th	William Graves		1866-1866		
11th	Eben Francis Stone		1867–1867	Republican	
12th	Nathaniel Pierce		1868-1869		
13th	Robert Couch		1870-1870		
14th	Elbridge G. Kelly		1871-1872		
15th	Warren Currier		1873-1874		
16th	Benjamin F. Atkinson		1875-1876		
17th	George W. Jackman, Jr.		1877-1877		Democrat
18th	Jonathan Smith		1878-1878		
19th	John J. Currier		1879-1880		
20th	Robert Couch		1881-1881		
21st	Benjamin Hale		1882-1882		
22nd	William A. Johnson		1883-1884		
23rd	Thomas C. Simpson		1885-1885	Republican	
24th	Charles C. Dame		1886-1886		
25th	J. Otis Winkley		1887-1887		
26th	William H. Huse		1888-March 28, 1888	Republican	Died March 28, 1888, replaced on April 2, 1888, by Albert C. Titcomb.
27th	Albert C. Titcomb		April 2, 1888 – 1889		Elected on April 2, 1888, to replace William H. Huse, who had died on March 28, 1888, Titcomb was elected to a full term in the annual city election of 1889.
28th	Elisha P. Dodge		1890-1891		
29th	Orin J. Gurney		1892-1895		
30th	Andrew R. Curtis		1896-1897		
31st	George H. Plummer		1898-1898		
32nd	Thomas Huse		1899-1900	Republican	
33rd	Moses Brown		1901-1902		
34th	James F. Carens		1903-1904		
35th	William F. Houston		1905-1906		
36th	Alfred F. Hunt		1907-1907		
37th	Irvin Besse		1908-1908		
38th	Alfred F. Hunt		1909-1909		
39th	Robert E. Burke		1910-1912		
40th	Hiram H. Landford		1913-1914		
41st	Clarence J. Fogg		1915-1916	Republican	
42nd	Walter B. Hopkinson		1917-1918	Republican	
43rd	David P. Page		1919-1920		
44th	Michael Cashman		1921-1925		
45th	Oscar H. Nelson		1926-1927		
46th	Andrew J. Gillis		1928-1931		
47th	Gayden Wells Morrill		1932-1935		
48th	Andrew J. Gillis		1936-1937		
49th	James F. Carens		1938-1941		
50th	John H. Kelleher		1942-1949		
51st	Andrew J. Gillis		1950-1953		
52nd	Henry Graf, Jr.		1954-1957		
53rd	Andrew J. Gillis		1958-1959		
54th	Albert H. Zabriskie		1960-1963		
55th	George H. Lawler, Jr.		1964-1967		
56th	Byron J. Matthews		1968-1978		
56th	Richard E. Sullivan		1978-1985		
57th	Peter J. Matthews		1985-1987		
58th	Edward G. Molin		1988-1989		
59th	Peter J. Matthews		1990-1993		
60th	Lisa L. Mead		1994-1997		Resigned to accept a position in Senator John Kerry's office.
Acting	Christopher R. Sullivan		1997		
61st	Mary M. Carrier		1998-1999		
62nd	Lisa L. Mead		2000-2001		
63rd	Al Lavender		2002-2003		
64th	Mary Anne Clancy		2004-2005		
65th	John F. Moak		2006-2009		
66th	Donna D. Holaday		2010–2022		
67th	Sean R. Reardon		2022–present		

== Notes ==
- Currier, John James: History of Newburyport, Mass: 1764-1905, Volume 2,

Newburyport (Mass.) 1909. Appendix XI. pages 602-612; Mayors and Members of the Board of Aldermen, 1851 to 1909.

- The Newburyport Mayor’s Office, mayors from 1950 to 2000.
