= William H. Huse =

American newspaper publisher and politician

Mayor of Newburyport, Massachusetts
- In office 1888–1888
- Preceded by: J. Otis Winkley
- Succeeded by: Albert C. Titcomb

Collector of Customs the Newburyport District
- In office 1870–1886
- Preceded by: Enoch G. Currier
- Succeeded by: George W. Jackman Jr.

Personal details
- Born: December 5, 1823 Newburyport, Massachusetts, U.S.
- Died: March 28, 1888 (aged 64) Newburyport, Massachusetts, U.S.
- Party: Republican
- Occupation: Newspaper publisher

William H. Huse (December 5, 1823 – March 28, 1888) was an American newspaper publisher and politician from Newburyport, Massachusetts.

== Publishing ==
On October 7, 1845, Huse, Joseph Bragdon, and Alfred M. Berry began publishing the Newburyport Advertiser, a semi-weekly newspaper. Berry left the paper on January 1, 1847 and Hues and Bragdon continued to publish it until July 10, 1849 when they discontinued the paper in favor of the Daily Evening Union, a daily evening journal published by Huse, Bragdon, Charles Nason, and James C. Peabody. By June 1, 1852, Huse was the sole publisher of the paper. In January 1854, Huse joined the firm of Morss and Brewster, which published the Daily Herald of Newburyport. The firm changed its name to Morss, Brewster & Huse upon the addition of Huse and Huse's paper, the Daily Evening Union, was discontinued. Two years later Joseph B. Morss and William H. Brewster sold the business to Huse, who added new associates and changed the firm's name to William H. Huse & Co. In 1899, the paper was sold to the Newburyport Herald Company.

From 1854 to 1856, Huse also published the Saturday Evening Union and Weekly Family Visitor (renamed the Saturday Evening Union and Essex North Record in February 1855).

== Political career ==
From 1855 to 1856, Huse represented Newburyport in the Massachusetts House of Representatives.

In 1857, Huse and others incorporated the Mechanics Library Association for the purpose of promoting "the instruction and improvement of young men engaged in mechanical pursuits".

From 1861 to 1863, and again in 1866 Huse represented Ward Five on the Newburyport board of aldermen.

From 1870 to 1886, Huse was the Collector of Customs the Newburyport District.

In 1888, Huse was elected Mayor of Newburyport. He died in office on March 28, 1888.
