= William F. Garcelon =

American politician, lawyer, sportsman, and coach (1868–1949)

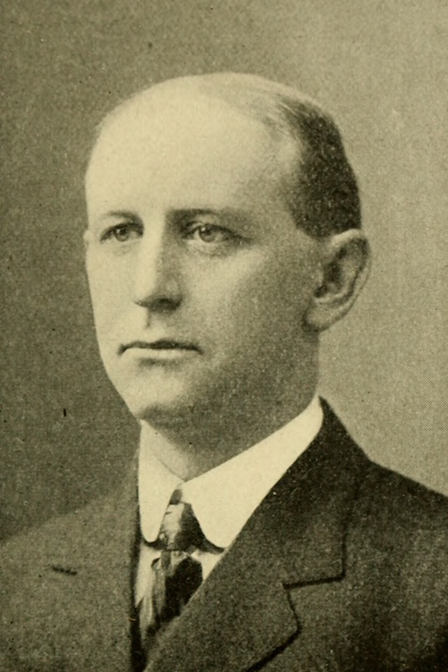

Biographical details
- Born: October 24, 1868; Lewiston, Maine, U.S.
- Died: July 4, 1949 (aged 80); Beverly, Massachusetts, U.S.

Playing career

Football
- 1889: Bates
- 1893–1894: Boston Athletic Association

Track and field
- 1893–1894: Harvard
- Position: Halfback (football)

Coaching career (HC unless noted)

Football
- 1894: Bates

Track
- 1898–1902: Bowdoin
- 1904: Harvard

William Frye Garcelon Jr. (October 24, 1868 – July 4, 1949) was an American politician, lawyer, college football player, track and field athlete, and coach. He served as the head football coach at Bates College in 1894. Garcelon was a member of the Massachusetts House of Representatives in 1907 and 1908.

Garcelon was born October 24, 1868, in Lewiston, Maine. He attended Bates College, where he played football and baseball and was a member of the track team. In 1893 and 1894, he played football at left halfback for the Boston Athletic Association (BAA). He graduated from Harvard Law School in 1895. Garcelon coached track at Harvard in 1904 was the graduate manager of the Harvard Athletic Association from 1908 to 1913. Around the same time, he was an athletics instructor at Roxbury Latin School in Boston and coached the track team at Portland High School in Portland, Maine. In 1933, Garcelon was elected president of the Boston Garden and became the head of the BAA in 1934. He died on July 4, 1949, at his home in Beverly, Massachusetts.
