= Thomas C. Simpson =

American politician

Collector of Customs the Newburyport District
- In office 1890–1892
- Preceded by: George W. Jackman Jr.
- Succeeded by: Hiram P. Mackintosh

Mayor of Newburyport, Massachusetts
- In office 1885–1885
- Preceded by: William A. Johnson
- Succeeded by: Charles C. Dame

Personal details
- Born: March 21, 1853 Newburyport, Massachusetts, U.S.
- Died: November 27, 1922 (aged 69) Boston, Massachusetts, U.S.
- Party: Republican
- Education: Bowdoin College
- Occupation: Judge; Attorney; Businessman; Politician

Thomas Charles Simpson (March 21, 1853 – November 27, 1922) was an American businessman, jurist, and politician from Newburyport, Massachusetts.

== Legal career ==
Simpson earned an undergraduate degree from Bowdoin College and a Bachelor of Laws degree from the Boston University School of Law. He was admitted to the bar in 1877. He was appointed a special justice of the Newburyport Police Court in 1881 and justice of the court in 1900.

== Political career ==
From 1879 to 1881, Simpson was a member of the Newburyport school committee. He then served on the city's board of aldermen. In 1883, he represented the 16th Essex District in the Massachusetts House of Representatives. In 1885 he served as the mayor of Newburyport.

On June 28, 1890, President Benjamin Harrison nominated Simpson for the position of Collector of Customs the Newburyport District. He held this position until 1892.

== Business career ==
In 1882, Simpson and a group of Massachusetts businessmen formed the Altamonte Land, Hotel and Navigation Company. The company began purchasing land in the area of Lakes Orienta, Adelaide, and Florida and in 1883 opened the Altamonte Hotel. The area became known as Altamonte Springs, Florida. One of the streets in the new community was named Newburyport Street after the hometown of Simpson and many other of the company's investors.

In 1884, Simpson and David L. Withington purchased the Plumb Island Bridge and a small hotel on the island. They sold the property three years later.

In 1886, Simpson and seven others founded the Newburyport Street Sprinkling Association, which watered properties on a few streets in the city. The association was dissolved the following year after the city of Newburyport took over responsibility for watering the streets.
