= Benjamin A. Cook =

American politician (1867–1938)

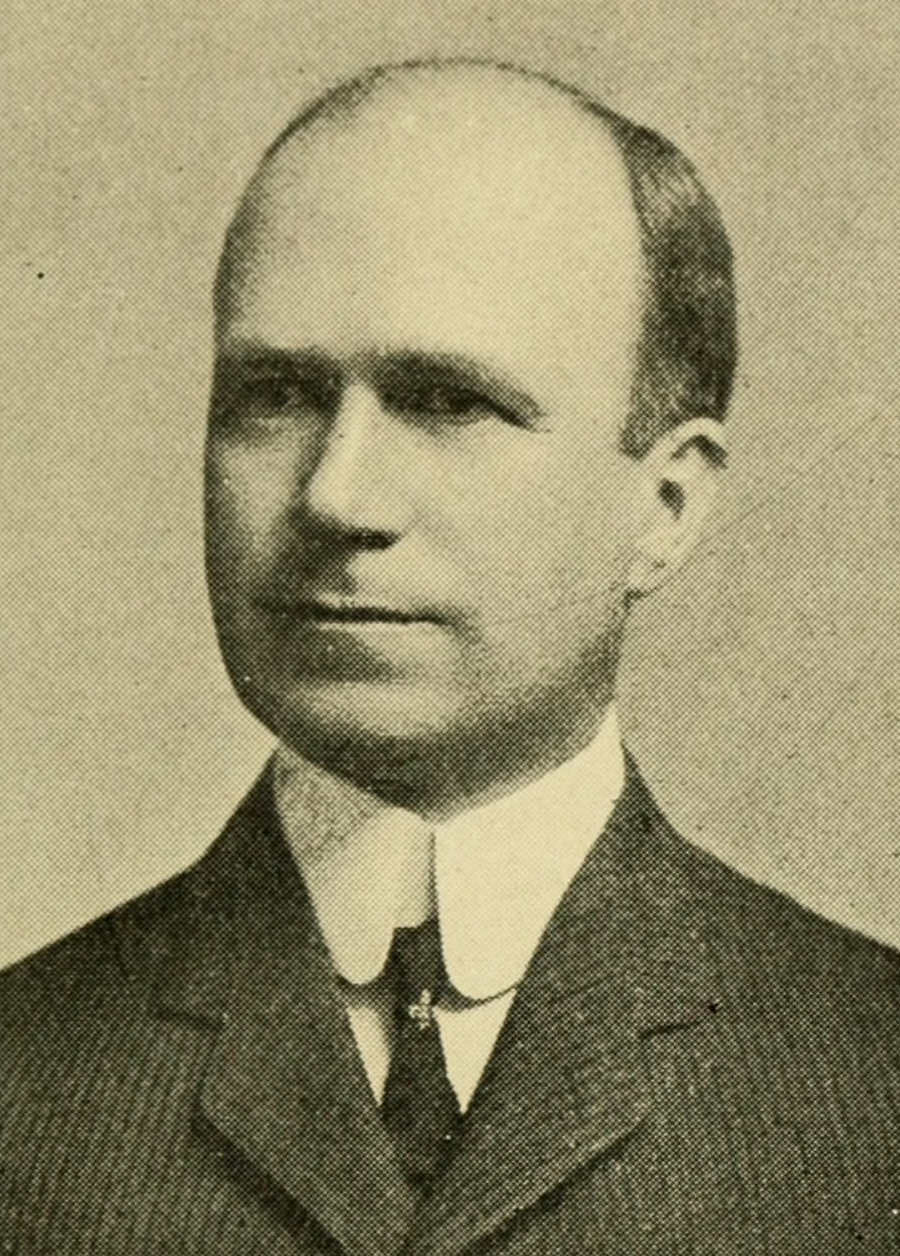
- Cook as a member of the Massachusetts House of Representatives

Mayor of Fitchburg, Massachusetts
- In office 1914–1916
- Preceded by: Frank O. Hardy
- Succeeded by: Marcus Coolidge

Member of the Massachusetts House of Representatives from the 12th Worcester District
- In office 1908–1909

Personal details
- Born: June 30, 1867 Guilford, Vermont, U.S.
- Died: August 29, 1938 (aged 71) Fitchburg, Massachusetts, U.S.
- Party: Republican

Benjamin Albert Cook (June 30, 1867 – August 29, 1938) was an American politician who was a member of the Massachusetts House of Representatives from 1908 to 1909 and mayor of Fitchburg, Massachusetts from 1914 to 1916.

== Early life ==
Cook was born in Guilford, Vermont on June 30, 1867. He graduated from Brattleboro High School in Brattleboro, Vermont. In 1894, he founded B. A. Cook & Company, a retailer of hardware, paint, and wallpaper, in Fitchburg.

== Politics ==
Cook represented the 12th Worcester district in the Massachusetts House of Representatives in the 1908 and 1909 Massachusetts legislatures. In 1913, Cook was elected mayor of Fitchburg as the nominee of the citizen's party. He defeated independent-citizens' candidate John Moran 2859 votes to 2341. He was reelected in 1914. During World War I, cook was chairman of the Liberty Loan Committee in northern Worcester County. He was the 12th Worcester district's delegate to the Massachusetts Constitutional Convention of 1917–1918.

== Death ==
Cook died on August 29, 1938, at his home in Fitchburg, after a long illness. He was survived by his wife and a son.
