= William Hoag =

American politician and football coach (1870–1953)

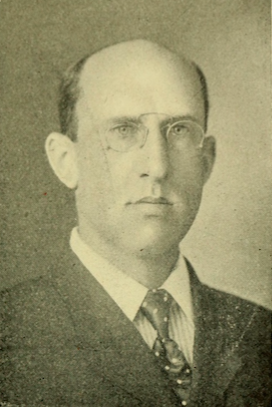

Biographical details
- Born: November 18, 1870; Lynn, Massachusetts, U.S.
- Died: August 19, 1953 (aged 82); Reading, Massachusetts, U.S.
- Education: Harvard (1894 AB); Boston U. (1896 LLB)

Playing career
- 1892: Harvard

Coaching career (HC unless noted)
- 1896: Bowdoin
- 1897–1901: Bates

Head coaching record
- Overall: 8–6–2

William Hoag (November 18, 1870 – August 19, 1953) was an American lawyer, state legislator, and college football player and coach. A Republican, he was a member of the Massachusetts House of Representatives in 1907 and 1908.

Hoag played college football at Harvard University during the 1892 season. He graduated from Harvard in 1894. Hoag served as the head football coach at Bowdoin College in 1896 and at Bates College from 1897 to 1901.

Hoag died on August 19, 1953, as his home in Reading, Massachusetts.
