= Paul Reardon =

American judge (1909–1988)

Paul Cashman Reardon (December 23, 1909 – July 29, 1988) was an American justice of the Massachusetts Supreme Judicial Court from 1962 to 1972. He was appointed by Governor John Volpe.

== Early life, education, career, and military service ==
Born in Quincy, Massachusetts to Dr. Daniel B. Reardon and Mary Cashman Reardon, Reardon attended Quincy High School where he was "the premier debater on the Quincy team". Reardon spent a year at Phillips Academy in Andover, Massachusetts, before entering Harvard College, from which he received a B.A., cum laude, in 1932. He received his J.D. from Harvard Law School in 1935, and entered the practice of law with a Massachusetts firm that year.

In 1939, Reardon started his own practice and married Ann Leich. Reardon joined the United States Navy during World War II, achieving the rank of Lieutenant. Following the war he again practiced with a firm until 1953, when he was appointed as Counsel to Governor Christian Herter.

== Judicial service ==
In 1955, Herter appointed Reardon Chief Justice of the Massachusetts Superior Court, and in 1957 Reardon was instrumental in establishing the National Conference of State Trial Judges, which facilitated communication between judges of different states on strategies for handling the common problem of congested dockets and backlogged cases. During this time, Reardon was elected to serve as President of the Harvard Alumni Association for the 1959-1960 term.

In 1962, Governor John A. Volpe appointed Reardon to the Massachusetts Supreme Judicial Court, where Reardon sat for 15 years until his retirement in 1976. In 1964, at the invitation of American Bar Association President Lewis Powell, Reardon chaired a ten-member national committee to examine the relationship between the free press and fair trials and establish "guidelines for regulating news coverage of criminal trials". In 1966, the committee issued a lengthy report finding many issues arising from the conduct of law enforcement officers and attorneys, and recommending "rules for lawyers, courts and law enforcement officials to follow in preventing news stories from prejudicing juries in criminal cases". The report was condemned by news organizations, but endorsed by the American Bar Association and enacted to some degree into the legal codes of ethics of all fifty states. During his time on the court, Reardon he wrote over 600 opinions, including a 1969 opinion postponing an inquest into the death of Mary Jo Kopechne, and a 1973 opinion in the case of School Committee of Boston v. Board of Education, holding that despite imperfections in a plan to achieve racial desegregation of Boston's schools, the board carrying out this effort had acted within its authority to impose various rules towards this effort.

== Personal life and death ==
Reardon and his wife, Ann, were married for 49 years, until his death. They had two sons and two daughters.

Reardon died of heart failure at Massachusetts General Hospital at the age of 78, and was interred at Mount Wollaston Cemetery in Quincy.

Political offices
Preceded by Harold P. Williams	Justice of the Massachusetts Supreme Judicial Court; 1962–1972	Succeeded by Ruth Abrams
