= William D. Chapple =

American politician

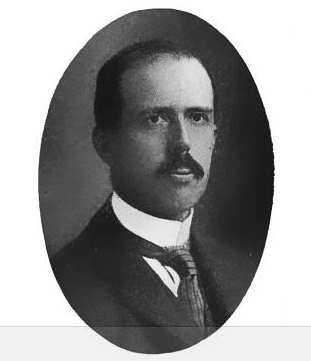

President of the Massachusetts Senate
- In office 1907–1908
- Preceded by: William F. Dana
- Succeeded by: Allen T. Treadway
- Majority: 3,734 (1908)

Member of the Massachusetts Senate 2nd Essex District
- In office 1905–1908
- Preceded by: Samuel Cole
- Succeeded by: Clifford B. Bray

Personal details
- Born: August 6, 1868 Salem, Massachusetts
- Died: May 3, 1956 (aged 87) Salem, Massachusetts
- Party: Republican
- Education: Boston University School of Law, 1890

William D. Chapple (August 6, 1868 – May 3, 1956) was a Massachusetts lawyer and politician who served as President of the Massachusetts Senate.

== Early life and education ==
Chapple was born on August 6, 1868, in Salem. He graduated from Salem High School in 1887 and Boston University School of Law in 1890. He was admitted to the Essex County bar in 1890.

== Political career ==
From 1894 to 1896, Chapple was a member of the Salem, Massachusetts Common Council. He served as council president in 1896. From 1897 to 1900 he was a member of the Massachusetts House of Representatives. From 1905 to 1908, Chapple represented the Second Essex district in the Massachusetts Senate. From 1907 to 1908 he served as Senate President. From 1915 to 1917, Chapple was Salem's city solicitor.

== Death ==
Chapple died on May 3, 1956, at his home in Salem.

== See also ==
- 126th Massachusetts General Court (1905)
- 128th Massachusetts General Court (1907)
- 129th Massachusetts General Court
