= Stanley Elroy Qua =

American judge (1880–1965)

Justice of the Massachusetts Supreme Judicial Court
- In office 1934–1956

Stanley Elroy Qua (August 26, 1880 – November 8, 1965) was a justice of the Massachusetts Supreme Judicial Court from 1934 to 1956, serving as chief justice from 1947 to 1956 He was appointed by Governor Joseph B. Ely, and elevated to Chief Justice by Governor Robert F. Bradford.

Born in Lowell, Massachusetts, Qua was the son of Francis W. Qua, a local lawyer who practiced in Lowell and served his community as City Solicitor for many years, and Alice Lelia Harder. Qua attended Lowell Public Schools, then graduated with honors from Dartmouth College in 1901, where he was accepted in Phi Beta Kappa society, and received a Bachelor of Laws from Harvard Law School in 1904. He began his legal career with his father's law firm, which is still in existence today as Qua, Hall, Harvey & Walsh in Chelmsford, MA, where he practiced for 17 years with his father and brother, and upon his death bequeathed his personal law library back to the firm. Qua served as an Alderman and a City Councillor in Lowell before eventually being selected for the Superior Court in 1921 and later elevated to the Supreme Court.
