= George H. Battis =

American politician

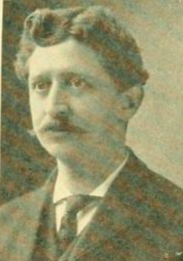

Member of the Massachusetts House of Representatives from the 1st Suffolk district
- In office 1903–1905
- Preceded by: Charles I. Albee
- Succeeded by: Robert J. Gove

Personal details
- Born: January 19, 1863 East Boston, Massachusetts
- Died: September 1937 (aged 74) East Boston, Massachusetts
- Party: Republican

George H. Battis (1863 – 1937) was an American politician who served on the Boston Common Council, Boston Board of Aldermen, and the Massachusetts House of Representatives.

== Early life ==
Battis was born on January 19, 1863, in East Boston. He attended Boston public schools. Outside of politics, Battis worked as a wholesale shoe salesman. At one time he served a president of Winch Brothers.

== Political career ==
In 1892, Battis was elected chairman of the Ward 1 Republican committee. From 1899 to 1901, Battis was a member of the Boston Common Council. From 1902 to 1904 he represented the 1st Suffolk District (consisting of Ward 1) in the Massachusetts House of Representatives. In 1904 he served as chairman of the House Committee on Printing. From 1906 to 1907 he was a member of the Boston Board of Alderman.

== Larceny conviction ==
In 1909, Battis was indicted for larceny. He was alleged to have charged the city of Boston $334.25 more than he actually paid for trophies he purchased for the East Boston Fourth of July celebrations in 1906 and 1907. His first trial ended on March 23, 1909. After nine and a half hours of deliberation, the jury was unable to reach a decision. His second trial began on May 25, 1909. On May 28, the jury returned a guilty verdict. He received a three-year sentence and was sent to Deer Island Prison. On December 22, 1910, Battis received a pardon from Governor Eben Sumner Draper and the Massachusetts Governor's Council. Battis' poor health, his good behavior in prison, and the fact that others who had been implicated in similar cases had received lighter sentences, were reported to be factors in the decision to pardon him.

== Death ==
Upon his release from prison, Battis returned to East Boston. He died in September 1937.
