= Thomas Huse =

American politician

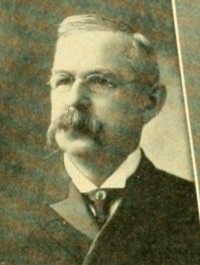

Collector of Customs the Newburyport District
- In office 1907–1910
- Preceded by: Hiram P. Mackintosh
- Succeeded by: District eliminated

Mayor of Newburyport, Massachusetts
- In office 1899–1900
- Preceded by: George H. Plummer
- Succeeded by: Moses Brown

Personal details
- Born: June 28, 1851 Newburyport, Massachusetts
- Died: December 22, 1931 (aged 80) Newburyport, Massachusetts
- Party: Republican
- Education: Dummer Academy
- Occupation: Attorney; Politician

Thomas Huse (June 28, 1851 – December 22, 1931) was an American attorney and politician from Newburyport, Massachusetts.

== Early life ==
Huse was born in Newburyport on June 28, 1851. He attended Newburyport public schools and the Dummer Academy. After school he became an attorney at law.

== Political career ==
From 1877 to 1879, Huse was a member of the Newburyport Common Council. In 1897 he was a member of the Board of Aldermen. He served as Mayor from 1899 to 1900. From 1904 to 1905, Huse represented the 22nd Essex district in the Massachusetts House of Representatives.

On December 4, 1907, Huse was nominated to be the Collector of Customs for the Newburyport District. He was confirmed by the United States Senate on December 10, 1907. Huse initially declined the position, but changed his mind and accepted on December 31. In 1909, Huse received only $6.70 in compensation due to the lack of collections made in the port. He tendered his resignation, however no desirable person was willing to accept the position. On August 5, 1910, the United States Treasury Department eliminated the district. Huse was appointed a deputy collector at an annual salary of $300 and ordered to report to the Boston Collector.

From 1910 to 1913, Huse served as Newburyport's Fire Chief. He died on December 22, 1931.
