= Frederick G. Katzmann =

American lawyer and politician (1875–1953)

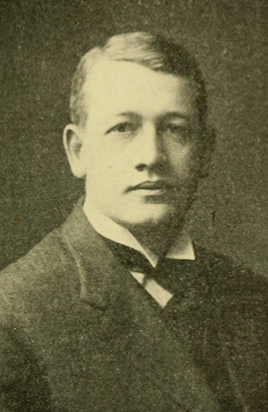

District Attorney for the Southeastern District
- In office 1917–1923
- Preceded by: Albert F. Barker
- Succeeded by: Harold P. Williams

Member of the Massachusetts House of Representatives from the 3rd Norfolk District
- In office 1907–1908

Personal details
- Born: September 12, 1875 Roxbury
- Died: October 15, 1953 (aged 78) Roslindale
- Party: Republican
- Spouse: Grace L. Brown (1904–1924; her death)
- Education: Harvard College; Boston University Law School
- Occupation: Attorney

Frederick G. Katzmann (September 12, 1875 – October 15, 1953) was an American attorney and politician from Massachusetts who served as district attorney for Norfolk and Plymouth counties. He prosecuted Nicola Sacco and Bartolomeo Vanzetti for armed robbery and murder in a case that drew worldwide attention.

== Early life ==
Katzmann was born on September 12, 1875, in Roxbury. He graduated from Boston Latin School in 1892 and Harvard College in 1896. From 1896 to 1902 he worked as an assistant superintendent of the Hyde Park, Denham and Milton Light and Power Company. In 1902 he graduated from the Boston University School of Law.

== Political career ==
From 1907 to 1908, Katzmann represented the 3rd Norfolk District in the Massachusetts House of Representatives. He also served as chairman of the Hyde Park Republican committee.

== Legal career ==
Katzmann began his legal career in the office of Richard S. Dow. He later opened his office with his brother Percy A. Katzmann in Hyde Park. The two opened a second office in Boston and in 1905 former district attorney Thomas E. Grover joined the firm. On December 20, 1909, he was appointed as an assistant district attorney for the southeastern district (Norfolk and Plymouth counties).

On January 3, 1917, Katzmann was sworn in as district attorney. In 1921 he prosecuted Nicola Sacco and Bartolomeo Vanzetti for armed robbery and the murder of a security guard and paymaster during an armed robbery. Sacco and Vanzetti were found guilty and executed. Katzmann left office in 1923 and returned to private practice. However, he remained involved in later phases the Sacco and Vanzetti case by representing the government as a special assistant to the district attorney.

== Banking ==
In addition to his work as an attorney, Katzmann was also the longtime president of the Hyde Park Savings Bank as well as a trustee of the International Trust Company.

== Death ==
On October 15, 1953, Katzmann collapsed during a civil trial in Norfolk Superior Court. He died that night in Roslindale General Hospital.
