= Frederick H. Tarr =

American politician

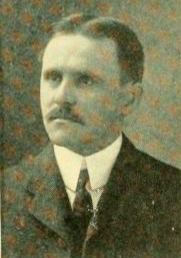

United States Attorney for the District of Massachusetts
- In office 1926–1933
- Preceded by: Harold P. Williams
- Succeeded by: Francis Ford

Member of the Massachusetts Governor's Council from the Fifth District
- In office 1916–1918
- Preceded by: Edward G. Frothingham
- Succeeded by: James Ingraham

Personal details
- Born: October 8, 1868 Rockport, Massachusetts
- Died: May 13, 1944 (aged 75) Rockport, Massachusetts
- Resting place: Beach Grove Cemetery, Rockport, MA
- Party: Republican
- Spouse: Angie Parker
- Education: Amherst College; Harvard Law School
- Occupation: Attorney

Frederick Hamilton Tarr (October 8, 1868 – May 13, 1944) was an American attorney and politician who was a member of the Massachusetts House of Representatives from 1904 to 1905, a member of the Massachusetts Governor's Council from 1916 to 1918, and the United States Attorney for the District of Massachusetts from 1926 to 1933.

His son, Frederick H. Tarr, Jr. was a Massachusetts state representative.
