= Eugene Hultman =

American politician (1875-1945)

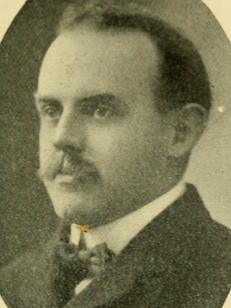
- Hultman circa 1908

Commissioner of the Boston Police Department
- In office 1930–1934
- Preceded by: Herbert A. Wilson
- Succeeded by: Joseph J. Leonard

Commissioner of the Boston Fire Department
- In office 1926–1930
- Preceded by: Theodore A. Glynn
- Succeeded by: Edward F. McLaughlin

Personal details
- Born: July 13, 1875 Boston
- Died: April 22, 1945 (aged 69) Duxbury, Massachusetts
- Party: Republican
- Education: Massachusetts Institute of Technology

Eugene C. Hultman (July 13, 1875 – April 22, 1945) was an American political figure who held numerous positions in state and local government in Massachusetts, including Chairman of the Metropolitan District Commission, Commissioner of the Boston Police, Fire, and Building Departments, and member of the Massachusetts General Court.

== Early life ==
Hultman was born on July 13, 1875, in Boston. His father was a sea captain from Sweden. Hultman attended public schools in Boston and Quincy, Massachusetts, and graduated from the Massachusetts Institute of Technology in 1896. He worked as a consulting engineer and auditor.

== Political career ==
Hultman was elected to the Quincy city council in 1899. From 1906 to 1908 he represented the 5th Norfolk district in the Massachusetts House of Representatives. In 1909 he represented the First Norfolk District in the Massachusetts Senate. In 1920 he was appointed state Fuel Administrator and chairman of the Commission on the Necessaries of Life by Governor Calvin Coolidge. In 1926 he was appointed Fire Commissioner of Boston by Mayor Malcolm E. Nichols. In January 1930, Nichols' successor James Michael Curley moved Hultman to the position of Building Commissioner. Four months later, Hultman was appointed commissioner of the Boston Police Department by Governor Frank G. Allen. During his tenure as police commissioner, Hultman fought against the city's racketeers and gangsters and opposed civil service examinations for captains, desiring to appoint them himself. He resigned on December 28, 1934, to accept the appointment of chairman of the Metropolitan District Commission. He was reappointed by Governor Leverett Saltonstall in 1940. In February 1945, Saltonstall's successor, Maurice J. Tobin, attempted to replace Hultman with William Arthur Reilly, however the Massachusetts Governor's Council blocked Reilly's appointment. Hultman died of a heart attack on April 22, 1945, at his summer home in Duxbury, Massachusetts.
