= John N. Cole =

American politician (1863–1922)

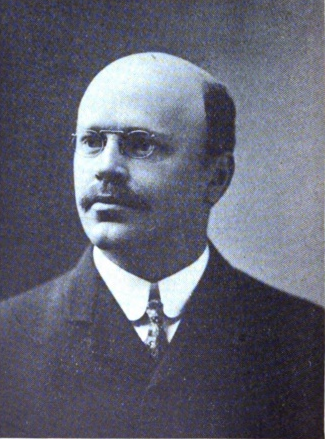

Speaker of the Massachusetts House of Representatives
- In office 1906–1908
- Preceded by: Louis A. Frothingham
- Succeeded by: Joseph H. Walker

Massachusetts Commissioner of Public Works
- In office 1919–1922
- Preceded by: Position created
- Succeeded by: William F. Williams

Personal details
- Born: November 4, 1863 Andover, Massachusetts
- Died: October 18, 1922 (aged 58) Boston, Massachusetts
- Resting place: Spring Grove Cemetery, Andover, Massachusetts
- Party: Republican
- Spouse: Minnie White Poor

John Nelson Cole (November 4, 1863 – October 18, 1922) was an American politician who served as the Speaker of the Massachusetts House of Representatives from 1906 to 1908.

== Early life ==
Cole was born in Andover, Massachusetts on November 4, 1863. He attended public school for a short time, but left at an early age to work at the Marland Woolen Mill. Cole worked at the mill for five years. By the time he left he had been promoted to the position of paymaster.

Cole married Minnie White Poor of Newburyport, Massachusetts. They had three daughters and one son.

== Journalism ==
In 1887, Cole became editor of the Andover Townsman. In 1896 he became the publisher of the Lawrence Telegram. He was also the manager and treasurer of the Andover Press. As a newspaperman, Cole gained a reputation as an aggressive political fighter who was not afraid to oppose his own party's machine.

== Political career ==
In 1895, Cole was elected to the Andover School Committee. He also served on the town's Finance Committee and Park Commission.

In 1902, Cole was elected to the Massachusetts House of Representatives. During his tenure in the House, Cole served as Chairman of the Committee on Rules and the Committee on Public Lighting. He also served on the Committee on the Relations between Employer and Employee, which issued a favorable report upon the Workman's Compensation Act, which was passed by the Legislature in 1908.

Cole was a candidate for Speaker of the House for the 1906 legislative session. His opponents were Joseph H. Walker and Robert Luce. Luce withdrew from the race on November 14, 1905 and gave his support to Walker. Cole and Walker held a conference at the State House on November 28, during which pledged voters were canvassed. As Cole had the majority needed to become Speaker, Walker withdrew from the race.

On February 4, 1908, Cole, who had solicited reduced railroad rates for school children, was indicted by a grand jury on 123 separate counts of violating a law which prohibited Government officers from asking for railroad passes or tickets at reduced rates for themselves or others. On February 11, the indictment was quashed by the Chief Justice of the Essex Superior Court. Later that day Cole was given a round of applause when he appeared in the House Chamber and received three cheers when he arrived at the Speaker's desk.

In 1908, Cole ran unsuccessfully for the Republican nomination for Lieutenant Governor of Massachusetts as an anti-machine candidate. In 1911, he lost the Republican nomination for Governor to Louis A. Frothingham. In 1915 he was nominated for the position of Medford city solicitor, but he was not confirmed by the city council.

In 1913, Cole was appointed Chairman of the Commission of Efficiency and Economy by Governor Eugene Foss. From 1914 until his death, Cole was Chairman of the Boston Industrial Development Board. In 1916, Governor Samuel W. McCall appointed Cole to the Massachusetts Waterways and Public Lands Commission. In 1919, Cole was appointed Commissioner of Public Works by Governor Calvin Coolidge, a new position created by merger of the Waterways and Public Lands Commission with the Highway Commission.

== Death ==
On October 18, 1922, Cole died at Massachusetts General Hospital in Boston. He had been ill for several weeks and died following an operation. After his death, Governor Channing Cox ordered that flags be lowered to half-staff until after Cole's funeral. Cole's funeral was held on October 20 in Andover. Business was suspended and town offices were closed during the funeral. His funeral was attended by a number of prominent officials, including Cox, Lieutenant Governor Alvan T. Fuller, Congressman John Jacob Rogers, Assistant District Attorney Jay R. Benton, Everett Chamberlin Benton, and former Mayor of Boston Malcolm Nichols. Cole was buried in Spring Grove Cemetery.

== See also ==
- 128th Massachusetts General Court (1907)
- 129th Massachusetts General Court

Massachusetts House of Representatives
| Preceded by Louis A. Frothingham | Speaker of the Massachusetts House of Representatives; 1906 — 1908 | Succeeded by Joseph H. Walker |
