= Clarence J. Fogg =

American politician

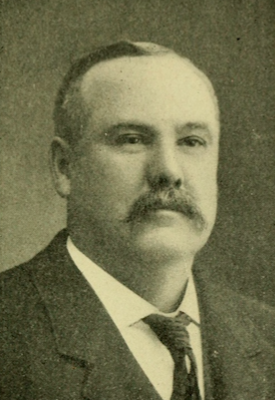
- 1908 Clarence Fogg Massachusetts House of Representatives

41st Mayor of Newburyport, Massachusetts
- In office 1915–1916
- Preceded by: Walter B. Hopkinson
- Succeeded by: Hiram H. Landford

Member of the Massachusetts House of Representatives Twenty Fifth Essex District

Member of the Newburyport, Massachusetts Board of Aldermen Ward 2
- In office 1901–1902

Member of the Newburyport, Massachusetts Common Council
- In office 1900–1900

Personal details
- Born: July 10, 1853 Newburyport, Massachusetts
- Died: 1936 (aged 82–83)
- Party: Republican
- Occupation: Sailor, Shoe cutter

Clarence J. Fogg (1853-1936) was an American sailor and politician who served as a member of the Massachusetts House of Representatives and as the forty first mayor of Newburyport, Massachusetts.

== Early life ==
Fogg was born in Newburyport, Massachusetts on July 10, 1853.

== Business career ==
Fogg spent twenty years at sea, after which he became a shoe cutter.

== Political career ==
Fogg was a Member of the Newbury Common Council in 1900, and from 1901 to 1902 a member of the Board of Aldermen from Ward 2

== Notes ==
Political offices
Preceded by Hiram H. Landford	41st Mayor of Newburyport, Massachusetts; 1915-1916	Succeeded by Walter B. Hopkinson
