= Joseph Soliday =

American teacher, attorney, banker, and legislator

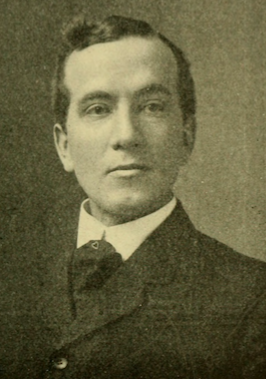
Portrait of Joseph H. Soliday

Joseph H. Soliday (circa 1869–1947) was a teacher, attorney, banker, and legislator from Dedham, Massachusetts. Soliday was graduated from the Geneva Normal School and taught school for several years before becoming an attorney. He served in the Massachusetts House of Representatives from 1905 to 1908. He was then treasurer of Dedham Savings from 1910 to 1920 and later was the president of the Franklin Savings Bank.

From 1926 to 1931 he was a member of the Metropolitan Water Supply Commission and in 1924 he served on the Commission on Bank Taxation. With his wife, Hattie, he had a daughter.
