= M. Fred O'Connell =

American jurist and politician (1870–1957)

M. Fred OConnell
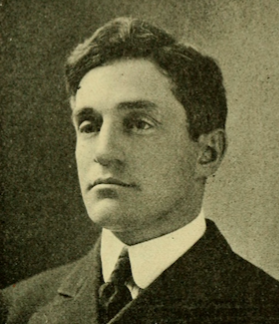
- O'Connell as a member of the Massachusetts House of Representatives

Mayor of Fitchburg, Massachusetts
- In office 1909–1912
- Preceded by: James H. McMahon
- Succeeded by: Frank O. Hardy

Member of the Massachusetts House of Representatives from the 12th Worcester District
- In office 1905–1908

Personal details
- Born: June 4, 1870 Hopedale, Massachusetts, U.S.
- Died: April 21, 1957 (aged 86) Boston, Massachusetts, U.S.
- Party: Democratic Party
- Education: Bryant & Stratton College; Boston University School of Law

Michael Frederick O'Connell (June 4, 1870 – April 21, 1957) was an American jurist and politician who was a member of the Massachusetts House of Representatives (1905–1908), mayor of Fitchburg, Massachusetts (1909–1912), and an associate justice of the Fitchburg District Court (1932–1953).

== Early life ==
O'Connell was born in Hopedale, Massachusetts on June 4, 1870. He attended Bryant & Stratton College. He worked as a journalist and was a correspondent for The Boston Globe for fifteen years.

== Politics ==
From 1904 to 1905, O'Connell was chairman of the Fitchburg Democratic city committee. From 1905 to 1908, he represented the 12th Worcester district in the Massachusetts House of Representatives. In 1908, he was elected mayor of Fitchburg by a plurality of 126 votes. He was reelected in 1909 and 1910, but was defeated in 1911 by Frank O. Hardy.

In the 1912 United States House of Representatives elections, O'Connell was the Democratic nominee in Massachusetts's 3rd congressional district. He lost to Republican incumbent William Wilder 45% to 34%. He sought the seat again in 1922, but was defeated by Calvin Paige. He ran a third time in 1932 and was again beaten, this time by Frank H. Foss.

== Legal career ==
O'Connell graduated from the Boston University School of Law in 1898 and was admitted to the bar that same year. In 1932, he was appointed an associate justice of the Fitchburg District Court by Governor Joseph B. Ely. He retired from the bench in 1953 after a state law was passed prohibiting district court judges from appearing as attorneys in district courts. He then started a firm with Francis Barnes. He died on April 21, 1957 at St. Elizabeths Hospital in Boston.
