= William Otis Faxon =

American politician (1853–1942)

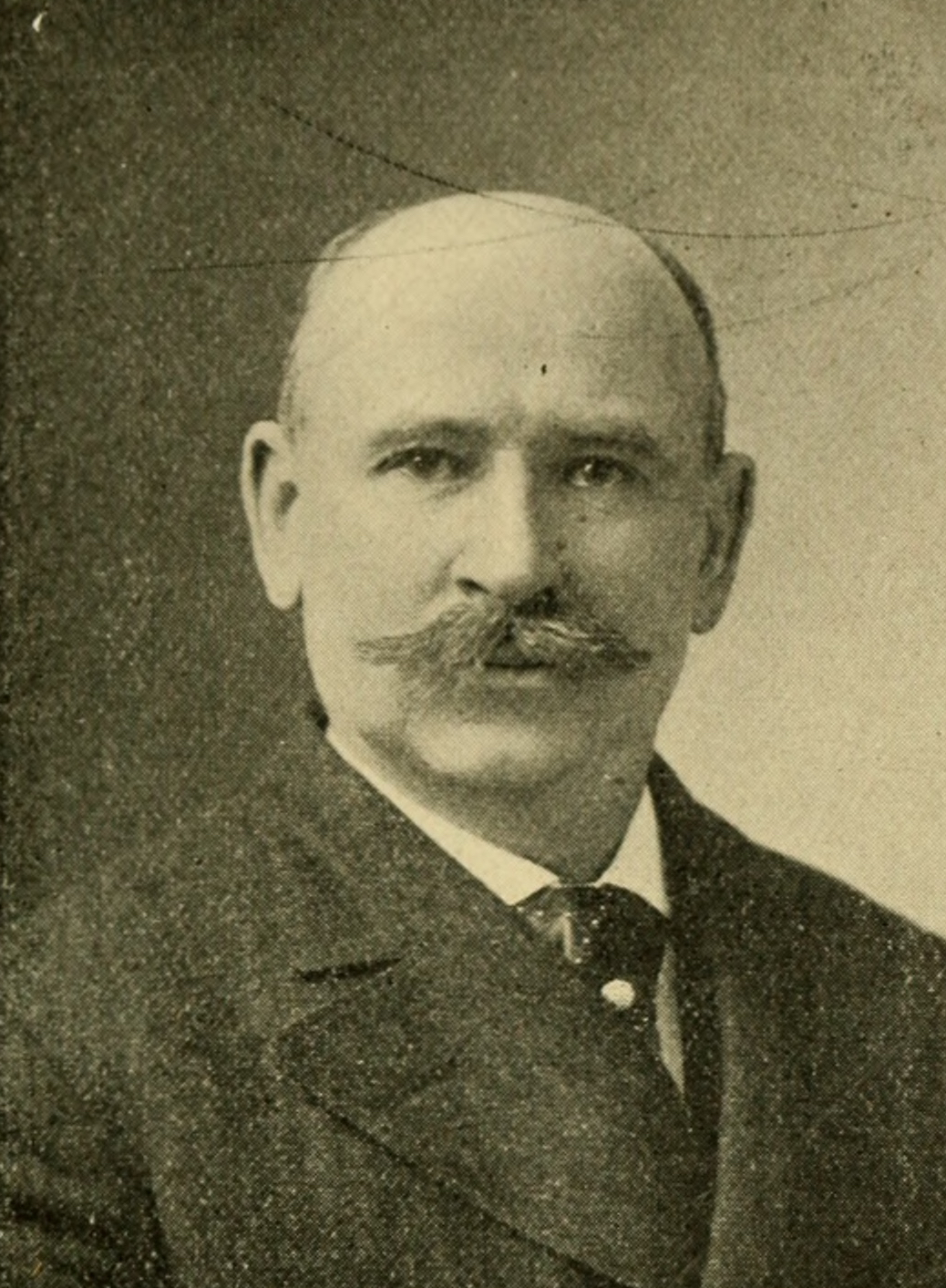
Faxon in 1908

William Otis Faxon (October 24, 1853 – November 12, 1942) was an American politician. He served in the State Senate and the Massachusetts House of Representatives.

== Biography ==
William Otis Faxon was born in Stoughton, Massachusetts, on October 24, 1853. He graduated from Boston University School of Medicine in 1876.

He married Susan Reed Wales on July 10, 1878, and they had one son. She died in 1914.

A Republican member, Faxon served in the Massachusetts House of Representatives from 1905 to 1906, and in the State Senate from 1907 to 1908.

He died in Boston on November 12, 1942, aged 89.
