= Arthur D. Norcross =

American politician

Arthur Dickinson Norcross
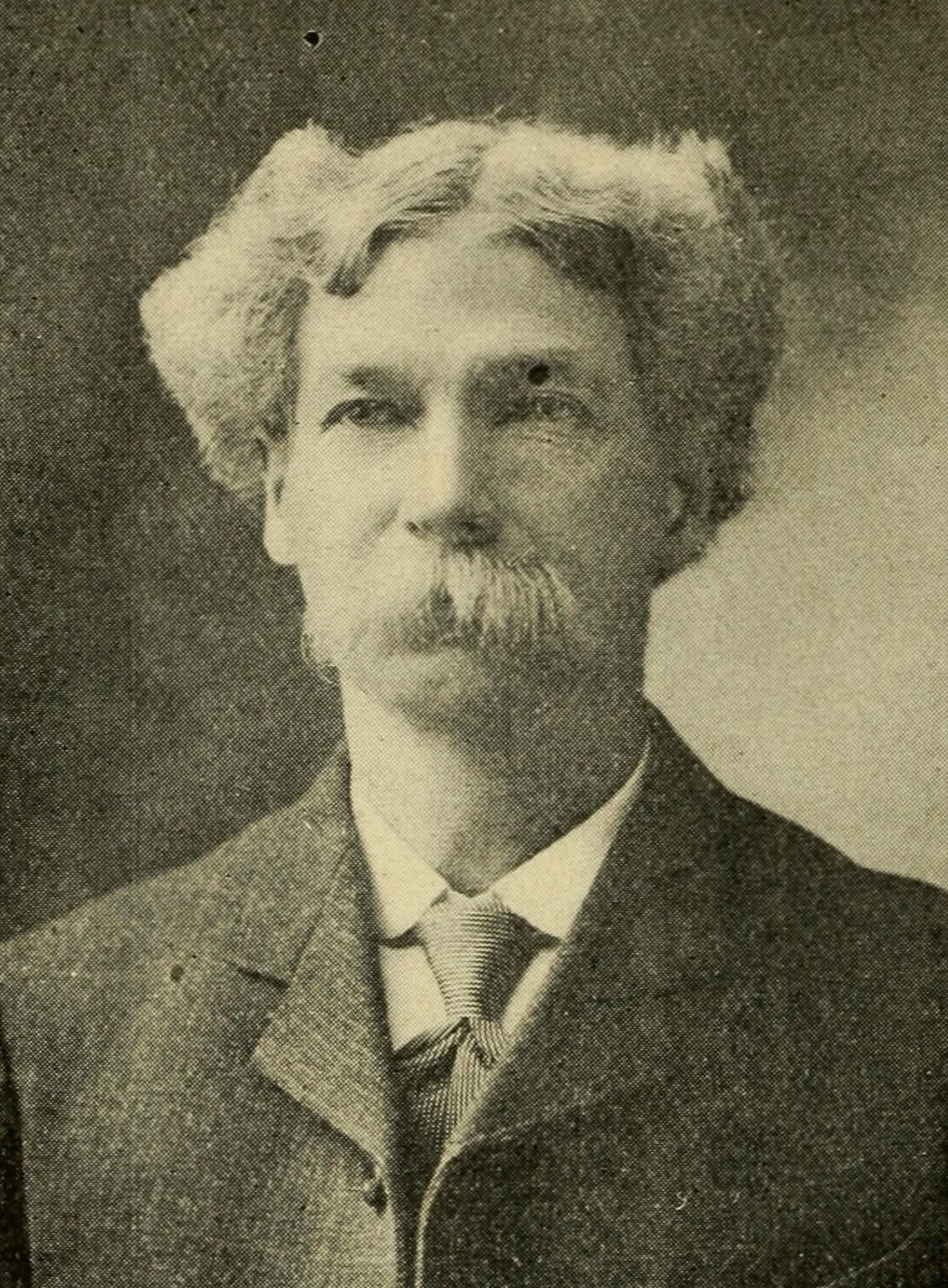

Massachusetts Senate Worcester Hampden District
- In office 1908–1909

Massachusetts House of Representatives 1st Hampden District
- In office 1904–1906

Member of the Monson, Massachusetts Board of Selectmen

Personal details
- Born: November 7, 1848 Monson, Massachusetts
- Died: February 13, 1916 (aged 67) Monson, Massachusetts
- Party: Republican
- Spouse: Augusta V. Kinney
- Children: June born June 19, 1894. Arthur Dickinson Norcross, Jr., born November 8, 1895. Grace Norcross
- Education: Massachusetts Agricultural College class of 1871.
- Profession: Musician

Arthur Dickinson Norcross (1848–1916) was an American musician and politician who served in both branches of the Massachusetts Legislature. He was a first cousin of poet Emily Dickinson.

== See also ==
- 130th Massachusetts General Court (1909)

== Bibliography ==
- Bridgman, Arthur Milnor:, A Souvenir of Massachusetts Legislators, Vol. XIII, (1904) p. 149.
- Cutter, William Richard:, Genealogical and Personal Memoirs Relating to the Families of the State of Massachusetts, Vol. I, (1910) p. 413.
- Who's Who in State Politics, 1908, Practical Politics (1908) p. 72.

Political offices
Preceded by	Member of the Monson, Massachusetts; Board of Selectmen –	Succeeded by
Preceded by	Member of the Massachusetts House of Representatives; 1904–1906	Succeeded by
Preceded by	Member of the Massachusetts Senate; 1908–1909	Succeeded by
