= 1903 United States gubernatorial elections =

- November 3, 1903; April 19, 1904 (LA)

8 governorships
| | Majority party | Minority party |
|---|---|---|
| Party | Republican | Democratic |
| Seats before | 27 | 17 |
| Seats after | 27 | 17 |
| Seat change | Steady | Steady |
| Seats up | 3 | 5 |
| Seats won | 3 | 5 |
| | Third party |
| Party | Silver |
| Seats before | 1 |
| Seats after | 1 |
| Seat change | Steady |
| Seats up | 0 |
| Seats won | 0 |
- Democratic gain Democratic hold Republican gain Republican hold

United States gubernatorial elections were held in 1903, in eight states.

Kentucky, Louisiana, Maryland and Mississippi held their gubernatorial elections in odd numbered years, every 4 years, preceding the United States presidential election year. Massachusetts and Rhode Island both elected their respective governors to a single-year term. They would abandon in 1920 and 1912, respectively. Ohio at this time held gubernatorial elections in every odd numbered year.

In Iowa, following a 1904 amendment to the constitution which moved the election schedule, the governor's term was lengthened to three years. Elections would be held in even-numbered years from the 1906 elections.

== Results ==
| State | Incumbent | Party | Status | Opposing candidates |
|---|---|---|---|---|
| Iowa | Albert B. Cummins | Republican | Re-elected, 57.14% | J. B. Sullivan (Democratic) 38.22% John F. Hanson (Prohibition) 2.96% John M. Work (Socialist) 1.54% Luman H. Weller (People's) 0.14% |
| Kentucky | J. C. W. Beckham | Democratic | Re-elected, 52.12% | Morris B. Belknap (Republican) 46.17% T. P. Demaree (Prohibition) 1.10% Alfred Schmitz (Socialist Labor) 0.47% Adam Nagel (Socialist) 0.14% |
| Louisiana (held, 19 April 1904) | William Wright Heard | Democratic | Term-limited, Democratic victory | Newton C. Blanchard (Democratic) 89.04% W. J. Behan (Republican) 10.96% |
| Maryland | John Walter Smith | Democratic | Retired, Democratic victory | Edwin Warfield (Democratic) 52.02% Stevenson A. Williams (Republican) 45.97% William Gisriel (Prohibition) 1.40% S. M. Crabill (Socialist) 0.62% |
| Massachusetts | John L. Bates | Republican | Re-elected, 50.36% | William A. Gaston (Democratic) 41.29% John C. Chase (Socialist) 6.37% Thomas F. Brennan (Socialist Labor) 1.15% Oliver W. Cobb (Prohibition) 0.83% |
| Mississippi | Andrew H. Longino | Democratic | Term-limited, Democratic victory | James K. Vardaman (Democratic) 100.00% (Democratic primary run-off results); James K. Vardaman 53.42% F. A. Critz 46.58% |
| Ohio | George K. Nash | Republican | Retired, Republican victory | Myron T. Herrick (Republican) 54.89% Tom L. Johnson (Democratic) 41.76% Nelson D. Creamer (Prohibition) 1.56% Isaac Cowan (Socialist) 1.55% John D. Goerke (Socialist Labor) 0.24% |
| Rhode Island | Lucius F. C. Garvin | Democratic | Re-elected, 49.29% | Samuel Pomeroy Colt (Republican) 47.19% William O. Angilly (Socialist Labor) 1.52% Frederick T. Jencks (Prohibition) 1.51% James E. Furlong (Socialist) 0.49% |
