= 1905 United States gubernatorial elections =

← 1904	November 7, 1905	1906 →

4 governorships
	Majority party	Minority party
Party	Republican	Democratic
Seats before	26 (Note: The Colorado legislature removed Colorado Governor Alva Adams (D) from office in March 1905 over alleged electoral fraud, replacing him with James Hamilton Peabody (R) on condition he immediately resign, whereupon he was succeeded by Lieutenant Governor Jesse Fuller McDonald (R).)	18
Seats after	26	18
Seat change	Steady	Steady
Seats up	2	2
Seats won	2	2
	Third party
Party	Silver
Seats before	1
Seats after	1
Seat change	Steady
Seats up	0
Seats won	0
- Democratic gain Democratic hold Republican gain Republican hold

United States gubernatorial elections were held on November 7, 1905, in four states. Virginia holds its gubernatorial elections in odd numbered years, every 4 years, following the United States presidential election year. Massachusetts and Rhode Island at this time held gubernatorial elections every year. They would abandon in 1920 and 1912, respectively.

In Ohio, following a 1905 amendment to the constitution which moved the election schedule, the governor's term was lengthened to three years. Elections would be held in even-numbered years from the 1908 elections.

== Results ==
State	Incumbent	Party	Status	Opposing candidates
Massachusetts	William L. Douglas	Democratic	Retired, Republican victory	Curtis Guild Jr. (Republican) 50.46% Charles W. Bartlett (Democratic) 44.70% James F. Carey (Socialist) 3.29% Willard O. Wylie (Prohibition) 0.84% William H. Carroll (Socialist Labor) 0.71%
Ohio	Myron T. Herrick	Republican	Defeated, 45.98%	John M. Pattison (Democratic) 50.53% Isaac Cowan (Socialist) 1.90% Aaron S. Watkins (Prohibition) 1.40% John E. Seitger (Socialist Labor) 0.19%
Rhode Island	George H. Utter	Republican	Re-elected, 53.30%	Lucius F. C. Garvin (Democratic) 43.95% Bernan E. Helme (Prohibition) 1.50% Thomas F. Herrick (Socialist Labor) 0.63% Warren A. Carpenter (Socialist) 0.62%
Virginia	Andrew Jackson Montague	Democratic	Term-limited, Democratic victory	Claude Augustus Swanson (Democratic) 64.51% Lunsford L. Lewis (Republican) 35.09% B. D. Downey (Socialist Labor) 0.35% Scattering 0.06%
