= George T. Marye Jr. =

American banker and diplomat (1849–1933)

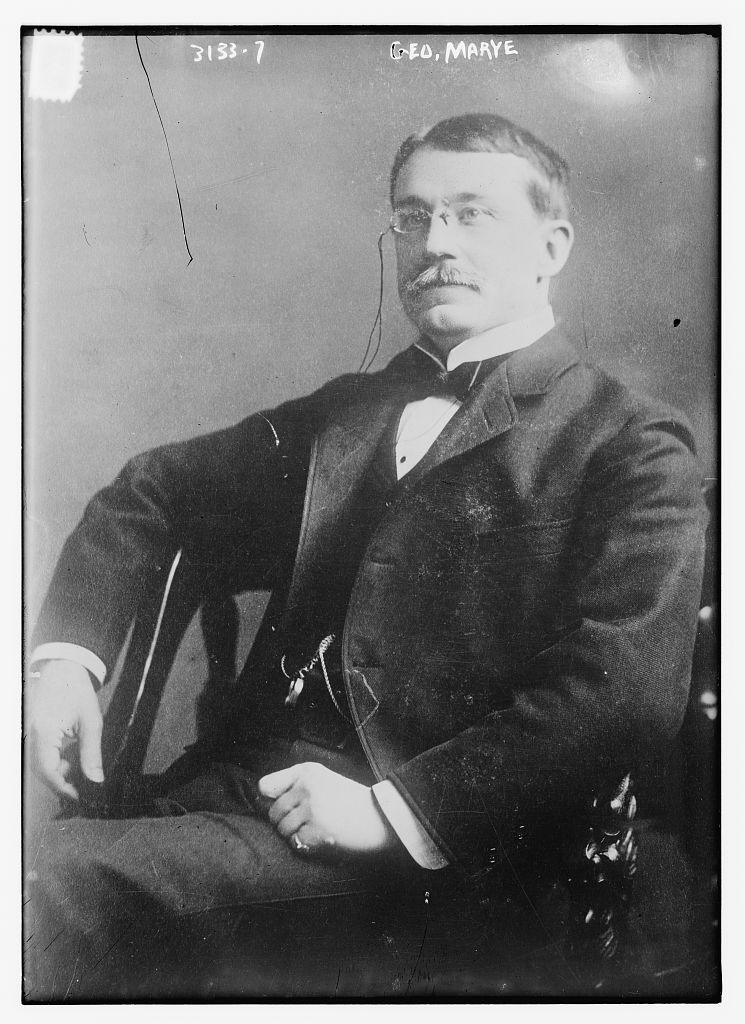
- Marye, c. 1910–1915

United States Ambassador to Russia
- In office October 30, 1914 – March 29, 1916
- President: Woodrow Wilson
- Preceded by: Curtis Guild
- Succeeded by: David R. Francis

Personal details
- Born: December 13, 1849 Baltimore, Maryland, U.S.
- Died: September 2, 1933 (aged 83) Washington, D.C., U.S.
- Resting place: Cypress Lawn Memorial Park, California
- Education: Cambridge University (LL.B)
- Profession: Banker
- Awards: Order of Saint Alexander Nevsky

George Thomas Marye Jr. (December 13, 1849 – September 2, 1933) was an American banker from San Francisco, appointed Ambassador to Russia by President Woodrow Wilson.

== Biography ==
He was born on December 13, 1849, to George Thomas Marye Sr, in Baltimore, and studied at Cambridge University, graduating with first-class honors in 1872.

Arriving in Petrograd 18 months after Ambassador Curtis Guild had left post, he tried to renegotiate the 1832 trade treaty. He served during the first half of the First World War and witnessed the beginning of the end of the Romanov dynasty. In 1929, he published his journals under the title, Russia Observed: Nearing the End in Imperial Russia, containing observations of the Romanov family, Rasputin, and the Russian upper classes.

He died on September 2, 1933, in Washington, D.C.

Diplomatic posts
Preceded by Henry M. Pindell	United States Ambassador to Russia; 1914–1916	Succeeded by David R. Francis
