= Pindell =

Pindell is a surname. Notable people with the surname include:

- Henry M. Pindell (1860–1924), American journalist, businessman, and politician
- Howardena Pindell (born 1943), American artist, curator, and educator
- Terry Pindell, American travel writer
