= 1902 Massachusetts gubernatorial election =

- November 4, 1902
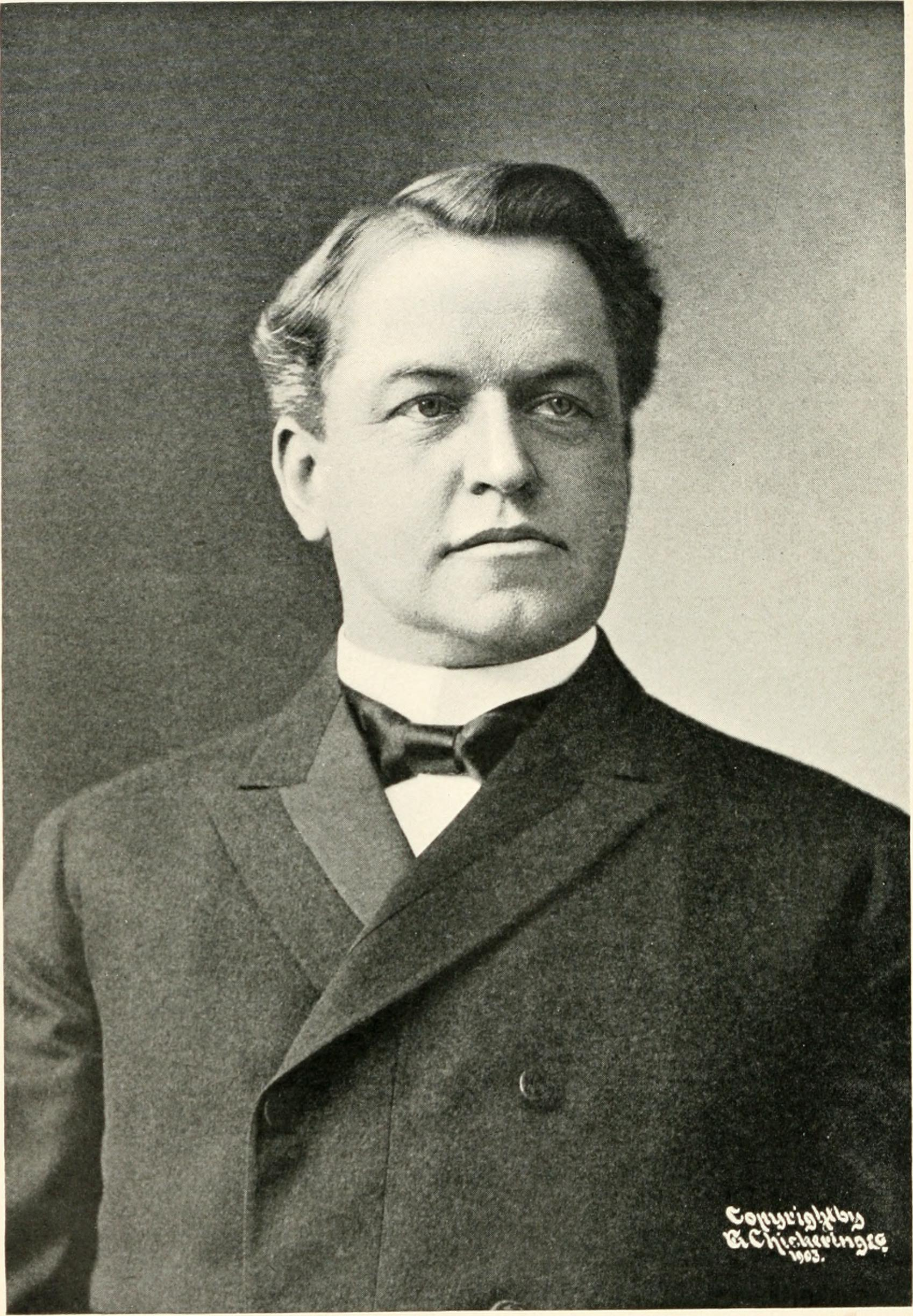

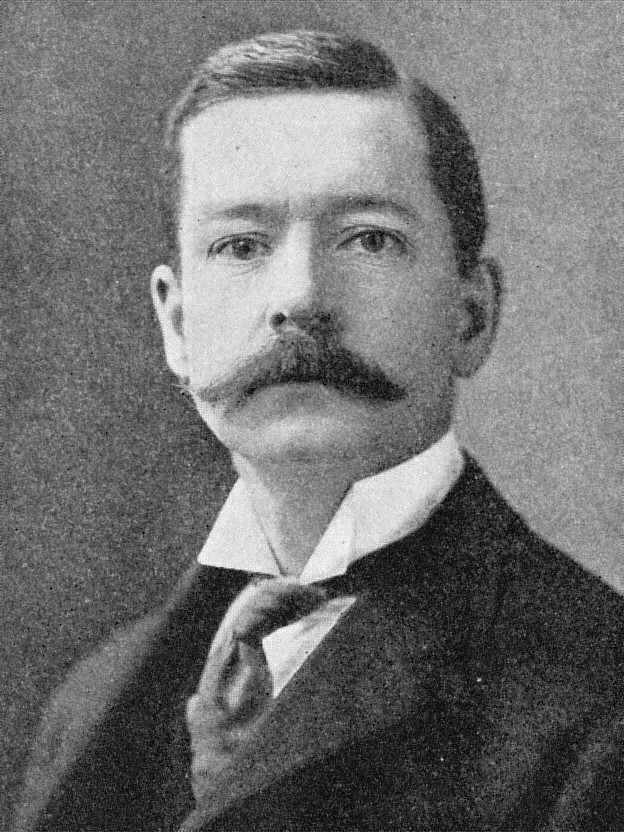

| Nominee | John L. Bates | William A. Gaston | John C. Chase |
| Party | Republican | Democratic | Socialist |
| Popular vote | 196,276 | 159,156 | 33,629 |
| Percentage | 49.23% | 39.92% | 8.44% |
- Bates: 40-50% 50–60% 60–70% 70–80% 80–90% >90% Gaston: 40-50% 50–60% 60–70% Tie: 40-50%
Governor before election
W. Murray Crane
Republican
Elected Governor
John L. Bates
Republican

The 1902 Massachusetts gubernatorial election was held on November 4, 1902. Incumbent Republican Governor W. Murray Crane did not run for re-election. Lt. Governor John L. Bates was elected to succeed him, defeating Democratic nominee William A. Gaston and Socialist John C. Chase.

This election was the first in which the newly formed Socialist Party of America fielded a candidate and Chase's 8.44% remains the largest vote any Socialist candidate for Governor has received as of 2026.

== Party nominations ==
Lieutenant Governor John L. Bates was nominated by the Republican party by acclamation. William A. Gaston defeated Charles Sumner Hamlin 1004 votes to 232 votes at the Democratic convention.

== General election ==
=== Governor ===
- John L. Bates, lieutenant governor of Massachusetts (Republican)
- Michael T. Berry (Socialist Labor)
- John C. Chase, former mayor of Haverhill (Socialist)
- William A. Gaston, banker and son of former governor William Gaston (Democratic)
- William H. Partridge (Prohibition)

=== Results ===
1902 Massachusetts gubernatorial election
| Party | Candidate | Votes | % | ±% |
|---|---|---|---|---|
| Republican | John L. Bates | 196,276 | 49.23% | ▼8.03 |
| Democratic | William A. Gaston | 159,156 | 39.92% | ▲4.68 |
| Socialist | John C. Chase | 33,629 | 8.44% | N/A |
| Socialist Labor | Michael T. Berry | 6,079 | 1.53% | ▼1.21 |
| Prohibition | William H. Partridge | 3,538 | 0.89% | ▼0.58 |
| Write-in | All others | 11 | 0.00% | Steady |
| Total votes | | 398,689 | 100.00% | |

== See also ==
- 1902 Massachusetts legislature

== Bibliography ==
- Office of the Secretary of the Commonwealth (1910). Election Statistics, 1902. Boston, MA: Wright & Potter Printing Co., State Printers.
