= Camp Guild =

Early National Guard base

Coordinates: 42.679°N 70.992°W

Camp Guild is a former World War I mobilization camp that existed in 1917 in Boxford, Massachusetts. It was named for Curtis Guild Jr., the governor of Massachusetts (1906–1909). Established in World War I and used for an unspecified time thereafter for mustering Massachusetts National Guard troops. In 1926 Camp Curtis Guild was acquired and named by the Commonwealth at another location, thus this camp was presumably defunct by then.

== See also ==
- List of military installations in Massachusetts
