= Charles W. Bartlett (lawyer) =

American lawyer (1845–1916)

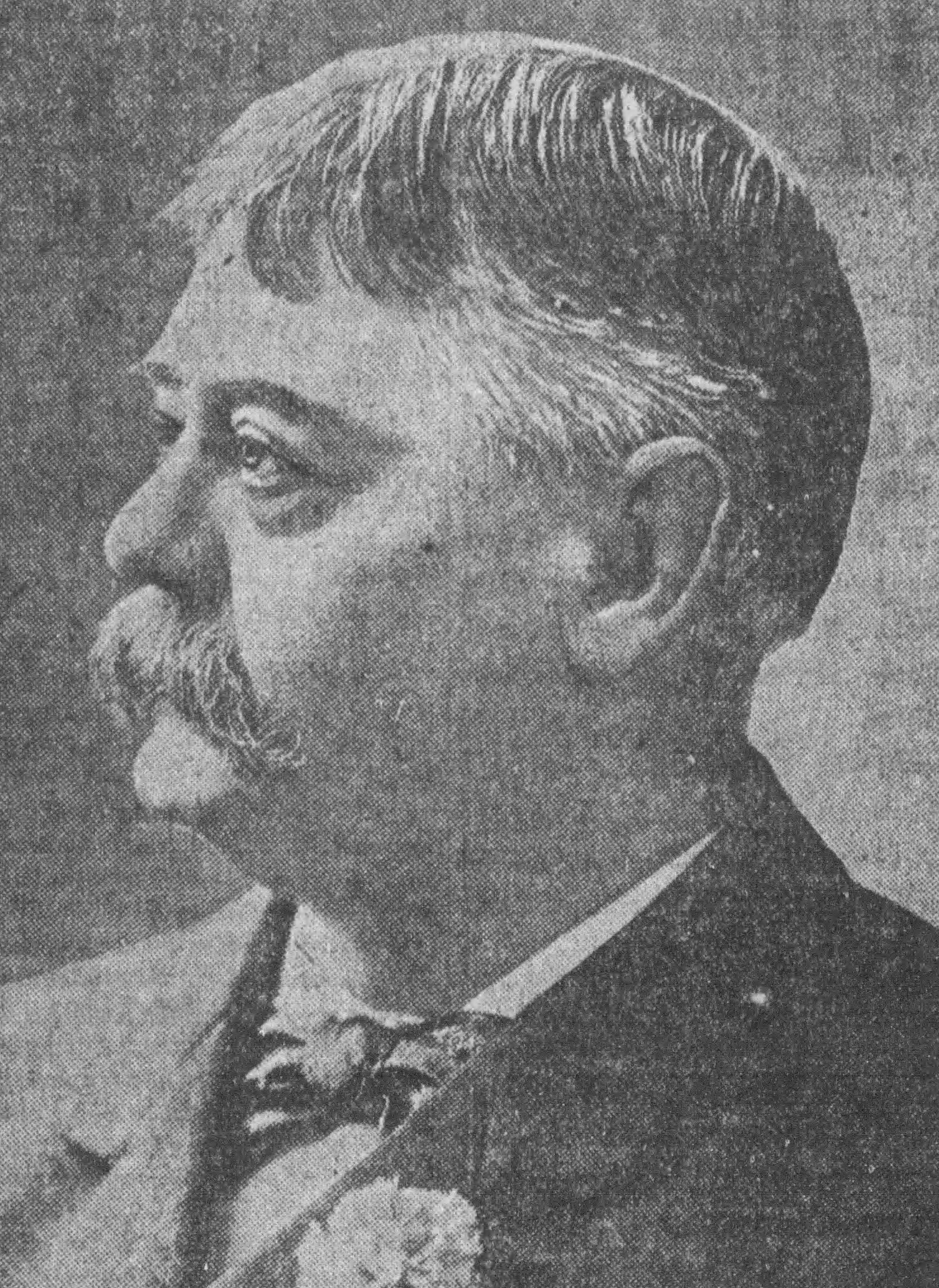
- Born: August 12, 1845; Boston, Massachusetts, U.S.
- Died: December 6, 1916 (aged 71); Newtonville, Massachusetts, U.S.
- Education: Dartmouth College; Albany Law School (1871)
- Political party: Democratic Party

Democratic nominee for Governor of Massachusetts
- In office 1905
- Preceded by: William Lewis Douglas
- Succeeded by: John B. Moran

Charles W. Bartlett (August 12, 1845 – December 6, 1916) was an American lawyer and politician who was the Democratic nominee for Governor of Massachusetts in 1905 and represented Warry Charles and Charles R. Eastman during their murder trials.

== Early life ==
Bartlett was born on August 12, 1845, in Boston. He resided in Lee, New Hampshire, and Durham, New Hampshire, during his youth. He received some private tutoring in Lee and attended an academy in Hanover, New Hampshire. In 1861, the American Civil War broke out and 16-year old was allowed by his father to enter the Union Army. He enlisted in Co. A. of the 5th Massachusetts Militia Regiment. He returned to Durham after his term of enlistment ended and pressed and harvested hay and worked on bridge and dam construction projects to earn money for college. In 1865, Bartlett was admitted to Dartmouth College. Due to his limited financial means, Bartlett taught in Truro, Massachusetts, Wellfleet, Massachusetts, and South Gardner, Massachusetts, in order to afford tuition. He also worked on the family farm during school breaks. After graduating from Dartmouth, Bartlett taught at Salmon Falls High School in order to earn money for his legal studies. In 1871 he graduated from Albany Law School and was admitted to the New York bar.

== Legal career ==
Bartlett returned to Durham, where he entered a law partnership with Samuel Wheeler. He then moved to Boston, where he spent 13 years as an associate of Napoleon B. Bryant. Following Bryant's retirement, Bartlett entered the partnership of Bartlett & Gage. In 1891, the firm's name was changed to Bartlett & Anderson.

In 1901, Bartlett defended Museum of Comparative Zoology curator Charles R. Eastman, who was accused of murdering his brother-in-law Richard H. Grogan Jr. Eastman claimed that the shooting was accidental and was found not guilty.

In 1903, Bartlett was on the defense team of Charlie Chin and Wong Chung, two Chinese immigrants accused of murdering Hip Sing Association member Wong Yak Chung. Although there were numerous eyewitnesses who identified Tow Kang, a member of the rival On Leong Chinese Merchants Association, as the shooter, Chin and Chung were found guilty. In 1907, Bartlett and Harvey H. Pratt defended nine alleged Hip Sing members accused of committing murders in retaliation for Wong Yak Chung's slaying as well as well-known Boston businessman and Hip Sing leader Warry Charles, who was indicted for being an accessory before the fact. All nine (one died during the trial) of the men were found guilty, but four of the men's convictions were overturned due to insufficient evidence. Bartlett and Pratt appealed the case to the Massachusetts Supreme Judicial Court on the grounds that a should have been allowed to testify that a police officer and a Chinese interpreter had conspired to bribe prosecution witnesses. The Court ruled against the defendants and the men were sentenced to death. The first three defendants scheduled to be executed chose not to petition for commutation of their sentence, as they preferred execution to life in prison. Pratt and Bartlett petitioned for commutation for the other two defendants, Warry Charles and Joe Guey and sixteen days before their scheduled executions, Governor Eben Sumner Draper announced that he had accepted the Massachusetts Governor's Council's recommendation to commute Charles and Guey's death sentences to life imprisonment.

== Politics ==
In 1905, Bartlett was appointed judge advocate general by Governor William Lewis Douglas. Douglas did not run for reelection and Bartlett was the Democratic nominee in the 1905 Massachusetts gubernatorial election. Bartlett lost to Republican Curtis Guild Jr. 50% to 45%.

Bartlett was a candidate for Governor in 1907. At the October 10, 1907, Democratic convention, delegates for Bartlett's opponent, Henry Melville Whitney, gained control of the convention hall and barred Bartlett delegates from entry. The Bartlett delegates assembled themselves to nominate their candidate and adopt their own platform. Bartlett's supporters were generally aligned with the presidential campaign of William Jennings Bryan, while Whitney's were in opposition to Bryan's third campaign for the Democratic nomination. Bartlett and Whitney also split on the proposed merger of the New York, New Haven and Hartford Railroad and Boston and Maine Corporation, which Bartlett opposed and Whitney supported. On October 18, the Massachusetts Ballot Law Commission ruled that Whitney was the Democratic nominee. Bartlett however remained in the race as the head of the “Anti-Merger” ticket. Bartlett finished fourth in the general election, receiving 3% of the vote to Guild's 50%, Whitney's 23%, and the Independence League's Thomas Hisgen's 20%.

== Personal life ==
Bartlett married Mary L. Morrison of Franklin, New Hampshire. They had one son and one daughter. Mary Bartlett died in 1882. On August 7, 1897, Bartlett married Suffolk Superior Court stenographer Annie M. White. Bartlett resided in South Boston and Roxbury before moving to Dorchester. His Dorchester home at 39 Melville Street had 17-rooms and was located on 24,501 square feet of land. He sold the home to Charles F. Riordan in 1906 and moved to Newtonville, Massachusetts. Bartlett died of pneumonia on December 6, 1916, at his home in Newtonville. He had been in ill health for the three years preceding his death.

Party political offices
Preceded by William Lewis Douglas	Democratic nominee for Governor of Massachusetts; 1905	Succeeded by John B. Moran
