= 1926 Massachusetts gubernatorial election =

- November 2, 1926
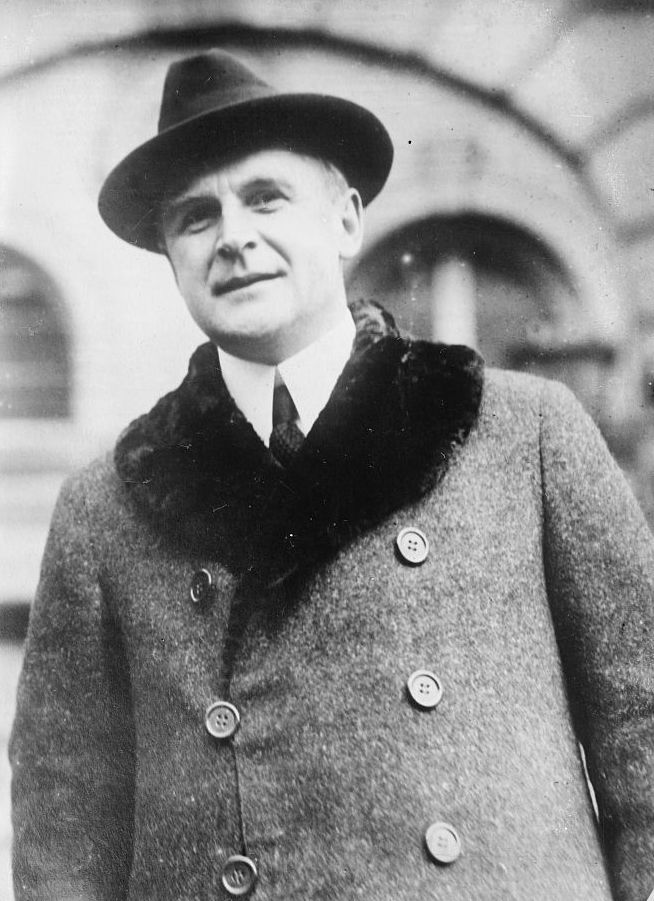

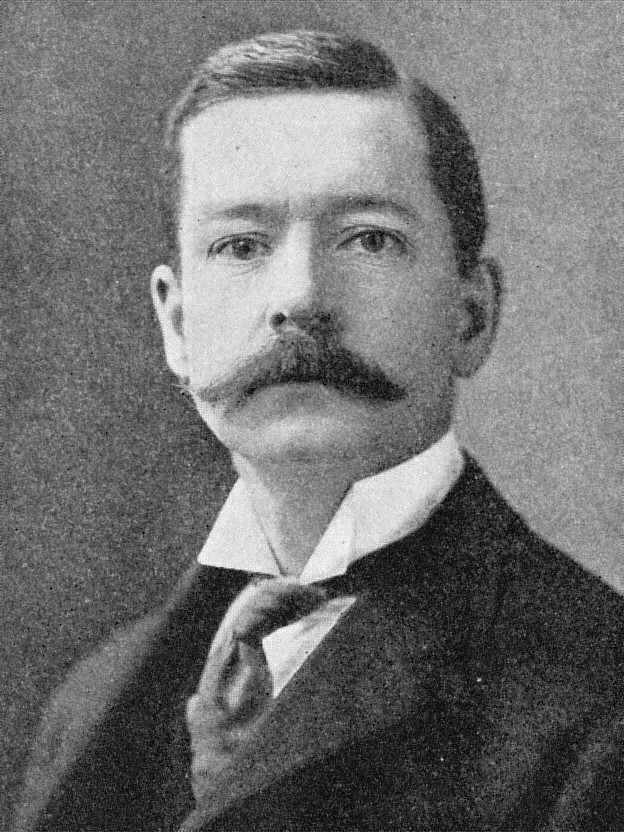
Nominee	Alvan T. Fuller	William A. Gaston
Party	Republican	Democratic
Popular vote	595,006	407,389
Percentage	58.76%	40.25%
- Fuller: 40-50% 50–60% 60–70% 70–80% 80–90% >90% Gaston: 50–60% 60–70% 70–80% Tie: 50%
Governor before election
Alvan T. Fuller
Republican
Elected Governor
Alvan T. Fuller
Republican

The 1926 Massachusetts gubernatorial election was held on November 2, 1926.

Incumbent Republican Governor Alvan T. Fuller was elected over Democrat William A. Gaston. This was Gaston's third and final unsuccessful bid for governor.

== Republican primary ==
=== Governor ===
==== Candidates ====
- Alvan T. Fuller, incumbent governor

==== Results ====
Governor Fuller was unopposed for renomination.

1926 Republican gubernatorial primary
Party	Candidate	Votes	%
Republican	Alvan T. Fuller (incumbent)	237,979	100.00%
Write-in	All others	6	0.00%
Total votes		237,985	100.00%

=== Lt. governor ===
==== Candidates ====
- Frank G. Allen, incumbent lieutenant governor

==== Results ====
Allen was unopposed for the Republican nomination.

1926 Republican lt. gubernatorial primary
Party	Candidate	Votes	%
Republican	Frank G. Allen	223,253	100.00%
Write-in	All others	2	0.00%
Total votes		223,255	100.00%

== Democratic primary ==
=== Governor ===
==== Candidates ====
- William A. Gaston, son of former governor William Gaston, nominee for governor in 1908 and 1909, and nominee for United States Senate in 1922

===== Withdrew =====
- John J. Cummings, former member of the Massachusetts House of Representatives and Democratic nominee for lt. governor in 1924

==== Results ====
Gaston was unopposed for the Democratic nomination.

1926 Democratic gubernatorial primary
Party	Candidate	Votes	%
Democratic	William A. Gaston	125,931	99.97%
Write-in	All others	35	0.03%
Total votes		125,966	100.00%

=== Lt. Governor ===
==== Candidates ====
- Joseph B. Ely, former district attorney for the Western District of Massachusetts and candidate for governor in 1922

===== Withdrew =====
- Harry J. Dooley (name remained on primary ballot)

==== Campaign ====
Harry J. Dooley and Joseph B. Ely competed for the Democratic nomination for lieutenant governor. Ely, an unsuccessful candidate for governor in 1922, was tapped by the party leadership so that the party could present an ethnically diverse and geographically balanced ticket. On August 28, Dooley dropped out of the race and endorsed Ely in order to unite the party. As Dooley did not exit the race before the August 13 deadline for withdrawals, his name remained on the ballot. Nevertheless, Dooley ended up winning the primary with the support of Irish Americans. Dooley refused the nomination as did Ely, who believed the means to be an embarrassment (but officially cited his mother's illness as his reason for declining).

Dooley was replaced on the general election ballot by Fall River Mayor Edmond P. Talbot. Party leadership hoped that the popular French-Canadian politician would help the ticket attract votes from the state's 75,000 to 80,000 French-speaking residents, 75% of whom were believed to be Republican supporters.

==== Results ====
1926 Democratic lt. gubernatorial primary
Party	Candidate	Votes	%
Democratic	Harry J. Dooley (withdrew)	51,327	52.86%
Democratic	Joseph B. Ely	45,765	47.14%
Total votes		97,092	100.00%

== General election ==
=== Candidates ===
- Alvan T. Fuller, incumbent governor (Republican)
- William A. Gaston, son of former governor William Gaston, nominee for governor in 1908 and 1909, and nominee for United States Senate in 1922 (Democratic)
- Walter S. Hutchins, perennial candidate (Socialist)
- Samuel Leger, nominee for secretary of the Commonwealth in 1924 (Socialist Labor)
- Lewis Marks (Workers)

=== Results ===
1926 Massachusetts gubernatorial election
Party	Candidate	Votes	%	±%
Republican	Alvan T. Fuller (incumbent)	595,006	58.76%	▲2.76
Democratic	William A. Gaston	407,389	40.25%	▼1.94
Socialist	Walter S. Hutchins	4,750	0.47%	▼0.07
Workers	Lewis Marks	3,006	0.30%	▼0.62
Socialist Labor	Samuel Leger	2,010	0.20%	▼0.22
Write-in	All others	5	0.00%	Steady
Total votes		1,012,166	100.00%	

== See also ==
- 1925–1926 Massachusetts legislature

== Bibliography ==
- Office of the Secretary of the Commonwealth (1926). Election Statistics, 1926. Boston, MA.
