= 1905 Massachusetts gubernatorial election =

- November 7, 1905
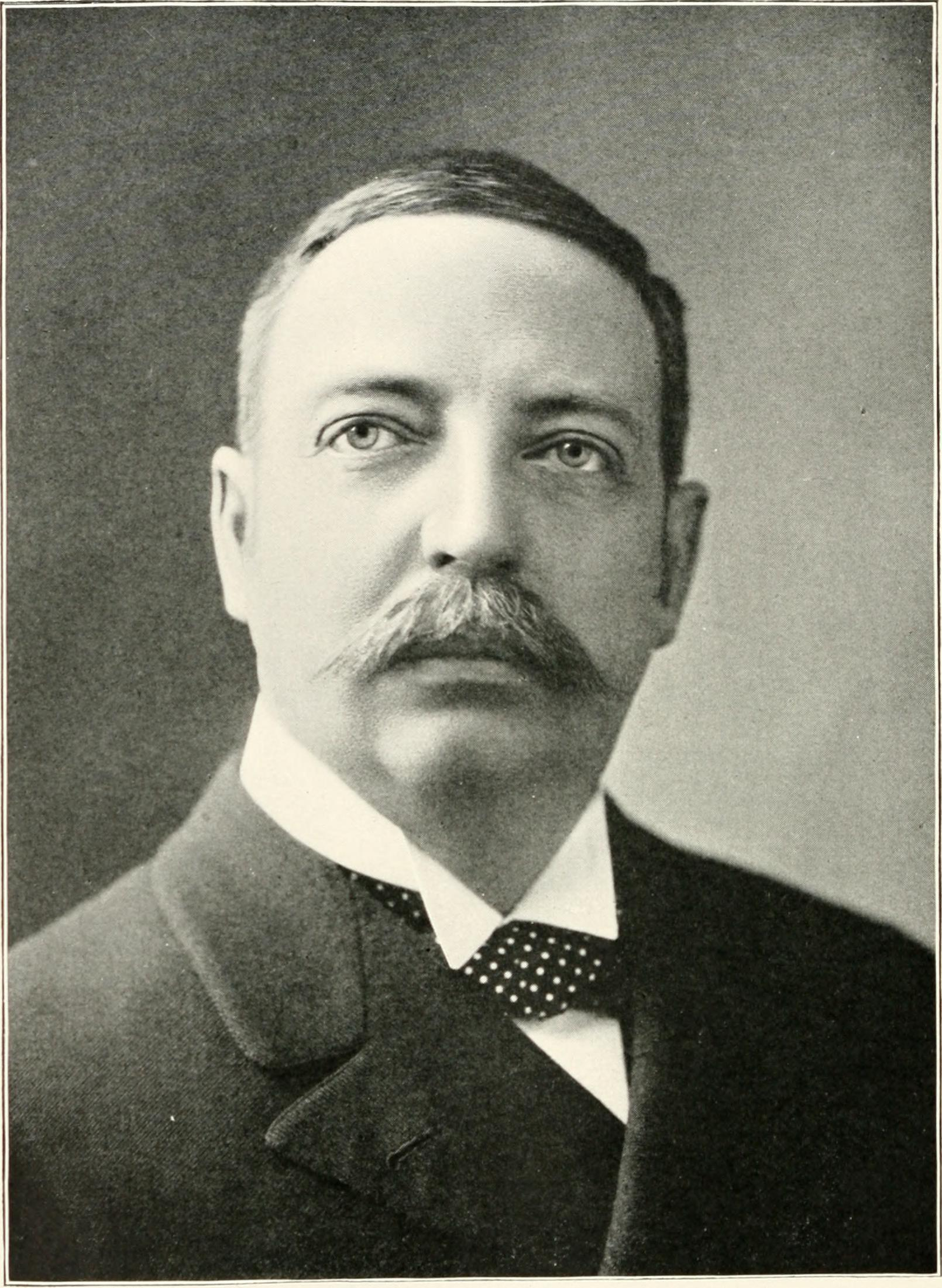

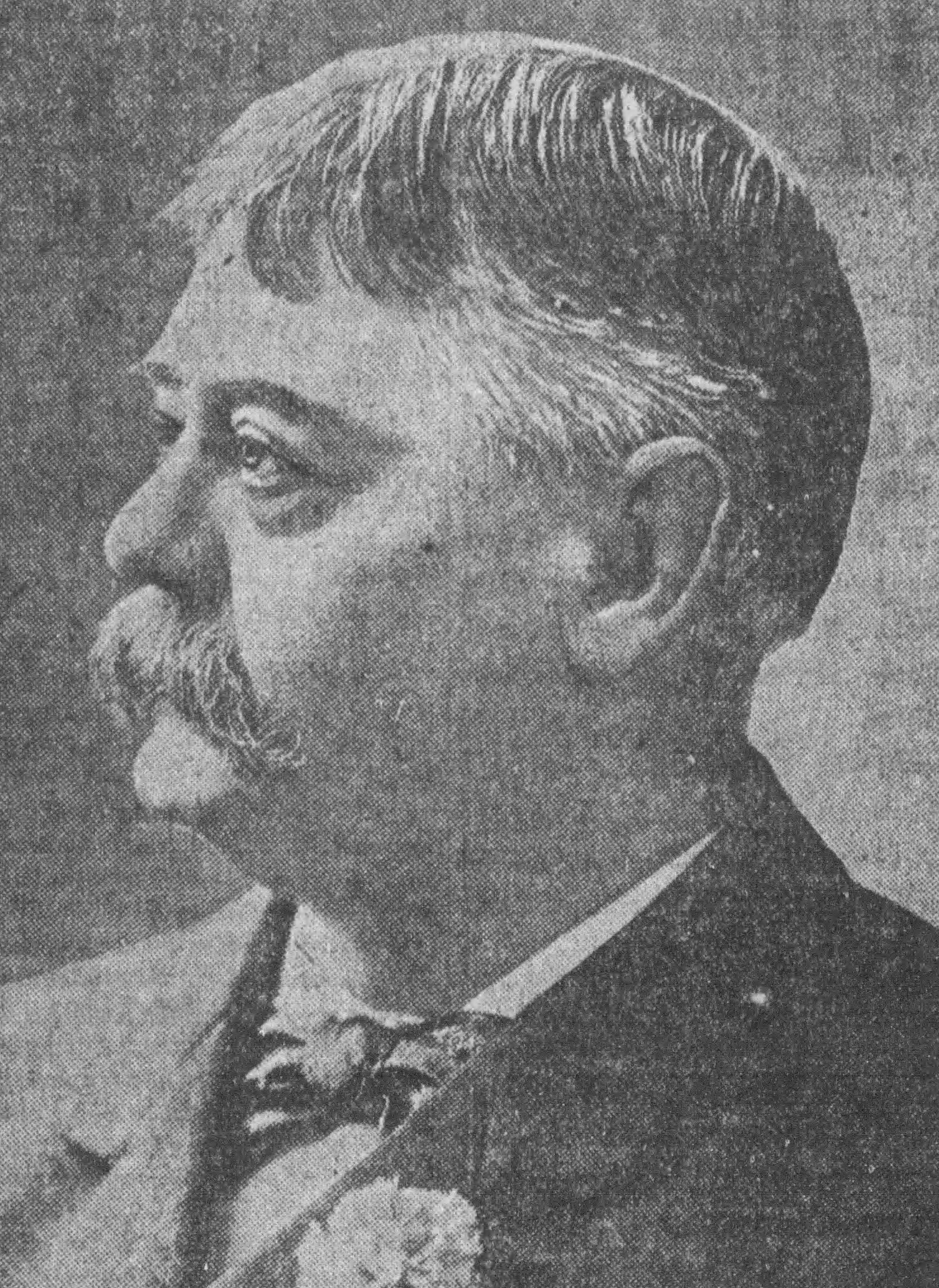
Nominee	Curtis Guild Jr.	Charles W. Bartlett
Party	Republican	Democratic
Popular vote	197,469	174,911
Percentage	50.46%	44.70%
- Guild: 40-50% 50–60% 60–70% 70–80% 80–90% >90% Bartlett: 40-50% 50–60% 60–70% 70–80% Tie: 50%
Governor before election
William L. Douglas
Democratic
Elected Governor
Curtis Guild Jr.
Republican

The 1905 Massachusetts gubernatorial election was held on November 7, 1905. Incumbent Democratic Governor William L. Douglas did not run for re-election. Republican Lt. Governor Curtis Guild Jr. won the open election, defeating attorney Charles W. Bartlett.

== General election ==
=== Candidates ===
- Charles W. Bartlett, Boston defense attorney (Democratic)
- James F. Carey, former state representative from Haverhill (Socialist)
- William H. Carroll (Socialist Labor)
- Curtis Guild Jr., lieutenant governor of Massachusetts (Republican)
- Willard O. Wylie (Prohibition)

=== Results ===
1905 Massachusetts gubernatorial election
Party	Candidate	Votes	%	±%
Republican	Curtis Guild Jr.	197,469	50.46%	▲6.32
Democratic	Charles W. Bartlett	174,911	44.70%	▼7.44
Socialist	James F. Carey	12,874	3.29%	▲0.71
Prohibition	Willard O. Wylie	3,286	0.84%	▲0.14
Socialist Labor	William H. Carroll	2,774	0.71%	▼0.26
Write-in	All others	7	0.00%	Steady
Total votes		391,321	100.00%	

== See also ==
- 1905 Massachusetts legislature
