= 1904 Massachusetts gubernatorial election =

- November 8, 1904
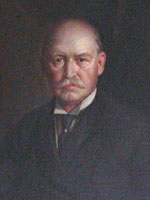

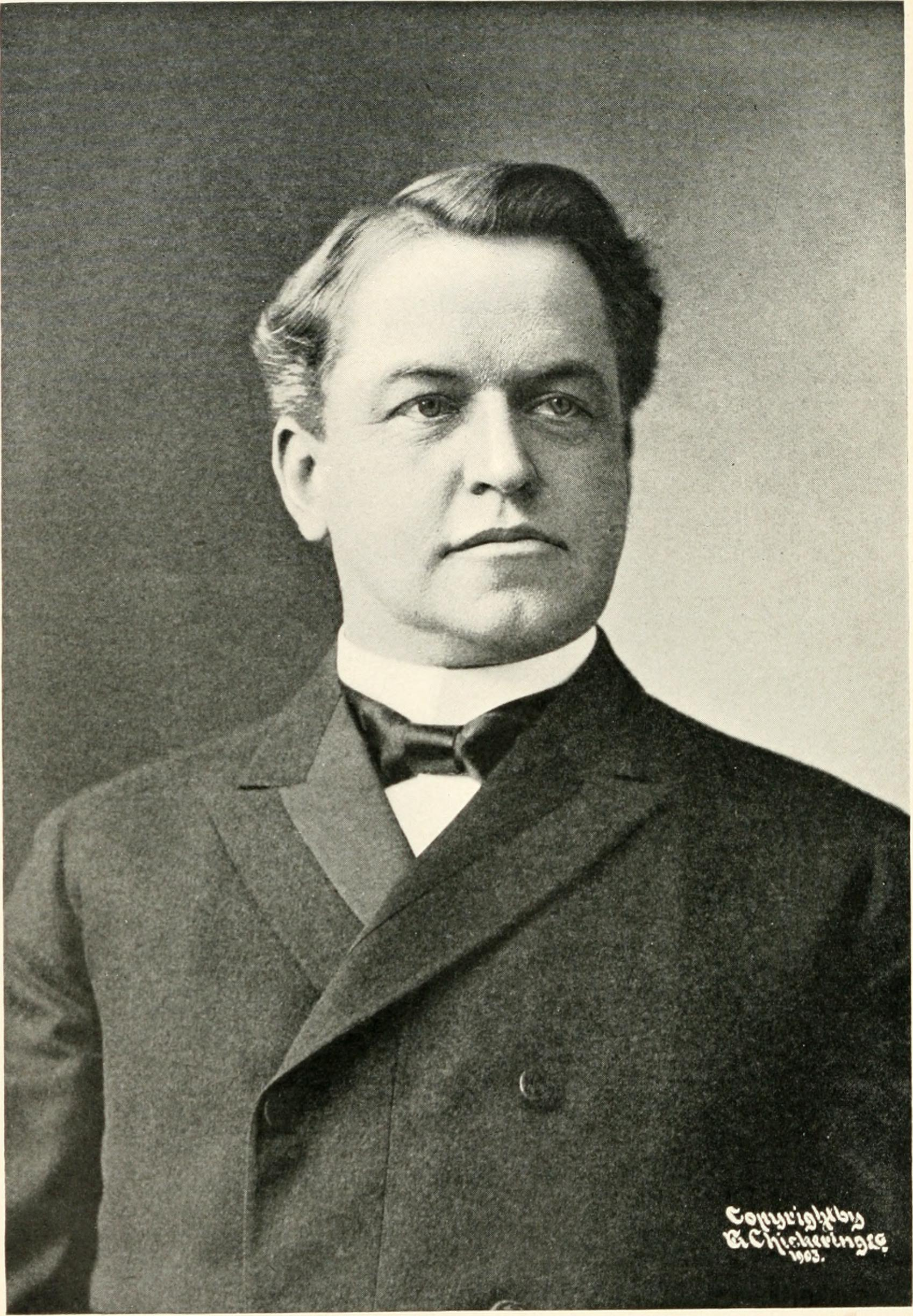
Nominee	William L. Douglas	John L. Bates
Party	Democratic	Republican
Popular vote	234,670	198,681
Percentage	52.14%	44.14%
- Douglas: 40-50% 50–60% 60–70% 70–80% Bates: 40-50% 50–60% 60–70% 70–80% 80–90% >90% Tie: 40-50%
Governor before election
John L. Bates
Republican
Elected Governor
William L. Douglas
Democratic

The 1904 Massachusetts gubernatorial election was held on November 8, 1904. Incumbent Republican Governor John L. Bates ran for a third term, but was defeated by Democratic nominee William L. Douglas. Despite Douglas’s wide victory, Republican Theodore Roosevelt won the state in a landslide in the concurrent presidential election.

== General election ==
=== Candidates ===
- John Quincy Adams (Socialist)
- John L. Bates, incumbent governor since 1903 (Republican)
- Michael T. Berry (Socialist Labor)
- Oliver W. Cobb (Prohibition)
- William L. Douglas, Brockton shoe manufacturer and former state representative (Democratic)

=== Results ===
1904 Massachusetts gubernatorial election
Party	Candidate	Votes	%	±%
Democratic	William L. Douglas	234,670	52.14%	▲10.85
Republican	John L. Bates (incumbent)	198,681	44.14%	▼6.22
Socialist	John Quincy Adams	11,591	2.58%	▼3.79
Prohibition	Oliver W. Cobb	3,156	0.70%	▼0.13
Socialist Labor	Michael T. Berry	2,002	0.45%	▼0.y70
Write-in	All others	7	0.00%	Steady
Total votes		396,479	100.00%	

== See also ==
- 1904 Massachusetts legislature

== Bibliography ==
- Office of the Secretary of the Commonwealth (1910). Election Statistics, 1904. Boston, MA: Wright & Potter Printing Co., State Printers.
