= 1907 Massachusetts gubernatorial election =

- November 5, 1907
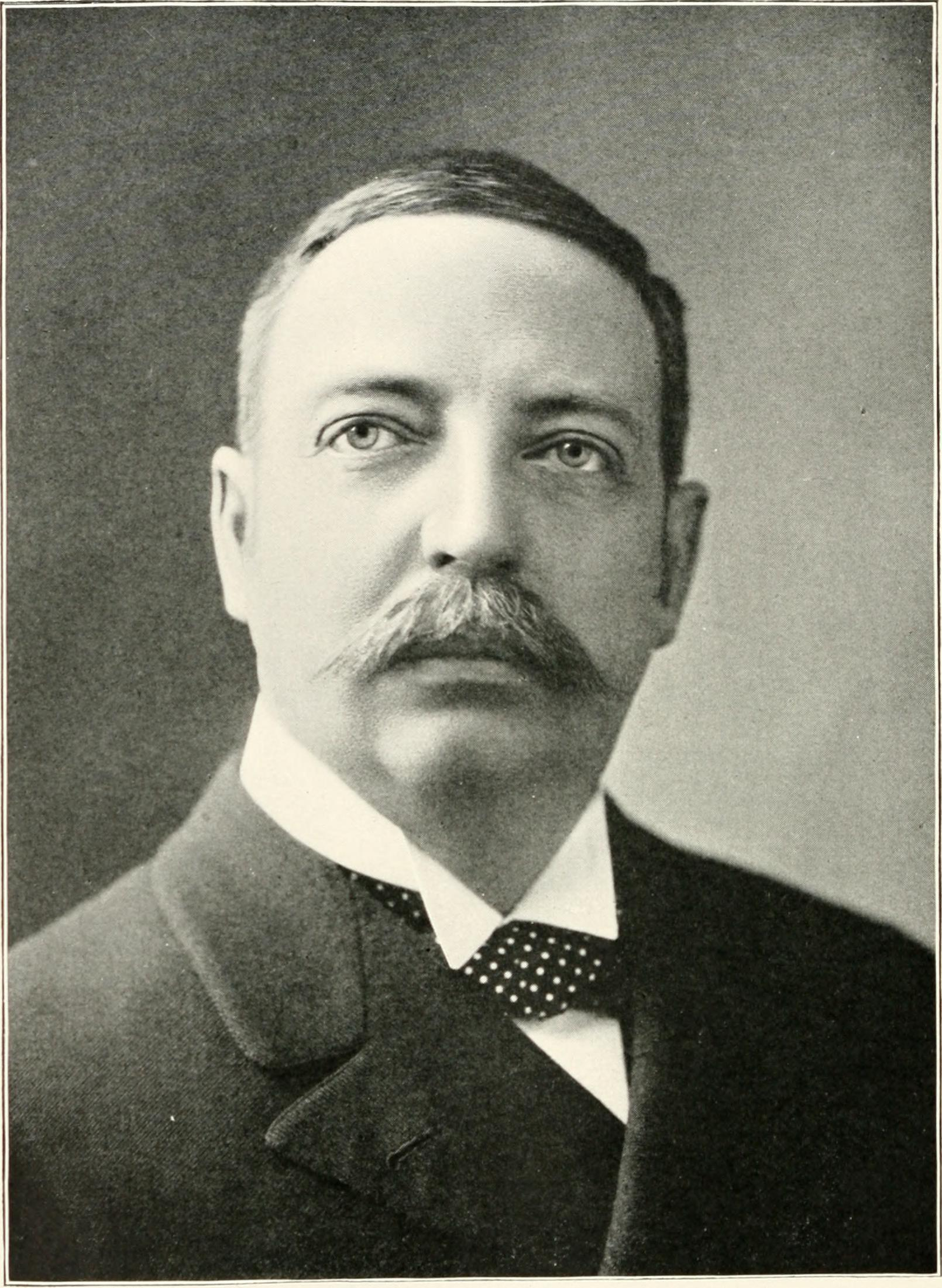

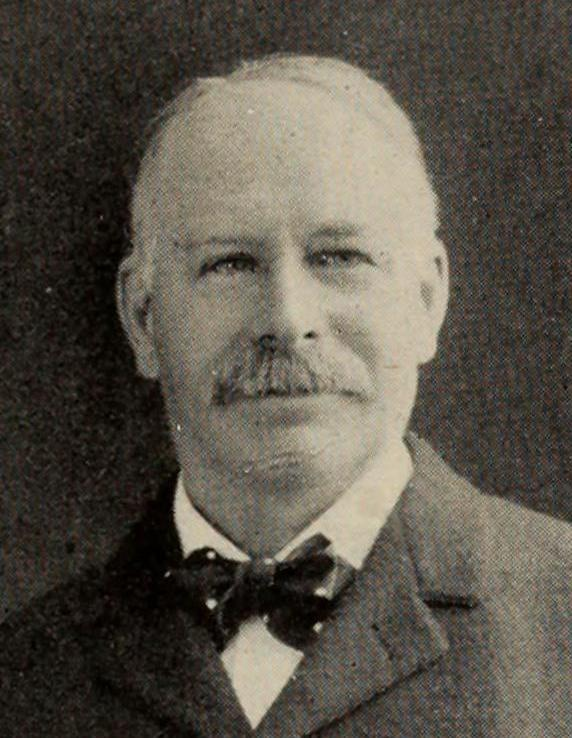

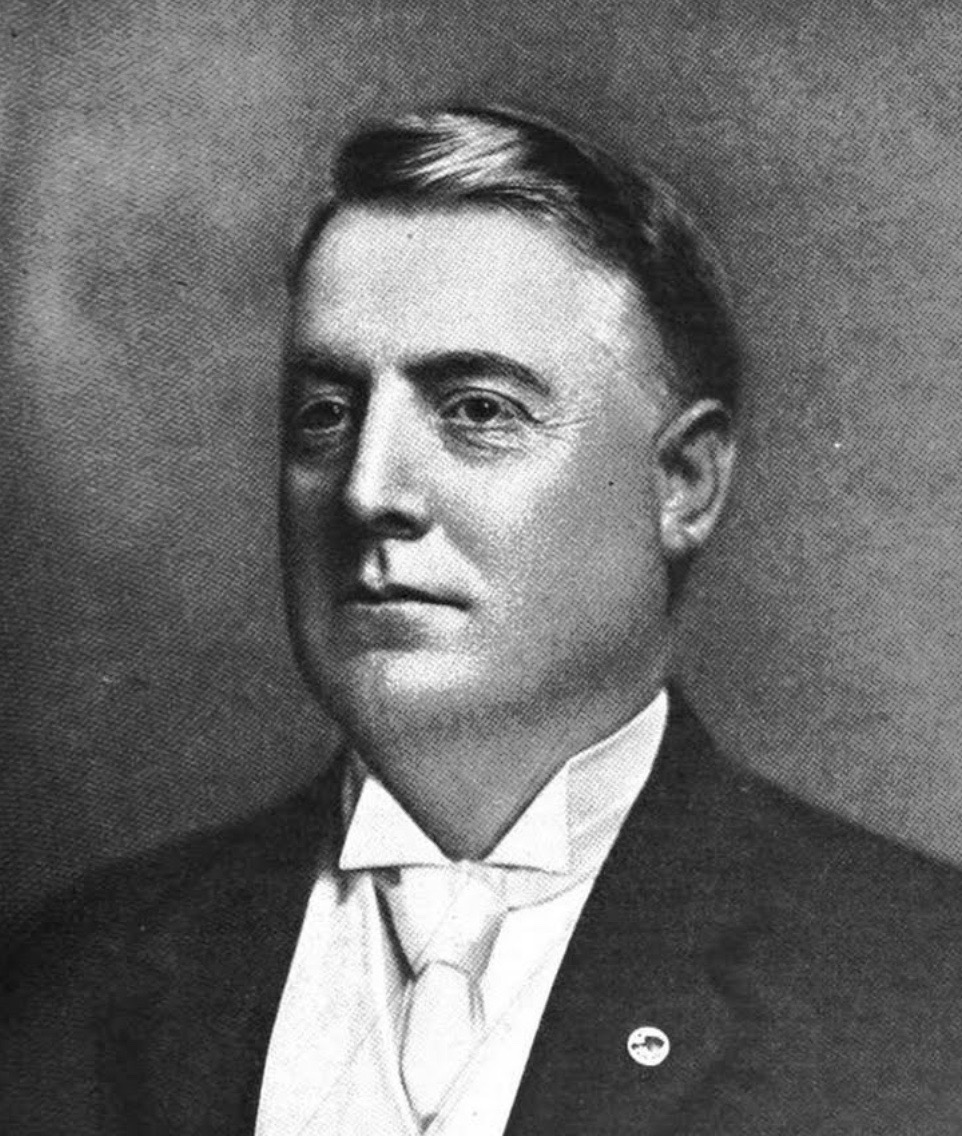
Nominee	Curtis Guild Jr.	Henry M. Whitney	Thomas Hisgen
Party	Republican	Democratic	Independence
Alliance		Independent; Dem. Citizens; Ind. Citizens
Popular vote	188,068	84,379	75,499
Percentage	50.33%	22.58%	20.20%
- Guild: 30-40% 40-50% 50–60% 60–70% 70–80% 80–90% >90% Whitney: 50–60% Hisgen: 40-50%
Governor before election
Curtis Guild, Jr.
Republican
Elected Governor
Curtis Guild, Jr.
Republican

The 1907 Massachusetts gubernatorial election was held on November 5. Incumbent Republican Governor Curtis Guild Jr. was re-elected for a third one-year term.

The election was noted for the split in the Democratic Party and the very strong third-party performance for Independence Party nominee Thomas Hisgen. Hisgen actually received more votes than the Democratic ticket, though Democratic nominee Henry M. Whitney received more votes than Hisgen when considering votes Whitney received on three independent tickets.

== Republican nomination ==
=== Candidates ===
- Curtis Guild Jr., incumbent governor

=== Campaign ===
The contest for the Republican nomination was seen as a referendum on the Roosevelt administration. The Massachusetts political establishment, led by Senator Henry Cabot Lodge and Governor Guild, was solidly in support of Roosevelt, Lodge's close personal friend. Republican critics of Governor Guild included State Senator Arthur M. Taft, over the governor's allegedly insufficient support for the protective tariff.

== Democratic nomination ==
=== Candidates ===
- Charles W. Bartlett, attorney and Democratic nominee for governor in 1905
- Henry Melville Whitney, industrialist and Democratic nominee for lt. governor in 1905

=== Campaign ===
In a poll taken of the Democratic state legislators in May, 25 favored Whitney and eight favored Bartlett, with five scattering and 32 noncommittal.

=== Convention ===
The Democratic convention was held in Springfield on October 5. Whitney delegates gained control of the convention hall and barred Bartlett delegates from entry. The Bartlett delegates assembled themselves to nominate their candidate and adopt their own platform. Bartlett's supporters were generally aligned with the presidential campaign of William Jennings Bryan, while Whitney's were in opposition to Bryan's third campaign for the Democratic nomination. Bartlett supporters also cited seniority and Whitney's support of the merger of the New York, New Haven and Hartford Railroad and Boston and Maine Corporation.

=== Aftermath ===
Whitney's nomination led Grenville MacFarland, the chairman of the Democratic State Committee, to resign his post and his membership in the State Committee. MacFarland felt that Whitney represented corporate interests over "true Democratic principles" in his support of the merger of New York, New Haven and Hartford with Boston and Maine railroads.

== General election ==
=== Candidates ===
- Charles W. Bartlett, attorney and Democratic nominee for governor in 1905 (Anti-Merger)
- John W. Brown (Socialist)
- Thomas F. Brennan (Socialist Labor)
- Hervey S. Cowell (Prohibition)
- Curtis Guild Jr., incumbent governor (Republican)
- Thomas Hisgen, petroleum businessman (Independence)
- Henry Melville Whitney, industrialist and Democratic nominee for lt. governor in 1905 (Democratic-Independent) (Note: In addition to the Democratic nomination, Whitney also ran on the Democratic Citizens and Independent Citizens tickets and had independent ballot access.)

=== Campaign ===
The split in the Democratic Party assured Guild of re-election in the normally Republican state. Guild ran a quiet, positive campaign emphasizing his record in office, largely ignoring his three main opponents. He characterized his party's record as: "a larger amount of progress legislation, a larger amount of radical reorganization of state institutions, and for a larger amount of new appointments than has ever occurred before in any similar period in the whole history of the commonwealth."

=== Results ===
1907 Massachusetts gubernatorial election
Party	Candidate	Votes	%	±%
Republican	Curtis Guild Jr. (incumbent)	188,068	50.33%	▼1.63
Democratic	Henry Melville Whitney	70,842	18.96%	▼8.07
Dem. Citizens	Henry Melville Whitney	6,691	1.79%	N/A
Ind. Citizens	Henry Melville Whitney	5,154	1.38%	N/A
Independent	Henry Melville Whitney	1,692	0.45%	N/A
Total	Henry Melville Whitney	168,162	22.58%	N/A
Independence	Thomas Hisgen	75,499	20.20%	▲11.83
Anti-Merger	Charles W. Bartlett	11,194	3.00%	N/A
Socialist	John W. Brown	7,621	2.04%	▲0.19
Prohibition	Hervey S. Cowell	3,810	1.02%	▼4.97
Socialist Labor	Thomas F. Brennan	2,999	0.58%	▲0.07
Write-in		135	0.05%	▲0.04
Total votes		373,705	100.00%	

== See also ==
- 1907 Massachusetts legislature
