= 1903 Massachusetts gubernatorial election =

- November 3, 1903
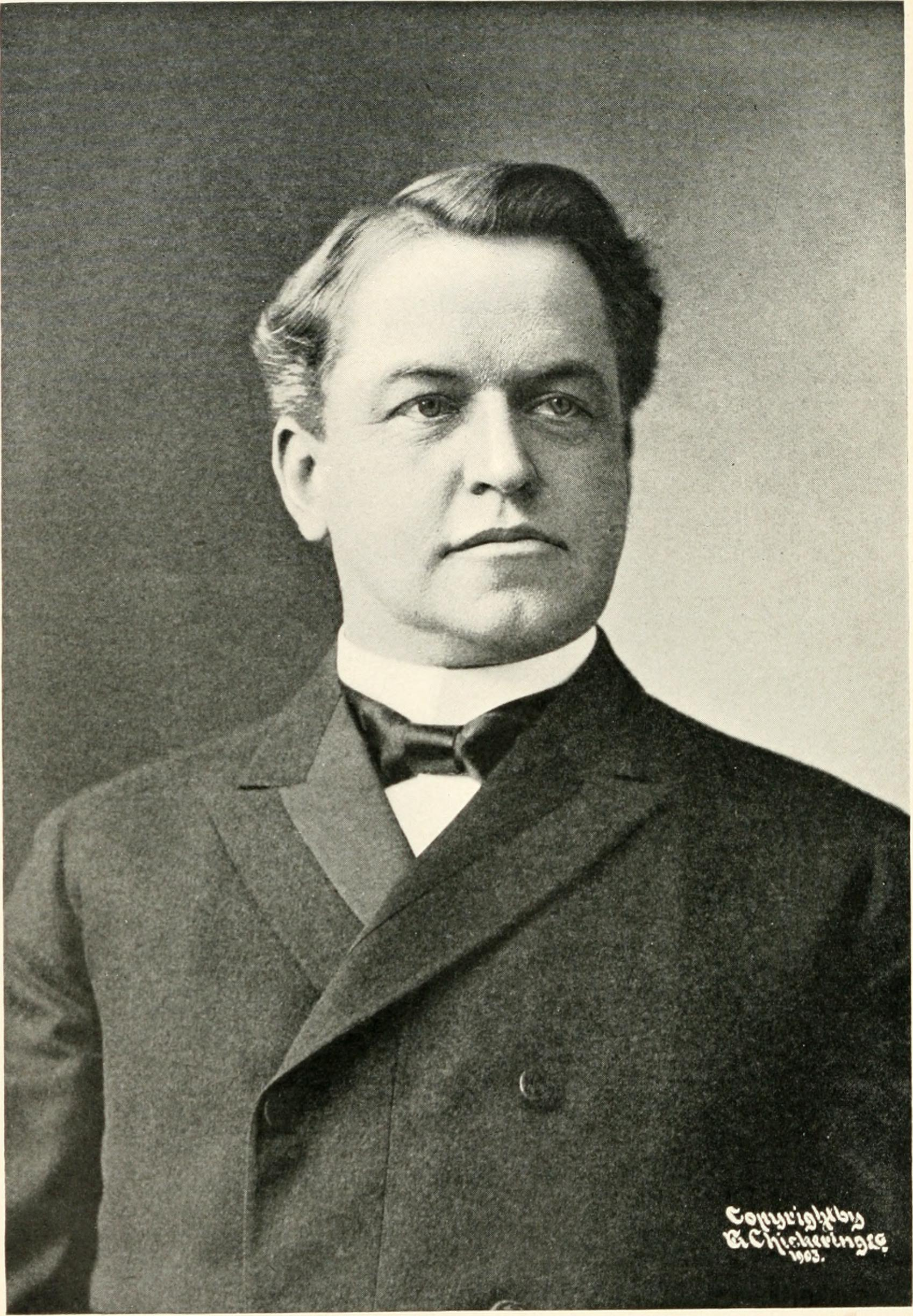

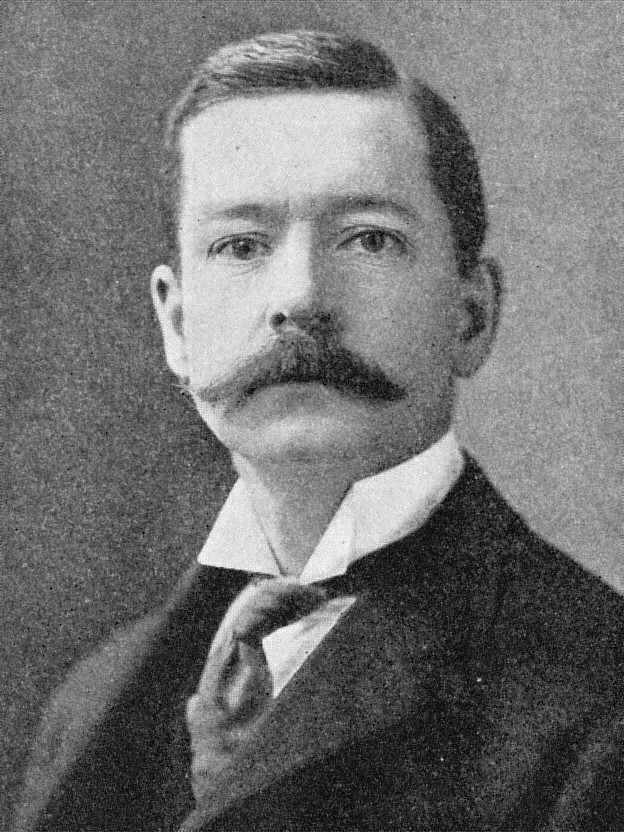

Nominee	John L. Bates	William A. Gaston	John C. Chase
Party	Republican	Democratic	Socialist
Popular vote	199,684	163,700	25,251
Percentage	50.36%	41.29%	6.37%
- Bates: 40-50% 50–60% 60–70% 70–80% 80–90% >90% Gaston: 40-50% 50–60% 60–70% 70–80% Tie: 50%
Governor before election
John L. Bates
Republican
Elected Governor
John L. Bates
Republican

The 1903 Massachusetts gubernatorial election was held on November 3, 1903. Incumbent Republican Governor John L. Bates was re-elected to a second term, defeating Democratic nominee William A. Gaston and Socialist John C. Chase in a rematch of the 1902 election.

== General election ==
=== Candidates ===
- John L. Bates, incumbent governor since January 1903 (Republican)
- Thomas F. Brennan (Socialist Labor)
- John C. Chase, former mayor of Haverhill and nominee for governor in 1902 (Socialist)
- William A. Gaston, banker, son of former governor William Gaston and nominee for governor in 1902 (Democratic)
- Oliver W. Cobb (Prohibition)

=== Results ===
1903 Massachusetts gubernatorial election
Party	Candidate	Votes	%	±%
Republican	John L. Bates (incumbent)	196,276	50.36%	▲1.13
Democratic	William A. Gaston	163,700	41.29%	▲1.37
Socialist	John C. Chase	25,251	6.37%	▼2.07
Socialist Labor	Thomas F. Brennan	4,561	1.15%	▼0.38
Prohibition	Oliver W. Cobb	3,278	0.83%	▼0.06
Write-in	All others	5	0.00%	Steady
Total votes		396,479	100.00%	

== See also ==
- 1903 Massachusetts legislature

== Bibliography ==
- Office of the Secretary of the Commonwealth (1910). Election Statistics, 1903. Boston, MA: Wright & Potter Printing Co., State Printers.
