= Camp Curtis Guild =

Massachusetts Army National Guard camp

- Part of Massachusetts Army National Guard
- Reading, Lynnfield, and Wakefield, Massachusetts
- Headquarters and Tent Area at Camp Curtis Guild, Boston Port of Embarkation. Note Transportation Corps emblem on building.

Site information
- Type: National Guard Training Camp
- Owner: Massachusetts Army National Guard
- Controlled by: Massachusetts Army National Guard
- Open to the public: Prior Permission needed

Location
- Coordinates: 42.531°N 71.076°W

Site history
- Built: 1916
- Built by: Massachusetts Army National Guard
- In use: 1916-Present
- Battles/wars: World War I, World War II, Cold War

Garrison information
- Occupants: Massachusetts Army National Guard

Camp Curtis Guild is a Massachusetts Army National Guard camp located in the towns of Reading, Lynnfield, and Wakefield, Massachusetts. It is named after former Massachusetts governor Curtis Guild, Jr.

During World War II the camp was one of the embarkation camps under the command of the Boston Port of Embarkation.

== History ==
During World War I, the site was leased from the Bay State Rifle Association by the United States Navy. The area then became known as Camp Plunkett and wooden barracks and mess halls were erected on the site. After the war, the land was returned to the association.

In 1926, the land was purchased by the Commonwealth of Massachusetts at a cost of $65 million, (approximately equivalent to $1,074,454,887 in 2022 dollars). On March 1 of that year, Governor Alvin T. Fuller named the camp in honor of the former governor Curtis Guild, Jr. “in consideration of [his] public service and intimate connection with the military forces of the state and nation.”

During the time period between 1933 and 1936, a Works Progress Administration camp was operated by the state on the site. Several wood-frame buildings were also erected on the site during this time.

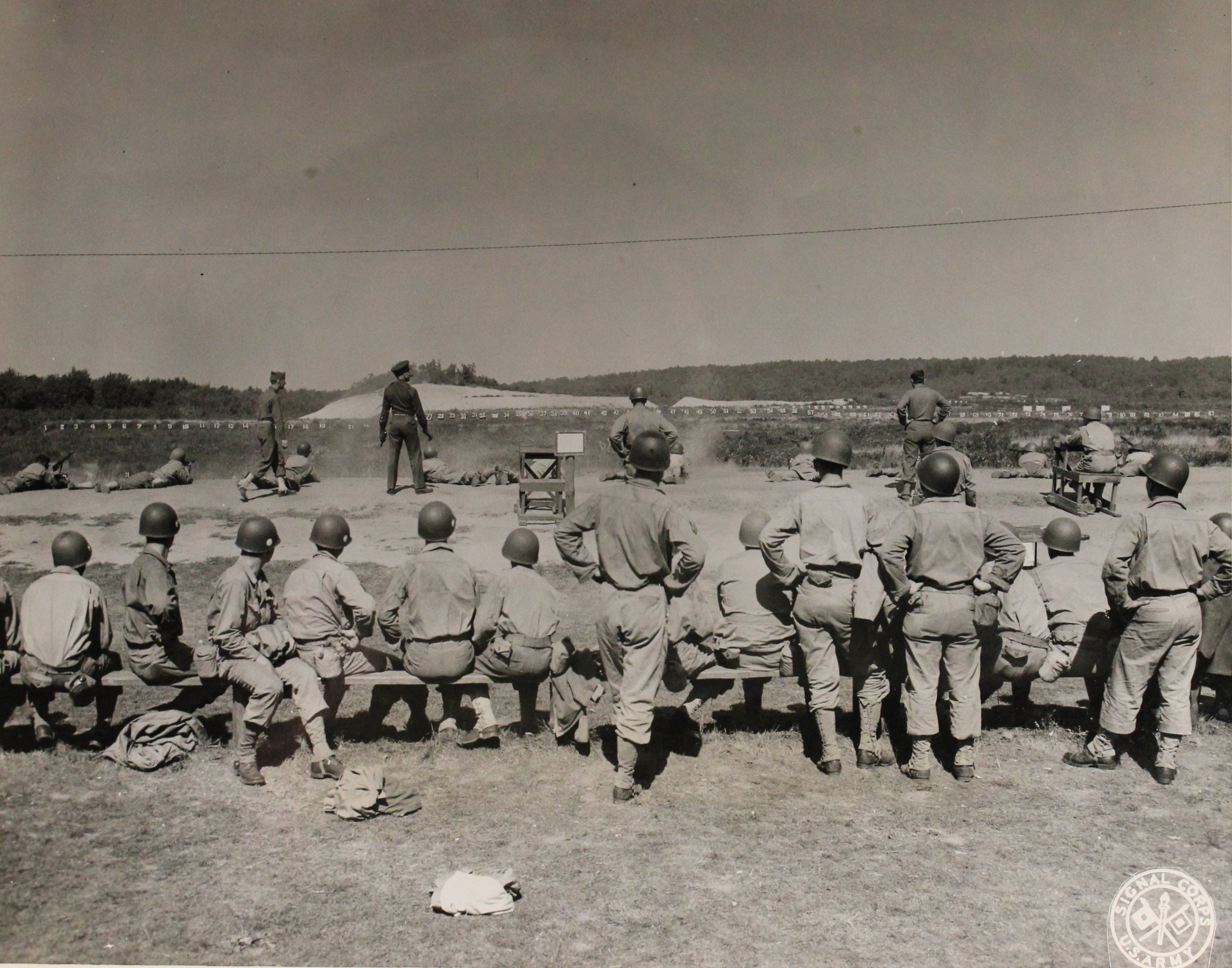
Firing for record on Camp Curtis Guild rifle range, Boston Port of Embarkation.

During World War II, the camp was operated as a staging area by the First Service Command under the command of and for the Boston Port of Embarkation. The camp was also utilized by the United States Coast Guard, as well for training.

In 1992, the army conducted a Lyme Disease Risk Assessment and noted that the disease was present in ticks at the facility, as well as the presence of human Lyme disease cases in the surrounding area.

In 1968 the site was selected to host the Boston-area Sentinel ABM, but fierce public opposition led to the project being put on hold, and then canceled in favor of the Safeguard Program, which was located far from urban areas.

In November 1976, the rock band KISS rented out an area of the facility in Reading to rehearse for their upcoming "Winter Tour 76/77" for the album Rock and Roll Over. While there, the band filmed three music videos for the Don Kirshner Rock Concert television show. The videos would air in May 1977.

In 1998, the outdoor firing facility was closed after a stray bullet nearly struck a Lynnfield mother and her toddler. Between 1967 and 1998, nineteen stray bullets were found in the abutting neighborhood. Prior to the closing of the range, police departments from the surrounding area used the outdoor range for training. The incident resulted in the building of an indoor range at the facility.

== Training Facilities ==
The facility contains fifteen training areas, two bivouac sites for company-sized elements, a land navigation site, a recovery training site, an engineer dig training site, a helipad, and an Engagement Skills Trainer. Ten miles of unmaintained roads are also present on the site to help with training for wheeled and tracked vehicles.

== Tenants ==
A list of tenants that operate at the facility:

- 151st Regional Support Group
- Field Maintenance Facility #4
- 272nd Chemical Company
- 972nd Military Police Company
- 188th Engineer Detachment
- Camp Curtis Guild Composite Squadron MA-072 Civil Air Patrol
- MA NG Family Program

== See also ==
- Camp Guild - WWI training camp in Boxford named for the same person
- List of military installations in Massachusetts
