= Warry Charles =

Chinese American businessman (1857–1915)

Warry S. Charles (1857 – 1915) was a Chinese American businessman and Hip Sing Association leader who was tried and convicted for organizing a hit during the Tong Wars in Boston's Chinatown.

== Biography ==
Charles was born in 1857 in China. He moved to the United States when he was 11 years old and worked for relatives in San Francisco and New Orleans. When he was 16 he moved to Omaha where he attended a business college. On March 14, 1876, he married Mary Whiting in Omaha. He was the first Chinese immigrant to marry a white woman in Nebraska Territory. They had two sons, one of whom, Warren Charles, became the second Chinese-American officer in the New York Police Department. Charles finished his education at the University of Nebraska.

In New York, Charles worked as an interpreter and city inspector. In 1886, Charles was brought in by the Boston Police Department to work as an interpreter during their investigation of the “Wash-House Murder”. On October 9, 1891, he was assaulted while trying to aid a fellow Hip Sing member who was being attacked by two On Leong tong members. Charles was assaulted again later that week when he walked past the On Leong headquarters. On July 19, 1895, Charles complained to New York City police commissioner Theodore Roosevelt that the local police precinct was not cracking down on the On Leong gambling rings in Chinatown because they were in the pay of the On Leong. Charles said he could take down the rings if he was provided with two detectives to assist him. He threatened Roosevelt that if he did not help, Charles would release information that would be embarrassing to the NYPD. Roosevelt did not take Charles up on his offer. He left New York City for Boston for his own safety.

In Boston, Charles worked as a court interpreter and started a successful laundry business. In 1903 he helped form a branch of the Hip Sing tong in Boston and became its leader. On August 7, 1907, a group of highbinders carried out an attack in Chinatown that left four dead and six wounded. The police believed that Charles, as leader of the Hip Sing, orchestrated the attack as in retaliation for a 1903 murder of one of their members. In 1908, Charles and eight other Hip Sing members were found guilty of the murders. Four of the men's convictions were overturned due to insufficient evidence, but Charles' was upheld. His attorneys, Charles W. Bartlett and Harvey H. Pratt, appealed the case to the Massachusetts Supreme Judicial Court on the grounds that a witness should have been allowed to testify that a police officer and a Chinese interpreter had conspired to bribe prosecution witnesses. The Court ruled against the defendants and Charles and four of his co-defendants were sentenced to death. Three of the men asked that Bartlett and Pratt not petition for commutation, as they preferred death to life in prison and they were executed on October 11, 1909. Charles and the other convicted man, Joe Guey, chose to petition for commutation. Sixteen days before their scheduled executions, Governor Eben Sumner Draper announced that he had accepted the Massachusetts Governor's Council's recommendation to commute Charles and Guey's death sentences to life imprisonment.

On August 7, 1915, Charles complained of chest pains. He was seen by Dr. Daniel J. Hurley and moved to the prison hospital the next day. On August 9, 1915, Charles died in the Charlestown State Prison. His cause of death was "rheumatism of the heart".
