= John L. Bates =

American politician (1859–1946)

John Lewis Bates
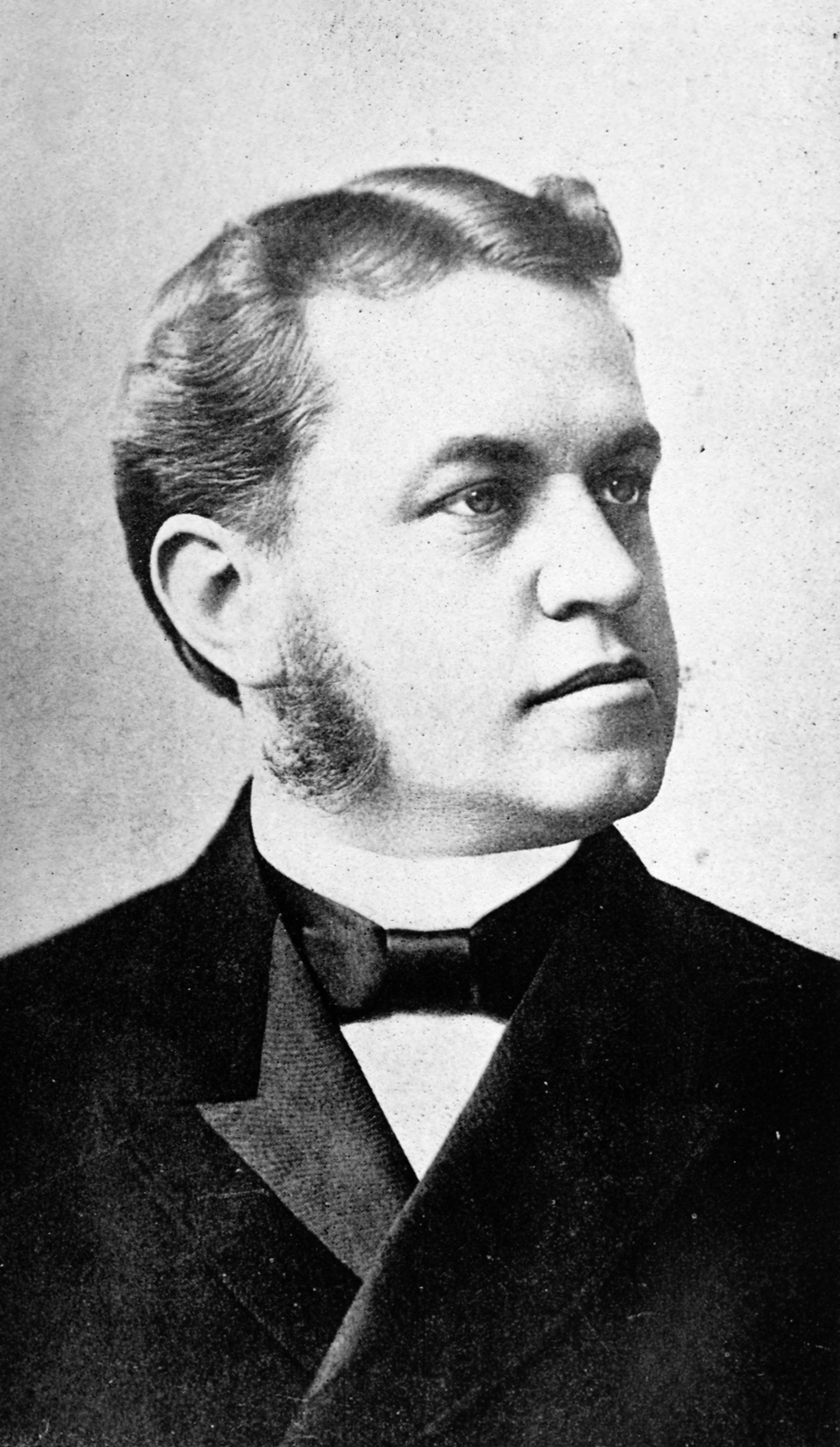

41st Governor of Massachusetts
- In office January 8, 1903 – January 5, 1905
- Lieutenant: Curtis Guild Jr.
- Preceded by: Winthrop M. Crane
- Succeeded by: William Lewis Douglas

38th Lieutenant Governor of Massachusetts
- In office January 4, 1900 – January 8, 1903
- Governor: Winthrop M. Crane
- Preceded by: Winthrop M. Crane
- Succeeded by: Curtis Guild Jr.

Member of the Massachusetts House of Representatives
- In office 1894-1899

Personal details
- Born: September 18, 1859 Easton, Massachusetts, U.S.
- Died: June 8, 1946 (aged 86) Boston, Massachusetts, U.S.
- Party: Republican
- Spouse: Clara Elizabeth Smith
- Profession: Lawyer

John Lewis Bates (September 18, 1859 – June 8, 1946) was an American lawyer and Republican politician from Massachusetts.

Bates worked to promote East Boston, securing legislative approval of the first tunnel under Boston Harbor, joining the neighborhood to the rest of the city. From 1903 to 1905, he served as the 41st governor of Massachusetts, upsetting the Republican establishment with his organizing tactics and alienating his own supporters with some of his conservative executive actions and proposals.

Later in life, he served as chair of the Massachusetts Constitutional Convention of 1917–1918.

== Early life and education ==
John Bates was born in North Easton, Massachusetts to Rev. Lewis Benton Bates, an itinerant Methodist minister, and Louisa D. (Field) Bates. He attended public school in New Bedford, Chelsea, Taunton, and eventually the Boston Latin School.

He earned an A.B. from the Methodist-affiliated Boston University in 1882 and a J.D. in 1885. Over the next decade Bates practiced law in Boston, residing in its East Boston neighborhood.

== Early political career ==
=== Boston Common Council ===
Bates, a Republican, first served on Boston's Common Council representing. During this period, Bates built a ward-based political machine largely independent of the existing party infrastructure.

Beginning in 1891, Bates began promoting connections between East Boston and the rest of the city (separated by the inner Boston Harbor). Early proposals for a bridge went nowhere, and Bates instead began working on a tunnel proposal. The proposal met opposition from Boston's leadership over its construction costs. Bates convinced Mayor Josiah Quincy to accept a toll of one cent per rider, securing agreement for its construction.

=== Speaker of the Massachusetts House ===
Bates won election to represent East Boston in the Massachusetts House of Representatives in 1893 and served until 1899.

From 1897 to 1899, Bates was Speaker of the House. He was elected Speaker with the support of his independent machine, without party support.

=== Lieutenant governor ===
In 1899, Bates again bucked the Republican party establishment by defeating the expected nominee, Curtis Guild Jr., for the party nomination for Lieutenant Governor of Massachusetts. Bates was not highly thought of by the more Brahmin elements of the party establishment, but it ultimately supported his runs for lieutenant governor and governor. Senator Henry Cabot Lodge, who supported Bates in 1902, believed that some of the opposition to Bates was based "on the profound idea of a certain element... 'that he was not our kind'."

== Governor of Massachusetts ==
In 1902, Bates was elected the 41st governor, despite a significant crossover of Republicans to his Democratic opponent, William A. Gaston.

During his first term, Bates stepped up enforcement of strict liquor control laws. He also generated controversy by disregarding supporters' requests and catering to the more exclusive elements of the party establishment. However, these elements only supported Bates out of party duty and were also upset by the appointment of one of his East Boston cronies as Boston police commissioner.

Despite losing support from factions in his own party, Bates won reelection in 1903. His second term deepened these divisions. He proposed further amendments to Sunday entertainment laws and angered agricultural interests with a proposal for reorganizing grading and inspection of farms. He vetoed a Republican bill limiting the working hours of women and children, earning him the opposition of labor interests. He also angered veterans groups by vetoing a bill granting a gratuity to the state's surviving American Civil War veterans, which the legislature successfully overrode.

In 1904, the long-planned tunnel to East Harbor was opened. It now carries the MBTA Blue Line.

In the 1904 election, Democrats nominated Brockton businessman William L. Douglas, who had nationwide name and facial recognition because his image was stamped on the shoes he sold. Douglas, who was on good terms with labor interests, financed the Democratic campaign and won a landslide victory over Bates.

== Later career ==
Bates then retired to his private law practice in Boston, largely withdrawing from political life.

He was offered the possibility of standing for Vice President of the United States in 1912, but refused.

From 1917 to 1919, he presided over the Massachusetts Constitutional Convention, which enacted a number of changes to the state constitution. During World War II, he served on the state's Public Safety Commission.

== Personal life ==
Bates married Clara Elizabeth Smith on July 12, 1887.

Bates was an active member of the Freemasons and the International Order of Odd Fellows. He was awarded an honorary law degree by Wesleyan University in 1903.

He retired from his law practice in 1931, and died at his home in Allston in 1946. He was interred at Woodlawn Cemetery in Everett.

== See also ==
- 119th Massachusetts General Court (1898)
- List of speakers of the Massachusetts House of Representatives

== Sources ==
- Abrams, Richard (1964). Conservatism in a Progressive Era: Massachusetts Politics 1900-1912. Cambridge, MA: Harvard University Press.

Party political offices
| Preceded by Winthrop M. Crane | Republican nominee for Governor of Massachusetts; 1902, 1903, 1904 | Succeeded by Curtis Guild Jr. |
Massachusetts House of Representatives
| Preceded by George von Lengerke Meyer | Speaker of the Massachusetts House of Representatives; 1897 — 1899 | Succeeded by James J. Myers |
Political offices
| Preceded by Winthrop M. Crane | Lieutenant Governor of Massachusetts; 1900–1903 | Succeeded by Curtis Guild Jr. |
| Preceded by Winthrop M. Crane | Governor of Massachusetts; 1903–1905 | Succeeded by William L. Douglas |
