= Thomas L. Hisgen =

American politician

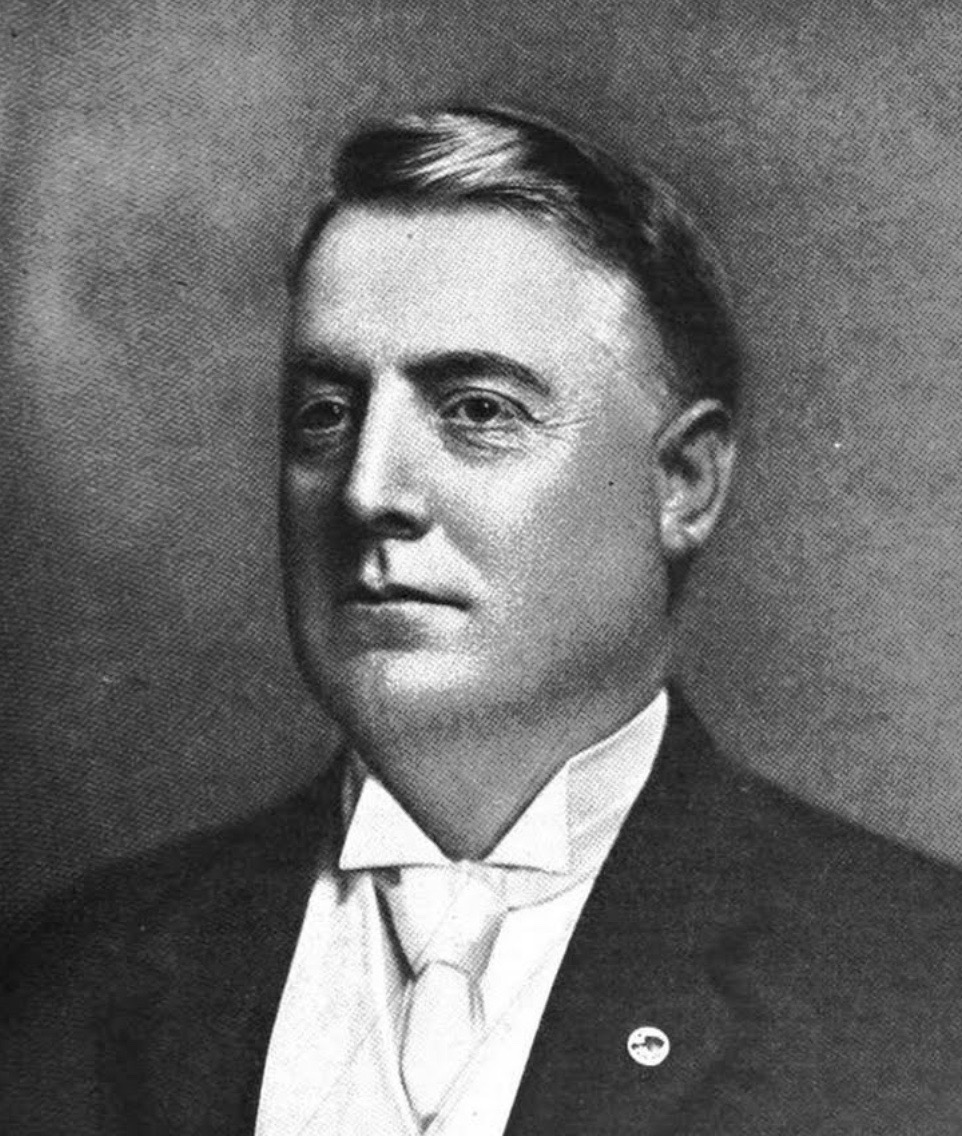
Thomas L. Hisgen

Thomas L. Hisgen (L) with William Randolph Hearst, millionaire newspaper publisher who was the financial angel behind the 1908 launch of the Independence Party.

Thomas Louis Hisgen (November 26, 1858 – August 27, 1925) was an American petroleum producer and politician.

He refused to sell his firm to the Standard Oil Trust and was chosen by the Massachusetts Independence League as its candidate for Governor of Massachusetts in 1907. After a strong third-place performance, Hisgen became the logical choice as presidential nominee of the national Independence Party during the 1908 United States presidential election. Although he toured the country on the campaign trail, Hisgen's poorer-than-expected showing at the polls in November 1908 spelled the end for the Independence Party (82,537 = 0.55% of the vote), many of whose members rejoined the Democrats. Hisgen subsequently remained in the public eye as a periodic commentator on events in the petroleum industry.

== Biography ==
He was born November 26, 1858, in Petersburg, Indiana, to William Hisgen and Margaret Catherine McNally. His father was a German immigrant who had first lived in Albany, New York, before coming west to Indiana in 1857. His mother was from Canada.

He was educated in a small country school and was forced by economic circumstances to go to work at an early age to help provide financial support for his parents and siblings. Most of his education Hisgen obtained on his own through a steady reading of books.

In 1875, when Hisgen was 16, he and his family returned from Indiana to New York, where he and two brothers worked as clerks in a clothing store. His father, who had some basic knowledge of chemistry, had long worked at creating a new and improved axle grease compound which could be patented and marketed. This invention by his father became the basis of a family industry when Thomas Hisgen — together with three of his brothers — established the Four Brothers Axle Grease Company in Albany in 1888.

He died on August 27, 1925, in Miami, Florida.

== Footnotes ==
Party political offices
| Preceded by John B. Moran | Independence League nominee for Governor of Massachusetts; 1907 | Succeeded by William N. Osgood |
