= William A. Gaston =

American lawyer and politician (1859–1927)

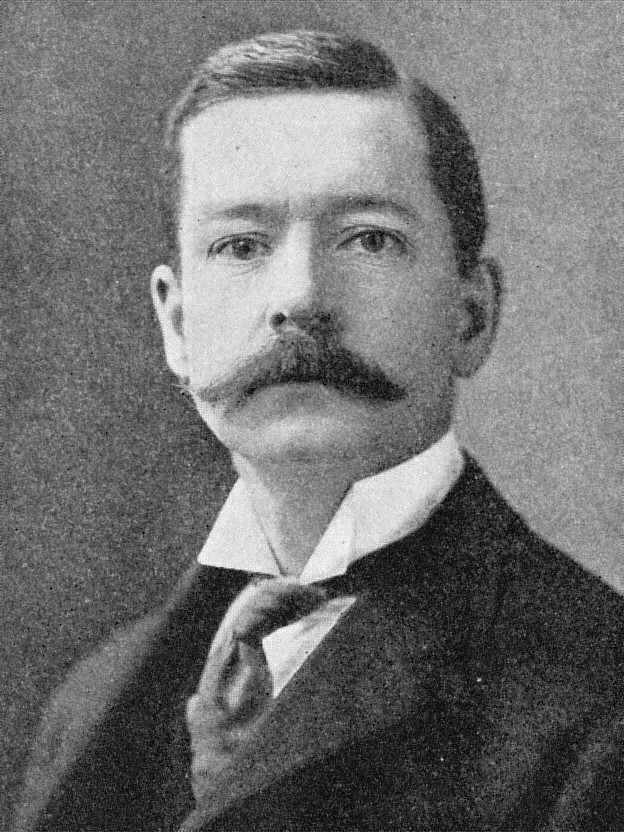
- Gaston c. 1902
- Born: May 1, 1859; Roxbury, Massachusetts, U.S.
- Died: July 17, 1927 (aged 68); Barre, Massachusetts, U.S.
- Occupations: Lawyer, banker, politician
- Spouse: Mary Davidson Lockwood (m. 1892)

William Alexander Gaston (May 1, 1859 – July 17, 1927) was an American lawyer, banker, and politician who was the Democratic Party nominee for Governor of Massachusetts in 1902, 1903, and 1926 and the United States Senate in 1905 and 1922. Outside of politics, Gaston served as president of the Boston Elevated Railway and National Shawmut Bank.

== Early life ==
Gaston was born on May 1, 1859, in Roxbury, Massachusetts, to William and Louisa Augusta (Beecher) Gaston. His father was Governor of Massachusetts from 1875 to 1876. Gaston graduated from Roxbury Latin School in 1876.

Gaston graduated from Harvard College in 1880. While at Harvard, he was a member of Delta Kappa Epsilon (aka The Dickey Club). In 1879 he defeated Ramon Guiteras to win the Harvard's middleweight boxing championship. One of Gaston's seconds in the fight was Theodore Roosevelt. Gaston went on to graduate from Harvard Law School and was admitted to the bar in 1883.

== Career ==
=== Law ===
After passing the bar, Gaston joined his father's law firm, Gaston and Whitney. He eventually became a partner in the firm and in 1890 the firm's name changed to William Gaston and William A. Gaston. Frederick E. Snow was admitted as a partner in 1892 and the firm became Gaston and Snow. Richard M. Saltonstall joined in 1899 and the firm grew to become the largest in Boston. Gaston became a trustee of 15 estates in Boston and was the largest trustees in the city's who did not pursue trusteeship as a career.

=== Business ===
In 1896, Gaston led a group that purchased the Boston Elevated Railway Company. As president of the railway he organized the city's various street railways into a single entity. He raised wages of railway employees and introduced worker's compensation. In 1899, his other business interests required him to step down in favor of William Bancroft. He remained with the company as chairman of the board until 1901.

Gaston was a founding director of the National Shawmut Bank. On May 2, 1907, Gaston was elected president of the bank, which by then was the largest in New England. He successfully led the bank through the Panic of 1907. He remained president until 1917 and then served as chairman of the board until 1923.

=== Politics ===
Gaston's political career began as a member of the staff of Governor William Russell. From 1891 to 1893 he was the assistant adjutant general of Massachusetts. In 1901, Gaston was mentioned by Democratic party chairman William S. McNary as a possible candidate for Governor of Massachusetts. He withdrew from the race in favor of uniting the party behind Josiah Quincy. Quincy was defeated by Republican Winthrop M. Crane and chose not to run in 1902, which made Gaston and Charles Sumner Hamlin the frontrunners for the nomination. Gaston defeated Hamlin at the state convention 1004 votes to 232. Gaston lost the election to Republican John L. Bates 49 to 40 percent. Gaston was again the Democratic nominee for Governor in 1903, losing to Bates a second time 50 to 41 percent.

Gaston was elected as an at-large delegate to the 1904 Democratic National Convention as part of a slate of candidates that supported Richard Olney. Later that year he was elected to Massachusetts' seat on the Democratic National Committee. Olney refused to run for president and at the 1904 convention, Gaston and the Massachusetts delegation backed Alton B. Parker and a platform that supported the gold standard. He also considered running for Governor in 1904, but in September announced that he would not run. On October 17, 1905, Gaston announced that he would retire from politics following that year's election.

Gaston returned to politics in 1910 as a candidate for the United States Senate. He entered the race on November 18, but dropped out on December 21 as he believed Democratic Governor-elect Eugene Foss's campaign to elect a progressive Republican to the seat had spoiled the Democrats' chance of electing one of their own. During the 1912 United States Presidential Election, Gaston helped raise money for Woodrow Wilson's campaign. Following Wilson's election, Gaston's friends pushed for his appointment as United States Secretary of the Navy, a position that traditionally went to a man from New England. The position instead went to someone outside of New England - Josephus Daniels. Following the passage of Federal Reserve Act, Gaston was mentioned as a possible member of the Federal Reserve Board of Governors.

On July 31, 1918, Gaston announced his candidacy for the Democratic nomination for Governor. Three days later Frederick Mansfield dropped out of the race in favor of Gaston. However, Gaston was defeated in the primary election by Richard H. Long 39 to 34 percent (former Lieutenant Governor Edward P. Barry received the remaining 27 percent). In 1920, nomination papers were circulated on Gaston's behalf, however on July 28, Gaston decided not to enter the Governor's race, as he did not believe he had the full support of the party.

On April 8, 1922, Gaston announced that he was running in that year's election United States Senate seat held by Republican Henry Cabot Lodge. He won the four candidate Democratic primary with 51 percent of the vote. He narrowly lost the general election to Lodge by less than 1 percent (414,130 to 406,776).

Before the 1924 Democratic National Convention, the Massachusetts delegation discussed nominating Gaston for vice president in the event the convention became deadlocked and a "dark horse" candidate won the presidential nomination. The nomination was indeed won by a dark horse (John W. Davis) and Gaston was nominated for vice president by Winfield Tucker of Massachusetts. Charles W. Bryan won the vice presidential nomination on the first ballot.

In 1926, Gaston was persuaded to once again serve as the Democrats' candidate for Governor. He ran unopposed in the primary after the only other candidate who was considering a gubernatorial run, Joseph B. Ely, was instead convinced to run for Lieutenant Governor. Gaston lost to Republican incumbent Alvan T. Fuller 59 to 40 percent.

== Personal life ==
On April 9, 1892, he married Mary Davidson Lockwood. They had four children. Gaston resided in Boston, had a summer home on the Fox Islands in North Haven, and owned a 1,500 acre farm in Barre, Massachusetts, where he kept his champion cows. He died on July 17, 1927, at his farm in Barre.

Business positions
Preceded by Thomas W. Hyde	President of the Boston Elevated Railway; 1896–1899	Succeeded by William Bancroft
Preceded by James P. Stearns	President of National Shawmut Bank; 1907–1917	Succeeded by Alfred L. Aiken
Party political offices
Preceded by Josiah Quincy	Democratic nominee for Governor of Massachusetts; 1902, 1903	Succeeded by William Lewis Douglas
Preceded by John F. Fitzgerald	Democratic nominee for U.S. Senator from Massachusetts (Class 1); 1922	Succeeded by David I. Walsh
Preceded by James Michael Curley	Democratic nominee for Governor of Massachusetts; 1926	Succeeded by Charles H. Cole
Preceded by George F. Williams	Democratic National Committeeman from Massachusetts; 1904–1905	Succeeded by John W. Coughlin
