= Henry M. Pindell =

American politician

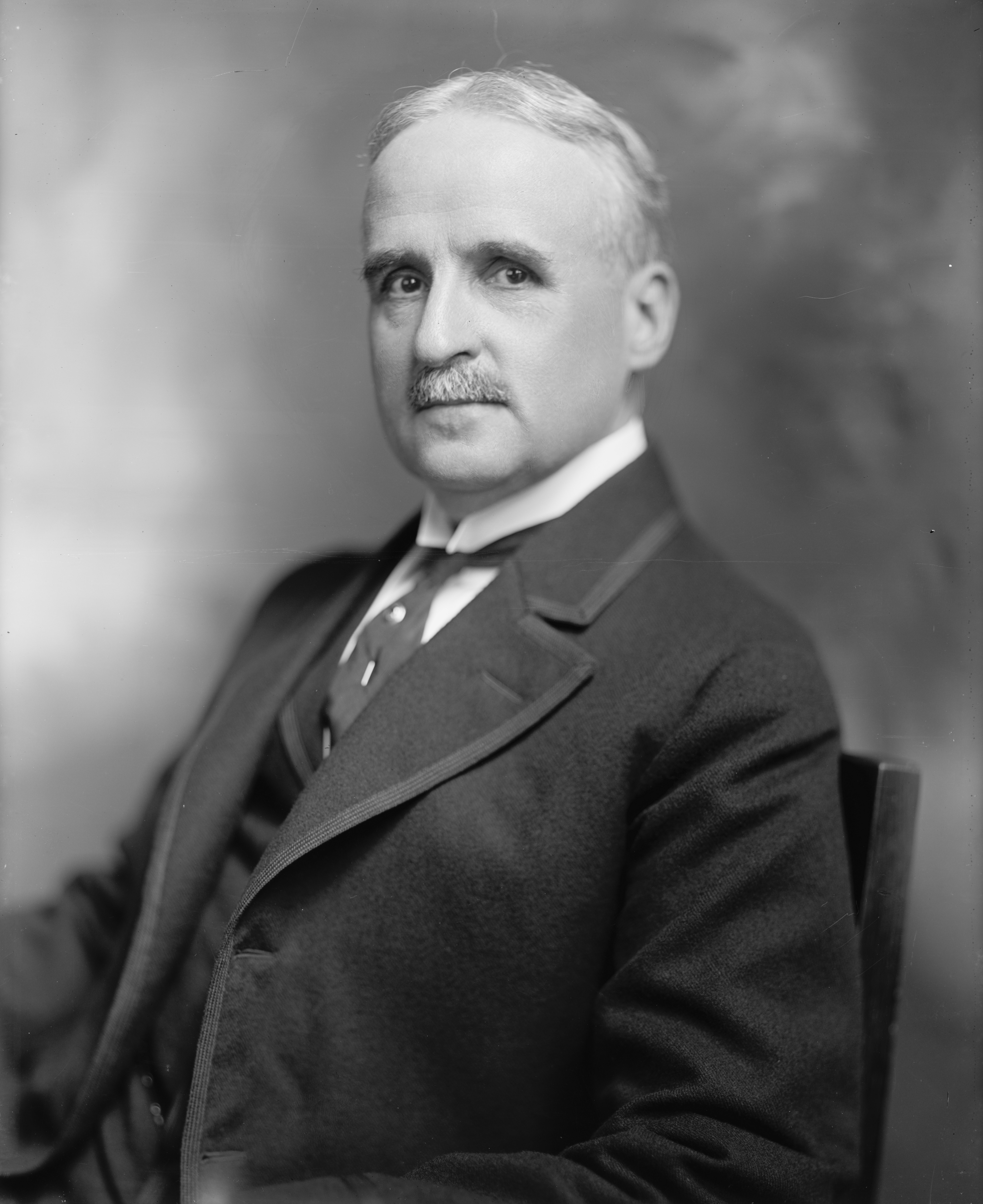

Personal details
- Born: December 23, 1860 St. Joseph, Missouri, U.S.
- Died: August 8, 1924 (aged 63) Leelanau County, Michigan, U.S.
- Party: Democratic
- Profession: Newspaper owner

Henry Means Pindell (December 23, 1860 – August 8, 1924) was an American journalist, businessman and political figure from Illinois.

He was nominated by President of the United States Woodrow Wilson to serve as United States Ambassador to Russia, and confirmed by the United States Senate. Pindell withdrew himself from consideration after alleged private correspondence between Pindell and U.S. Senator J. Hamilton Lewis was leaked to the press.

== Business and newspaper activities ==
Pindell graduated from DePaul University in 1884. After graduation from college, Pindell began working as the city editor of the Wabash Times. Next, he joined the editorial staff of the Chicago Tribune. He later worked as the city editor of the Illinois State Register in Springfield, Illinois.

After moving to Peoria, Illinois in 1889, Pindell founded the Peoria Herald, now known as the Journal Star. For a time, he served on the board of the Associated Press.

== Political career ==
While in Springfield, Pindell was elected City treasurer. He served in the position from 1887 until 1889.

Through his role as the owner of a variety of newspapers, Pindell became highly influential politically. In 1912, he became a state leader of Woodrow Wilson's Presidential Campaign. Pindell became a close friend and confidante of Wilson. Pindell was a delegate to the Democratic National Convention in 1908 and 1912.
