= William Lewis Douglas =

American politician (1845–1924)

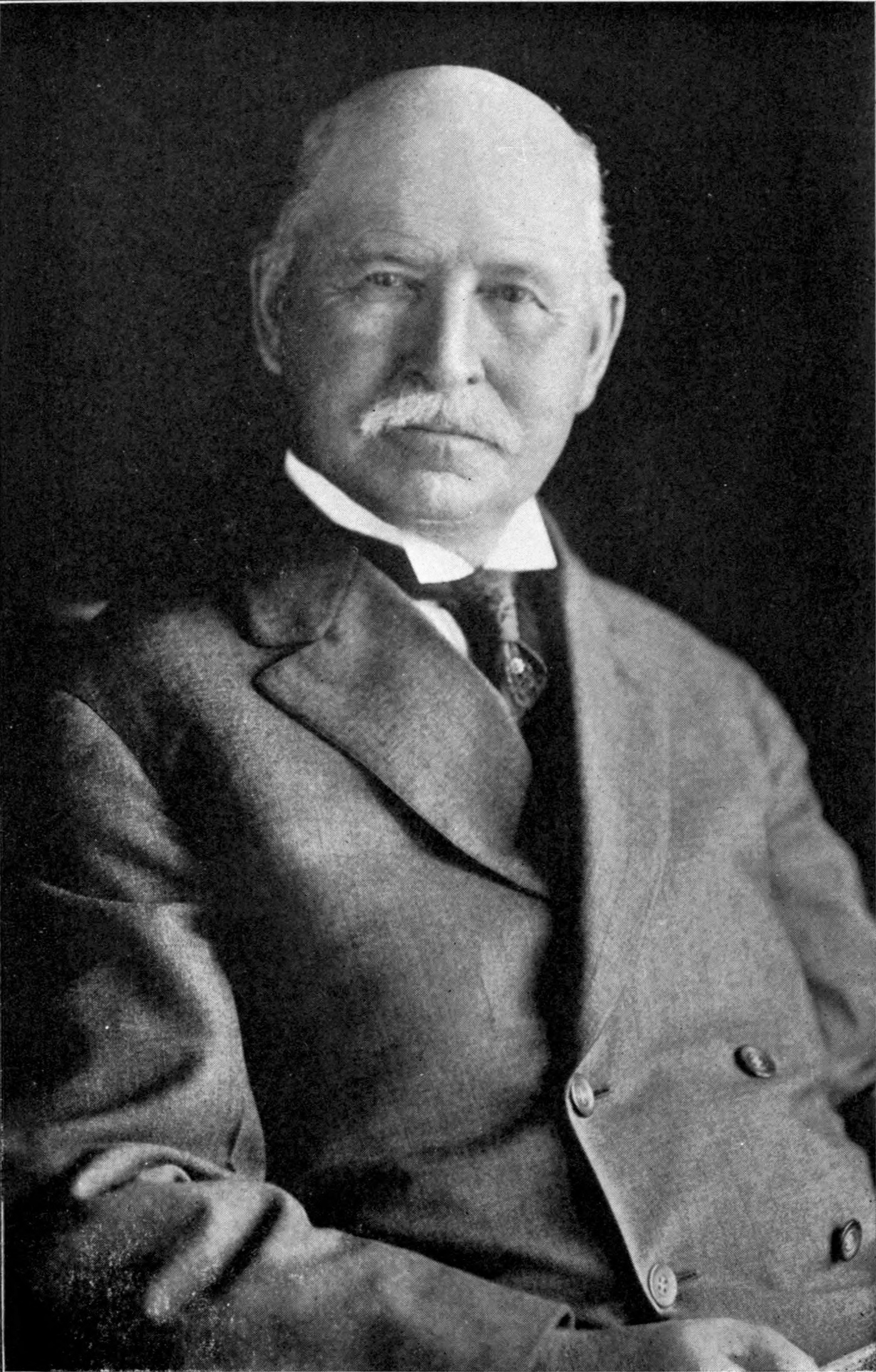

42nd Governor of Massachusetts
- In office January 5, 1905 – January 4, 1906
- Lieutenant: Curtis Guild Jr.
- Preceded by: John L. Bates
- Succeeded by: Curtis Guild Jr.

Mayor of Brockton, Massachusetts
- In office 1890–1891
- Preceded by: Albert R. Wade
- Succeeded by: Ziba Cary Keith

Member of the Massachusetts Senate from the 2nd Plymouth district
- In office January 6, 1886 – January 5, 1887
- Preceded by: Horace Reed
- Succeeded by: Ziba Cary Keith

Member of the Massachusetts House of Representatives from Brockton
- In office January 3, 1883 – January 6, 1885
- Preceded by: Davis S. Packard
- Succeeded by: William F. Whipple

Personal details
- Born: August 22, 1845 Plymouth, Massachusetts, U.S.
- Died: September 17, 1924 (aged 79) Boston, Massachusetts, U.S.
- Party: Democratic

William Lewis Douglas (August 22, 1845 – September 17, 1924) was an American businessman and politician from Massachusetts. He served as the 42nd governor of Massachusetts from 1905 until 1906. He also founded and oversaw the growth of the W. L. Douglas Shoe Company, a highly successful Brockton, Massachusetts, business that became one of the world's largest shoe manufacturers. He also opened the first nationwide chain of shoe stores devoted to selling the company's products.

Douglas received a minimal education and was apprenticed into the shoe trade. In 1876, he established his business, which grew rapidly over the next twenty years. He entered politics as a supporter of labor and an opponent of socialism, and funded his 1904 campaign for governor. In addition to labor causes, he supported reciprocity and tariff reductions in trade with Canada. He refused to run for reelection, and returned to his business.

== Early years ==
William Lewis Douglas was born on August 22, 1845, in Plymouth, Massachusetts, to William and Mary (Vaughan) Douglas. His father died when he was five. He received only intermittent schooling, and began working for his uncle in his shoemaking business at the age of seven. He eventually became an apprentice, working for his uncle until a decline in business in 1859 forced him to take textile factory work. The advent of the American Civil War revived the demand for boots, and Douglas briefly returned to the shoemaking business before enlisting in the Union Army. He served for one year, was wounded, and received his discharge in 1865.

After the war Douglas went west to the Colorado Territory. There he again took up shoemaking, but also spent time working as partner in a shoe store he established in Golden with Alfred Studley. The store advertised in the Golden Transcript with the slogan "INDIANS! If you wish to run away from the Indians don't go barefoot, but buy a pair of Boots or Shoes Of Studley & Douglas." Meeting success, from then onward Douglas believed in the power of advertising. In 1868 he sold his share in the store for $400 and returned to Massachusetts. There he worked for eight years as a factory supervisor in a Brockton shoe factory.

== W. L. Douglas Shoe Company ==
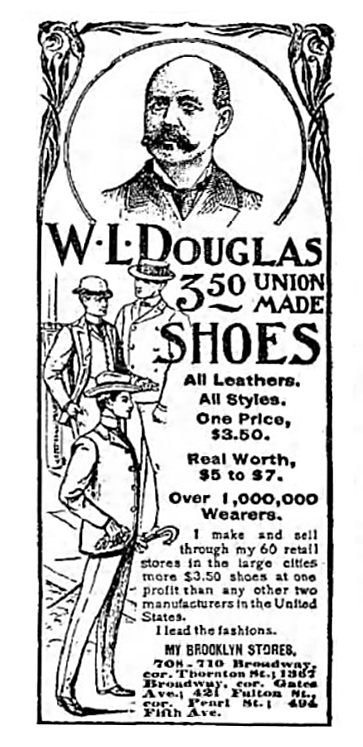
Newspaper advertisement in New York City, 1899

In 1876 Douglas borrowed $875 in order to open his own shoe factory. One critical decision he made in establishing the business was that he would sell the shoes he manufactured through his own line of retail outlets, rather than shipping them to other retailers or intermediaries. His business grew rapidly: every few years the factory's output doubled, and by 1892 he was making 3,600 shoes per day. By the early 1900s his factory was the largest shoe manufactory in the world. The retail side of the business also grew: the first store opened in 1894, and by 1900 there were 55 stores nationwide.

Douglas was one of the first shoe manufacturers to widely advertise his products. He stamped the soles of his shoes with his own image (a use he took up after he saw P. T. Barnum's advertising), making it one of the most recognized likenesses of the time. One period writer believed Douglas was likely the most widely recognized figure in the state.

Douglas' workers were members of the Boot and Shoe Workers' Union, which in 1899 sharply raised its dues in order to finance improved benefits and welfare funds. The rank and file were unhappy with this increase, and the dispute threatened the company's ability to label its products with the union stamp. Douglas, who had a reputation as a fair employer, worked with the union to ensure his employees paid the higher dues.

== Political career ==
In 1884 Douglas was elected as a Democrat to the Massachusetts House of Representatives, serving two terms. He then served one term in the state senate in 1886, and was elected mayor of Brockton for a single term in 1890. He was regularly active in the party organization, attending most of the national conventions between 1884 and 1904. He was generally a supporter of improved labor practices, supporting the creation of a labor mediation board, and advocating for the weekly pay of workers.

In 1903, he became prominent in state level politics opposing the rise of the Socialist Party, working to instead draw Socialist sympathizers to the Democratic fold by advocating a strong labor-oriented platform. In 1904 Republican governor John L. Bates vetoed an eight-hour work day bill, galvanizing labor opposition. The Democrats united behind Douglas, highlighting his labor-positive credentials and his fiscal conservatism. He successfully mediated the end of a labor action in Fall River, raising his popularity, and he also supported reciprocity, in particular the reduction of tariffs with Canada that would reduce the price of hides and coal. Douglas defeated Bates by a wide margin with support from the American Federation of Labor, and also drawing significant votes from Socialist circles. The success was a strictly personal victory: there were no other Democratic gains in the state.

Douglas' single term in office did not particularly help the Democratic cause. He bypassed Irish Americans (a significant force in the party) in appointments, leading to accusations of anti-Catholic sentiment. He also undermined his own position by announcing early in 1905 that he would not run for reelection. According to Charles S. Hamlin, Douglas may have been forced into this position by the discovery by Republicans that he had apparently fraudulently acquired an honorable discharge after deserting during the Civil War. The quid pro quo for this information not being revealed was that Douglas not run again. Douglas, despite his labor support, did not have the support of Democrats in the legislature, who helped override several of his vetoes. In the 1905 election, Douglas promoted Hamlin as his successor; the election was won by Republican Curtis Guild Jr.

Douglas returned to his business, retiring in the early 1920s. He was awarded an honorary degree from Tufts University while governor. He also engaged in philanthropic works in Brockton, where he helped found Brockton Hospital and established a charity that funded the treatment of children with eye and ear problems. Douglas moved from Brockton to Brookline in 1918, and died in 1924 after an extended illness. He was buried in Brockton's Melrose Cemetery. He was twice married, with three children.

== Notes ==
Party political offices
Preceded by William A. Gaston	Democratic nominee for Governor of Massachusetts; 1904	Succeeded by Charles W. Bartlett
Political offices
Preceded by John L. Bates	Governor of Massachusetts; 1905–1906	Succeeded by Curtis Guild Jr.
