= John C. Chase =

American activist and politician (1870–1937)

- Chase in 1903

Mayor of Haverhill, Massachusetts
- In office 1898–1900

Personal details
- Born: May 27, 1870 Gilmanton, New Hampshire
- Died: January 27, 1937 (age 66) New Brighton, Pennsylvania
- Party: Populist (1890s); Social Democratic (1894–1901); Socialist (1901–1937)

John Calvin Chase (May 27, 1870 – January 27, 1937) was an American trade union activist and politician. He was elected to two terms as mayor of Haverhill, Massachusetts, on the Social Democratic ticket. He is considered the first socialist to be elected mayor of an American city. He later ran without success as a Socialist candidate for Governor of Massachusetts and New York, and as a Congressional candidate in Ohio and West Virginia.

== Early life ==
John Calvin Chase was born in Gilmanton, New Hampshire, on May 27, 1870, to a working class family. When John was just 1 year old the family moved to the small town of Ossipee, where his father Levi M. Chase met with an accident that caused his death. John and his four siblings were left in the care of his mother Lynthia, who relocated to yet another small New Hampshire town, this time Milton Mills to work in the woolen mills there.

John followed his mother into the mills, going to work for the first time at the age of just 9 years old. The family relocated frequently in search of steady work, living also in Sanford, Maine, and Barnstead, New Hampshire.

At the age of 13 he went to work in a shoe factory for the first time. He joined the Boot and Shoe Workers' Union in 1888 and was subsequently elected as a delegate to that organization's annual convention.

Chase moved to the town of Haverhill, Massachusetts in 1890 to work in a shoe factory there. Chase's trade union activities soon lead to his being made unemployable in the shoe industry, so he instead helped to establish a cooperative grocery store in Haverhill, which provided him a source of work.

== Political career ==
Chase was a member of the People's Party (the so-called "Populists") during the first half of the 1890s. In 1894, Haverhill's Populists joined a broad reform coalition with the Socialist Labor Party of America, the Prohibition Party, and other unaffiliated progressives, running a slate of candidates for city office. John Chase was one of the nominees of this coalition for city office.

In the aftermath of the 1894 campaign Chase himself joined the Socialist Labor Party, joining a new Haverhill local established by the organization. Chase was soon a committed member of that Marxist party, running for Massachusetts Attorney General on the SLP ticket in the election of 1896.

Local Haverhill SLP had objections to the national organization's policy of dual unionism towards the established unions of the American Federation of Labor. In February 1898 Chase returned Section Haverhill's SLP charter to the national office in New York City, thereby ending its connection with the party. The following month Chase was acting as organizer of a new Haverhill local of the Social Democratic Party of America, an organization headed by Victor L. Berger and Eugene V. Debs. Chase quickly accumulated 60 membership applications for the new organization, thereby transforming the former Section Haverhill SLP into Local Haverhill SDP.

=== Mayor of Haverhill ===
Following a defeat in the November 1898 campaign for the Massachusetts State Senate, in which he finished second in a field of four candidates, the next month Chase headed the SDP ticket as the party's candidate for mayor of Haverhill, emerging victorious by a plurality of 356 votes. Chase thus became the first socialist elected mayor of an American city. Chase was joined in elected office by three newly elected Socialist aldermen as members of the Haverhill Common Council. This success was tempered by the fact that the Haverhill Common Council had 21 members at the time, relegating the socialists to a minority position in the civic government.

Although formerly a shoe factory worker, by the early 1900s Chase was the proprietor of a newsstand in Haverhill. (1901 ad.)

The 1898 SDP program for Haverhill called for establishment of the initiative and referendum, municipal ownership of public utilities, public works jobs for unemployed workers, elimination of unguarded railway crossings, and free clothing for poor children so that they would be able to attend school.

Chase's mayoral victory as the first socialist mayor in America captured the imagination of the left wing press. Julius Wayland, editor of the weekly Appeal to Reason declared that "the mere casting of these 2500 votes has done more to direct attention to Socialism than could have been done with any other means." Paul Tyner of the news magazine The Arena offered the hope that Chase's victory would usher in a series of local victories for the socialist movement in the country.

Chase was re-elected as mayor of Haverhill in 1899, defeating a so-called "fusion" candidate jointly nominated by the Democratic and Republican Parties. He was defeated in another bid for reelection in the 1900 election, however.

=== Socialist Party ===
In the summer of 1901 the Social Democratic Party merged with another organization of the same name and smaller groups to form the Socialist Party of America (SPA). Chase was elected the first Secretary of Local Haverhill SPA at the time of its formation. Not long after, Chase was named a national organizer and lecturer for this organization, traveling the country and speaking on the new party's behalf.

In 1902 and 1903 Chase was named the Socialist Party's candidate for governor of Massachusetts. Chase captured more than 8.4% of the votes cast during the first of these campaigns and almost 6.4% in the second effort.

=== Later political activity ===
Chase was later elected State Secretary of the Socialist Party of New York, the New York state affiliate of the SPA.

In 1906 Chase was selected to head the Socialist Party ticket as its candidate for governor of New York. He received 21,751 votes in this effort, nearly 1.5% of the total ballots cast.

Chase ran for U.S. Congress three times as a Socialist, running in the 14th District of Ohio in 1920, and the 2nd District of West Virginia in 1922 and 1924.

== Death and legacy ==
John C. Chase died January 27, 1937, at New Brighton, Pennsylvania.

Some of Chase's papers reside in the Socialist Party of New York records located at the Tamiment Library and Robert F. Warner Labor Archives at Bobst Library on the campus of New York University.

== See also ==
- List of elected socialist mayors in the United States
- Frederic O. MacCartney

== Works ==
- "Municipal Socialism in America," The Outlook, January 24, 1900, pp. 249–257.
- "Millennium Dawn in Massachusetts," Wilshire's Magazine, January 1903, pp. 61–63.
- "How I Became a Socialist," The Comrade [New York], 1903, pg. 109.
