= Curtis Guild Jr. =

American politician (1860–1915)

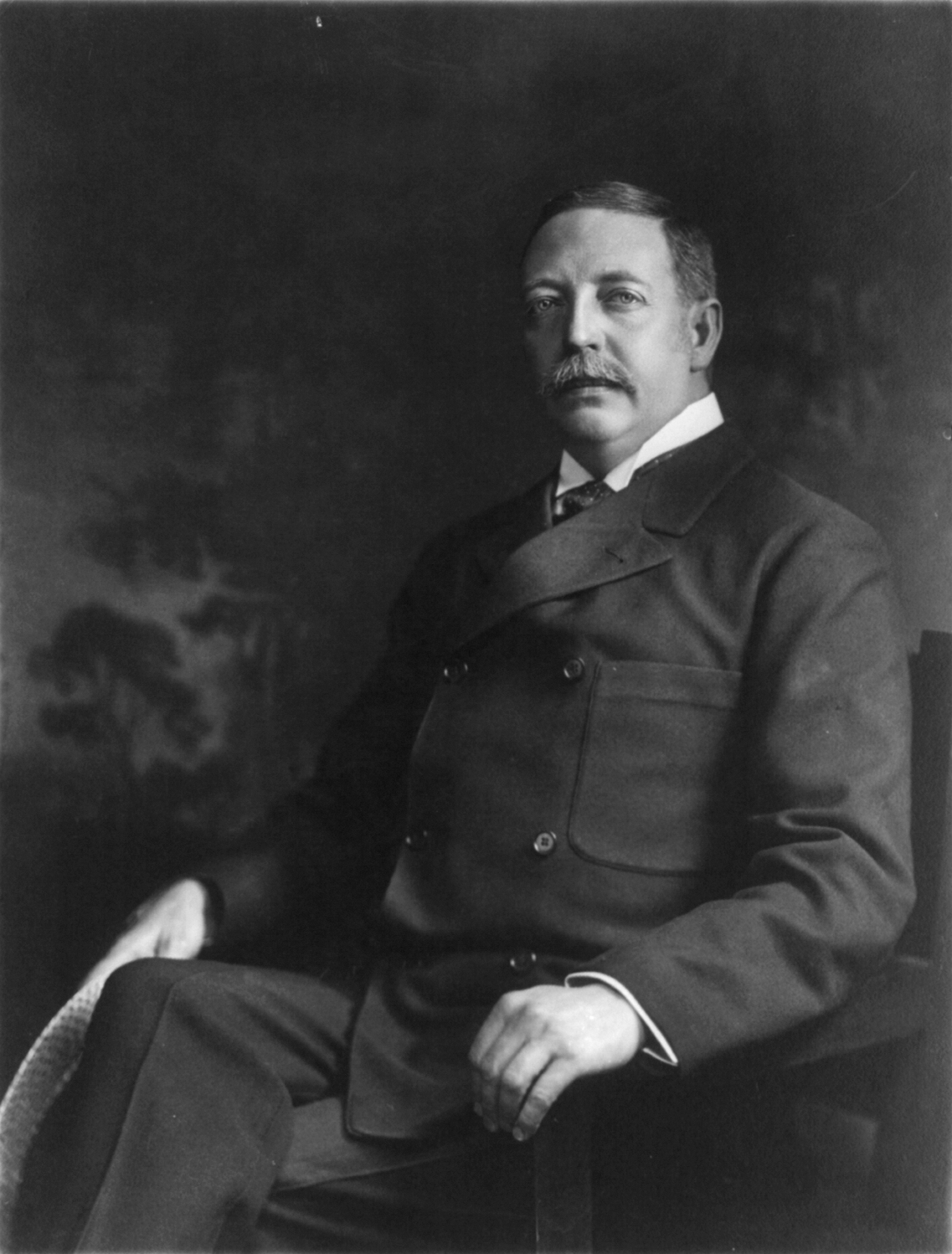
- c. 1905 portrait photograph by John Garo

United States Ambassador to Russia
- In office August 17, 1911 – April 24, 1913
- President: William Howard Taft; Woodrow Wilson
- Preceded by: William Woodville Rockhill
- Succeeded by: George T. Marye

43rd Governor of Massachusetts
- In office January 4, 1906 – January 7, 1909
- Lieutenant: Eben Sumner Draper
- Preceded by: William L. Douglas
- Succeeded by: Eben Sumner Draper

39th Lieutenant Governor of Massachusetts
- In office January 8, 1903 – January 4, 1906
- Governor: John L. Bates; William L. Douglas
- Preceded by: John L. Bates
- Succeeded by: Eben Sumner Draper

Member of the Massachusetts House of Representatives
- In office 1881

Personal details
- Born: February 2, 1860 Boston, Massachusetts, U.S.
- Died: April 6, 1915 (aged 55) Boston, Massachusetts, U.S.
- Party: Republican
- Profession: Politician

Curtis Guild Jr. (February 2, 1860 – April 6, 1915) was an American journalist, soldier, diplomat and politician from Massachusetts. He was the 43rd governor of Massachusetts, serving from 1906 to 1909. Prior to his election as governor, Guild served in the Massachusetts Volunteer Militia, seeing active duty in Cuba during the Spanish–American War. He was publisher of the Boston Commercial Bulletin, a trade publication started by his father.

Educated at Harvard, where he became a close friend of Theodore Roosevelt, Guild was like Roosevelt, a progressive Republican, active in the party organization from 1881. During his tenure as governor, a number of social, labor, and government reforms were enacted. After leaving that office, he was considered a potential candidate for Vice President of the United States in 1908, and served for two years as United States Ambassador to Russia.

== Early life and education ==
Curtis Guild Jr. was born in Boston, Massachusetts on February 2, 1860, to Curtis Guild Sr. and Sarah Crocker (Cobb) Guild. Guild's family had deep colonial roots, descending from John Guild, who settled Dedham in 1636. His mother was descended from David Cobb, a veteran of the American Revolutionary War. Guild's father was the founder and publisher of the Commercial Bulletin, a Boston trade publication. Guild was educated at Chauncy Hall, a private day school in Boston, and then attended Harvard University. At both schools he was involved in military organizations, rising to become a lieutenant in Harvard's rifle corps in 1879. He was also a good fencer, twice winning the university fencing championship, and worked as a writer on both The Harvard Crimson and The Harvard Lampoon. He graduated from Harvard in 1881 with high honors, and was the orator of his class. During his years at Harvard he became friends with Theodore Roosevelt.

== Business and military activities ==
After graduation from college, Guild undertook a short tour of Europe before beginning employment at his father's newspaper. He rose through the ranks of the business, making rounds of local woolen manufacturers weekly for news, and developing the Bulletin into an authoritative journal of the trade. He took over proprietorship of the publication in 1902.

Guild also continued the military activities he had begun during his school years. In 1891, Guild joined the Massachusetts Volunteer Militia, earning the rank of brigadier general by 1898. During these years of service he researched the latest techniques in the use and handling of rifles, and was appointed the militia's Inspector General of Rifle Practice by Governor Roger Wolcott. Following the sinking of the USS Maine in 1898, Guild immediately volunteered for service in the Spanish–American War that followed and was commissioned as a lieutenant colonel and inspector general in May. He served as Inspector General of Havana during the American occupation. He was mustered out of the Army in May 1899. He officially retired from the Massachusetts Volunteer Militia in 1909 with the rank of major general.

== Political career ==
Guild was, along with Roger Wolcott, one of the organizers of the "Young Republican Club" (later just the "Republican Club"), founded in 1891 to inject new life into the Republican Party in Massachusetts. It was established to counter a similar organization founded by Democrats, and to promote the career of Henry Cabot Lodge. The club was instrumental in gaining the 1891 party nomination for Charles H. Allen as Governor of Massachusetts; he ended up losing to incumbent William Russell.

Guild entered politics in 1881, serving as a member of the Massachusetts House of Representatives. He became a member of the state Republican Party Committee in 1894 and became nationally prominent when he served as vice-president of the 1896 Republican National Convention. In 1900 he worked on Roosevelt's vice presidential campaign, and toured with Roosevelt after President William McKinley's assassination elevated Roosevelt to the presidency.

=== Lieutenant governor ===
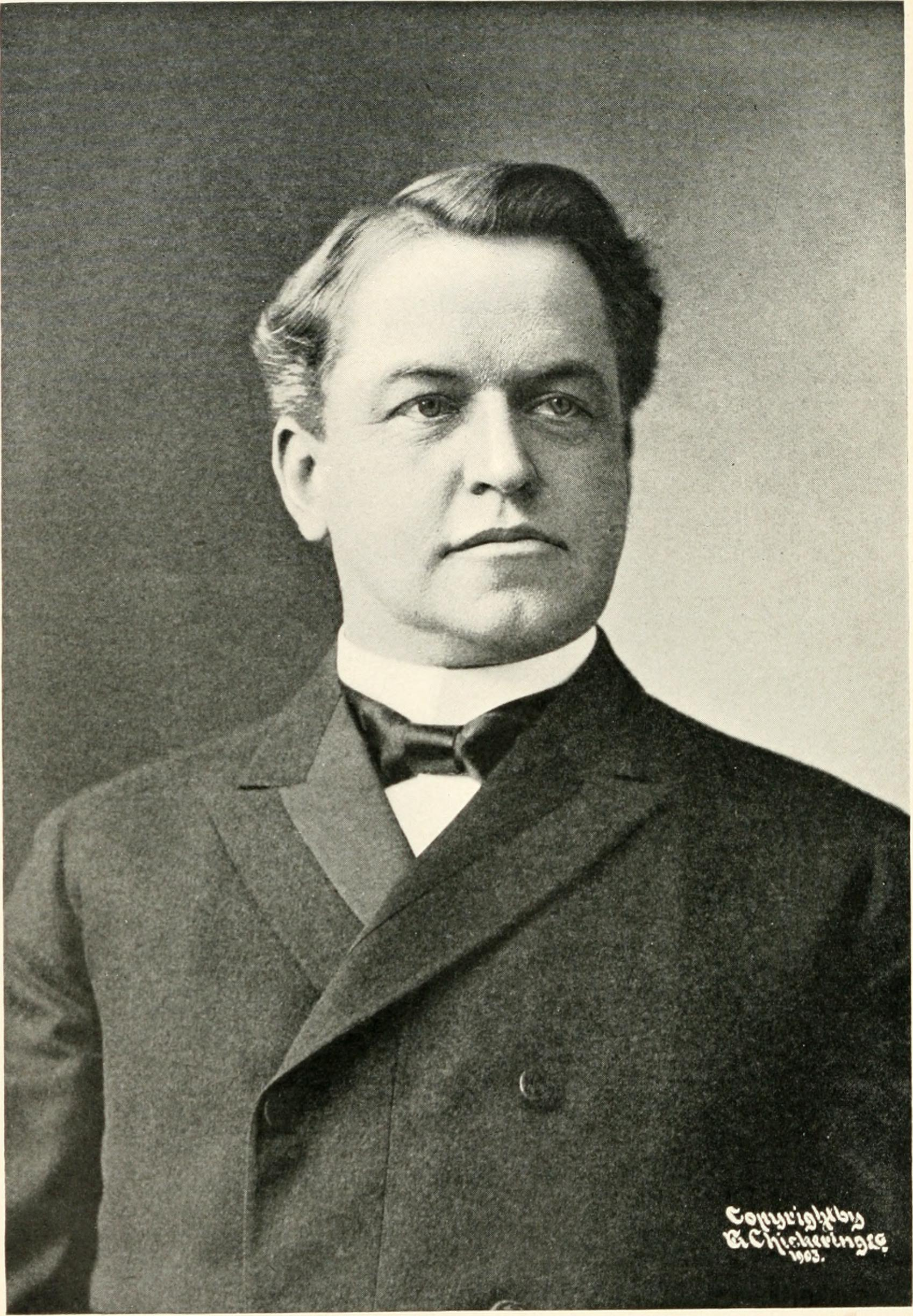
John L. Bates, published 1905

In 1899, Guild was put forward as the party leadership's (in particular Lodge's) choice as the next Lieutenant Governor of Massachusetts. In the state convention, he was somewhat unexpectedly upset in this bid by John L. Bates, who won the nomination without significant party leadership support. The party closed ranks and supported Bates, who served as lieutenant governor 1900-03 and then governor 1903–05. Given the party's escalator-style management of potential officeholders, Guild was not again tapped for the lieutenant governor's nomination until the 1902 election. In that election, he garnered more votes for his office than Bates did for the governorship, although both were victorious. In 1904 Bates was defeated for reelection by Democrat William L. Douglas, while Guild was reelected to the second chair.

=== Governor ===
Following the party process, Guild received the nomination for governor in 1905. The major issue within the party that year was reciprocity, or tariff reform equalizing trade with neighboring Canada. Guild stood in favor of reciprocity, but much of the more conservative party leadership did not, and the lieutenant governor nomination went to Eben Sumner Draper, a wealthy businessman and strong protectionist. The Republicans won a comfortable victory against a disorganized Democratic opposition. Guild served three one-year terms, before stepping back in favor of Draper.

As governor, Guild was one of the most progressive of period, seeing enaction of a significant body of reform legislation. The state required medical inspections of school children, and passed a corrupt practices bill banning corporate contributions to political campaigns. Night work for women and children was banned, a state-run employment service was started, and regulations governing inspection of factories for health and labor violations were strengthened. Communications companies and natural gas distributors were also placed under state regulation. Guild also made a number of distinctive appointments. He appointed the state's first Italian-American judges, as well as two Jewish judges, and an African-American court clerk.

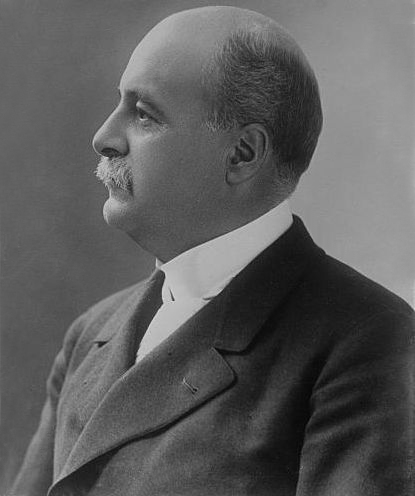
Eben Sumner Draper, 1914 photograph

The provision of state-funded care for the state's mental patients, mandated by the state legislature in 1900 and introduced in 1904, had caused a significant expansion of the state budget (by more than $1 million, about 10% of the budget), without an accompanying increase in revenue. Guild, who inherited this funding problem from his predecessors, called unsuccessfully for increases in corporate taxes in a bid to close the gap, but was only able to secure the introduction of an inheritance tax. Guild would, after he left office, chair the founding meeting of the National Tax Association, and helped draft a model income tax law.

One issue that divided Guild from the more conservative elements of his party was his opposition to attempts by the railroad executives to bypass state law banning the merger of the Boston and Maine Railroad with the New York, New Haven and Hartford Railroad; this was effected de facto through the use of holding companies, and then legislatively approved, after the fact, during the Draper administration.

In 1907, an escaped asylum patient entered the Massachusetts State House with a handgun. Upon seeing a group of men entering the State House, the patient fired, killing Edward Cohen, a trade union leader, mistakenly believing him to be the governor.

During much of 1908, Guild was seriously ill (with pneumonia and appendicitis), and was unable to carry out his office. During these periods, Lieutenant Governor Draper acted as governor. In another act highlighting the divisions within the party, Draper vetoed one of Guild's choices for commissioner of the state's board of labor statistics, for his pro-labor stance.

== Diplomat ==
After his tenure as governor ended, Guild received support for the 1908 Republican nomination for Vice President, but did not win the nomination. In 1910 President William Howard Taft appointed Guild as a special ambassador to the Mexican independence centennial. Taft then appointed him to be the United States Ambassador to Russia, a position he held from 1911 until 1913. He was thrust into a touchy diplomatic situation on his arrival. Americans had become increasingly vocal about Russian treatment of its minorities, in particular Jews, who had been subjected pogroms and had fled to the US in significant numbers. Formerly Russian Jewish holders of American passports were also being subjected to added scrutiny and harassment by Russian authorities. A bill was passed by Congress in 1911 abrogating an 1832 commerce treaty between the countries, which went into effect in January 1913, resulting in higher tariffs and reduced Russian imports. This took place after Guild's predecessor, William Woodville Rockhill, had recently promoted closer economic ties between the countries, including the possibility of major US investment in the improvement of Russia's backward infrastructure. Guild was thus placed in the embarrassing position of formally delivering the nation's intent to abrogate the treaty. He also had to explain the Congressional position to Foreign Minister Sergey Sazonov, who took issue with what he saw as an essentially moral crusade. This inspired anger in the Russian leadership and press, and prompted a further popular backlash against its Jewish population. The affair marked a low point in relations between the US and Imperial Russia.

== Later life and death ==
After finishing his ambassadorial duties, Guild returned to Boston, and resumed control of the Commercial Bulletin. He died on April 6, 1915, after a brief illness. He is interred at Boston's Forest Hills Cemetery.

He had married Charlotte Howe Johnson, daughter of Edward Crosby Johnson and Alice Robbins, in 1892; they had no children.

== Honors ==
Awards that he received include the Russian Order of St. Alexander Nevsky and the Order of the Crown of Italy; the latter was awarded for steps taken by Guild to minimize the swindling of Italian immigrants. He was an active Freemason and a member of the Massachusetts Historical Society. In 1897 he became a compatriot of the Massachusetts Society of the Sons of the American Revolution. He was also a member of the General Society of Colonial Wars.

== Legacy ==
After Guild's death, a memorial tablet, paid for by private subscription, was installed in the Massachusetts State House in 1916. The Curtis Guild Elementary School in East Boston is named for the former governor, and the Massachusetts National Guard Base Camp Curtis Guild is named in his memory. The defunct Camp Curtis Guild Composite Squadron of the Massachusetts Wing of the Civil Air Patrol bore his name.

== Sources ==
- Abrams, Richard (1964). Conservatism in a Progressive Era: Massachusetts Politics 1900-1912. Cambridge, MA: Harvard University Press. OCLC 475077.
- Brandeis, Louis (1971). Letters of Louis Brandeis: Volume II, 1907-1912: People's Attorney. Albany, NY: SUNY Press. ISBN 9780873950916. OCLC 149993.
- Higgins-Evenson, R. Rudy (2003). The Price of progress: public services, taxation, and the American corporate state, 1877 to 1929. Baltimore, MD: Johns Hopkins University Press. ISBN 9780801875892. OCLC 475250860.
- Hill, Edwin (1919). The Historical Register. New York: Edwin Hill. p. 30. OCLC 7782556.
- Jones, J.E. (June 1908). "New England's Choice for the Vice-Presidency". The National Magazine.
- Mayers, David (1996) [1995]. The Ambassadors and America's Soviet Policy. New York: Oxford University Press. ISBN 9780195115765. OCLC 37828502.
- National Association of Wool Manufacturers (1915). Bulletin, Volume 45. Boston. OCLC 42341986.
- Sammarco, Anthony (2009). Forest Hills Cemetery. Charleston, SC: Arcadia Publishing. ISBN 9781439620519. OCLC 677921414.
- Thayer, William (1917). Curtis Guild. Boston: Massachusetts Historical Society. OCLC 235945904.
- Williams, Andrew J (1992). Trading with the Bolsheviks: The Politics of East-West Trade, 1920-1939. Manchester, UK: Manchester University Press. ISBN 9780719033308. OCLC 26553046.

Party political offices
Preceded by John L. Bates	Republican nominee for Governor of Massachusetts; 1905, 1906, 1907	Succeeded by Eben Sumner Draper
Political offices
Preceded by John L. Bates	Lieutenant Governor of Massachusetts; 1903–1906	Succeeded by Eben Sumner Draper
Preceded by William L. Douglas	Governor of Massachusetts; 1906–1909	Succeeded by Eben Sumner Draper
Diplomatic posts
Preceded by William Woodville Rockhill	United States Ambassador to Russia; 1911–1913	Succeeded by George T. Marye
