= 1911 Massachusetts legislature =

132nd Massachusetts General Court
←	131st	133rd	→

Overview
- Legislative body: General Court
- Election: November 8, 1910

Senate
- Members: 40
- President: Allen T. Treadway
- Party control: Republican (26–14)

House
- Members: 240
- Speaker: Joseph Walker
- Party control: Republican (127–112–1)

Sessions
- 1st: January 4, 1911 – July 28, 1911

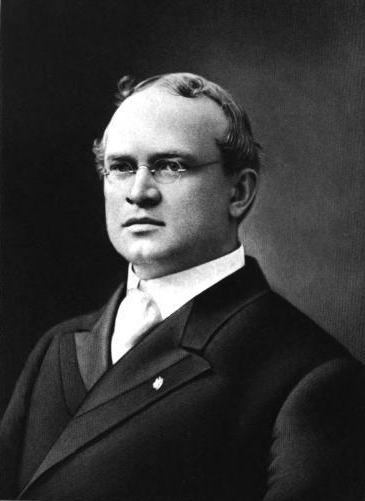
Allen Treadway, Senate president.

Joseph Walker, House speaker.

Leaders of the Massachusetts General Court, 1911.

The 132nd Massachusetts General Court, consisting of the Massachusetts Senate and the Massachusetts House of Representatives, met in 1911 during the governorship of Eugene Foss. Allen T. Treadway served as president of the Senate and Joseph Walker served as speaker of the House.

== Senators ==
Portrait	Name	Date of birth	District	Party
	Arthur S. Adams	February 14, 1869	2nd Essex	
	George L. Barnes		1st Norfolk	
	Frank P. Bennett Jr.	December 30, 1878	7th Middlesex	Republican
	Charles V. Blanchard	February 2, 1866	3rd Middlesex	Republican
	Charles H. Brown	January 19, 1879	6th Middlesex	
	Charles S. Chace		1st Bristol	
	Martin P. F. Curley		8th Suffolk	Democratic
	Daniel E. Denny	July 14, 1845	2nd Worcester	
	James H. Doyle		4th Suffolk	
	Wilmot R. Evans Jr.		4th Middlesex	
	Joseph S. Gates	October 3, 1856	4th Worcester	
	Edward J. Grainger		1st Suffolk	
	Levi H. Greenwood	December 22, 1872	3rd Worcester	Republican
	Dennis E. Halley		5th Essex	
	James A. Hatton		2nd Suffolk	
	Joseph H. Hibbard		8th Middlesex	
	Roger Sherman Hoar	April 8, 1887	5th Middlesex	Democratic
	John H. Hunt		1st Worcester	
	Roland M. Keith	March 16, 1847	2nd Plymouth	
	Joseph P. Lomasney		3rd Suffolk	Democratic
	John H. Mack		Berkshire	
	John F. Malley		1st Hampden	
	Walter B. Mellen		Worcester and Hampden	
	Henry C. Mulligan		1st Middlesex	
	Michael J. Murray	July 11, 1860	9th Suffolk	
	Melvin S. Nash	August 3, 1857	1st Plymouth	
	Arthur L. Nason	October 24, 1872	4th Essex	
	George H. Newhall	October 24, 1850	1st Essex	Republican
	Charles H. Pearson		2nd Norfolk	
	James F. Powers	October 1, 1872	6th Suffolk	
	Francis X. Quigley	November 20, 1882	2nd Hampden	
	Samuel Ross	February 2, 1865	3rd Bristol	
	John H. Schoonmaker	February 14, 1869	Franklin and Hampshire	
	Harry N. Stearns	October 5, 1874	2nd Middlesex	
	James P. Timilty	March 28, 1865	7th Suffolk	Democratic
	George H. Tinkham	October 29, 1870	5th Suffolk	Republican
	James E. Tolman	November 8, 1867	3rd Essex	Republican
	Allen T. Treadway	September 16, 1867	Berkshire, Hampshire and Hampden	Republican
	Joseph Turner		2nd Bristol	
	John E. White	December 13, 1873	Cape	Republican

== Representatives ==
image	name	date of birth	district
	David C. Ahearn	November 4, 1879	
	Timothy J. Ahern		
	Oscar E. Arkwell		
	William M. Armstrong	August 17, 1850	
	Alfred Arseneault	January 3, 1869	
	Frank W. Atkins		
	William B. Avery	July 11, 1856	
	Aaron Bagg Jr.		
	Edward C. R. Bagley		
	J. Herbert Baker		
	Willie W. Baker		
	Erson B. Barlow	October 20, 1883	
	James F. Barry	December 4, 1857	
	John J. Barry	January 4, 1877	
	Frederick D. Bartlett		
	John J. Bastion		
	James W. Bean	May 11, 1866	
	William A. Bellamy		
	Alvin E. Bliss		
	Charles M. Blodgett		
	Edward C. Bodfish		
	Arthur Bogue		
	William Booth	June 21, 1862	
	Henry E. Bothfeld	March 4, 1859	
	George E. Bowker		
	John G. Brackett		
	Melvin B. Breath	March 28, 1881	
	Lincoln Breckenridge		
	James Henry Brennan	December 21, 1888	
	James J. Brennan	May 2, 1882	
	Francis J. Brennan		
	Michael J. Brophy		
	Herbert N. Buck		
	John P. Buckley	May 31, 1853	
	William R. Burke	July 14, 1870	
	George R. Burns	January 4, 1882	
	James D. Burns	July 4, 1876	
	Adolphus M. Burroughs		
	Thomas F. J. Callahan		
	John J. Carmody		
	Charles L. Carr	December 25, 1876	
	Patrick B. Carr		
	John Carr		
	Thomas J. Casey		
	James F. Cavanagh		
	Fred P. Chapman		
	Wendell P. Clark		
	Allen Clark		
	Zebedee E. Cliff	September 23, 1864	
	John Henry Cogswell	July 4, 1875	
	Samuel I. Collins	March 4, 1851	
	Francis L. Colpoys		
	Daniel L. Connolly		
	John D. Connors		
	Eli M. Converse		
	John J. Conway		
	Leon M. Conwell	April 15, 1870	
	James H. L. Coon		
	Michael H. Cotter		
	Channing H. Cox	October 28, 1879	
	Russell D. Crane		
	Courtenay Crocker	February 4, 1881	
	Daniel Francis Cronin		
	William A. Crowley		
	Thomas S. Cuff		
	Thomas P. Curtin		
	Grafton D. Cushing	August 4, 1864	
	Alfred W. Cushman		
	George T. Daly		
	David H. Damon		
	Henry G. Danforth	February 6, 1843	
	Thomas Davies	February 11, 1875	
	Arthur S. Davis		
	Nathan W. Davis		
	Daniel P. Day		
	Charles A. Dean	March 26, 1856	
	George L. Dow		
	Andrew P. Doyle	August 15, 1869	
	Lawrence J. Dugan		
	John F. Dwyer		
	James Frank Eagan		
	Harry Millett Eames		
	Charles N. Edgell		
	George W. W. Edson		
	Charles W. Eldridge	October 16, 1877	
	George H. Ellis	October 3, 1848	
	Charles E. Elwell		
	Wilton B. Fay		
	Edward Fisher		
	James H. Fitzgerald		
	John T. Flanagan	May 25, 1869	
	Harold H. Flower		
	Clarence J. Fogg	July 10, 1853	
	Louis A. Foley		
	Herbert M. Forristall	August 14, 1859	
	Benjamin D. Gifford		
	William H. Gifford	January 20, 1851	
	Ellery L. Goff		
	William J. Graham	October 2, 1873	
	James I. Green	April 9, 1885	
	Fred Parker Greenwood		
	James F. Griffin	January 19, 1884	
	John W. Haigis	July 31, 1881	
	Benjamin F. Haines	November 25, 1876	
	William Halliday		
	Portus B. Hancock	February 19, 1836	
	Clarence W. Harding		
	Leonard F. Hardy		
	Frank O. Hardy		
	Edward F. Harrington (state representative)	August 10, 1878	
	James A. Hart	October 29, 1864	
	Edward R. Hathaway		
	Horatio Hathaway Jr.		
	Truman R. Hawley		
	Michael A. Henebery		
	Michael Hennessey		
	William P. Hickey	November 17, 1871	
	Merrick E. Hildreth		
	Francis M. Hill		
	Clarence Whitman Hobbs Jr.	October 1, 1878	
	Henry W. Holbrook	February 18, 1875	
	Joseph W. Holden	October 10, 1867	
	Alexander Holmes		
	Charles T. Holt	August 1, 1845	
	Harry L. Howard		
	William N. Howard		
	Charles H. Howe		
	William S. Hoyt		
	John J. Hughes		
	Lyman E. Hurd		
	Frederick W. Hurlburt		
	Edward N. Jenckes		
	David P. Keefe	September 29, 1855	
	Michael Kelly	June 17, 1840	
	James T. Kenney	June 20, 1870	
	Louis R. Kiernan		
	Charles T. Killpartrick		
	Clifford L. King		
	H. Bert Knowles		
	Wilfred J. Lamoureux		
	Louis F. R. Langelier		
	Albert P. Langtry	July 27, 1860	
	Joseph Leonard		
	Charles Lewin		
	Edwin F. Lilley		
	Martin Lomasney	December 3, 1859	
	Paul I. Lombard		
	William J. Look	June 20, 1867	
	Herman A. MacDonald	November 11, 1881	
	James P. Maguire		
	John C. Mahoney		
	George Edward Marchand	December 22, 1877	
	John F. McCarthy		
	Charles F. McCarthy	August 15, 1876	
	Eugene A. McCarthy		
	Thomas F. McCullough		
	James A. McElaney Jr.		
	John D. McGivern		
	Michael F. McGrath		
	James H. McInerney	December 13, 1871	
	Hugh M. McKay		
	William M. McMorrow		
	Timothy J. Meade	November 7, 1874	
	John F. Meaney		
	Joseph F. Merritt		
	David T. Montague		
	Charles H. Morgan	January 15, 1869	
	Charles H. Morrill	October 6, 1874	
	Edward T. Morse		
	Frank Mulveny		
	Dennis A. Murphy	September 26, 1876	
	James J. Murphy	February 11, 1885	
	David W. Murray	September 9, 1874	
	William J. Murray	October 7, 1885	
	William L. Newton		
	Clarence V. Nickerson		
	Albin F. Nordbeck		
	C. Augustus Norwood		
	Michael F. O'Brien	September 18, 1878	
	Charles R. O'Connell	September 16, 1874	
	Francis D. O'Donnell		
	William A. O'Hearn	March 8, 1887	
	Jeremiah O'Leary		
	Dennis A. O'Neil	June 16, 1882	
	Charles A. Orstrom		
	Frank A. Palmer		
	Joseph H. Parker Jr.	April 16, 1871	
	Joseph A. Parks	May 2, 1877	
	Asa L. Pattee		
	Harry A. Penniman		
	Frank H. Pope	March 7, 1854	
	Alfred J. Preece		
	John J. Purcell		
	Harry Bancroft Putnam	September 7, 1878	
	Martin Lewis Quinn	January 19, 1862	
	Michael F. Quinn		
	Joseph J. Reed		
	Albert C. Reed		
	Michael J. Reidy		
	George A. Ricker		
	Ralph R. Rideout		
	Thomas Ryan		
	John Lee Saltonstall	May 23, 1878	
	John C. Sanborn		
	Edgar E. Sargent		
	Amos T. Saunders		
	Frederick W. Schlapp		
	Alfred Scigliano		
	Michael J. Scully		
	Norman Shannon		
	Benjamin Sharp	1858	
	Albert H. Silvester		
	Theodore L. Sorenson		
	George H. Stevens		
	William J. Sullivan	April 14, 1865	
	Edward A. Sweeney		
	Daniel W. Teehan		
	Alfred Tewksbury		
	William R. Thomas	September 24, 1871	
	Eugene F. Toomey		
	Nathan A. Tufts	April 15, 1879	
	Robert N. Turner		
	Charles L. Underhill	July 20, 1867	
	Alton A. Upton		
	Robert M. Washburn	January 4, 1868	
	Henry Gordon Wells	October 12, 1879	
	William H. Wheeler		
	Thomas W. White	January 10, 1876	
	Norman H. White	December 25, 1871	
	Isaac E. Willetts	November 8, 1879	
	Ernest A. Witt		
	Roger Wolcott	July 25, 1877	
	Charles J. Wood	March 18, 1854	
	Russell A. Wood		
	Augustus E. Wright		

== See also ==
- 1911 Massachusetts gubernatorial election
- 62nd United States Congress
- List of Massachusetts General Courts
