= 1908 Massachusetts Senate election =

1908 Massachusetts Senate elections
- November 4, 1908

All 40 seats in the Massachusetts Senate 21 seats needed for a majority
	Majority party	Minority party
Party	Republican	Democratic
Seats won	34	6
Seat change	▲3	▼3
Popular vote	294,676	175,085
Percentage	60.6%	36.0%

Elections to the Massachusetts Senate were held on November 4, 1908, to elect 40 State Senators to the 130th Massachusetts General Court. Candidates were elected at the district level, with many districts covering multiple towns or counties.

== Results summary ==
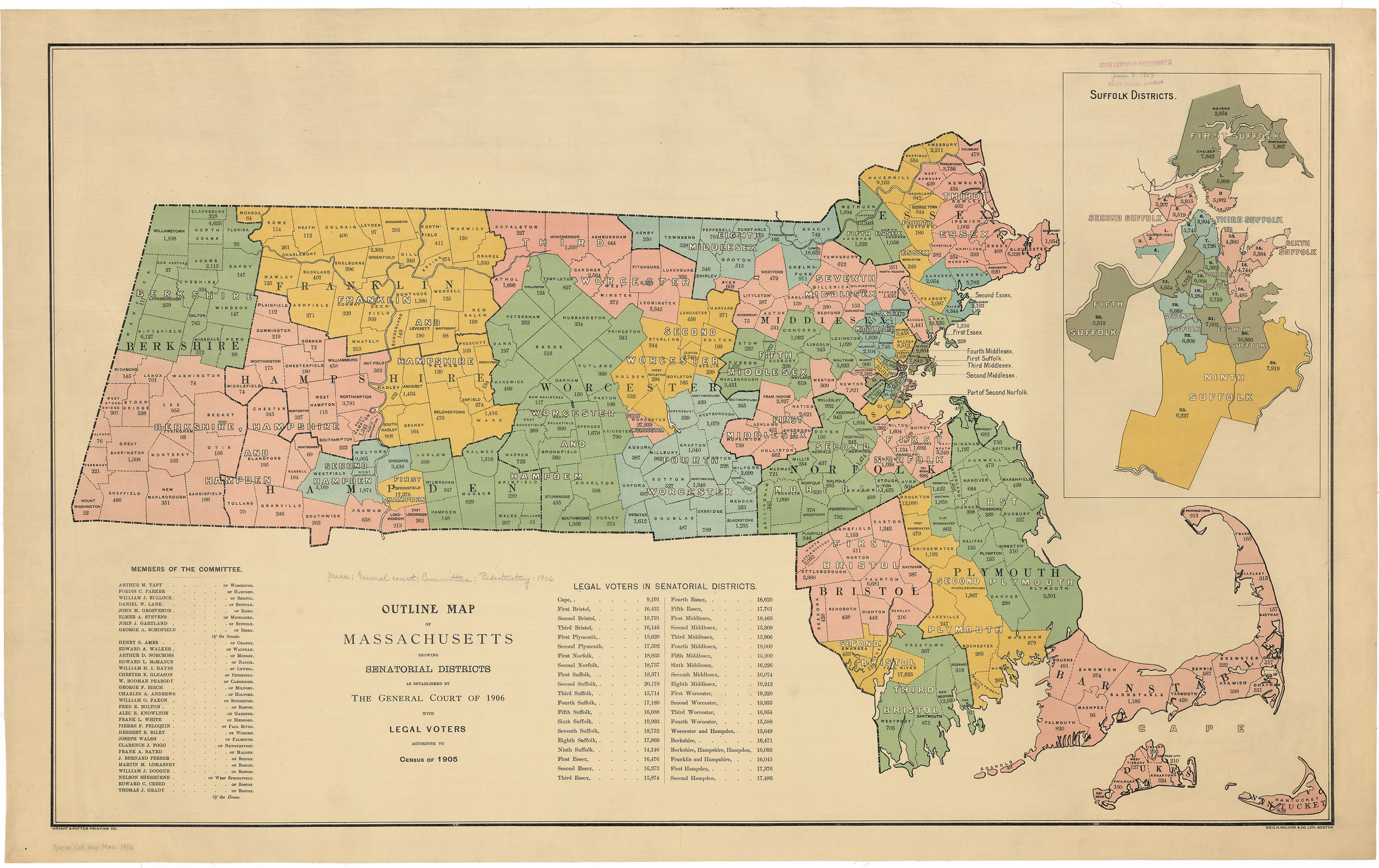
Senate districts as apportioned in 1906

Parties	Seats		Popular vote	
Parties	1908	Strength	Vote	%
Republican Party	34	85.0%	294,676	60.6%
Democratic Party	6	15.0%	175,085	36.0%
Independence League	—	—	10,795	2.2%
Socialist Party	—	—	5,035	1.0%
Prohibition Party	—	—	547	0.1%
Independent	—	—	468	0.1%
Others	—	—	47	0.0%
Totals	40	100.0%	486,653	100.0%

== District results ==
=== Berkshire ===
==== Apportionment ====
This district contained the following towns:

- Adams
- Cheshire
- Clarksburg
- Dalton
- Florida
- Hancock
- Hinsdale
- Lanesboro
- New Ashford
- North Adams
- Peru
- Pittsfield
- Savoy
- Williamstown
- Windsor

==== Results ====
1908 Berkshire Senate election
Party	Candidate	Votes	%	±%
Republican	William Turtle	6,208	57.12%	
Democratic	John F. Prindle	4,346	39.99%	
Independence	Frank Fitzsimmons	314	2.89%	
Total votes		10,868	100.00%	

=== Berkshire, Hampshire, and Hampden ===
==== Apportionment ====
This district contained the following towns:

- Agawam
- Alford
- Becket
- Blandford
- Chester
- Cummington
- East Longmeadow
- Easthampton
- Egremont
- Goshen
- Granville
- Great Barrington
- Hatfield
- Huntington
- Lee
- Lenox
- Longmeadow
- Middlefield
- Monterey
- Montgomery
- Mount Washington
- New Marlborough
- Northampton
- Otis
- Plainfield
- Richmond
- Russell
- Sandisfield
- Sheffield
- Southampton
- Southwick
- Stockbridge
- Tolland
- Tyringham
- Washington
- West Stockbridge
- Westhampton
- Williamsburg
- Worthington

==== Results ====
1908 Berkshire, Hampshire, and Hampden Senate election
Party	Candidate	Votes	%	±%
Republican	Allen T. Treadway	5,896	63.63%	
Democratic	Cecil S. Cutler	3,568	38.51%	
Independence	John J. Prokop	436	4.71%	
Prohibition	Wilbur M. Purrington	366	3.95%	
Total votes		9,266	100.00%	

=== First Bristol ===
==== Apportionment ====
This district contained the following towns:

- Attleboro
- Berkley
- Dighton
- Easton
- Mansfield
- North Attleborough
- Norton
- Raynham
- Rehoboth
- Seekonk
- Taunton

==== Results ====
1908 First Bristol Senate election
Party	Candidate	Votes	%	±%
Republican	William M. Dean	5,914	64.90%	
Republican	Albert G. Godfrey (write-in)	2,150	23.59%	
Independence	Michael Joseph Brohen	1,049	11.51%	
Write-in	All others	1	0.00%	{{{change}}}
Total votes		9,114	100.00%	

=== Second Bristol ===
==== Apportionment ====
This district contained the following towns:

- Fall River
- Somerset
- Swansea

==== Results ====
1908 Second Bristol Senate election
Party	Candidate	Votes	%	±%
Republican	Joseph Turner	6,870	58.00%	
Democratic	William Moran	4,496	37.96%	
Independence	Michael Bushnell	478	4.04%	
Total votes		11,844	100.00%	

=== Third Bristol ===
==== Apportionment ====
This district contained the following towns:

- Acushnet
- Dartmouth
- Fairhaven
- Freetown
- New Bedford
- Westport

==== Results ====
1908 Third Bristol Senate election
Party	Candidate	Votes	%	±%
Republican	Samuel Ross	4,651	46.60%	
Republican	Nathaniel P. Sowle (write-in)	3,637	36.44%	
Democratic	Charles G. Wood	1,688	16.91%	
Write-in	All others	5	0.01%	{{{change}}}
Total votes		9,981	100.00%	

=== Cape ===
==== Apportionment ====
This district contained the following towns:

- Barnstable
- Bourne
- Brewster
- Chatham
- Chilmark
- Dennis
- Eastham
- Edgartown
- Falmouth
- Gay Head
- Gosnold
- Harwich
- Mashpee
- Nantucket
- Oak Bluffs
- Orleans
- Provincetown
- Sandwich
- Tisbury
- Truro
- Wellfleet
- West Tisbury
- Yarmouth

==== Results ====
1908 Cape District Senate election
Party	Candidate	Votes	%	±%
Republican	Eben S. Keith	4,070	84.67%	
Democratic	Clarkson P. Bearse	728	15.14%	
Write-in	All others	9	0.19%	{{{change}}}
Total votes		4,807	100.00%	

=== First Essex ===
==== Apportionment ====
This district contained the following towns:

- Lynn (Wards 1–7)
- Nahant
- Swampscott

==== Results ====
1908 First Essex Senate election
Party	Candidate	Votes	%	±%
Republican	William R. Salter	6,915	73.37%	
Democratic	Charles Allen Taber	2,510	26.63%	
Total votes		9,425	100.00%	

=== Second Essex ===
==== Apportionment ====
This district contained the following towns:

- Beverly
- Danvers
- Marblehead
- Salem

==== Results ====
1908 Second Essex Senate election
Party	Candidate	Votes	%	±%
Republican	Clifford B. Bray	6,683	66.57%	
Democratic	Andrew H. Paton	3,356	33.43%	
Total votes		10,039	100.00%	

=== Third Essex ===
==== Apportionment ====
This district contained the following towns:

- Essex
- Gloucester
- Hamilton
- Ipswich
- Manchester
- Newbury
- Newburyport
- Rockport
- Rowley
- Salisbury
- Topsfield
- Wenham
- West Newbury

==== Results ====
1908 Third Essex Senate election
Party	Candidate	Votes	%	±%
Republican	James F. Shaw	4,868	55.63%	
Democratic	Charles D. Smith	3,822	43.68%	
Independence	William H. Adams	611	6.98%	
Total votes		8,751	100.00%	

=== Fourth Essex ===
==== Apportionment ====
This district contained the following towns:

- Amesbury
- Boxford
- Georgetown
- Groveland
- Haverhill
- Merrimac
- Middleton
- Peabody

==== Results ====
1908 Fourth Essex Senate election
Party	Candidate	Votes	%	±%
Republican	Harry P. Morse	6,673	78.10%	
Democratic	Jason Spofford	1,871	21.90%	
Total votes		8,544	100.00%	

=== Fifth Essex ===
==== Apportionment ====
This district contained the following towns:

- Andover
- Lawrence
- Methuen
- North Andover

==== Results ====
1908 Fifth Essex Senate election
Party	Candidate	Votes	%	±%
Republican	George Bunting	6,399	52.56%	
Democratic	Dennis E. Halley	5,338	43.84%	
Socialist	Louis B. Talbot	438	3.60%	
Total votes		12,175	100.00%	

=== Franklin and Hampshire ===
==== Apportionment ====
This district contained the following towns:

- Amherst
- Ashfield
- Belchertown
- Bernardston
- Buckland
- Charlemont
- Colrain
- Conway
- Deerfield
- Enfield
- Erving
- Gill
- Granby
- Greenfield
- Hadley
- Hawley
- Heath
- Leverett
- Leyden
- Monroe
- Montague
- New Salem
- Northfield
- Orange
- Pelham
- Prescott
- Rowe
- Shelburne
- Shutesbury
- South Hadley
- Sunderland
- Ware
- Warwick
- Wendell
- Whately

==== Results ====
1908 Franklin and Hampshire Senate election
Party	Candidate	Votes	%	±%
Republican	Dennis E. Farley	6,321	68.47%	
Democratic	Albert J. Amstein	2,405	26.05%	
Independence	George I. Varney	506	5.48%	
Write-in	All others	2	0.00%	{{{change}}}
Total votes		9,234	100.00%	

=== First Hampden ===
==== Apportionment ====
This district contained the city of Springfield.

==== Results ====
1908 First Hampden Senate election
Party	Candidate	Votes	%	±%
Republican	Francke W. Dickinson	6,185	60.28%	
Democratic	Richard A. Hennessey (Note: Hennessey was also endorsed by the Independence League.)	3,390	33.04%	
Socialist	Samuel M. Jones	685	6.68%	
Total votes		10,260	100.00%	

=== Second Hampden ===
==== Apportionment ====
This district contained the following towns:

- Chicopee
- Holyoke
- West Springfield
- Westfield

==== Results ====
1908 Second Hampden Senate election
Party	Candidate	Votes	%	±%
Democratic	Daniel D. Mahoney	6,062	51.34%	
Republican	Frederick Childs	5,199	44.03%	
Socialist	John R. Kirwin	546	4.62%	
Total votes		11,807	100.00%	

=== First Middlesex ===
==== Apportionment ====
This district contained the following towns:

- Ashland
- Framingham
- Holliston
- Hopkinton
- Natick
- Newton
- Sherborn
- Watertown
- Weston

==== Results ====
1908 First Middlesex Senate election
Party	Candidate	Votes	%	±%
Republican	Henry C. Mulligan	7,477	55.13%	
Democratic	Martin T. Hall	6,084	44.87%	
Total votes		13,561	100.00%	

=== Second Middlesex ===
==== Apportionment ====
This district contained Wards 5 through 11 of Cambridge.

==== Results ====
1908 Second Middlesex Senate election
Party	Candidate	Votes	%	±%
Republican	Thorndike Spalding	5,180	60.61%	
Democratic	J. Joseph Foley	2,989	34.97%	
Independence	Albin M. Richards	378	4.42%	
Total votes		8,547	100.00%	

=== Third Middlesex ===
==== Apportionment ====
This district contained the city of Somerville.

==== Results ====
1908 Third Middlesex Senate election
Party	Candidate	Votes	%	±%
Republican	Elmer A. Stevens	6,765	70.59%	
Democratic	William H. Flynn	2,238	23.35%	
Independence	George E. Gookin	581	6.06%	
Total votes		9,584	100.00%	

=== Fourth Middlesex ===
==== Apportionment ====
This district contained the cities of Everett, Malden, and Melrose.

==== Results ====
1908 Fourth Middlesex Senate election
Party	Candidate	Votes	%	±%
Republican	Wilmot R. Evans	8,200	70.59%	
Democratic	Charles Burleigh	2,883	23.35%	
Write-in	All others	1	0.00%	{{{change}}}
Total votes		11,084	100.00%	

=== Fifth Middlesex ===
==== Apportionment ====
This district contained the following towns:

- Belmont
- Concord
- Hudson
- Lexington
- Lincoln
- Marlboro
- Maynard
- Stow
- Sudbury
- Waltham
- Wayland

==== Results ====
1908 Fifth Middlesex Senate election
Party	Candidate	Votes	%	±%
Republican	John L. Harvey	7,111	58.60%	
Democratic	John J. Burns	4,401	36.27%	
Independence	John J. Burns	622	5.13%	
Write-in	All others	1	0.00%	{{{change}}}
Total votes		12,135	100.00%	

=== Sixth Middlesex ===
==== Apportionment ====
This district contained the following towns:

- Arlington
- Medford
- Stoneham
- Wakefield
- Winchester
- Woburn

==== Results ====
1908 Sixth Middlesex Senate election
Party	Candidate	Votes	%	±%
Republican	J. Howell Crosby	6,933	68.43%	
Democratic	John J. Butler	3,198	31.56%	
Write-in	All others	1	0.00%	{{{change}}}
Total votes		10,132	100.00%	

=== Seventh Middlesex ===
==== Apportionment ====
This district contained the following towns:

- Acton
- Ayer
- Bedford
- Billerica
- Boxboro
- Burlington
- Carlisle
- Littleton
- Lowell (Wards 5 & 9)
- Lynn (Ward 6)
- Lynnfield
- North Reading
- Reading
- Saugus
- Tewksbury
- Westford
- Wilmington

==== Results ====
1908 Seventh Middlesex Senate election
Party	Candidate	Votes	%	±%
Republican	James Wilson Grimes	5,276	55.54%	
Democratic	Isaac E. Graves	3,581	37.69%	
Independence	William H. Brown	642	6.76%	
Write-in	All others	1	0.00%	{{{change}}}
Total votes		9,500	100.00%	

=== Eighth Middlesex ===
==== Apportionment ====
This district contained the following towns:

- Ashby
- Chelmsford
- Dracut
- Dunstable
- Groton
- Lowell (Wards 1–4, 6–8)
- Pepperell
- Shirley
- Townsend
- Tyngsboro

==== Results ====
1908 Eighth Middlesex Senate election
Party	Candidate	Votes	%	±%
Republican	Joseph H. Hibbard	6,236	50.06%	
Democratic	James E. O'Donnell	5,830	46.80%	
Socialist	William J. Carroll	235	1.89%	
Independence	Hugh Gallagher	156	1.25%	
Total votes		12,457	100.00%	

=== First Norfolk ===
==== Apportionment ====
This district contained the following towns:

- Braintree
- Canton
- Holbrook
- Hyde Park
- Milton
- Quincy
- Randolph
- Weymouth

==== Results ====
1908 First Norfolk Senate election
Party	Candidate	Votes	%	±%
Republican	Eugene Hultman	7,873	64.40%	
Democratic	James E. Foley	3,711	30.36%	
Socialist	John J. Gallagher	641	5.24%	
Total votes		12,225	100.00%	

=== Second Norfolk ===
==== Apportionment ====
This district contained the following towns:

- Avon
- Bellingham
- Brookline
- Dedham
- Dover
- Foxboro
- Franklin
- Medfield
- Medway
- Millis
- Needham
- Norfolk
- Norwood
- Plainville
- Sharon
- Stoughton
- Walpole
- Wellesley
- Westwood
- Wrentham

==== Results ====
1908 Second Norfolk Senate election
Party	Candidate	Votes	%	±%
Republican	Bradley M. Rockwood	8,669	72.71%	
Democratic	James M. Lynch	3,245	27.22%	
Write-in	All others	8	0.07%	{{{change}}}
Total votes		11,922	100.00%	

=== First Plymouth ===
==== Apportionment ====
This district contained the following towns:

- Abington
- Carver
- Cohasset
- Duxbury
- East Bridgewater
- Halifax
- Hanover
- Hanson
- Hingham
- Hull
- Kingston
- Marshfield
- Norwell
- Pembroke
- Plymouth
- Plympton
- Rockland
- Scituate
- Whitman

==== Results ====
1908 First Plymouth Senate election
Party	Candidate	Votes	%	±%
Republican	Melvin S. Nash	5,696	66.67%	
Democratic	Benjamin F. Peterson	1,733	20.28%	
Socialist	Thomas H. Dunn	468	5.48%	
Independence	Elmer L. Smith	466	5.45%	
Prohibition	Orion L. Griswold	181	2.12%	
Total votes		8,544	100.00%	

=== Second Plymouth ===
==== Apportionment ====
This district contained the following towns:

- Bridgewater
- Brockton
- Lakeville
- Marion
- Mattapoisett
- Middleboro
- Rochester
- Wareham
- West Bridgewater

==== Results ====
1908 Second Plymouth Senate election
Party	Candidate	Votes	%	±%
Republican	Roland M. Keith	6,032	52.39%	
Democratic	Edward Gilmore	4,592	39.89%	
Socialist	Joseph M. Coldwell	889	7.72%	
Total votes		11,513	100.00%	

=== First Suffolk ===
==== Apportionment ====
This district contained the following towns:

- Boston (Ward 1)
- Chelsea
- Revere
- Winthrop

==== Results ====
1908 First Suffolk Senate election
Party	Candidate	Votes	%	±%
Republican	Lewis Burnham	7,224	68.30%	
Democratic	Peter Maguire	3,353	31.70%	
Total votes		10,577	100.00%	

=== Second Suffolk ===
==== Apportionment ====
This district contained Wards 2–5 of Boston and Wards 1-3 of Cambridge.

==== Results ====
1908 Second Suffolk Senate election
Party	Candidate	Votes	%	±%
Democratic	Richard S. Teeling	6,601	65.18%	
Democratic	George F. Monahan (write-in)	1,669	16.48%	
Republican	Henry A.H. Gifford	1,533	15.14%	
Independence	Harry E. Waldstein	325	3.21%	
Total votes		10,128	100.00%	

=== Third Suffolk ===
==== Apportionment ====
This district contained Wards 6–8 of Boston and Ward 4 of Cambridge.

==== Results ====
1908 Third Suffolk Senate election
Party	Candidate	Votes	%	±%
Democratic	Edward W. Dixon	4,545	69.44%	
Republican	Eben S. Johnson	1,711	26.14%	
Independence	Kristian N. Skauen	289	4.42%	
Total votes		6,545	100.00%	

=== Fourth Suffolk ===
==== Apportionment ====
This district contained Wards 9, 12, and 17 of Boston.

==== Results ====
1908 Fourth Suffolk Senate election
Party	Candidate	Votes	%	±%
Democratic	James H. Doyle	4,289	47.42%	
Democratic	Michael J. McEttrick (inc.) (write-in)	2,357	26.06%	
Republican	Charles H. Clark	2,093	23.14%	
Independence	Daniel W. Healy	213	2.35%	
Republican	Chester R. Lawrence (write-in)	93	1.03%	
Total votes		9,045	100.00%	

=== Fifth Suffolk ===
==== Apportionment ====
This district contained Wards 10, 11, and 25 of Boston.

==== Results ====
1908 Fifth Suffolk Senate election
Party	Candidate	Votes	%	±%
Republican	Charles D.B. Fisk	6,922	80.91%	
Independence	William C. Johnson	1,630	26.06%	
Write-in	All others	3	0.03%	{{{change}}}
Total votes		8,555	100.00%	

=== Sixth Suffolk ===
==== Apportionment ====
This district contained Wards 13 through 16 of Boston.

==== Results ====
1908 Sixth Suffolk Senate election
Party	Candidate	Votes	%	±%
Democratic	Patrick H. O'Connor	8,191	69.64%	
Republican	Joseph W. Cullen	2,973	25.23%	
Independence	John T. Dobbyn	394	3.35%	
Socialist	John F. Molloy	203	1.73%	
Write-in	All others	1	0.00%	{{{change}}}
Total votes		11,762	100.00%	

=== Seventh Suffolk ===
==== Apportionment ====
This district contained Wards 18, 19, and 22 of Boston.

==== Results ====
1908 Seventh Suffolk Senate election
Party	Candidate	Votes	%	±%
Democratic	John J. Butler	4,329	40.70%	
Democratic	Timothy F. Murphy (write-in)	3,231	30.38%	
Republican	Israel Mostowitz	2,459	23.12%	
Independence	William P. Sawyer	617	5.80%	
Total votes		10636	100.00%	

=== Eighth Suffolk ===
==== Apportionment ====
This district contained Wards 20 and 21 of Boston.

==== Results ====
1908 Eighth Suffolk Senate election
Party	Candidate	Votes	%	±%
Republican	W. Prentiss Parker	7,091	55.52%	
Democratic	John J. Cummings	4,684	36.67%	
Independence	Washington A. Coles	529	4.14%	
Independent	John A.W. Silver	468	3.66%	
Total votes		12,772	100.00%	

=== Ninth Suffolk ===
==== Apportionment ====
This district contained Wards 23 and 24 of Boston.

==== Results ====
1908 Ninth Suffolk Senate election
Party	Candidate	Votes	%	±%
Republican	Gideon B. Abbott	5,365	54.09%	
Democratic	Michael J. Murray	3,852	38.83%	
Independence	James C. Christian	560	5.65%	
Socialist	Charles F. Claus	140	1.41%	
Write-in	All others	2	3.66%	{{{change}}}
Total votes		9,919	100.00%	

=== First Worcester ===
==== Apportionment ====
This district contained Wards 4 through 10 of Worcester.

==== Results ====
1908 First Worcester Senate election
Party	Candidate	Votes	%	±%
Republican	Elmer C. Potter	7,180	59.11%	
Democratic	Louis B. Glixman	4,967	40.89%	
Total votes		12,147	100.00%	

=== Second Worcester ===
==== Apportionment ====
This district contained the following towns:

- Berlin
- Bolton
- Boylston
- Clinton
- Harvard
- Holden
- Lancaster
- Sterling
- West Boylston
- Worcester (Wards 1–3)

==== Results ====
1908 Second Worcester Senate election
Party	Candidate	Votes	%	±%
Republican	Edward A. Cowee	6,030	99.92%	
Write-in	All others	5	0.08%	{{{change}}}
Total votes		6,035	100.00%	

=== Third Worcester ===
==== Apportionment ====
This district contained the following towns:

- Berlin
- Bolton
- Boylston
- Clinton
- Harvard
- Holden
- Lancaster
- Sterling
- West Boylston
- Worcester (Wards 1–3)

==== Results ====
1908 Third Worcester Senate election
Party	Candidate	Votes	%	±%
Republican	Levi H. Greenwood	6,656	64.60%	
Democratic	Guy H. Chase	2,856	27.72%	
Socialist	James D. Ryan	790	7.67%	
Write-in	All others	1	0.00%	{{{change}}}
Total votes		10,303	100.00%	

=== Fourth Worcester ===
==== Apportionment ====
This district contained the following towns:

- Auburn
- Blackstone
- Douglas
- Grafton
- Hopedale
- Mendon
- Milford
- Millbury
- Northboro
- Northbridge
- Oxford
- Shrewsbury
- Southboro
- Sutton
- Upton
- Uxbridge
- Webster
- Westboro

==== Results ====
1908 Third Worcester Senate election
Party	Candidate	Votes	%	±%
Republican	George F. Birch	5,259	50.40%	
Democratic	John F. Meaney	5,170	49.54%	
Write-in	All others	6	0.06%	{{{change}}}
Total votes		10,435	100.00%	

=== Worcester and Hampden ===
==== Apportionment ====
This district contained the following towns:

- Barre
- Brimfield
- Brookfield
- Charlton
- Dana
- Dudley
- Hampden
- Hardwick
- Holland
- Hubbardston
- Leicester
- Ludlow
- Monson
- New Braintree
- North Brookfield
- Oakham
- Palmer
- Paxton
- Petersham
- Phillipston
- Princeton
- Rutland
- Southbridge
- Spencer
- Sturbridge
- Templeton
- Wales
- Warren
- West Brookfield
- Wilbraham

==== Results ====
1908 Worcester and Hampden Senate election
Party	Candidate	Votes	%	±%
Republican	Arthur D. Norcross	5,986	65.68%	
Democratic	George W. Wheelwright	3,128	34.32%	
Total votes		9,114	100.00%	

== See also ==
- 1909 Massachusetts legislature
- List of former districts of the Massachusetts Senate

== Bibliography ==
- Number of assessed polls, registered voters and persons who voted in each voting precinct in the Commonwealth of Massachusetts at the state, city and town elections. Boston, MA: Office of the Secretary of State. 1908.
