= Thomas P. Riley =

American politician and judge (1875–1928)

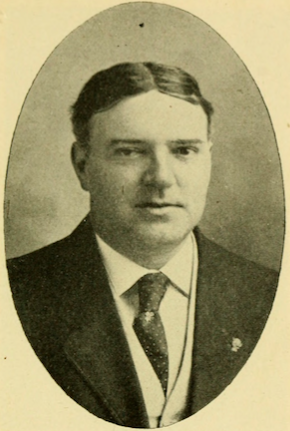

Chairman of the Massachusetts Democratic State Committee
- In office 1912–1914
- Preceded by: John F. McDonald
- Succeeded by: Michael A. O'Leary

Member of the Massachusetts House of Representatives for the 23rd Middlesex district
- In office 1908–1910

Personal details
- Born: July 11, 1875 Medford, Massachusetts, U.S.
- Died: November 26, 1928 (aged 53) Cleveland, Ohio, U.S.
- Party: Democratic
- Education: Seton Hall College; Boston University School of Law

Thomas P. Riley (July 11, 1875 – November 6, 1928) was an American politician and jurist who was a member of the Massachusetts House of Representatives from 1908 to 1910, chairman of the Massachusetts Democratic state committee from 1912 to 1914, and a judge of the Malden District Court from 1911 until his death in 1928.

== Early life ==
Riley was born in Medford, Massachusetts on July 11, 1875. He moved to Malden, Massachusetts when he was five and attended Malden Public Schools and Seton Hall Preparatory School. He earned a Bachelor's and Master of Arts degrees from Seton Hall College Bachelor of Laws and Master of Laws degrees from the Boston University School of Law. He worked as a stenographer before passing the bar in 1901.

== Politics ==
In 1907, Riley won a Massachusetts House of Representatives seat previously held by a Republican. He represented the 23rd Middlesex district in the 1908, 1909, and 1910 Massachusetts legislatures. He was chairman of the Democratic legislative campaign committee in 1910.

Riley was a candidate for Lieutenant Governor of Massachusetts in 1910, but was persuaded to drop out to help end the deadlock over the party's nomination for Governor. He was one of Eugene Foss's chief lieutenants during the 1910 and 1911 gubernatorial elections.

On November 8, 1911, Foss nominated Riley to be a justice on the Malden District Court. He was unanimously confirmed by the Massachusetts Governor's Council. He was known for his unusual sentences, which included ordering an iceman who shorted a customer to provide them with free ice for the remainder of the summer and sentencing a man found guilty of mistreating his horse to sleep two nights in the horse's stall.

On March 16, 1912, Riley was elected chairman of the Massachusetts Democratic state committee. He was reelected on September 29, 1913, by a unanimous vote. Earlier that year, he announced his intention to remain in office until "the day when I shall see the son of an immigrant like myself seated in the Governor's chair". In that year's gubernatorial election, the Democrats succeeded in electing David I. Walsh, a son of Irish Catholic immigrants. At the Democratic State Committee on January 15, 1914, Riley did not stand for reelection and was succeeded by Michael A. O'Leary.

On January 21, 1914, Riley was appointed first assistant attorney general by Massachusetts Attorney General Thomas J. Boynton. Boynton was defeated for reelection that fall which left Riley as a lame duck appointee. He sought the position of United States Marshal for the District of Massachusetts, but lost out to another lame duck office holder, United States Representative John Joseph Mitchell. As consolation for losing these positions, Governor Walsh appointed Riley to the state gas and electric light commission, which paid as much as first assistant attorney general.

Riley was the Democratic nominee for Lieutenant Governor in 1916. He lost to Republican incumbent Calvin Coolidge 283,166 votes to 198,236.

At the 1928 Democratic National Convention, Riley helped swing the New England states to Al Smith. While campaigning for Smith in Cleveland, Riley fell ill with pneumonia. He died suddenly on November 6, 1928. He was survived by his wife, the former Louise Thompson. The couple had wed in 1917, but their marriage was not made public until 1922.

Party political offices
Preceded by Edward P. Barry	Democratic nominee for Lieutenant Governor of Massachusetts; 1916	Succeeded by Matthew Hale
