= 1909 Massachusetts legislature =

130th Massachusetts General Court
←	129th	131st	→

Overview
- Legislative body: General Court
- Election: November 3, 1908

Senate
- Members: 40
- President: Allen T. Treadway
- Party control: Republican (34–6)

House
- Members: 240
- Speaker: Joseph Walker
- Party control: Republican (180–60)

Sessions
- 1st: January 6, 1909 – June 19, 1909

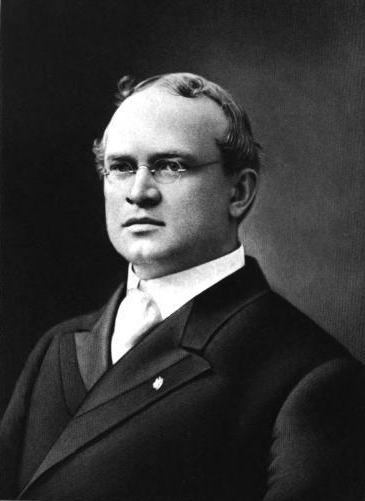
Allen Treadway, Senate president.

Joseph Walker, House speaker.

Leaders of the Massachusetts General Court, 1909.

The 130th Massachusetts General Court, consisting of the Massachusetts Senate and the Massachusetts House of Representatives, met in 1909 during the governorship of Eben Sumner Draper. Allen T. Treadway served as president of the Senate and Joseph Walker served as speaker of the House.

== Senators ==
image	name	date of birth	district
	Gideon B. Abbott		
	George F. Birch		4th Worcester
	Clifford B. Bray		
	George Bunting	August 31, 1868	
	Lewis Burnham		
	John J. Butler		
	Edward A. Cowee		
	J. Howell Crosby		
	William M. Dean	November 16, 1874	
	Francke W. Dickinson		
	Edward W. Dixon		
	James H. Doyle		
	Wilmot R. Evans Jr.		
	Dennis E. Farley	June 12, 1852	
	Charles D. B. Fisk		
	Levi H. Greenwood	December 22, 1872	
	James W. Grimes		
	John L. Harvey	December 5, 1857	
	Joseph H. Hibbard		
	Eugene Hultman	July 13, 1875	
	Roland M. Keith	March 16, 1847	
	Eben S. S. Keith		
	Daniel D. Mahoney		
	Harry P. Morse		
	Henry C. Mulligan		
	Melvin S. Nash	August 3, 1857	
	Arthur D. Norcross	November 7, 1848	
	Patrick H. O'Connor	1882	
	W. Prentiss Parker	December 11, 1857	
	Elmer C. Potter		
	Bradley M. Rockwood		
	Samuel Ross	February 2, 1865	
	William R. Salter		
	James F. Shaw	July 18, 1873	
	Thorndike Spalding		
	Elmer A. Stevens	January 15, 1862	
	Richard S. Teeling		
	Allen T. Treadway	September 16, 1867	
	Joseph Turner		
	William Turtle		

== Representatives ==
image	name	date of birth	district
	Joseph Abbott	May 22, 1874	
	Arthur S. Adams	February 14, 1869	16th Essex
	Scott Adams	March 27, 1874	
	Manuel Andrew	February 10, 1876	
	William M. Armstrong	August 17, 1850	
	Wallace E. W. N. Arnold	June 29, 1863	
	Charles W. Atkins	June 22, 1854	
	William B. Avery	July 11, 1856	
	Erson B. Barlow	October 20, 1883	
	Frank E. Barnard	February 17, 1871	
	Frank L. Barnes	August 20, 1864	
	Charles Homer Barrett	June 23, 1868	
	John J. Barry	January 4, 1877	
	Benjamin Fred Bates	May 3, 1862	
	Edwin A. Bayley	July 30, 1862	
	William A. L. Bazeley	1872	
	James W. Bean	May 11, 1866	
	Elias B. Bishop	August 2, 1869	
	Albert C. Blaisdell	March 30, 1855	
	Charles V. Blanchard	February 2, 1866	
	George F. Bolger		
	Josiah S. Bonney	February 4, 1865	
	J. A. Wilfrid Bouvier	December 27, 1868	
	Israel Brayton		
	Arthur B. Breed	June 30, 1857	
	Bartholomew A. Brickley	May 7, 1883	
	Charles H. Brown	January 19, 1879	
	Alfred J. Burckel	August 7, 1860	
	William R. Burke	July 14, 1870	
	Andrew J. Burnett	1860	
	Alfred S. Burns	February 6, 1860	
	Herbert W. Burr	June 15, 1866	
	George F. Butterick	August 16, 1855	
	Timothy F. Callahan	September 5, 1881	
	Robert B. Campbell	September 28, 1880	
	Zebulon L. Canedy	February 5, 1864	
	James B. Carbrey	January 16, 1854	
	Ignatius J. Carleton	August 7, 1866	
	Cornelius J. Carmody	January 11, 1867	
	Arthur Preston Chase	January 25, 1866	
	Frederick C. Clark		
	Ellenwood B. Coleman	May 31, 1862	
	Francis L. Colpoys		
	Harrison J. Conant		
	Martin F. Conley	April 27, 1870	
	Howard P. Converse		
	Thomas F. Coogan		
	Benjamin A. Cook		
	Frank O. Coombs	December 17, 1857	
	James H. L. Coon		
	John S. Cormack	June 7, 1875	
	Franklin B. Crocker		
	Daniel Joseph Curley	December 23, 1875	
	Frank Curtiss		
	Elmer L. Curtiss	June 11, 1861	
	Grafton D. Cushing	August 4, 1864	
	Alfred L. Cutting	January 27, 1868	
	Francis L. Daly		
	Earl E. Davidson		
	Thomas Davies	February 11, 1875	
	Ralph Davol		
	Henry Ellsworth Dean	September 29, 1862	
	Charles E. Dennett		
	Daniel E. Denny	July 14, 1845	
	Clifford H. Dickson		
	George E. Doane		
	Joseph E. Donovan	April 21, 1882	
	William E. Dorman	June 23, 1875	
	Charles E. Dow		
	Andrew P. Doyle	August 15, 1869	
	Florence J. Driscoll	October 15, 1871	
	Patrick J. Duane	August 18, 1862	
	Horace E. Durgin	December 4, 1863	
	Theodore F. Dwight		
	John F. Dwyer		
	S. Alden Eastman	October 14, 1847	
	Charles E. Ebsen		
	Henry Allen Ellis	November 5, 1879	
	Samuel D. Elmore	December 29, 1868	
	Freeman O. Emerson		
	George C. Fairbanks		
	Thomas J. Fay	April 24, 1879	
	Michael H. Fitzgerald		
	Clarence J. Fogg	July 10, 1853	
	Charles R. Foote	July 9, 1865	
	Nathan B. Foster		
	William F. Garcelon	October 24, 1868	
	Charles M. Gardner		
	Joseph S. Gates	October 3, 1856	
	William H. Gifford	January 20, 1851	
	Edward W. Gleason		
	Jeremiah J. Good		
	Thomas J. Grady	December 16, 1877	
	William J. Graham	October 2, 1873	
	Luther C. Greenleaf		
	Hamlet S. Greenwood	1871	
	Julius Guild	March 30, 1850	
	John W. Haigis	July 31, 1881	
	Homer A. Hall	November 24, 1871	
	James A. Halliday		
	Harry H. Ham		
	Oscar C. Hammarstrom	October 18, 1877	
	Portus B. Hancock	February 19, 1836	
	Bernard F. Hanrahan	July 27, 1875	
	Frank O. Hardy		
	Edward F. Harrington (state representative)	August 10, 1878	
	Melvin Haskell		
	Edward R. Hathaway		
	James A. Hatton		
	John J. Hayes	October 14, 1875	
	William A. Hester		
	Lewis J. Hewitt	February 13, 1870	
	William P. Hickey	November 17, 1871	
	Frederic H. Hilton		
	Ernest E. Hobson	September 29, 1878	
	Frank G. Hodskins	December 26, 1876	
	William M. Hogan	June 2, 1876	
	Henry E. Holbrook	March 21, 1870	
	Joseph W. Holden	October 10, 1867	
	Samuel M. Holman	1862	
	John P. Holmgren		
	Charles T. Holt	August 1, 1845	
	Harry R. Holt		
	Edgar G. Holt		
	Frank A. Hosmer	November 14, 1853	
	William T. Jeffrey	January 23, 1876	
	Timothy J. Keefe		
	Sidney B. Keene	January 10, 1861	
	James H. Kelly	November 14, 1870	
	Frank D. Kemp	June 9, 1862	
	Daniel W. Kendrick		
	Michael J. Kenney	July 12, 1863	
	James W. Killam	July 12, 1874	
	Orvis F. Kinney	May 23, 1880	
	Edwin M. Kittredge	September 27, 1872	
	James H. Knight	October 11, 1876	
	Frederick S. Lane	May 8, 1849	
	Louis F. R. Langelier		
	William F. Learned	January 12, 1850	
	Louis Leland		
	Joseph Leonard		
	J. Henry Leonard	September 18, 1879	
	Charles Lewin		
	Minot J. Lincoln		
	Martin Lomasney	December 3, 1859	
	George E. Lovett	February 27, 1849	
	John A. Lyman	March 13, 1863	
	Jens J. Madsen	October 9, 1869	
	Charles A. Malley	January 22, 1876	
	David Mancovitz	August 15, 1877	
	Charles H. Mansfield	March 20, 1842	
	Matthew McCann	1863	
	Daniel J. McCarthy		
	Charles F. McCarthy	August 15, 1876	
	Frederick T. McClatchey	October 1, 1873	
	Thomas P. McDavitt		
	Philip J. McGonagle	October 21, 1871	
	Andrew McTernen		
	Timothy J. Meade	November 7, 1874	
	John F. Meehan	November 24, 1875	
	Charles C. Mellen		
	James H. Mellen	November 7, 1845	
	Julius Meyers	December 6, 1854	
	Samuel H. Mildram		
	David T. Montague		
	William S. Moore	February 23, 1843	
	Fred Moore	April 4, 1874	
	Leslie K. Morse	January 18, 1860	
	William G. Moseley (Massachusetts politician)	October 31, 1858	
	Arthur L. Nason	October 24, 1872	
	Malcolm Nichols	May 8, 1876	
	William Niedner		
	Albin F. Nordbeck		
	James M. Noyes		
	William H. O'Brien	September 9, 1864	
	J. Frank O'Brien	January 6, 1879	
	James Oliver	June 28, 1836	
	John E. Paige		
	Joseph A. Parks	May 2, 1877	
	Louis E. Pattison	December 30, 1843	
	Thomas Pattison	January 20, 1854	
	Waldo H. Peirce		
	Harry A. Penniman		
	Laurence S. Perry		
	John H. Pickford	September 9, 1849	
	Myron E. Pierce	1874	
	Robert E. Pollock	October 23, 1851	
	Frank H. Pope	March 7, 1854	
	James F. Powers	October 1, 1872	
	Alfred J. Preece		
	Arthur Franklin Priest		
	Frank Elliot Prouty		
	Francis X. Quigley	November 20, 1882	
	Martin Lewis Quinn	January 19, 1862	
	Michael J. Reidy		
	Lyman M. Rice		
	Thomas P. Riley	July 11, 1875	
	William M. Robinson	July 21, 1875	
	John E. Rousmaniere		
	Ralph Sargent	December 5, 1848	
	Harry E. Sargent		
	Amos T. Saunders		
	Michael J. Scully		
	Samuel A. Segee		
	Arthur L. Smith		
	Harry N. Stearns	October 5, 1874	
	Elisha D. Stone		
	George Swann	July 18, 1859	
	Claude H. Tarbox		
	James R. Tetler	August 26, 1877	
	William R. Thomas	September 24, 1871	
	John H. Thompson	August 26, 1873	
	John F. Thompson	May 25, 1866	
	James E. Tolman	November 8, 1867	
	Robb dePeyster Tytus	February 2, 1876	
	Charles L. Underhill	July 20, 1867	
	Alton A. Upton		
	Charles F. Varnum	June 28, 1846	
	Joseph Walker (Massachusetts speaker)	1865	
	Fred F. Walker		
	Joseph A. Wallis	December 12, 1837	
	Thomas S. Walsh	1859	
	Fred P. Warner		
	Clarence A. Warren		
	Robert M. Washburn	January 4, 1868	
	William L. Waugh		
	William E. Weeks	1880	
	Norman H. White	December 25, 1871	
	Augustus L. Whitney	June 19, 1845	
	Walter G. Whittemore		
	George A. Wilder		
	William B. Willcutt	December 14, 1874	
	Isaac E. Willetts	November 8, 1879	
	Thomas P. Wills		
	Roger Wolcott	July 25, 1877	
	Russell A. Wood		
	Ernest W. Woodside		

== See also ==
- 1909 Massachusetts gubernatorial election
- 61st United States Congress
- List of Massachusetts General Courts
