= 1910 Massachusetts legislature =

131st Massachusetts General Court
←	130th	132nd	→

Overview
- Legislative body: General Court
- Election: November 2, 1909

Senate
- Members: 40
- President: Allen T. Treadway
- Party control: Republican (33–7)

House
- Members: 240
- Speaker: Joseph Walker
- Party control: Republican (169–69–2)

Sessions
- 1st: January 5, 1910 – June 15, 1910

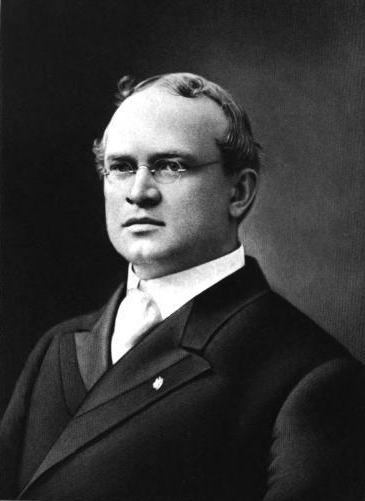
Allen Treadway, Senate president.

Joseph Walker, House speaker.

Leaders of the Massachusetts General Court, 1910.

The 131st Massachusetts General Court, consisting of the Massachusetts Senate and the Massachusetts House of Representatives, met in 1910 during the governorship of Eben Sumner Draper. Allen T. Treadway served as president of the Senate and Joseph Walker served as speaker of the House.

== Senators ==
image	name	date of birth	district
	Gideon B. Abbott		
	Frank P. Bennett Jr.	December 30, 1878	7th Middlesex
	Charles V. Blanchard	February 2, 1866	
	Clifford B. Bray		
	George Bunting	August 31, 1868	
	Lewis Burnham		
	John J. Butler		
	J. Howell Crosby		
	Daniel E. Denny	July 14, 1845	
	James H. Doyle		
	Wilmot R. Evans Jr.		
	Dennis E. Farley	June 12, 1852	
	Levi H. Greenwood	December 22, 1872	
	John L. Harvey	December 5, 1857	
	Joseph H. Hibbard		
	Eugene Hultman	July 13, 1875	
	Roland M. Keith	March 16, 1847	
	Joseph P. Lomasney		
	Daniel D. Mahoney		
	John F. Meaney		
	Walter B. Mellen		
	Henry C. Mulligan		
	Melvin S. Nash	August 3, 1857	
	Arthur L. Nason	October 24, 1872	
	George H. Newhall	October 24, 1850	
	Patrick H. O'Connor	1882	
	W. Prentiss Parker	December 11, 1857	
	John H. Pickford	September 9, 1849	
	John L. Rankin		
	Bradley M. Rockwood	May 24, 1862	
	Samuel Ross	February 2, 1865	
	Thorndike Spalding		
	Richard S. Teeling		
	George H. Tinkham	October 29, 1870	
	James E. Tolman	November 8, 1867	
	Allen T. Treadway	September 16, 1867	
	Joseph Turner		
	William Turtle		
	Thomas S. Walsh	1859	
	John E. White	December 13, 1873	

== Representatives ==
image	name	date of birth	district
	Arthur S. Adams	February 14, 1869	
	David C. Ahearn	November 4, 1879	7th Middlesex
	Raymond C. Allen		
	William M. Armstrong	August 17, 1850	
	Seth Fenelon Arnold	December 21, 1878	
	Alfred Arseneault	January 3, 1869	
	Charles W. Atkins	June 22, 1854	
	William B. Avery	July 11, 1856	
	Erson B. Barlow	October 20, 1883	
	John J. Barry	January 4, 1877	
	Benjamin Fred Bates	May 3, 1862	
	Albert Batley		
	Edwin A. Bayley	July 30, 1862	
	Charles Sumner Beal	August 14, 1856	
	James W. Bean	May 11, 1866	
	George F. Bean		
	William A. Bellamy		
	Alvin E. Bliss		
	Henry Bond		
	William Booth	June 21, 1862	
	Henry E. Bothfeld	March 4, 1859	
	Samuel H. Boutwell		
	Israel Brayton		
	Lincoln Breckenridge		
	Arthur B. Breed	June 30, 1857	
	Francis J. Brennan		
	George A. Brigham		
	Michael J. Brophy		
	Charles H. Brown	January 19, 1879	
	Joseph B. Brown		
	Robert F. Brown	May 4, 1865	
	Alfred J. Burckel	August 7, 1860	
	William R. Burke	July 14, 1870	
	Timothy F. Callahan	September 5, 1881	
	Robert B. Campbell	September 28, 1880	
	Ignatius J. Carleton	August 7, 1866	
	Cornelius J. Carmody	January 11, 1867	
	Charles L. Carr	December 25, 1876	
	John Carr		
	James F. Cavanagh		
	Fred P. Chapman		
	Arthur Preston Chase	January 25, 1866	
	J. Dudley Clark		
	Zebedee E. Cliff	September 23, 1864	
	Samuel F. Coffin	December 27, 1851	
	John Henry Cogswell	July 4, 1875	
	Edward D. Collins	1878	
	Francis L. Colpoys		
	Harrison J. Conant		
	Martin F. Conley	April 27, 1870	
	John J. Conway		
	Leon M. Conwell	April 15, 1870	
	Thomas F. Coogan		
	James H. L. Coon		
	John S. Cormack	June 7, 1875	
	Channing H. Cox	October 28, 1879	
	Samuel V. Crane	October 4, 1855	
	Russell D. Crane		
	Courtenay Crocker	February 4, 1881	
	Daniel Francis Cronin		
	Thomas S. Cuff		
	Harry R. Cumming		
	John B. Cummings		
	John Henry Curtiss		
	Frank Curtiss		
	Grafton D. Cushing	August 4, 1864	
	Alfred W. Cushman		
	Edward D. Cushman		
	Francis L. Daly		
	Thomas Davies	February 11, 1875	
	Arthur S. Davis		
	Parker S. Davis	January 4, 1863	
	Charles A. Dean	March 26, 1856	
	Louis N. M. DesChenes	April 7, 1872	
	Clifford H. Dickson		
	George E. Doane		
	John L. Donovan	June 3, 1876	
	George L. Dow		
	Charles E. Dow		
	Andrew P. Doyle	August 15, 1869	
	Francis M. Ducey		
	Lawrence J. Dugan		
	John F. Dwyer		
	Charles E. Ebsen		
	Charles N. Edgell		
	Henry Allen Ellis	November 5, 1879	
	George H. Ellis	October 3, 1848	
	Charles E. Elwell		
	Freeman O. Emerson		
	Winthrop H. Fairbank	March 13, 1857	13th Middlesex
	Wilton B. Fay		
	William F. Fletcher		
	Clarence J. Fogg	July 10, 1853	
	Fred W. Ford		
	Charles M. Gardner		
	William H. Gifford	January 20, 1851	
	Ellery L. Goff		
	Joseph J. Goode		
	Joseph D. Gowing		
	William J. Graham	October 2, 1873	
	Julius Guild	March 30, 1850	
	John W. Haigis	July 31, 1881	
	Richard Walden Hale	1871	
	Homer A. Hall	November 24, 1871	
	William Halliday		
	James A. Halliday		
	Harry H. Ham		
	Oscar C. Hammarstrom	October 18, 1877	
	Portus B. Hancock	February 19, 1836	
	Leonard F. Hardy		
	Frank O. Hardy		
	Edward F. Harrington (state representative)	August 10, 1878	
	Edward R. Hathaway		
	James A. Hatton		
	John J. Hayes	October 14, 1875	
	Martin Hays	October 14, 1876	
	Michael A. Henebery		
	William A. Hester		
	William P. Hickey	November 17, 1871	
	Clarence Whitman Hobbs Jr.	October 1, 1878	
	Henry E. Holbrook	March 21, 1870	
	Joseph W. Holden	October 10, 1867	
	Samuel M. Holman	1862	
	John P. Holmgren		
	Charles T. Holt	August 1, 1845	
	Harry R. Holt		
	Edgar G. Holt		
	Frank E. Holt		
	William N. Howard		
	John J. Hughes		
	Lyman E. Hurd		
	Maurice Kane		
	John E. Kearns		
	David P. Keefe	September 29, 1855	
	Sidney B. Keene	January 10, 1861	
	James H. Kelly	November 14, 1870	
	Daniel W. Kendrick		
	Charles T. Killpartrick		
	James L. Kimball		
	Orvis F. Kinney	May 23, 1880	
	James H. Knight	October 11, 1876	
	Wilfrid J. Lamoureux	December 13, 1869	
	Louis F. R. Langelier		
	Albert P. Langtry	July 27, 1860	
	Frank H. Lanman		
	Louis Leland		
	J. Henry Leonard	September 18, 1879	
	Charles Lewin		
	Paul I. Lombard		
	Savillion W. Longley		
	David Mancovitz	August 15, 1877	
	George Edward Marchand	December 22, 1877	
	Charles F. McCarthy	August 15, 1876	
	Daniel J. McCarthy		
	Thomas F. McCullough		
	Michael F. McGrath		
	Robert K. McKirdy		
	Timothy J. Meade	November 7, 1874	
	Charles C. Mellen		
	James H. Mellen	November 7, 1845	
	Adin A. Messinger		
	Julius Meyers	December 6, 1854	
	Samuel H. Mildram		
	David T. Montague		
	Charles A. Montgomery		
	William S. Moore	February 23, 1843	
	Charles H. Morrill	October 6, 1874	
	William G. Moseley (Massachusetts politician)	October 31, 1858	
	W. Fred Munroe		
	William J. Murray	October 7, 1885	
	Clarence V. Nickerson		
	Edward T. J. Noonan		
	Albin F. Nordbeck		
	James M. Noyes		
	Michael F. O'Brien	September 18, 1878	
	William H. O'Brien	September 9, 1864	
	Francis D. O'Donnell		
	Dennis A. O'Neil	June 16, 1882	
	James Oliver	June 28, 1836	
	Joseph A. Parks	May 2, 1877	
	Asa L. Pattee		
	William E. Payson		
	Waldo H. Peirce		
	Harry A. Penniman		
	Laurence S. Perry		
	Walter K. Perry		
	Harry L. Pierce		
	Frank H. Pope	March 7, 1854	
	James F. Powers	October 1, 1872	
	Joel L. Powers		
	Arthur Franklin Priest		
	Francis X. Quigley	November 20, 1882	
	Martin Lewis Quinn	January 19, 1862	
	Joseph J. Reed		
	George A. Reed		
	George A. Ricker		
	Thomas P. Riley	July 11, 1875	
	Leonard G. Roberts		
	William M. Robinson	July 21, 1875	
	George B. M. Robinson		
	John E. Rousmaniere		
	Thomas Ryan		
	Ralph Sargent	December 5, 1848	
	Amos T. Saunders		
	Alfred Scigliano		
	Michael J. Scully		
	Samuel A. Segee		
	Benjamin Sharp	1858	
	David B. Shaw		
	Frank H. Smith		
	Theodore L. Sorenson		
	George H. Stevens		
	Arthur M. Stone		
	Elisha D. Stone		
	Arthur D. Story		
	Franklin Sturgis Jr.	October 18, 1883	
	Lynde Sullivan		
	Daniel L. Sullivan	October 16, 1878	
	George Swann	July 18, 1859	
	James R. Tetler	August 26, 1877	
	William R. Thomas	September 24, 1871	
	Nathan A. Tufts	April 15, 1879	
	Robert N. Turner		
	Robb dePeyster Tytus	February 2, 1876	
	Charles L. Underhill	July 20, 1867	
	Alton A. Upton		
	Thomas M. Vinson		
	Joseph Walker (Massachusetts speaker)	1865	
	Clarence A. Warren		
	Robert M. Washburn	January 4, 1868	
	Wickliffe H. Waterhouse		
	William L. Waugh		
	Henry Gordon Wells	October 12, 1879	
	Thomas W. White	January 10, 1876	
	Norman H. White	December 25, 1871	
	Isaac E. Willetts	November 8, 1879	
	Ernest A. Witt		
	Roger Wolcott	July 25, 1877	
	Russell A. Wood		

== See also ==
- 1910 Massachusetts gubernatorial election
- 61st United States Congress
- List of Massachusetts General Courts
