= Governor Foss =

Governor Foss may refer to:

- Eugene Foss (1858–1939), 45th Governor of Massachusetts
- Joe Foss (1915–2003), 20th Governor of South Dakota
