= American Napier (automobile) =

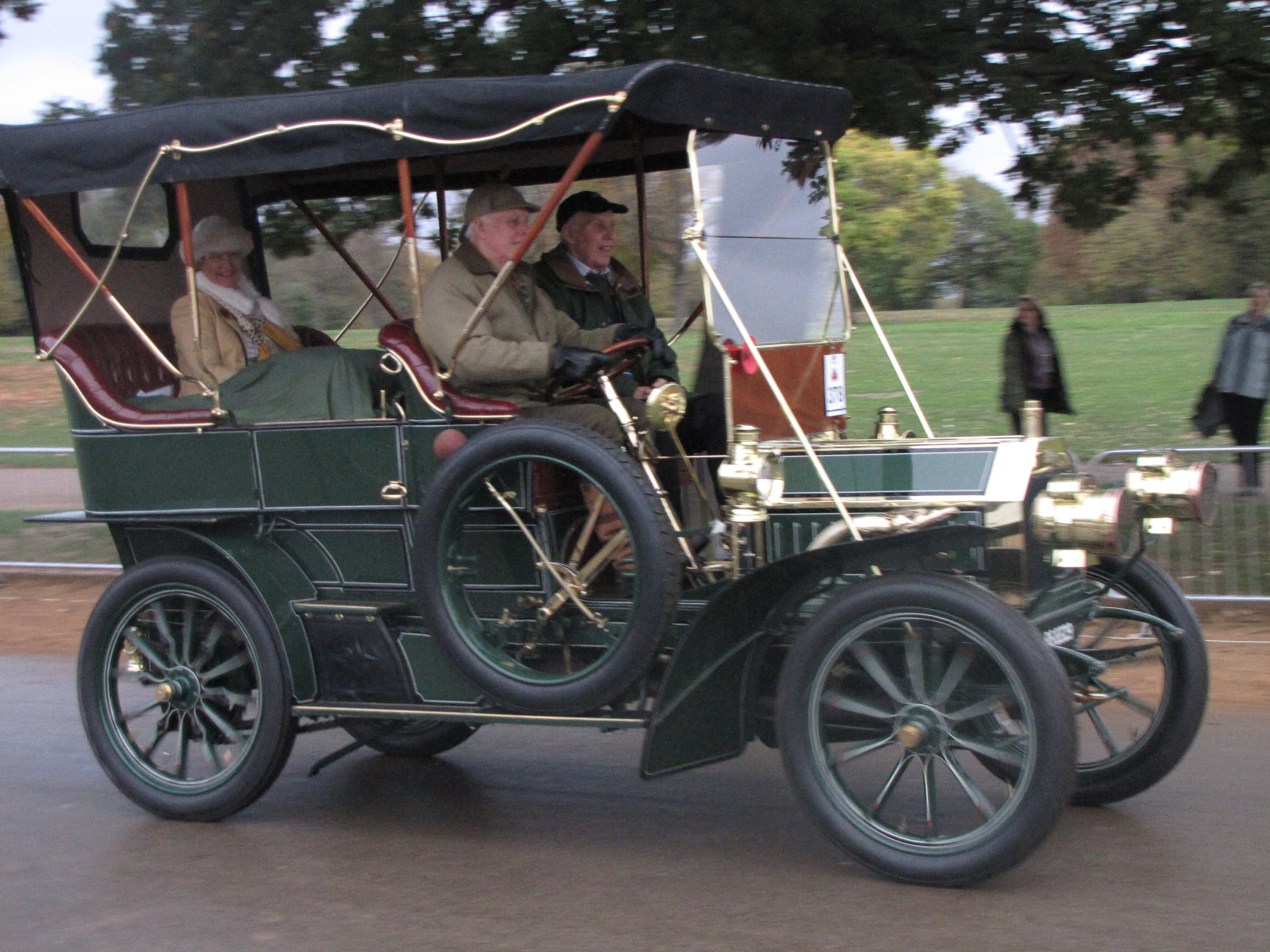
1904 D45/H8 4-cylinder 12 hp tourer 2513 cc 18 bhp @ 1200 rpm entrant 378 London to Brighton run 1 November 2014

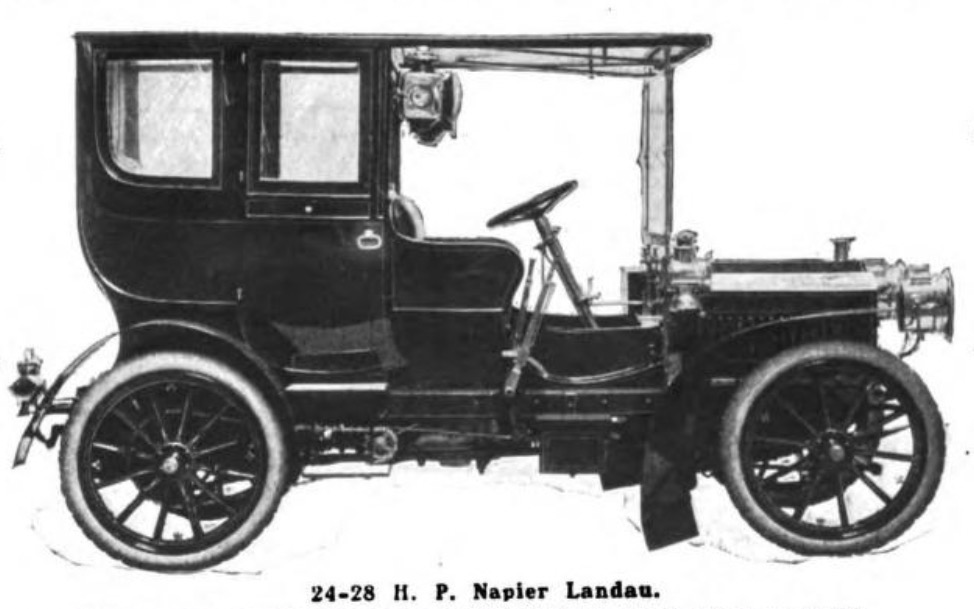
Napier Model H 70 (1904) 24-28 hp

The American Napier was an automobile sold by the Napier Motor Car Company of America from 1904 until 1912.

Initially, the company imported assembled Napiers from England. From late 1904 the cars were assembled under licence in Jamaica Plain, a section of Boston, Massachusetts, in a building formerly used by the B.F. Sturtevant Company. The cars were offered with both American and British built coachwork.

== History ==
In 1907 the company experienced financial problems and production was halted.

In 1909 a new company took over and production restarted in March that year. This lasted until 1911 when the Napier Motor Company took over the interests, but this venture barely lasted a year.

== Advertisements ==
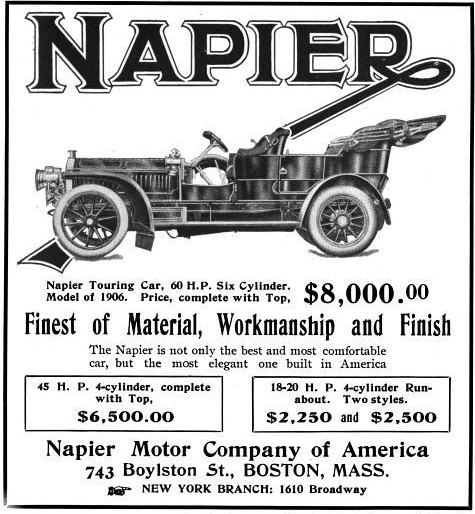
Napier Motor Company of America - 1906.
