= Matthew Hale (Massachusetts politician) =

American lawyer and politician (1882–1925)

- Born: May 30, 1882
- Died: August 29, 1925 (aged 43)
- Occupations: Lawyer, politician, newspaper publisher
- Political party: Progressive; Democratic

Matthew Hale (May 30, 1882 – August 29, 1925) was an American lawyer and politician who was national chairman of the Progressive Party, publisher of The Boston Journal, and the Democratic Party nominee for Lieutenant Governor of Massachusetts in 1917.

== Early life ==
Hale was born on May 30, 1882, in Albany, New York to Matthew and Mary (Lee) Hale. He graduated from The Albany Academy in 1899 and enrolled at Harvard College. He received his Bachelor of Arts degree in 1903 and his Master of Arts in 1904. He entered Harvard Law School in the fall of 1903, but left the following year to work at the White House as a private tutor to Theodore Roosevelt Jr. He returned to Harvard Law in 1905, but left before he earned a degree.

== Legal career ==
Hale began practicing law in 1907 in the offices of Dunbar, Brandeis & Nutter. From 1908 to 1911, he was an assistant solicitor for the Boston and Maine Railroad, working on interstate commerce law. He then entered a partnership with Raymond H. Oveson. In 1912, they were joined by Alexander Kendall to form the firm of Hale, Oveson, & Kendall.

== Politics ==
Hale was a member of the Boston Board of Aldermen from 1908 until it was replaced by the new Boston City Council in 1909. He served on the new city council from 1909 to 1911.

In 1911, Hale helped organize the Progressive Republicans of Massachusetts and was chairman of its executive committee. In June 1912, the group combined with Arthur L. Nason's Militant Progressive League of Massachusetts to form the Progressive Party of Massachusetts. Hale was elected chairman of the new party. He was elected to the Progressive National Committee in 1913 and managed Charles Sumner Bird's campaign in the 1913 Massachusetts gubernatorial election. In June 1914, Hale's heart ruptured due to over exertion. It took him a year to recover. The Progressive state committee sought Hale to be the party's candidate in the 1915 Massachusetts gubernatorial election, but he was unable to run due to his poor health. He endorsed the party's nominee, Nelson B. Clark, but did not play an active role in the campaign.

At the 1916 Progressive National Convention, Hale was chosen to be vice chairman of the Progressive National Committee. After Theodore Roosevelt refused the party's nomination, the national committee voted to endorse the Republican nominee Charles Evans Hughes. Hale opposed this decision and campaigned for the Democratic candidate, Woodrow Wilson. At the 1917 Progressive national convention, the delegates voted to remove the National committee that endorsed Hughes and chose Hale to serve as national chairman. That October, he attended the orgnizational meeting of the National Party, which was formed by pro-war members of the Progressive Party, Socialist Party of America, Single Tax Party, Farmers' Alliance, and independents.

Hale was elected as a delegate-at-large to the Massachusetts Constitutional Convention of 1917–1918 as a member of the Progressive Party.

In 1917, Democratic Party leaders chose Hale to be the party's candidate for Lieutenant Governor. Hale accepted the Democratic nomination, but did not leave the Progressive Party. He appeared on the ballot as the Democratic, Progressive, and Prohibition Party candidate and received 121,426 votes to Republican Calvin Coolidge's 223,157.

During World War I, President Wilson appointed Hale to be one of ten umpires to hear labor cases on which the National War Labor Board could not reach and agreement.

In the 1924 United States presidential election, Hale endorsed Democrat John W. Davis, who he believed to be more progressive than the Republican nominee, Calvin Coolidge. He opposed the nominee of the new Progressive Party, Robert M. La Follette, due to his foreign policy and because he appealed to class and sectional interests rather than the national interest.

== Business interests ==
In March 1913, Hale purchased The Boston Journal from Frank Munsey to promote the interests of the Progressive Party. He left the paper the following year to focus on his work with the Progressive Party. Control of the paper was assumed by a trusteeship consisting of Walton A. Greene, Frederick Enwright, and Hugh Cabot.

Hale and his law partners were involved in real estate development in Boston's West End. They developed the area between the foot of Beacon Hill and the new Charles River Esplanade.

Hale was vice president of the Liberty Shipbuilding Company and managed the government's first concrete shipyard, which was located in Brunswick, Georgia.

In December 1918, Hale was elected president of the South Atlantic Maritime Corporation, which operated steamship lines in the ports of Brunswick, Wilmington, North Carolina, Charleston, South Carolina, Savannah, Georgia, and Jacksonville, Florida. The following year, he became president of the South Atlantic Export Company. The companies were headquartered in Washington, D.C. before moving to New York City. He held both of these positions until his death in 1925.

== Personal life and death ==
On February 23, 1907, Hale married Anne Taggard Piper in Cambridge, Massachusetts. They had five children.

Hale was a member of the Boston City Club and the Union Boat Club. He was a Unitarian.

Hale died from a cerebral embolism on August 29, 1925 in Washington, D.C.

Party political offices
| Preceded by Thomas P. Riley | Democratic nominee for Lieutenant Governor of Massachusetts; 1917 | Succeeded by Joseph H. O'Neil |
| Preceded by Chester R. Lawrence (1915) | Progressive nominee for Lieutenant Governor of Massachusetts; 1917 | Succeeded by Party disbanded |
