= 1911 Massachusetts gubernatorial election =

- November 7, 1911
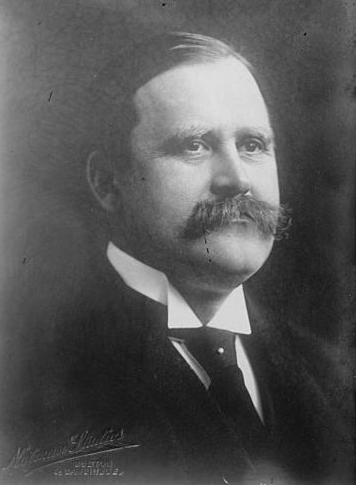

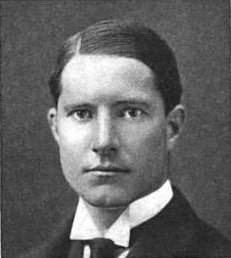
Nominee	Eugene Foss	Louis A. Frothingham
Party	Democratic	Republican
Popular vote	214,897	206,795
Percentage	48.84%	46.99%
- Foss: 40-50% 50–60% 60–70% Frothingham: 40-50% 50–60% 60–70% 70–80% 80–90% >90% Tie: 40-50%
Governor before election
Eugene Foss
Democratic
Elected Governor
Eugene Foss
Democratic

The 1911 Massachusetts gubernatorial election took place on November 7, 1911. Incumbent Democratic Governor Eugene Foss defeated the Republican nominee, Louis A. Frothingham with 48.84% of the vote.

Primary elections were held on September 26, 1911. This was the first gubernatorial election where the nominees were chosen in primary elections.

== Democratic primary ==
=== Candidates ===
- Eugene Foss, incumbent governor
- Thomas L. Hisgen, petroleum producer and the Massachusetts Independence League nominee for governor in 1907

=== Results ===
1911 Massachusetts Democratic gubernatorial primary
Party	Candidate	Votes	%
Democratic	Eugene Foss	60,006	91.66%
Democratic	Thomas L. Hisgen	5,456	8.33%

== Republican primary ==
=== Candidates ===
- Louis A. Frothingham, lieutenant governor of Massachusetts
- Joseph H. Walker, speaker of the Massachusetts House of Representatives
- Norman H. White, state representative from Brookline

=== Results ===
1911 Massachusetts Republican gubernatorial primary
Party	Candidate	Votes	%
Republican	Louis A. Frothingham	59,601	57.33%
Republican	Joseph H. Walker	26,674	25.65%
Republican	Norman H. White	17,677	17.00%

== General election ==
=== Results ===
==== Governor ====
1911 Massachusetts gubernatorial election
Party	Candidate	Votes	%	±%
Democratic	Eugene Foss (incumbent)	172,978	39.31%	
Progressive	Eugene Foss (incumbent)	36,160	8.22%	
Independent	Eugene Foss (incumbent)	5,759	1.31%	
Total	Eugene Foss (incumbent)	214,897	48.84%	▼3.19
Republican	Louis A. Frothingham	206,785	46.99%	▲2.94
Socialist	James F. Carey	13,355	3.04%	▲0.45
Prohibition	Frank N. Rand	3,461	0.79%	▲0.05
Socialist Labor	Dennis McGoff	1,492	0.34%	▼0.25
Write-in	All others	20	0.00%	Steady
Total votes		440,020	100.00%	

==== Lieutenant governor ====
1911 Massachusetts lieutenant gubernatorial election
Party	Candidate	Votes	%	±%
Republican	Robert Luce	204,469	47.72%	▼0.72
Democratic	David I. Walsh	200,318	46.75%	▲0.24
Socialist	Walter S. Hutchins	15,059	3.51%	▲0.81
Prohibition	William G. Merrill	5,534	1.29%	▲0.06
Socialist Labor	Patrick Mulligan	3,123	0.73%	▼0.39
Write-in	All others	6	0.00%	Steady
Total votes		428,503	100.00%	

== See also ==
- 1911 Massachusetts legislature

== Bibliography ==
- Office of the Secretary of the Commonwealth (1912). Election Statistics, 1911. Boston, MA: Wright & Potter Printing Co., State Printers.
