= John W. Heselton =

American politician (1900–1962)

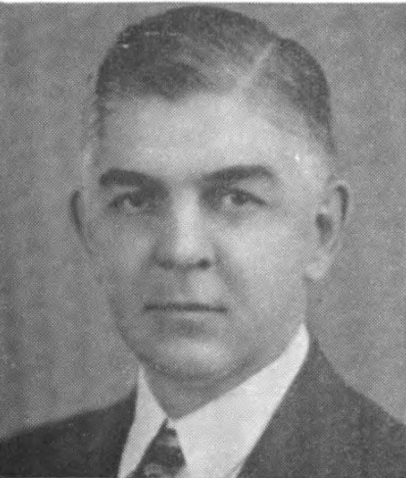
- Heselton, c. 1957

Member of the U.S. House of Representatives from Massachusetts's 1st district
- In office January 3, 1945 – January 3, 1959
- Preceded by: Allen T. Treadway
- Succeeded by: Silvio O. Conte

Personal details
- Born: March 17, 1900 Gardiner, Maine, U.S.
- Died: August 19, 1962 (aged 62) Vero Beach, Florida, U.S.
- Party: Republican
- Spouse: Libbie Sweet (m. 1931)
- Children: 0
- Parents: George W. Heselton (father); Mary E. Stafford (mother)
- Education: Amherst College (BA); Harvard Law School (JD)
- Occupation: Lawyer; politician

Military service
- Allegiance: United States
- Branch: United States Army
- Years of service: 1918
- Rank: private
- Conflict: World War I

John Walter Heselton (March 17, 1900 – August 19, 1962) was a Republican member of the United States House of Representatives from January 3, 1945 until January 3, 1959. Heselton represented Massachusetts' first congressional district for seven consecutive terms.

== Early life ==
Heselton was born in Gardiner, Maine, the son of George W. and Mary E. (née Stafford) Heselton. He joined the United States Army for World War I, but his October 1918 enlistment came shortly before the end of the war, and Heselton was discharged in December. He graduated from Amherst College and Harvard Law School, and practiced law in Greenfield, Massachusetts. He married his wife, Libbie Sweet, a graduate of Simmons College, in 1931.

== Political career ==
Heselton was active in Deerfield town politics, and was president of the Massachusetts Selectmen's Association from 1935 to 1938. He was the district attorney of the northwestern district of Massachusetts from 1939 to 1944.

In 1944 he was elected to Congress, and served until his retirement in 1959. Heselton voted in favor of the Civil Rights Act of 1957.

Heselton retired in Vero Beach, Florida, and died on August 19, 1962, after having considered a political comeback in Florida earlier that year. He is buried at Oak Grove Cemetery in Gardiner, Maine.

U.S. House of Representatives
Preceded by Allen T. Treadway	Member of the U.S. House of Representatives from Massachusetts's 1st congressional district 1945–1959	Succeeded by Silvio O. Conte
