= 1910 Massachusetts gubernatorial election =

- November 8, 1910
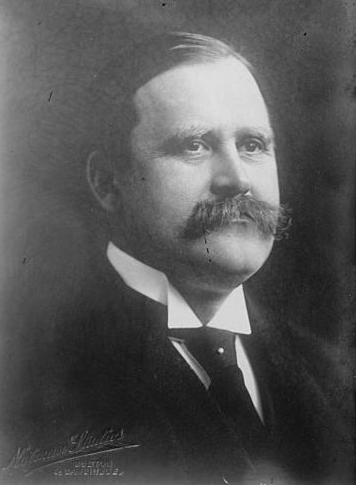

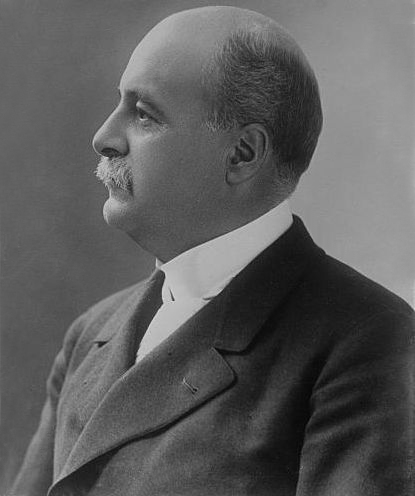
| Nominee | Eugene Foss | Eben S. Draper |
| Party | Democratic | Republican |
| Alliance | Progressive |
| Popular vote | 229,352 | 194,173 |
| Percentage | 52.03% | 44.05% |
- Foss: 40-50% 50–60% 60–70% 70–80% Draper: 40-50% 50–60% 60–70% 70–80% 80–90% >90% Tie: 40-50%
Governor before election
Eben S. Draper
Republican
Elected Governor
Eugene Foss
Democratic

The 1910 Massachusetts gubernatorial election was held on November 8, 1910. Incumbent Republican governor Eben S. Draper was defeated for re-election to a third term by former Republican Eugene Foss, running as a Democrat.

== Republican nomination ==
The Republican convention was held on October 6, 1910 at the Tremont Temple. Incumbent governor Eben S. Draper and the entire Republican ticket were nominated by acclamation.

== Democratic nomination ==
=== Candidates ===
- Eugene Foss, U.S. representative from Jamaica Plain (representing Plymouth, Barnstable, and Bristol Counties)
- Charles S. Hamlin, former assistant secretary of the United States Treasury and candidate for governor in 1902
- James H. Vahey, state senator from Watertown and nominee for governor in 1908 and 1909

=== Convention ===
The Democratic state convention was held on October 6, 1910. On the first ballot, none of the three candidates (Eugene Foss, James H. Vahey, Charles S. Hamlin) received enough votes to win the nomination. Realizing that he could not win, Hamlin’s managers attempted to move their delegates to Vahey. However, Foss' managers were able to gather a large number of Hamlin delegates. On the second ballot, Foss led Vahey 438 votes to 425, 6 votes short of the 444 needed to win the nomination. Hopelessly deadlocked, the convention authorized a committee consisting of Fred J. Macleod (chairman), Joseph A. Maynard, William P. Hayes, and Robert J. Crowley to select the party’s nominees for governor and lieutenant governor. American Federation of Labor counsel Frederick Mansfield was chosen as a placeholder candidate and would be the party’s nominee for governor if the committee could not choose a candidate by the filing deadline. This committee too was unable to select a candidate, as Crowley and Hayes supported Hamlin and Macleod and Maynard supported Foss. The committee was also unsuccessful in electing a fifth member to break the tie. On October 12, the Democratic state committee voted to canvass convention delegates by mail. Before the canvassing, Vahey asked that none of the delegates vote for him and instead vote for Hamlin. However, if Foss were nominated, Vahey said he would support him. On October 17, Foss was declared the nominee. He received 495 votes - the exact amount needed to win - to Hamlin's 484 in the mail canvass.

Gubernatorial ballot
| | 1st | 2nd | Mail |
| Needed for nomination | 496 | 444 | 495 |
| Eugene Foss | 383 | 438 | 495 |
| Charles S. Hamlin | 295 | 20 | 484 |
| James H. Vahey | 302 | 425 | 3 |
| Other | 11 | 3 | 4 |

== General election ==
=== Results ===
1910 Massachusetts gubernatorial election
| Party | Candidate | Votes | % | ±% |
|---|---|---|---|---|
| Democratic | Eugene Foss | 207,647 | 47.10% | ▲0.48 |
| Progressive | Eugene Foss | 14,052 | 3.19% | N/A |
| Independent | Eugene Foss | 7,653 | 1.74% | N/A |
| Total | Eugene Foss | 229,352 | 52.03% | N/A |
| Republican | Eben S. Draper (incumbent) | 194,173 | 44.05% | ▼4.59 |
| Socialist | Daniel A. White | 11,396 | 2.59% | |
| Prohibition | John A. Nicholls | 3,277 | 0.74% | ▼0.65 |
| Socialist Labor | Moritz E. Ruther | 2,613 | 0.59% | ▼0.18 |
| Write-in | Others | 20 | 0.01% | ▲0.01 |

== See also ==
- 1910 Massachusetts legislature
