= Joseph Walker (Massachusetts speaker) =

American politician (1865–1941)

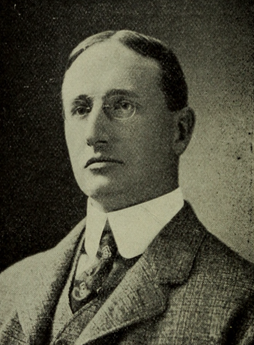
- Walker c. 1909

Speaker of the Massachusetts House of Representatives
- In office 1909–1911
- Preceded by: John N. Cole
- Succeeded by: Grafton D. Cushing

Member of the Massachusetts House of Representatives for the 2nd Norfolk District
- In office 1904–1911
- Preceded by: Benjamin C. Dean
- Succeeded by: John H. Sherburne / John A. Curtin

Personal details
- Born: July 13, 1865 Worcester, Massachusetts, U.S.
- Died: November 26, 1941 (aged 76) Boston, Massachusetts, U.S.
- Party: Republican
- Profession: Lawyer

Joseph Walker (July 13, 1865 – November 26, 1941) was a U.S. lawyer and politician who served as the Speaker of the Massachusetts House of Representatives from 1909 to 1911.

== Early life ==
Walker was born on July 13, 1865, in Worcester, Massachusetts, to Joseph H. Walker and Hannah M. (Kelly) Walker. His father was a member of the United States House of Representatives from 1889 to 1899.

Walker earned degrees from Phillips Exeter Academy, Brown University, Harvard College, and Harvard Law School. He was admitted to the Suffolk County bar in 1889.

== Politics ==
Walker was a member of the Brookline School Committee from 1897 to 1903. He also served on the Town Committee and was a Republican State Committeeman. In 1903, he was appointed to the state board of charity by Governor John L. Bates.

In 1904, Walker was elected to the Massachusetts House of Representatives. He served as chairman of the House Rules, Ways, and Means Committee, the special State Accounts Committee, and the Railroads Committee. In 1909 he was elected Speaker of the House.

Walker was a candidate for Governor of Massachusetts in 1911, but lost the Republican nomination to Lieutenant Governor Louis A. Frothingham. He ran again in 1912, but lost in the general election to Governor Eugene Foss. He ran a third time in 1914 as a member of the Progressive Party. He finished in third place with 7.02% of the vote.

== Death ==
Walker died on November 26, 1941, at the Phillips House of the Massachusetts General Hospital.

== See also ==
- 130th Massachusetts General Court (1909)
- 131st Massachusetts General Court (1910)

Party political offices
Preceded by Louis A. Frothingham	Republican nominee for Governor of Massachusetts; 1912	Succeeded by Augustus Peabody Gardner
Preceded by Charles Sumner Bird	Progressive nominee for Governor of Massachusetts; 1914	Succeeded by Nelson B. Clark
Massachusetts House of Representatives
Preceded by John N. Cole	Speaker of the Massachusetts House of Representatives; 1909 — 1911	Succeeded by Grafton D. Cushing
