= B. F. Sturtevant Company =

B. F. Sturtevant Co.
- Industry: HVAC
- Founded: 1860; 166 years ago in Boston, Massachusetts, United States
- Founder: B. F. Sturtevant
- Defunct: 1989
- Headquarters: Boston, Massachusetts, USA
- Area served: Worldwide

The B. F. Sturtevant Company was a Boston-based manufacturer of fans. It became a leader in the manufacture of industrial air cooling and ventilation systems.

== Origins ==
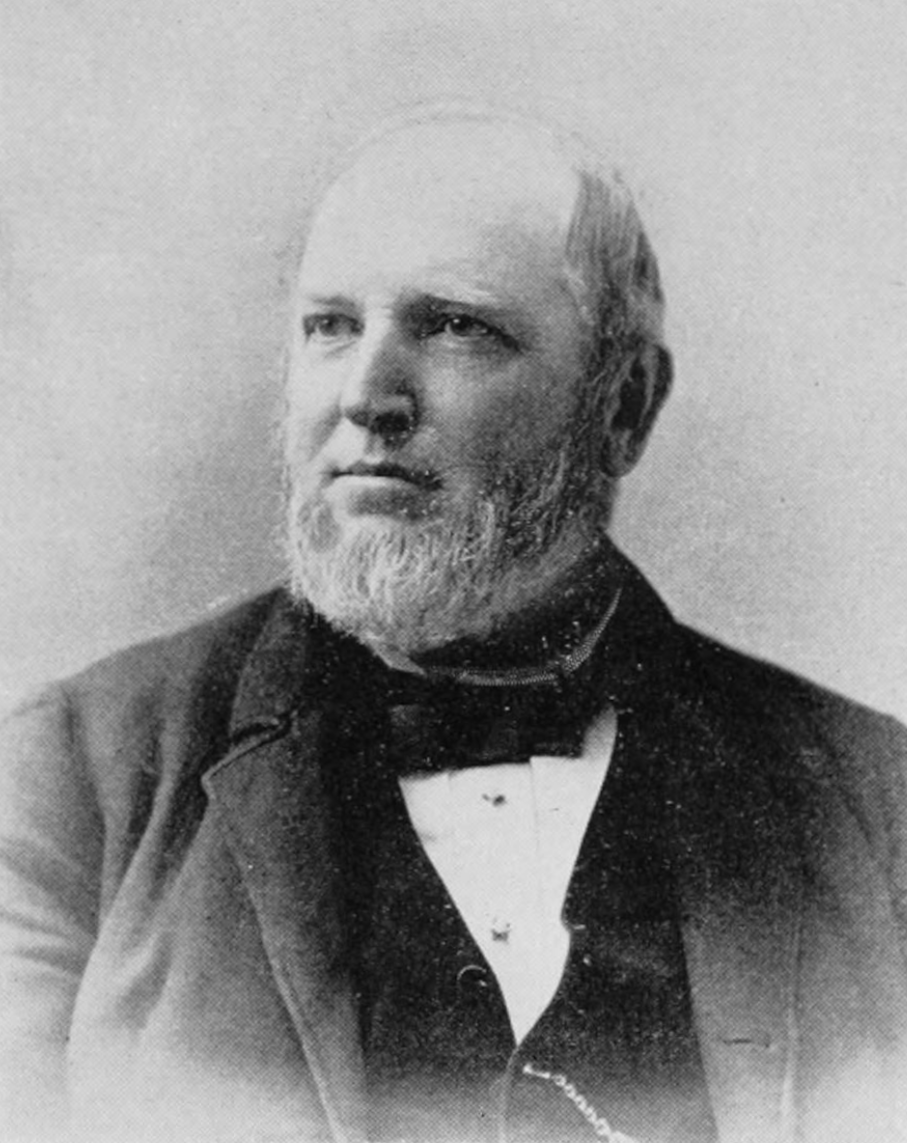
B. F. Sturtevant

The company was founded in 1860 in Boston by inventor Benjamin Franklin Sturtevant (1833–1890); the plant was located near the present Government Center area. The company at first manufactured wooden pegs used in shoemaking. The process created much sawdust, and Sturtevant invented a mechanical fan that was effective at keeping the work area sawdust-free. By 1864 Sturtevant was manufacturing the first commercially successful blower, and by 1866 the company employed 50 workers and worked exclusively on making fans.

In 1869 the company introduced the "Sturtevant system," still the basis for much interior heating of buildings. Sturtevant adapted hot blast technology for indoor heating, using ductwork to spread the warmed air.

In 1876 the company moved its plant to the Jamaica Plain neighborhood of Boston, and soon began work with the United States Navy. In 1878, B. F. Sturtevant Company was America's first major fan manufacturer, with its Jamaica Plain facility, the largest fan manufacturing plant in the world, producing up to 5,000 blowers annually, employing about 400 workers. In 1879, Sturtevant introduced a system for ventilating the hulls of ships. In 1879, Sturtevant supplied the USS Alliance with mechanical draft fans that improved fuel efficiency so much that Navy ships were able to retire their back-up sail systems.

== Growth ==
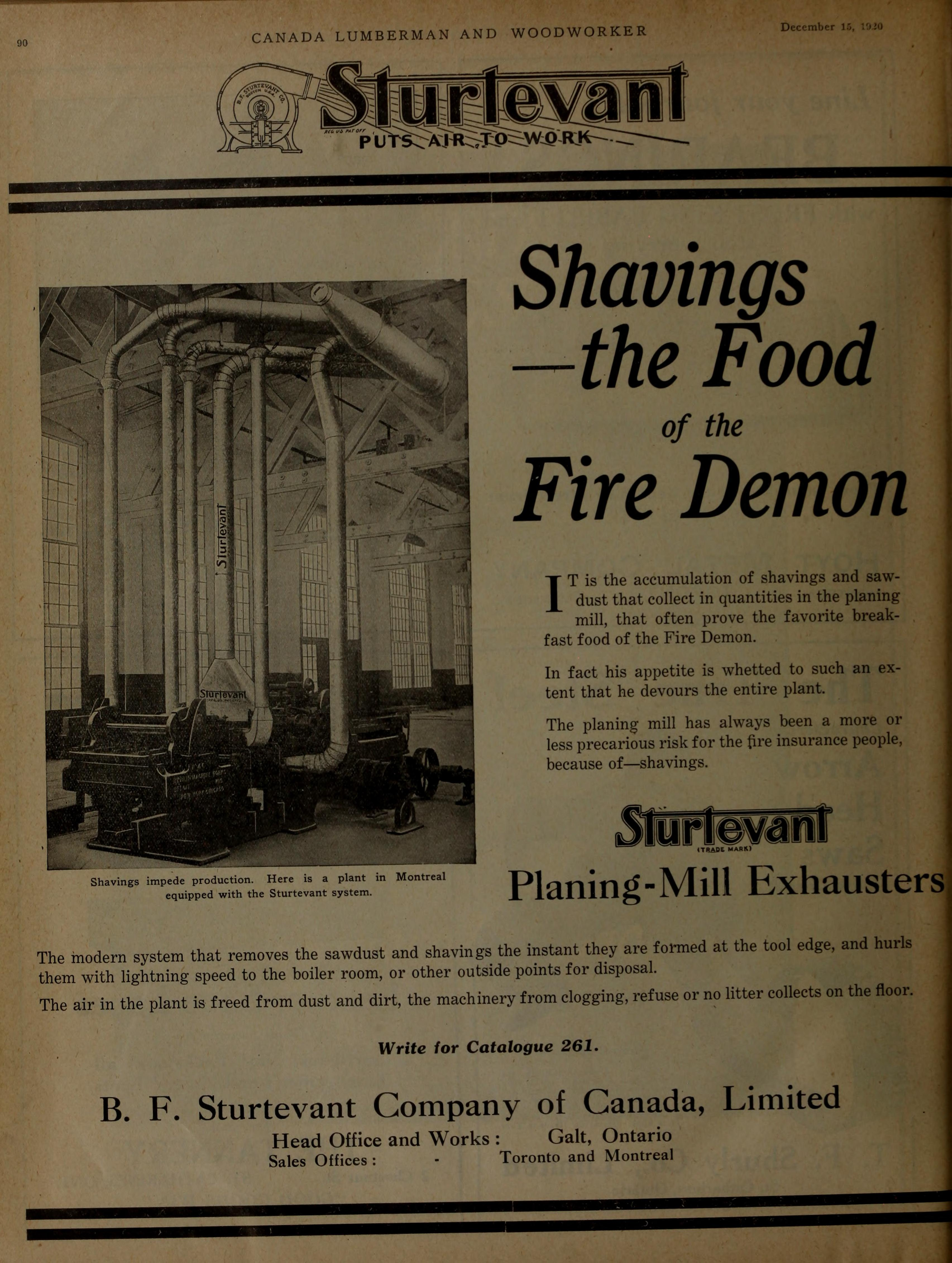
A Sturtevant Company ventilation system installed at a Montreal lumber planing mill, c. 1920

Sturtevant died in 1890 and his son-in-law, Eugene Foss, took over the business. After a 1901 fire, the plant was moved to Hyde Park, Massachusetts, in 1903, into a new ten-building, 20-acre (8.1 ha) facility designed by Lockwood, Greene & Co. It was now the world's largest manufacturer of electrical fans. The company had expanded into industrial ventilation, heating, air conditioning, dust and fume removal, power, drying and vacuum cleaning. In 1906, Sturtevant installed the first industrial air conditioning system at Walter Baker & Company in Dorchester, and, at a Chicago hotel in 1910, the first residential air conditioning system. Beginning In 1911, Sturtevant Manufacturing Co, produced several aircraft engines, before being absorbed by the B. F. Sturtevant Company. They opened a factory in Galt, Ontario in 1913.

Foss left the company in 1909 to run for Governor of Massachusetts, for which he served three one-year terms. By 1917, Foss's personal money problems threatened the company, which was put into receivership with the rest of his assets. The company survived and, flush with World War I contracts, flourished. In 1919 Sturtevant opened a factory in Framingham, followed by one in Camden, New Jersey, in 1922, and Berkeley, California, in 1923. Sturtevant, Wisconsin, was named for the factory works opened there in 1923.

Sturtevant introduced its highly efficient backward-curved Silentvane fans in 1922, which would be used in the ventilation of the Holland Tunnel. Its Inlet Vane Control system, introduced in 1927, adjusted to load requirements, allowing simpler motors and reducing power consumption. In World War II, almost every new United States fighting ship was built with Sturtevant ventilation.

== Decline ==
In 1945, near the end World War II, Sturtevant was taken over by Westinghouse Electric Corporation. The new owners reconstructed and modernized the Hyde Park facilities in 1946, but in 1954 Westinghouse moved the air conditioning business to Virginia, and Sturtevant Boston returned to its roots as an industrial fan manufacturer. The flue gas cleaning business was sold to Peabody International Corporation, becoming a new subsidiary, Sturtevant Gas Cleaning Ltd. while the blower division became Peabody Fans. In 1985, as Peabody started its divestment program, Sturtevant was sold to the South Africa-based American-Davidson, which quickly sold the industrial fan line to Oklahoma-based Acme Engineering & Manufacturing. The international boycotts of South Africa affected American-Davidson, which closed what was left of Sturtevant in 1989.
