= George H. Tinkham =

American politician (1870–1956)

George Holden Tinkham
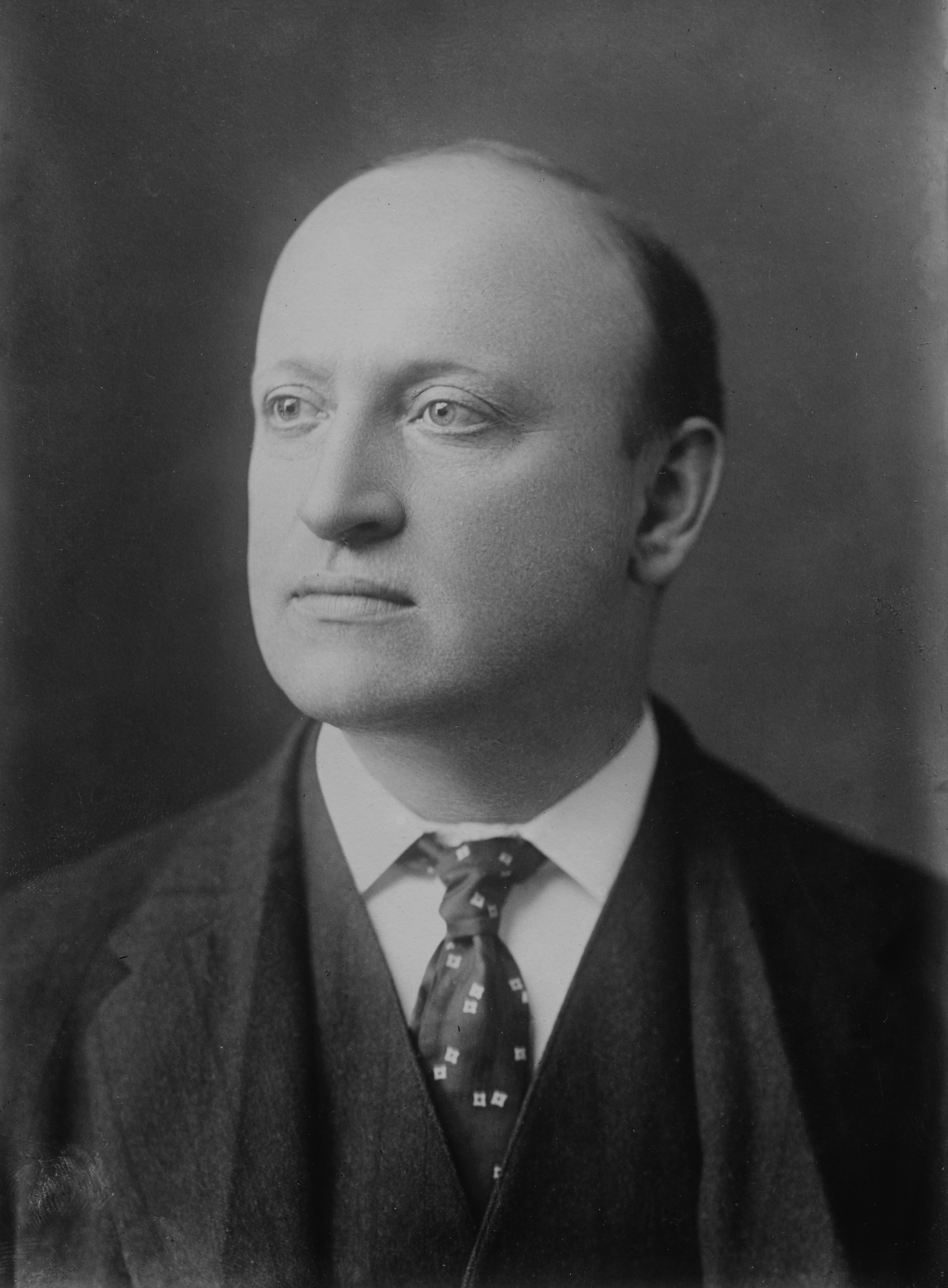
- Tinkham circa 1918

Member of the U.S. House of Representatives from Massachusetts
- In office March 4, 1915 – January 3, 1943
- Preceded by: Andrew James Peters
- Succeeded by: Christian Herter
- Constituency: 11th district (1915–1933); 10th district (1933–1943)

Member of the Massachusetts State Senate
- In office 1910–1912

Boston Alderman
- In office 1900–1902

Member of the Boston Common Council
- In office 1897–1898

Personal details
- Born: October 29, 1870 Boston, Massachusetts, U.S.
- Died: August 28, 1956 (aged 85) Cramerton, North Carolina, U.S.
- Resting place: Forest Hills Cemetery, Boston, Massachusetts
- Party: Republican
- Education: Harvard University
- Profession: Attorney

Military service
- Battles/wars: World War I

George Holden Tinkham (October 29, 1870 – August 28, 1956) was a member of the United States House of Representatives from the state of Massachusetts.

== Early years ==
Tinkham was born October 29, 1870, in Boston, Massachusetts, to Frances Ann Holden and George Henry Tinkham, a produce dealer. He graduated from Harvard College in 1894.

== Career ==
Tinkham served as a member of the Boston Common Council in 1897 and 1898. After this first venture into politics he resumed his education at Harvard Law School. He was admitted to the bar in 1899 and commenced practice in Boston. Tinkham returned to public office, serving as a member of the Boston Board of Aldermen from 1900 to 1902. (Note: The Boston Common Council and the Boston Board of Aldermen were later combined into the Boston City Council, following a rewrite of Boston's city charter.)

Tinkham spent the next several years working as a lawyer. In 1910 he returned to public service, being elected as a member of the Massachusetts State Senate, where he served from 1910 to 1912.

During World War I, he served in the military; Tinkham would later tell Life magazine that while touring the front as a Congressman he fired the first American shot against the Austrians.

Tinkham was elected as a Republican to the Sixty-fourth Congress and to the thirteen succeeding Congresses (March 4, 1915 – January 3, 1943). During that time Tinkham was nicknamed "the conscience of the House" for his efforts to protect voting rights for African Americans, in part by highlighting of the South's disproportionate representation in the House related to that region's voting population. In 1937, a California newspaper reported "Representative Tinkham of Massachusetts, on the other hand, is emphatic in the view that we are heading for an alliance with England, France and Russia against Germany, Italy and Japan and he favors playing a lone hand and attending strictly to our own business".

Tinkham did not stand for renomination in 1942. He continued to practice law in Boston until his retirement; died in Cramerton, North Carolina, on August 28, 1956; interment in Forest Hills Cemetery in Boston.

In his spare time, he went on safaris in Kenya.

== See also ==
- 131st Massachusetts General Court (1910)

== Notes ==
U.S. House of Representatives
Preceded by Andrew J. Peters	Member of the U.S. House of Representatives from Massachusetts's 11th congressional district March 4, 1915 – March 3, 1933	Succeeded by John J. Douglass
Preceded by John J. Douglass	Member of the U.S. House of Representatives from Massachusetts's 10th congressional district March 4, 1933 – January 3, 1943	Succeeded by Christian Herter
Political offices
Preceded by	Member of the Boston, Massachusetts; Common Council; 1897–1898	Succeeded by
Preceded by	Member of the Boston, Massachusetts; Board of Aldermen; 1900 – 1902	Succeeded by
Preceded by	Member of the Massachusetts State Senate; 1910 – 1912	Succeeded by
