= Bradley M. Rockwood =

American politician

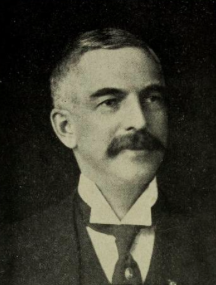
Bradley M. Rockwood

Bradley M. Rockwood served in the Massachusetts Senate. He was from Franklin, Massachusetts.

== See also ==
- 131st Massachusetts General Court (1910)
