= Allen T. Treadway =

American politician (1867–1947)

Allen Towner Treadway
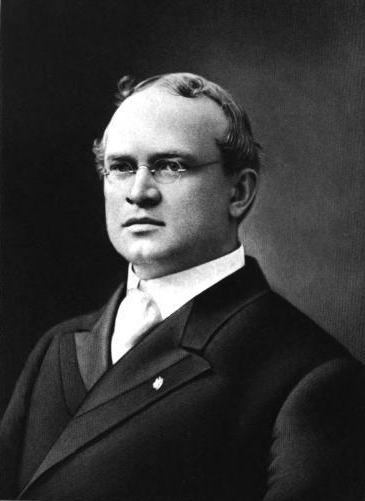
- Treadway, c. 1913

Member of the U.S. House of Representatives from Massachusetts's 1st district
- In office March 4, 1913 – January 3, 1945
- Preceded by: George P. Lawrence
- Succeeded by: John W. Heselton

President of the Massachusetts State Senate
- In office January, 1909 – January, 1911

Member of the Massachusetts Senate
- In office 1908–1911

Member of the Massachusetts House of Representatives
- In office 1904

Personal details
- Born: September 16, 1867 Stockbridge, Massachusetts, US
- Died: February 16, 1947 (aged 79) Washington, D.C., US
- Party: Republican
- Spouse: Sylvia S. Shares
- Children: Heaton Ives, Charles Denton Treadway

Allen Towner Treadway (September 16, 1867 – February 16, 1947) was a Massachusetts Republican politician.

== Biography ==
Treadway was born on September 16, 1867, in Stockbridge, Massachusetts, to William Denton Treadway and Harriet (Heaton) Treadway. He graduated from Amherst College in 1886. Treadway served in the Massachusetts House of Representatives in 1904, and in the Massachusetts Senate from 1908 to 1911; he served as Senate president from 1909 to 1911. From March 4, 1913, until January 3, 1945, he was a member of the United States House of Representatives. Treadway represented Massachusetts' 1st congressional district for sixteen consecutive terms.

He died on February 16, 1947, aged 79, in Washington, D.C., and is buried in Stockbridge Cemetery, in his home town of Stockbridge.

== Legacy ==
Treadway once owned the Red Lion Inn in Stockbridge, the Inn has a room named for him.

== See also ==
- 130th Massachusetts General Court (1909)
- 131st Massachusetts General Court (1910)

== Notes ==
U.S. House of Representatives
Preceded by George P. Lawrence	Member of the U.S. House of Representatives from Massachusetts's 1st congressional district 1913— 1945	Succeeded by John W. Heselton
Political offices
Preceded by William D. Chapple	President of the Massachusetts Senate; January, 1909— January, 1911	Succeeded by Levi H. Greenwood
