= David Mancovitz =

American politician

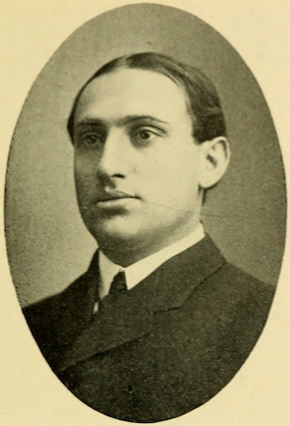
David Mancovitz portrait

David Mancovitz (August 15, 1877 – June 25, 1936) was an American attorney and politician from Boston, Massachusetts.

== Early life ==
Mancovitz was born on August 15, 1877, in Province of Posen, Prussia (now Poland). He came to the United States at the age of seven. He was educated in Boston public schools and graduated from The English High School and Boston University School of Law.

== Political career ==
Mancovitz was a politician from Boston's Ward Eight and a protégé of Martin Lomasney. From 1903 to 1905, he was a member of the Boston Common Council. He then served in the Massachusetts House of Representatives from 1907 to 1910 and in 1916. He was a candidate for reelection in 1916, but withdrew in favor of Lomasney.

During his political career, Mancovitz gained a reputation as one of the most clever speakers from Lomasney's Hendricks Club.

== Conspiracy charges ==
On December 1, 1913, Mancovitz was indicted by a federal grand jury on charges of conspiracy, receiving money with a view to defeat the bankruptcy law, and perjury. According to the indictments, Mancovitz conspired with Jacob Watchmaker, a legal client and cousin, to conceal $33,116 in cash and a mortgage worth $8,000 from the trustee of Watchmaker's bankruptcy estate. Mancovitz's wife and father-in-law were also indicted in the case. He pleaded not guilty and was released on $2,500 bail.

United States Attorney Asa P. French wanted to consolidate three of the charges, but his motion was denied by Judge James Madison Morton, Jr. On March 19, 1914, Mancovitz went on trial for receiving money with a view to defeat an act related to bankruptcy. Prior to the trial, Watchmaker pleaded guilty to the conspiracy charges and became a witness in the government's case against Mancovitz. Mancovitz contended that the only money of Watchmaker's that he had was $17,116 that he had found in Watchmaker's attic and that he was going to use this money to pay off Watchmaker's creditors. A number of character witnesses testified on Mancovitz's behalf, including former Speaker of the Massachusetts House of Representatives John N. Cole, Surveyor for the Port of Boston Joseph A. Maynard, state senator John H. Mack, and former state legislators Simon Swig and Charles I. Quirk. The trial ended on April 2, 1914. After having deliberated all night, the jury was unable to come to a decision and the judge declared a mistrial.

On October 14, 1914, two days before French was to leave office, he endorsed a Nolle prosequi upon the four indictments against Mancovitz.

== Legal career and death ==
After his political career, Mancovitz served as an assistant district attorney under Suffolk County District Attorney Joseph C. Pelletier. He then ran his own law practice. In 1933, Mancovitz fought off an armed robber who entered his car while it was stopped at a traffic light. On June 25, 1936, Mancovitz was found dead in his office at the Carney Building on Tremont Street in Boston. His death was due to natural causes.

== See also ==
- 1916 Massachusetts legislature
