= Leon M. Conwell =

American journalist and politician (1870-1953)

Leon Martin Conwell
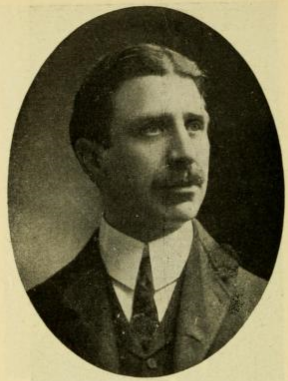

19th Mayor of Somerville, Massachusetts
- In office January 4, 1926 – January 6, 1930
- Preceded by: John M. Webster
- Succeeded by: John J. Murphy

Member of the Massachusetts House of Representatives 26th Middlesex District
- In office 1910–1912

Member of the Somerville, Massachusetts School Board
- In office 1907–1908

Personal details
- Born: April 15, 1870 Somerville, Massachusetts
- Died: August 18, 1953 (aged 83) Somerville, Massachusetts
- Party: Republican
- Spouse(s): Sarah Harriet Brewster, m. June 19, 1901.
- Children: Agnes Conwell; Charles Brewster Conwell
- Education: Rugby Academy, Philadelphia; Princeton University, A.B. class, of 1892.
- Profession: Journalist

Leon Martin Conwell (April 15, 1870 – August 18, 1953) was an American journalist and politician who served in the Massachusetts House of Representatives and as the nineteenth Mayor, of Somerville, Massachusetts.

Conwell was born April 15, 1870, in Somerville, Massachusetts to Jennie P. (Hayden) Conwell, and Russell H. Conwell.

Conwell was the publisher and editor of the Somerville Journal.

== Notes ==
Political offices
Preceded by John M. Webster	19th Mayor of Somerville, Massachusetts; January 4, 1926 – January 6, 1930	Succeeded by John J. Murphy
