= Norman H. White =

American politician

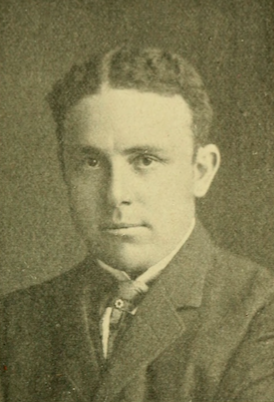

Chairman of the Massachusetts Economy and Efficiency Board
- In office 1912–1913
- Preceded by: Position created
- Succeeded by: John N. Cole

Member of the Massachusetts House of Representatives for the 2nd Norfolk District
- In office 1907–1911
- Preceded by: Seat created
- Succeeded by: John H. Sherburne / John A. Curtin

Personal details
- Born: December 25, 1871 Montclair, New Jersey, US
- Died: May 5, 1951 (aged 79) Cambridge, Massachusetts, US
- Resting place: Mount Auburn Cemetery
- Party: Republican (1907–1912); Progressive Party (1912–1913)
- Spouse: Gertrude Steese (1896–1951; his death)
- Relations: Joshua Crane (uncle)
- Education: Harvard College
- Occupation: Publisher

Norman Hill White (December 25, 1871 – May 5, 1951) was an American publisher and politician.

== Early life and business career ==
White was born on December 25, 1871, in Montclair, New Jersey to Henry and Henrietta Hill White. His mother was the daughter of William H. Hill, one of Boston's leading citizens.

White graduated from Harvard College in 1895 and soon thereafter became the treasurer of the Boston Bookbinding Company. He was also the assignee Small, Maynard & Company, a director of the Brookline National Bank, and a director of the Brookline Friendly Society. In 1896 he married Gerturde Steese. In 1909, White was charged with manslaughter after he struck a seven-year-old boy with his automobile in Worcester, Massachusetts. His case was brought before a grand jury, which chose not to indict him.

== Politics ==
White represented Brookline, Massachusetts in the Massachusetts House of Representatives from 1907 to 1911. In 1909 he was chairman of the house education committee and in 1910 and 1911 was chairman of the ways and means committee. He was also the secretary of the Savings Bank Insurance League and worked to pass Louis Brandeis' proposed legislation that permitted savings banks to underwrite life insurance policies. He also worked with Brandeis to oppose the merger of the New Haven and Boston and Maine Railroads. In 1908, White was the only Republican to voice opposition to the renomination of John N. Cole as Speaker. He broke with the party again in 1909, campaigning for independent candidate John E. White over Republican nominee Thomas Pattison in the race for the Cape District's Massachusetts Senate seat. In 1911 he led an unsuccessful effort to prohibit the exhibition of un-draped statues or pictures of the naked human form. In the 1911 gubernatorial election, White finished third in the Republican primary with 17% of the vote. During the campaign, a dark-tinted lithograph released by White's campaign led to rumors that he was of African descent. In the 1912 United States presidential election, White backed Theodore Roosevelt for president and joined the Bull Moose Party. On November 13, 1912, Democratic Governor Eugene Foss nominated White for chairman of the newly-formed state economy and efficiency board. He was unanimously confirmed by the Massachusetts Governor's Council on November 20, 1912. On March 15, 1913, White resigned from the economy and efficiency board to run in the special election for the Massachusetts's 13th congressional district that became vacant when John W. Weeks was elected to the United States Senate. The nominee of the Progressive Party, White finished third with 20% of the vote to Democrat John Joseph Mitchell's 48% and Republican Alfred L. Cutting's 32%.

== Military intelligence work ==
During World War I, White was a United States Secret Service agent connected with the military intelligence sector. In 1918 he testified before the United States Senate Committee on Military Affairs in favor of a bill that would have spies, propagandists, and saboteurs arrested in the United States tried by a military tribunal instead of civil court. In 1920, Small, Maynard & Company published the first American edition of The Protocols of the Elders of Zion. It is unknown what role White, an ally of the first Jewish justice of the United Supreme Court Louis Brandeis, had in its publication, however he may have been exposed to Jewish Bolshevism propaganda during his time in military intelligence.

== Bankruptcy and criminal charges ==
In 1927, and the Boston Bookbinding Company and Small, Maynard & Company, both wholly owned by White, filed for bankruptcy. As a result, the Waldo Trust Company, which was half owned by White and held large blocks of stock in both companies, was closed by order of the Maine bank commissioner. On March 15, 1927, White was indicted on 25 counts of larceny through false pretenses. The government alleged that White and his businesses had secured $474,500 in loans obtained by falsely representing that he would receive $500,000 from the estate of his mother. On June 6, 1927, the trustees in White's bankruptcy case filed petitions in United States bankruptcy court alleging that he was hiding over $1.7 million in assets. During the bankruptcy hearing, White was able account for all but $850,000 of the missing assets, but examination of additional records found $350,000 more in unaccounted assets, which reduced the amount of unaccounted funds to $1.2 million. On June 18, 1928, White pleaded guilty to five counts of grand larceny. On October 8, 1928, he was sentenced to three to five years in Massachusetts State Prison. He was released after two-and-a-half years.

White died on May 5, 1951.
