= Levi H. Greenwood =

American politician

Levi Heywood Greenwood
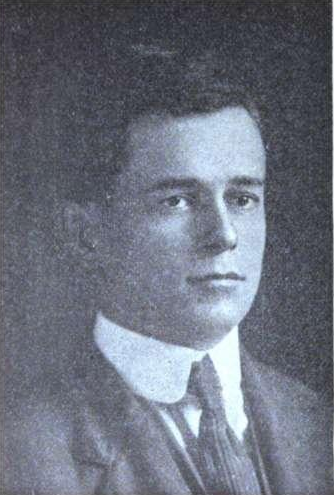
- Levi H. Greenwood

Member of the Massachusetts State Senate 3rd Worcester District
- In office January 1909 – January 1913
- Preceded by: J. Lovell Johnson
- Succeeded by: Edward Sibley

President of the Massachusetts State Senate
- In office January, 1912 – January, 1913
- Preceded by: Allen T. Treadway
- Succeeded by: Calvin Coolidge

Personal details
- Born: December 22, 1872 Gardner, Massachusetts
- Died: April 7, 1930 (aged 57) Tucson, Arizona
- Party: Republican
- Spouse: Mary Alberta Cann
- Children: Eleanor Greenwood (Hornblower), Margaret Greenwood; Richard N. Greenwood; Robert E. Greenwood
- Education: Harvard College ('1896)
- Profession: Newspaper publisher Manufacturer of furniture

Levi Heywood Greenwood (December 22, 1872 – April 7, 1930) was a businessman and Republican politician from Massachusetts in the late 19th and early 20th century. He was the father of Robert E. Greenwood, former mayor of Fitchburg.

== Early years ==
Greenwood was born in Gardner, Massachusetts, to Alvni M. and Helen R. Greenwood, on December 22, 1872.

== Marriage ==
Greenwood married Mary Alberta Cann of Brooklyn, New York on February 11, 1895. They had four children, Eleanor Greenwood (Hornblower), Margaret Greenwood, Richard Neal Greenwood and Robert E. Greenwood.

== Political career ==
Greenwood was President of the Massachusetts State Senate in 1912 and 1913.

=== 1913 election ===
In 1913 election, Greenwood had initially decided not to run for re-election the Senate but to run for lieutenant governor. He then changed his mind. His opposition to giving women the right to vote caused him to be a focus of opposition by the suffragist movement, and suffragists threw their support to Edward Sibley, Greenwood's opponent, which helped Sibley win.

== Businesses ==
=== Publisher ===
Greenwood was the Publisher and President of The Gardner News of Gardner, Massachusetts.

=== Furniture manufacturer ===
In 1912, Greenwood was one of the directors of Heywood Brothers and Wakefield Co, manufacturers of Rattan & Reed Furniture in Gardner. By 1921 Greenwood was one of the owners By 1926 he was the President of the

=== Directorships ===
Greenwood was also a corporate director of several banks (The First National Bank of Boston, The First National Bank of Gardner) and street railways (The Paducah Light and Traction Company, The Galveston-Houston Electric Company, and the Columbus Electric Company).

== See also ==
- 131st Massachusetts General Court (1910)
- 134th Massachusetts General Court (1913)

Political offices
Preceded by Allen T. Treadway	President of the Massachusetts Senate; January, 1912— January, 1913	Succeeded by Calvin Coolidge
Preceded by J. Lovell Johnson	Member of the Massachusetts State Senate; 3rd Worcester District; January, 1909— January, 1913	Succeeded by Edward Sibley
