= Eugene Foss =

American politician (1858–1939)

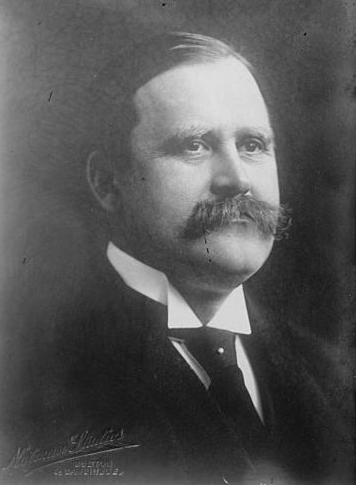
- Foss in 1910

45th Governor of Massachusetts
- In office January 5, 1911 – January 8, 1914
- Lieutenant: Louis A. Frothingham; Robert Luce; David I. Walsh
- Preceded by: Eben Sumner Draper
- Succeeded by: David I. Walsh

Member of the U.S. House of Representatives from Massachusetts's 14th district
- In office March 22, 1910 – January 4, 1911
- Preceded by: William C. Lovering
- Succeeded by: Robert O. Harris

Personal details
- Born: Eugene Noble Foss; September 24, 1858 West Berkshire, Vermont, U.S.
- Died: September 13, 1939 (aged 80) Jamaica Plain, Boston, Massachusetts, U.S.
- Party: Republican (1902–1909); Democratic (1909–1913); Independent (1913–1914); Democratic (1925)
- Spouse: Lilla Rollins Sturtevant (m. 1860; died 1925)
- Children: 4
- Education: University of Vermont
- Occupation: manufacturer industrialist president, B. F. Sturtevant Company
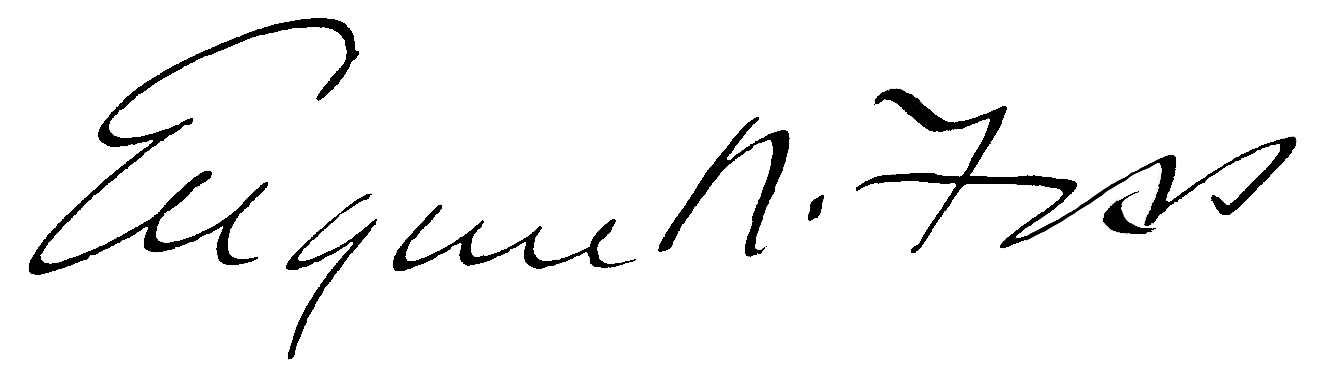
- Signature

Eugene Noble Foss (September 24, 1858 – September 13, 1939) was an American politician and manufacturer from Massachusetts. He was a member of the United States House of Representatives and served as a three-term governor of Massachusetts.

== Early years and business ==
Foss was born in West Berkshire, Vermont, a small town near the Canada–US border. His parents were George Edmund and Marcia (née Noble) Foss. Foss's father was a politically active manager at the St. Albans Manufacturing Company. The family moved to St. Albans, Vermont, when he was ten.

Foss was educated in public schools, and then attended Franklin County Academy in St. Albans, Vermont. He enrolled in the University of Vermont. He left the university after two years. Next, he studied law but dropped out to pursue business interests.

== Career ==
Foss first worked as a traveling salesman, selling a lumber-drying device for the company his father managed. He also was the sales agent for B. F. Sturtevant Company of Boston, selling its mill-related equipment. His success in this role prompted Benjamin Franklin Sturtevant to offer Foss a management job in Boston in 1882. The Sturtevant began producing industrial ventilation equipment and diversified into extensive ironworks.

Foss became the company president after Sturtevant died in April 1890. Under Foss's stewardship the company grew, opening branches in Berlin, Johannesburg, Paris, and Saint Petersburg as the Sturtevant Engineering Company. In 1901, he moved the primary manufacturing plant to Hyde Park, one of the finest such facilities in the United States. In its building that covered ten acres, Sturtevant Company made blowers, economizers, engines, forges, motors, turbines, and more.

In addition to serving as treasurer and manager of the Sturtevant Company, he was also president and director of the Becker Milling Machine Company in Hyde Park which had 500 employees in 1910. In addition, he was president of Mead-Morrison Manufacturing located in Cambridge, Massachusetts. With its 500 workers, Mead-Morrison made coal conveying and hosting machinery. He was also president of two cotton mills—the Maverick Cotton Mills in East Boston and the Burgess Mills at Pawtucket, Rhode Island which had 1,200 employees.

Foss was also president of the Bridgewater Water Company and director of the Brooklyn Heights Railroad Company, Brooklyn Rapid Transit Company, Chicago Junction Railways, the Hyde Park National Bank, Manhattan Elevated Railroad Company of New York, and the Union Stockyard Company. He was also a trustee and member of the executive committee of the Massachusetts Electric Company.

After politics, Foss returned to his former manufacturing business and also managed his real estate holdings in Boston. He expanded its production facilities to include the American Napier automobile.

== Politics ==
=== U.S. Congress ===
In 1902, Foss ran for U.S. Congress as a progressive Republican. His main issue was a tariff reform platform, calling for "free wool, free coal, free iron, and free hides" and reciprocity with Canada. His campaign was held while there were high coal prices that had badly hurt Massachusetts. While many voters blamed coal prices on the protective tariff, President Theodore Roosevelt attributed it to the ongoing 1902 anthracite coal strike.

Foss narrowly carried the Republican nomination in a September 24, 1902 caucus and started his campaign for control of the state party by submitting his revisionist plank at the October state party convention. His motion was defeated following a speech by Henry Cabot Lodge, urging national party unity in defense of the protective tariff. Foss lost the general election to John Andrew Sullivan.

In 1904, he was a delegate to the Republican National Convention. He ran for Congress again in 1904, with an even more embarrassing defeat. He next failed in a bid for the Republican nomination for lieutenant governor in 1906.

After Governor Eben Sumner Draper was elected in 1908, divisions within the state Republican Party deepened, especially over tariff reform. The party's position on tariffs led Foss to leave the party. In 1909, he bought his way onto the Democratic Party ticket as its nominee for lieutenant governor, but lost to the Republicans by a narrow margin.

In March 1910, Foss won a special election for United States House of Representatives, filling a vacancy caused by the death of William C. Lovering. He served until January 4, 1911, when he resigned to become governor of Massachusetts.

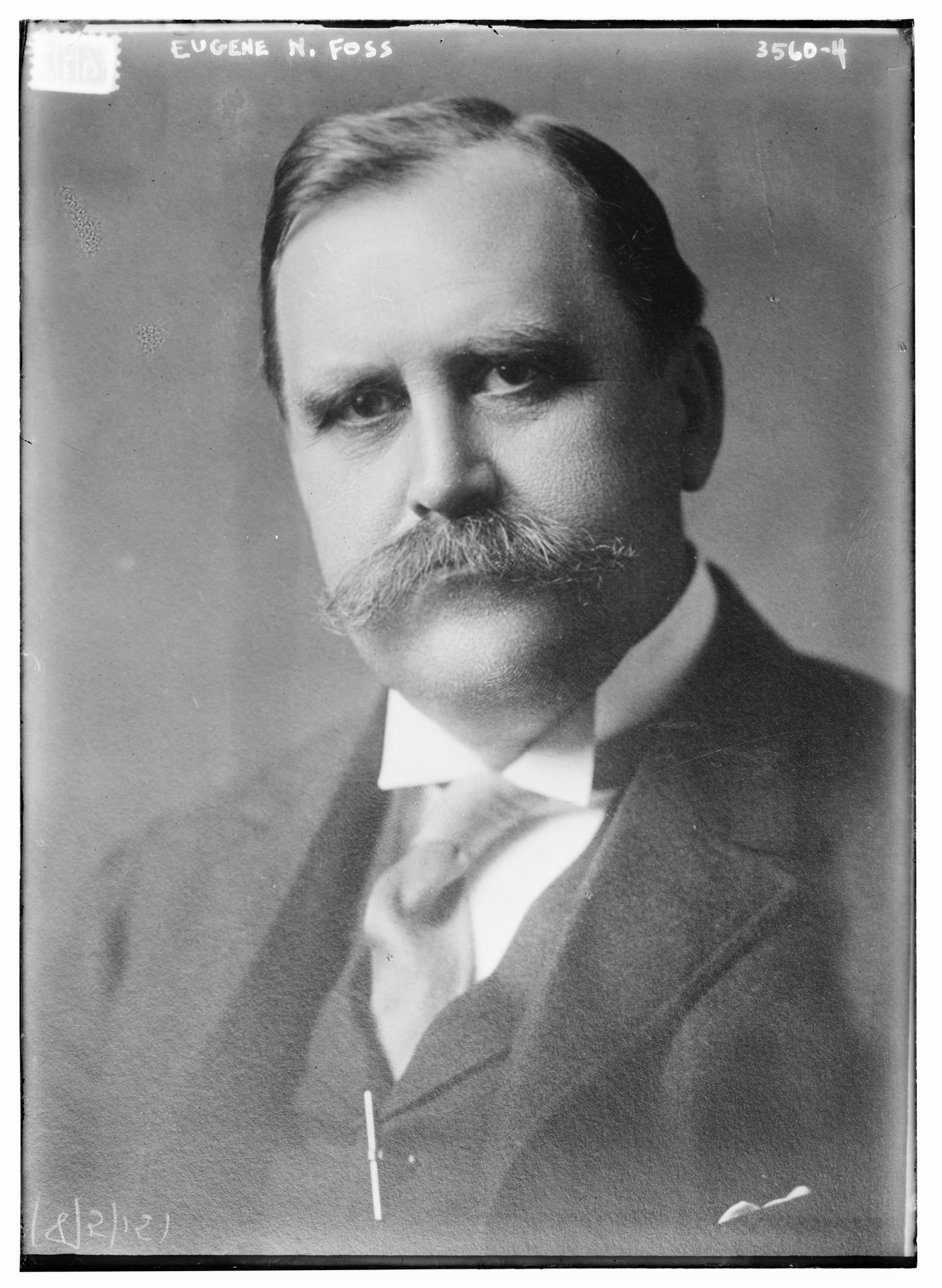
Eugene Foss, 1915

=== Governor ===
Foss then announced his intention to contend for the Democratic nomination for governor. The nominating convention was a contentious affair, with old-line labor Democrats opposing his nomination. Labor agitators criticized Foss for opposing bills that reduced maximum working hours, and supporting pro-business bills such as that authorizing the merger of the Boston and Maine Railroad with the New York, New Haven and Hartford Railroad. The convention deadlocked on the second ballot, between Foss and the previous year's nominee, James H. Vahey. There were fistfights on the floor, chairs were thrown, and the convention ended up appointing a committee to choose a nominee.

The committee also deadlocked, this time between Foss and Charles Sumner Hamlin. At this point, Foss announced that he intended to run regardless, and essentially demanded the party ratify his nomination. He won a mail election by a single vote. In the general election, labor Democrats attacked Draper's anti-labor record, while Foss essentially campaigned against the pro-tariff stance of Senator Lodge. The Republicans called in Theodore Roosevelt, in an attempt to paint Draper in a more favorable light. Foss won the election for Governor by 32,000 votes on November 8, 1910. He was reelected in 1911 and 1912.

During his three terms as governor, Foss enacted many reform measures. He signed measures covering employer liability and workmen's compensation, but also vetoed bills authorizing the tenure of school teachers and the right to picket. He signed an election reform bill changing primaries to direct elections, a bill setting a minimum wage for women and children, and a bill allowing jury trials for cases involving the violation of strike injunctions. In addition, a pension plan was started for state employees and part-time schooling for working children was also enforced. He also promoted and signed bills that benefited his businesses. In 1911 he led a somewhat quixotic campaign to deprive Senator Lodge of his seat; his campaigning ended up having the opposite effect, essentially killing the chances of either Democrats or progressive Republicans to unseat Lodge.

Foss's tenure included the 1912 textile strike in Lawrence, Massachusetts, which was stimulated by the passage of a law limiting the working hours of women and children. Organized by the Industrial Workers of the World (IWW, or Wobblies), the labor action united numerous immigrant groups and involved more than 20,000 workers in all of the industrial city's mills. Incidents of violence in the strike prompted Foss to call out the state militia, and he applied pressure on the mill owners to settle the action by threatening to withdraw them.

Foss denied clemency for Clarence Richeson for the sensationalized murder of Avis Linell. Richeson had documented bouts of mental problems and was convicted without trial after eventually pleading guilty to the charges. His case prompted calls for reforms in the state's handling and treatment of mental patients.

By 1913 Foss's anti-labor policies had disenchanted the state Democratic leadership, and Lieutenant Governor David I. Walsh announced that he would challenge Foss for the Democratic nomination. Foss received no support from the party but was offered—and declined—the opportunity to contest for the Bull Moose Party nomination. He eventually took out papers for the Republican nomination but failed to qualify for the primary ballot. He ran in the general election as an independent. It was a Democratic landslide, and Foss trailed far behind the other three candidates. He left office on January 4, 1914.

=== 1925 campaign for Congress ===
In 1925, Foss ran for the 5th Congressional District as a "Coolidge-Democrat." He lost by a huge margin and did not win any districts.

== Personal ==
On June 12, 1884, Foss married his employer's daughter, Lilla Rollins Sturtevant (1860–1925). Together, they had two sons and two daughters:

- Benjamin Sturtevant Foss (1886–1961), who married Dorothy Emily Chapman, a daughter of Wilfred Barrett Chapman, in 1911. They divorced in 1921.
- Guy Noble Foss (b. 1889), who married Katherine Cobb, a daughter of Frederick L. Cobb, in 1912.
- Esther Foss (1894–1954), a twin who married polo player George Gordon Moore. They divorced in 1933 and she married Aiden Roark, another polo player, in 1934. They divorced in 1937. and she married Sidney Webster Fish, son of Stuyvesant Fish.
- Helen Foss (b. 1894), a twin who married English polo player Henry Forrester in 1930.

He was as active in the Home Market Club of Boston and was also chair of the Republican Party in ward 23 of Boston. He was a trustee of the Boston Young Men's Christian Association (later the YMCA), Colby University, the Hebron Academy, the Newton Theological Seminary and the Vermont Academy. He was a member of the First Baptist Church in the Jamaica Plain neighborhood of Boston. He was a member of the Algonquin Club, the Boston Art Club, the Eliot Club, the Exchange Club, the Jamaica Club, and the Country Club.

He died in Jamaica Plain on September 13, 1939. He was buried in Forest Hills Cemetery in Boston.

Party political offices
Preceded by Charles J. Barton	Democratic nominee for Lieutenant Governor of Massachusetts; 1909	Succeeded by Thomas F. Cassidy
Preceded by James H. Vahey	Democratic nominee for Governor of Massachusetts; 1910, 1911, 1912	Succeeded by David I. Walsh
First	Progressive nominee for Governor of Massachusetts; 1910, 1911	Succeeded by Charles Sumner Bird
U.S. House of Representatives
Preceded by William C. Lovering	Member of the U.S. House of Representatives from Massachusetts district 14; March 22, 1910 – January 4, 1911	Succeeded by Robert O. Harris
Political offices
Preceded by Eben Sumner Draper	Governor of Massachusetts; 1911–1914	Succeeded by David I. Walsh
