= 1916 Massachusetts legislature =

137th Massachusetts General Court
←	136th	138th	→

Overview
- Legislative body: General Court

Senate
- Members: 40

House
- Members: 240

The 137th Massachusetts General Court, consisting of the Massachusetts Senate and the Massachusetts House of Representatives, met in 1916.

== Senators ==
image	name	date of birth	district
	Frank Bartlett		
	Sanford Bates	July 17, 1884	
	William A. L. Bazeley	1872	
	Charles Sumner Beal	August 14, 1856	1st Plymouth
	James W. Bean	May 11, 1866	
	John E. Beck	May 10, 1869	
	Charles Donnell Brown	June 5, 1862	
	James F. Cavanagh		
	Daniel J. Chapman	January 18, 1878	
	Ezra W. Clark	October 12, 1842	
	Herbert E. Cummings		
	Charles W. Eldridge	October 16, 1877	
	George H. Ellis	October 3, 1848	
	Frank S. Farnsworth		
	Wilton B. Fay		
	Charles L. Gifford	March 15, 1871	
	Gurdon W. Gordon		
	James I. Green	April 9, 1885	
	John W. Haigis	July 31, 1881	
	Martin Hays	October 14, 1876	
	Clarence Whitman Hobbs Jr.	October 1, 1878	
	John B. Hull Jr.	July 17, 1871	
	George H. Jackson	March 9, 1865	
	Charles A. Kimball		
	Richard Knowles		
	Louis F. R. Langelier		
	George Edward Marchand	December 22, 1877	
	Joseph W. Martin Jr.	November 3, 1884	
	Orion T. Mason		
	Philip J. McGonagle	October 21, 1871	
	Walter E. McLane		
	Edward F. McLaughlin	June 6, 1883	
	W. Prentiss Parker	December 11, 1857	
	E. Howard Perley		
	John F. Sheehan		
	James R. Tetler	August 26, 1877	
	James P. Timilty	March 28, 1865	
	Nathan A. Tufts	April 15, 1879	
	Robert M. Washburn	January 4, 1868	
	Henry Gordon Wells	October 12, 1879	

== Representatives ==
image	name	date of birth	district
	Essex S. Abbott		
	Henry Achin Jr.	June 30, 1883	
	George C. F. Allen		14th Essex
	Philip R. Ammidon		
	Algodt N. Anderson		
	Charles H. Annis	January 12, 1869	
	William M. Armstrong	August 17, 1850	
	Benjamin S. Atwood		
	George W. P. Babb		
	James T. Bagshaw		
	Edmund Baker		
	William B. Baldwin	September 18, 1854	
	Philip Hosmer Ball		
	Arthur W. Barker		
	William J. Barry	1861	
	Thomas William Baxter		
	Addison P. Beardsley		
	Joseph Belcher		
	Joseph J. Benson		
	James D. Bentley	February 6, 1884	
	Jacob Bitzer	January 16, 1865	
	Alvin E. Bliss		
	Cornelius Boothman		
	Eden K. Bowser		
	Manassah Edward Bradley		
	Thomas H. Brennan		
	James J. Brennan	May 2, 1882	
	Clarence A. Briggs		
	Vincent Brogna		
	Fred Johnson Brown		
	Charles Henry Brown	September 25, 1873	
	Daniel J. Buckley		
	George Bunting	August 31, 1868	
	Arthur E. Burr		
	Frederick Butler		
	Fred E. Cady		
	Julius F. Carman	August 7, 1861	
	Daniel W. Casey		
	Allison G. Catheron	June 26, 1878	
	George Dudley Chamberlain		
	Albert Minot Chandler		
	Edward Earl Chapman		
	Charles Chapman		
	John W. Churchill	November 17, 1853	
	Frederic F. Clauss		
	James Coffey	May 17, 1849	
	Arthur Willard Colburn	December 1, 1877	
	Benjamin G. Collins		
	Samuel I. Collins	March 4, 1851	
	D. Herbert Cook	June 2, 1851	
	Thomas J. Cooley		
	John J. Courtney		
	Channing H. Cox	October 28, 1879	
	John W. Craig		
	Burton H. Crosby		
	Fred Wilder Cross	September 15, 1868	
	John J. Cummings		
	George E. Curran		
	Edward N. Dahlborg		
	Samuel Davis	June 4, 1866	
	Theodore H. Day		
	George F. Dennis		
	Thomas F. Donovan	September 26, 1890	
	John L. Donovan	June 3, 1876	
	Thomas E. Dowd		
	Frederic E. Dowling		
	George P. Drury		
	Edward B. Eames	April 15, 1856	
	Carl C. Emery	November 4, 1888	
	John P. Englert		
	John G. Faxon		
	Horace F. Field		
	Charles D. Fisher		
	Michael J. Fitzgerald	March 10, 1878	
	John I. Fitzgerald	July 18, 1882	
	William J. Foley	March 2, 1887	
	Harry C. Foster	August 27, 1871	
	Arthur W. Frail		
	Joseph E. Freeling		
	William P. French	April 30, 1874	
	William F. French	March 21, 1873	
	Harvey E. Frost	October 2, 1875	
	Charles Benjamin Frothingham	November 11, 1858	
	Mauran I. Furbish		
	Charles F. Garrity		
	Harry C. Gates		
	John Mellen Gibbs		
	Thomas J. Giblin		
	John J. Gillis		
	Nesbit G. Gleason		
	Fred Parker Greenwood		
	Julius Guild	March 30, 1850	
	Edgar H. Hall		
	John Halliwell	February 21, 1864	
	Walter A. Hardy	December 15, 1866	
	Edward F. Harrington (state representative)	August 10, 1878	
	James L. Harrop		
	George F. Hart	November 9, 1859	
	Charles H. Hartshorn		
	William M. Haskins		
	James William Hayes		
	Matthew A. Higgins		
	Francis M. Hill		
	Kenneth Page Hill		
	John A. Hirsch	1861	
	William J. Holland		
	Peter Holt		
	Horace W. Hosie	February 2, 1864	
	John C. Hull (politician)	November 1, 1870	
	Charles N. James	September 3, 1853	
	Henry W. Jarvis		
	Victor Francis Jewett		
	John G. Johnson	May 23, 1864	
	Michael H. Jordan	February 7, 1863	
	Thomas Martin Joyce		
	John Joseph Kearney		
	David Leon Kelley	April 26, 1889	
	Edward I. Kelley		
	William W. Kennard		
	Robert T. Kent		
	Joseph O. Knox		
	Arthur F. Lamb		
	Ernest A. LaRocque		
	Charles S. Lawler		
	Joseph M. Levenson		
	John N. Levins		
	Fred Oliver Lewis	June 12, 1878	
	George E. Lilley		
	Daniel Waldo Lincoln	September 2, 1882	
	George A. Lindberg		
	George Washington Love		
	James MacFarlane Lyle		
	Frank E. Lyman	September 15, 1866	
	Luther B. Lyman	November 13, 1853	
	John H. Lynch	October 28, 1884	
	James E. MacPherson		
	John P. Mahoney	May 26, 1888	
	Lloyd Makepeace		
	Michael F. Malone		
	David Mancovitz	August 15, 1877	
	Frank A. Manning		
	Felix A. Marcella		
	Robert B. Martin		
	John Edwin Maybury		
	John Henry McAllister		
	Peter F. McCarty		
	Joseph McGrath (American politician)	December 20, 1890	
	James H. McInerney	December 13, 1871	
	Frederick William McKenzie		
	Michael J. McNamee		
	Charles J. McNulty		
	Samuel H. Mildram		
	John Mitchell	September 4, 1877	
	John L. Monahan		
	Wesley E. Monk	August 1, 1874	
	Alfred James Moore	August 7, 1891	
	Daniel T. Morrill		
	Edward G. Morris		
	James Morrison	February 17, 1857	
	Frank Mulveny		
	John J. Murphy	March 26, 1889	
	Dennis A. Murphy	September 26, 1876	
	William A. Murray	June 17, 1889	
	Ken Nash		
	Arthur N. Newhall		
	John P. Nickerson		
	Francis Norwood		
	John Joseph O'Brien		
	John Joseph O'Connell		
	James T. O'Dowd		
	Joseph A. Oakhem		
	James E. Odlin		
	Ambrose F. Ogden		
	John N. Osborne	January 28, 1853	
	George E. Osgood		
	Peter C. Paradis		
	John H. Parker	August 27, 1859	
	Ward Mayhew Parker		
	Chauncey Pepin		
	Harold L. Perrin		
	Edward Howland Perry		
	Joseph H. Perry	May 4, 1869	
	Joseph C. Perry	May 1, 1856	
	James E. Phelan	October 21, 1884	
	Frederick Everett Pierce	May 5, 1862	
	James Tracy Potter	January 26, 1870	
	Francis Prescott		
	Albert T. Quiry		
	William C. Renne		
	George Louis Richards		
	Charles Freeman Rowley		
	Louis Hooker Ruggles		
	William F. Runnells	February 18, 1865	
	G. Oscar Russell		
	John D. Ryan	July 30, 1868	
	Edward Julius Sandberg	October 21, 1866	
	Joseph A. Saunders		
	Frederick W. Schlapp		
	C. Burnside Seagrave		
	C. Edgar Searing		
	John H. Sherburne	1877	
	Michael J. Sherry		
	Samuel Silverman		
	Allston M. Sinnott		
	Jerome S. Smith		
	Fitz-Henry Smith Jr.		
	William O. Souther Jr.		
	Joseph Fayette Stone	February 8, 1858	
	Merrill E. Streeter		
	Denis J. Sullivan	July 24, 1889	
	William H. Sullivan	February 20, 1869	
	Simon Swig	1862	
	James E. Tolman	November 8, 1867	
	Albert Mason Tyler		
	George J. Wall		
	Robert J. Ware		
	Joseph E. Warner	May 16, 1884	
	George B. Waterman		
	William E. Weeks	1880	
	Thomas Weston Jr		
	Albert L. Whitman		
	Edgar H. Whitney		
	Waterman Lester Williams	August 10, 1867	
	Alvin R. Wilson		
	Herbert A. Wilson	November 27, 1870	
	Walter Edgar Wolfe		
	Isaac U. Wood		
	William H. Woodhead	September 17, 1860	
	Harry C. Woodill		
	George M. Worrall		
	Benjamin Loring Young	1885	

== See also ==
- 1916 Massachusetts gubernatorial election
- 64th United States Congress
- List of Massachusetts General Courts
