= 1918 Massachusetts legislature =

139th Massachusetts General Court
←	138th	140th	→

Overview
- Legislative body: General Court
- Election: November 6, 1917

Senate
- Members: 40
- President: Henry Gordon Wells
- Party control: Republican

House
- Members: 240
- Speaker: Channing H. Cox
- Party control: Republican

Sessions
- 1st: January 2, 1918 – June 3, 1918

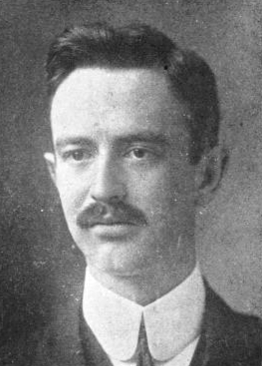
Henry Gordon Wells, Senate president.

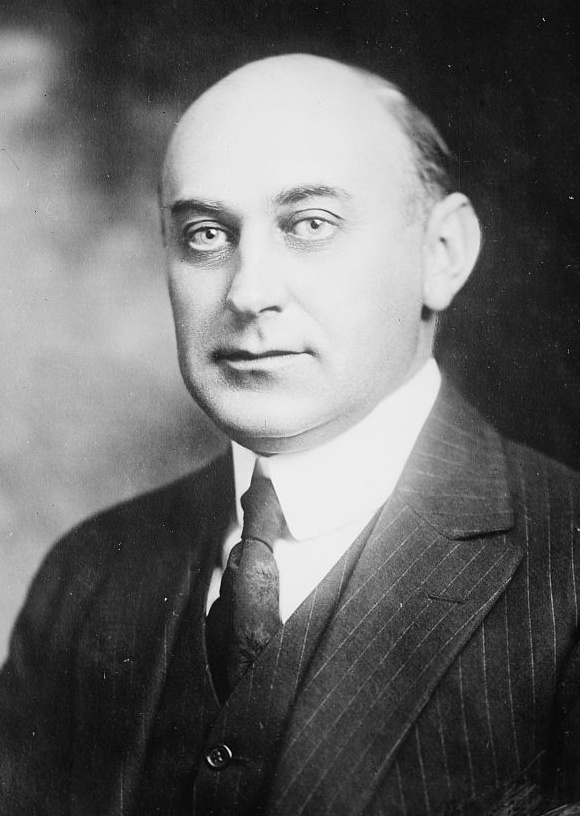
Channing H. Cox, House speaker.

Leaders of the Massachusetts General Court, 1918.

The 139th Massachusetts General Court, consisting of the Massachusetts Senate and the Massachusetts House of Representatives, met in 1918 during the governorship of Samuel W. McCall. Henry Gordon Wells served as president of the Senate and Channing H. Cox served as speaker of the House.

== Senators ==
image	name	date of birth	district
	John E. Beck	May 10, 1869	1st Suffolk
	Charles Donnell Brown	June 5, 1862	
	Daniel J. Buckley		
	James F. Cavanagh		
	George Dudley Chamberlain		
	George B. Churchill	October 24, 1866	
	Arthur Willard Colburn	December 1, 1877	
	Fred Wilder Cross	September 15, 1868	
	George E. Curran		
	Edward N. Dahlborg		
	Edward B. Eames	April 15, 1856	
	John I. Fitzgerald	July 18, 1882	
	Charles L. Gifford	March 15, 1871	
	John Halliwell	February 21, 1864	
	Leonard F. Hardy		
	James L. Harrop		
	George Fred Hart	November 9, 1859	
	George A. Hastings		
	Clarence Whitman Hobbs Jr.	October 1, 1878	
	Ernest E. Hobson	September 29, 1878	
	Herman Hormel		
	George H. Jackson	March 9, 1865	
	Joseph O. Knox		
	Charles S. Lawler		
	James E. MacPherson		
	Edwin T. McKnight	October 11, 1869	
	Walter E. McLane		
	Edward F. McLaughlin	June 6, 1883	
	Edward G. Morris		
	Ken Nash		
	Malcolm Nichols	May 8, 1876	
	E. Howard Perley		
	Harold L. Perrin		
	Silas D. Reed		
	William Eustis Russell		
	Alpheus Sanford		
	Charles Sumner Smith		
	James R. Tetler	August 26, 1877	
	Henry Gordon Wells	October 12, 1879	
	Herbert A. Wilson	November 27, 1870	

== Representatives ==
image	name	date of birth	district
	Essex S. Abbott		
	Henry Achin Jr.	June 30, 1883	
	Peter I. Adams		
	Frank G. Allen	October 6, 1874	8th Norfolk
	J. Weston Allen	April 19, 1872	
	Ernest William Allen		
	George C. F. Allen		
	Philip R. Ammidon		
	Seth Fenelon Arnold	December 21, 1878	
	Harrison Henry Atwood	August 26, 1863	
	Charles M. Austin	May 2, 1884	
	George W. P. Babb		
	James T. Bagshaw		
	John Henry Baker		
	William B. Baldwin	September 18, 1854	
	George Storer Baldwin		
	John Ballantyne	July 9, 1869	
	Joseph L. Barry		
	Herbert Amiel Bartlett		
	Frank Bartlett		
	William A. Bartlett		
	Russell T. Bates		
	George J. Bates	February 25, 1891	
	Thomas William Baxter		
	Charles H. Beaman		
	Alton Leroy Bellows		
	Chauncey A. Bennett		
	James D. Bentley	February 6, 1884	
	Jay Rogers Benton		
	Alfred M. Bessette	March 25, 1876	
	Jacob Bitzer	January 16, 1865	
	Giles Blague		
	Arthur Franklin Blanchard	January 27, 1883	
	Alvin E. Bliss		
	Cornelius Boothman		
	Arthur Bower		
	Eden K. Bowser		
	Albert C. Bray		
	Elmer L. Briggs		
	Fred Johnson Brown		
	Arthur Stanley Browne		
	George J. Brunell	November 1, 1865	
	George Bunting	August 31, 1868	
	Frank James Burke	September 8, 1885	
	Arthur E. Burr		
	Fred J. Burrell	March 12, 1889	
	Frederick Butler		
	Ralph N. Butterworth		
	George H. Carrick		
	John B. Cashman		
	Herman Stanley Cheney		
	Henry S. Clark		
	Frederic F. Clauss		
	Benjamin G. Collins		
	William S. Conroy	October 2, 1877	
	Harry A. Cooke		
	Charles L. Cooley		
	Thomas J. Corbett	May 10, 1883	
	Edwin S. Corey		
	Robert Shaw Corrigan		
	Patrick M. Costello		
	Henry E. Cowdrey		
	Edward J. Cox		
	William F. Craig	September 15, 1866	
	John W. Craig		
	John Cronin		
	Clarence A. Crooks		
	John T. Crowley	November 15, 1872	
	Warren Chapman Daggett	May 10, 1868	
	Henry Ellsworth Dean	September 29, 1862	
	George F. Dennis		
	Thomas F. Donovan	September 26, 1890	
	John L. Donovan	June 3, 1876	
	James Beattie Dow		
	Andrew P. Doyle	August 15, 1869	
	Timothy J. Driscoll		
	Eddy P. Dunbar		
	Horace E. Dunkle		
	William F. Dwyer		
	Carl C. Emery	November 4, 1888	
	John P. Englert		
	Philip J. Feinberg		
	James R. Ferry		
	Samuel B. Finkel		
	Michael J. Fitzgerald	March 10, 1878	
	Michael A. Flanagan	February 21, 1890	
	William Fleming		
	William J. Foley	March 2, 1887	
	William Foster	January 21, 1869	
	Joseph E. Freeling		
	William F. French	March 21, 1873	
	William P. French	April 30, 1874	
	Charles Benjamin Frothingham	November 11, 1858	
	Howard F. Furness		
	John Mellen Gibbs		
	Edwin H. Gibson		
	Daniel J. Gillen		
	Nesbit G. Gleason		
	Charles Waite Gould	May 8, 1891	
	William J. Granfield	December 18, 1889	
	Clarence H. Granger		
	Thomas H. Green	May 11, 1883	
	Fred Parker Greenwood		
	Clarence Milton Hall		
	John Otis Hamilton		
	Rowland P. Harriman		
	Edward F. Harrington (state representative)	August 10, 1878	
	Charles H. Hartshorn		
	William M. Haskins		
	James William Hayes		
	Walter Haynes		
	Martin Hays	October 14, 1876	
	William H. Hearn		
	Matthew A. Higgins		
	John A. Hirsch	1861	
	William J. Holland		
	Edgar F. Howland		
	John Robert Hudson		
	John C. Hull (politician)	November 1, 1870	
	Victor Francis Jewett		
	William Louis Johnson	October 23, 1856	
	John G. Johnson	May 23, 1864	
	Arthur Westgate Jones	January 11, 1873	
	Benjamin Oliver Jones	July 28, 1882	
	Michael H. Jordan	February 7, 1863	
	Thomas Martin Joyce		
	Charles A. Kelley	March 24, 1862	
	Edward I. Kelley		
	David Leon Kelley	April 26, 1889	
	Nathaniel Putnam Kellogg		
	Robert T. Kent		
	James F. Kiernan	February 1, 1884	
	William Aiken Kneeland		
	Martin R. Lane		
	Ernest A. LaRocque		
	Thomas Leavitt		
	William G. Lord		
	Frank E. Lyman	September 15, 1866	
	Winthrop Magee		
	John P. Mahoney	May 26, 1888	
	William Henry Mahoney		
	Lloyd Makepeace		
	Michael F. Malone		
	David J. Maloney		
	Frank A. Manning		
	William J. Manning		
	Arthur E. Marsh		
	George S. Marsh	February 18, 1858	
	Robert B. Martin		
	John Henry McAllister		
	William H. McDonnell	April 9, 1885	
	Joseph McGrath (American politician)	December 20, 1890	
	David Story McIntosh		
	Francis P. McKeon		
	Francis B. McKinney		
	Henry J. McLaughlin		
	William Raymond McMenimen		
	Michael J. McNamee		
	Stephen R. Mealey		
	Walter L. Mellen	January 10, 1868	
	Bernard F. Merriam		
	Julius Meyers	December 6, 1854	
	John Mitchell	September 4, 1877	
	Wesley E. Monk	August 1, 1874	
	James G. Moran	May 2, 1870	
	Charles H. Morrill	October 6, 1874	
	James Morrison	February 17, 1857	
	George D. Morse		
	J. Warren Moulton		
	James J. Moynihan		
	Frank Mulveny		
	Daniel C. Murphy	December 14, 1887	
	Dennis A. Murphy	September 26, 1876	
	John J. Murphy	March 26, 1889	
	Arthur L. Nason	October 24, 1872	
	Christian Nelson		
	Oscar H. Nelson		
	Arthur N. Newhall		
	Frederic C. Nichols		
	George L. Nourse		
	Edward H. Nutting	July 6, 1869	
	Charles S. O'Connor		
	John D. O'Connor	May 7, 1886	
	James E. Odlin		
	William W. Ollendorff		
	John Glenn Orr	February 27, 1857	
	John N. Osborne	January 28, 1853	
	Walter T. Packard		
	Arthur W. Paine		
	George Penshorn		
	Chauncey Pepin		
	Walter Perham		
	Frederick Everett Pierce	May 5, 1862	
	Leland Powers		
	Francis Prescott		
	Frank H. Putnam		
	Lawrence F. Quigley		
	Timothy F. Quinn		
	Dennis F. Reardon		
	George Louis Richards		
	Arthur W. Robinson		
	Charles Freeman Rowley		
	Roland D. Sawyer	January 8, 1874	
	Edward A. Scigliano		
	Harry L. Shedd		
	Michael Nathaniel Slotnick		
	Charles Henry Slowey		
	Jerome S. Smith		
	Fitz-Henry Smith Jr.		
	Dexter Avery Snow	January 3, 1890	
	Gilbert G. Southworth		
	Burgess H. Spinney		
	William N. Stetson		
	Simon Swig	1862	
	Warren E. Tarbell		
	James E. Tolman	November 8, 1867	
	Frank A. Torrey	December 21, 1874	
	Charles L. Underhill	July 20, 1867	
	Albert P. Wadleigh		
	George Walker		
	Albert T. Wall		
	Joseph E. Warner	May 16, 1884	
	Jacob Wasserman		
	George B. Waterman		
	Thomas Weston, Jr		
	Joseph W. Wharton		
	Bion Thomas Wheeler		
	Albert L. Whitman		
	George A. Whitney		
	Alvin R. Wilson		
	Charles A. Winchester		
	Carlton Walen Wonson		
	Isaac U. Wood		
	Wilbur A. Wood		
	Harry C. Woodill		
	George M. Worrall		
	Myron A. Young		
	Benjamin Loring Young	1885	

== See also ==
- 1918 Massachusetts gubernatorial election
- 65th United States Congress
- List of Massachusetts General Courts

== Images ==
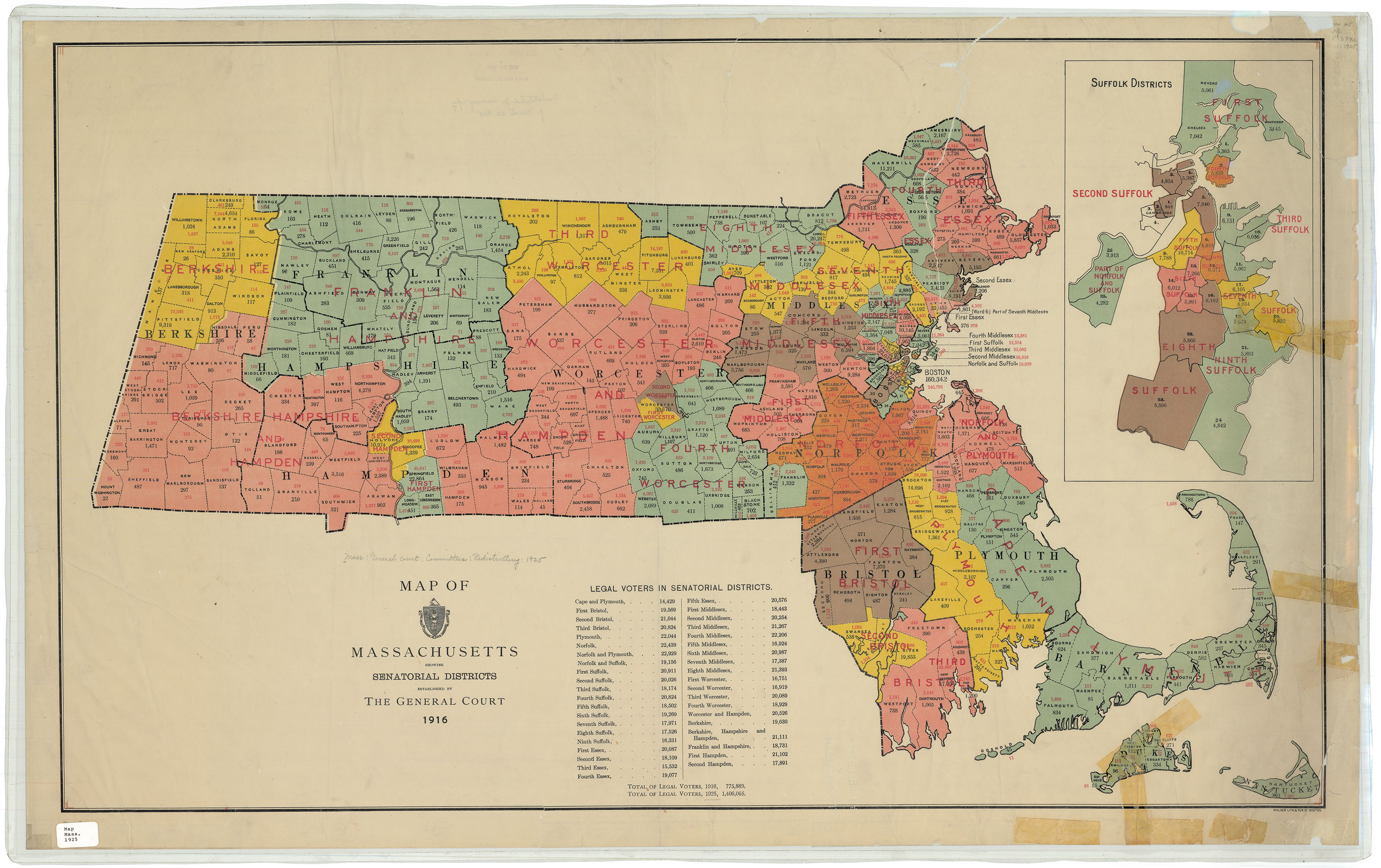
Map of districts of the Massachusetts state senate apportioned in 1916
