= 1917 Massachusetts legislature =

138th Massachusetts General Court
←	137th	139th	→

Overview
- Legislative body: General Court

Senate
- Members: 40

House
- Members: 240

The 138th Massachusetts General Court, consisting of the Massachusetts Senate and the Massachusetts House of Representatives, met in 1917.

== Senators ==
image	name	date of birth	district
	James W. Bean	May 11, 1866	2nd Middlesex
	John E. Beck	May 10, 1869	
	Charles Donnell Brown	June 5, 1862	
	Daniel J. Buckley		
	James F. Cavanagh		
	George Dudley Chamberlain		
	George B. Churchill	October 24, 1866	
	Arthur Willard Colburn	December 1, 1877	
	Fred Wilder Cross	September 15, 1868	
	Edward N. Dahlborg		
	Charles W. Eldridge	October 16, 1877	
	John I. Fitzgerald	July 18, 1882	
	Charles L. Gifford	March 15, 1871	
	James L. Harrop		
	George Fred Hart	November 9, 1859	
	George A. Hastings		
	Clarence Whitman Hobbs Jr.	October 1, 1878	
	Ernest E. Hobson	September 29, 1878	
	Herman Hormel		
	John B. Hull Jr.	July 17, 1871	
	George H. Jackson	March 9, 1865	
	Charles A. Kimball		
	Richard Knowles		
	Charles S. Lawler		
	James E. MacPherson		
	Joseph W. Martin Jr.	November 3, 1884	
	Orion T. Mason		
	Edwin T. McKnight	October 11, 1869	
	Walter E. McLane		
	Edward F. McLaughlin	June 6, 1883	
	Edward G. Morris		
	Ken Nash		
	Malcolm Nichols	May 8, 1876	
	E. Howard Perley		
	Alpheus Sanford		
	Charles Sumner Smith		
	James R. Tetler	August 26, 1877	
	James P. Timilty	March 28, 1865	
	Henry Gordon Wells	October 12, 1879	
	Herbert A. Wilson	November 27, 1870	

== Representatives ==
image	name	date of birth	district
	Essex S. Abbott		
	Henry Achin Jr.	June 30, 1883	
	Peter I. Adams		6th Berkshire
	Park W. Allen		
	Ernest William Allen		
	George C. F. Allen		
	J. Weston Allen	April 19, 1872	
	Philip R. Ammidon		
	Charles H. Annis	January 12, 1869	
	Harrison Henry Atwood	August 26, 1863	
	George W. P. Babb		
	James T. Bagshaw		
	William B. Baldwin	September 18, 1854	
	Joseph L. Barry		
	Frank Bartlett		
	William A. Bartlett		
	Russell T. Bates		
	Thomas William Baxter		
	Charles H. Beaman		
	Addison P. Beardsley		
	Chauncey A. Bennett		
	James D. Bentley	February 6, 1884	
	Jay Rogers Benton		
	Alfred M. Bessette	March 25, 1876	
	Jacob Bitzer	January 16, 1865	
	Alvin E. Bliss		
	Cornelius Boothman		
	Arthur Bower		
	George W. Bowman		
	Eden K. Bowser		
	Manassah Edward Bradley		
	Albert C. Bray		
	Thomas H. Brennan		
	Clarence A. Briggs		
	Elmer L. Briggs		
	Vincent Brogna		
	Fred Johnson Brown		
	George J. Brunell	November 1, 1865	
	George Bunting	August 31, 1868	
	Frank James Burke	September 8, 1885	
	Arthur E. Burr		
	Fred J. Burrell	March 12, 1889	
	Frederick Butler		
	Ralph N. Butterworth		
	Fred E. Cady		
	Edward Carr	December 18, 1868	
	George H. Carrick		
	Daniel W. Casey		
	Albert Minot Chandler		
	Jeremiah K. Chandler	September 30, 1863	
	Henry S. Clark		
	Frederic F. Clauss		
	Samuel I. Collins	March 4, 1851	
	Benjamin G. Collins		
	William S. Conroy	October 2, 1877	
	Thomas J. Corbett	May 10, 1883	
	Henry E. Cowdrey		
	Channing H. Cox	October 28, 1879	
	Edward J. Cox		
	John W. Craig		
	John Cronin		
	John T. Crowley	November 15, 1872	
	George E. Curran		
	Henry Ellsworth Dean	September 29, 1862	
	George F. Dennis		
	John L. Donovan	June 3, 1876	
	Thomas F. Donovan	September 26, 1890	
	Thomas E. Dowd		
	Eddy P. Dunbar		
	Horace E. Dunkle		
	Edward B. Eames	April 15, 1856	
	Carl C. Emery	November 4, 1888	
	John P. Englert		
	James R. Ferry		
	Michael J. Fitzgerald	March 10, 1878	
	Michael A. Flanagan	February 21, 1890	
	William Fleming		
	William J. Foley	March 2, 1887	
	William Foster	January 21, 1869	
	Arthur W. Frail		
	Joseph E. Freeling		
	William P. French	April 30, 1874	
	William F. French	March 21, 1873	
	Harvey E. Frost	October 2, 1875	
	Charles Benjamin Frothingham	November 11, 1858	
	Howard F. Furness		
	John Mellen Gibbs		
	Edwin H. Gibson		
	Nesbit G. Gleason		
	William J. Granfield	December 18, 1889	
	Clarence H. Granger		
	Fred Parker Greenwood		
	Julius Guild	March 30, 1850	
	Clarence Milton Hall		
	John Halliwell	February 21, 1864	
	Leo Spotten Hamburger		
	Walter A. Hardy	December 15, 1866	
	Rowland P. Harriman		
	Edward F. Harrington (state representative)	August 10, 1878	
	Charles H. Hartshorn		
	William M. Haskins		
	James William Hayes		
	Walter Haynes		
	Martin Hays	October 14, 1876	
	Matthew A. Higgins		
	Francis M. Hill		
	Kenneth Page Hill		
	John A. Hirsch	1861	
	William J. Holland		
	Horace W. Hosie	February 2, 1864	
	John Robert Hudson		
	John C. Hull (politician)	November 1, 1870	
	Henry W. Jarvis		
	Victor Francis Jewett		
	William Louis Johnson	October 23, 1856	
	John G. Johnson	May 23, 1864	
	Michael H. Jordan	February 7, 1863	
	Thomas Martin Joyce		
	John Joseph Kearney		
	David Leon Kelley	April 26, 1889	
	Charles A. Kelley	March 24, 1862	
	William W. Kennard		
	Robert T. Kent		
	James F. Kiernan	February 1, 1884	
	William Aiken Kneeland		
	Joseph O. Knox		
	Martin R. Lane		
	Ernest A. LaRocque		
	Thomas Leavitt		
	George E. Lilley		
	Daniel Waldo Lincoln	September 2, 1882	
	George A. Lindberg		
	Martin Lomasney	December 3, 1859	
	William G. Lord		
	George Washington Love		
	James MacFarlane Lyle		
	Frank E. Lyman	September 15, 1866	
	John H. Lynch	October 28, 1884	
	Eugene Anthony Lynch		
	Winthrop Magee		
	John P. Mahoney	May 26, 1888	
	William Henry Mahoney		
	Lloyd Makepeace		
	Michael F. Malone		
	David J. Maloney		
	Frank A. Manning		
	William J. Manning		
	George S. Marsh	February 18, 1858	
	Arthur E. Marsh		
	Robert B. Martin		
	John Edwin Maybury		
	John Henry McAllister		
	Joseph McGrath (American politician)	December 20, 1890	
	James H. McInerney	December 13, 1871	
	David Story McIntosh		
	Francis B. McKinney		
	Henry J. McLaughlin		
	Michael J. McNamee		
	Charles J. McNulty		
	Walter L. Mellen	January 10, 1868	
	Bernard F. Merriam		
	Julius Meyers	December 6, 1854	
	John Mitchell	September 4, 1877	
	Wesley E. Monk	August 1, 1874	
	William A. Moore		
	Alfred James Moore	August 7, 1891	
	James G. Moran	May 2, 1870	
	Daniel T. Morrill		
	Charles H. Morrill	October 6, 1874	
	James Morrison	February 17, 1857	
	George D. Morse		
	J. Warren Moulton		
	Frank Mulveny		
	John J. Murphy	March 26, 1889	
	Dennis A. Murphy	September 26, 1876	
	Daniel C. Murphy	December 14, 1887	
	William A. Murray	June 17, 1889	
	Arthur L. Nason	October 24, 1872	
	Charles S. O'Connor		
	Joseph A. Oakhem		
	James E. Odlin		
	John Glenn Orr	February 27, 1857	
	John N. Osborne	January 28, 1853	
	Walter T. Packard		
	Arthur W. Paine		
	John H. Parker	August 27, 1859	
	Ward Mayhew Parker		
	George Penshorn		
	Chauncey Pepin		
	Walter Perham		
	Harold L. Perrin		
	Edward Howland Perry		
	Joseph H. Perry	May 4, 1869	
	Frederick Everett Pierce	May 5, 1862	
	James Tracy Potter	January 26, 1870	
	Frank H. Putnam		
	Lawrence F. Quigley		
	Frank E. Raymond		
	Dennis F. Reardon		
	George Louis Richards		
	Charles Freeman Rowley		
	William F. Runnells	February 18, 1865	
	G. Oscar Russell		
	Joseph A. Saunders		
	Henry A. Savage		
	Roland D. Sawyer	January 8, 1874	
	John H. Sherburne	1877	
	Charles Henry Slowey		
	Fitz-Henry Smith Jr.		
	Jerome S. Smith		
	Gilbert G. Southworth		
	Burgess H. Spinney		
	William N. Stetson		
	Merrill E. Streeter		
	Lewis R. Sullivan		
	Denis J. Sullivan	July 24, 1889	
	Simon Swig	1862	
	Warren E. Tarbell		
	James E. Tolman	November 8, 1867	
	George Albert Wales		
	Joseph E. Warner	May 16, 1884	
	Jacob Wasserman		
	George B. Waterman		
	Thomas Weston, Jr		
	Joseph W. Wharton		
	Albert L. Whitman		
	George A. Whitney		
	Waterman Lester Williams	August 10, 1867	
	John W. Williams		
	Alvin R. Wilson		
	Charles A. Winchester		
	Thomas A. Winston		
	Roger Wolcott	July 25, 1877	
	Isaac U. Wood		
	Harry C. Woodill		
	John Wooldredge		
	George M. Worrall		
	Daniel J. Young		
	Myron A. Young		
	Benjamin Loring Young	1885	

== See also ==
- 1917 Massachusetts gubernatorial election
- 65th United States Congress
- List of Massachusetts General Courts
