= 1915 Massachusetts legislature =

136th Massachusetts General Court
←	135th	137th	→

Overview
- Legislative body: General Court
- Election: November 3, 1914

Senate
- Members: 40
- President: Calvin Coolidge
- Party control: Republican

House
- Members: 240
- Speaker: Channing H. Cox
- Party control: Republican

Sessions
- 1st: January 6, 1915 – June 4, 1915

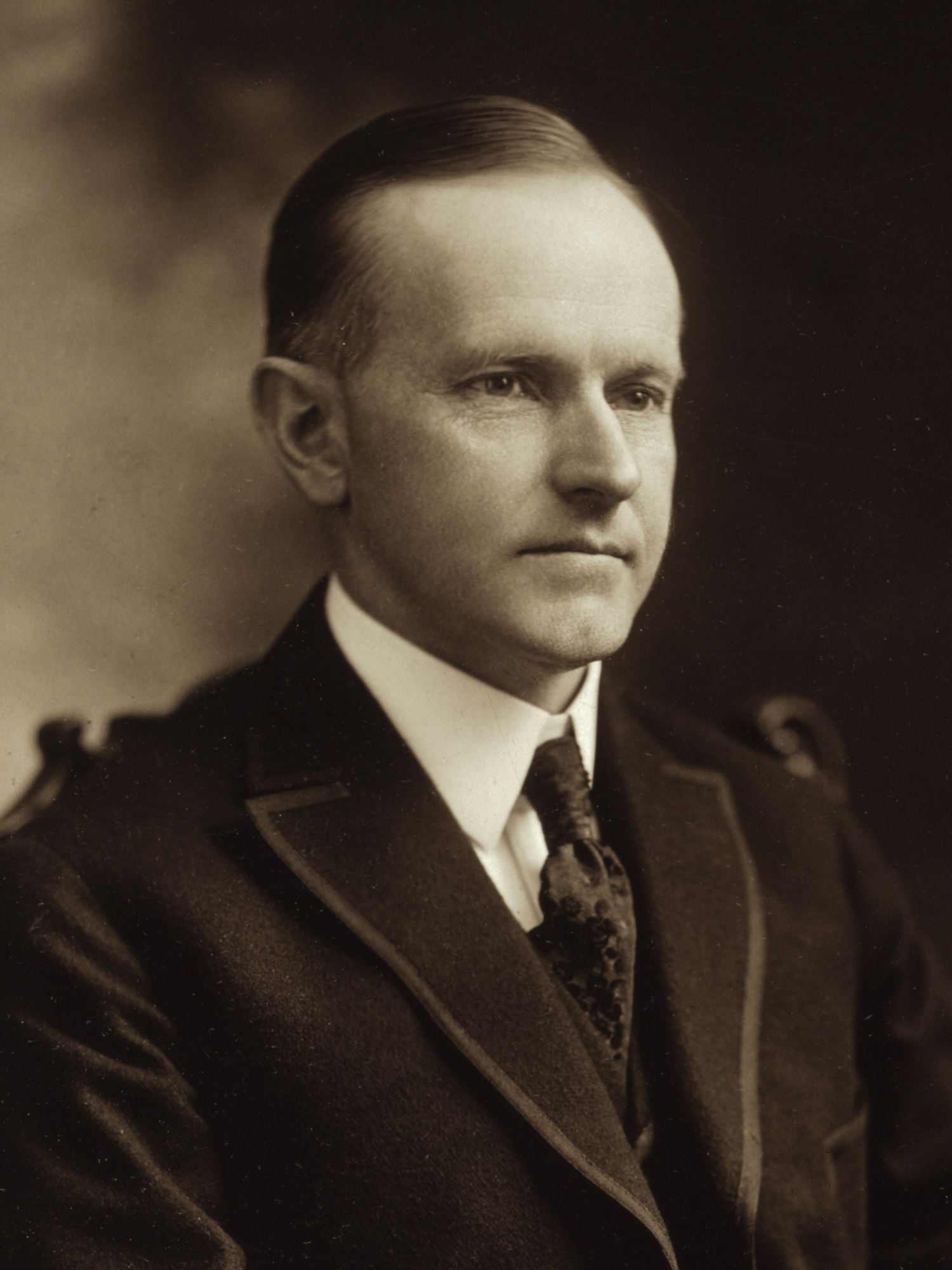
Calvin Coolidge, Senate president.

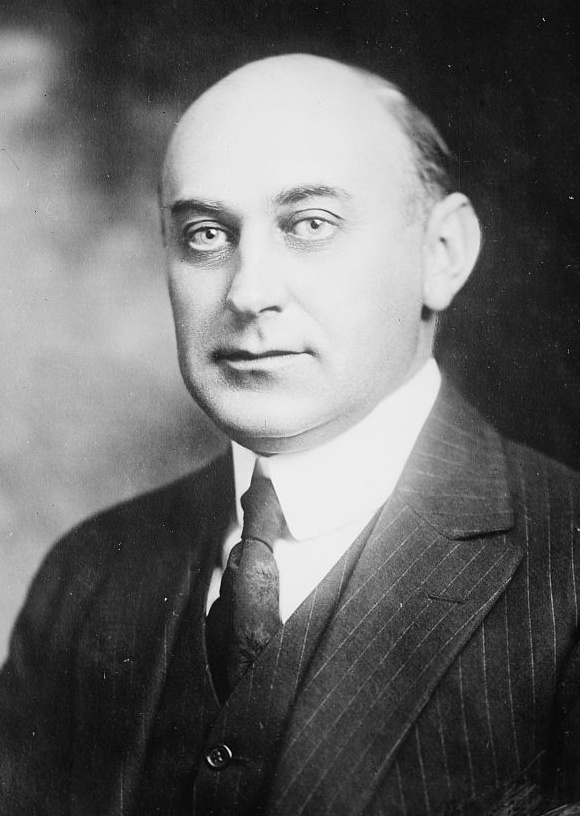
Channing Cox, House speaker.

Leaders of the Massachusetts General Court, 1915.

The 136th Massachusetts General Court, consisting of the Massachusetts Senate and the Massachusetts House of Representatives, met in 1915 during the governorship of David I. Walsh. Calvin Coolidge served as president of the Senate and Channing H. Cox served as speaker of the House.

== Senators ==
image	name	date of birth	district
	Edward C. R. Bagley		
	Frank Bartlett		
	Sanford Bates	July 17, 1884	9th Suffolk
	William A. L. Bazeley	1872	
	Charles Sumner Beal	August 14, 1856	
	James W. Bean	May 11, 1866	
	James F. Cavanagh		
	Ezra W. Clark	October 12, 1842	
	Calvin Coolidge	July 4, 1872	
	Herbert E. Cummings		
	Andrew P. Doyle	August 15, 1869	
	Charles W. Eldridge	October 16, 1877	
	George H. Ellis	October 3, 1848	
	Frank S. Farnsworth		
	Wilton B. Fay		
	Redmond S. Fitzgerald		
	Julius Garst		
	Charles L. Gifford	March 15, 1871	
	Gurdon W. Gordon		
	James I. Green	April 9, 1885	
	John W. Haigis	July 31, 1881	
	Martin Hays	October 14, 1876	
	Clarence Whitman Hobbs Jr.	October 1, 1878	
	George H. Jackson	March 9, 1865	
	Charles A. Kimball		
	Louis F. R. Langelier		
	Joseph Leonard		
	George Edward Marchand	December 22, 1877	
	Joseph W. Martin Jr.	November 3, 1884	
	Orion T. Mason		
	Philip J. McGonagle	October 21, 1871	
	Walter E. McLane		
	C. Augustus Norwood		
	E. Howard Perley		
	John F. Sheehan		
	William J. Sullivan	April 14, 1865	
	James R. Tetler	August 26, 1877	
	James P. Timilty	March 28, 1865	
	Nathan A. Tufts	April 15, 1879	
	Henry Gordon Wells	October 12, 1879	

== Representatives ==
image	name	date of birth	district
	Essex S. Abbott		
	Henry Achin Jr.	June 30, 1883	
	Austin Flint Adams		3rd Worcester
	J. Weston Allen	April 19, 1872	
	Charles H. Annis	January 12, 1869	
	William M. Armstrong	August 17, 1850	
	Harrison Henry Atwood	August 26, 1863	
	James T. Bagshaw		
	Samuel H. Bailey		
	Edmund Baker		
	Philip Hosmer Ball		
	Arthur W. Barker		
	Joseph L. Barry		
	William J. Barry	1861	
	Addison P. Beardsley		
	Joseph Belcher		
	Joseph J. Benson		
	Jacob Bitzer	January 16, 1865	
	Thomas William Blanchard		
	Alvin E. Bliss		
	Henry E. Bothfeld	March 4, 1859	
	Arthur Bower		
	Eden K. Bowser		
	Thomas H. Brennan		
	James J. Brennan	May 2, 1882	
	Fred Johnson Brown		
	Daniel J. Buckley		
	George Bunting	August 31, 1868	
	Frederic W. Burke		
	Arthur E. Burr		
	Frederick Butler		
	Fred E. Cady		
	Matthew J. Carbary		
	Julius F. Carman	August 7, 1861	
	Maurice Caro		
	Peter Carr	May 2, 1883	
	Andrew A. Casassa		
	Daniel W. Casey		
	Allison G. Catheron	June 26, 1878	
	George Dudley Chamberlain		
	Albert Minot Chandler		
	Edward Earl Chapman		
	John W. Churchill	November 17, 1853	
	A. Schuyler Clapp		
	Frederic F. Clauss		
	James Coffey	May 17, 1849	
	Arthur Willard Colburn	December 1, 1877	
	Benjamin G. Collins		
	Samuel I. Collins	March 4, 1851	
	D. Herbert Cook	June 2, 1851	
	Thomas J. Cooley		
	Michael H. Cotter		
	John J. Courtney		
	Walter D. Cowls		
	George H. Creighton		
	William N. Cronin		
	Burton H. Crosby		
	Fred Wilder Cross	September 15, 1868	
	John T. Crowley	November 15, 1872	
	Patrick J. Curley		
	George E. Curran		
	Edward J. Dailey		
	Samuel Davis	June 4, 1866	
	Ernest F. Davis		
	Theodore H. Day		
	William Abner Dodge		
	John F. Doherty	June 9, 1881	
	Peter J. Donaghue		
	William J. Donahoe		
	Joseph Joyce Donahue		
	John A. Donoghue		
	John L. Donovan	June 3, 1876	
	Thomas E. Dowd		
	Aaron Coolidge Dowse		
	George P. Drury		
	Dennis Francis Duggan		
	Frank B. Edgell		
	Carl C. Emery	November 4, 1888	
	Charles A. Ericson		
	John G. Faxon		
	Frederick B. Felton		
	Horace F. Field		
	Joseph La Flamme		
	Maurice R. Flynn	July 28, 1889	
	William J. Foley	March 2, 1887	
	Harry C. Foster	August 27, 1871	
	Harvey E. Frost	October 2, 1875	
	Charles Benjamin Frothingham	November 11, 1858	
	Alvan T. Fuller	February 27, 1878	
	Howard F. Furness		
	Charles F. Garrity		
	Harry C. Gates		
	Joseph S. Gates	October 3, 1856	
	John Mellen Gibbs		
	Thomas J. Giblin		
	John J. Gilbride		
	Joseph P. Good		
	Shirley P. Graves		
	Fred Parker Greenwood		
	Edgar H. Hall		
	John Halliwell	February 21, 1864	
	Edward F. Harrington (state representative)	August 10, 1878	
	James L. Harrop		
	George F. Hart	November 9, 1859	
	John F. Hatch Jr.		
	Matthew A. Higgins		
	Albert Holway		
	John C. Hull (politician)	November 1, 1870	
	Charles N. James	September 3, 1853	
	Victor Francis Jewett		
	John Joseph Kearney		
	Thomas R. Kelley		
	Jeremiah J. Kelly		
	William W. Kennard		
	Robert T. Kent		
	Richard Knowles		
	Joseph O. Knox		
	Louis LaDame		
	Arthur F. Lamb		
	Francis X. Le Boeuf		
	George B. Leonard		
	John N. Levins		
	Fred Oliver Lewis	June 12, 1878	
	E. Ellsworth Lincoln		
	George A. Lindberg		
	Martin Lomasney	December 3, 1859	
	Henry Follansbee Long		
	Frederick H. Lucke		
	James MacFarlane Lyle		
	Frank E. Lyman	September 15, 1866	
	John H. Lynch	October 28, 1884	
	Frederick William MacKenzie		
	James E. MacPherson		
	Frederick H. Magison		
	John P. Mahoney	May 26, 1888	
	Michael F. Malone		
	Frank A. Manning		
	Felix A. Marcella		
	John L. Mather		
	John Edwin Maybury		
	John Henry McAllister		
	John F. McCarthy		
	Charles H. McGlue		
	Joseph McGrath (American politician)	December 20, 1890	
	Orlando McKenzie		
	Jared B. McLane		
	Henry J. McLaughlin		
	Edward F. McLaughlin	June 6, 1883	
	William M. McMorrow		
	Michael J. McNamee		
	Samuel H. Mildram		
	John Mitchell	September 4, 1877	
	John L. Monahan		
	Wesley E. Monk	August 1, 1874	
	Alfred James Moore	August 7, 1891	
	Charles H. Morrill	October 6, 1874	
	Edward G. Morris		
	George D. Morse		
	Hugh E. Mullen		
	Thomas B. Mulvehill		
	Frank Mulveny		
	John J. Murphy	March 26, 1889	
	Dennis A. Murphy	September 26, 1876	
	Edward P. Murphy		
	James J. Murphy	February 11, 1885	
	Patrick E. Murray	August 22, 1869	
	David W. Murray	September 9, 1874	
	Ken Nash		
	Arthur N. Newhall		
	John P. Nickerson		
	Francis Norwood		
	Edward H. Nutting	July 6, 1869	
	James T. O'Dowd		
	Joseph A. Oakhem		
	Ambrose F. Ogden		
	John N. Osborne	January 28, 1853	
	James Goodridge Page		
	Peter C. Paradis		
	John H. Parker	August 27, 1859	
	Chauncey Pepin		
	Edward Howland Perry		
	Joseph H. Perry	May 4, 1869	
	Joseph C. Perry	May 1, 1856	
	Immanuel Pfeiffer Jr.		
	James E. Phelan	October 21, 1884	
	James Tracy Potter	January 26, 1870	
	Winfield F. Prime	November 22, 1860	
	Martin Lewis Quinn	January 19, 1862	
	Albert T. Quiry		
	George J. Rabouin		
	Cyril R. Read		
	Dennis F. Reardon		
	John J. Reilly		
	William C. Renne		
	Robert Robinson	January 4, 1889	
	William M. Robinson	July 21, 1875	
	Silas B. Root		
	Charles Freeman Rowley		
	G. Oscar Russell		
	Walter F. Russell		
	John D. Ryan	July 30, 1868	
	Edward Julius Sandberg	October 21, 1866	
	Alfred Santosuosso		
	Joseph A. Saunders		
	Roland D. Sawyer	January 8, 1874	
	C. Burnside Seagrave		
	John Francis Sheehan	August 25, 1879	
	John H. Sherburne	1877	
	Michael J. Sherry		
	Allston M. Sinnott		
	Jerome S. Smith		
	Fitz-Henry Smith Jr.		
	Ralph M. Smith		
	William O. Souther Jr.		
	Charles Elmer Stanwood		
	Joseph Fayette Stone	February 8, 1858	
	Merrill E. Streeter		
	Denis J. Sullivan	July 24, 1889	
	Lewis R. Sullivan		
	William H. Sullivan	February 20, 1869	
	John F. Sullivan	May 17, 1875	
	Edmond P. Talbot	1884	
	Warren E. Tarbell		
	James E. Tolman	November 8, 1867	
	George J. Wall		
	Joseph E. Warner	May 16, 1884	
	Robert M. Washburn	January 4, 1868	
	George B. Waterman		
	Samuel W. Weare		
	Thomas Weston Jr		
	Hartley L. White		
	George A. Whitney		
	Edgar H. Whitney		
	Herbert A. Wilson	November 27, 1870	
	Herbert Wing		
	Walter Edgar Wolfe		
	Harry C. Woodill		
	George M. Worrall		

== See also ==
- 1915 Massachusetts gubernatorial election
- 64th United States Congress
- List of Massachusetts General Courts
