= 1919 Massachusetts legislature =

140th Massachusetts General Court
←	139th	141st	→

Overview
- Legislative body: General Court

Senate
- Members: 40

House
- Members: 240

The 140th Massachusetts General Court, consisting of the Massachusetts Senate and the Massachusetts House of Representatives, met in 1919.

== Senators ==
image	name	date of birth	district
	John E. Beck	May 10, 1869	1st Suffolk
	Charles Donnell Brown	June 5, 1862	
	Edward Callahan		
	James F. Cavanagh		
	George Dudley Chamberlain		
	George B. Churchill	October 24, 1866	
	Arthur Willard Colburn	December 1, 1877	
	Edward A. Counihan Jr.		
	John Cronin		
	George E. Curran		
	John A. Curtin	April 3, 1870	
	Edward N. Dahlborg		
	Edward B. Eames	April 15, 1856	
	Samuel B. Finkel		
	William J. Foley	March 2, 1887	
	Charles L. Gifford	March 15, 1871	
	John Halliwell	February 21, 1864	
	Leonard F. Hardy		
	Walter A. Hardy	December 15, 1866	
	George A. Hastings		
	Clarence Whitman Hobbs Jr.	October 1, 1878	
	George H. Jackson	March 9, 1865	
	John Joseph Kearney		
	Joseph O. Knox		
	Augustus Peabody Loring	1856	
	John J. Mahoney	April 13, 1860	
	David Story McIntosh		
	Edwin T. McKnight	October 11, 1869	
	Walter E. McLane		
	Arthur L. Nason	October 24, 1872	
	Malcolm Nichols	May 8, 1876	
	Harold L. Perrin		
	Francis Prescott		
	Silas D. Reed		
	Charles Sumner Smith		
	Peter F. Sullivan	June 29, 1871	
	Warren E. Tarbell		
	John J. Walsh		
	Thomas Weston Jr		
	Charles A. Winchester		

== Representatives ==
image	name	date of birth	district
	Essex S. Abbott		
	Henry Achin Jr.	June 30, 1883	
	Joseph B. Aigen		
	Frank G. Allen	October 6, 1874	8th Norfolk
	Ernest William Allen		
	Seth Fenelon Arnold	December 21, 1878	
	Charles M. Austin	May 2, 1884	
	Josiah Babcock Jr.	May 21, 1880	
	James T. Bagshaw		
	John Henry Baker		
	Francis N. Balch	November 23, 1873	
	William B. Baldwin	September 18, 1854	
	George Storer Baldwin		
	Joseph L. Barry		
	Herbert Amiel Bartlett		
	George J. Bates	February 25, 1891	
	Thomas William Baxter		
	Arthur Enoch Beane		
	Addison P. Beardsley		
	Erastus T. Bearse		
	Alton Leroy Bellows		
	Chauncey A. Bennett		
	James D. Bentley	February 6, 1884	
	Alfred M. Bessette	March 25, 1876	
	Orlando C. Bidwell		
	Robert E. Bigney		
	Jacob Bitzer	January 16, 1865	
	Giles Blague		
	Alvin E. Bliss		
	Cornelius Boothman		
	Eden K. Bowser		
	Alfred Bradbury		
	Charles D. Bradbury		
	Albert C. Bray		
	Louis Adelard Breault		
	James Henry Brennan	December 21, 1888	
	Owen E. Brennen	September 26, 1868	
	Frank L. Brier		
	Elmer L. Briggs		
	Fred Johnson Brown		
	Edgar J. Buck		
	Maurice Allan Buck		
	William J. Bullock		
	George Bunting	August 31, 1868	
	Fred J. Burrell	March 12, 1889	
	George F. Butterick	August 16, 1855	
	John J. Carey	February 28, 1888	
	John B. Cashman		
	Mial W. Chase		
	Henry S. Clark		
	Frederic F. Clauss		
	Everett W. Coleman		
	Benjamin G. Collins		
	William S. Conroy	October 2, 1877	
	D. Herbert Cook	June 2, 1851	
	Harry A. Cooke		
	Charles L. Cooley		
	Thomas J. Corbett	May 10, 1883	
	Patrick M. Costello		
	Henry E. Cowdrey		
	Frank H. Cowin		
	Edward J. Cox		
	Samuel V. Crane	October 4, 1855	
	Warren Chapman Daggett	May 10, 1868	
	Leon Warren Davis		
	George L. Dawley		
	Henry Ellsworth Dean	September 29, 1862	
	Thomas F. Donovan	September 26, 1890	
	Lawrence F. Dowd		
	Andrew P. Doyle	August 15, 1869	
	Timothy J. Driscoll		
	Horace E. Durgin	December 4, 1863	
	Bernard Early		
	George R. Ellis	July 29, 1876	
	Joseph W. Ellsworth Jr.		
	Carl C. Emery	November 4, 1888	
	John P. Englert		
	Alfred C. Fairbanks		
	Philip J. Feinberg		
	John I. Fitzgerald	July 18, 1882	
	Michael A. Flanagan	February 21, 1890	
	William Fleming		
	Charles R. Foote	July 9, 1865	
	Robert T. Fowler		
	William J. Francis		
	Joseph E. Freeling		
	William P. French	April 30, 1874	
	Howard F. Furness		
	John Mellen Gibbs		
	Daniel J. Gillen		
	Frederick P. Glazier	September 27, 1859	
	Charles Waite Gould	May 8, 1891	
	William J. Granfield	December 18, 1889	
	Clarence H. Granger		
	Alfred A. Grant		
	Maurice F. Greaney		
	Thomas H. Green	May 11, 1883	
	Fred Parker Greenwood		
	Fred C. Haigis		
	Cornelius F. Haley	July 15, 1875	
	Leo Spotten Hamburger		
	John Otis Hamilton		
	Edward F. Harrington (state representative)	August 10, 1878	
	Charles H. Hartshorn		
	Daniel J. Hayden		
	James William Hayes		
	Walter Haynes		
	Martin Hays	October 14, 1876	
	William H. Hearn		
	Joseph E. Herrick		
	William P. Hickey	November 17, 1871	
	Matthew A. Higgins		
	Edward Carroll Hinckley		
	Edgar F. Howland		
	John Robert Hudson		
	George C. F. Hudson		
	John C. Hull (politician)	November 1, 1870	
	Victor Francis Jewett		
	William Louis Johnson	October 23, 1856	
	John G. Johnson	May 23, 1864	
	Arthur Westgate Jones	January 11, 1873	
	Benjamin Oliver Jones	July 28, 1882	
	Morris A. Jones		
	Michael H. Jordan	February 7, 1863	
	Thomas Martin Joyce		
	Jeremiah P. Keating		
	David H. Keedy		
	John A. Kelleher	March 14, 1856	
	Charles A. Kelley	March 24, 1862	
	David Leon Kelley	April 26, 1889	
	James J. Kelley		
	Davis B. Keniston		
	Clarence P. Kidder		
	James F. Kiernan	February 1, 1884	
	William Aiken Kneeland		
	Fred M. Knight		
	Wilfrid J. Lamoureux	December 13, 1869	
	Benjamin C. Lane		
	Ernest A. LaRocque		
	Thomas Leavitt		
	Luther B. Lyman	November 13, 1853	
	Frank E. Lyman	September 15, 1866	
	Lloyd Makepeace		
	Michael F. Malone		
	David J. Maloney		
	Frank A. Manning		
	William J. Manning		
	George S. Marsh	February 18, 1858	
	Arthur E. Marsh		
	Allan R. McDonald		
	William H. McDonnell	April 9, 1885	
	Francis P. McKeon		
	Francis B. McKinney		
	Frank McMahon	August 29, 1872	
	William Raymond McMenimen		
	James E. McVann		
	James J. Mellen	March 30, 1875	
	Walter L. Mellen	January 10, 1868	
	Patrick J. Melody		
	Bernard F. Merriam		
	Julius Meyers	December 6, 1854	
	John Mitchell	September 4, 1877	
	Wesley E. Monk	August 1, 1874	
	James G. Moran	May 2, 1870	
	J. Warren Moulton		
	James J. Moynihan		
	Frank Mulveny		
	James J. Mulvey		
	Daniel C. Murphy	December 14, 1887	
	John J. Murphy	March 26, 1889	
	William J. Naphen		
	Christian Nelson		
	John R. Nelson	November 22, 1871	
	Arthur N. Newhall		
	George H. Newhall	October 24, 1850	
	Frederic C. Nichols		
	Thomas A. Niland	June 11, 1873	
	William A. O'Brien		
	John D. O'Connor	May 7, 1886	
	Frank A. Oberti		
	James E. Odlin		
	William W. Ollendorff		
	John Glenn Orr	February 27, 1857	
	John N. Osborne	January 28, 1853	
	Chauncey Pepin		
	Frank B. Phinney		
	Frederick Everett Pierce	May 5, 1862	
	William Plattner		
	Leland Powers		
	Frank H. Putnam		
	Timothy F. Quinn		
	Arthur K. Reading		
	Dennis F. Reardon		
	Michael J. Reidy		
	Abbott B. Rice		
	George Louis Richards		
	James W. Robertson		
	Arthur W. Robinson		
	Morrill S. Ryder		
	Harry R. Sackett		
	Roland D. Sawyer	January 8, 1874	
	William I. Schell		
	Edward A. Scigliano		
	Michael F. Shaw	September 12, 1865	
	Fitz-Henry Smith Jr.		
	Jerome S. Smith		
	Dexter Avery Snow	January 3, 1890	
	Burgess H. Spinney		
	William L. Stedman		
	Emil K. Steele		
	Elihu D. Stone		
	Charles Symonds		
	Edward Willis Taylor		
	John Thomas	January 27, 1859	
	Frank A. Torrey	December 21, 1874	
	James A. Torrey	September 27, 1868	
	Walter L. Tower		
	Charles L. Underhill	July 20, 1867	
	Albert P. Wadleigh		
	Albert T. Wall		
	Joseph E. Warner	May 16, 1884	
	George M. Webber		
	George Pearl Webster	January 9, 1877	
	Wellington Wells	April 18, 1868	
	Joseph W. Wharton		
	Bion Thomas Wheeler		
	Renton Whidden		
	John Addison White	August 8, 1859	
	Albert L. Whitman		
	James H. Wilkins		
	Herbert Francis Winn		
	Carlton Walen Wonson		
	Isaac U. Wood		
	William H. Woodhead	September 17, 1860	
	Harry C. Woodill		
	Benjamin H. Woodsum		
	George M. Worrall		
	Samuel H. Wragg	June 9, 1882	
	Elwin Temple Wright		
	Benjamin Loring Young	1885	

== See also ==
- 1919 Massachusetts gubernatorial election
- 66th United States Congress
- List of Massachusetts General Courts
