= Senator Tolman =

Senator Tolman may refer to:

- James E. Tolman (1867–1956), Massachusetts State Senate
- Steven Tolman (born 1954), Massachusetts State Senate
- Warren Tolman (born 1959), Massachusetts State Senate
