= Edwin T. McKnight =

American politician (1869–1935)

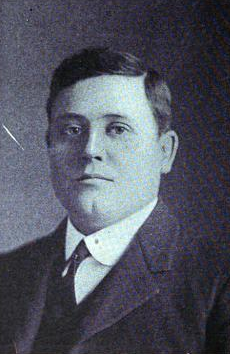

President of the Massachusetts Senate
- In office 1919–1920
- Preceded by: Henry Gordon Wells
- Succeeded by: Frank G. Allen

Member of the Massachusetts Senate Sixth Middlesex District
- Incumbent
- Assumed office January 8, 1918

Member of the Massachusetts House of Representatives 21st Suffolk District
- In office 1906–1907

Member of the Boston Common Council
- In office 1903–1905

Personal details
- Born: October 11, 1869 Kings County, New Brunswick
- Died: July 14, 1935 (aged 65) Medford, Massachusetts, U.S.
- Party: Republican
- Education: Fredericton, N. B. Normal School; University of New Brunswick, Harvard Law School

Edwin T. McKnight (1869–1935) was a politician who served on the Boston City Council, in the Massachusetts House of Representatives; and as a member, and President of, the Massachusetts Senate.

== Early life ==
McKnight was born on October 11, 1869, in Kings County, New Brunswick.

== Education ==
McKnight attended Fredericton, N. B. Normal School; the University of New Brunswick, and Harvard Law School

== See also ==
- 1917 Massachusetts legislature
- 1918 Massachusetts legislature
- 1919 Massachusetts legislature
- 1920 Massachusetts legislature

Political offices
Preceded by Henry Gordon Wells	President of the Massachusetts Senate; 1919-1920	Succeeded by Frank G. Allen
