= Joseph McGrath (American politician) =

American politician (1890–1943)

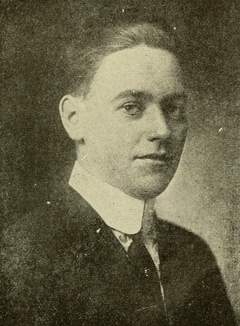
portrait photograph, circa 1919

Joseph McGrath (December 20, 1890 – April 25, 1943) was an American politician who served as acting Mayor of Boston during the tenure of James Michael Curley, Chairman of the Massachusetts Democratic Party, and Collector of Customs for the Port of Boston.

== Early life and career ==
McGrath was born on December 20, 1890, in Boston. He graduated from Dorchester High School. While still in high school, McGrath became involved in local politics. At the age of 25 he was elected to the Massachusetts House of Representatives. He served four terms in the state legislature. In 1926 he married Doris E. Pearson of Dorchester. Outside politics McGrath worked in real estate.

== City Council ==
McGrath, circa 1925

In 1926, McGrath moved to local politics when he was elected to the Boston City Council. In 1931 and 1933 he was elected council president. As council president, McGrath served as acting mayor when James Michael Curley was out of the city. His longest stretch as acting Mayor occurred in 1931 when Curley went abroad for six weeks.

== Party chairman ==
In January 1935, McGrath was named Chairman of the Massachusetts Democratic Party. Although he was a political lieutenant of James Michael Curley, he was accepted by other leaders of the Democratic Party because he worked devotedly for the entire ticket. McGrath's impartiality upset Curley because he expected McGrath to use his influence to help him win the 1936 senatorial election. As chairman, McGrath supported open meetings of the Democratic State Committee and allowed the press to be admitted to some of the meetings. Under his leadership, the Massachusetts Democratic Party built up the best organization they had ever had to that point and by the time of his departure only a few towns remained unorganized. When national committeeman Joseph B. Ely came out against the New Deal, McGrath resisted the demands of some state committee members to remove him from office, as McGrath hoped that Ely would still support the ticket in the 1936 election. Ely, however, would join the American Liberty League and support Republican Alf Landon for President.

== Collector of Customs ==
In 1938, McGrath was appointed Collector of Customs for the Port of Boston. He held this position until his unexpected death on April 25, 1943, at his home in Dorchester. His funeral was attended by a number of dignitaries, including Francis X. Hurley, David I. Walsh, John W. McCormack, James Michael Curley, Philip J. Philbin, Thomas A. Flaherty, Edmund J. Brandon, John F. Fitzgerald, Joseph Timilty, Thomas J. Buckley, William H. Burke, Jr., and Maurice J. Tobin.

== See also ==
- 1915 Massachusetts legislature
- 1916 Massachusetts legislature
- 1917 Massachusetts legislature
- 1918 Massachusetts legislature

Political offices
Preceded by William G. Lynch; Edward M. Gallagher	President of the Boston City Council; 1931; 1933	Succeeded by Edward M. Gallagher; John F. Dowd
Party political offices
Preceded by Charles H. McGlue	Chairman of the Massachusetts Democratic Party; 1935–1939	Succeeded by William H. Burke, Jr.
Government offices
Preceded by Joseph A. Maynard	Collector of Customs for the Port of Boston; 1938–1943	Succeeded by William H. Burke, Jr.
