= Charles L. Underhill =

American politician

Charles Lee Underhill
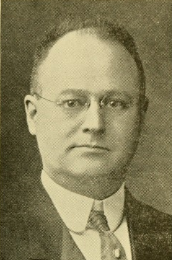

Member of the U.S. House of Representatives from Massachusetts's 9th district
- In office March 4, 1921 – March 3, 1933
- Preceded by: Alvan T. Fuller
- Succeeded by: Robert Luce

Member of the Massachusetts House of Representatives
- In office 1902–1903; 1908–1913; 1917–1918

Personal details
- Born: July 20, 1867 Richmond, Virginia
- Died: January 28, 1946 (aged 78) New York, New York
- Party: Republican

Charles Lee Underhill (July 20, 1867 – January 28, 1946) was a United States representative and anti-suffrage activist from Massachusetts. He was born in Richmond, Virginia on July 20, 1867. He moved to Massachusetts in 1872 with his parents, who settled in Somerville. He attended the common schools, was office boy, coal teamster, and a blacksmith. He subsequently engaged in the manufacture and sale of hardware in that city.

Underhill served in the Massachusetts House of Representatives (1902-1903 and 1908-1913), and was a member of the State constitutional convention in 1917 and 1918.

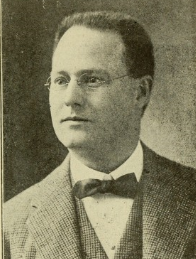
Underhill as a young state Representative

Underhill was opposed to women voting. He was a state delegate of the Men's Association Opposed to Woman Suffrage to Washington DC in 1913.

However, he held an opposite stance for the Philippines which was then an American territory. He filed a bill in the Congress proposing that Filipina women be allowed to vote in the colony. Filipina suffragists were suspicious of the bill which they believe is a dangerous precedent of Americans interfering on Philippine affairs.

He was elected as a Republican to the Sixty-seventh and to the five succeeding Congresses (March 4, 1921 – March 3, 1933). He was chairman of the Committee on Claims (Sixty-ninth and Seventieth Congresses) and the Committee on Accounts (Seventy-first Congress). He was not a candidate for renomination to the Seventy-third Congress. He then engaged in real estate development in Washington, D.C. from 1933 until he retired in 1941. Underhill died in New York City on January 28, 1946. His interment was in Mount Auburn Cemetery in Cambridge, Massachusetts.

== See also ==
- 1918 Massachusetts legislature
- 1919 Massachusetts legislature

U.S. House of Representatives
Preceded by Alvan T. Fuller	Member of the U.S. House of Representatives from Massachusetts's 9th congressional district March 4, 1921 – March 3, 1933	Succeeded by Robert Luce
