= John A. Hirsch =

American politician from Massachusetts

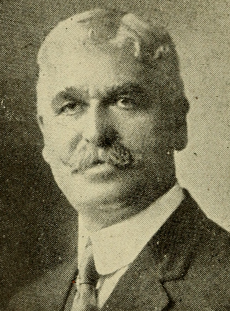
John Hirsch

John A. Hirsch (July 9, 1861 – November 29, 1938) was a Republican member of the Massachusetts House of Representatives from Dedham, Massachusetts. He was born in Norwood, Massachusetts on July 9, 1861. He died November 29, 1938, and was buried from the Allin Congregational Church.

== See also ==
- 1916 Massachusetts legislature
- 1917 Massachusetts legislature
- 1918 Massachusetts legislature
