= Henry Gordon Wells =

American politician (1879-1954)

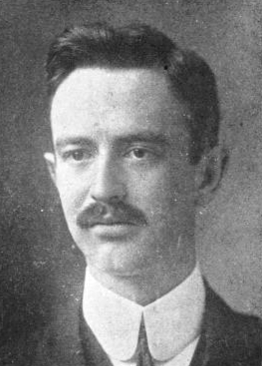

President of the Massachusetts Senate
- In office January 1916 – January 1919
- Preceded by: Calvin Coolidge
- Succeeded by: Edwin T. McKnight

Member of the Massachusetts Senate 4th Essex District
- In office January 1913 – January 1919

District Attorney of Essex County, Massachusetts
- In office 1918–1920
- Preceded by: Louis Cox
- Succeeded by: S. Howard Donnell

Member of the Massachusetts House of Representatives 3rd Essex District
- In office 1910–1912

Personal details
- Born: October 12, 1879 Bridgeport, Connecticut
- Died: March 5, 1954 (aged 74) Haverhill, Massachusetts
- Party: Republican
- Spouse: Edith Weeks Burke
- Education: Wesleyan University; Harvard Law School
- Profession: Lawyer

Henry Gordon Wells (October 12, 1879 – March 5, 1954) was a lawyer and a Republican politician in Massachusetts and New Hampshire.

== Family life ==
Wells was born on October 12, 1879, in Bridgeport, Connecticut, to George Henry and Hannah Ada (Taylor) Wells. He attended public schools in Haverhill, Massachusetts. He graduated from Tilton Seminary, now known as Tilton School, in New Hampshire in 1898, from Wesleyan University in 1902, and from Harvard Law School in 1905. On April 18, 1906, he married Edith Weeks Burke of Middletown, Connecticut, with whom he had five children: Chester T., Elizabeth W., Archer G., Eleanor E., and Henry G.

== Private law practice ==
In 1905 he began his law practice in Haverhill, Massachusetts, with the office of Poor & Fuller (later Poor & Abbott), until he opened his own practice (Wells & Hale) in 1907. In addition to practicing law, he was a trustee of the Haverhill YWCA, member of the City Hospital Aid Association, Vice President of the Haverhill Boys Club, and director of the Haverhill YMCA.

== Essex County district attorney ==
In 1918, Wells was appointed Essex County district attorney, succeeding Louis Cox. Wells was the district attorney during the locally famous case of Elizabeth M. Skeels, alias, indicted in Essex County, Massachusetts, in September 1918 for the murder of Florence Webster Gay in Andover on December 10, 1917. Skeels was accused of administering arsenic while acting as Gay's nurse. She was arraigned on November 1, 1918, and pleaded not guilty. Daniel J. Daley, Esq., appeared as counsel for the defendant. In June 1919 the defendant was tried by jury before Judge Webster Thayer. The result was a verdict of not guilty. The case was in charge of Hon. Henry Converse Atwill, Attorney-General, and District Attorney Henry G. Wells.

Vincenzo Issarella was indicted in Essex County, May 2, 1918, for the murder of Vito Rocco in Haverhill on February 10, 1918. He was arraigned May 28, 1918, and pled not guilty. William J. MacDonald, Esq., appeared as counsel for the defendant. On February 14, 1919, the defendant retracted his former plea, and pled guilty to manslaughter. This plea was accepted by the Commonwealth, and the defendant was sentenced to State Prison for a term of not more than fifteen nor less than thirteen years. The case was in charge of District Attorney Henry G. Wells.

Peter DiZazzo was indicted in Essex County in May 1918, for the murder of Tony Volenti in Lawrence, Massachusetts, on February 19, 1918. He was arraigned May 29, 1918, and pled not guilty. Hon. W. Scott Peters and Ralph A. A. Comparone Esq., appeared as counsel for the defendant. On May 1, 1919, an entry of nolle prosequi was made against this indictment. The case was in charge of District Attorney Henry G. Wells.

Victor Verier was indicted in Essex County in January 1919, for the murder of Elizabeth Verier in Lawrence on December 14, 1918. On October 24, 1919, the defendant was adjudged insane and was committed to Bridgewater State Hospital until further order of the court. The case was in charge of District Attorney Henry G. Wells.

Wells ran for a full term, but was defeated in the Republican primary by S. Howard Donnell.

== Government appointments and elected positions ==
In 1907 Wells became a member of the Haverhill, Massachusetts Common Council. He served as an elected member of the Massachusetts House of Representatives from 1910 to 1912, serving on committees on insurance as clerk and chairman, election laws, and congressional redistricting. Wells then served on Massachusetts Senate from 1913 to 1918, becoming "the powerful and respected" President of the Massachusetts Senate in 1916 succeeding Calvin Coolidge. In 1915, Wells served on the Committee on Public Lighting, Committee on Rules, and Committee on Railroads. During his time in the Senate, he was the only senator to always vote no on a woman's right to vote. He also served for a dozen years or more as a member of the Massachusetts Department of Public Utilities serving as commissioner in 1925 and was a past president of the National Association of Railroad and Utility Commissioners.

== Career in New Hampshire ==
He later moved to Newton, New Hampshire, where he also served in the legislature and was a delegate to the New Hampshire state constitutional convention in 1948. He was ultimately named to the New Hampshire Public Utilities Commission.

== See also ==
- 1915 Massachusetts legislature
- 1916 Massachusetts legislature
- 1917 Massachusetts legislature
- 1918 Massachusetts legislature
