= S. Howard Donnell =

American lawyer and politician (1881-1952)

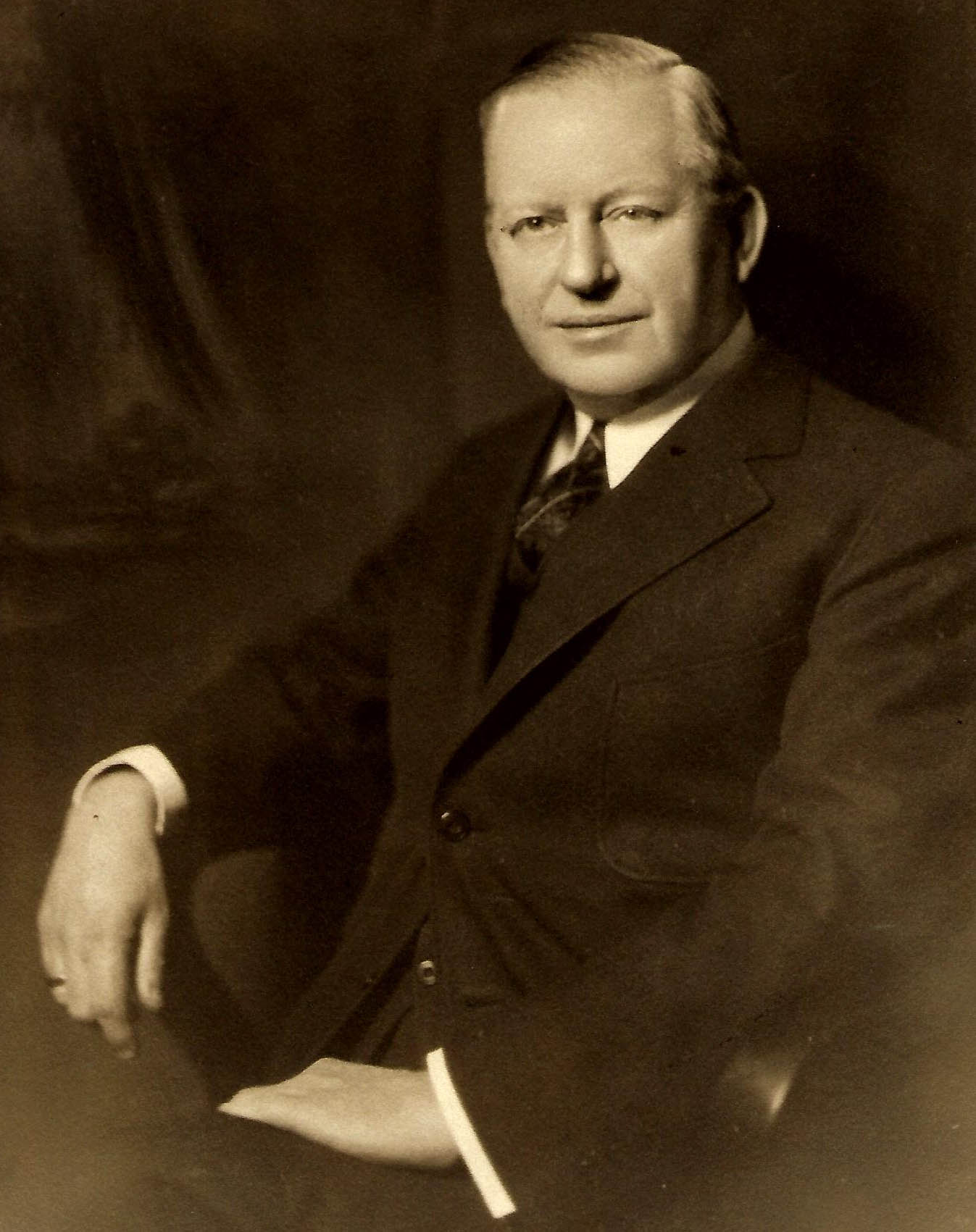

Member of the Massachusetts Governor's Council from the 5th District
- In office 1944–1945
- Preceded by: William H. McSweeney
- Succeeded by: Robert V. O'Sullivan

District Attorney of Essex County, Massachusetts
- In office 1920–1923
- Preceded by: Henry G. Wells
- Succeeded by: William G. Clark

Mayor of Peabody, Massachusetts
- In office 1916–1920
- Preceded by: Position created
- Succeeded by: William A. Shea

Personal details
- Born: March 21, 1881 Peabody, Massachusetts, U.S.
- Died: November 28, 1952 (aged 71) Peabody, Massachusetts, U.S.
- Resting place: Cedar Grove Cemetery; Peabody, Massachusetts
- Party: Republican
- Education: Boston University School of Law
- Occupation: Attorney

Samuel Howard Donnell (March 21, 1881 – November 28, 1952) was an American lawyer and politician who was the first mayor of Peabody, Massachusetts and was district attorney of Essex County, Massachusetts.

== Early life ==
Donnell was born on March 21, 1881, in Peabody. He graduated from Peabody High School and worked in local tanneries to finance his education at the Boston University School of Law. He was admitted to the bar in 1902.

== Municipal offices ==
Donnell was elected town solicitor in 1904. From 1905 to 1911 he was a member of the Peabody school committee. In 1912 he was elected town moderator. When Peabody switched to a city to a city charter, Donnell won the city's first mayoral election. He served as mayor from 1916 to 1920. As mayor, Donnell lowered the city's tax rate and launched a $700,000 highway and sidewalk construction project.

== District attorney ==
In 1919, Donnell was elected Essex County District Attorney after he upset incumbent DA Henry G. Wells in the Republican primary.

In 1921, Donnell ordered the exhumation of Edward Francis Searles after he received an anonymous letter alleging Searles had been poisoned. Searles' doctor told Donnell that although Searles had suffered from symptoms that could be attributed arsenic poisoning in the days preceding his death, he believed Searles had died of natural causes. Although Donnell believed that there wasn't enough evidence to believe that Searles had been poisoned, "there can be on real objection to an autopsy that will set at rest all rumors". On February 10, 1922, Donnell announced that the investigation had found that Searles had died from natural causes.

In 1922, Donnell sought the Republican nomination for Massachusetts Attorney General rather than running for reelection. He finished a distant third in the primary, which was won by Jay R. Benton.

== Legal career ==
After leaving office, Donnell practiced law in Peabody. In 1932 he represented the stockholders of the defunct Salem Trust Company in equity proceedings brought by the state bank commissioner. The case went to the Massachusetts Supreme Judicial Court, where justice John Crawford Crosby entered a final decree ordering the bank's officers and directors to pay the institution's obligations with interest. John A. Deery, the president of Salem Trust, pleaded guilty to 15 counts of accepting fictitious obligations and 10 counts of making loans to individuals known to be insolvent. He was sentenced to one year in the House of Correction.

In 1933, Donnell and Bart J. Ronan represented Dr. Harris S. Pomeroy, a physician who attended to Peabody firefighter William J. Costello before his unexpected death. Jessie Costello was charged with her husband's murder, but was found not guilty.

In 1939, Donnell secured an attachment on Peabody City Hall after the city failed to pay judgments to three of Donnell's clients. The auction of city hall was avoided when Mayor Joseph B. O'Keefe ordered the judgment to be paid off.

In 1941 he defended Emelian Kucher, a Peabody leather worker who was sued for alienation by his daughter-in-law. Anne Kucher accused Emelian Kucher of causing his son John, whose whereabouts were unknown, to leave her. The court found in favor of the defense.

== Massachusetts Governor's Council ==
In 1944, Governor Leverett Saltonstall appointed Donnell succeed the deceased William H. McSweeney on the Massachusetts Governor's Council. He ran as a write-in candidate for the Republican nomination in that year's election, but lost in the primary to Washington Cook.

== Death ==
Donnell died on November 28, 1952, after suffering a heart attack in his Peabody Square office. He was survived by his wife and three children. He was buried in Cedar Grove Cemetery in Peabody.
