= Harry C. Foster =

American politician

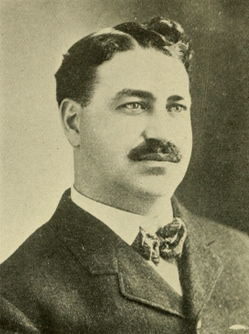
- Foster c. 1915

Member of the Massachusetts Senate
- In office 1902–1903
- Preceded by: Augustus P. Gardner
- Succeeded by: Moody Kimball

Mayor of Gloucester, Massachusetts
- In office 1912–1915
- Preceded by: Isaac Patch
- Succeeded by: C. Homer Barrett

Member of the Massachusetts House of Representatives
- In office 1898–1898
- Preceded by: Joseph W. Stocker
- Constituency: 19th Essex district
- In office 1915–1916
- Preceded by: Patrick H. Boyle
- Succeeded by: James E. Tolman
- Constituency: 21st Essex district

Personal details
- Born: August 27, 1871 Swampscott, Massachusetts
- Died: March 5, 1917 (aged 45) Seward, Alaska
- Party: Republican
- Education: Massachusetts Institute of Technology
- Occupation: Civil engineer

Harry Choate Foster (August 27, 1871 – March 5, 1917) was an American politician who served as a member of the Massachusetts General Court and as mayor of Gloucester, Massachusetts. He was expelled from the Massachusetts House of Representatives in 1916 for conduct unbecoming a member of the General Court after he collected money from people interested in pending legislation.

== Early life ==
Foster was born on August 27, 1871, in Swampscott, Massachusetts. He graduated from Gloucester High School and the Massachusetts Institute of Technology. He worked as a civil engineer and was employed for a time by the Boston Elevated Railway Company.

== Political career ==
From 1898 to 1901, Foster was chairman of the Gloucester Republican City Committee. He was a member of the party's state committee from 1900 to 1901. Foster was first elected to the Massachusetts House of Representatives in 1898. From 1902 to 1903 he was a member of the Massachusetts Senate. He represented the 3rd Essex District, which consisted of Essex, Gloucester, Hamilton, Ipswich, Manchester, Newbury, Newburyport, Rockport, Rowley, and Wenham. During his second term a Senate committee found Foster guilty of indiscreet, imprudent, and injurious conduct, but no action was taken. He then served as Mayor of Gloucester from 1912 to 1915. In 1915, Foster returned to the Massachusetts House of Representatives.

=== Expulsion ===
On March 1, 1916, State Representative James M. Lyle appeared before the Legislative Committee on Roads and Bridges and accused Foster of collecting money to be used for lobbying a bill compelling the city of Gloucester and the town of Rockport to contribute about $90,000 towards the construction of a new highway through the legislature. Lyle reiterated his accusation at a session later that afternoon and added that he wanted the matter investigated and that he would present evidence at the proper time. Foster admitted to collecting money, but claimed that it was used to employ counsel on behalf of the bill. On March 3, the House voted in favor of two similar resolutions introduced by Lyle and Foster asking for an investigation of Foster by the Rules Committee. On March 16, the Rules Committee recommended to the House that Foster be expelled. In its report to the House, the committee wrote that "by collecting money from persons he knew interested in legislation before said General Court... in the manner and under the circumstances set forth in evidence... is guilty of conduct unbecoming a member of the General Court and guilty of such conduct that it demands his expulstion from said body as a member." On March 17, the House voted in favor of expelling Foster by a voice vote.

Foster would be the last member of the Massachusetts House to be expelled until Carlos Henriquez's expulsion on February 6, 2014.

== Death ==
Foster died on March 5, 1917, in Seward, Alaska, of apoplexy. His body was sent to Gloucester, where it arrived on March 22. The funeral was held on March 25 at the Magnolia Congressional Church.

== See also ==
- 1915 Massachusetts legislature
- 1916 Massachusetts legislature
