= Edward F. McLaughlin =

American politician (1883-1953)

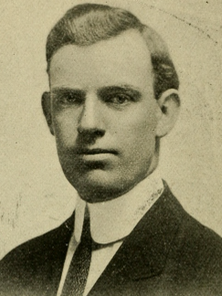
- McLaughlin c. 1915

Boston Fire Commissioner
- In office 1934–1938
- Preceded by: Eugene M. McSweeney
- Succeeded by: William Arthur Reilly
- In office 1930–1933
- Preceded by: Eugene Hultman
- Succeeded by: Eugene M. McSweeney

Member of the Massachusetts Senate from the 4th Suffolk District
- In office 1916–1918
- Preceded by: Joseph Leonard
- Succeeded by: John J. Kearney

Member of the Massachusetts House of Representatives from the 12th Suffolk District
- In office 1913–1915

Personal details
- Born: Edward Francis McLaughlin; June 6, 1883 Boston
- Died: January 28, 1953 (aged 69) Boston

Edward Francis McLaughlin (June 6, 1883 – January 28, 1953) was an American politician from Boston.

== Early life ==
McLaughlin was born on June 6, 1883, in Boston's South End. He graduated from Rice Grammar School in 1898 and Mechanics Arts High School in 1901.

== Political career ==
=== Massachusetts General Court ===
From 1913 to 1915, McLaughlin represented the 12th Suffolk District in the Massachusetts House of Representatives. From 1916 to 1918 he represented the 4th Suffolk District in the Massachusetts Senate.

=== City of Boston ===
In 1918, McLaughlin was elected to the Boston City Council. He chose not to run for reelection in 1921, but remained involved in politics as chairman of the Democratic City Committee and as a state committeeman.

In 1930, McLaughlin was appointed fire commissioner by Mayor James Michael Curley. In October 1933, McLaughlin resigned in order to support Frederick Mansfield for Mayor. Mansfield won the election and McLaughlin returned to the position of fire commissioner in January 1934. McLaughlin resigned in January 1938 and became involved in the insurance and road construction industries. In 1941, he returned to city government as street commissioner under Mayor Maurice J. Tobin. He later served as the city's Federal relations secretary until 1945.

== Personal life and death ==
McLaughlin and his wife had five children, one of whom, Edward F. McLaughlin Jr., followed his father into politics. In 1926, the family moved from the South End to Jamaica Plain.

McLaughlin died on January 28, 1953, in Boston.

== See also ==
- 1915 Massachusetts legislature
- 1916 Massachusetts legislature
- 1917 Massachusetts legislature
- 1918 Massachusetts legislature
