= Charles L. Gifford =

American politician (1871-1947)

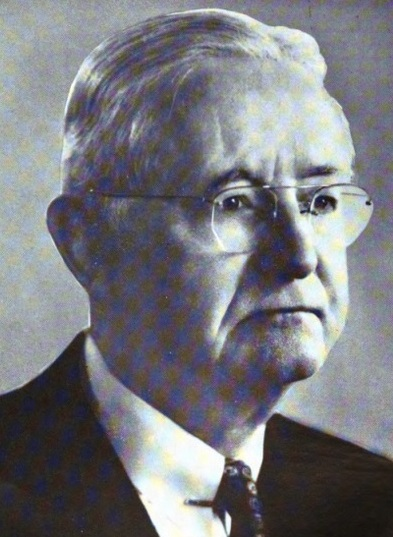

Member of the U.S. House of Representatives from Massachusetts
- In office November 7, 1922 – August 23, 1947
- Preceded by: Joseph Walsh
- Succeeded by: Donald W. Nicholson
- Constituency: 16th district (1922–33); 15th district (1933–43); 9th district (1943–47)

Member of the Massachusetts Senate
- In office 1914–1919

Member of the Massachusetts House of Representatives
- In office 1912–1913

Personal details
- Born: Charles Laceille Gifford; March 15, 1871 Cotuit, Massachusetts, US
- Died: August 23, 1947 (aged 76) Cotuit, Massachusetts, US
- Party: Republican
- Occupation: Schoolteacher; Businessman

Charles Laceille Gifford (March 15, 1871 – August 23, 1947) was a United States representative from Massachusetts He was born in Cotuit on March 15, 1871. Through his father he was a descendant of Robert Pike, George Phillips, Richard Saltonstall and William Phelps, through his mother he was a descendant of John Humphrey, Thomas Hastings (colonist) and the Quaker Christopher Holder. Gifford attended the common schools and taught in Massachusetts and Connecticut from 1890 to 1900. He later engaged in the real estate business on Cape Cod as the owner of several summer cottages rented by vacationers and the operator of the Cotuit Inn. Gifford then became interested in oyster raising as president of the Cotuit Oyster Company and in cranberry farming.

He was elected a member of the Massachusetts House of Representatives (1912–1913) and served in the Massachusetts State Senate (1914–1919).

He was elected as a Republican to the Sixty-seventh Congress to fill the vacancy caused by the resignation of Joseph Walsh and, the same day, was elected to the Sixty-eighth Congress. He was reelected to the Sixty-ninth and to the eleven succeeding Congresses and served from November 7, 1922, to his death. He was chairman of the Committee on Elections No. 3 (Sixty-ninth and Seventieth Congresses) and the Committee on Election of President, Vice President, and Representatives (Seventy-first Congress). He was in favor of helping Great Britain during World War II before American entry into the war. This was the issue on which he ran in the 1940 House election, his opponent was isolationist Democrat George F. Backus who was outspokenly antisemitic and anti-British. Gifford countered by being outspokenly pro-British and denouncing antisemitism. Gifford voted in favor of the 1941 Lend Lease Act.

Gifford died in Cotuit on August 23, 1947, and was buried in Cotuit's Mosswood Cemetery.

== See also ==
- 1915 Massachusetts legislature
- 1916 Massachusetts legislature
- 1917 Massachusetts legislature
- 1918 Massachusetts legislature
- 1919 Massachusetts legislature
- List of members of the United States Congress who died in office (1900–1949)

U.S. House of Representatives
Preceded by Joseph Walsh	Member of the U.S. House of Representatives from Massachusetts's 16th congressional district November 7, 1922 – March 3, 1933	Succeeded by District eliminated
Preceded by Joseph William Martin Jr.	Member of the U.S. House of Representatives from Massachusetts's 15th congressional district March 4, 1933 – January 3, 1943	Succeeded by District eliminated
Preceded by Thomas H. Eliot	Member of the U.S. House of Representatives from Massachusetts's 9th congressional district January 3, 1943 – August 23, 1947	Succeeded by Donald W. Nicholson
