= George Bunting (Massachusetts politician) =

American politician (1868–1940)

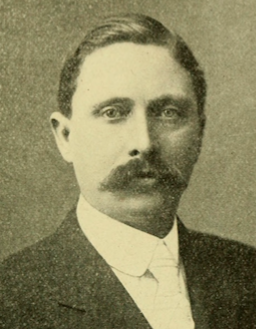
- George Bunting in 1908

Member of the Massachusetts House of Representatives
- In office 1907–1919

Personal details
- Born: August 31, 1868
- Died: September 11, 1940 (aged 72)

George Bunting (born August 31, 1868 – September 11, 1940) was an American politician. He was a member the Massachusetts House of Representatives from 1907 to 1919.

== See also ==
- 1907 Massachusetts legislature
- 1908 Massachusetts legislature
- 1909 Massachusetts legislature
- 1910 Massachusetts legislature
- 1915 Massachusetts legislature
- 1917 Massachusetts legislature
- 1918 Massachusetts legislature
- 1919 Massachusetts legislature
