= Edward F. Harrington (state representative) =

American politician (1878–1951)

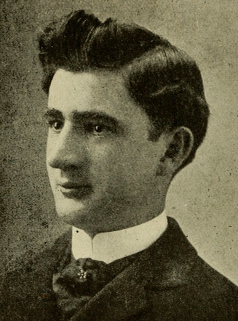

City Manager of Fall River, Massachusetts
- In office 1929–1931
- Preceded by: Position created
- Succeeded by: J. Walter Ackerman

Minority leader of the Massachusetts House of Representatives
- In office 1921–1924

Member of the Massachusetts House of Representatives from the 10th Bristol District
- In office 1909–1924
- Succeeded by: Joseph L. Hurley

Personal details
- Born: August 10, 1878 Fall River, Massachusetts
- Died: January 16, 1951 (aged 72) Fall River, Massachusetts
- Party: Democratic

Edward F. Harrington (1878–1951) was an American politician who served as a member of the Massachusetts House of Representatives and was city manager of Fall River, Massachusetts.

== Early life ==
Harrington was born on August 10, 1878, in Fall River, Massachusetts. He attended parochial school and afterwards engaged in the business of real estate.

== Political career ==
In 1902, Harrington served on the Fall River city council. From 1903 to 1908, he was a member of the city's board of aldermen. From 1909 to 1924 he represented the 10th Bristol District in the Massachusetts House of Representatives. In 1921 he was elected Democratic house floor leader. From 1924 to 1928 he was the City Clerk of Fall River. In January 1929 he became Fall River's first ever city manager. In 1930 he announced that he would not be a candidate for reappointment and was succeeded by former Watertown, New York, manager J. Walter Ackerman.

== Death ==
Harrington died on January 16, 1951, in Fall River. He was survived by his wife, a son, and three daughters. His grandson Edward F. Harrington served as United States Attorney for the District of Massachusetts and as a Judge for the United States District Court for the District of Massachusetts. Another grandson, John T. Harrington, was the Dean of Tufts University School of Medicine from 1995 - 2002.

== See also ==
- 1915 Massachusetts legislature
- 1916 Massachusetts legislature
- 1917 Massachusetts legislature
- 1918 Massachusetts legislature
- 1919 Massachusetts legislature
- 1920 Massachusetts legislature
- 1921–1922 Massachusetts legislature
- 1923–1924 Massachusetts legislature
