= John E. Beck =

American politician

John Edward Beck
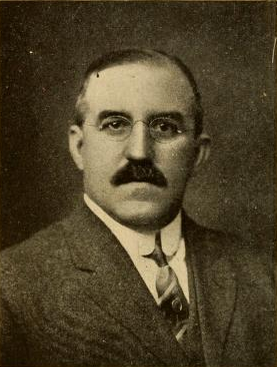

Member of the Massachusetts State Senate from the 1st Suffolk district
- In office 1905–1906
- Preceded by: A. Dudley Bagely
- Succeeded by: Alfred Sigourney Hall
- In office 1916–1919
- Preceded by: Edward C. R. Bagley

Member of the Massachusetts House of Representatives
- In office 1902–1903
- Succeeded by: Daniel M. O'Connell
- Constituency: 26th Suffolk District
- In office 1913–1914
- Succeeded by: Edgar H. Whitney
- Constituency: 27th Suffolk district

24th Mayor of Chelsea, Massachusetts
- In office 1908 – June 4, 1908
- Preceded by: Edward E. Willard
- Succeeded by: Board of Control

Personal details
- Born: May 10, 1869 Boston, Massachusetts
- Died: July 25, 1952 (aged 83) Chelsea, Massachusetts
- Party: Republican
- Profession: Real estate and insurance Newspaper publisher

John Edward Beck (May 10, 1869 – July 25, 1952) was a Massachusetts businessman, and politician who served in both branches of the Massachusetts legislature; and as a member of the Board of Aldermen, and the twenty fourth Mayor of Chelsea, Massachusetts.

== Business career ==
Beck was a business who was involved in real estate and insurance and the publisher of The Chelsea Gazette.

== See also ==
- 1905 Massachusetts legislature
- 1916 Massachusetts legislature
- 1917 Massachusetts legislature
- 1918 Massachusetts legislature
- 1919 Massachusetts legislature
- 1923–1924 Massachusetts legislature
- 1925–1926 Massachusetts legislature
- 1927–1928 Massachusetts legislature

== Notes ==
Political offices
Preceded by Edward E. Willard	24th Mayor of Chelsea, Massachusetts; 1908 – June 4, 1908	Succeeded by Board of Control
