= Joseph W. Martin Jr. =

American politician (1884–1968)

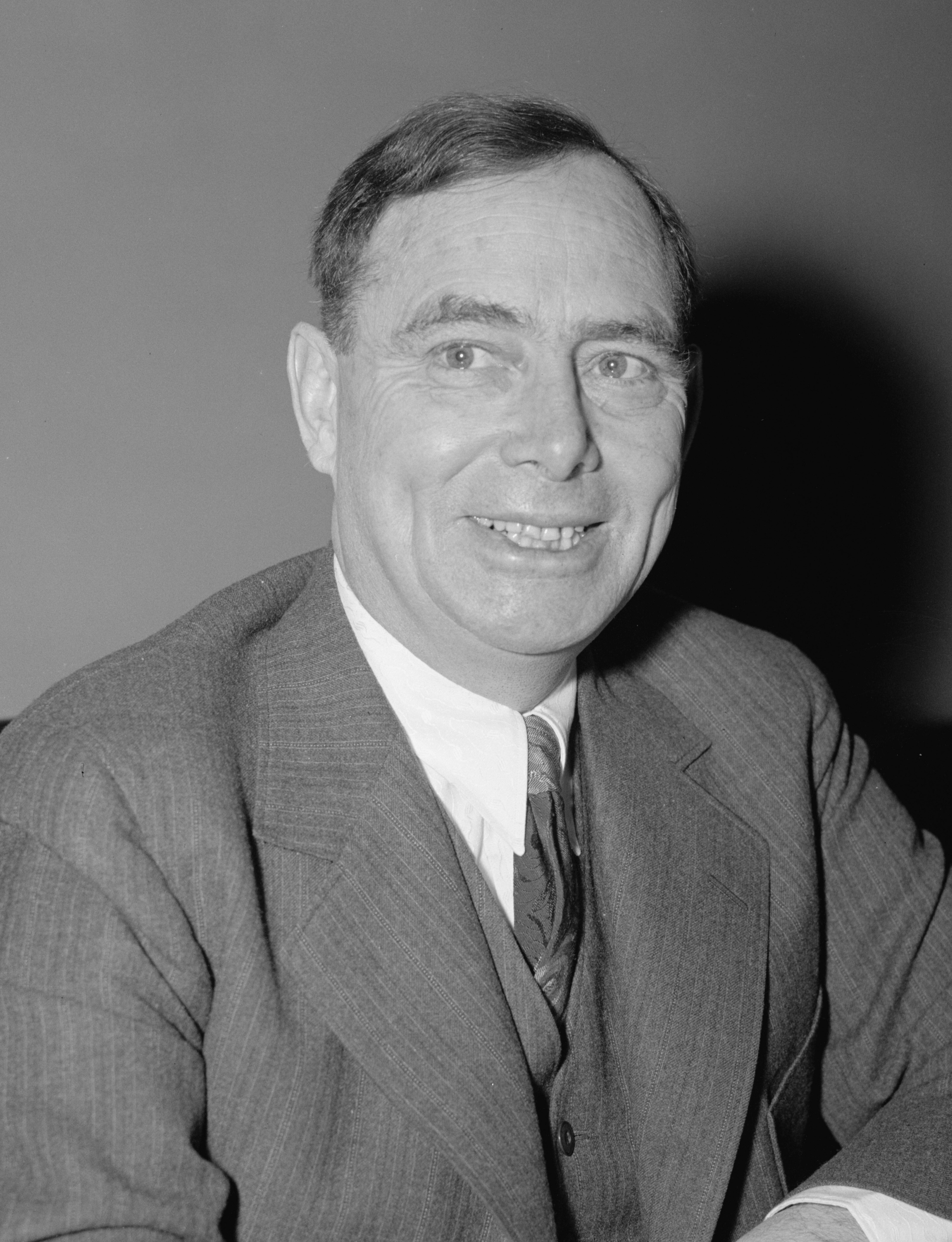
- Martin in 1940

44th Speaker of the United States House of Representatives
- In office January 3, 1953 – January 3, 1955
- Preceded by: Sam Rayburn
- Succeeded by: Sam Rayburn
- In office January 3, 1947 – January 3, 1949
- Preceded by: Sam Rayburn
- Succeeded by: Sam Rayburn

House Minority Leader
- In office January 3, 1955 – January 3, 1959
- Deputy: Leslie C. Arends
- Preceded by: Sam Rayburn
- Succeeded by: Charles A. Halleck
- In office January 3, 1949 – January 3, 1953
- Deputy: Leslie C. Arends
- Preceded by: Sam Rayburn
- Succeeded by: Sam Rayburn
- In office January 3, 1939 – January 3, 1947
- Deputy: Harry Lane Englebright; Leslie C. Arends
- Preceded by: Bertrand Snell
- Succeeded by: Sam Rayburn

Chair of the Republican National Committee
- In office July 8, 1940 – December 7, 1942
- Preceded by: John Hamilton
- Succeeded by: Harrison E. Spangler

Leader of the House Republican Conference
- In office January 3, 1939 – January 3, 1959
- Deputy: Harry Lane Englebright; Leslie C. Arends; Charles A. Halleck; Leslie C. Arends; Charles A. Halleck; Leslie C. Arends
- Preceded by: Bertrand Snell
- Succeeded by: Charles A. Halleck

Member of the U.S. House of Representatives from Massachusetts
- In office March 4, 1925 – January 3, 1967
- Preceded by: Robert M. Leach
- Succeeded by: Margaret Heckler
- Constituency: 15th district (1925–1933); 14th district (1933–1963); 10th district (1963–1967)

Personal details
- Born: Joseph William Martin Jr. November 3, 1884 North Attleborough, Massachusetts, U.S.
- Died: March 6, 1968 (aged 83) Hollywood, Florida, U.S.
- Party: Republican
- Martin's voice Martin speaks in support of declaring war on Japan; Recorded December 8, 1941

Joseph William Martin Jr. (November 3, 1884 – March 6, 1968) was an American Republican politician who served as the 44th speaker of the United States House of Representatives from 1947 to 1949 and 1953 to 1955. He represented a House district centered on his hometown of North Attleborough, Massachusetts, from 1925 to 1967 and was the leader of House Republicans from 1939 until 1959, when he was ousted from leadership after the party's disastrous losses in the 1958 elections. He was the only Republican to serve as Speaker in a sixty-four year period from 1931 to 1995. He was a "compassionate conservative" who opposed the New Deal and supported the conservative coalition of Republicans and southern Democrats.

Early in his career, Martin worked as a newspaper editor and served in both houses of the Massachusetts General Court. He won election to the United States House of Representatives in 1923. He was elected House Minority Leader after the 1938 elections. He also served as Chairman of the Republican National Committee from 1940 to 1942 at the behest of Wendell Willkie, the 1940 Republican presidential nominee. Martin presided over five Republican National Conventions and frequently became involved in presidential politics. He urged General Douglas MacArthur to seek the 1952 Republican presidential nomination, and supporters of Robert A. Taft accused Martin of favoring Dwight D. Eisenhower in Martin's role as chairman of the contentious 1952 Republican National Convention. After Eisenhower won the 1952 election, Martin supported Eisenhower's internationalist foreign policy.

Martin lost his position as Republican leader after the party lost seats in the 1958 elections. He was succeeded by his more conservative deputy, Charles A. Halleck. Martin continued to serve in Congress until his defeat in the 1966 Republican primary by Margaret Heckler. Martin died in Hollywood, Florida, in 1968.

== Background ==
Joseph Martin was born in North Attleborough, Massachusetts, the son of Catherine (née Keating) and Joseph William Martin, a blacksmith. Keating was born in Ireland in 1862, immigrated from Dublin to New York City in 1878, and settled in Newark, New Jersey, where she met Martin Sr., and they married on July 2, 1882; because Martin was a Presbyterian, the union required a matrimonial dispensation, but because Martin Sr. was a Presbyterian, it was relatively easy to obtain. Martin Jr. graduated from North Attleborough High School, where he played shortstop on the school baseball team. He also played semi-professional ball in an intercity league, from which he earned ten dollars per game.

== Career ==
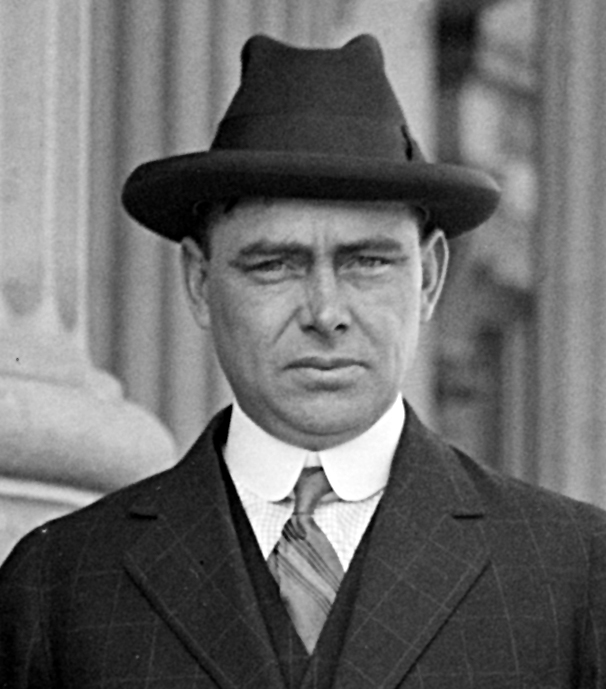
Martin early in his congressional career

Martin served in the Massachusetts House of Representatives (1912–1914), Massachusetts Senate (1914–1917) and the United States House of Representatives (1925–1967). He was a presidential elector in 1920.

Martin was the Chairman of the Republican National Committee from 1940 to 1942, having been recruited to that position by presidential nominee Wendell Willkie, whose nomination came as a complete surprise to political pro Martin. During the New Deal, he stood out as a major opponent of Franklin D. Roosevelt's policies and opposed his internationalist outlook on foreign affairs. However, he supported a few New Deal measures, such as the establishment of the minimum wage.

During the 1940 presidential campaign, Martin achieved a measure of notoriety as one-third of President Roosevelt's famous denunciation of "Martin, Barton and Fish." The other two were fellow GOP House members Bruce Fairchild Barton and Hamilton Fish III.

Martin won re-election in 1946 against the social justice activist Martha Sharp. During his campaign, he called the 41-year-old woman a "little girl".

After 1952, Martin joined the moderate wing of the Republican Party and supported Dwight D. Eisenhower's internationalist outlook (through support of foreign aid), endorsed federal aid for school construction, and backed Lyndon B. Johnson's Economic Opportunity Act of 1964.

In 1960, McGraw-Hill published My First Fifty Years in Politics, by Joe Martin as told to Robert J. Donovan, a lively and detailed account of Martin's role in American politics over half-a-century. Martin was the longtime publisher of The Evening Chronicle newspaper in North Attleborough. After his death it merged with a nearby rival and became The Sun Chronicle newspaper.

=== Leadership ===
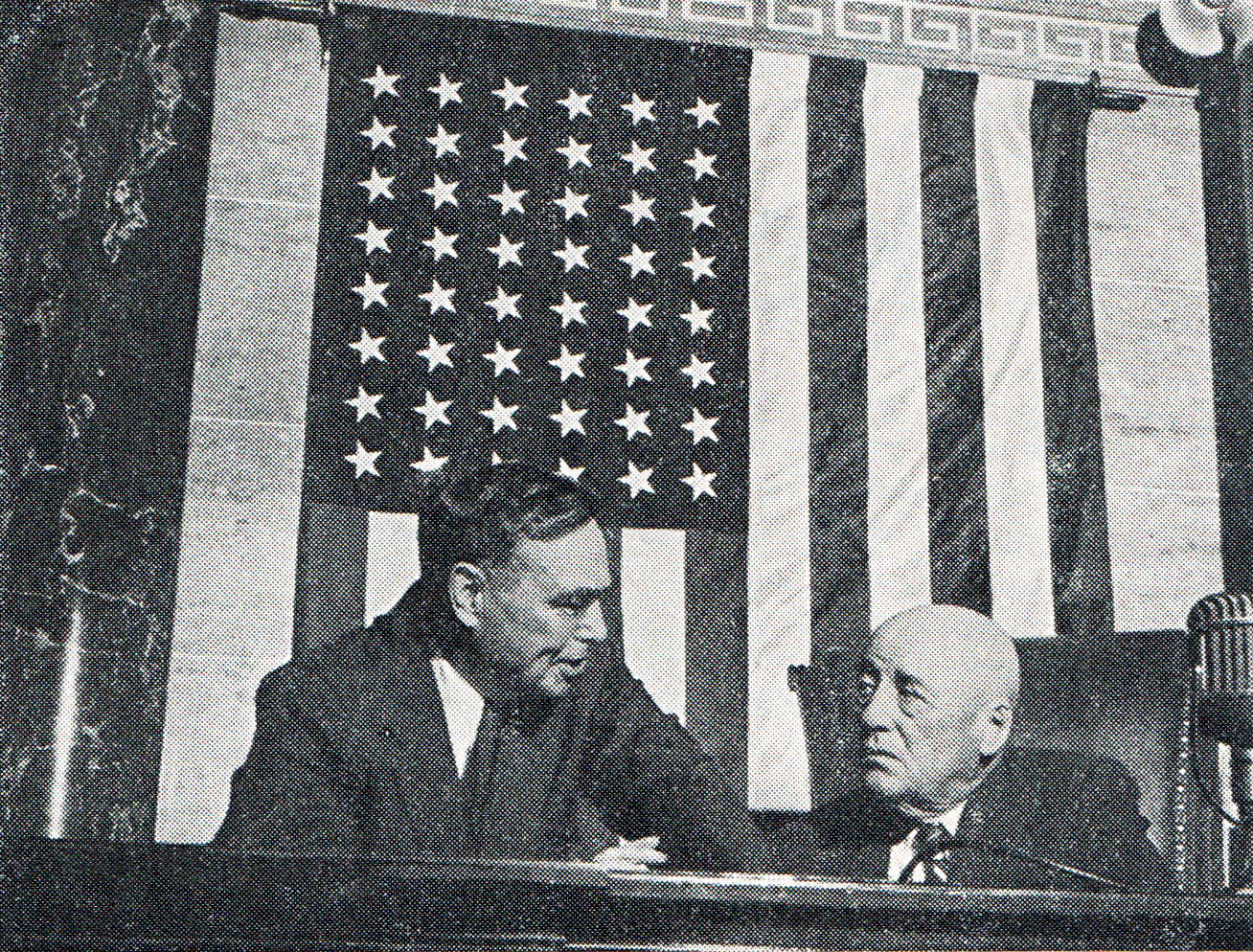
Martin and Sam Rayburn at the U.S. Capitol

Martin was elected House Minority Leader following Republican gains in the 1938 elections. He served as Speaker of the House of Representatives for two non-consecutive terms: from 1947 to 1949, and again from 1953 to 1955. The terms represented two Republican short-term majorities in the House, and Martin's two terms were bookended by Sam Rayburn, the Texas Democrat and mentor of Lyndon Johnson with whom Martin enjoyed a warm personal relationship.

Probably the most controversial moment of Martin's congressional career came in April 1951, when he read on the floor of Congress a letter he had received from General Douglas MacArthur, who was commanding US troops fighting in the Korean War. President Harry S Truman had decided on peace negotiations as the best way out of the grinding conflict. MacArthur's letter, written in response to one from Martin asking for the general's views on Truman's policy, was scathingly critical of the president.

Martin had hoped that disclosing the letter's contents would bolster MacArthur's case. Instead, it ignited a political firestorm and demands for his removal. Six days after Martin read the letter on the House floor, Truman dismissed MacArthur.

Despite the unintended outcome, Martin and MacArthur remained friends. Martin invited the general to deliver what became known popularly as the "Old Soldiers Never Die" speech before a joint meeting of Congress following his dismissal. In 1952, Martin urged MacArthur to seek the Republican presidential nomination. MacArthur, however, favored U.S. Senator Robert A. Taft, of Ohio, who lost the nomination to Willkie in 1940, to Dewey in 1948, and to Eisenhower in 1952. Eisenhower then defeated Governor Adlai E. Stevenson II of Illinois.

In his capacity as leader of the House Republicans, Martin presided over the Republican National Convention on five occasions between 1940 and 1956. In 1940, he was instrumental in the choice of Senate Minority Leader Charles L. McNary of Oregon as Wendell Willkie's running mate. Martin's most controversial role was at the 1952 Republican National Convention, when several of his rulings were seen as tilting the nomination to Eisenhower over Taft.

In preparation for the 1952 elections, Martin traveled to Hot Springs, Arkansas, for a regional Republican meeting called by the state party chairman Osro Cobb, a former member of the Arkansas House of Representatives, to unveil a potential strategy to make the party competitive in the American South. "We came away from the meeting more determined and better prepared to advance the two-party system in the South," recalled Cobb in his memoirs, as the Republicans won at the presidential level that year in Tennessee, Texas, Florida, and Virginia.

Martin was in the Speaker's chair presiding over the House on March 1, 1954, when four Puerto Rican independence activists opened fire on the House, wounding five Representatives. Martin declared the House in recess as he sought cover behind a marble pillar on the rostrum. Martin would be the last Republican to serve as Speaker of the House until the election of Newt Gingrich of Georgia 40 years later. Martin remained the leader of the House Republicans until 1958, when the party experienced heavy losses in that year's elections. In the aftermath, Martin was ousted from the leadership by his deputy, Charles A. Halleck.

Despite the defeat, Martin chose to remain as a backbench member of the House. Eight years later, in 1966, he was ousted from his seat in the Republican primary by a more liberal Republican, Margaret Heckler, who was 46 years his junior. He was also one of seven Speakers to serve more than one non-consecutive term and the second Republican to do so. Martin voted in favor of the Civil Rights Acts of 1957, 1960, and 1964, as well as the 24th Amendment to the U.S. Constitution. Martin voted in favor of the House amendment to the Voting Rights Act of 1965 on July 9, 1965, but did not vote on the joint conference committee report on August 3, 1965.

Martin was a Zionist who supported the recognition of the state of Israel.

A lifelong bachelor, Martin never married.

Martin died in Hollywood, Florida, on March 6, 1968. He was buried at Mount Hope Cemetery in North Attleborough, Massachusetts.

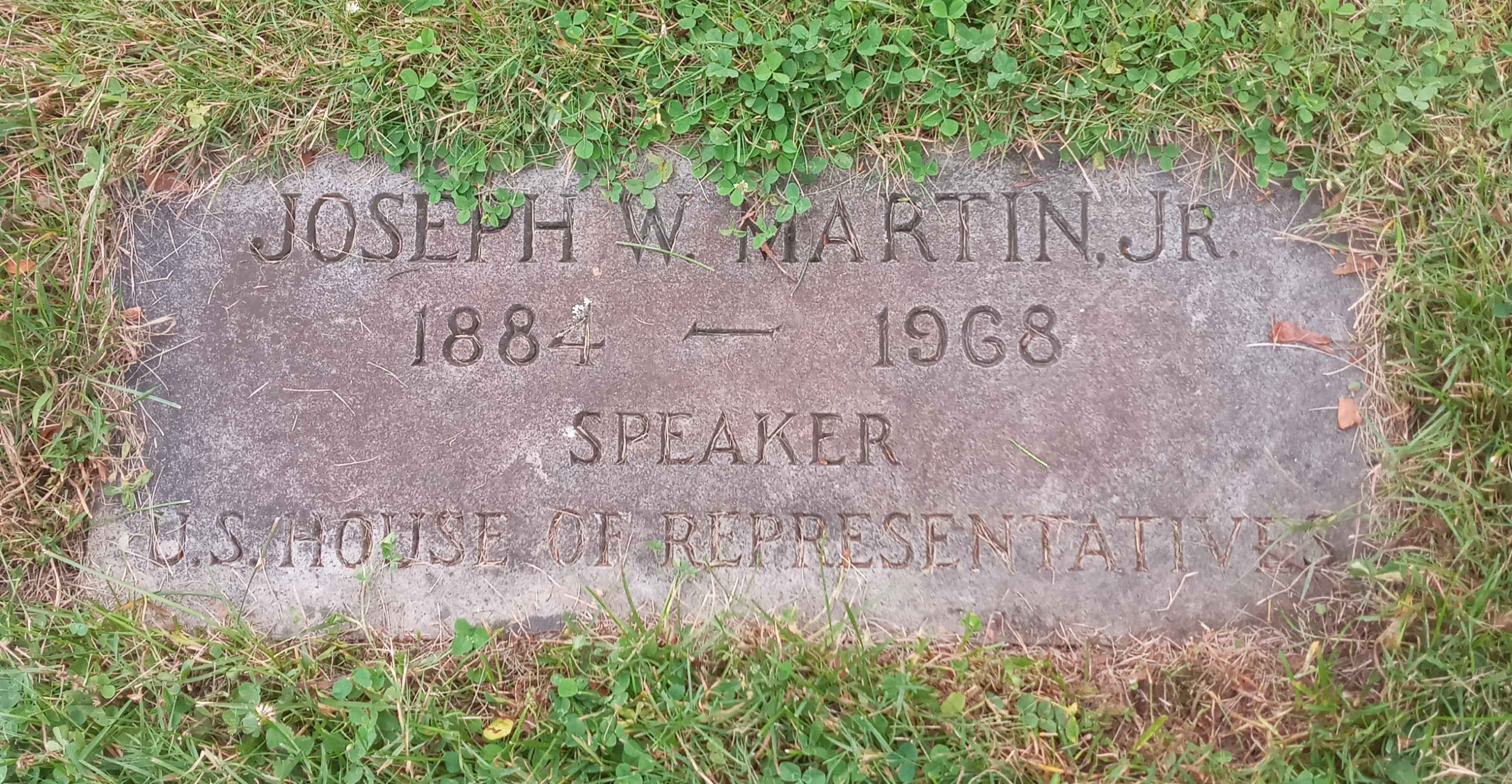
The gravesite of Speaker Martin

== Legacy ==
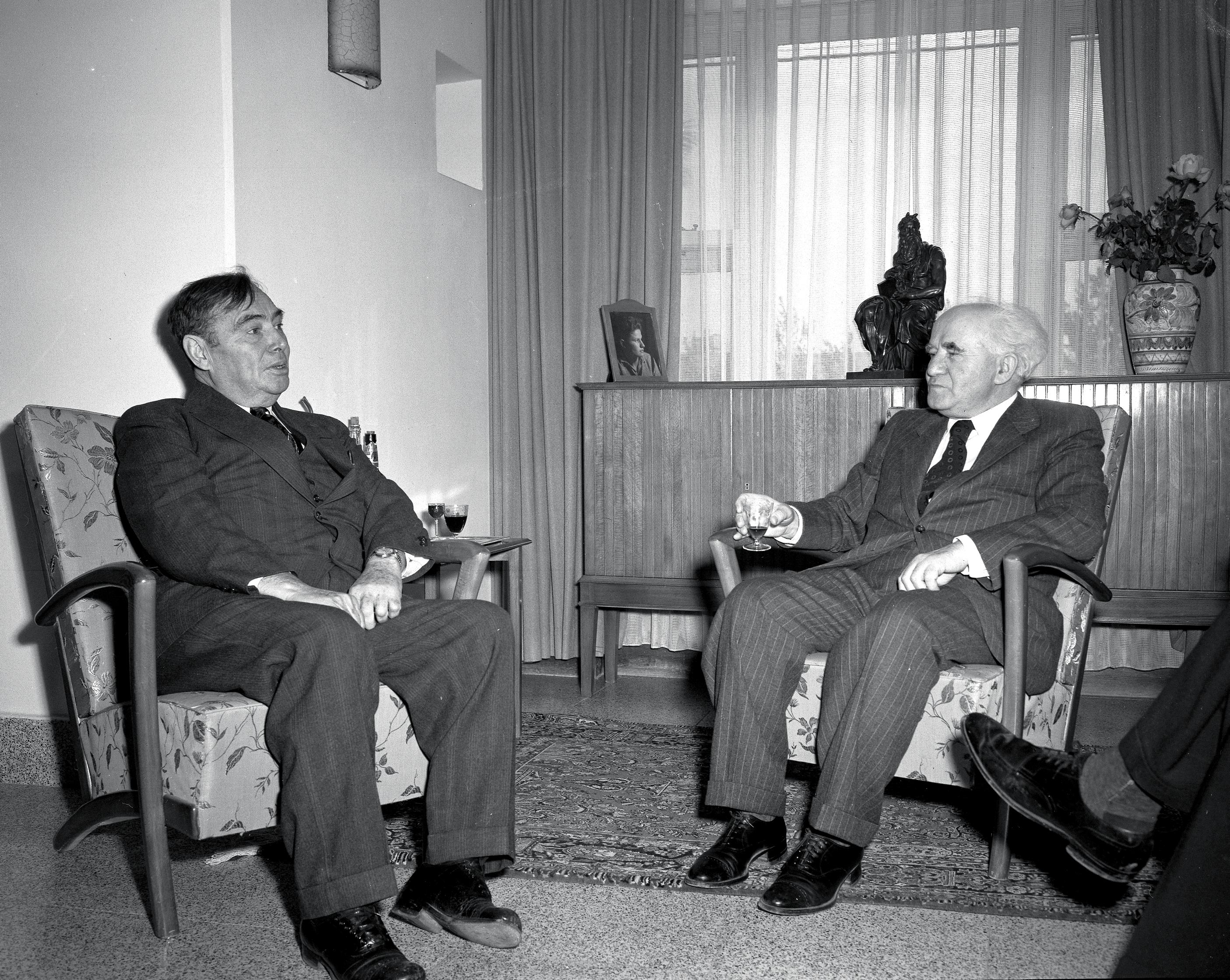
Joseph W. Martin with Israel's Prime Minister David Ben-Gurion in Jerusalem, 1951

Today in his hometown of North Attleborough, the Joseph W. Martin Jr. Elementary School bears his name, as does the Joseph W. Martin Institute for Law and Society which houses his personal archives. The Martin Institute is located at Stonehill College in North Easton, Massachusetts.

In 2007, the North Attleborough High School Alumni Association established the Joseph W. Martin Jr. Distinguished Alumni Award to recognize the outstanding professional and civic achievements of the men and women who are former students of North Attleborough High School.

== See also ==
- 1915 Massachusetts legislature
- 1916 Massachusetts legislature
- 1917 Massachusetts legislature

U.S. House of Representatives
Preceded by Robert M. Leach	Member of the U.S. House of Representatives from Massachusetts's 15th congressional district 1925–1933	Succeeded by Charles L. Gifford
Preceded by Richard B. Wigglesworth	Member of the U.S. House of Representatives from Massachusetts's 14th congressional district 1933–1963	Constituency abolished
Preceded by Bertrand Snell	House Minority Leader; 1939–1947	Succeeded by Sam Rayburn
Preceded by Sam Rayburn	House Minority Leader; 1949–1953	Succeeded by Sam Rayburn
Preceded by Sam Rayburn	House Minority Leader; 1955–1959	Succeeded by Charles Halleck
Preceded by Laurence Curtis	Member of the U.S. House of Representatives from Massachusetts's 10th congressional district 1963–1967	Succeeded by Margaret Heckler
Party political offices
Preceded by Bertrand Snell	House Republican Leader; 1939–1959	Succeeded by Charles Halleck
Preceded by John Hamilton	Chair of the Republican National Committee; 1940–1942	Succeeded by Harrison E. Spangler
Political offices
Preceded by Sam Rayburn	Speaker of the United States House of Representatives; 1947–1949	Succeeded by Sam Rayburn
Preceded by Sam Rayburn	Speaker of the United States House of Representatives; 1953–1955	Succeeded by Sam Rayburn
