= Louis Cox =

American judge (1874–1961)

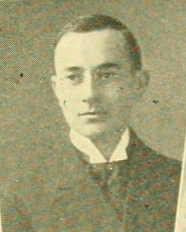
Louis S. Cox

Louis Sherburne Cox (November 22, 1874 – May 12, 1961) was a justice of the Massachusetts Supreme Judicial Court from November 10, 1937, to January 12, 1944. He was appointed by Governor Charles F. Hurley.

== Biography ==
Born in Manchester, New Hampshire, Cox was one of four brothers including Channing H. Cox, who became Governor of Massachusetts. Cox received a B.A. from Dartmouth College in 1896, and a law degree from Boston University School of Law in 1899. In 1904, he was elected to represent Lawrence, Massachusetts in the Massachusetts Senate, and in 1906 was appointed as a postmaster by President Theodore Roosevelt. In 1915, Cox was elected Essex County District Attorney, which office he held until 1918, when Governor Samuel W. McCall appointed Cox to the Massachusetts Superior Court. In 1937, Governor Charles F. Hurley appointed Cox to the state supreme court, where Cox remained until 1944.

On October 16, 1902, Cox married Mary I. Fields, with whom he had a son and a daughter.

Cox died at Lawrence General Hospital in Lawrence, Massachusetts, at the age of 87.

Political offices
Preceded by Michael A. Sullivan	District Attorney of Essex County, Massachusetts; 1915–1918	Succeeded by Henry Gordon Wells
Legal offices
Preceded by Edward Pierce	Justice of the Massachusetts Supreme Judicial Court; 1937–1944	Succeeded by Raymond Sanger Wilkins
