= James E. Tolman =

American politician

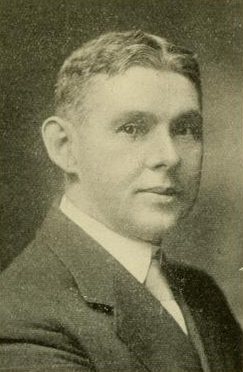
- Tolman c. 1915

Member of the Massachusetts State Senate from the 3rd Essex district
- In office 1910–1911
- Preceded by: James F. Shaw
- Succeeded by: George A. Schofield

Member of the Massachusetts House of Representatives from the 21st Essex district
- In office 1909–1909
- Preceded by: John A. Stoddart
- Succeeded by: George A. Ricker
- Constituency: 22nd Essex district
- In office 1914–1916
- Preceded by: Charles D. Smith
- Succeeded by: James MacFarlane Lyle
- Constituency: 22nd Essex district
- In office 1917–1918
- Preceded by: Harry C. Foster
- Succeeded by: John Thomas
- Constituency: 21st Essex district

Mayor of Gloucester, Massachusetts
- In office 1903 – January 2, 1905
- Preceded by: William W. French
- Succeeded by: George E. MacDonald

Personal details
- Born: November 8, 1867 Gloucester, Massachusetts
- Died: February 20, 1956 (aged 88) Gloucester, Massachusetts
- Party: Republican
- Education: Boston University School of Law
- Occupation: Lawyer; Theatre owner Grocery and provision business

James E. Tolman (November 8, 1867 – February 21, 1956) was an American lawyer, and politician who served as the mayor of Gloucester, Massachusetts, and as a member of the Massachusetts House of Representatives.

== Early life and education ==
Tolman was born on November 8, 1867, in Gloucester, Massachusetts. He attended Gloucester public schools and in 1909 graduated from Boston University School of Law.

== Business career ==
Tolman was admitted to the Massachusetts Bar in 1910. For fifteen years, he worked in the theatre business as part of the partnership of Lothrop and Tolman. Tolman also worked in the grocery and provision business.

== Political career ==
=== Gloucester, Massachusetts Common Council ===
From 1899 to 1901 Tolman served on the Gloucester, Massachusetts Common Council. For two years, in 1899 and in 1901, Tolman was the President of the Common Council.

=== Mayor of Gloucester ===
In 1902 Tolman ran as an Independent Republican Gloucester mayoral election. On December 2, 1902 Tolman was elected as the mayor of Gloucester.

=== Massachusetts House of Representatives ===
Tolman served as a Republican member of the Massachusetts House representing the Twenty Second Essex District in 1909, and again from 1914 to 1916. From 1917 to 1918 Tolman represented the Twenty First Essex District in the House.

In the 1909 House Tolman served as the Clerk of the Committee on Public Lighting. In the 1914 House Tolman served on the Committee on Legal Affairs and on the Committee on Public Lighting. In the 1915 House Tolman served as the Chairman of the Committee on Public Lighting. In the 1916 House Tolman served on the committee on legal affairs and as the Chairman of the committee on public lighting.

=== Massachusetts Senate ===
From 1910 to 1912, Tolman represented the Third Essex District in the Massachusetts State Senate In the 1910 Senate Tolman served as the Chairman of the Committee of Third Reading, and on the Committees on Legal Affairs, Mercantile Affairs and Constitutional Amendments. In the 1911 Senate Tolman served as the Chairman of the Committees on Legal Affairs and of Public Lighting, and on the Committee on Mercantile Affairs.

=== Later life ===
Tolman died on February 21, 1956, at his home in Gloucester. He was 88 years old.

== See also ==
- 1910 Massachusetts legislature
- 1915 Massachusetts legislature
- 1916 Massachusetts legislature
- 1917 Massachusetts legislature
- 1918 Massachusetts legislature
