= William J. Foley =

American attorney and politician (1887–1952)

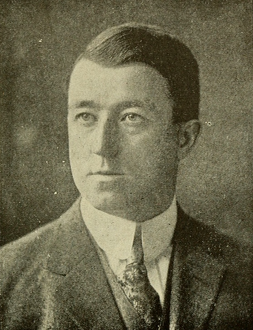
- Foley c. 1918

District Attorney of Suffolk County, Massachusetts
- In office 1927–1952
- Preceded by: Thomas C. O'Brien
- Succeeded by: Garrett H. Byrne

Member of the Massachusetts Governor's Council
- In office 1921–1923

Member of the Massachusetts Senate
- In office 1919–1921

Member of the Massachusetts House of Representatives
- In office 1915–1919

Personal details
- Born: March 2, 1887 South Boston, Massachusetts, US
- Died: December 1, 1952 (aged 65) Boston, Massachusetts, US
- Party: Democratic
- Relations: William J. Foley Jr. (son)
- Education: Boston University School of Law

William J. Foley (March 2, 1887 – December 1, 1952) was an American attorney and politician who served as District Attorney of Suffolk County, Massachusetts from 1927 until his death 1952.

== Early life and educati9n ==
Foley was born on March 2, 1887, in South Boston, to Patrick A. Foley and Julia (née Hayes) Foley. He attended South Boston High School and The English High School. He graduated from the Boston University School of Law in 1908 and began practicing law that year.

== Career ==
A Democrat, Foley was a member of the Massachusetts House of Representatives from 1915 to 1919. He then served in the Massachusetts Senate from 1919 to 1921 and on the Massachusetts Governor's Council from 1921 to 1923. In 1927, he defeated incumbent Thomas C. O'Brien to become District Attorney of Suffolk County. In 1933, he unsuccessfully ran for Mayor of Boston. He finished a close third behind Frederick Mansfield and Malcolm Nichols. He ran again in 1937 and finished fourth behind Maurice J. Tobin, James Michael Curley, and Nichols.

== Personal life and death ==
Foley was Catholic. In 1922, he married Theresa Liston; they had two children together, including William J. Foley Jr., who went on to become a lawyer. Foley was found dead in his home on December 1, 1952, aged 65. The cause of death was a heart attack. Foley's first assistant, Garrett H. Byrne, was chosen by Governor Paul A. Dever to succeed him as district attorney, despite pressure to give the job to the younger Foley or another well known political figure.

== See also ==
- 1915 Massachusetts legislature
- 1916 Massachusetts legislature
- 1917 Massachusetts legislature
- 1918 Massachusetts legislature
- 1919 Massachusetts legislature
- 1920 Massachusetts legislature
