= Channing H. Cox =

American politician (1879–1968)

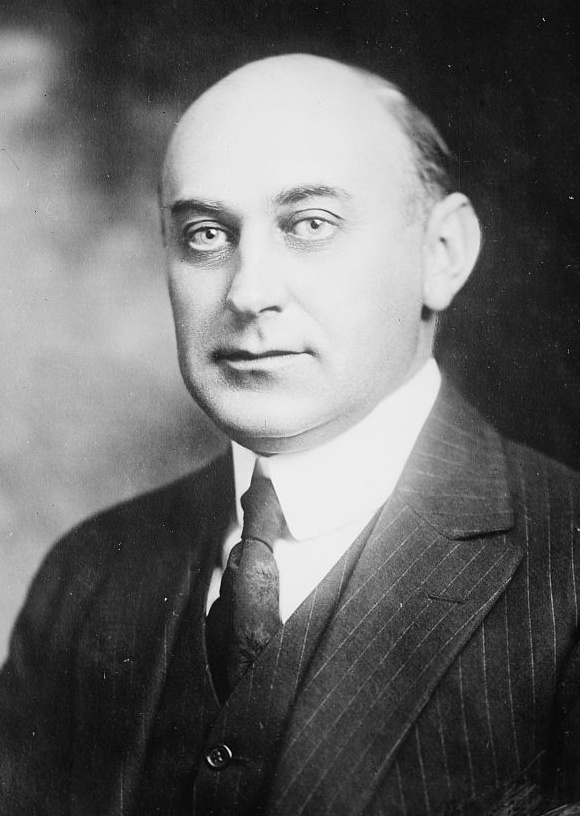
- Cox in 1921

Chair of the National Governors Association
- In office December 14, 1922 – November 17, 1924
- Preceded by: William Cameron Sproul
- Succeeded by: Elbert Lee Trinkle

49th Governor of Massachusetts
- In office January 6, 1921 – January 8, 1925
- Lieutenant: Alvan T. Fuller
- Preceded by: Calvin Coolidge
- Succeeded by: Alvan T. Fuller

47th Lieutenant Governor of Massachusetts
- In office January 2, 1919 – January 6, 1921
- Governor: Calvin Coolidge
- Preceded by: Calvin Coolidge
- Succeeded by: Alvan T. Fuller

Speaker of the Massachusetts House of Representatives
- In office January 6, 1915 – January 2, 1919
- Preceded by: Grafton D. Cushing
- Succeeded by: Joseph E. Warner

Member of the Massachusetts House of Representatives
- In office January 6, 1909 – January 2, 1919

Member of the Boston Common Council
- In office 1908–1909

Personal details
- Born: Channing Harris Cox; October 28, 1879 Manchester, New Hampshire, U.S.
- Died: August 20, 1968 (aged 88) West Harwich, Massachusetts, U.S.
- Party: Republican
- Spouse: Mary Young (m. 1915)
- Children: 1
- Education: Dartmouth College (AB); Harvard University (LLB)

Channing Harris Cox (October 28, 1879 – August 20, 1968) was an American Republican politician, lawyer, and businessman from Massachusetts. He served as the 49th governor of Massachusetts, from 1921 to 1925. He attended Dartmouth College and served as 47th lieutenant governor to Calvin Coolidge, winning election as governor after Coolidge decided to run for vice president. Cox was noted for advancing progressive labor legislation and adjusting administrative law to Massachusetts' changing economy. He was also the first Massachusetts governor to use radio, when he broadcast live from the Eastern States Exposition on September 19, 1921, at the debut of station WBZ in Springfield.

== Early years ==
Channing Cox was born in Manchester, New Hampshire, to Charles Edson Cox and Evelyn Mary (Randall) Cox. He was one of four brothers, one being Louis Cox, who became a Justice of the Massachusetts Supreme Judicial Court. He attended the Manchester public schools and then Dartmouth College, from which he graduated in 1901. He then attended Harvard Law School, receiving his degree there in 1904. Cox remained a lifelong supporter of Dartmouth, where a residence hall is named in his honor.

Cox then opened a law practice in Boston, Massachusetts, which he maintained until he was elected governor.

== Political career ==
Cox entered politics soon after opening his practice, winning his first race for elective office in 1908, for a seat on the Boston Common Council. The following year he won election to the state legislature, where he served nine annual terms, the last four as Speaker of the Massachusetts House of Representatives. During these years he became politically associated with Calvin Coolidge, who was Senate President and Lieutenant Governor. Coolidge tapped Cox as his running mate for governor in 1918, and Cox served two one-year terms as lieutenant governor. Coolidge stepped back to run for Vice President of the United States in 1920.

Cox ran for governor in 1920, which was the first two-year term for the office. His victory over John Jackson Walsh was part of a broad national win for the Republicans, including a sweep of statewide offices in Massachusetts, which was spurred by nativist opposition to Wilson administration policies on immigration. Cox contributed to the anti-immigrant sentiment in Massachusetts by characterizing discontented immigrants as a "motley array of questionable groups and influences". He won reelection in 1922, in another race against disorganized Democratic opposition. Although the state was in an economic downturn (an early whisper of the Great Depression), with textile production dropping and wages down, his campaigns emphasized "economy and sound administration" in governance, terms which characterized Republican campaigns through the 1920s. In 1922, Cox defeated former Mayor of Boston John "Honey Fitz" Fitzgerald by more than 60,000 votes.

As governor, Cox was somewhat more progressive than Coolidge, advancing a variety of modest reforms. He increased schooling requirements and reduced working hours for children, allowed labor unions to instigate lawsuits against employers, and improved workmen's compensation coverage. He signed legislation restricting the ability of state banks to engage in speculative investments, and instituted a commission on finance and reform to oversee the state's finances. In the 1922 race, Cox claimed credit for reducing income taxes by $2 million and the state's debt by $12 million. Substantive reforms were typically buried by the legislature, which studied reform proposals but generally did not act on them. Cox opted not to run for reelection in 1924, supporting Lieutenant Governor Alvan T. Fuller as his successor.

== Later years and family ==
After leaving office, Cox was encouraged to run for the United States Senate seat opened by the death of Henry Cabot Lodge. He refused, and spent the rest of his active years involved in business and philanthropic pursuits. He served on the boards of numerous local corporations, banks, and non-profits, and was an active member of the state humane society. He died in 1968 at his summer home in West Harwich, Massachusetts, and was buried in Boston's Forest Hills Cemetery.

Cox had married Mary Young of Wellfleet in 1915; they had one child.

In 1922 Cox became a compatriot of the Massachusetts Society of the Sons of the American Revolution.

== See also ==
- 1915 Massachusetts legislature
- 1917 Massachusetts legislature
- 1918 Massachusetts legislature

== Sources ==
- Harman, Jennifer, ed. (2008). Massachusetts Encyclopedia. Hamburg, MI: State Historic Publications. ISBN 9781878592651. OCLC 198759722.
- Huthmacher, J. Joseph (1959). Massachusetts People and Politics, 1919-1933. Cambridge, MA: Belknap Press. OCLC 460668046.
- Litt, Edgar (1965). Political Cultures of Massachusetts. Cambridge, MA: MIT Press. OCLC 391067.

Political offices
| Preceded by Grafton D. Cushing | Speaker of the Massachusetts House of Representatives; 1915–1918 | Succeeded by Joseph E. Warner |
| Preceded by Calvin Coolidge | Lieutenant Governor of Massachusetts; 1919–1921 | Succeeded by Alvan T. Fuller |
| Preceded by Calvin Coolidge | Governor of Massachusetts; 1921–1925 | Succeeded by Alvan T. Fuller |
| Preceded by William Cameron Sproul | Chair of the National Governors Association; 1922–1924 | Succeeded by Elbert Lee Trinkle |
Party political offices
| Preceded by Calvin Coolidge | Republican nominee for Lieutenant Governor of Massachusetts; 1918, 1919 | Succeeded by Alvan T. Fuller |
| Preceded by Calvin Coolidge | Republican nominee for Governor of Massachusetts; 1920, 1922 | Succeeded by Alvan T. Fuller |
