= Frank H. Putnam =

American politician (1880–1934)

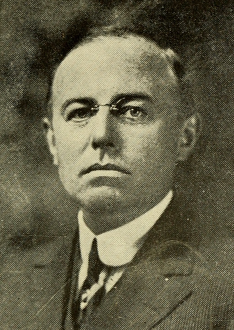

Member of the Massachusetts Senate for the 8th Middlesex district
- In office 1920–1924
- Preceded by: Arthur W. Colburn
- Succeeded by: Walter Perham

Member of the Massachusetts House of Representatives for the 15th Middlesex district
- In office 1917–1919

Personal details
- Born: August 30, 1880 Lowell, Massachusetts
- Died: May 1, 1934 (aged 53) Lowell, Massachusetts
- Party: Republican
- Occupation: Wholesale produce dealer

Frank H. Putnam (August 30, 1880 – May 1, 1934) was an American politician who served both chambers of the Massachusetts General Court and was a member of the state's Commission of Administration and Finance.

== Early life ==
Putnam was born on August 30, 1880, in Lowell, Massachusetts. He was educated in the Lowell Public Schools and was a partner in George E. Putnam & Son, a wholesale produce business.

== Career ==
Putnam was a member of the Massachusetts House of Representatives from 1917 to 1919 and represented the 8th Middlesex district in the Massachusetts Senate from 1920 to 1924. In 1924, he was appointed to a seat on the state's Commission of Administration and Finance and given the position of commissioner of personnel and standardization. On April 28, 1934, Putnam was injured when his automobile struck a tree at The Country Club. He died from his injuries three days later.
