= Eddie Morris (announcer) =

American politician and sports announcer

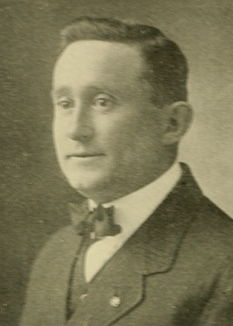
- Morris c. 1915

Member of the Massachusetts Senate from the 3rd Suffolk District
- In office 1917–1918
- Preceded by: Philip J. McGonagle
- Succeeded by: William J. Foley

Personal details
- Born: Boston, Massachusetts, U.S.
- Died: June 24, 1959 (aged 79) Quincy, Massachusetts, U.S.
- Party: Democratic
- Occupation: Stock broker

Edward G. Morris was an American politician who was a member of the Massachusetts House of Representatives from 1915 to 1916, and the Massachusetts Senate from 1917 to 1918. He was also the stadium announcer for Harvard Crimson football games from 1904 to 1933.

== Personal life ==
Morris was born in Boston and attended Boston Public Schools. He worked in the financial industry and ran his own brokerage from 1918 until the Wall Street Crash of 1929.

== Politics ==
Morris was a member of Boston's Democratic ward committee from 1903 to 1905 and 1911 to 1912. He represented the 15th Suffolk district in the Massachusetts House of Representatives from 1915 to 1916 and the 3rd Suffolk district in the Massachusetts senate from 1917 to 1918. He was the Democratic nominee for Massachusetts's 14th congressional district seat in the 1930 and 1932 United States House of Representatives elections.

Morris left South Boston for Quincy's Wollaston neighborhood. He served as the city's tax collector during the administration of mayor Charles A. Ross.

== Harvard football ==
After a year or two controlling the scoreboard at Harvard Stadium, Morris moved on the field to provide signals to the scoreboard operator. In order to stand out on the sidelines, Morris wore a red sweater and white cap that became his trademark. He started out using number cards to show who carried the ball and made the tackle, however, he found that it took him too long to signal using this method. He invented his own system using hand, arm, leg, and body movements based on signals used by stock brokers. By 1927, he had 61 different signals. At the end of each quarter, Morris would announce the scores of other football games. His voice was so strong that he did not use a megaphone. In 1931, Harvard installed a new electric scoreboard that eliminated the need for Morris' signals. He duties were limited to announcing substitutions and scores of other games. Illness forced him to give up the job in 1934. He died on June 24, 1959, at his home in Wollaston.
