= Frank E. Lyman =

American politician

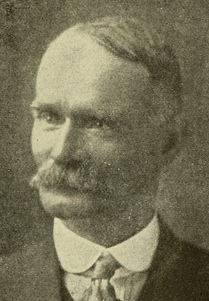

Massachusetts Commissioner of Public Works
- In office 1925–1934
- Preceded by: William F. Williams
- Succeeded by: William F. Callahan

Member of the Massachusetts House of Representatives for the 2nd Hampshire District
- In office 1915–1922
- Preceded by: Charles R. Damon
- Succeeded by: Frederick E. Judd

Personal details
- Born: September 15, 1866 Grafton, Vermont
- Died: December 13, 1938 (aged 72) Easthampton, Massachusetts
- Party: Republican
- Occupation: Farmer

Frank Ernest Lyman (September 15, 1866 – December 12, 1938) was an American politician who served as Massachusetts' Commissioner of Public Works and was a member of the Massachusetts House of Representatives.

== Early life ==
Lyman was born on September 15, 1866, in Grafton, Vermont. His father's sawmill was destroyed by the flood of 1869 and the family left Grafton for Bellows Falls, Vermont, where Lyman attended public schools. When Lyman was 11 years old his father's health began to fail and the family moved west in hopes the change in climate would help. The family settled in Kansas, where Lyman sought work as a cowboy. However, because of his young age, Lyman was put to work as a cook in a camp of cowboys. When he was thirteen his family moved to Colorado, where Lyman worked at a mining company. He started out as an office boy and by the age of 18 he was a foreman at the state's largest coal mine. When Lyman was 25 he moved to Easthampton, Massachusetts, where he ran the city's first steam laundry before taking up farming.

== Politics ==
Lyman was a member of the Easthampton board of selectmen from 1907 to 1915. He then represented the 2nd Hampshire District in the Massachusetts House of Representatives from 1915 to 1922. He was also a member of the Massachusetts Constitutional Convention of 1917. In 1922 he was appointed associate commissioner of public works by Governor Channing H. Cox. On December 24, 1925, he was appointed commissioner of public works by Governor Alvan T. Fuller and unanimously confirmed by the Massachusetts Governor's Council. In 1934, Lyman broke with the Republican Party, appearing at a Democratic rally and stating that Governor Joseph B. Ely had done well and deserved reelection. Earlier that year, Republican gubernatorial nominee William S. Youngman accused Lyman of fraud for paying too much for the surrender of the Boston and Worcester Street Railway's track locations between Boston and Worcester. Ely was reelected, however on December 19, 1934, the Massachusetts Governor's Council rejected 13 of Ely's appointments, including a 6 to 3 vote against Lyman's reappointment. From 1934 to 1936, Lyman served as an associate commissioner of public works. In December 1937 he was appointed western coordinator of highway work. He died on December 13, 1938, after a long illness.
