= Ken Nash =

American baseball player (1888–1977)

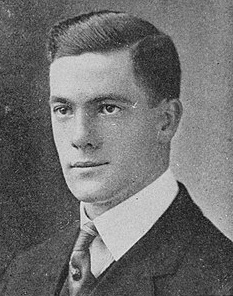
- Infielder
- Born: July 14, 1888; Weymouth, Massachusetts, U.S.
- Died: February 16, 1977 (aged 88); Epsom, New Hampshire, U.S.
- Batted: Both Threw: Right

MLB debut
- July 4, 1912, for the Cleveland Naps

Last MLB appearance
- October 5, 1914, for the St. Louis Cardinals

MLB statistics
- Batting average: .243
- Home runs: 0
- Runs batted in: 6
- Stats at Baseball Reference

Teams
- Cleveland Naps (1912); St. Louis Cardinals (1914)

Kenneth Leland Nash (July 14, 1888 – February 16, 1977) was an American baseball player, politician, and judge. He was a Major League Baseball infielder who played for two seasons. He split time as a shortstop, third baseman, and second baseman. He was elected to the Massachusetts House of Representatives during his playing career and eventually left baseball to focus on politics and pursue a legal career. He spent 52 years as a Massachusetts District Court judge, retiring in 1970 at the age of 82.

== Playing career ==
Nash played shortstop and pitched for Weymouth High School and was captain of the 1906 team. After graduating, he went into the insurance business in Boston, but eventually returned to Weymouth for postgraduate work. He played four seasons for the Brown Bears baseball team and was the team captain in 1912, his senior season.

Nash played 11 games for the Cleveland Naps in 1912. He appeared in one game under the name "Costello". According to Nash's brother, after an argument with an umpire, Cleveland manager Harry Davis instructed Nash to pinch hit and "tell [the umpire] your name is Costello". Consequently, for over 40 years a player named "Costello" was listed in the official baseball records as having played one game for Cleveland in 1912; this was finally corrected in 1958, with the game being credited to Nash.

Nash played for Toledo Mud Hens and Waterbury Contenders in 1914. His contract was purchased by the St. Louis Cardinals that fall. However, Nash was elected to the Massachusetts House of Representatives that November and could not report to the Cardinals until the end of the 1914 Massachusetts legislature. He appeared in 24 games for the St. Louis Cardinals in 1914. He played for the Montreal Royals in 1915 and signed with the Brooklyn Tip-Tops of the Federal League for the 1916, but the league folded before he could play for the team. He instead played for the St. Paul Saints that year before leaving professional baseball for law and politics. During the 1920s he played for Salem, Massachusetts-based semiprofessional team that included Jack Barry, Chick Davies, and Chick Gagnon.

== Coaching ==
Nash coached baseball at the Milton Academy in 1918 and at Tufts University from 1921 to 1942.

== Politics ==
Nash served in the Massachusetts House of Representatives from 1914 to 1916 and in the Massachusetts Senate from 1917 to 1918.

== Judicial career ==
Nash graduated from the Boston University School of Law was admitted to the bar in 1917. The following year he was appointed an associate justice of the East Norfolk district court by Governor Samuel W. McCall. He was appointed presiding justice by Governor Joseph B. Ely in 1933. He was appointed justice of the appellate division (South District) in 1942 and was made presiding justice in 1952. In 1956 he was selected to be the chairman of the administrative committee of district courts. In 1963, he was appointed by Governor Endicott Peabody to become the first-ever chief justice of the district court system. In this capacity, he had a minor role in the Chappaquiddick incident. He instituted a number of changes, including a revision and recodification of the district court rules, creation of a pay-by-mail program for traffic tickets, and expansion of the six-person jury system. He retired from the bench on September 1, 1970 after a 52 year judicial career.

== Later life ==
A longtime bachelor, Nash married Herberta Stockwell, a public health nurse from Quincy City, in 1970. The judge retired to Epsom, New Hampshire, where he and Herberta lived at Highfields, off a road later renamed Nash Lane in their honor. Ken’s brother Reggie Nash, a decorated educator at Milton Academy, retired nearby in the New Rye area. Kenneth Nash died in Epsom on February 16, 1977.
