= 1914 Massachusetts legislature =

135th Massachusetts General Court
←	134th	136th	→

Overview
- Legislative body: General Court
- Election: November 4, 1913

Senate
- Members: 40
- President: Calvin Coolidge
- Party control: Republican

House
- Members: 240
- Speaker: Grafton D. Cushing
- Party control: Republican

Sessions
- 1st: January 7, 1914 – July 7, 1914

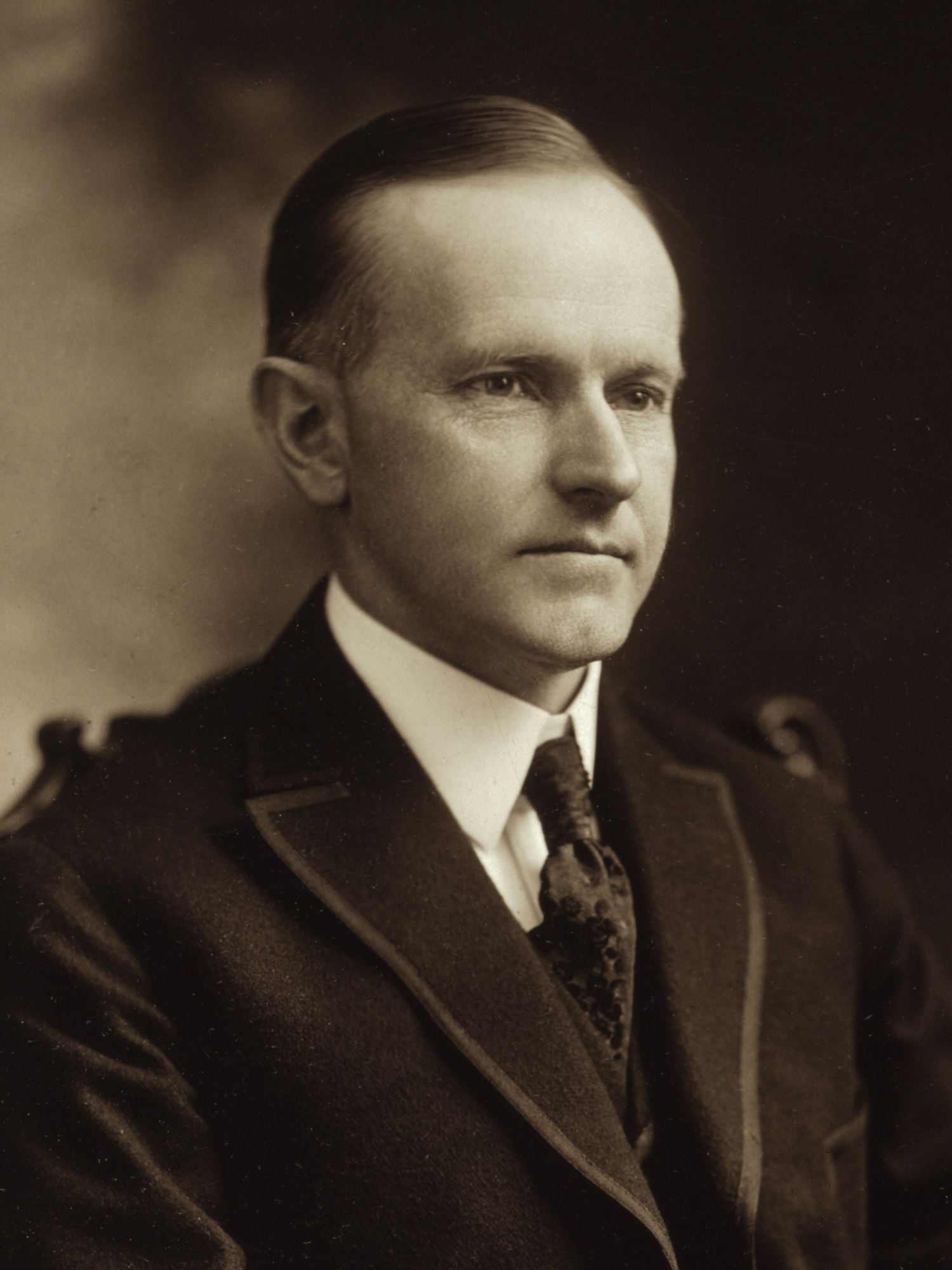
Calvin Coolidge, Senate president.

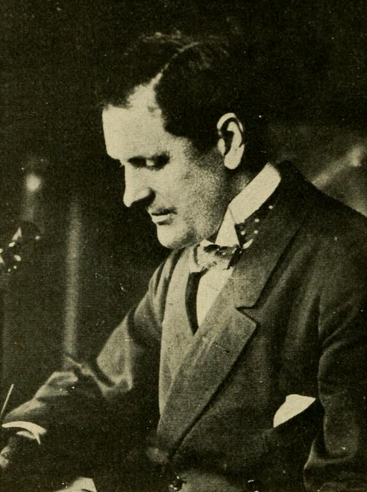
Grafton D. Cushing, House speaker.

Leaders of the Massachusetts General Court, 1914.

The 135th Massachusetts General Court, consisting of the Massachusetts Senate and the Massachusetts House of Representatives, met in 1914 during the governorship of David I. Walsh. Calvin Coolidge served as president of the Senate and Grafton D. Cushing served as speaker of the House.

== Committees ==
- Joint committees: Agriculture; Banks and Banking; Cities; Constitutional Amendments; Counties; Education; Election Laws; Federal Relations; Fisheries and Game; Harbors and Public Lands; Insurance; Labor; Legal Affairs; Mercantile Affairs; Metropolitan Affairs; Military Affairs; Municipal Finance; Public Health; Public Institutions; Public Lighting; Public Service; Railroads; Roads and Bridges; Social Welfare; State House and Libraries; Street Railways; Taxation; Towns; Water Supply.
- Senate committees: Bills in the Third Reading; Engrossed Bills; Judiciary; Rules; Ways and Means.
- House committees: Bills in the Third Reading; Elections; Engrossed Bills; Judiciary; Pay-Roll; Rules; Ways and Means.

== Senators ==
image	name	date of birth	district
	Edward C. R. Bagley		1st Suffolk
	William A. L. Bazeley	1872	
	William A. Bellamy		
	Alexis Boyer Jr.	January 17, 1875	
	John P. Brennan	March 1, 1876	
	James Henry Brennan	December 21, 1888	
	Charles E. Burbank		
	Arthur Preston Chase	January 25, 1866	
	Ezra W. Clark	October 12, 1842	
	Calvin Coolidge	July 4, 1872	
	Charles M. Cox		
	Charles A. Dean	March 26, 1856	
	Andrew P. Doyle	August 15, 1869	
	Henry J. Draper		
	Charles W. Eldridge	October 16, 1877	
	Edward Fisher		
	Redmond S. Fitzgerald		
	Charles L. Gifford	March 15, 1871	
	Gurdon W. Gordon		
	William P. Hickey	November 17, 1871	
	Frederic H. Hilton		
	Clarence Whitman Hobbs Jr.	October 1, 1878	
	Francis J. Horgan		
	Charles Cabot Johnson	December 9, 1876	
	Louis F. R. Langelier		
	Joseph Leonard		
	John H. Mack		
	Charles F. McCarthy	August 15, 1876	
	Philip J. McGonagle	October 21, 1871	
	Walter E. McLane		
	Malcolm Nichols	May 8, 1876	
	C. Augustus Norwood		
	Hugh O'Rourke		
	John F. Sheehan		
	Edward N. Sibley		
	James R. Tetler	August 26, 1877	
	James P. Timilty	March 28, 1865	
	Charles E. Ward		
	Henry Gordon Wells	October 12, 1879	
	Lombard Williams		

== Representatives ==
image	name	date of birth	district
	Essex S. Abbott		
	Henry Achin Jr.	June 30, 1883	
	Timothy J. Ahern	1885	
	Frank P. Allen	August 1, 1869	
	John A. Anderson		
	Henry L. Andrews		
	Oscar E. Arkwell		
	William M. Armstrong	August 17, 1850	
	Charles N. Atwood		
	James J. Bacigalupo		
	James T. Bagshaw		
	Samuel H. Bailey		
	James F. Barry	December 4, 1857	
	Joseph L. Barry		
	Irving F. Batchelder		
	Sanford Bates	July 17, 1884	
	John E. Beck	May 10, 1869	
	Everett E. Belding	February 15, 1879	
	Edward P. Bennett		
	Enos H. Bigelow		
	Edward C. Bodfish		
	William Booth	June 21, 1862	
	Henry E. Bothfeld	March 4, 1859	
	Arthur Bower		
	Eden K. Bowser		
	Patrick H. Boyle	December 20, 1850	
	Alvah J. Bradstreet		
	John W. Brennan		
	George E. Briggs	May 3, 1873	
	Vincent Brogna		
	Daniel J. Buckley		
	Morton Henry Burdick		
	Frederic W. Burke		
	Frederick H. Burke		
	Frederick Butler		
	Matthew J. Carbary		
	Julius F. Carman	August 7, 1861	
	William E. Carney	January 16, 1878	
	Maurice Caro		
	Peter Carr	May 2, 1883	
	Edward Carr	December 18, 1868	
	Andrew A. Casassa		
	Thomas J. Casey		
	Allison G. Catheron	June 26, 1878	
	George Dudley Chamberlain		
	Cleaveland A. Chandler		
	Daniel J. Chapman	January 18, 1878	
	Edward Earl Chapman		
	John W. Churchill	November 17, 1853	
	Eben S. Cobb		
	James Coffey	May 17, 1849	
	Samuel I. Collins	March 4, 1851	
	Timothy C. Collins		
	Walter L. Collins		
	John P. Conroy		
	D. Herbert Cook	June 2, 1851	
	Thomas J. Cooley		
	Michael H. Cotter		
	John J. Courtney		
	Walter D. Cowls		
	Channing H. Cox	October 28, 1879	
	William N. Cronin		
	Fred Wilder Cross	September 15, 1868	
	John E. Cuddy, Jr.		
	John J. Cummings		
	Herbert E. Cummings		
	Patrick J. Curley		
	George E. Curran		
	Rudolph W. Currier		
	John A. Curtin	April 3, 1870	
	Grafton D. Cushing	August 4, 1864	
	Edward N. Dahlborg		
	Edward J. Dailey		
	Charles Robert Damon	June 21, 1864	
	Albert M. Darling		
	Alfred Davenport		
	Samuel Davis	June 4, 1866	
	Theodore H. Day		
	Frederick S. Delafield		
	John F. Doherty	June 9, 1881	
	William H. Dolben	January 23, 1878	
	John A. Donoghue		
	John L. Donovan	June 3, 1876	
	George E. Dow		
	Thomas E. Dowd		
	William F. Doyle		
	George P. Drury		
	Frank B. Edgell		
	George H. Ellis	October 3, 1848	
	John Ennis		
	Frank S. Farnsworth		
	George W. Faulkner	January 24, 1874	
	Frederick B. Felton		
	Alfred N. Fessenden		
	Joseph La Flamme		
	John T. Flanagan	May 25, 1869	
	John J. Fleming		
	Maurice R. Flynn	July 28, 1889	
	Elmer G. Fosgate		
	James Eugene Fowle	November 22, 1880	
	Harvey E. Frost	October 2, 1875	
	John J. Gilbride		
	William L. F. Gilman		
	Thomas A. Glennon		
	John L. G. Glynn		
	Arthur G. Greaney		
	Fred Parker Greenwood		
	James F. Griffin	January 19, 1884	
	Harold P. Gurney		
	William N. Hackett		
	Benjamin F. Haines	November 25, 1876	
	Edward M. Hall		
	John Halliwell	February 21, 1864	
	Bernard F. Hanrahan	July 27, 1875	
	Leo M. Harlow		
	Stephen H. Harrington		
	Edward F. Harrington (state representative)	August 10, 1878	
	James L. Harrop		
	George Fred Hart	November 9, 1859	
	John F. Hatch Jr.		
	Martin Hays	October 14, 1876	
	Thomas A. Henry		
	William Edward Hickey		
	Matthew A. Higgins		
	Albert Holway		
	John B. Hull Jr.	July 17, 1871	
	Frederick W. Hurlburt		
	James M. Hurley		
	Victor Francis Jewett		
	Jeremiah J. Kelley		
	William W. Kennard		
	James T. Kenney	June 20, 1870	
	Michael B. Kenney		
	John R. Kiggins		
	Charles A. Kimball		
	Richard Knowles		
	Joseph O. Knox		
	Charles S. Lawler		
	Francis X. Le Boeuf		
	Fred Oliver Lewis	June 12, 1878	
	E. Ellsworth Lincoln		
	Amos R. Little		
	Stuart L. Little		
	Martin Lomasney	December 3, 1859	
	Henry Follansbee Long		
	William J. Look	June 20, 1867	
	Frederick H. Lucke		
	John J. Lydon		
	James MacFarlane Lyle		
	John H. Lynch	October 28, 1884	
	Frederick H. Magison		
	John C. Mahoney		
	Henry J. Mahoney		
	Daniel C. Manning		
	Frank A. Manning		
	George E. Mansfield		
	Joseph W. Martin Jr.	November 3, 1884	
	Orion T. Mason		
	Alfred E. McCleary		
	Leo F. McCullough		
	Joseph S. McDonough		
	Moses H. McGaughey	December 27, 1880	
	Charles H. McGlue		
	Michael F. McGrath		
	James H. McInerney	December 13, 1871	
	Henry J. McLaughlin		
	Edward F. McLaughlin	June 6, 1883	
	P. Joseph McManus		
	William M. McMorrow		
	Timothy J. Meade	November 7, 1874	
	John Mitchell	September 4, 1877	
	Charles H. Morrill	October 6, 1874	
	George Frederick Morse Jr.	1885	
	Frank Mulveny		
	Edward P. Murphy		
	James J. Murphy	February 11, 1885	
	Dennis A. Murphy	September 26, 1876	
	Patrick E. Murray	August 22, 1869	
	William J. Naphen		
	Ken Nash		
	Arthur N. Newhall		
	Thomas A. Niland	June 11, 1873	
	James T. O'Dowd		
	Ambrose F. Ogden		
	John N. Osborne	January 28, 1853	
	Harry B. Parker		
	Chauncey Pepin		
	Edward Howland Perry		
	Immanuel Pfeiffer Jr.		
	James E. Phelan	October 21, 1884	
	Eben F. Phillips		
	William H. Poole		
	Winfield F. Prime	November 22, 1860	
	Charles W. Proctor		
	Herbert L. Ray		
	John J. Reilly		
	Frank B. Rich		
	Robert Robinson	January 4, 1889	
	William M. Robinson	July 21, 1875	
	Walter F. Russell		
	John D. Ryan	July 30, 1868	
	Clifford B. Sanborn		
	Edward Julius Sandberg	October 21, 1866	
	Roland D. Sawyer	January 8, 1874	
	Henry H. Sears		
	John Francis Sheehan	August 25, 1879	
	John H. Sherburne	1877	
	Ralph M. Smith		
	Jerome S. Smith		
	Fitz-Henry Smith Jr.		
	William O. Souther Jr.		
	Charles Elmer Stanwood		
	Joseph Fayette Stone	February 8, 1858	
	Merrill E. Streeter		
	John F. Sullivan	May 17, 1875	
	Lewis R. Sullivan		
	Michael T. Sullivan		
	David F. Sullivan		
	Peter Francis Tague	June 4, 1871	
	John G. Tilden		
	James E. Tolman	November 8, 1867	
	Nathan A. Tufts	April 15, 1879	
	James J. Twohig	September 26, 1886	
	George J. Wall		
	Henry W. Warner	November 12, 1858	
	Joseph E. Warner	May 16, 1884	
	Robert M. Washburn	January 4, 1868	
	Charles H. Waterman		
	George Pearl Webster	January 9, 1877	
	Charles H. Webster		
	Thomas W. White	January 10, 1876	
	Herbert A. Wilson	November 27, 1870	
	Thomas E. P. Wilson		
	Herbert Wing		
	Abel S. Wolfe		
	George M. Worrall		
	Henry D. Wright		

== See also ==
- 1914 Massachusetts gubernatorial election
- 63rd United States Congress
- List of Massachusetts General Courts
