= 1912 Massachusetts legislature =

133rd Massachusetts General Court
←	132nd	134th	→

Overview
- Legislative body: General Court
- Election: November 7, 1911

Senate
- Members: 40
- President: Levi H. Greenwood
- Party control: Republican

House
- Members: 240
- Speaker: Grafton D. Cushing
- Party control: Republican

Sessions
- 1st: January 3, 1912 – June 13, 1912

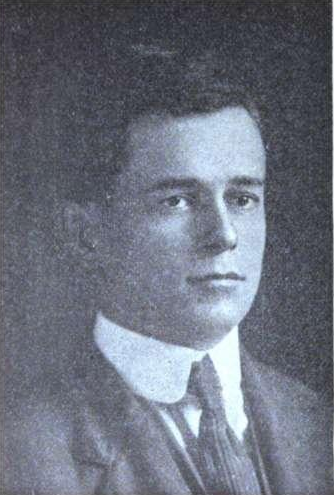
Levi Greenwood, Senate president.

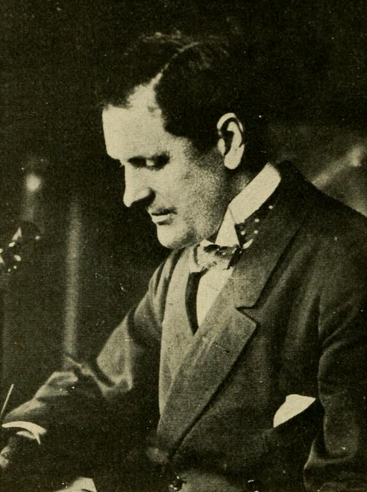
Grafton Cushing, House speaker.

Leaders of the Massachusetts General Court, 1912.

The 133rd Massachusetts General Court, consisting of the Massachusetts Senate and the Massachusetts House of Representatives, met in 1912 during the governorship of Eugene Foss. Levi H. Greenwood served as president of the Senate and Grafton D. Cushing served as speaker of the House.

Notable legislation included the creation of a minimum wage commission.

== Senators ==
image	name	date of birth	district
	Arthur S. Adams	February 14, 1869	
	Claude L. Allen		4th Middlesex
	Erson B. Barlow	October 20, 1883	
	George L. Barnes		
	Frank P. Bennett Jr.	December 30, 1878	
	Charles V. Blanchard	February 2, 1866	
	Charles H. Brown	January 19, 1879	
	William R. Burke	July 14, 1870	
	Charles S. Chace		
	Ezra W. Clark	October 12, 1842	
	Calvin Coolidge	July 4, 1872	
	Daniel E. Denny	July 14, 1845	
	Edric Eldridge		
	Edward J. Grainger		
	Levi H. Greenwood	December 22, 1872	
	Dennis E. Halley		
	James A. Hatton		
	Frederic M. Hersey		
	Francis J. Horgan		
	John H. Hunt		
	Thomas Martin Joyce		
	Joseph P. Lomasney		
	John H. Mack		
	Charles F. McCarthy	August 15, 1876	
	Walter E. McLane		
	Henry C. Mulligan		
	Arthur L. Nason	October 24, 1872	
	George H. Newhall	October 24, 1850	
	Charles H. Pearson		
	James F. Powers	October 1, 1872	
	Francis X. Quigley	November 20, 1882	
	Samuel Ross	February 2, 1865	
	George A. Schofield		
	John H. Schoonmaker	February 14, 1869	
	Harry N. Stearns	October 5, 1874	
	Luke S. Stowe		
	James P. Timilty	March 28, 1865	
	George H. Tinkham	October 29, 1870	
	Thomas M. Vinson		
	William H. Wheeler		

== Representatives ==
image	name	date of birth	district
	Henry Achin Jr.	June 30, 1883	17th Middlesex
	Henry L. Andrews		
	Oscar E. Arkwell		
	Frank W. Atkins		
	Edward C. R. Bagley		
	J. Herbert Baker		
	Willie W. Baker		
	John Ballantyne	July 9, 1869	
	Clarence A. Barnes	August 28, 1882	
	James F. Barry	December 4, 1857	
	Frederick D. Bartlett		
	A. Willis Bartlett	September 21, 1853	
	Sanford Bates	July 17, 1884	
	William A. L. Bazeley	1872	
	John Van Beal		
	Harry Clayton Beaman	March 9, 1863	
	James W. Bean	May 11, 1866	
	William A. Bellamy		
	Arthur H. Bicknell	March 31, 1873	
	Enos H. Bigelow		
	Alvin E. Bliss		
	Charles M. Blodgett		
	William Booth	June 21, 1862	
	Henry E. Bothfeld	March 4, 1859	
	George E. Bowker		
	John G. Brackett		
	George A. Braley	April 23, 1863	
	Melvin B. Breath	March 28, 1881	
	James Henry Brennan	December 21, 1888	
	James J. Brennan	May 2, 1882	
	John P. Brennan	March 1, 1876	
	Vincent Brogna		
	Michael J. Brophy		
	George J. Brunell	November 1, 1865	
	Daniel J. Buckley		
	Morton Henry Burdick		
	George R. Burns	January 4, 1882	
	James D. Burns	July 4, 1876	
	Adolphus M. Burroughs		
	Otis W. Butler		
	Thomas F. J. Callahan		
	Matthew J. Carbary		
	John J. Carmody		
	Patrick B. Carr		
	James F. Cavanagh		
	Wendell P. Clark		
	Albert B. Clark		
	Zebedee E. Cliff	September 23, 1864	
	John Henry Cogswell	July 4, 1875	
	Samuel I. Collins	March 4, 1851	
	John D. Connors		
	Leon M. Conwell	April 15, 1870	
	James H. L. Coon		
	Michael H. Cotter		
	Channing H. Cox	October 28, 1879	
	Joseph Craig		
	Russell D. Crane		
	John J. Creed		
	Courtenay Crocker	February 4, 1881	
	Daniel Francis Cronin		
	Charles A. Crowley	June 11, 1873	
	Thomas S. Cuff		
	Francis M. Cummings	October 4, 1885	
	John A. Curtin	April 3, 1870	
	Grafton D. Cushing	August 4, 1864	
	George T. Daly		
	Thomas Davies	February 11, 1875	
	Charles A. Dean	March 26, 1856	
	John L. Donovan	June 3, 1876	
	Andrew P. Doyle	August 15, 1869	
	George P. Drury		
	William S. Duncan		
	John F. Dwyer		
	James Frank Eagan		
	Harry Millett Eames		
	George W. W. Edson		
	Charles W. Eldridge	October 16, 1877	
	George H. Ellis	October 3, 1848	
	William F. Emerson	October 6, 1849	
	Wilton B. Fay		
	John B. Fellows		
	Edward Fisher		
	Daniel Fitzpatrick		
	John T. Flanagan	May 25, 1869	
	Harold H. Flower		
	Louis A. Foley		
	Fred W. Ford		
	James Eugene Fowle	November 22, 1880	
	Gerrett Geils, Jr.		
	Benjamin D. Gifford		
	William H. Gifford	January 20, 1851	
	Charles L. Gifford	March 15, 1871	
	Gurdon W. Gordon		
	Isaac Gordon		
	Frederic J. Grady		
	William J. Graham	October 2, 1873	
	James I. Green	April 9, 1885	
	Fred Parker Greenwood		
	James F. Griffin	January 19, 1884	
	John W. Haigis	July 31, 1881	
	Benjamin F. Haines	November 25, 1876	
	Freeman Hall	July 22, 1867	
	Edward M. Hall		
	Clarence W. Harding		
	Leonard F. Hardy		
	Edward F. Harrington (state representative)	August 10, 1878	
	James A. Hart	October 29, 1864	
	Edward R. Hathaway		
	Truman R. Hawley		
	Martin Hays	October 14, 1876	
	Michael A. Henebery		
	Ira G. Hersey		
	William P. Hickey	November 17, 1871	
	Clarence Whitman Hobbs Jr.	October 1, 1878	
	Henry W. Holbrook	February 18, 1875	
	Alexander Holmes		
	Charles T. Holt	August 1, 1845	
	Charles H. Howe		
	Frederick W. Hurlburt		
	James M. Hurley		
	Lester W. Jenney	April 24, 1876	
	Victor Francis Jewett		
	John E. Kearns		
	Michael S. Keenan		
	Michael Kelly	June 17, 1840	
	William W. Kennard		
	Louis R. Kiernan		
	Clifford L. King		
	William S. Kinney		
	James Kittle		
	H. Bert Knowles		
	Francis X. Le Boeuf		
	Joseph Leonard		
	William J. Leslie		
	George W. Libbey		
	Edwin F. Lilley		
	Martin Lomasney	December 3, 1859	
	Paul I. Lombard		
	John E. Lyman	July 1, 1859	
	Herman A. MacDonald	November 11, 1881	
	James P. Maguire		
	John C. Mahoney		
	Joseph W. Martin Jr.	November 3, 1884	
	John F. McCarthy		
	Almiron J. McCulloch	October 29, 1847	
	Leo F. McCullough		
	Edward J. McDermott		
	James A. McElaney Jr.		
	John D. McGivern		
	Edward E. McGrath		
	James H. McInerney	December 13, 1871	
	Hugh M. McKay		
	Stewart H. McLeod		
	William M. McMorrow		
	Timothy J. Meade	November 7, 1874	
	John F. Meaney		
	Walter R. Meins	January 14, 1883	
	John Mitchell	September 4, 1877	
	Charles H. Morgan	January 15, 1869	
	Charles H. Morrill	October 6, 1874	
	Edward T. Morse		
	Frank Mulveny		
	John J. Murphy	March 26, 1889	
	James J. Murphy	February 11, 1885	
	David W. Murray	September 9, 1874	
	William J. Murray	October 7, 1885	
	William J. Naphen		
	Arthur N. Newhall		
	C. Augustus Norwood		
	William P. O'Brien		
	Charles R. O'Connell	September 16, 1874	
	Francis D. O'Donnell		
	William A. O'Hearn	March 8, 1887	
	J. Howard O'Keefe		
	Charles A. Orstrom		
	Charles B. Packard	January 29, 1858	
	Joseph H. Parker Jr.	April 16, 1871	
	Joseph A. Parks	May 2, 1877	
	Henry H. Parsons	August 11, 1866	
	Norman B. Parsons		
	Joseph H. Pendergast	December 9, 1879	
	Chauncey Pepin		
	Laurence S. Perry		
	Walter E. Piper	September 22, 1857	
	Frank H. Pope	March 7, 1854	
	Arthur Franklin Priest		
	Harry Bancroft Putnam	September 7, 1878	
	Martin Lewis Quinn	January 19, 1862	
	John E. Quinn		
	George Francis Reardon	February 2, 1878	
	Joseph J. Reed		
	Michael J. Reidy		
	Ralph R. Rideout		
	Louis O. Rieutord		
	John Lee Saltonstall	May 23, 1878	
	John C. Sanborn		
	Edgar E. Sargent		
	Frederick W. Schlapp		
	C. Burnside Seagrave		
	Alexander Sedgwick	1867	
	Benjamin Sharp	1858	
	John H. Sherburne	1877	
	Albert H. Silvester		
	Jerome S. Smith		
	Charles D. Smith		
	John G. Stevens		
	Waldo L. Stone		
	Henry M. Storm		
	William H. Sullivan	February 20, 1869	
	William J. Sullivan	April 14, 1865	
	Benjamin F. Sullivan		
	Edward A. Sweeney		
	Daniel W. Teehan		
	Alfred Tewksbury		
	Herbert E. Thompson		
	Eugene F. Toomey		
	Nathan A. Tufts	April 15, 1879	
	William D. Turner	October 22, 1866	
	James D. Tyler	June 15, 1848	
	E. Warren Tyler		
	Charles L. Underhill	July 20, 1867	
	John R. Wallace		
	Henry W. Warner	November 12, 1858	
	Robert M. Washburn	January 4, 1868	
	J. Thomas Webb	September 16, 1838	
	George Pearl Webster	January 9, 1877	
	Henry Gordon Wells	October 12, 1879	
	Thomas W. White	January 10, 1876	
	Isaac E. Willetts	November 8, 1879	
	Henry J. Winslow	June 27, 1880	
	Ernest A. Witt		
	Roger Wolcott	July 25, 1877	
	Charles J. Wood	March 18, 1854	
	Russell A. Wood		
	Norman P. Wood	July 30, 1846	
	Otis L. Wright	October 4, 1853	
	Henry D. Wright		

== See also ==
- 1912 Massachusetts gubernatorial election
- 62nd United States Congress
- List of Massachusetts General Courts
