= 1913 Massachusetts legislature =

134th Massachusetts General Court
←	133rd	135th	→

Overview
- Legislative body: General Court
- Election: November 5, 1912

Senate
- Members: 40
- President: Levi H. Greenwood
- Party control: Republican

House
- Members: 240
- Speaker: Grafton D. Cushing
- Party control: Republican

Sessions
- 1st: January 1, 1913 – June 20, 1913

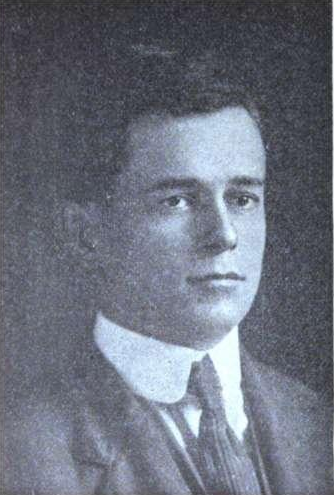
Levi Greenwood, Senate president.

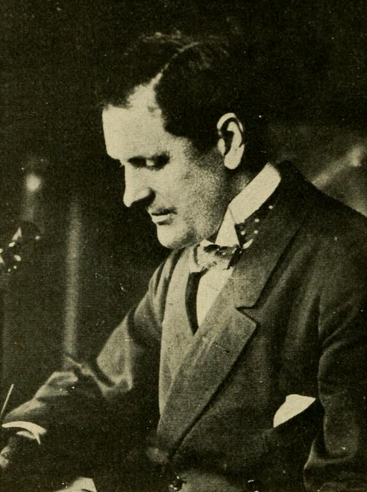
Grafton Cushing, House speaker.

Leaders of the Massachusetts General Court, 1913.

The 134th Massachusetts General Court, consisting of the Massachusetts Senate and the Massachusetts House of Representatives, met in 1913 during the governorship of Eugene Foss. Levi H. Greenwood served as president of the Senate and Grafton D. Cushing served as speaker of the House.

== Senators ==
image	name	date of birth	district
	Claude L. Allen		
	Edward C. R. Bagley		
	William A. L. Bazeley	1872	4th Worcester
	William A. Bellamy		
	Charles V. Blanchard	February 2, 1866	
	James Henry Brennan	December 21, 1888	
	Arthur Preston Chase	January 25, 1866	
	Ezra W. Clark	October 12, 1842	
	Calvin Coolidge	July 4, 1872	
	Henry J. Draper		
	Edric Eldridge		
	Wilton B. Fay		
	Edward Fisher		
	Redmond S. Fitzgerald		
	Julius Garst		
	Gurdon W. Gordon		
	Levi H. Greenwood	December 22, 1872	
	Dennis E. Halley		
	Frederic M. Hersey		
	William P. Hickey	November 17, 1871	
	Frederic H. Hilton		
	Clarence Whitman Hobbs Jr.	October 1, 1878	
	Francis J. Horgan		
	Charles Cabot Johnson	December 9, 1876	
	Thomas Martin Joyce		
	John H. Mack		
	Charles F. McCarthy	August 15, 1876	
	John J. McDevitt		
	Philip J. McGonagle	October 21, 1871	
	Walter E. McLane		
	David T. Montague		
	C. Augustus Norwood		
	Francis X. Quigley	November 20, 1882	
	Samuel Ross	February 2, 1865	
	Harry N. Stearns	October 5, 1874	
	James P. Timilty	March 28, 1865	
	Charles E. Ward		
	Henry Gordon Wells	October 12, 1879	
	William H. Wheeler		
	Lombard Williams		

== Representatives ==
image	name	date of birth	district
	Essex S. Abbott		3rd Essex
	Henry Achin Jr.	June 30, 1883	
	Timothy J. Ahern		
	John A. Anderson		
	Henry L. Andrews		
	Charles H. Annis	January 12, 1869	
	Oscar E. Arkwell		
	William M. Armstrong	August 17, 1850	
	Charles N. Atwood		
	George W. P. Babb		
	James J. Bacigalupo		
	Freelon Q. Ball		
	John Ballantyne	July 9, 1869	
	Clarence A. Barnes	August 28, 1882	
	Joseph L. Barry		
	James F. Barry	December 4, 1857	
	John E. Beck	May 10, 1869	
	Everett E. Belding	February 15, 1879	
	Joseph J. Benson		
	Enos H. Bigelow		
	Alvin E. Bliss		
	Charles M. Blodgett		
	Edward C. Bodfish		
	William Booth	June 21, 1862	
	Henry E. Bothfeld	March 4, 1859	
	Patrick H. Boyle	December 20, 1850	
	Alvah J. Bradstreet		
	James J. Brennan	May 2, 1882	
	John P. Brennan	March 1, 1876	
	Vincent Brogna		
	Michael J. Brophy		
	Daniel J. Buckley		
	John P. Buckley	May 31, 1853	
	John H. Buckley	July 27, 1863	
	Morton Henry Burdick		
	Frederick H. Burke		
	James D. Burns	July 4, 1876	
	Otis W. Butler		
	Matthew J. Carbary		
	Julius F. Carman	August 7, 1861	
	William E. Carney	January 16, 1878	
	Maurice Caro		
	Patrick B. Carr		
	Andrew A. Casassa		
	Thomas J. Casey		
	Allison G. Catheron	June 26, 1878	
	George Dudley Chamberlain		
	Cleaveland A. Chandler		
	Daniel J. Chapman	January 18, 1878	
	John W. Churchill	November 17, 1853	
	Albert B. Clark		
	M. Sumner Coggan		
	Samuel I. Collins	March 4, 1851	
	John J. Conway		
	D. Herbert Cook	June 2, 1851	
	Michael H. Cotter		
	Arthur J. Coughlan		
	John J. Courtney		
	Walter D. Cowls		
	Channing H. Cox	October 28, 1879	
	Joseph Craig		
	John J. Creed		
	Courtenay Crocker	February 4, 1881	
	Patrick J. Curley		
	John A. Curtin	April 3, 1870	
	Grafton D. Cushing	August 4, 1864	
	Edward N. Dahlborg		
	George T. Daly		
	Albert M. Darling		
	Edward Davies		
	Charles A. Dean	March 26, 1856	
	John F. Doherty	June 9, 1881	
	William H. Dolben	January 23, 1878	
	Peter J. Donaghue		
	John L. Donovan	June 3, 1876	
	James H. Donovan		
	John J. Douglass	February 9, 1873	
	Andrew P. Doyle	August 15, 1869	
	George P. Drury		
	Eli J. Ducharme		
	William S. Duncan		
	John F. Dwyer		
	Harry Millett Eames		
	Frederick W. Eaton		
	Charles W. Eldridge	October 16, 1877	
	George H. Ellis	October 3, 1848	
	Frank S. Farnsworth		
	George W. Faulkner	January 24, 1874	
	John G. Faxon		
	Charles H. Felker		
	John B. Fellows		
	Frederick B. Felton		
	James H. Ferguson		
	Benjamin Ferring		
	James R. Ferry		
	Alfred N. Fessenden		
	William A. Fisher		
	Daniel Fitzpatrick		
	John T. Flanagan	May 25, 1869	
	Elmer G. Fosgate		
	James Eugene Fowle	November 22, 1880	
	John J. Gallagher		
	Thomas J. Giblin		
	Charles L. Gifford	March 15, 1871	
	Isaac Gordon		
	Frederic J. Grady		
	William J. Graham	October 2, 1873	
	Arthur G. Greaney		
	Fred Parker Greenwood		
	James F. Griffin	January 19, 1884	
	William N. Hackett		
	Benjamin F. Haines	November 25, 1876	
	Edward M. Hall		
	Leonard F. Hardy		
	Edward F. Harrington (state representative)	August 10, 1878	
	Stephen H. Harrington		
	James L. Harrop		
	George F. Hart	November 9, 1859	
	Edward R. Hathaway		
	George H. W. Hayes		
	Martin Hays	October 14, 1876	
	Michael A. Henebery		
	Ira G. Hersey		
	Francis M. Hill		
	Timothy J. Horan		
	John B. Hull Jr.	July 17, 1871	
	Frederick W. Hurlburt		
	James M. Hurley		
	Victor Francis Jewett		
	Michael S. Keenan		
	Michael Kelly	June 17, 1840	
	William W. Kennard		
	William S. Kinney		
	Louis LaCroix		
	Charles S. Lawler		
	Francis X. Le Boeuf		
	Joseph Leonard		
	William J. Leslie		
	George W. Libbey		
	Martin Lomasney	December 3, 1859	
	William J. Look	June 20, 1867	
	Frederick H. Lucke		
	John J. Lydon		
	James P. Maguire		
	John C. Mahoney		
	Henry J. Mahoney		
	Daniel C. Manning		
	George E. Mansfield		
	Joseph W. Martin Jr.	November 3, 1884	
	John L. Mather		
	John F. McCarthy		
	Leo F. McCullough		
	Edward J. McDermott		
	Michael J. McEttrick	June 22, 1848	
	Michael F. McGrath		
	Edward E. McGrath		
	Edward F. McLaughlin	June 6, 1883	
	P. Joseph McManus		
	Timothy J. Meade	November 7, 1874	
	John F. Meaney		
	John Mitchell	September 4, 1877	
	Charles H. Morgan	January 15, 1869	
	Charles H. Morrill	October 6, 1874	
	J. Warren Moulton		
	Frank Mulveny		
	John J. Murphy	March 26, 1889	
	Dennis A. Murphy	September 26, 1876	
	Patrick E. Murray	August 22, 1869	
	William J. Naphen		
	Parker H. Nason		
	Arthur N. Newhall		
	Edward H. Nutting	July 6, 1869	
	William P. O'Brien		
	J. Howard O'Keefe		
	Jeremiah O'Leary		
	Charles A. Orstrom		
	Joseph H. Parker Jr.	April 16, 1871	
	Henry H. Parsons	August 11, 1866	
	Norman B. Parsons		
	Frank D. Peirce		
	Chauncey Pepin		
	Laurence S. Perry		
	Horace H. Piper		
	William H. Poole		
	Almon L. Pratt		
	Arthur Franklin Priest		
	Winfield F. Prime	November 22, 1860	
	Harry Bancroft Putnam	September 7, 1878	
	John E. Quinn		
	Louis O. Rieutord		
	Robert Robinson	January 4, 1889	
	William M. Robinson	July 21, 1875	
	Walter F. Russell		
	John C. Sanborn		
	Clifford B. Sanborn		
	Frederick W. Schlapp		
	Henry H. Sears		
	William J. Sessions	December 18, 1859	
	Benjamin Sharp	1858	
	Herbert N. Shepard		
	John H. Sherburne	1877	
	Jerome S. Smith		
	Ralph M. Smith		
	Charles D. Smith		
	Henry B. Spencer		
	John G. Stevens		
	John H. Stone		
	Merrill E. Streeter		
	Lewis R. Sullivan		
	William J. Sullivan	April 14, 1865	
	Benjamin F. Sullivan		
	Michael T. Sullivan		
	Thomas D. Sullivan		
	Peter Francis Tague	June 4, 1871	
	Samuel L. Taylor		
	Herbert E. Thompson		
	Eugene F. Toomey		
	Nathan A. Tufts	April 15, 1879	
	E. Warren Tyler		
	Charles L. Underhill	July 20, 1867	
	John M. Vincent		
	John R. Wallace		
	Joseph E. Warner	May 16, 1884	
	Robert M. Washburn	January 4, 1868	
	Charles H. Waterman		
	George Pearl Webster	January 9, 1877	
	Charles H. Webster		
	Thomas W. White	January 10, 1876	
	Charles H. Williams		
	Herbert A. Wilson	November 27, 1870	
	Thomas E. P. Wilson		
	Clarence J. Wing		
	Judson I. Wood		
	George M. Worrall		
	Henry D. Wright		
	George L. Wright		
	Windsor H. Wyman		

== See also ==
- Massachusetts 1913 law
- 1913 Massachusetts gubernatorial election
- 63rd United States Congress
- List of Massachusetts General Courts
