= 1914 Massachusetts gubernatorial election =

- November 3, 1914
- Turnout: 13.61% ▼0.8
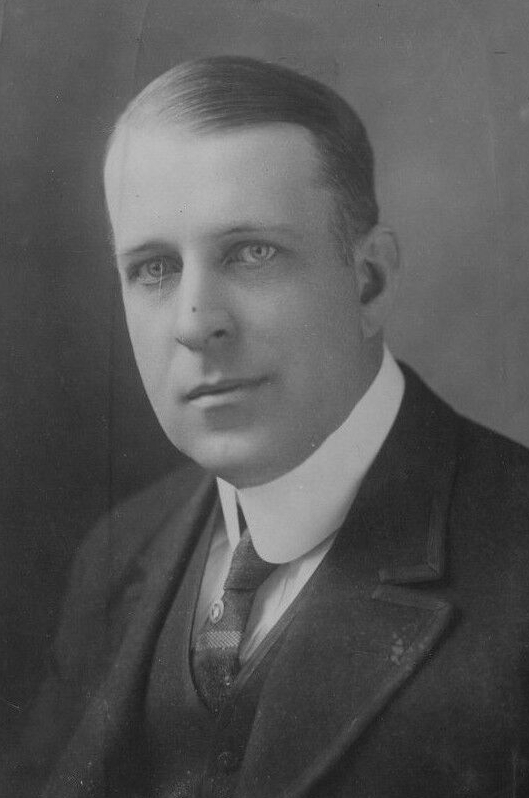

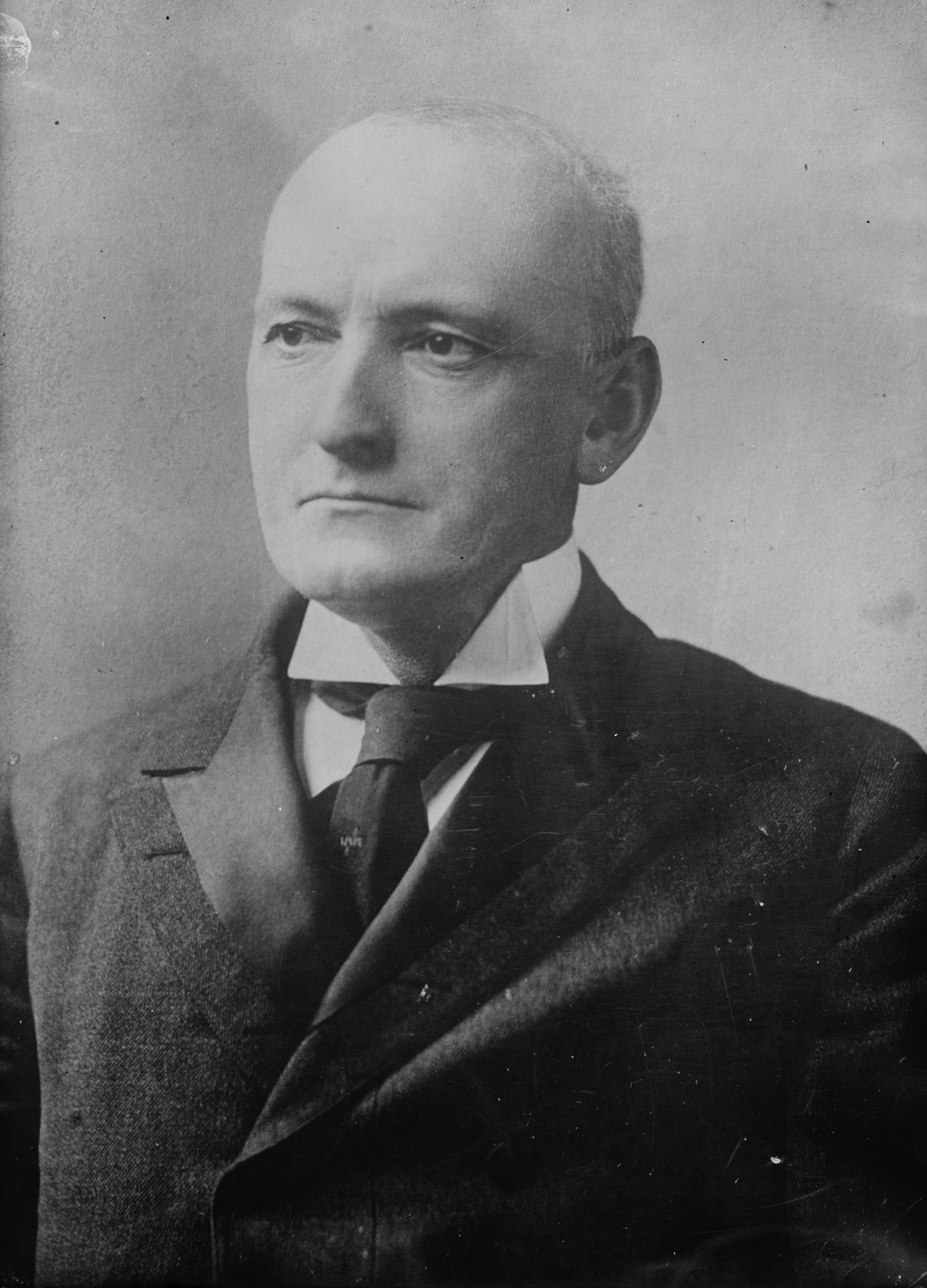

Nominee	David I. Walsh	Samuel W. McCall	Joseph Walker
Party	Democratic	Republican	Progressive
Popular vote	210,442	198,627	32,145
Percentage	45.93%	43.35%	7.02%
- Walsh: 30-40% 40-50% 50–60% 60–70% 70–80% McCall: 40-50% 50–60% 60–70% 70–80% 80–90% Walker: 30-40% 40-50% Tie: 30-40% 40-50%
Governor before election
David I. Walsh
Democratic
Elected Governor
David I. Walsh
Democratic

The 1914 Massachusetts gubernatorial election took place on November 3, 1914. Democratic Governor David I. Walsh defeated the Republican, Samuel W. McCall, and the Progressive, Joseph Walker, and won reelection with 45.93% of the vote.

== Democratic primary ==
=== Governor ===
==== Candidates ====
- David I. Walsh, incumbent governor

==== Results ====
Governor Walsh was unopposed for re-nomination.

1914 Democratic gubernatorial primary
Party	Candidate	Votes	%
Democratic	David Walsh (incumbent)	76,834	99.98%
Write-in	All others	19	0.02%
Total votes		76,853	100.00%

=== Lt. governor ===
==== Candidates ====
- Edward P. Barry, incumbent lieutenant governor

==== Results ====
1914 Democratic lieutenant gubernatorial primary
Party	Candidate	Votes	%
Democratic	Edward P. Barry (incumbent)	74,748	99.98%
Write-in	All others	13	0.02%
Total votes		74,761	100.00%

== Republican primary ==
=== Governor ===
==== Candidates ====
- Samuel McCall, U.S. representative from Massachusetts's 8th congressional district

=== Results ===
McCall was unopposed for the Republican nomination.

1914 Republican gubernatorial primary
Party	Candidate	Votes	%
Republican	Samuel W. McCall	69,274	99.95%
Write-in	All others	41	0.05%
Total votes		69,315	100.00%

=== Lt. governor ===
==== Candidates ====
- Grafton D. Cushing, speaker of the Massachusetts House of Representatives
- August H. Goetting, former member of the Massachusetts Governor's Council (1908–1913) and chairman of the Massachusetts Republican State Committee (1897–1902); nominee for lieutenant governor in 1913
- Elmer A. Stevens, treasurer and receiver-general of Massachusetts

=== Results ===
1914 Republican lieutenant gubernatorial primary
Party	Candidate	Votes	%
Republican	Grafton D. Cushing	40,634	53.67%
Republican	August H. Goetting	22,541	29.77%
Republican	Elmer A. Stevens	12,526	16.54%
Write-in	All others	9	0.12%
Total votes		75,710	100.00%

== Progressive primary ==
=== Governor ===
==== Candidates ====
- Joseph H. Walker, former speaker of the Massachusetts House of Representatives

==== Results ====
Walker was unopposed for the nomination.

1914 Progressive gubernatorial primary
Party	Candidate	Votes	%
Progressive	Joseph H. Walker	5,237	99.99%
Write-in	All others	7	0.01%
Total votes		5,244	100.00%

=== Lt. Governor ===
==== Candidates ====
- James P. Magenis, delegate to the 1912 Republican National Convention

==== Results ====
Magenis was unopposed for the Progressive nomination.

1914 Progressive gubernatorial primary
Party	Candidate	Votes	%
Progressive	James P. Magenis	4,896	99.61%
Write-in	All others	19	0.39%
Total votes		4,915	100.00%

== General election ==
=== Candidates ===
- Alfred H. Evans, nominee for governor in 1913 (Prohibition)
- Samuel McCall, U.S. representative from Winchester (Republican)
- Arthur Reimer, candidate for president of the United States in 1912 and governor in 1913 (Socialist Labor)
- Samuel C. Roberts (Socialist)
- Joseph H. Walker, former speaker of the Massachusetts House of Representatives (Progressive)
- David I. Walsh, incumbent governor (Democratic)

=== Results ===
Massachusetts gubernatorial election, 1914
Party	Candidate	Votes	%
Democratic	David I. Walsh (incumbent)	210,442	45.93%
Republican	Samuel W. McCall	198,627	43.35%
Progressive	Joseph Walker	32,145	7.02%
Socialist	Samuel C. Roberts	9,520	2.08%
Prohibition	Alfred H. Evans	5,264	1.15%
Socialist Labor	Arthur Elmer Reimer	2,205	0.48%
Total votes		458,203	100%

== See also ==
- 1914 Massachusetts legislature

== Bibliography ==
- Office of the Secretary of the Commonwealth (1914). Election Statistics, 1914. Boston, MA.
