= Jacob Bitzer =

American politician (1865–1946)

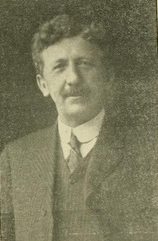
- Bitzer c. 1919

Member of the Massachusetts House of Representatives from the 27th Middlesex district
- In office 1915–1919
- Preceded by: Winfield F. Prime
- Succeeded by: Charles C. Warren

Member of the Arlington, Massachusetts Board of Selectmen
- In office 1910–1914

Personal details
- Born: January 16, 1865 Dürrwangen, Kingdom of Württemberg
- Died: February 19, 1946 (aged 81) Arlington, Massachusetts, U.S.
- Party: Republican
- Education: Cutter School
- Occupation: Assistant superintendent of the Schwamb Mill; Real Estate

Jacob Bitzer (January 16, 1865 – February 19, 1946) was an American businessman, real estate agent, and politician who served as a member of the Massachusetts House of Representatives.

== Early life ==
Bitzer was born to John and Dorothea (Beck) Bitzer on January 16, 1865, in Dürrwangen, Kingdom of Württemberg.

=== Education ===
Bitzer attended the Cutter School in Arlington, Massachusetts, graduating in 1879.

== Business career ==
After he graduated from the Cutter School, Bitzer started a six-year apprentice working for the Welch & Griffiths saw works in Arlington. At the end of his apprenticeship the company went out of business. After he left the employ of Welch & Griffiths Bitzer went to work as a mill hand, on an irregular moulding machine, in the mill of Theodore Schwamb, a manufacturer of piano cases.

In 1897, when the Schwamb Mill was incorporated, Bitzer became a stockholder, and clerk of the corporation. In 1908 Bitzer was the assistant superintendent of the mill in charge of the mill department.

== Republican National Convention ==
Bitzer was an alternative delegate to the Republican National Convention of 1912.

== Massachusetts House of Representatives ==
On November 3, 1914, Bitzer was elected a member of the Massachusetts House of Representatives representing the twenty seventh Middlesex District, Bitzer received 1,372 in a three way race that included fellow Arlington Resident Cyrus Edwin Dallin; James F. McCarthy of Lexington, Massachusetts. Bitzer served in the legislature from 1915 to 1919. During the 1917 legislative session Bitzer was a member of the Committee on Public Institutions, and the Committee on Ways and Means.

== See also ==
- 1915 Massachusetts legislature
- 1916 Massachusetts legislature
- 1917 Massachusetts legislature
- 1918 Massachusetts legislature
- 1919 Massachusetts legislature

Political offices
Preceded by Winfield F. Prime	Member of the Massachusetts House of Representatives; 27th Middlesex district 1915-1919	Succeeded by Charles C. Warren
