= Dexter Fellows =

American showman and circus press agent (1871–1937)

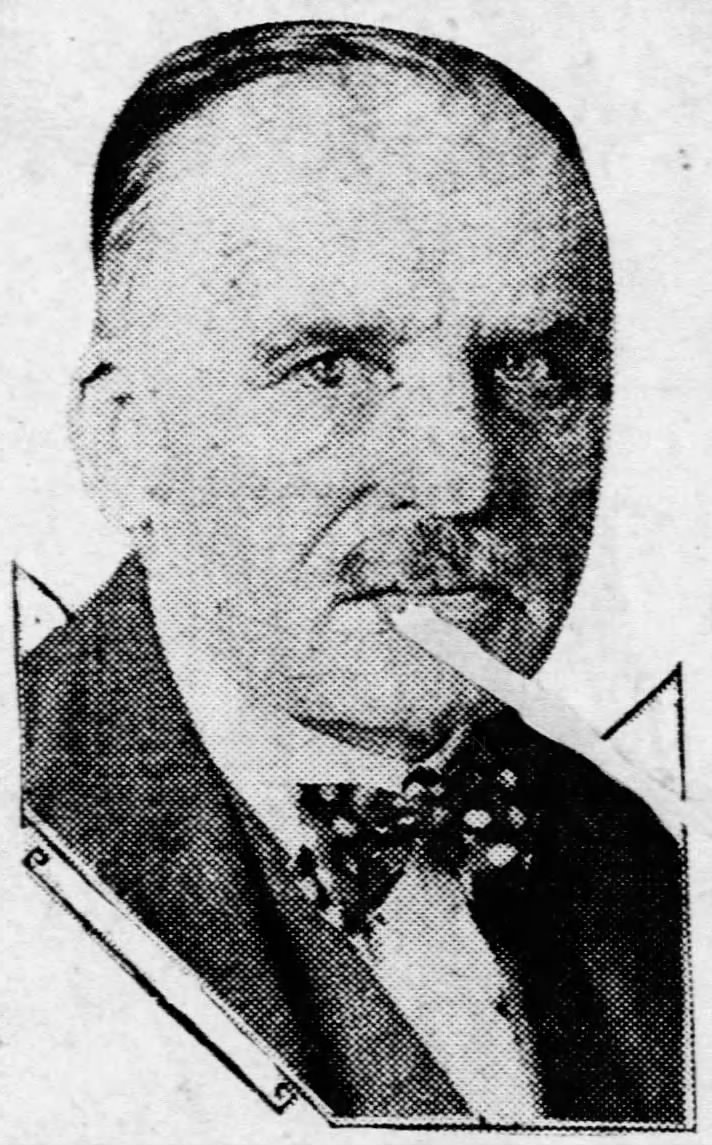
- Born: Dexter William Fellows; 1871; Boston, Massachusetts, U.S.
- Died: November 26, 1937 (aged 65–66); Hattiesburg, Mississippi, U.S.
- Other names: Dean of Circus Press Agents
- Occupations: Showman; press agent
- Employer: Ringling Bros. and Barnum & Bailey Circus
- Relatives: John B. Fellows (brother)
- Awards: Circus Hall of Fame (1965)

Dexter Fellows (1871 – November 26, 1937) was an American showman and circus press agent for the Ringling Bros. and Barnum & Bailey Circus who was inducted into the Circus Hall of Fame in 1965.

== Early life ==
Dexter William Fellows was born on July 26, 1871, in Boston, Massachusetts, United States. His name came from the famed racehorse Dexter and a beloved uncle named William.

Dexter's father was a native of Nova Scotia, and his mother was from a New England Puritan background.

As a child, he moved to Fitchburg, Massachusetts, with his family. Growing up, he attended Buffalo Bill's Wild West show during a stop in Fitchburg. He had the privilege of holding the reins of the horse belonging to Buck Taylor, the king of the cowboys.

== Circus life ==
When a Pawnee Bill show arrived in town seeking men "to work on the program," Fellows wrote a letter to William H. Gardiner calling himself the "best program man" in the nation. He was soon invited to join the show in Hagerstown, Maryland. He started as press agent for Pawnee Bill's Original Wild West show at the age of 23. At $20 a week, he publicized the activities of "bronco busters, bearded ladies, sword swallowers, and trapeze artists." He held the role from 1893 to 1894.

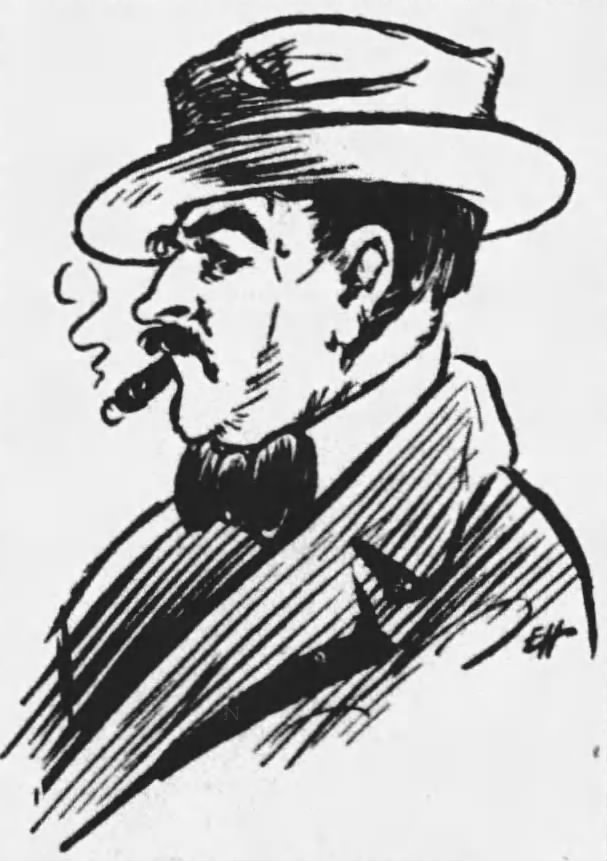
Sketch of Dexter Fellows c. 1926

Fellows left his previous post in 1894 to join Buffalo Bill's Wild West and Congress of Rough Riders of the World, a move that took him to Europe. He spent eleven years working alongside Buffalo Bill. He traveled abroad with the show to England, where he discontinued his work at Burton upon Trent in 1903.

Returning to the United States, he moved on to the Ringling Brothers Circus, where he spent a single season in 1905.

In 1906, during the summer, Dexter Fellows succeeded Dan W. Fishell and joined Barnum & Bailey, the "greatest show on earth," under James A. Bailey. Following the 1919 merger of the Ringling Brothers show and Barnum & Bailey, he was retained as a press agent for the Ringling Bros. and Barnum & Bailey Circus. From early spring to late October, Dexter Fellows was on the road ahead of the circus, starting with its New York debut. Every year, he traveled about 15,000 miles, moving either in advance of the show or alongside the main troupe.

By 1933, his career as a circus press agent had spanned three decades.

On his way to the circus winter quarters in Sarasota in 1937, he became sick in Oklahoma, pushed on to New Orleans, and was later hospitalized in Hattiesburg.

== Personal life ==
Fellows married Signe von Breitholtz in 1913.

== Death ==
Dexter W. Fellows died in Hattiesburg, Mississippi, United States, on November 26, 1937, at 66.

His remains were brought back to New Britain, Connecticut, and at Fairview Cemetery, Dexter Fellows is buried beneath a large circus tent-shaped monument adorned with an elaborate elephant.

== Legacy ==
In 1933, Damon Runyon wrote, "He is accounted one of the greatest circus press agents that ever lived."

His autobiography, This Way To The Big Show: The Life of Dexter W. Fellows, was published in 1936, a year before his death.

Dexter Fellows was inducted into the International Circus Hall of Fame in 1965.
