= A. H. Goetting =

American politician and judge (1856–1920)

Member of the Massachusetts Governor's Council for the 8th district
- In office 1908–1913
- Preceded by: Franklin W. Russell
- Succeeded by: Henry L. Bowles

Chairman of the Massachusetts Republican State Committee
- In office 1897–1902
- Preceded by: Eben Sumner Draper
- Succeeded by: John Davis Long

Personal details
- Born: January 2, 1856 New York, New York, U.S.
- Died: October 3, 1920 (aged 64) Springfield, Massachusetts, U.S.
- Party: Republican

August H. Goetting (January 2, 1856 – October 3, 1920) was an American politician who was chairman of the Massachusetts Republican state committee from 1897 to 1902 and a member of the Massachusetts Governor's Council from 1908 to 1913. He was the Republican Party nominee for Lieutenant Governor of Massachusetts in 1913.

== Biography ==
Goetting was born in New York City on January 2, 1856. His first political experience came in Brooklyn, where he helped get Seth Low elected Mayor. Goetting was a delegate to the 1880 Republican National Convention from New York. He subsequently moved to Springfield, Massachusetts, where he engaged in the paper business. He later started a music publishing business and was involved in real estate development. He was chairman of the Republican city committee during the 1884 United States presidential election. In 1889, he was elected to the Republican state committee. He was chairman of the Massachusetts Republican Party's finance committee during the 1896 United States presidential election. He was elected chairman of the Republican state committee in 1897 and was reelected every year until his retirement in 1902.

Goetting was assistant quartermaster general on the military staff of Governor John Q. A. Brackett in 1891 and assistant adjutant general on the staff of Frederic T. Greenhalge in 1895 and 1896.

Goetting was a candidate for Lieutenant Governor of Massachusetts in 1905. He lost the Republican nomination at party convention to Eben Sumner Draper, who, needing 762 votes, secured victory on the first ballot with 890 votes to Goetting's 328 and Fred S. Hall's 303.

Goetting was elected to the Massachusetts Governor's Council in 1908 and was appointed early on November 25 to fill a vacancy. He was elected to five consecutive terms, retiring in 1913 to once again run for Lieutenant Governor. He was unopposed in the Republican primary, but lost the general election to Edward P. Barry 175,984 votes to 150,228 as part of a Democratic sweep of statewide offices. Goetting ran again in 1914, but lost in the Republican primary to Speaker of the Massachusetts House of Representatives Grafton D. Cushing. With Cushing running for governor in 1915, it was expected that Goetting would once again run for Lieutenant Governor. However, on July 30, 1915, he announced that he would not be a candidate in that year's election. This move solidified votes from Western Massachusetts behind Calvin Coolidge.

Goetting died on October 3, 1920 at his home in Springfield from a "heart dilation".

Party political offices
Preceded by Robert Luce	Republican nominee for Lieutenant Governor of Massachusetts; 1913	Succeeded by Grafton D. Cushing
