= John B. Fellows =

American politician (1878–1943)

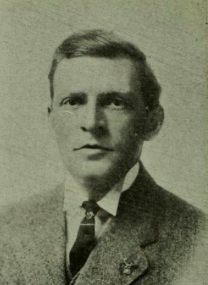
- Fellows as a member of the Massachusetts House of Representatives

Mayor of Fitchburg, Massachusetts
- In office 1921–1925
- Preceded by: Frank H. Foss
- Succeeded by: Joseph H. Delaney

Member of the Massachusetts House of Representatives from the 12th Worcester District
- In office 1912–1913

Personal details
- Born: August 13, 1878 Fitchburg, Massachusetts, U.S.
- Died: May 6, 1943 (aged 64) Fitchburg, Massachusetts, U.S.
- Party: Republican
- Relatives: Dexter Fellows (brother)

John Benjamin Fellows (August 13, 1878 – May 6, 1943) was an American politician who was a member of the Massachusetts House of Representatives from 1912 to 1913 and mayor of Fitchburg, Massachusetts from 1921 to 1925.

== Early life ==
Fellows was born in Fitchburg on August 13, 1878. His father, John I. Fellows, immigrated to the United States from Canada and worked as a druggist in Massachusetts for over fifty years. One of his brothers was Ringling Bros. and Barnum & Bailey Circus publicist Dexter Fellows. Outside of politics, Fellows worked as a bank teller.

== Politics ==
Fellows represented the 12th Worcester district in the Massachusetts House of Representatives in the 1912 and 1913 Massachusetts legislatures. He did not run for reelection in 1913, but was elected to the Massachusetts Republican state committee. From 1921 to 1925, he was mayor of Fitchburg. He was appointed city treasurer in 1928 and held the position until his death on May 6, 1943. He was survived by his wife and five of his children. One of his sons, John B. Fellows Jr., was awarded the Silver Star Medal for gallantry during the Battle of Kula Gulf.
