= James V. Bennett =

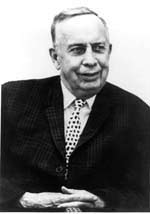

2nd Director of the Federal Bureau of Prisons
- In office 1937–1964
- Preceded by: Sanford Bates
- Succeeded by: Myrl E. Alexander

Personal details
- Born: August 29, 1894 Silver Creek, New York, U.S.
- Died: November 19, 1978 (aged 84)

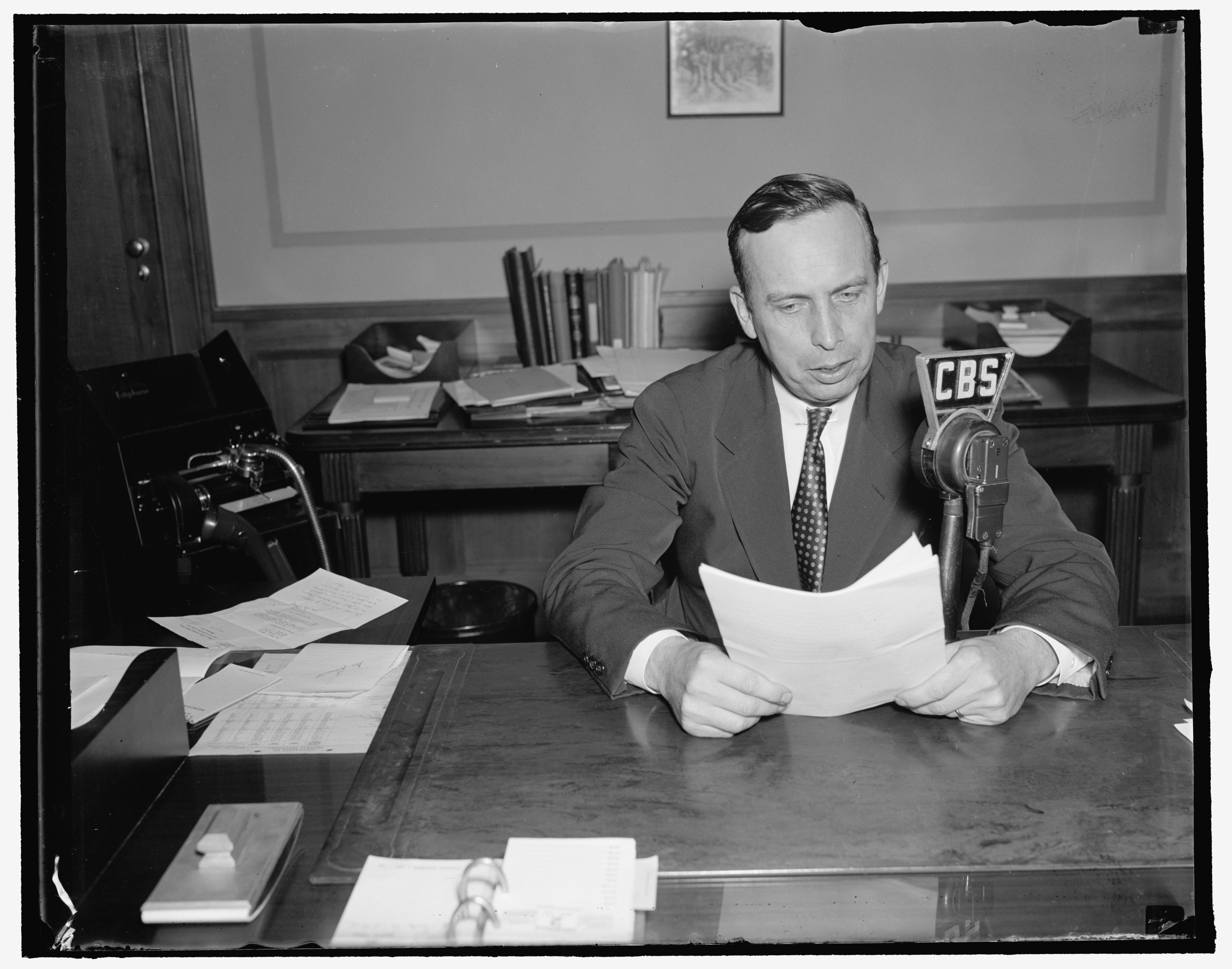
Bennett in 1937

James Van Benschoten Bennett (August 29, 1894, in Silver Creek, New York, United States – November 19, 1978) was a leading American penal reformer and prison administrator who served as director of the Federal Bureau of Prisons (BOP) from 1937 to 1964.

== Career ==
A U.S. Army Air Corps veteran from World War I, Bennett became an Investigator for the U.S. Bureau of Efficiency in 1919 while studying law in night school at George Washington University. In 1928, he authored "The Federal Penal and Correctional Problem," a study that called for a number of reforms to the U.S. prison system whose population and responsibilities had expanded considerably with the enforcement of Prohibition. Bennett's study eventually led to the creation of the Bureau of Prisons, which was originally run by Sanford Bates, the commissioner of the Massachusetts Department of Corrections.

Bennett argued that U.S. prisons were inhumane and poorly operated and that extensive reform was needed in order to make them viable agents of rehabilitation. From as early as 1939 he was a strong critic of Alcatraz Federal Penitentiary. During the 1950s he was an advocate in the movement to persuade Congress to close Alcatraz and replace it with a new maximum-security prison. He was also a long-time opponent of capital punishment, pushed for the expansion of vocational training in prisons, and sought to expand probation and reentry services for incarcerated people.

Bennett was a prominent member of numerous U.S. delegations to the International Penal and Penitentiary Congress and the United Nations' Congress on the Prevention of Crime and President of many institutions such as the National Association for Better Broadcasting and American Correctional Association (ACA), and was chairman of the American Bar Association Section on Criminal Law.

Beginning on August 11, 1943, eighteen conscientious objectors of World War II at the Danbury Correctional Institution in Connecticut, went on a 135-day work strike to end Jim Crow in the prison dining room. The strike ended on December 22, 1943, after the warden promised to initiate an integration policy starting February 1, 1944. He wrote to Lowell Naeve, a Danbury prisoner involved in the work strike for integration, charging him with resorting to "undemocratic methods of coercion to force a change." Bennett also denounced the tactics used by pacifists in prison. "Strikes, boycotts, and civil disobedience," he argued, "certainly are not the democratic method of accomplishing the solution of racial problems. They merely engender discord and race riots." Bennett and the Bureau of Prisons were among the first federal agencies to push forward with integration, and he denounced penal segregation, especially those rooted in “southern practices or customs." Despite opposition, Bennett held the line on this policy of desegregation. “I don't know whether you are a southern institution or not,” he explained to one warden in Virginia who had complained about the recent changes. “You are first and last and all the time a federal institution and your race problems have got to be in accordance with those of the Bureau regardless of the views of any of your good friends, neighbors or the personnel.”
