= List of mayors of Newton, Massachusetts =

This is a list of the past and present mayors of Newton, Massachusetts.

| No. | Mayor | Picture | Term |
|---|---|---|---|
| 1 | James F. C. Hyde | | 1874–1875 |
| 2 | Alden Speare | | 1876–1877 |
| 3 | William Bentley Fowle Jr. | | 1878–1879 |
| 4 | Royal M. Pulsifer | | 1880–1881 |
| 5 | William P. Ellison | | 1882–1883 |
| 6 | J. Wesley Kimball | | 1884–1885 |
| 7 | Heman Burr | | 1889–1890 |
| 8 | Hermon E Hibbard | | 1891–1892 |
| 9 | John A. Fenno | | 1893–1894 |
| 10 | Henry E. Bothfeld | | 1895 |
| 11 | Henry E. Cobb | | 1896–1898 |
| 12 | Edward B. Wilson | | 1899–1900 |
| 13 | Edward L. Pickard | | 1901 |
| 14 | John W. Weeks | | 1902–1903 |
| 15 | Alonzo R. Weed | | 1904–1905 |
| 16 | Edgar W. Warren | | 1906–1907 |
| 17 | George Hutchinson | | 1908–1909 |
| 18 | Charles E. Hatfield | | 1910–1913 |
| 19 | Edwin O. Childs | | 1914–1929 |
| 20 | Sinclair Weeks | | 1930–1935 |
| 21 | Edwin O. Childs | | 1936–1939 |
| 22 | Paul M. Goddard | | 1940–1947 |
| 23 | Theodore R. Lockwood | | 1948–1953 |
| 24 | Howard J. Whitmore Jr. | | 1954–1959 |
| 25 | Donald L. Gibbs | | 1960–1965 |
| 26 | Monte G. Basbas | | 1966–1971 |
| 27 | Theodore D. Mann | | 1972–1994 |
| 28 | Thomas Concannon Jr. | | 1994–1997 |
| 29 | David B. Cohen | | 1998–2009 |
| 30 | Setti Warren | | 2010–2018 |
| 31 | Ruthanne Fuller | | 2018–2025 |
| 32 | Marc Laredo | | 2026-Present |
