= James F. C. Hyde =

American politician

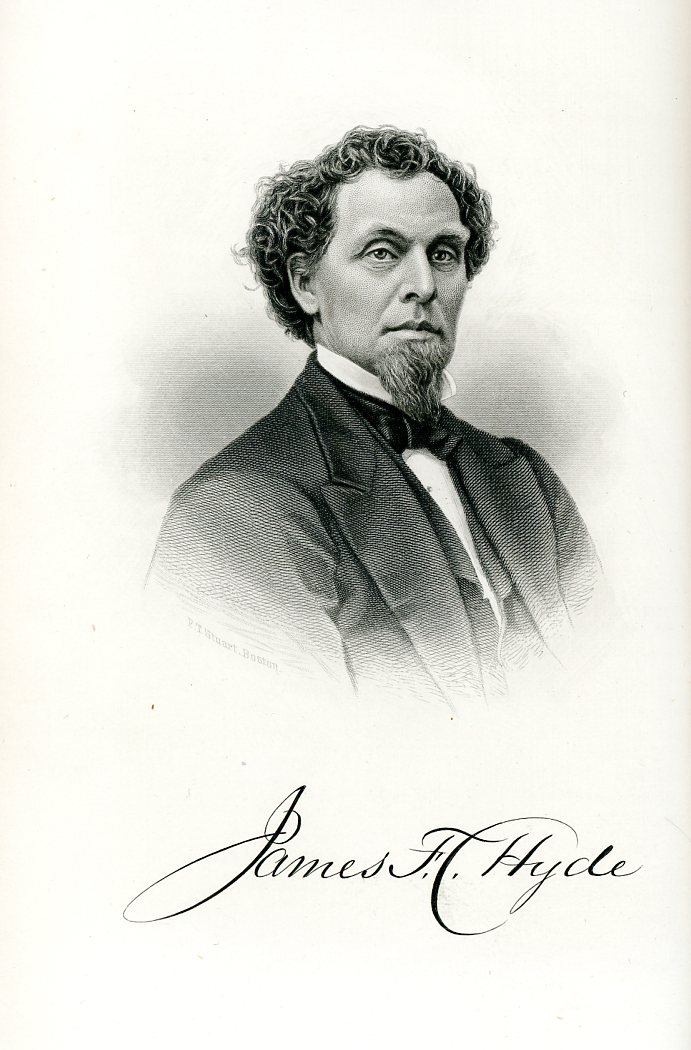

1st Mayor of Newton, Massachusetts
- In office 1874–1875
- Preceded by: Board of Selectmen
- Succeeded by: Alden Speare

Personal details
- Born: July 26, 1825 Newton, Massachusetts
- Died: May 2, 1898 (aged 72) Newton Highlands, Massachusetts
- Spouse(s): Sophia Stone, 1854, (d. 1860); Emily Ward, m. 1861.
- Children: Clarice S. Hyde; Elliott J. Hyde; Mary E. Hyde; Frank C. Hyde

James Francis Clark Hyde (July 26, 1825 – May 2, 1898) was a Massachusetts politician who was the first mayor of Newton, Massachusetts, USA.

Born in 1825, James Francis Clark Hyde was the seventh in line of descent from Newton's fifth permanent settler, Jonathan Hyde (whose first wife Mary died in 1672, marked by the oldest grave-marker in the old burying ground on Centre Street in Newton). Hyde was mayor for two terms and was selectman for sixteen years, as well as a member of the school committee, a trial judge and a justice of the peace. He was a founding member in 1872 of the Newton Highlands Congregational Society and was a deacon for 25 years.

He was a director of the Newton National Bank. In order to bring public transport options to the growing suburbs, he was an active proponent of the Highland branch of the Circuit Railway which opened in Newton Highlands in 1886.

While his professional interests were mainly in banking and insurance, Hyde was also intrigued by botany. He demonstrated an avid interest in experiments in cultivation at the Walnut Grove Nursery, which had been started by his father James at their property at the corner of Centre and Cushing Streets, between Newton Highlands and Newton Centre. He chaired the Fruit Committee of the Massachusetts Horticultural Society and was president of that society for several years. In 1857, he published a paper on growing, harvesting and distilling sorghum, a gluten-free grain. This crop became popular for cultivation by abolitionists and free state farmers as an alternative sugar source without relying on plantation methods.

A few years before his death, a school named in his honor was built on Lincoln Street, in Newton Highlands, opening in 1895, and designed by architects Hartwell and Richardson. The Hyde Grammar School was in a distinctly Romanesque style, with a broad slate hipped roof, projecting pavilions and round arched entrances. Texture was added through the decoration of bold patterns in red and buff brickwork on the front façade. A second substantial school building, the Hyde School Annex, was added in 1907 designed in a neo-classical style by the architects Coolidge & Carlson. Following a fire in April 1981 which destroyed the distinctive roof of the original school, the building was substantially renovated and converted to housing. The gymnasium built in 1967 is now called the Hyde Community Center.

== Notes ==
Political offices
Preceded by Board of Selectmen	1st Mayor of Newton, Massachusetts; 1874– 1875	Succeeded by Alden Speare
