= Frank H. Foss =

American politician (1865–1947)

Frank Herbert Foss
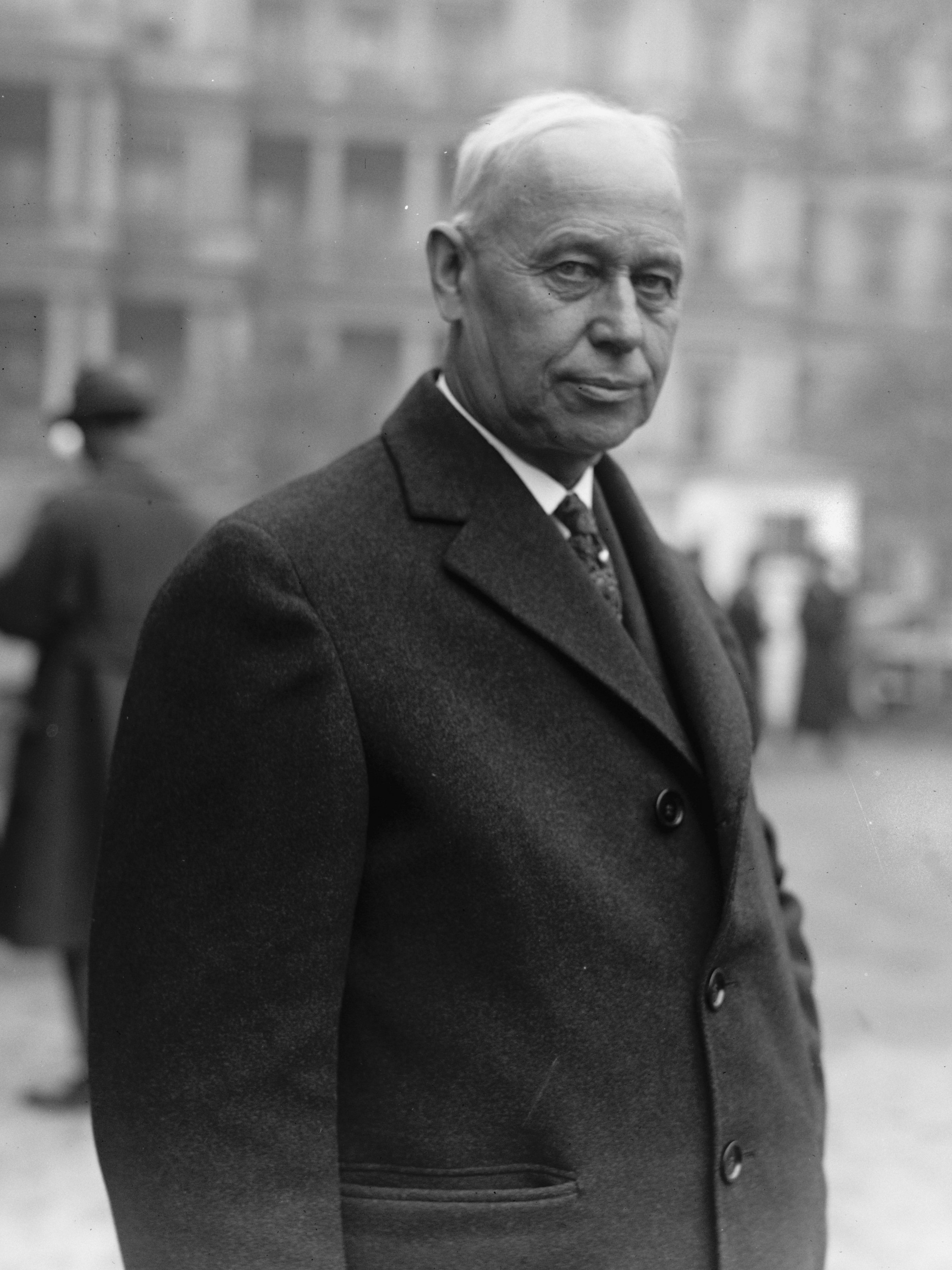

Member of the U.S. House of Representatives from Massachusetts's 3rd district
- In office March 4, 1925 – January 3, 1935
- Preceded by: Calvin Paige
- Succeeded by: Joseph E. Casey

Chairperson of the Massachusetts Republican Party
- In office 1921–1924
- Preceded by: Frank B. Hall
- Succeeded by: Francis Prescott

Mayor of Fitchburg, Massachusetts
- In office 1917–1921
- Preceded by: Marcus Coolidge
- Succeeded by: John B. Fellows

Personal details
- Born: September 20, 1865 Augusta, Maine, US
- Died: February 15, 1947 (aged 81) Fitchburg, Massachusetts, US
- Party: Republican

Frank Herbert Foss (Augusta, Maine, September 20, 1865 – Fitchburg, Massachusetts, February 15, 1947) was a United States representative from Massachusetts.

He attended public schools in Augusta, Maine and graduated from Kent Hill (Maine) Seminary in 1886. He moved to Fitchburg in 1893.

Foss was a member of the Bricklayers, Masons, and Plasterers International Union of America Union, number 19, until 1895 when he took out an honorable withdrawal card and became a general contractor engaged in the construction of industrial plants.

He was a member of the Fitchburg city council (1906–1912); water commissioner (1913–1915); mayor of Fitchburg (1917–1920); member of the Republican State committee (1915–1946), and served as chairman (1921–1924).

He was a delegate to every Republican State Convention held between 1915 and 1946. He was elected as a Republican to the 69th Congress and the following four Congresses (March 4, 1925 – January 3, 1935). He was an unsuccessful candidate for reelection in 1934 to the 74th Congress, and resumed management in the contracting business.

He resided in Fitchburg until his death there on February 15, 1947, aged 81; interment in Forest Hill Cemetery.

Political offices
Preceded by Frank B. Hall	Chairman of the Massachusetts Republican State Committee; 1921–1924	Succeeded by Francis Prescott
U.S. House of Representatives
Preceded by Calvin D. Paige	Member of the U.S. House of Representatives from Massachusetts's 3rd congressional district March 4, 1925 – January 3, 1935	Succeeded by Joseph E. Casey
