= Monte Basbas =

American lawyer and politician

Mayor of Newton, Massachusetts
- In office January 1, 1966 – December 31, 1971
- Preceded by: Donald L. Gibbs
- Succeeded by: Theodore D. Mann

Personal details
- Born: Monte George Basbas; May 6, 1921 Manchester, New Hampshire
- Died: May 25, 2013 (aged 92) Concord, Massachusetts
- Party: Republican
- Spouse: Audrey Vagiates (m. 1948)
- Education: Dartmouth College (BA); Boston University (LLB)

Military service
- Branch/service: United States Army; Army Air Forces; United States Air Force
- Years of service: 1942–1947 (USAAF); 1947–1959 (USAF)
- Rank: Captain
- Battles/wars: World War II; Pacific theater
- Awards: Distinguished Flying Cross; Air Medal (2)

Monte George Basbas (May 6, 1921 – May 25, 2013) was an American lawyer and politician who served as mayor of Newton, Massachusetts from 1966 to 1971.
