= Theodore D. Mann =

American politician

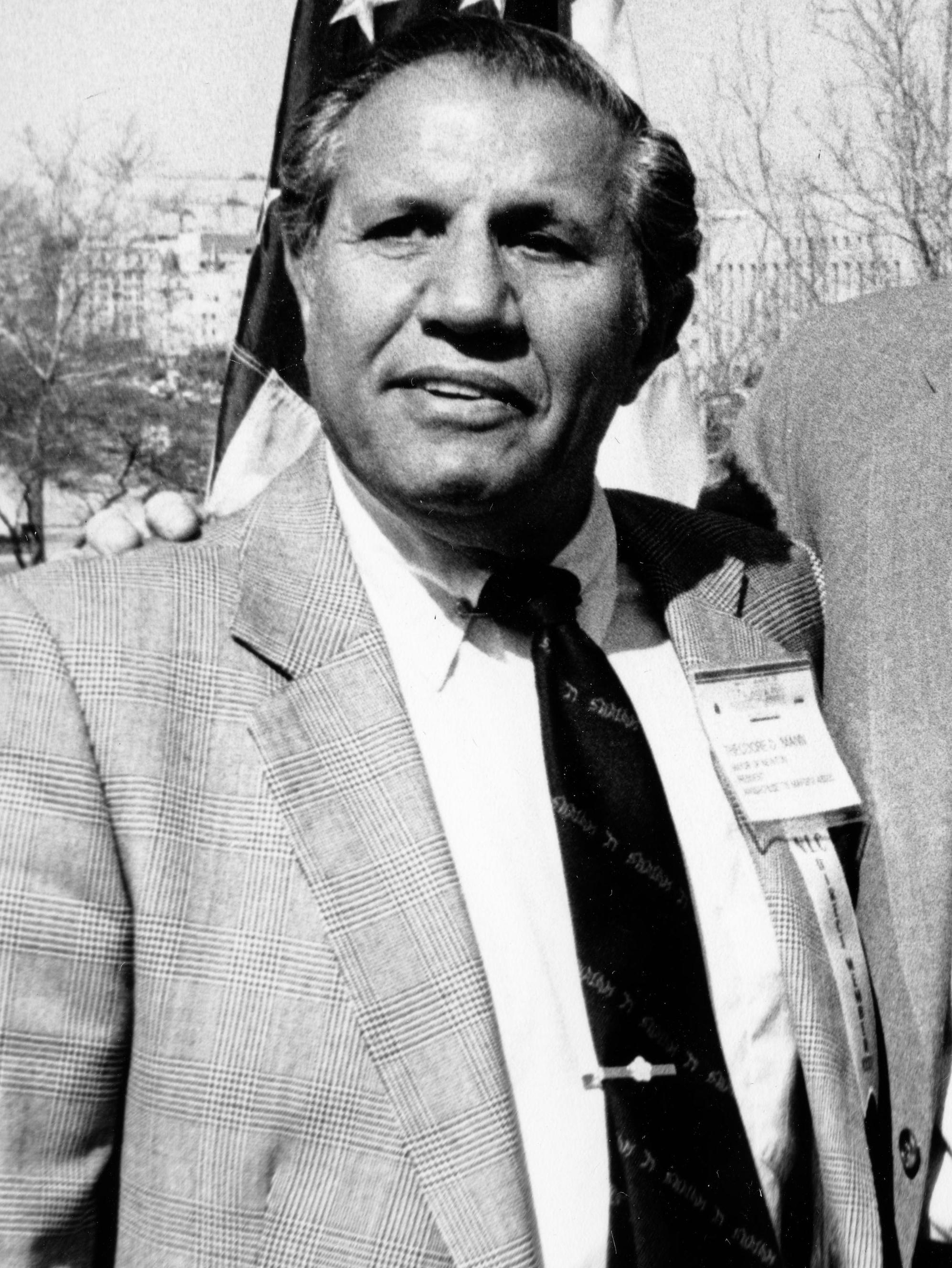
- Mann in 1985

Mayor of Newton, Massachusetts
- In office January 1, 1972 – April 9, 1994
- Preceded by: Monte G. Basbas
- Succeeded by: Thomas Concannon Jr.

Member of the Massachusetts House of Representatives
- In office 1965–1972

Newton, Massachusetts Alderman
- In office 1958–1965

Personal details
- Born: May 13, 1922 Boston, Massachusetts
- Died: April 9, 1994 (aged 71) Newton, Massachusetts
- Party: Republican
- Spouse: Florence (Ober) Mann
- Children: Leslie, Richard, Eric, Debbie and, Stacie (each of whom had two children each)
- Education: Boston College; Boston University
- Occupation: Insurance agent

Theodore D. Mann (May 13, 1922 – April 9, 1994) was an American politician who was the longest-serving mayor of Newton, Massachusetts. He was also the city's first Jewish mayor.

== Biography ==
Mann was born on May 13, 1922 in Boston, Massachusetts. Before being elected Mayor, Mann served four terms as a member of the Newton Board of Aldermen (from 1958–1965), was on the Massachusetts Attorney General's Consumer Advisory Council, and was a member of the Massachusetts House of Representatives from 1965–1972.

During his tenure as Mayor, there were a number of city improvements. While Mann was a Republican, he was able to build coalitions across party lines. The new main Newton Free Library was built and dedicated to him shortly after he died. The recycling program was expanded. Mann was a 'hands on' mayor, and never failed to show up at any Newton event until he was on his deathbed at Newton-Wellesley Hospital.

He was part of the mission to Poland for the purpose of meeting with mayors in Warsaw and Kraków to work with newly elected officials on how to govern in an atmosphere still clouded due to 30 years of Communist rule.

He was the son of Hyman "Honey" Mann and Lillian Epstein Mann. Hyman Mann was a state representative in the 1930s. Mann, affectionately known as "Teddy," had two siblings: Thelma Mann Barkin (1926–1995) and Robert Ralph Mann (1924–). He was married to the former Florence Ober and together they had five children, Leslie, Richard, Eric, Debbie and, Stacie. As of 2011, each of Mann's five children had two children, one of whom has had two children as well, making Teddy a grandfather of 10 and great-grandfather of 2.

Mann died on April 9, 1994 in Newton, Massachusetts.
