= Dürrwangen =

- Municipality
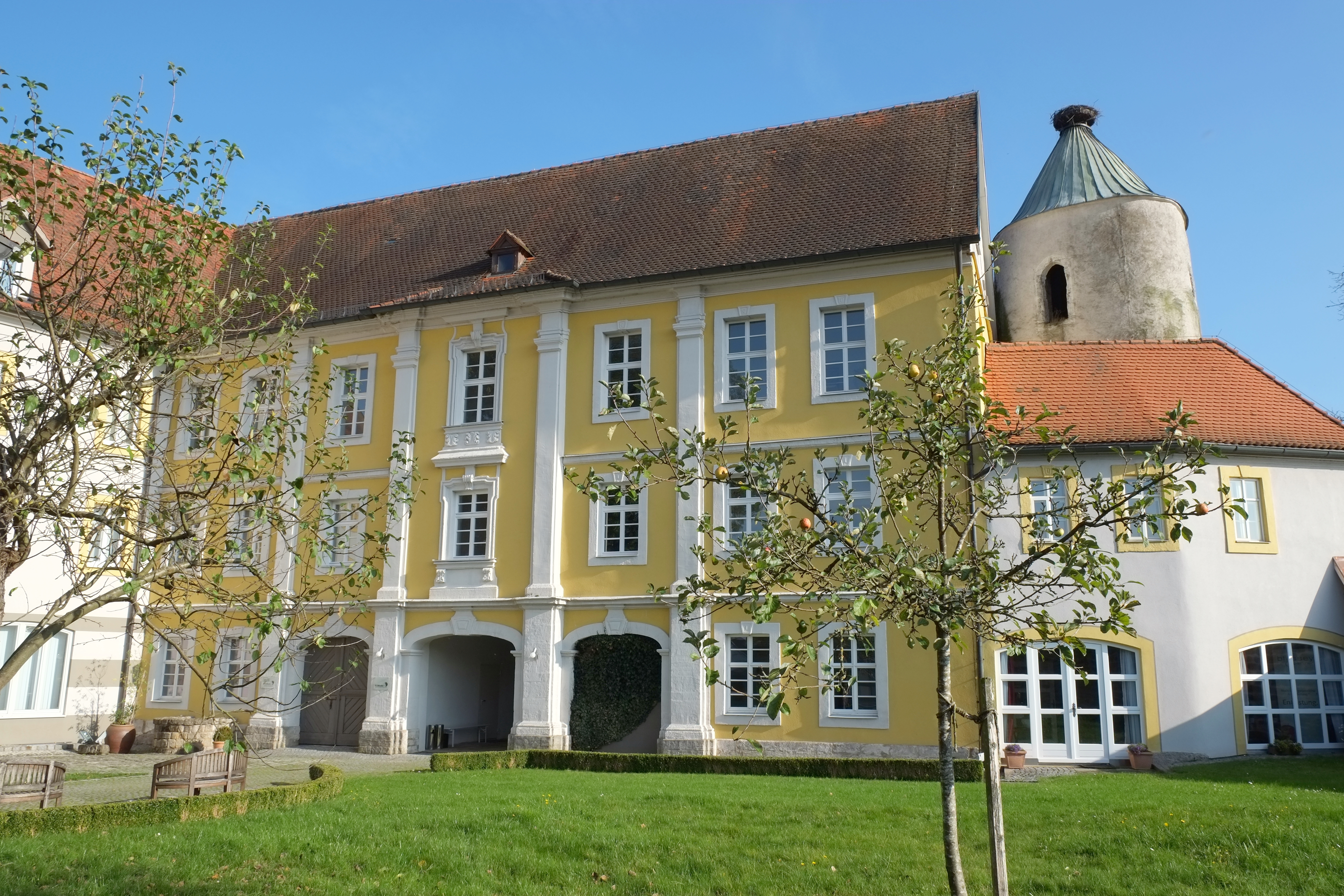
- Dürrwangen Castle

- Coat of arms

- Location of Dürrwangen within Ansbach district
- Interactive map of Dürrwangen
- Location within Germany Location within Bavaria
- Coordinates: 49°7′N 10°22′E
- Country: Germany
- State: Bavaria
- Admin. region: Mittelfranken
- District: Ansbach
- Subdivisions: 16 Ortsteile

Government
  - Mayor (2020–26): Jürgen Konsolke

Area
  - Total: 23.03 km^{2} (8.89 sq mi)
- Elevation: 433–533 m (1,421–1,749 ft)

Population (2025-12-31)
  - Total: 2,500
  - Density: 110/km^{2} (280/sq mi)
- Time zone: UTC+01:00 (CET)
  - Summer (DST): UTC+02:00 (CEST)
- Postal codes: 91602
- Dialling codes: 09856
- Vehicle registration: AN
- Website: www.duerrwangen.de

Dürrwangen (German pronunciation: [ˈdʏʁvaŋən]; East Franconian: Dirrwang) is a municipality in the district of Ansbach in Bavaria in Germany.
