= Old Schwamb Mill =

- U.S. National Register of Historic Places
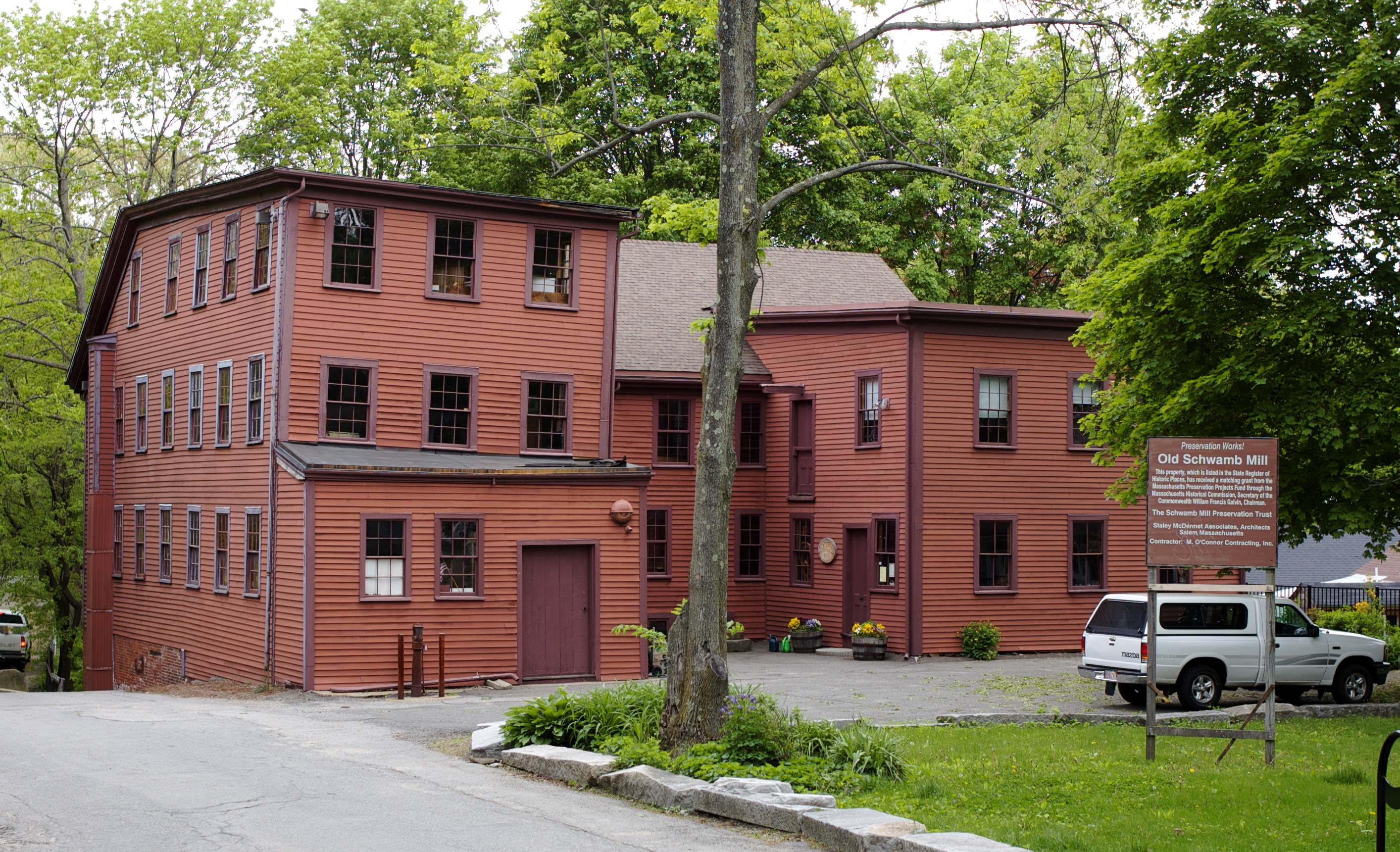
- The Old Schwamb Mill in 2009
- Location: 17 Mill Lane and 29 Lowell St; Arlington, Massachusetts
- Coordinates: 42°25′30.30″N 71°10′40.58″W
- Built: 1861
- NRHP reference No.: 71000081
- Added to NRHP: October 7, 1971

The Old Schwamb Mill is an historic 19th-century mill at 17 Mill Lane in Arlington, Massachusetts. It claims to be located on the oldest continuously used mill site in the United States, with a documented history of operation dating back to about 1684. The current mill building, erected in 1861, is now a living history museum. The property was listed on the National Register of Historic Places in 1971.

== Description and history ==
The Schwamb Mill is set on the south side of Mill Brook, a body of water flowing roughly east–west and bisecting the western half of the town of Arlington. The main mill building is a roughly U-shaped structure, which rises to a height of three stories at the south-facing front, but is sited on land that drops steeply to the stream below. It is finished in clapboard siding, and most of its roofs are flat, with the transverse portion of the U gabled. Across Mill Lane to the north stand a pair of connected buildings, which were historically used as a wood drying house and storage barn.

The Massachusetts Bay Colony was first settled by Europeans in large numbers beginning in 1630, and the area that is now Arlington (then part of Cambridge was recognized as a potential site for grist and lumber mills at an early date. The colony's first mill was established on Mill Brook in 1637, near the site of the Arlington Public Safety Building. It was abandoned in 1645. The present mill site was developed in 1681, beginning with the construction of a dam, and then the erection of a grist mill, which was followed in 1704 by a sawmill. This complex was acquired by Henry Woodbridge in 1860, and adapted for the purpose of grinding spices. After it was severely damaged by fire, it was rebuilt the following year.

The mill was purchased by brothers Charles and Frederick Schwamb in 1864 for the manufacture of circular and elliptical picture frames. It remained within the family's ownership and continued to operate, more or less unchanged in both equipment and processes, until 1969. Two wings were added during this time: one by 1881, and the other between that date and 1898. In 1969 the property was acquired by a non-profit organization formed to preserve the property.

The mill still contains operational equipment and four preserved power systems.

== See also ==
- National Register of Historic Places listings in Arlington, Massachusetts
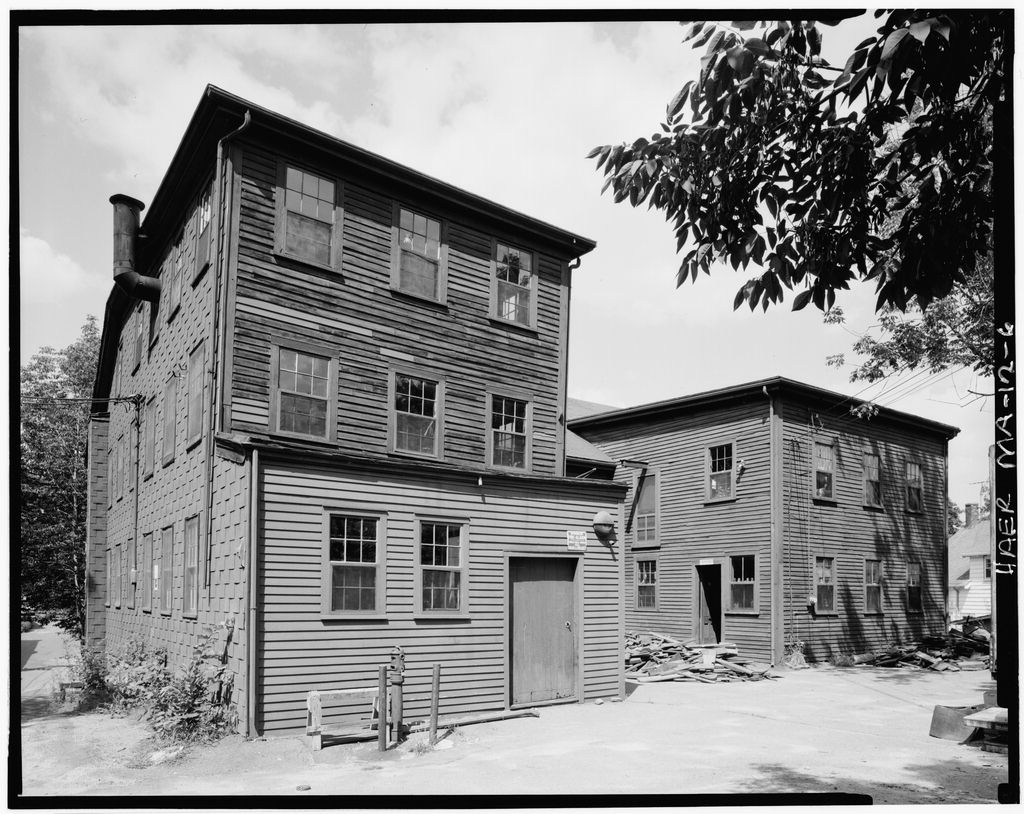
Old Schwamb Mill.

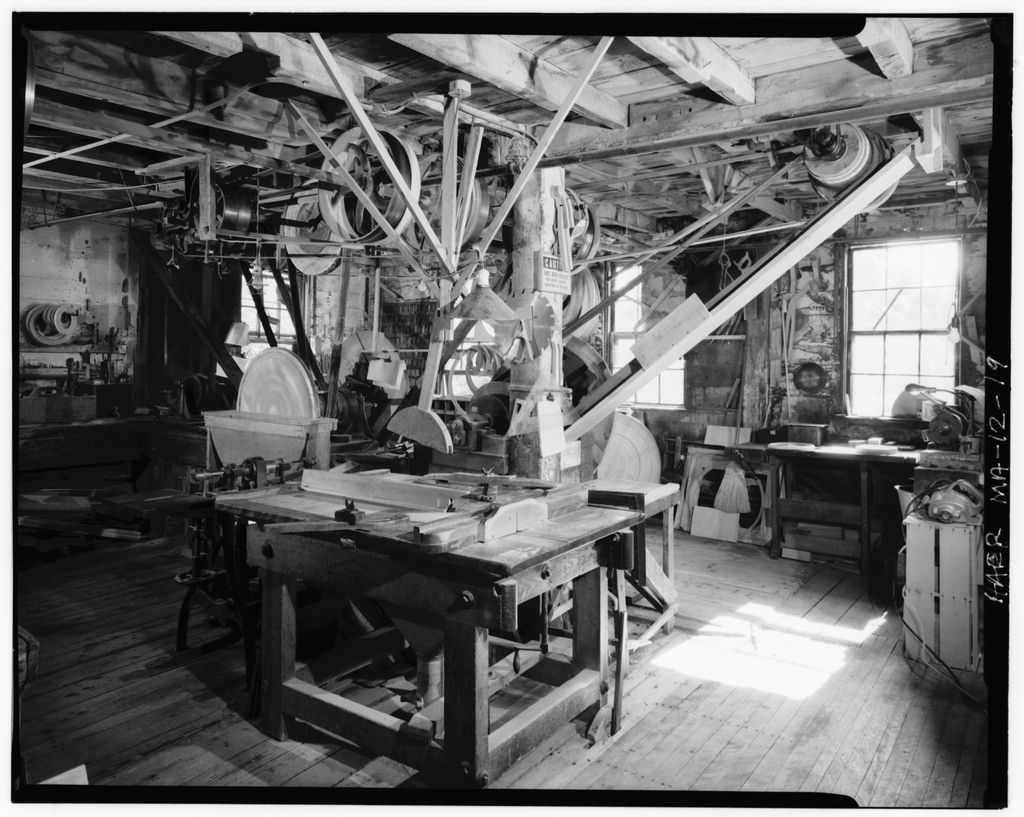
Interior scene.

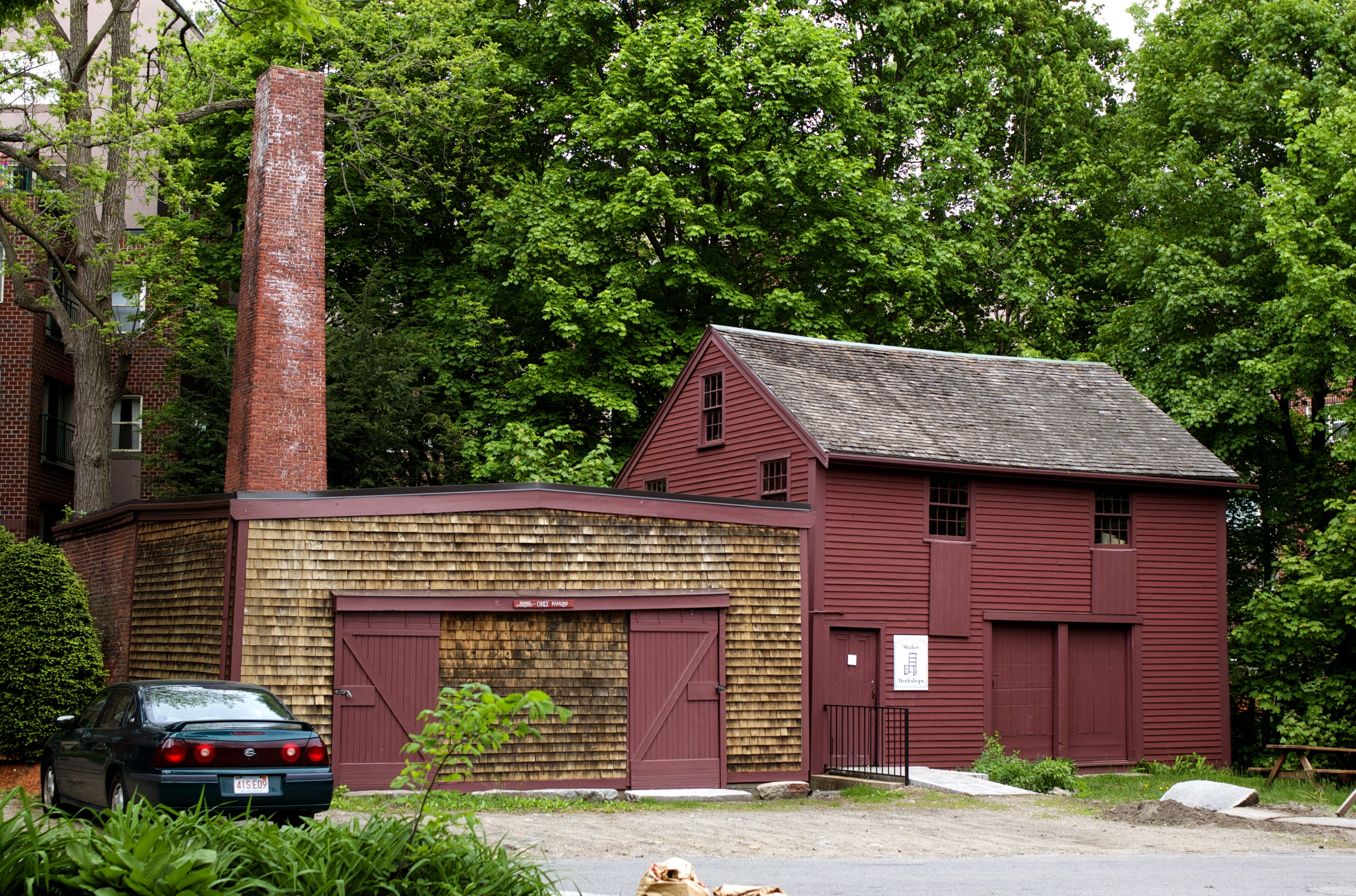
An outbuilding
