= Grafton D. Cushing =

American politician (1864–1939)

Grafton Dulany Cushing
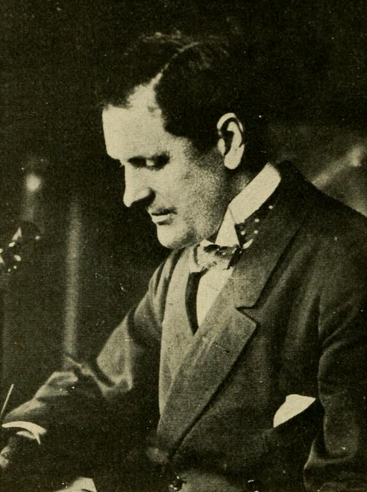
- Cushing c. 1915

45th Lieutenant Governor of Massachusetts
- In office 1915–1916
- Governor: David I. Walsh
- Preceded by: Edward P. Barry
- Succeeded by: Calvin Coolidge

Speaker of the Massachusetts House of Representatives
- In office 1912–1914
- Preceded by: Joseph H. Walker
- Succeeded by: Joseph E. Warner

Member of the Massachusetts House of Representatives
- In office 1906–1914

Personal details
- Born: August 4, 1864 Boston, Massachusetts U.S.
- Died: May 31, 1939 (aged 74) New Bedford, Massachusetts, U.S.
- Party: Republican
- Profession: Lawyer

Grafton Dulany Cushing (August 4, 1864 – May 31, 1939) was an American teacher, lawyer, and politician who served as the 45th lieutenant governor of Massachusetts from 1915 to 1916. A Progressive Republican, his unsuccessful decision to contest the 1915 Republican gubernatorial primary against Samuel W. McCall opened the door for conservative Republican Calvin Coolidge's rise to lieutenant governor, and eventually state governor and president of the United States.

== Biography ==
=== Early life and career ===
Cushing was born on August 4, 1864 to a prominent New England family that had produced several generations of Massachusetts politicians. His father Robert headed the mercantile house Russell & Company. His uncle was New York socialite Thomas Forbes Cushing.

Cushing studied at Noble's Classical School. He then graduated from Harvard College in 1885 and Harvard Law School in 1888. At Harvard, he was a member of the Hasty Pudding Club.

After graduating from law school, Cushing spent a year teaching at Groton School. He left Groton for three years to enter private practice at Shattuck & Munroe, a Boston law firm, and contributed two articles to the Harvard Law Review. He returned to Groton in 1892, teaching in various capacities until 1906. He served on the Boston school board from 1900 to 1906, and was president of the board from 1902 to 1903.

In 1903, Cushing became the president of the Massachusetts Society for the Prevention of Cruelty to Children. According to the Society's website, he changed the Society's philosophy from taking children away from at-risk families to helping those at-risk families provide better conditions for their children. He also chaired the Massachusetts Child Labor Committee.

=== Political career ===
During Cushing's time as a teacher, he served as the president of the Massachusetts Republican Club in 1905 and 1906. Cushing's progressive views caught the attention of Theodore Roosevelt, whose sons attended Cushing's school; Roosevelt was the leader of the progressive faction in the Republican Party. As summarized by Roosevelt, Cushing believed that "our aim must be the supremacy of justice, a more satisfactory distribution of wealth - so far as this is attainable - with a view to a more real equality of opportunity, and in sum a higher social system." Roosevelt encouraged Cushing to expand his political career. Roosevelt's interest in Cushing may have been more than purely political: in Cushing's obituary, the New York Times said that at one point, he had reportedly been engaged to Roosevelt's daughter Alice.

Cushing was elected to the Massachusetts House of Representatives in 1905 and became Speaker of the House in 1912. In 1914, he successfully ran for Lieutenant Governor. At the time, the custom of the Massachusetts Republican Party was that the lieutenant governor ordinarily went on to become governor. However, Cushing served under a Democratic governor, David Walsh, disrupting the usual course of events. (Until 1966, candidates for Massachusetts governor and lieutenant governor were separately elected, which facilitated split-ticket voting.)

Ahead of the 1915 election, Cushing was faced with a choice: running for re-election as lieutenant governor, or competing with Samuel W. McCall for the Republican gubernatorial nomination. Although McCall had never served as lieutenant governor, he was a political veteran, having represented Massachusetts in the U.S. House of Representatives for twenty years. Cushing decided to run for governor, which opened the door for Massachusetts Senate president Calvin Coolidge, also a Republican, to run for lieutenant governor. One of Coolidge's biographers said that if Cushing had deferred to McCall and ran for a second term as lieutenant governor, Coolidge would not have run against him. Cushing's gamble failed: although he outpolled McCall in Boston, McCall narrowly defeated him by just 6,143 votes (48.66% to 44.13%). Coolidge went on to become Lieutenant Governor, Governor, Vice President, and finally President of the United States.

Cushing's political fortunes waned with those of the Republican Party's progressive wing. When Theodore Roosevelt returned to the GOP following the defeat of the Bull Moose Party, Cushing supported his unsuccessful campaign for the 1916 Republican presidential nomination. In 1917, Cushing launched a primary challenge to unseat now-Governor McCall, but lost handily. Following these setbacks, Cushing exited electoral politics.

=== Post-political career ===
After leaving electoral politics, Cushing entered the banking business. During World War I, he headed a "semi-official commission of nine American business men" invited to the United Kingdom to inspect British military facilities. He encouraged the American government to provide additional Liberty Loan support to the British government.

=== Personal life ===
Cushing was a lifelong bachelor, despite his rumored engagement to Alice Roosevelt. During his years at Groton, Cushing cohabited with William Amory Gardner, the school's co-founder. He was one of the founding trustees of the Isabella Stewart Gardner Museum, which was established by Amory Gardner's aunt.

A socialite and a dandy, Cushing was a member of the Knickerbocker Club of New York and the Somerset Club of Boston. The Washington Post described him as a "Back Bay social dictator." When an overdressed Loring Young visited then-Vice President Calvin Coolidge in Washington, D.C., Coolidge joked, "Hello, Loring, seen Grafton Cushing lately?"

In 1911, the New York Times reported on Cushing's attempt to build a stone wall separating his family's Newport beach house from that of Henry Clews. Cushing and his brother were reportedly irritated by the frequent screaming of Clews' toddler grandson.

In 1929, Cushing moved to New York City. He died on May 31, 1939.

== See also ==
- 134th Massachusetts General Court (1913)
- 135th Massachusetts General Court (1914)

Party political offices
Preceded by August H. Goetting	Republican nominee for Lieutenant Governor of Massachusetts; 1914	Succeeded by Calvin Coolidge
Massachusetts House of Representatives
Preceded by Joseph H. Walker	Speaker of the Massachusetts House of Representatives; 1912 — 1914	Succeeded by Channing H. Cox
Political offices
Preceded by Edward P. Barry	Lieutenant Governor of Massachusetts; 1915 – 1916	Succeeded by Calvin Coolidge
