= Sanford Bates =

American politician

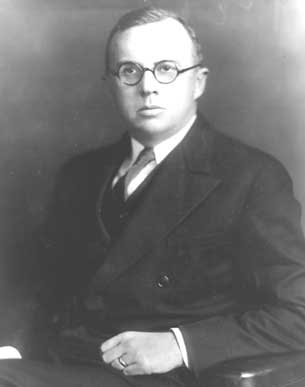
- Sanford Bates, c. 1930s

1st Director of the Federal Bureau of Prisons
- In office 1930–1937
- Preceded by: position established
- Succeeded by: James V. Bennett

Member of the Massachusetts House of Representatives 24th Suffolk District
- In office 1912–1914

Delegate to the 1917 Massachusetts Constitutional Convention
- In office June 6, 1917 – 1919

Personal details
- Born: July 17, 1884 Boston, Massachusetts
- Died: September 8, 1972 (aged 88) Trenton, New Jersey
- Party: Republican
- Education: Boston English High School, Y.M.C.A. Evening Law School
- Profession: Attorney

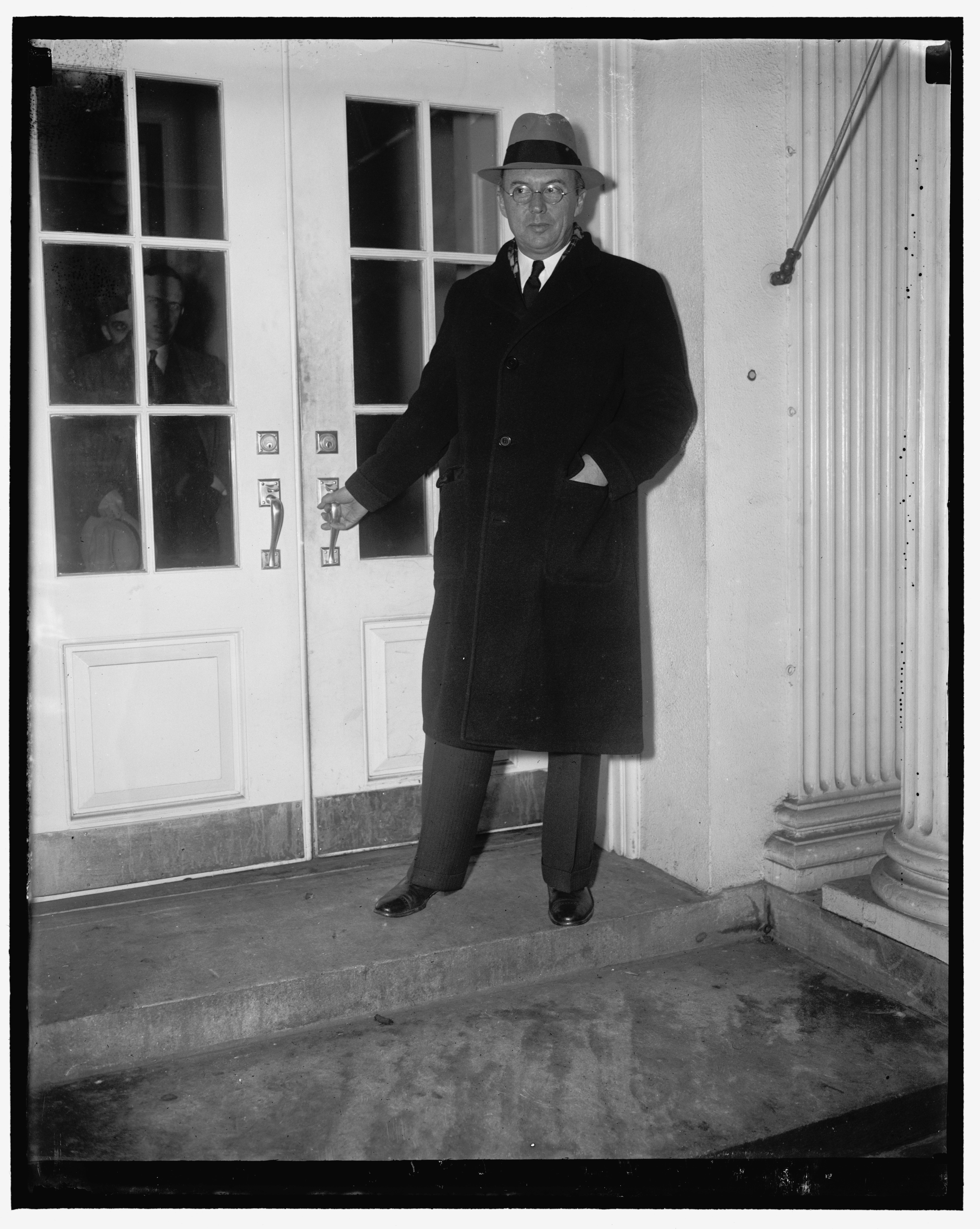
Bates in 1937

Sanford Bates (July 17, 1884 – September 8, 1972) was an American politician and public administrator who served as the first Director of the Federal Bureau of Prisons (1930–1937), a subdivision of the United States Department of Justice.

== Education ==
Bates attended Boston public schools graduating from English High School, and from the Y.M.C.A. Evening Law School, now Northeastern University.

== Early career ==
Before he became an attorney, Bates worked as a clerk in the Boston Street Department.

== Political career ==
Early in his career Bates was active in the local Republican party, he was a member of the Lincoln club, the Republican club of Boston's Ward 24, serving as a member of the Ward 24 Republican Committee in 1910-1911.

== Legislative career ==
Bates served in both houses of the Massachusetts General Court (1912-1917). From 1912 to 1914 Bates represented the 24th Suffolk District in the Massachusetts House of Representatives.

== 1917 Massachusetts Constitutional Convention ==
In 1916, the Massachusetts legislature and electorate approved a calling of a Constitutional Convention. In May 1917, Bates was elected to serve as a member of the Massachusetts Constitutional Convention of 1917, representing the 19th Suffolk District. Bates was a member of the Convention's Committee on Liquor Traffic.

== Corrections career ==
On November 1, 1918 Bates was appointed as the Commissioner of Penal Institutions in Boston (1917-1919), then appointed as Commissioner of the Massachusetts Department of Corrections in 1919 by then-Governor Calvin Coolidge. Bates served there until 1929 when he became the first Superintendent of Prisons for the newly created Federal Bureau of Prisons, U.S. Department of Justice, through January 31, 1937. From 1945 until his semi-retirement in 1954 he headed yet another prison system, the New Jersey Department of Corrections.

Among many other titles, positions and honors, Bates was the president of the American Prison Association in 1926.

== See also ==
- 1915 Massachusetts legislature
- 1916 Massachusetts legislature
