= Winfield F. Prime =

American politician

Winfield Forrest Prime
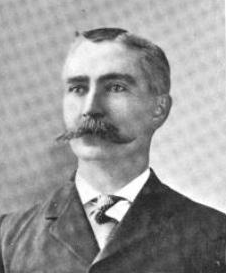

Member of the Massachusetts House of Representatives
- In office 1890–1890
- Constituency: 4th Suffolk district
- In office 1913–1914
- Succeeded by: Jacob Bitzer
- Constituency: 27th Middlesex district

Personal details
- Born: November 22, 1860 Charlestown, Massachusetts
- Died: September 10, 1926 (aged 65) Winchester, Massachusetts
- Party: Republican
- Spouse(s): Mary A. Fontaine, m. May 19, 1891
- Children: Selwyn Forest Prime
- Education: Boston University School of Law
- Profession: Lawyer

Winfield Forrest Prime (November 22, 1860 – September 10, 1926) was an American lawyer and politician who twice served as a member of the Massachusetts House of Representatives.

== Early life ==
Prime was born in Charlestown, Massachusetts to Oliver and Emma F. (Kennard) Prime on November 22, 1860.

== Family life ==
Prime married Mary A. Fontaine on May 19, 1891. They had one child, a son, Selwyn Forrest Prime.

== Massachusetts House of Representatives ==
Prime served as a member of the Massachusetts House of Representatives from two different districts.

=== 1890 legislative session ===
In 1890, Prime represented Ward 4 of the Charlestown district of Boston, Massachusetts, in the Massachusetts House. During the 1890 session Prime served on the committee on Probate and Insolvency.

=== 1913-1914 legislative sessions ===
Prime later was the representative of the twenty seventh Middlesex District serving from 1913 and 1914. Prime served on the committee on Probate and Insolvency in 1913, and as a member of the Judiciary Committee in 1914.

== See also ==
- 1915 Massachusetts legislature

Political offices
Preceded by	Member of the Massachusetts House of Representatives; 27th Middlesex district 1913-1914	Succeeded by Jacob Bitzer
