= Edward P. Barry =

American politician

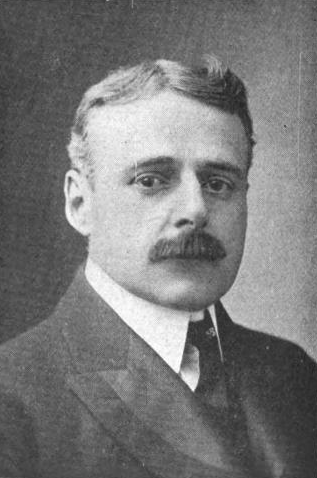
- Barry c. 1914

44th Lieutenant Governor of Massachusetts
- In office 1914–1915
- Governor: David I. Walsh
- Preceded by: David I. Walsh
- Succeeded by: Grafton D. Cushing

Personal details
- Born: November 28, 1864 Boston, Massachusetts
- Died: September 2, 1936 (aged 71) Boston, Massachusetts
- Party: Democratic

Edward P. Barry (November 28, 1864 – September 2, 1936) was an American politician who served as the 44th lieutenant governor of Massachusetts from 1914 to 1915.

Party political offices
Preceded by David I. Walsh	Democratic nominee for Lieutenant Governor of Massachusetts; 1913, 1914, 1915	Succeeded by Thomas P. Riley
Preceded by John E. Swift	Democratic nominee for Attorney General of Massachusetts; 1928	Succeeded by Harold W. Sullivan
Political offices
Preceded by David I. Walsh	Lieutenant Governor of Massachusetts; 1914 – 1915	Succeeded by Grafton D. Cushing
