= William E. Carney =

American politician

William Edward Carney
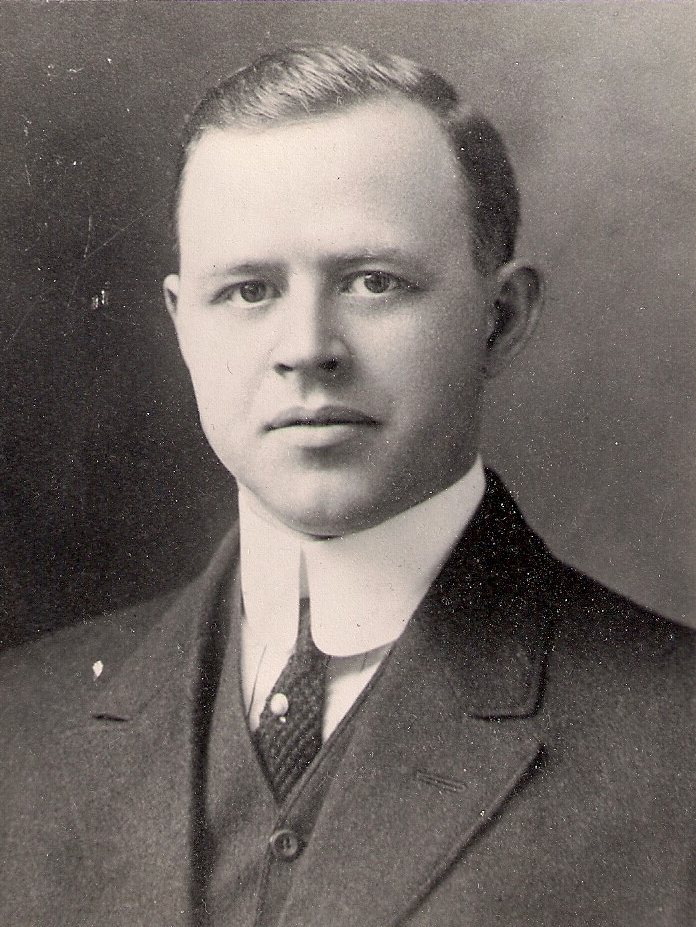
- Carney c. 1914

Member of the Massachusetts House of Representatives from the 4th Suffolk district
- In office 1914–1914

Member of the Boston Common Council from Ward 5
- In office January 4, 1909 – February 3, 1910
- Succeeded by: Office abolished

Personal details
- Born: January 16, 1878 Charlestown, Massachusetts
- Died: January 13, 1948 (aged 69) Charlestown, Massachusetts
- Party: Democratic
- Spouse: Margaret
- Children: Louise G. Carney, b. 1899; Mary Alice Carney, b. 1896
- Occupation: Court probation officer
- Nickname: Billy

William Edward Carney (January 16, 1878 – January 13, 1948) was a Massachusetts politician and court officer who served on the Boston Common Council and as a member of the Massachusetts House of Representatives in the United States of America.

== Massachusetts House of Representatives ==
Carney served on the Massachusetts House of Representatives committee on Public Service in 1913 and 1914.

== Probation officer ==
In 1918, after he left the Massachusetts House of Representatives Carney became a Juvenile Probation Officer of the Charlestown District Court in Boston, Massachusetts. On January 27, 1919 Carney was promoted to Probation Officer from Juvenile Probation Officer.
