= Enos H. Bigelow =

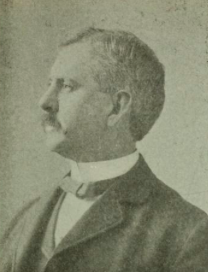

Member of the Massachusetts House of Representatives for the 7th Middlesex District
- In office 1912–1914
- Preceded by: David C. Ahearn
- Succeeded by: James E. MacPherson

Personal details
- Born: May 5, 1855 Framingham, Massachusetts, U.S.
- Died: March 13, 1947 (aged 91) Framingham, Massachusetts, U.S.
- Party: Republican
- Spouse: Agnes Elizabeth Cutter (m. 1887–1936)
- Children: 3
- Education: Worcester Polytechnic Institute; Harvard Medical School
- Occupation: Physician

Enos Hoyt Bigelow (May 5, 1855 – March 13, 1947) was an American medical doctor and politician who was a member of the Massachusetts House of Representatives from 1912 to 1914 and president of the Massachusetts Medical Society from 1924 to 1925.

== Early life ==
Bigelow was born on May 5, 1855, in Framingham, Massachusetts. He attended Framingham Public Schools and graduated from Worcester Polytechnic Institute in 1875.

== Medicine ==
Bigelow attended Harvard Medical School for a year, but withdrew to go into business. He later returned to HMS and graduated in 1882. He began practicing in Framingham that year and was associated with Framingham Hospital for many years. From 1924 to 1925, he was president of the Massachusetts Medical Society.

== Politics ==
Bigelow served on Framingham's board of health and school committee. He was a member of the Massachusetts House of Representatives from 1912 to 1914 and was House chairman of the Public Health Committee during his final term.

== Personal life and death ==
On November 30, 1887, Bigelow married Agnes Elizabeth Cutter. She was the daughter of Leonard R. Cutter and the former Mercy Taylor. They had three children – Leonard Cutter (1888–1940), George Hoyt (1890–1934), and Agnes Mercy (1891–1892). George H. Bigelow was Massachusetts Health Commissioner from 1925 to 1933 and the executive director of Massachusetts General Hospital thereafter. He disappeared on December 3, 1934, which led to a nationwide search. His body was found in Framingham Reservoir No. 3 on March 23, 1935. His death was ruled a suicide. Agnes Bigelow died on October 2, 1936, in Jaffrey, New Hampshire.

Bigelow was a trustee of the Andover Newton Theological School and president of the Boston Seaman's Friend Society, the Framingham Trust Company, and the Framingham Home for the Aged.

Bigelow died on March 13, 1947, in Framingham.
