= James Henry Brennan =

American politician (1888–1949)

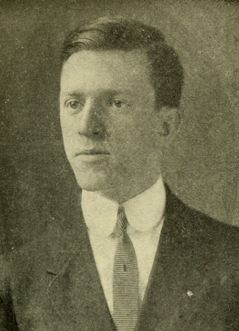

Member of the Massachusetts Governor's Council for the 4th district
- In office 1931–1932
- Preceded by: James F. Powers
- Succeeded by: Daniel H. Coakley

Member of the Massachusetts Senate for the Second Suffolk district
- In office 1913–1914
- Preceded by: James A. Hatton
- Succeeded by: James I. Green

Personal details
- Born: December 21, 1888 Boston, Massachusetts, U.S.
- Died: June 12, 1949 (aged 60) Boston, Massachusetts, U.S.
- Party: Democratic
- Education: Suffolk University Law School

James Henry Brennan (December 21, 1888 – June 12, 1949) was an American politician who was a member of the Massachusetts General Court and the Massachusetts Governor's Council. He was the Democratic Party nominee for Lieutenant Governor of Massachusetts in 1938.

== Early life ==
Brennan was born in Boston's Charlestown neighborhood on December 21, 1888. He was one of eleven children born to Thomas and Margaret Brennan, who were immigrants from County Waterford, Ireland. Brennan began working at the age of 15. He spent five years as a messenger for American Express, then spent a year with the Boston and Maine Railroad. His next job was as a clerk with the Federal Trust Company. During World War I he served in the United States Naval Reserve.

== Career ==
Brennan was a member of the Massachusetts House of Representatives in 1911 and 1912 and the Massachusetts Senate in 1913 and 1914. Taking office at the age of 22, he was the youngest legislator in state history. In 1914, he was an unsuccessful candidate for the Boston City Council.

In 1916, Brennan chaired the Suffolk County Apportionment Committee. He was also a delegate to the Massachusetts Constitutional Convention of 1917–1918. He returned to the House for one term in 1919.

In 1920, Brennan was appointed by Boston mayor Andrew J. Peters to serve as executive secretary to the mayor's Committee for Americanism. His appointment was opposed by the leaders local American Legion posts, who wanted the job to go to a veteran. Although the Legion dropped its opposition, Brennan resigned on January 31, 1920, to relieve the Mayor from any further embarrassment.

In 1921, Brennan graduated from Suffolk Law School. He was admitted to the bar in March 1922. He maintained an office in Boston's Pemberton Square.

In 1924, Brennan was one of nine Democratic candidates for Suffolk County register of probate and insolvency. He finished second to Arthur W. Sullivan by 467 votes.

From 1931 to 1932, Brennan represented the 4th district on the Massachusetts Governor's Council. He was the only Democratic member on the council during his term. In 1932, he was a candidate for the United States House of Representatives seat in Massachusetts's 10th congressional district, but lost in the Democratic primary to incumbent John J. Douglass 20,541 votes to 13,067.

From 1933 to 1934, Brennan served as receiver for the Boston-Continental Bank and the State Bank of Lynn. He resigned to resume his law practice and was succeeded by Frederick Simpson Deitrick.

On April 24, 1938, Brennan announced his candidacy for Lieutenant Governor of Massachusetts. His platform called for unemployment and property tax relief, reform of state welfare institutions, reorganization of the state parole board, closure of the Charlestown State Prison, and suppression of Communism. He won the five candidate Democratic primary, receiving 6,937 more votes than his nearest competitor, Joseph C. White. He lost the general election to Republican Horace T. Cahill 921,786 votes to 773,583.

In 1940, Brennan was a candidate for Massachusetts Attorney General. He was one of three front-runners for the Democratic nomination alongside state senator Thomas M. Burke and former nominee Harold W. Sullivan. He won the nine-candidate primary 66,796 votes to Sullivan's 60,944 and Burke's 55,496. In the general election, he lost to Republican Robert T. Bushnell 961,545 votes to 926,748.

From 1942 to 1944, Brennan was the Office of Price Administration's rent director for eastern Massachusetts.

== Personal life and death ==
In 1922, Brennan married Kantherine A. Mahoney of Jamaica Plain. They had two children. The family moved to a home on the Arborway in 1935. They also had a summer home in Hull, Massachusetts.

Brennan died on June 12, 1949, at his home in Jamaica Plain. He was buried at Holyhood Cemetery in Brookline, Massachusetts.

Party political offices
| Preceded by Francis E. Kelly | Democratic nominee for Lieutenant Governor of Massachusetts; 1938 | Succeeded by Owen A. Gallagher |
| Preceded by Paul A. Dever | Democratic nominee for Attorney General of Massachusetts; 1940 | Succeeded by James E. Agnew |
