= Benjamin F. Haines =

American politician

Benjamin Franklin Haines
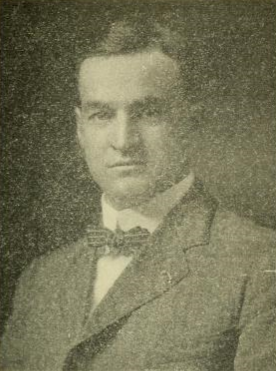
- Benjamin Franklin Haines in 1911

Mayor of Altamonte Springs, Florida

8th Mayor of Medford, Massachusetts
- In office 1915–1922
- Preceded by: Charles S. Taylor
- Succeeded by: Richard B. Coolidge
- Majority: 130

Delegate to the 1917 Massachusetts Constitutional Convention Representing the 26th Middlesex District of the Massachusetts House of Representatives
- In office June 6, 1917 – April 6, 1918

Member of the Massachusetts House of Representatives 28th Middlesex District
- In office 1911–1914

Member of the Medford, Massachusetts Board of Aldermen
- In office 1908–1910

Personal details
- Born: November 25, 1876 Boston, Massachusetts
- Died: 1942 (aged 65–66) Orange County, Florida
- Party: Republican
- Spouse: Carrie Gibbs Bly
- Children: Webber Bly Haines, b. April 3, 1906. Lewis DeMaugh Haines.
- Education: Brown University, Boston University School of Law, 1899
- Occupation: Citrus grower (1935)
- Profession: Attorney, 1902

Benjamin Franklin Haines (1876–1942) was a Massachusetts attorney and politician and a Florida businessman. Haines served as a member of the Medford, Massachusetts, board of aldermen, the Massachusetts House of Representatives, as the eighth mayor of Medford, Massachusetts, and as the mayor of Altamonte Springs, Florida.

== Early life ==
Haines was born November 25, 1876. He was the son of American businessman John DeMaugh Haines. and Kate Luslie (Phillips) was born in Boston, Massachusetts Haines on November 25, 1876.

== Marriage ==
On June 11, 1902 Haines married teacher Carrie Gibbs Bly, the daughter of William L. Bly and Ella F. (Gibbs) Bly in New Bedford, Massachusetts. They had two children, Webber Bly Haines, born April 3, 1906 and Lewis DeMaugh Haines.

== Business career ==
Beginning in 1900, Haines practiced law in Boston.

== Mayor of Medford, Massachusetts ==
In the municipal elections of December 8, 1914, Haines was elected the Mayor of Medford, defeating two term Mayor Charies S. Taylor by 130 votes.

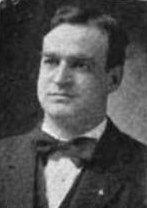
Benjamin F. Haines during the 1917 Massachusetts Constitutional Convention

== 1917 Massachusetts Constitutional Convention ==
In 1916 the Massachusetts legislature and electorate approved a calling of a Constitutional Convention. In May 1917, Haines was elected to serve as a member of the Massachusetts Constitutional Convention of 1917, representing the 26th Middlesex District of the Massachusetts House of Representatives.

== Mayor of Altamonte Springs, Florida ==
In the municipal elections of 1931 Haines was elected the Mayor of Altamonte Springs, Florida.

== Notes ==
Political offices
Preceded by Charles S. Taylor	Mayor of Medford, Massachusetts; 1915–1922	Succeeded by Richard B. Coolidge
