= Henry E. Bothfeld =

American businessman and politician

Henry Edmund Bothfeld
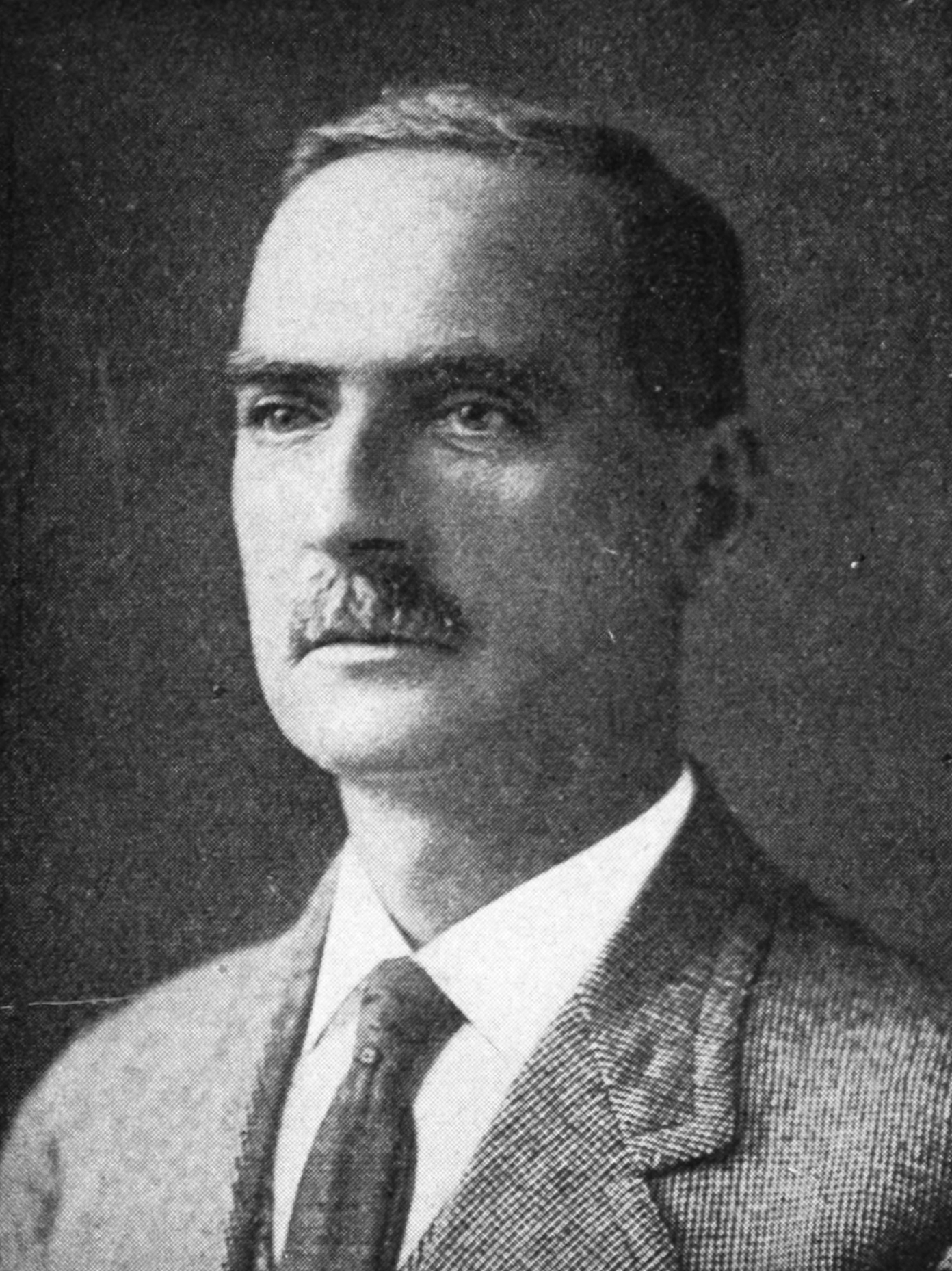
- Bothfeld c. 1911

Member of the Massachusetts House of Representatives from the 4th Middlesex district
- In office 1910–1915
- Succeeded by: Henry Whiting Jarvis

10th Mayor of Newton, Massachusetts
- In office 1895–1895
- Preceded by: John A. Fenno
- Succeeded by: Henry E. Cobb

Personal details
- Born: March 4, 1859 New York, New York
- Died: 4 May 1953 (aged 94)
- Party: Republican
- Spouse(s): Haldee Soule, m. June 18, 1885
- Children: Theodore, Haldee, Helen and Henry Soule
- Profession: Real estate Importer and manufacturer

Henry Edmund Bothfeld (March 4, 1859 – May 4, 1953) was an American businessman, and politician who served as the mayor of Newton, Massachusetts and as a member of the Massachusetts House of Representatives.

== Early life ==
Bothfeld was born to Herman F. and Julia (Ferguson) Bothfeld in New York, New York on March 4, 1859.

== Family life ==
Bothfeld married Haldee Soule in Newton, Massachusetts on June 18, 1885, they had four children Theodore, Haldee, Helen and Henry Soule.

== Public service ==
=== Newton, Massachusetts city government ===
Bothfeld was active in the civic affairs of the city of Newton, Massachusetts, serving on the School Committee, Common Council, as a member of and the President of the Board of Aldermen. In 1895, he served as the mayor of Newton.

=== Massachusetts House of Representatives ===
From 1910 to 1915 Bothfeld served as a member of the Massachusetts House of Representatives from the Fourth Middlesex District.

== See also ==
- 1915 Massachusetts legislature

Political offices
Preceded by John A. Fenno	10th Mayor of Newton, Massachusetts; 1895	Succeeded by Henry E. Cobb
