= Burns Library =

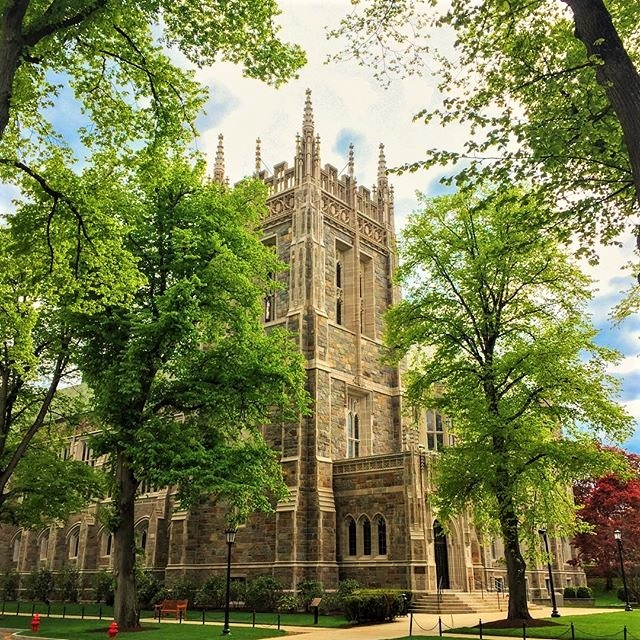
- 42.3367°N 71.1714°W
- Location: 140 Commonwealth Avenue Chestnut Hill, Massachusetts, United States
- Type: Academic
- Established: 1986
- Branch of: Boston College

Collection
- Items collected: Books, manuscripts, scores, music recordings, photographs, maps, journals, oral histories, and pamphlets

Other information
- Website: libguides.bc.edu/burns

The John J. Burns Library, located on the Chestnut Hill Campus of Boston College, is recognized for its extensive Irish collections and rare books, establishing it as a specialized research library. The library's holdings include a broad range of materials related to Irish literature, music, Jesuitica (publications and manuscripts related to Jesuit Catholicism), and the university's own archives. These holdings consist of books, manuscripts, music scores, recordings, photographs, maps, journals, oral histories, and pamphlets connected to Ireland and the Irish-American experience. The library's holdings contain over 300,000 books and 17 million rare manuscripts and artifacts. It is the largest collection of Irish rare books and manuscripts in the Western Hemisphere.

The Burns Librarian is Christian Dupont. Robert Keating O'Neill served as the Burns Librarian for 26 years before his retirement in 2013. O'Neill assembled some of the most significant library and archival collections pertaining to the four Irish authors who have thus far been awarded the Nobel Prize for Literature: William Butler Yeats (1923), George Bernard Shaw (1925), Samuel Beckett (1969), and Seamus Heaney (1995).

== Dedication and funding ==
The library was formally dedicated in 1986, funded by contributions from Brian P. Burns, his family, and other donors. The library's main entrance, the Ford Tower, is named after Margaret Elizabeth Ford, a benefactor who contributed to the library's completion. Since its founding, the library has expanded its resources, notably in Irish studies, Jesuit history, and the history of Boston and New England.

== Architecture and rooms ==
The Burns Library is housed in Bapst Hall, a Gothic Revival building designed by architect Charles Donagh Maginnis, one of the original structures on the Chestnut Hill campus. It was modeled after Merton College Chapel at the University of Oxford. Inside, the library features various rooms dedicated to different collections, such as the Irish Room, which houses works by Samuel Beckett and William Butler Yeats, and includes portraits of Irish and Irish-American figures, as well as historical musical instruments like Egan harps and Joe Derrane’s accordion. Other rooms, such as the O’Brien Fine Print Room and the Francis Thompson Room, named after the poet, display poetry and host changing exhibits.

== Collections ==
The Burns Library holds collections of letters and books from well-known Irish authors and Nobel laureates, such as Samuel Beckett, Seamus Heaney, George Bernard Shaw, and William Butler Yeats. It also includes the primary archival holdings of writers like Gerald Dawe, John F. Deane, Nuala Ní Dhomhnaill, and Flann O’Brien, along with materials from Padraic Colum and Francis Stuart. The library houses the David Goldstein and Martha Moore Avery Papers.

=== The Troubles ===
The library's collections cover historical themes as well, with monographs, government documents, newspapers, and materials tracing Irish and Irish-American politics dating back to the 1700s, including the Canon Rogers Collection, which documents "The Troubles" in Northern Ireland from 1916 through the 1980s.

Other notable holdings include the archives of Northern Ireland photojournalist Bobbie Hanvey, comprising more than 75,000 images not only of the paramilitary conflicts and daily life during the decades of "The Troubles" but also some of the most widely circulated photographs of Heaney and other Irish cultural icons.

Additionally, the library was involved in the "Belfast Project," an oral history initiative featuring recordings from more than 40 former republican and loyalist paramilitaries discussing their experiences during the Troubles in Northern Ireland from the late 1960s to the late 1990s. This project has attracted attention due to legal disputes over its content.

== Events ==
In 2022, the library hosted “REDRESS: Ireland’s Institutions and Transitional Justice.”
