= Boston police strike =

1919 labor unrest in Massachusetts, US

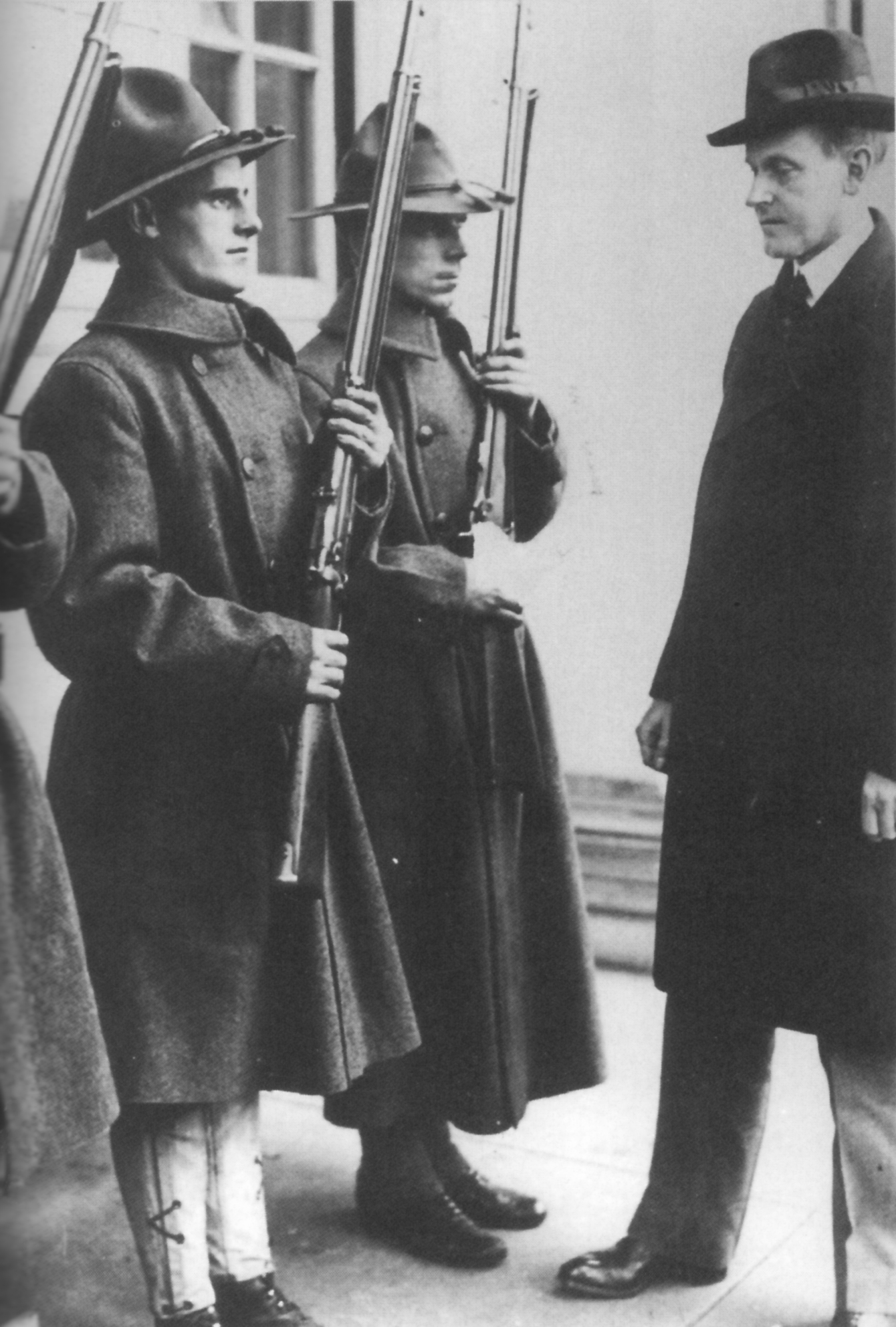
Governor of Massachusetts Calvin Coolidge inspects the militia during the Boston police strike of 1919

The Boston police strike occurred on September 9, 1919, when Boston police officers went on strike seeking recognition for their trade union and improvements in wages and working conditions. Police Commissioner Edwin Upton Curtis denied that police officers had any right to form a union, much less one affiliated with a larger organization like the American Federation of Labor (AFL), which some attribute to concerns that unionized police would not protect the interest of city officials and business leaders. Attempts at reconciliation between the Commissioner and the police officers, particularly on the part of Boston's mayor, Andrew James Peters, failed.

During the strike, Boston experienced several nights of lawlessness. Several thousand members of the Massachusetts State Guard, supported by volunteers, restored order by force. Press reaction both locally and nationally described the strike as Bolshevik-inspired and directed at the destruction of civil society. The strikers were called "deserters" and "agents of Lenin". Samuel Gompers of the AFL recognized that the strike was damaging the cause of labor in the public mind and advised the strikers to return to work. Commissioner Curtis refused to re-hire the striking policemen. He was supported by Massachusetts governor Calvin Coolidge, whose rebuke of Gompers earned him a national reputation.

Nine civilians were killed in several days of civil unrest and the threat of a general strike. Eight of the nine were fatally shot by members of the State Guard. The police strike ended on September 13, when Commissioner Curtis announced the replacement of all striking workers with 1,500 new officers, given higher wages. The strike proved a setback for labor unions. The AFL discontinued its attempts to organize police officers for another two decades. Coolidge went on to win election as the Republican nominee for Vice President of the United States in the 1920 presidential election and became president in 1923 upon President Warren Harding's death.

== Background ==
In 1895, the Massachusetts legislature transferred control of the Boston police department from Boston's mayor to the governor of Massachusetts, whom it authorized to appoint a five-person board of commissioners to manage the department. In 1906, the legislature abolished that board and gave the governor the authority to name a single commissioner to a term of five years, subject to removal by the governor. The mayor and the city continued to have responsibility for the department's expenses and the physical working conditions of its employees, but the commissioner controlled department operations and the hiring, training, and discipline of the police officers.

In 1918, the salary for patrolmen was set at $1,400 a year ($30,000 in 2025). Police officers had to buy their own uniforms and equipment which cost over $200. New recruits received $730 during their first year, which increased annually to $821.25 and $1000, and to $1,400 after six years. In the years following World War I, inflation dramatically eroded the value of a police officer's salary. From 1913 to May 1919, the cost of living rose by 76%, while police wages rose just 18%. Discontent and restiveness among the Boston police force grew as they compared their wages and found they were earning less than an unskilled steelworker, half as much as a carpenter or mechanic and 50 cents a day less than a streetcar conductor. Boston city laborers were earning a third more on an hourly basis.

Police officers had an extensive list of grievances. They worked ten-hour shifts and typically recorded weekly totals between 75 and 90 hours. (Note: Patrolmen worked a seven-day week, with one day off every 15 days. Patrolmen who worked the day shift put in 73 hours a week and "night men" worked 83 hours a week, while "wagon men" worked 98 hours. After a day off, the men were required to serve a "house day" which meant they were on call at the station from 8:00 a.m. until 6:00 p.m. performing various tasks such as recording duty, wagon runs and attending to the "signal desk". After a three-hour break, they reported back to the station house at 9:00 p.m. where they slept for three hours until midnight at which time the bell rang for roll call and they "went out on the street" until 8:00 a.m. After that, they could go home, but had to be back at 6:00 p.m. for what they called an "evening on the floor" which meant performing the same type of duties such as taking care of prisoners, wagon trips or "whatever turned up." At 9:00 p.m. the patrolmen went back to bed for three hours. The "day men", in addition to their 10-hour day, were required to spend one night a week in the station house on reserve. Although the commissioner and mayor had agreed to give the police a 24-hour holiday for every eight days of work, this could be taken away "at will" and often was. Additionally, even during his free time, a patrolman could not leave the city limits without express permission. According to one patrolman; "That was the way it was day after day, round after round. We had no freedom, no home life at all. We couldn't even go to Revere Beach without the captain's permission.") They were not paid for time spent on court appearances. They also objected to being required to perform such tasks as "delivering unpaid tax bills, surveying rooming houses, taking the census, or watching the polls at election" and checking the backgrounds of prospective jurors as well as serving as "errand boys" for their officers. They complained about having to share beds and the lack of sanitation, baths, and toilets at many of the 19 station houses where they were required to live, most of which dated to before the Civil War. The Court Street station had four toilets for 135 men, and one bathtub.

Boston's police officers, acting with the sponsorship of the police department, had formed an association known as the Boston Social Club in 1906. In 1917, a committee of police officers representing the Social Club met with Commissioner Stephen O'Meara to ask about a raise. He was sympathetic, but advised them to wait for a better time. They pressed the issue in the summer of 1918 and, near the end of the year, Mayor Andrew Peters offered salary increases that would affect about one-fourth of the officers. O'Meara died in December 1918, and Governor Samuel McCall appointed Edwin Upton Curtis, former mayor of Boston, as commissioner of the Boston Police Department.

After another meeting where representatives of the Social Club repeated their salary demands, Peters said: "while the word 'strike' was not mentioned, the whole situation is far more serious than I realized." He also made it clear to the rank and file that they were not entitled to form their own union. Curtis did not share his predecessor's or the mayor's sympathy for the police, but in February 1918 he offered a wage compromise that the police rejected. In May, Governor Coolidge announced raises, which were also rejected. When the Social Club's representatives tried to raise grievances with him, Curtis set up his own grievance committee to handle management-employee disputes, based on the election of representatives from each precinct house by secret ballot, and it met just once.

A few months later, in June 1919, the American Federation of Labor (AFL), responding to repeated requests from local police organizations, began accepting police organizations into their membership. By September, it had granted charters to police unions in 37 cities, including Washington, D.C., Los Angeles, Miami, and St. Paul, though not without protests from some city officials, who opposed the unionization of police, firefighters, and teachers.

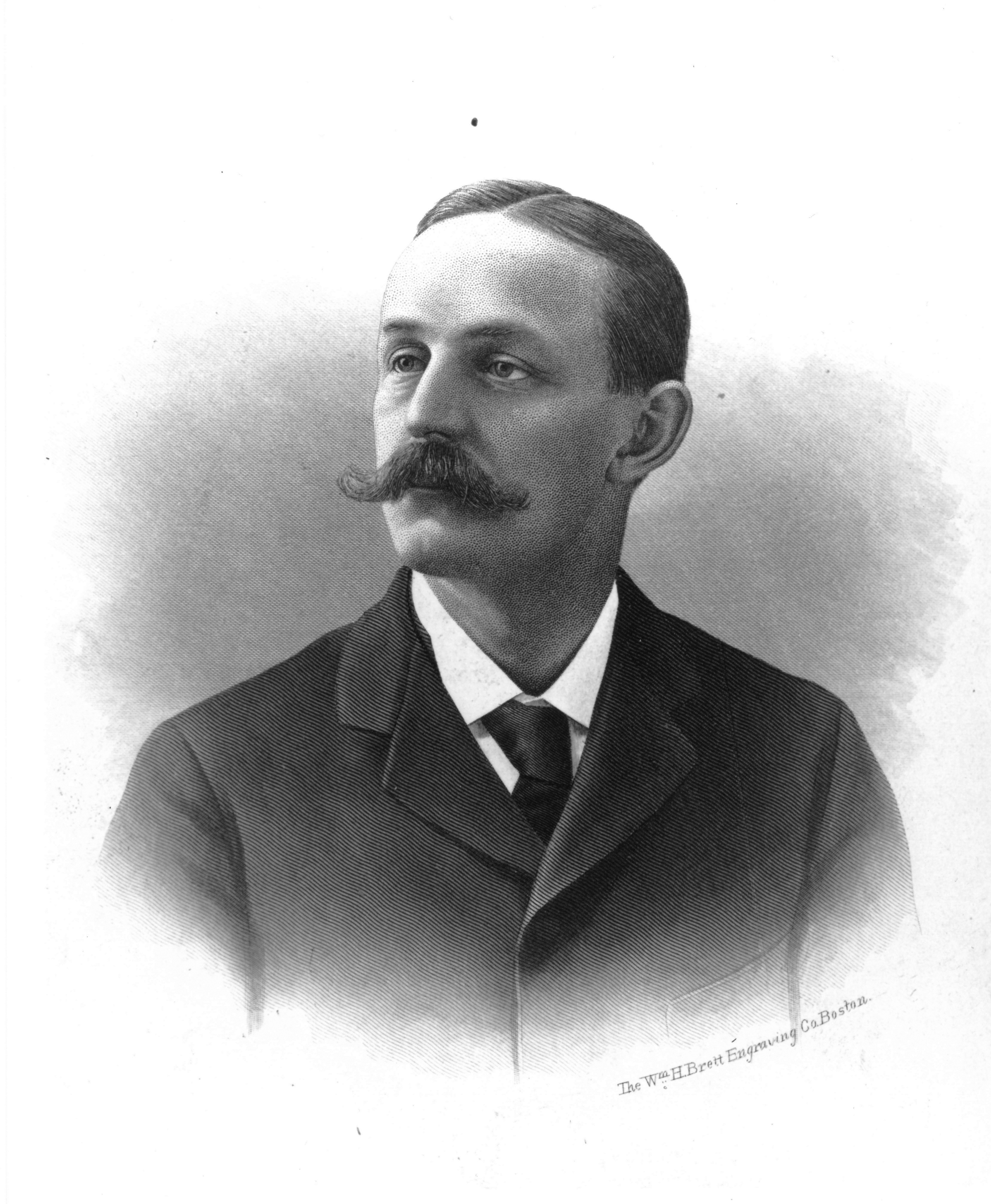
Edwin U. Curtis Boston Police Commissioner

The Boston police organized under an AFL charter in order to gain support from other unions in their negotiations and any strike that might ensue. On August 9, 1919, the Boston Social Club requested a charter from the AFL. On August 11, Curtis issued a General Order forbidding police officers to join any "organization, club or body outside the department", making an exception only for patriotic organizations such as the newly-formed American Legion. His administration argued that such a rule was based on the conflict of interest between police officers' duties and union membership:

It is or should be apparent to any thinking person that the police department of this or any other city cannot fulfill its duty to the entire public if its members are subject to the direction of an organization existing outside the department.... If troubles and disturbances arise where the interests of this organization and the interests of other elements and classes in the community conflict, the situation immediately arises which always arises when a man attempts to serve two masters, – he must fail either in his duty as a policeman, or in his obligation to the organization that controls him.

Some attribute the concern from Commissioner Curtis, which was shared by the chamber of commerce, to the fear that unionized police would align with workers and not continue to protect the interest of capitalists. On August 15, the police received their AFL charter. On August 17, the Central Labor Union of Boston welcomed the police union and denounced Curtis for his assertions that the police had no right to unionize. Curtis refused to meet with the eight members of the police union's committee. He suspended them and 11 others who held various union offices and scheduled trials to determine if they had violated his General Order. At this point, Curtis was a hero to business interests. Late in August, the New Hampshire Association of Manufacturers called him "the Ole Hanson of the east", equating the events they anticipated in Boston with the earlier Seattle General Strike.

Mayor Peters sought to play an intermediary role by appointing a Citizen's Committee to review the dispute about union representation. He chose a well-known local reformer as its chair, James J. Storrow, whose group recommended that Curtis and the police agree to a police union without AFL ties and without the right to strike. Curtis would recognize the police union, which would agree to remain "independent and unaffiliated" and no action would be taken against the 19 men Curtis had suspended. Four of Boston's five newspapers backed the compromise, with only the Boston Transcript holding to a consistent anti-union position. The Boston Chamber of Commerce backed it as well.

Curtis, with the backing of Massachusetts Governor Calvin Coolidge, rejected the Storrow Commission's proposal. He proceeded with department trials of the 19 and on September 8 found them guilty of union activity. Rather than dismiss them from the police force, he extended their suspensions. He later explained that he was giving them an opportunity to reconsider their actions and avoid discharges, which would have been irrevocable. The police union members responded that same day by voting 1134 to 2 in favor of a strike and scheduled it to start at evening roll call the next day. Their stated grounds omitted wages and working conditions. They said the strike's rationale was to protest the Commissioner's denial of their right to ally themselves with the AFL.

In anticipation of the strike, all of Boston's newspapers called it "Bolshevistic", pleaded with the police to reconsider and predicted dire consequences. One also warned the police that their eventual defeat was guaranteed, that they would lose because "behind Boston in this skirmish with Bolshevism stands Massachusetts, and behind Massachusetts stands America."

== Strike ==
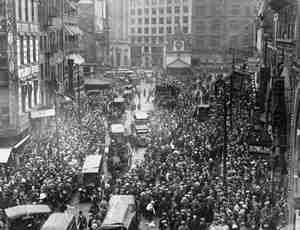
Newly arrived Massachusetts Militia try to keep order in Scollay Square

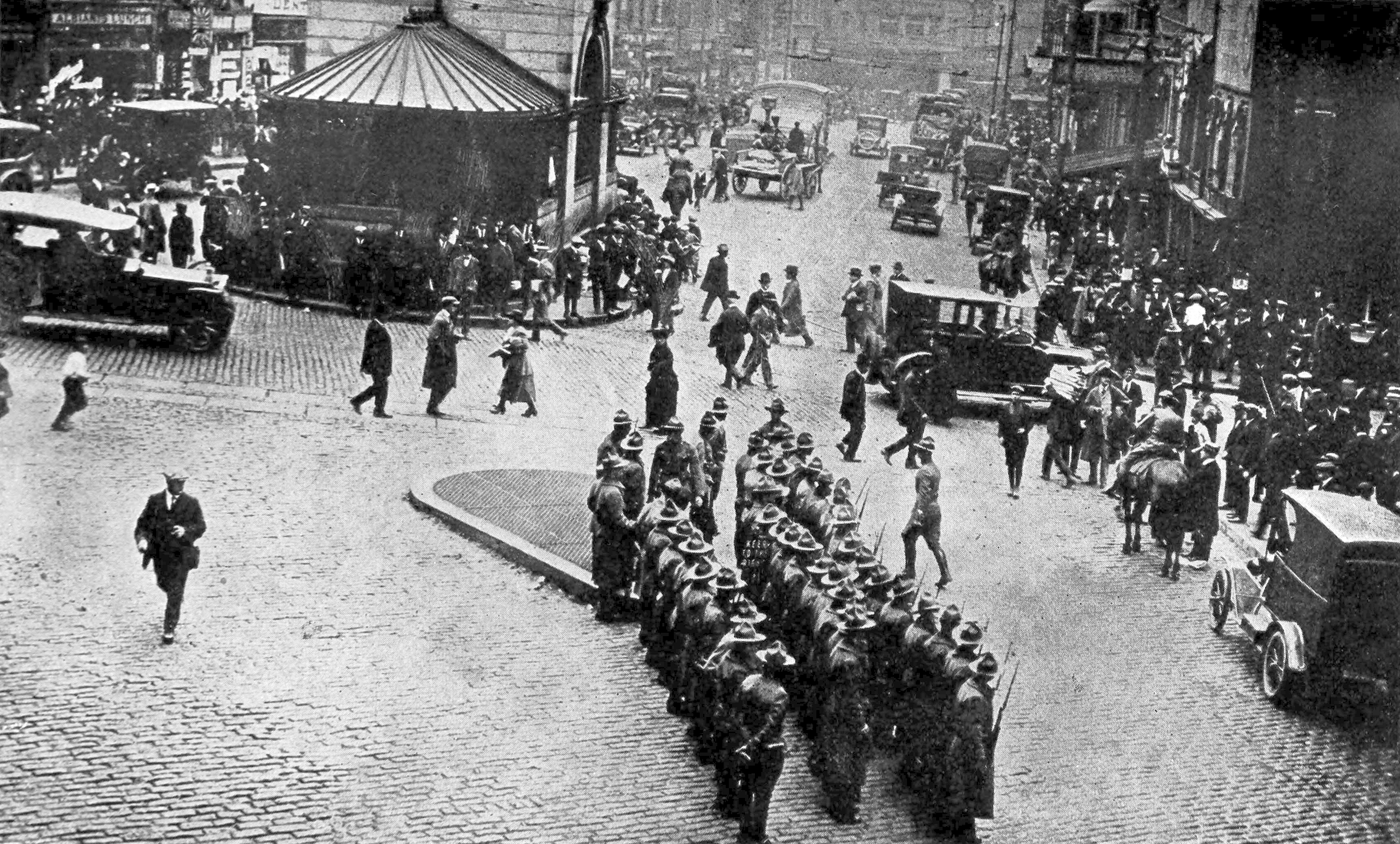
A company of Massachusetts Militia await assignment to police duty during the strike

On September 9, Boston Police Department officers went on strike at 5:45 p.m. Of the force's 1,544 officers and men, 1,117 (72%) failed to report for work. Coolidge assigned 100 members of the state's Metropolitan Park Police Department to replace the striking officers, but 58 of them refused to participate and were suspended from their jobs. Despite assurances from Commissioner Curtis to Mayor Peters and Governor Coolidge, Boston had little police protection for the night of September 9. Volunteer replacements were still being organized and due to report the next morning. Many of the strikebreakers were students at Harvard University.

Over the night of September 9–10, the city witnessed an outbreak of hooliganism and looting. Some was rowdy behavior that scared respectable citizens, such as youths throwing rocks at streetcars and overturning the carts of street vendors. More overtly criminal activity included the smashing of store windows and looting their displays or setting off false fire alarms. Such activity was restricted to certain parts of the city and, according to the New York Times, "throughout the greater part of the city the usual peace and quiet prevailed."

In the morning the mayor asked the governor to furnish a force of State Guards; Coolidge promptly agreed and eventually provided almost 5,000 men under the command of Brig. Gen. Samuel D. Parker. Commissioner Curtis later praised the State Guards' performance in his Annual Report: "The whole community is now aware of the effectiveness with which the Massachusetts State Guard worked when it came into the city. I cannot add anything to the universal chorus of commendation that has greeted their work." The morning papers following the first night's violence were full of loud complaints and derogatory terms for the police: "deserters", "agents of Lenin".

Violence peaked the next evening, the night of September 10–11. Businesses were better prepared. Some had boarded up and others stayed open all night with armed guards visible to discourage thieves taking advantage of the strike. Gamblers played dice in open view, and women had their handbags snatched. But the Guard's inexperience at handling crowds resulted in dangerous attempts to assert control. Gunfire in South Boston left two dead and others wounded. One person died in a riot at Scollay Square, a center of amusement halls and theaters. Whether the crowds were threatening property or making trouble because they were in sympathy with the strikers is unknown.

The death total ultimately reached nine. In the "cavalry charge" of State Guard troops in Scollay Square on the 10th, Robert Lallie was shot and killed; Miss Margaret Walsh was wounded and died the next day. Henry Groat (or Grote), age 20, was killed near the Armory near Jamaica Plain for refusing to abandon a game of craps. On the 11th a striking policeman, a nine-year veteran named Richard D. Reemts, disarmed two strikebreaking policemen at Columbus Avenue and Buckingham Street. Reemts then was fatally shot by an auto parts dealer. Passerby Arthur E. (or E.B.) McGill was shot to death in Howard Street. Three other men, Raymond L. Barnen (reported elsewhere as Bayers or Barros), Robert Sheehan, and Anthony Carr, were also killed on the 11th. The final fatal casualty may have been 25-year-old Gustave Geist on the 13th. All but Reemts were shot by members of the state militia.

City life continued relatively normally, especially during daytime hours. Schools remained open. Later claims against the city for losses incurred during the two nights of disorder ran to $35,000, of which the city paid $34,000. Those figures represent a non-partisan calculation of the costs of the strike to the Boston business community.

When Governor Coolidge called the strikers "deserters", a mass meeting of the Boston Police Union responded:

When we were honorably discharged from the United States army, we were hailed as heroes and saviors of our country. We returned to our duties on the police force of Boston.

Now, though only a few months have passed, we are denounced as deserters, as traitors to our city and violators of our oath of office.

The first men to raise the cry were those who have always been opposed to giving to labor a living wage. It was taken up by the newspapers, who cared little for the real facts. You finally added your word of condemnation....

Among us are men who have gone against spitting machine guns single-handed, and captured them, volunteering for the job. Among us are men who have ridden with dispatches through shell fire so dense that four men fell and only the fifth got through.

Not one man of us ever disgraced the flag or his service. It is bitter to come home and be called deserters and traitors. We are the same men who were on the French front.

Some of us fought in the Spanish war of 1898. Won't you tell the people of Massachusetts in which war you served?

On the evening of September 11, the Central Labor Union met to consider calling a general strike in support of the striking police. Earlier it had expressed enthusiasm for a general strike, more likely as an expression of solidarity than a declaration of serious intent. It collected the votes of its constituent unions and on September 12 announced it was delaying a decision. Their statement explained their reasoning: "We are not to act in a manner that will give the prejudiced press and autocratic employers a chance to criticize us."

On September 11, Matthew Woll, an AFL vice-president, said his organization discouraged strikes by government employees but defended their right to organize: "all wage earners have the right to associate with one another and collectively to improve their condition". He blamed the strike on government managers who failed to recognize that right and put the Boston situation in the context of the broader union movement: "On the question of industrial democracy [i.e., unionization], we find still that group of employers, Bourbonic in character, who believe democracy means for them to ruin or rule industrially. They cannot conceive that the workers have any right in the management of industry. ... The time has passed when any man can say he is the ruler of the people in his employment."

AFL President Samuel Gompers, just returned from Europe, quickly assessed the situation and the strength of public sentiment. On September 12, he urged the strikers to return to work, asking the city to agree to suspend judgment on whether to recognize the police union. In a telegram to Mayor Peters he cited the model of Washington, D.C., which had, at the suggestion of President Wilson, suspended its regulation forbidding police officers to join a union affiliated with the AFL until a conference scheduled for October 6. The police accepted Gompers' recommendation immediately. Coolidge replied with a statement of support for Curtis' hard line. Gompers telegraphed Coolidge again, this time blaming Curtis for the crisis. Coolidge dismissed the Commissioner's behavior as irrelevant, because no provocation could justify the police walkout. His terse summation created his reputation on the national scene: "There is no right to strike against the public safety, anywhere, anytime." Coolidge said he would continue to "defend the sovereignty of Massachusetts".

By the weekend, the presence of the State Guards had become a curiosity. Larger than usual crowds strolled in the center of the city. Thousands attended a band concert on the Boston Common. "The shootings of the last few days for interference with guardsmen", said the New York Times, "seem to have had a marked effect".

Coolidge said he originally hoped to reinstate the officers, stating in a telegram to a labor convention, "I earnestly hope that circumstances may arise which will cause the police officers to be reinstated". Over the objections of Mayor Peters, Commissioner Curtis announced on September 13 that he planned to recruit a new force. He fired roughly 1,100 and hired 1,574 replacement police officers from a pool of unemployed World War I veterans. Members of the United Garment Workers refused to sew uniforms for the new hires, who had to report for work in civilian clothing.

The new officers hired in the wake of the strike received higher salaries and more vacation days than the strikers had. They enjoyed a starting salary of $1,400 along with a pension plan, and the department covered the cost of their uniforms and equipment. The population of Boston raised $472,000 to help pay for the State Guards until new police officers could be recruited.

The State Guard was relieved from duty on December 21, 1919, after the Boston Police Department had recruited enough new members to begin policing the city again.

== Reaction ==
"Bolshevism in the United States is no longer a specter. Boston in chaos reveals its sinister substance."

— Philadelphia Public Ledger

In an editorial on the first morning of the strike, The New York Times supported the police commissioner and said that the strikers were "[i]nspired unconsciously by anti-social ideals, or acting by 'suggestion' of their London and Liverpool brethren", which had recently seen similar strikes. It said:

A policeman has no more right to belong to a union than a soldier or a sailor. He must be ready to obey orders, the orders of his superiors, not those of any outside body. One of his duties is the maintenance of order in the case of strike violence. In such a case, if he is faithful to his union, he may have to be unfaithful to the public, which pays him to protect it. The situation is false and impossible.... It is the privilege of Boston policemen to resign if they are not satisfied with the conditions of their employment.... but it is intolerable that a city ... should be deserted by men who misunderstand their position and function as policemen, and who take their orders from outside.... [I]t is an imported, revolutionary idea that may spread to various cities. There should be plain and stern law against it. It is practically an analogue of military desertion... [I]t ought to be punished suitably and repressed.

It later called the strike "this Boston essay in Bolshevism" and lamented the attempt of Mayor Peters and the Storrow Commission "to submit to compromise an issue that could not be compromised". Newspaper accounts exaggerated the level of crime and violence that accompanied the strike, resulting in a national furor that shaped the political response. A Philadelphia paper viewed the Boston violence in the same light as other labor unrest and numerous race riots in 1919: "Bolshevism in the United States is no longer a specter. Boston in chaos reveals its sinister substance."

President Woodrow Wilson, speaking from Montana, branded the walkout "a crime against civilization" that left the city "at the mercy of an army of thugs." He said that "the obligation of a policeman is as sacred and direct as the obligation of a soldier. He is a public servant, not a private employee, and the whole honor of the community is in his hands. He has no right to prefer any private advantage to the public safety." Elihu Root, a former Secretary of War and winner of the Nobel Peace Prize, told a Carnegie Hall audience on September 17 that the strike was an attack on constitutional government because it represented "the passing of power to enforce laws, the power to punish crime, the power to maintain order from the whole people of the United States" to the 3% of the population represented by the AFL.

A report from Washington was headlined: "Senators Think Effort to Sovietize the Government Is Started". Senator Henry Cabot Lodge saw in the strike the dangers of the national labor movement: "If the American Federation of Labor succeeds in getting hold of the police in Boston it will go all over the country, and we shall be in measurable distance of Soviet government by labor unions." The Ohio State Journal opposed any sympathetic treatment of the strikers: "When a policeman strikes, he should be debarred not only from resuming his office, but from citizenship as well. He has committed the unpardonable sin; he has forfeited all his rights."

== Aftermath ==
In the police commissioner's Annual Report for 1919, Curtis presented his view of the strike. He argued that he had not needed the requested State Guards for the strike's first night because the city remained quiet and he trusted reports that many policemen would not join. By the end of the year the strikers had formed a new organization called the Association of Former Police of the City of Boston.

The strike gave momentum to Coolidge's political career, and a nationwide reputation for decisive action that was not in keeping with his tendency toward deliberation. In 1918, he had narrowly been elected governor. In 1919 he won 62% of the votes when running against an opponent who favored reinstating the strikers. He failed to carry Boston by just 5,000 votes, an impressive showing for a Republican in a strongly Democratic city. The Boston Transcript reported:

Massachusetts is hailed today from Maine to California as the winner of a shining triumph for straight Americanism. The voting booths of the old Bay State were a battleground for the nation. The ancient faith was under fire. Law and order formed the line of cleavage. The Governor was the Commander-in-chief, the people of the commonwealth were the invincible army, the issue was America, and in the triumph of that issue all America triumphs.

Coolidge himself later said, "No doubt it was the police strike in Boston that brought me into national prominence." In a post-election congratulatory telegram President Wilson wrote: "I congratulate you upon your election as a victory for law and order. When that is the issue, all Americans must stand together." His role in the strike, however limited, became a prominent feature of his resume as he sought higher office. According to one obituary, "the Boston police strike of 1919 ... brought him national prominence and the nomination for the Vice Presidency" in 1920. When he succeeded to the presidency in 1923 upon the death of Warren Harding, the New York Times headlined its biography: "Coolidge Firmness Won Recognition; His Suppression of the Boston Police Strike Made Him a National Figure". Coolidge's political rivals interpreted his role differently. In 1925, U.S. Senator Robert La Follette of Wisconsin said that Coolidge's failure to intervene in that year's coal strike mirrored his 1919 actions when he "persistently refused to act upon the requests of the Mayor of Boston for assistance until riot and bloodshed had aroused the entire State. Then when order had been restored by the efforts of Mayor Peters and the Storrow committee Coolidge sent in the militia and claimed full credit for restoring 'law and order'."

The strike heightened public fear of labor unrest and the possible radicalism that lay behind it. It contributed to the public anxiety of the period known as the Red Scare of 1919–1920. The failure of this and other strikes in the years following World War I contributed to declining union membership in subsequent years. The American Federation of Labor responded to political pressure experienced during the strike and revoked the charters it had granted to police unions. That ended police unionism in the U.S. for two decades, as police would not try to unionize until World War II.

In 1930, a history of the Boston Transcript, the most resolutely anti-union of Boston's newspapers in 1919, perpetuated its original account of urban chaos during the strike's first nights. It described large crowds, including a number of sailors from docked naval ships, that took to the streets, smashing windows, committing robbery and stoning bystanders and cars. It said that the northern, southern, and western areas of the city were all taken over by armed gangs.

Legislation passed by the Massachusetts legislature in 1933 made it easier for police officers who had been off the force for more than a year to apply for reinstatement. It was expected that this would lead to an effort by the former strikers to be rehired, but several subsequent appeals for reinstatement were denied. In 1937, Massachusetts Governor Charles F. Hurley, after meeting with some of the 1919 strikers, backed the decision of Police Commissioner Joseph Timilty not to reinstate them.

The Boston Police Patrolmen's Association was formed in 1965 following the enactment of a state statute allowing state and municipal workers to organize for the sake of collective bargaining.

No police officers in the U.S. went out on strike again until July 1974, when some Baltimore police, estimated at 15% to 50% of the force, refused to report for work for several days as a demonstration of support for other striking municipal unions.

== In popular culture ==
- The Dropkick Murphys album Rock Against Bush Volume 2 includes the song "We Got the Power" about the Boston police strike.
- Dennis Lehane's novel The Given Day is partly set during the Boston police strike.
- Issue number 7 of Alan Moore's comic book series Providence is set on the backdrop of the Boston police strike.

== See also ==
- 1982 Boston arson spree
- Blue flu
- Red Scare of 1919–1920

== Sources ==
- "Official records of the Office of the Police Commissioner, Boston, MA, 1919"
