= Meyer Bloomfield =

American lawyer and social worker

Meyer Bloomfield (February 11, 1878 – March 12, 1938) was an American lawyer and social worker.

== Early life ==
Bloomfield was born on February 11, 1878, in Bucharest, Romania, the son of Morris Bloomfield and Bertha Postmantir.

Bloomfield immigrated to America with his family when he was four and settled on the Lower East Side in New York City, New York, where his father taught English classes for immigrants. In his youth, he participated in activities at the Neighborhood Guild and the University Settlement.

== Education ==
He graduated from the College of the City of New York with an A.B. in 1899, followed by Harvard College with a second A.B. in 1901. He attended Boston University Law School from 1903 to 1905, and in 1905 was admitted to the bar.

== Career ==
Following his graduation from Harvard, he became the first director of the Civic Service House, a settlement house financed by Pauline Agassiz Shaw, in the North End of Boston, Massachusetts. He served as its director until 1910. In 1910, he became director of the Vocational Bureau, which was founded by his former law school professor Frank Parsons. He worked there for the next eight years. He served as president of the National Vocational Guidance Association from 1916 to 1918.

Bloomfield lectured at the Harvard University Summer School from 1911 to 1913 and at the University of California Summer School from 1914 to 1915. In 1916, he was an associate faculty of Teachers College, Columbia University and a special professor of Boston University.

In the winter of 1910, he went to Puerto Rico to study industrial and education conditions there on behalf of the War Department. In the spring of 1912, he went to Europe to study labor exchanges for the United States Bureau of Education. He also served as a vocational expert for the Bureau of Indian Affairs in 1912. When America entered World War I, he went to Washington, D.C. and served in the United States Shipping Board Emergency Fleet Corporation as Head of the Industrial Service Department. He was invited to the position by General George Washington Goethals, Admiral Washington L. Capps, and Admiral Bowles in 1917 to organize the build-up of manpower needed to build ships and provide the right conditions for efficiency. Under him, the shipyards grew from 60,000 people to 400,000 people by 1919.

From October 1918 to January 1919, he was special representative in Europe for The Saturday Evening Post and investigated labor conditions there.

After the war, Bloomfield and his brother Daniel formed the law firm Bloomfield & Bloomfield and worked as industrial relations consultants. They also edited a periodical called Industrial Relations: Bloomfield's Labor Digest. The partnership ended in 1923. He then moved to New York City, where he specialized in immigration law and did consulting work in the industrial relations field.

In 1922, he went to Russia as a confidential advisor to President Warren G. Harding. He later made social studies in other European countries. He was a labor advisor and attorney to a number of large corporations during the 1920s.

In 1929, he was appointed advisor to seniors and professors of vocational guidance at the College of the City of New York. In 1935, he became advisor of Hunter College. He contributed to industrial and popular periodicals and published several books on labor, management, and vocational issues.

== Family ==
In 1902, Bloomfield married concert singer Sylvia Palmer. Their children were Catherine Pauline, Joyce Therese, and Lincoln Palmer.

== Death ==
Bloomfield died in Presbyterian Hospital from stomach cancer that metastasized in the liver on March 12, 1938. Rabbi Charles Fleischer officiated his funeral at the Riverside Memorial Chapel. Several hundred people attended the funeral, including Hunter College president Dr. Eugene A. Colligan, Superintendent of Schools Dr. Harold G. Campbell, Borough President Stanley Isaacs, City College president Dr. Frederick B. Robinson, Mrs. Bernard Deutsch, and a number of educators. He was buried in Mount Pleasant Cemetery in Westchester County.
