= Psychologie der Berufsarbeit und der Berufsberatung (Psychotechnik) II Spezieller Teil =

1922 book by Theodor Erismann and Martha Moers

Psychologie der Berufsarbeit und der Berufsberatung (Psychotechnik) II. Spezieller Teil
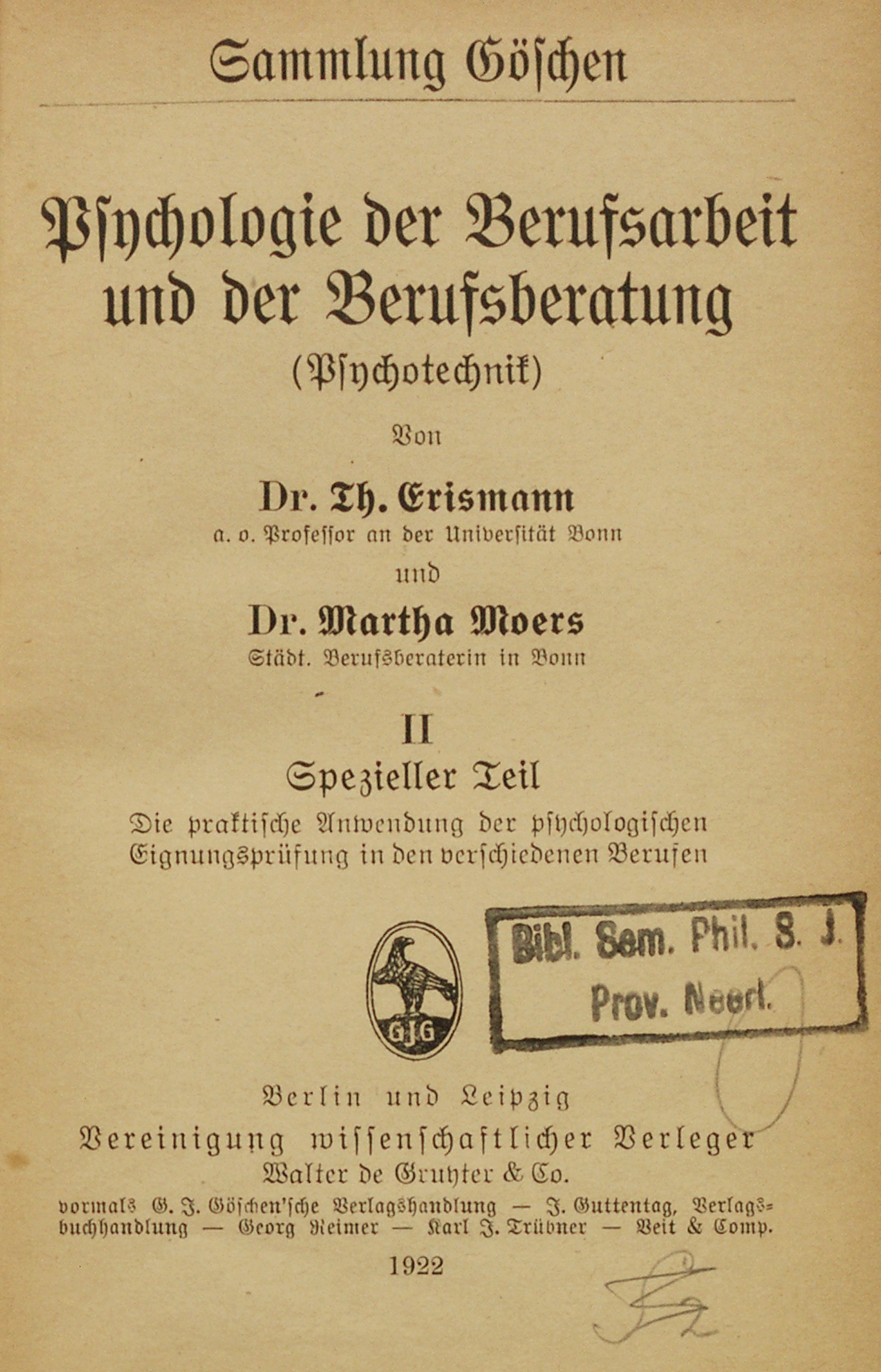
- Title page of book
- Author: Theodor Erismann and Martha Moers
- Language: German
- Subject: Career counseling, psychology
- Publisher: Walter de Grunter & Co, Berlin and Leipzig
- Publication date: 1922
- Publication place: Germany
- Media type: print
- Pages: 114
- Preceded by: Psychologie der Berufsarbeit und der Berufsberatung (Psychotechnik) II.Allgemeiner Teil (1921)

Psychologie der Berufsarbeit und der Berufsberatung (Psychotechnik) II Spezieller Teil (Die praktische Anwendung der psychologischen Eignungsprüfung in den verschiedenen Berufen) is an advice manual for career counseling written by Theodor Erismann and Martha Moers in 1922. Its title translates to Psychology of Work and Career Counseling (Psychotechniques) II Specialized Part (The Practical Application of Psychological Aptitude Tests in Various Careers). Published by Walter de Grunter & Co. in Berlin, it is the second instalment of a series on career counselling. The first volume contains information on the following topics: I. Grundzüge der Psychophysik der Berufsarbeit (Basics of Occupational Psychophysics) II. Berufsberatung auf psychologischer Grundlage (Psychology-based Career Counseling) III. Allgemeine Berufsberatung auf Grundlage der Intelligenzprüfung (Career Counseling Based on Intelligence Testing). While the first book highlights the importance of taking aptitude into account while choosing a career, as well as the applications of career counseling in general, the second volume goes further into aptitude testing for specific jobs. The main section of the book lists common occupations of the time, explores which characteristics and skills are vital for success in the respective fields, and finally introduces established tests for these. Often, intelligence tests based on the work of William Stern are used. In effect, it acts as a book of instructions for psychological career counselling. At the time of writing, Swiss-Austrian psychologist and philosopher Dr. Theodor Erismann (1883–1961) was a Professor of Psychology at the Rheinische Friedrich-Wilhelms Universität Bonn (University of Bonn). Second author, German psychologist Dr. Martha Moers (1877–1966) was the director of the municipal career counseling for the city of Bonn.

== Contents ==
=== I. Eignungsprüfungen in den einzelnen Berufen ===
This section concerns aptitude tests for various, specific careers.

1. Die Verkehrsberufe covers careers in transportation and traffic, such as Straßenbahnführer (Tram driver), Kraftfahrer (lorry driver) and Lokomotivführer (train driver). Although all three of these careers are very similar, differences in required abilities are still highlighted. For instance, the lack of tracks to guide lorry drivers provides an additional difficulty not present for tram and train drivers. All three careers require fast reaction times, decisiveness, stamina and calmness. Aptitude tests for pilots (Flugzeugführer) are also briefly discussed, though the authors note that these are of little use during times of peace, and are included only for completeness sake.
2. Der Facharbeiter der Metallindustrie concerns testing for workers in the metal industry.
3. Der Kanzleiangestellte und der kaufmännisch Angestellte covers demands for legal assistants as well as merchants.
4. Der Schriftsetzer und Buchdrucker goes over ideal characteristics for workers in the printing business, specifically for typesetters and printers.
5. Die Telephonistin (switchboard operator) is the only career for women covered in the book.
6. Der Telegraphist und Funker explores available aptitude tests for telegraph and radio operators.
7. Der Feuerwehrangestellte Firefighting is the only occupation for which medical aptitude tests, particularly concerning breathing patterns, are recommended in addition to psychological ones. Notably, psychological aptitude tests include those meant to assess skittishness, for instance by asking an applicant to perform precise movements (set down a full pail of water) while being exposed to unexpected sounds.
8. Der Kriminalbeamte concerns the necessary abilities for work as a police officer and detective.
9. Der Damenfriseur details the skills required by women's hair dressers, such as the ability to perform precise actions with both hands simultaneously.
10. Psychotechnisch wenig durcharbeitete Berufe: Holzgewerbe, Baugewerbe, Landwirtschaft, Schneiderberuf, höhere Berufe This section explores careers and occupations with no or poorly developed psychological aptitude tests. This includes jobs in Lumbering, construction, agriculture, tailoring and dressmaking and academia. Despite the lack of established aptitude tests, potential characteristics to test for are discussed. For example, results from questionnaires completed by vocational school teachers for these careers are presented. For instance, a stock breeder is associated with good eyesight (Sehschärfe) and colour vision (Farbentüchtigkeit), well-developed tactile abilities (Feinheit des Tastsinnes), good memory, general intelligence, stamina, cleanliness, an aesthetic sense, as well as the general ability to handle animals.

=== II. Praktischer Wert und Soziale Bedeutung der Psychotechnik ===
The second section of the book concerns the practical and social value of psychotechniques. It introduces criteria to assess the actual accuracy of specific tests in predicting future job performance. Criteria include the direct comparison of the performance of workers selected via aptitude testing and those selected without them, a better performance in aptitude tests by those already working in the corresponding career versus those who have no experience, and a correlation between existing employees' job performance and aptitude test performance.

== Psychologie der Berufsberatung and Career Counseling ==
At the time of publishing, career counselling was a relatively new, but quickly developing field. It is often said to have begun with the publication of Frank Parsons' book Choosing a Vocation in 1909. In Germany, offices for career counselling emerged during the early 20th century, starting with Josephine Levy-Rathenau's Auskunftsstelle für Frauenberufe (English: Information office for jobs for women) in 1902. Psychologie der Berufsberatung, published in 1922, acts as a summary of established findings and accepted tests in the field. Perhaps at odds with career counseling today is the authors' focus on testing whether an individual is well suited for a specific occupation, rather than performing a series of tests to determine where a client's talents lie and offering advice on potential careers based on this. Today, career counselling most often concentrates on this advisory aspect of aptitude testing. Despite the title, Erismann and Moers describe tools for potential employers more than they do tools for self-discovery of one talents. This is also reflected in the notable absence of tests meant to reveal areas of interest rather than just those of talent, as are commonplace in today's career counselling. However, despite this particular book's apparent lack of focus on the individual and their personal development, other books by the authors', particularly Erismann, highlight the importance of a well-chosen profession for overall happiness.

== Literature ==
- Erismann, Theodor & Moers, Martha. Psychologie der Berufsarbeit und der Berufsberatung (Psychotechnik) II Spezieller Teil (Die praktische Anwendung der psychologischen Eignungsprüfung in den verschiedenen Berufen). Walter de Grunter & Co. 1922.
