= 1901 Massachusetts gubernatorial election =

- November 5, 1901
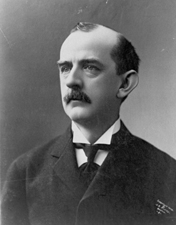

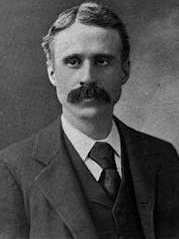
Nominee	W. Murray Crane	Josiah Quincy VI
Party	Republican	Democratic
Popular vote	185,809	114,362
Percentage	57.26%	35.24%
- Crane: 40-50% 50–60% 60–70% 70–80% 80–90% >90% Quincy: 40-50% 50–60% 60–70%
Governor before election
W. Murray Crane
Republican
Elected Governor
W. Murray Crane
Republican

The 1901 Massachusetts gubernatorial election was held on November 5, 1901. Incumbent Republican Governor W. Murray Crane was re-elected to a third term in office.

== General election ==
=== Candidates ===
- Michael T. Berry (Socialist Labor)
- W. Murray Crane, incumbent governor since 1900 (Republican)
- John B. Lewis (Prohibition)
- Josiah Quincy VI, former mayor of Boston (Democratic)
- George H. Wrenn (Social Democratic)

=== Results ===
1901 Massachusetts gubernatorial election
Party	Candidate	Votes	%	±%
Republican	W. Murray Crane (incumbent)	185,809	57.26%	▼1.80
Democratic	Josiah Quincy VI	114,362	35.24%	▲1.55
Social Democratic	George H. Wrenn	10,671	3.29%	▼0.14
Socialist Labor	Michael T. Berry	8,898	2.74%	▲0.46
Prohibition	John B. Lewis	4,780	1.47%	▲0.23
Write-in	All others	8	0.00%	Steady
Total votes		324,528	100.00%	

== See also ==
- 1901 Massachusetts legislature

== Bibliography ==
- Office of the Secretary of the Commonwealth (1910). Election Statistics, 1901. Boston, MA: Wright & Potter Printing Co., State Printers.
