= Civic Service House =

Coordinates: 42.3646°N 71.0557°W

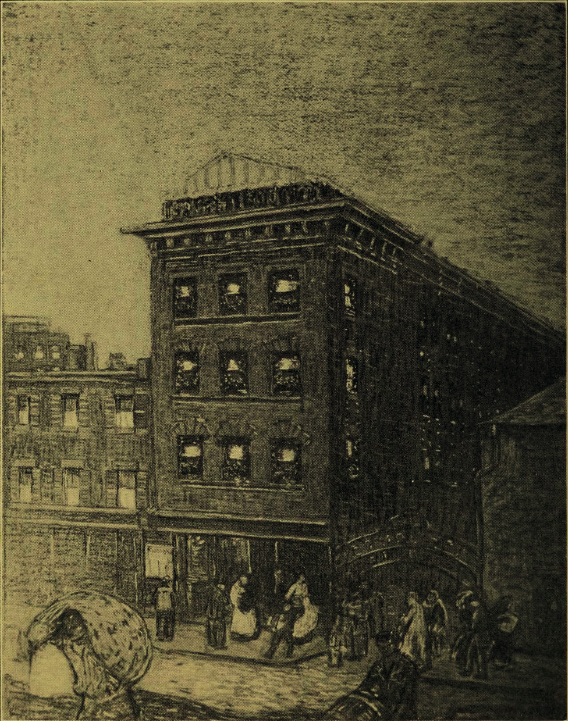
Civic Service House

Civic Service House was an American social settlement and a school for citizenship, located at 110-112 Salem Street, Boston, Massachusetts. Established October, 1901, by Pauline Agassiz Shaw as a center for civic education, recreation, and organization for the common good. The house set out to do specialized settlement work along civic lines, and purposed to reach a constituency approaching or within the privileges of citizenship. The character of work was that with adult immigrants, in clubs, classes, lectures and civic committees. The constituency included Jews, Italians, Poles and Irish. Improvement clubs, educational classes for men and women, occasional concerts and recreational features were available, but these were subordinate to the effort for civic betterment. Children's work was not included, and social features were made incidental to a program of study and service.

== History ==
A 1917 history of Shaw's life notes: "The Civic Service House was founded in 1901 when immigration reached its half-million mark. The following ten years, the new immigration poured in at the phenomenal rate of a million a year. Boston was then the second largest port, and the North End, where the old immigration station was located, was the great gateway, second only to Ellis Island. Shaw saw the opportunities for civic service in this field and dedicated the House at the very outset to the constructive citizenship of adult immigrant wage earners. The Civic Service House addressed itself particularly to the task of articulating these minorities to the country's body politic.

"Between 1901 and 1917, three waves of immigration swept over the North End and out into the U.S. — the Jewish, the Italian, the Polish. To each movement, the House contributed its quota of leadership, — men and women schooled in democracy. In the early days, when the night school was but a way station for young boys who had prematurely left the day school, the Civic Service House Night School was a pioneer in this field of Americanization. Later, when the public night schools began to function in the neighborhood, it was able to contribute not only interpreters and teachers specially trained for the new task, but new textbooks designed to meet the particular needs of adult immigrants.

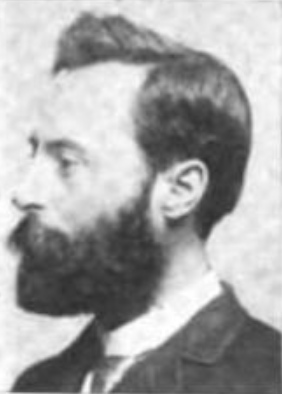
Frank Parsons

"In 1907, when the classes for wage earners, grouped under what was called the Breadwinners' Institute, were about to be organized for the year at the Civic Service House, it was thought that the help of a counselor, experienced to the daily economic problems of the workers, at the disposal of the men and women who came to the classes, would be of benefit and make the classwork more fruitful. Fortunately, Prof. Frank Parsons was one of the volunteer members of the Civic Service House staff and the suggestion enlisted his warm support. He submitted plans for a Vocation Bureau which would be open not only to the members but to all who wished to come for help in their life-work problems. Shaw was consulted about the plan, and she saw at once the far-reaching character of such an undertaking. The first Vocation Bureau in the country was opened in the fall of 1907. Parsons lived but a year to see the start of what became a recognized function of public education."

Shaw died in 1917 with no provision in her will for the maintenance of the house, and it closed in September of that year.

== Neighborhood ==
A 1911 description of the Civic Service House observes: "The life amidst the extensive waterfront, running from the South Station to North Station on one side, the business district on the other, and the great market district in the middle, surges about the crowded tenement quarter. The docks and warehouses, the wholesale groceries and fruit establishments, the immense candy and cigar factories, the furniture shops,—these were a few among the countless industries fast developing in what was once the residential part of Boston.

"The North End dwellers were chiefly those whose work and necessities keep them there. These included the Italians, on account of the vegetable, fruit and fish markets; and the Jews, because of the many garment industries which supplied not only the local market, but a large part of the big business district including some of the largest department stores. Almost all the old residences were demolished or altered into stores or shops, where dress goods were made and sold on an enormous scale, while Polish families in the side streets were conveverting old tenements into teeming boarding houses."

== Activities ==
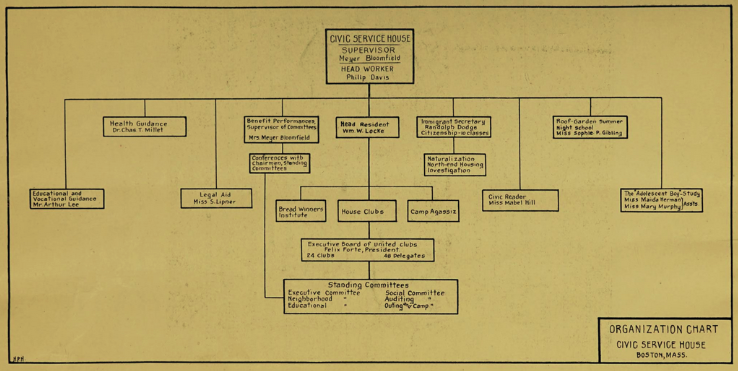
Organization chart

=== Labor ===
The House helped to organize a number of trade unions among garment making and other sweated trades, and has opened its rooms for labor meetings at critical periods. It also secured a peaceable settlement of some labor difficulties. The Women's Trade Union League was organized in the house.

=== Education ===
A resident holds the position of Supervisor of Licensed Minors, and developed a plan of self government among some three thousand boys selling papers. The house organized the first group of graduates of the city night schools, which is now working to secure extended evening educational opportunities for its district.

=== Streets and Sanitation ===
The House secured the co-operation of the young people of the district in caring for the city streets, and through its civic work has been able to create a more enlightened public opinion in sanitary matters. A member of the house was the first woman sanitary inspector in the city and looks after the district. The pamphlet, A Handbook for the Citizens, had a city-wide use.

=== Vocational ===
In January, 1908, Prof. Frank Parsons organized the work of helping boys and girls to make the most of their lives by finding and doing work best-fitted for them. Prof. Parsons' method, involving analysis, suggestion, and advice, was embodied in his Choosing a Vocation, published 1909 by Houghton, Mimin and Company. The Vocation Bureau has since been independently organized and with the official recognition and co-operation of the school board is planning wide service.

=== Civic Leadership ===
In cooperation with its neighbors, the House has taken a keen interest in various city and state measures affecting the welfare of the district, and has given its strength and experience as opportunity arose.

=== Other ===
The Civic Service House also maintained the Breadwinners' Institute (with classes in public speaking, debating, literature, English, history, and government); special vocational lectures; a night school; school for citizenship; various services connected with obtaining naturalization; lectures; public meetings; socials, summer work; a roof garden; a night school for immigrants; picnics and excursions; dances; club meetings; vacations at the House Camp at West Gloucester, Massachusetts.

== Residents ==
In 1911, the residents included one woman and eight men. There were also six volunteers. Head residents included, Meyer Bloomfield (1901-1910); and Philip Davis (January 1911-).

== Selected works ==
- The Record of Civic Service House, A Social Settlement, 1915 (Text)

== See also ==
- Settlement and community houses in the United States
