= Edwin Upton Curtis =

American politician (1861–1922)

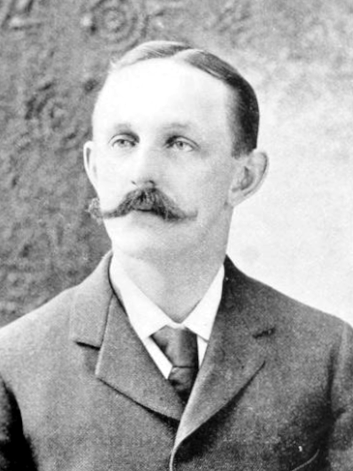
- Curtis circa 1896

Commissioner of the Boston Police Department
- In office December 30, 1918 – March 28, 1922
- Preceded by: Stephen O'Meara
- Succeeded by: Herbert A. Wilson

Mayor of Boston
- In office January 7, 1895 – January 6, 1896
- Preceded by: Nathan Matthews Jr.
- Succeeded by: Josiah Quincy

City Clerk of Boston, Massachusetts
- In office 1889–1890
- Preceded by: Joseph H. O'Neil
- Succeeded by: J. Mitchel Galvin

Personal details
- Born: May 26, 1861 Roxbury, Boston, Massachusetts, U.S.
- Died: March 28, 1922 (aged 60) Back Bay, Boston, Massachusetts, U.S.
- Party: Republican
- Education: Roxbury Latin School
- Alma mater: Bowdoin College
- Profession: Attorney

Edwin Upton Curtis (May 26, 1861 – March 28, 1922) was an American attorney and politician from Massachusetts who served as the mayor of Boston (1895–1896). Later, as Boston Police Commissioner (1918–1922), his refusal to recognize the trade union formed by the department's officers provoked the 1919 Boston Police Strike.

== Early years ==
Curtis was the son of George and Martha Ann (Upton) Curtis, who were seventh-generation Bostonians. After attending the grammar and Latin schools in Roxbury, Curtis went to the little Blue Family School for Boys in Farmington, Maine. He graduated from Bowdoin College.

== Career ==
After apprenticing with former Massachusetts governor (and former Boston mayor) William Gaston, Curtis studied law and took the bar. He and a Bowdoin classmate formed the law firm Curtis & Reed. He also became active in politics as a member of the Republican Party.

=== Mayoralty ===
After serving as Boston city clerk from 1889 to 1890, Curtis was elected Boston mayor in December 1894, serving a one-year term in office from January 1895 to January 1896.

In his inaugural address, Curtis discussed the importance of spending on educational facilities, advocated for a board of election commissioners, providing for public parks, and internal auditing within the city. His mayoralty was characterized the curtailment of expenses. He created a board of four men tasked with overseeing elections, made up of two Democrats and two Republicans.

In the election of December 1895, Curtis was defeated for re-election by Josiah Quincy. Curtis ran against Quincy again in December 1897, with the same outcome.

=== Post-mayoralty ===
After leaving the mayoralty, Curtis was successively Boston's Assistant United States Treasurer and then the Collector of the Port. In December 1918, Curtis was appointed as the Commissioner of the Boston Police Department by Governor Samuel McCall. He was sworn into office on December 30 at the Governor's home in Winchester, Massachusetts.

=== Boston Police Strike ===
In 1919, in response to rumors that Boston policemen planned to form a union, Curtis issued a statement denying that police officers had any right to form a union, much less one affiliated with a larger organization like the American Federation of Labor (AFL). In August of that year, the AFL issued a charter to the Boston Police Union. Curtis said the union's leaders were insubordinate and planned to relieve them of duty, but said that he would suspend the sentence if the union was dissolved by September 4. Boston mayor Andrew James Peters convinced Curtis to delay his action for a few days, but Curtis ultimately suspended the union leaders on September 8.

The following day, about three-quarters of the policemen in Boston went on strike. That night and the next, there was sporadic violence and rioting in the lawless city. Mayor Peters, concerned about sympathy strikes, had called up some units of the Massachusetts National Guard stationed in the Boston area and relieved Curtis of duty. Massachusetts Governor Calvin Coolidge, furious that the mayor had called out state guard units, finally acted. He called up more units of the National Guard, restored Curtis to office, and took personal control of the police force.

Samuel Gompers of the AFL recognized that the strike was damaging the cause of labor in the public mind and advised the strikers to return to work. Commissioner Curtis remained adamant and refused to re-hire the striking policemen, and Coolidge called for a new police force to be recruited.

== Legacy ==
Curtis served as Police Commissioner until his sudden death in 1922; The Boston Globe wrote that he had "sacrificed his life to duty". Curtis plays a key role in Dennis Lehane's 2008 novel, The Given Day. The Edwin Upton Curtis Memorial is installed along the Charles River Esplanade.

== See also ==
- Timeline of Boston, 1880s-1920s

Political offices
Preceded by Joseph H. O'Neil	Boston City Clerk; 1889–1890	Succeeded by J. Mitchel Galvin
Preceded by Nathan Matthews Jr.	Mayor of Boston; 1895–1896	Succeeded by Josiah Quincy
Preceded by George H. Lyman	Collector of Customs for the Port of Boston; 1909–1913	Succeeded by Edmund Billings
Preceded by Stephen O'Meara	Commissioner of the Boston Police Department; 1918–1922	Succeeded by Herbert A. Wilson
