= Oliver Garrett =

American police officer (1895-1979)

- Born: Oliver Bridge Garrett; October 14, 1895; Mechanic Falls, Maine, U.S.
- Died: November 14, 1979 (aged 84); Yacolt, Washington, U.S.
- Other names: Ollie; The Million Dollar Cop
- Spouse(s): Lillian Crowell (m. 1915; died 1921) Florence Harding Reden Woodside (m. 1923; died 1939) Althea Veasey (1940–1979; his death)
- Police career
- Department: Boston Police Department
- Service years: 1919–1929
- Rank: Special officer

Oliver "Ollie" Bridge Garrett (October 14, 1895 – November 14, 1979) was the leader of the Boston Police Department's liquor raiding unit during Prohibition. On a police salary of $40.36 a week, Garrett managed to bank more than $122,000, owned a $70,000 farm, a Boston town house, and several cars. In May 1930, he pleaded guilty to charges of extortion and sentenced to two years in Deer Island Prison.

== Early life ==
Garrett was born October 14, 1895^{1} in Mechanic Falls, Maine. He grew up in Farmington, Maine, where his father ran a hotel. When Garrett was fifteen he ran away to Boston. From 1911 to 1915 he worked as a salesman for a bakery business. On July 24, 1915, he married Lillian Crowell in Boston. From 1915 to 1918 he was a foreman for H. P. Hood & Sons. During World War I he served in the Quartermaster Corps. On October 7, 1921, Lillian Garrett died at the age of 26. On June 17, 1923, he married Florence Harding Reden Woodside, a nurse who had taken care of his first wife. Woodside, who was fourteen his senior, was married twice before. Her first husband died and her second marriage ended in divorce shortly before she married Garrett. At the time of their marriage, Garrett had $28.16, which he withdrew for a honeymoon in Rockland, Massachusetts.

== Boston Police Department ==
On November 7, 1919, Garrett joined the Boston Police Department. He was assigned to the Charlestown Station as a patrolman. He was later made a liquor officer, then a special officer. Following a transfer to the South End, Garrett was noticed by Captain Charles Reardon, who had him transferred to his liquor squad on June 17, 1923.

Garrett was the head of the liquor squad's raiding unit. He led over 25,000 raids, which resulted in 17,000 arrests and the seizure of several million gallons of alcohol. Many of Garrett's raids took place without a warrant and were later found to be unlawful. On September 20, 1925, Police Commissioner Herbert A. Wilson requested that the civil service commission promote Garrett to sergeant based on his excellent work as an alcohol raider. However he was denied the promotion due to his low rating (he was 69th on the list).

Despite Garrett's raids, there was still plenty of liquor in Boston. Walter Liggett described bootlegging as "the largest and best paying racket" in the city and estimated that the people of Boston spent $60 million in illegal alcohol. By 1928 there were 4,000 speakeasies in Boston, including four on the same block as police headquarters.

In 1928, Commissioner Wilson conducted a secret investigation into Garrett. He found Garrett's extensive real estate and business holdings as well as his close association with a known bootlegger to be "suspicious" and "highly imprudent" but did not believe there was enough evidence to bring charges against him.

In February 1929 the owner of the Hotel Ritz claimed that an associate of Garrett's had solicited a bribe from him in exchange for protection from raids. Six months later, Wilson transferred Garrett, stating that Garrett had been in the same position for too long. After finding out about the transfer, Garrett was quoted by several newspapers as saying that he would "blow the lid off the Boston Police Department". Garrett later denied making this statement and an investigation by commissioner Wilson cleared him.

On September 4, 1929, Garrett was scheduled to return from vacation and begin night duty in Beacon Hill. However, before he was to report for his new assignment, Garrett was thrown from a horse while participating in races at the Marshfield Fair and went on sick leave. On September 27, Garrett announced his retirement and requested a disability pension for a skull fracture he suffered in an on-duty car accident two years earlier. Deputy Superintendent James McDevitt and Superintendent Michael H. Crowley opposed the pension, as they could not determine whether Garrett's injuries were sustained in the auto accident or at the Marshfield Fair. However, on October 23, Commissioner Wilson overruled them and granted Garrett a pension.

== Investigations and guilty plea ==
Senator Joseph J. Mulhern, who had been a critic of the Boston Police Department for many years, attacked Garrett's pension, presenting evidence at a Joint Committee on Rules hearing that Garrett's physician was unable to find evidence of a skull fracture and that Garrett hadn't missed work after the accident. In 1930, the Massachusetts House of Representatives Ways and Means Committee voted to request that the Massachusetts Attorney General investigate Garrett's pension.

Attorney General Joseph E. Warner began his investigation into Garrett on March 3, 1930. The inquiry was extended in to all matters connected with his service as a police officer. The investigation uncovered fifteen bank accounts, most of which were in his wife's name. Garrett and/or his wife were found to have possessed a 11.5 acre dairy farm in Hingham, Massachusetts, houses in Allston and Newton, Massachusetts, an apartment in downtown Boston, a horse racing stable, a fleet of automobiles (including a Cadillac, Marmon, and Chrysler), diamonds rings, and expensive wardrobes. Their personal property was valued at $225,000 and their bank balances were over to $100,000. Garrett refused to testify at the inquiry. Warner filed his report with the House on May 1, 1930. He found that between 1925 and 1929, Garrett had taken graft from criminals. He also concluded that Garrett's pension had been fraudulently obtained through the "active intervention" of Commissioner Wilson, who had requested that the examining physician change his report so that it would allow Wilson to give Garrett a pension instead of discharging him as unfit for duty. On May 2, Boston Mayor James Michael Curley ordered that Garrett's pension be stopped.

Warner turned over evidence of Garrett's crimes to district attorney William J. Foley. On May 29, 1930, Garrett, his wife, and a third co-defendant, Lillian V. Hatch, were indicted for his extorting Hotel Ritz owner John F. Sullivan. Garrett was charged with 152 counts of conspiracy, extortion, and receiving gratuities from July 1924 to August 1928. His wife was charged with 23 counts of conspiracy and aiding and abetting the commission of a felony. Hatch charged with 133 counts of conspiracy and aiding and abetting.

The weekend before the trial was to begin, Garrett evaded two members of the Pinkerton National Detective Agency hired by Foley and became a fugitive. After five months in hiding, Garrett decided to turn himself in. On December 1, 1930, he returned to Boston and surrendered at the police station in Charlestown.

On January 28, 1931, Judge Patrick M. Keating ruled that the six year statute of limitations had passed on one of the indictments and ordered that not guilty verdicts be returned on 100 of the counts against Garrett, 14 of the counts against Mrs. Garrett, and 86 of the counts against Hatch. The jury was unable to reach a verdict on the remaining counts after 26 hours of deliberation. A second trial was held in March 1931. This one too ended without a verdict, as after 167 hours of deliberation, the jury was split 8 to 4 in favor of a conviction for Garrett, 7 to 5 in favor of convicting Hatch, and evenly split on Mrs. Garrett. A third trial was scheduled to begin on May 7, 1931, however Garrett suddenly changed his plea to guilty to avoid putting his wife, who had become ill, through the strain of a third trial. He was sentenced to two years in the Deer Island House of Correction and fined $100.

== Later life ==
Garrett was released from Deer Island on February 21, 1933. Following his release, Garrett worked briefly as an emcee at a nightclub in Saugus, Massachusetts. However, he was not well-suited for the job and opened a garage.

On November 30, 1938, Florence Garrett filed for divorce. However, due to her ill health, the petition was delayed. On March 19, 1939, she collapsed while walking with a friend in Brookline and died. Garrett later married Althea Veasey. On June 10, 1939, their first child, a daughter named Althea was born. The couple had three sons and another daughter.

In 1944, Garrett sued the city of Boston for $25,000 in pension and interest. The city's legal department defaulted by failing to answer interrogatories and in November 1949, Garrett was awarded a $19,492 judgement. The city filed a petition to vacate the judgement and in October 1952 Garrett accepted a $4,567 settlement from the city.

After receiving the settlement, Garrett and his family moved to Ramona, California. In 1974 they moved to Vancouver, Washington. Garrett died on November 14, 1979, in Yacolt, Washington. He is interred in Vancouver.

== Notes ==
1. Garrett's birth certificate gives his date of birth as October 14, 1895, however on his application to the police department he gave his date of birth as October 14, 1894.
