= Edwin Upton Curtis Memorial =

Memorial in Boston, Massachusetts, U.S.

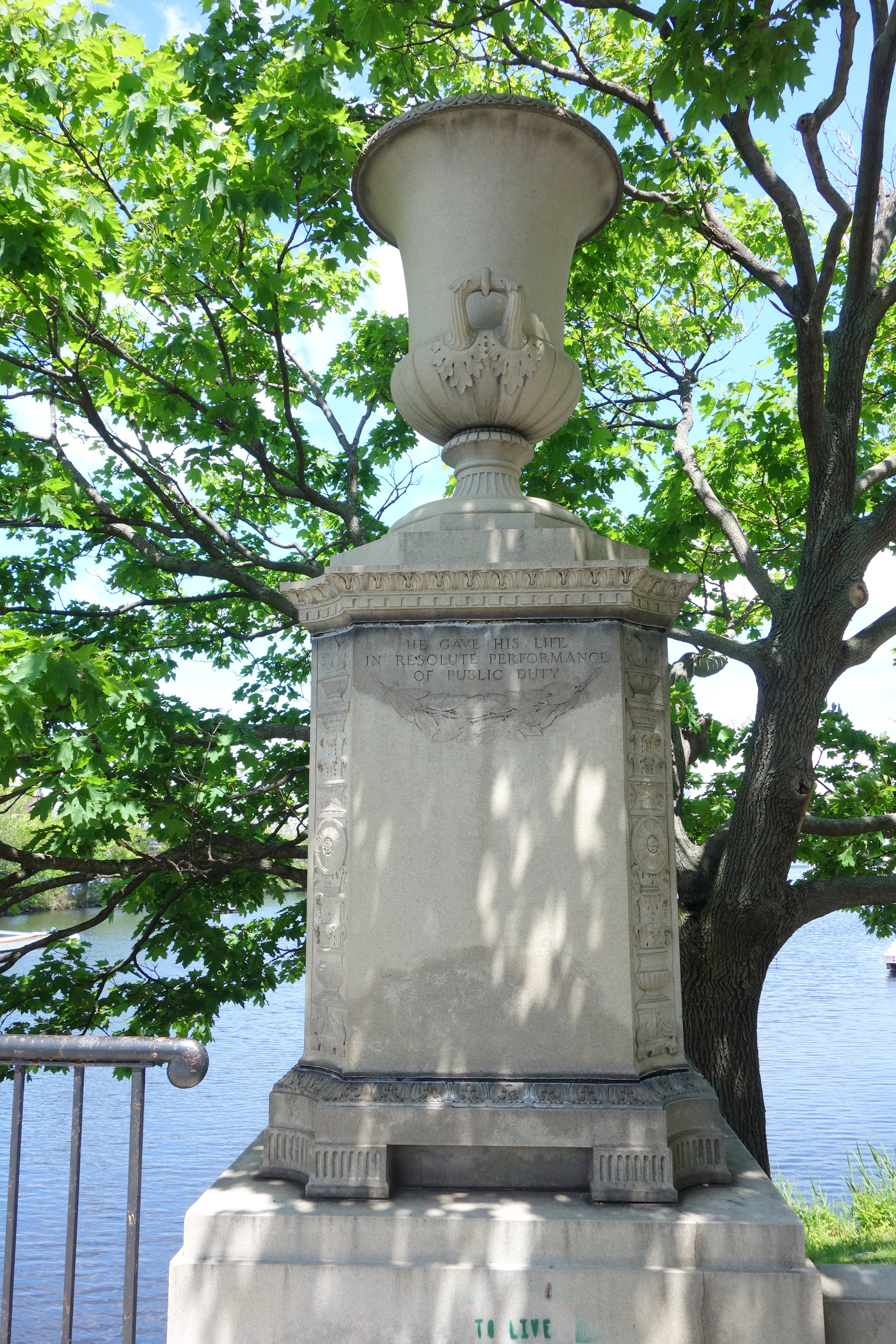
- One of the memorial's two urns in 2014
- Interactive map of Edwin Upton Curtis Memorial
- Location: Charles River Esplanade, Boston, Massachusetts, U.S.
- Coordinates: 42°21′25.9″N 71°4′27.6″W
- Type: Memorial
- Beginning date: 1923
- Completion date: 1924
- Dedicated to: Edwin Upton Curtis

The Edwin Upton Curtis Memorial is a memorial commemorating Edwin Upton Curtis, installed along Boston's Charles River Esplanade, in the U.S. state of Massachusetts. The memorial features two large urns, and was originally installed near Clarendon Street during 1923–1924 before being relocation to their current position near the Hatch Shell.
