= 1897 Boston mayoral election =

Election in Massachusetts, United States

- December 21, 1897
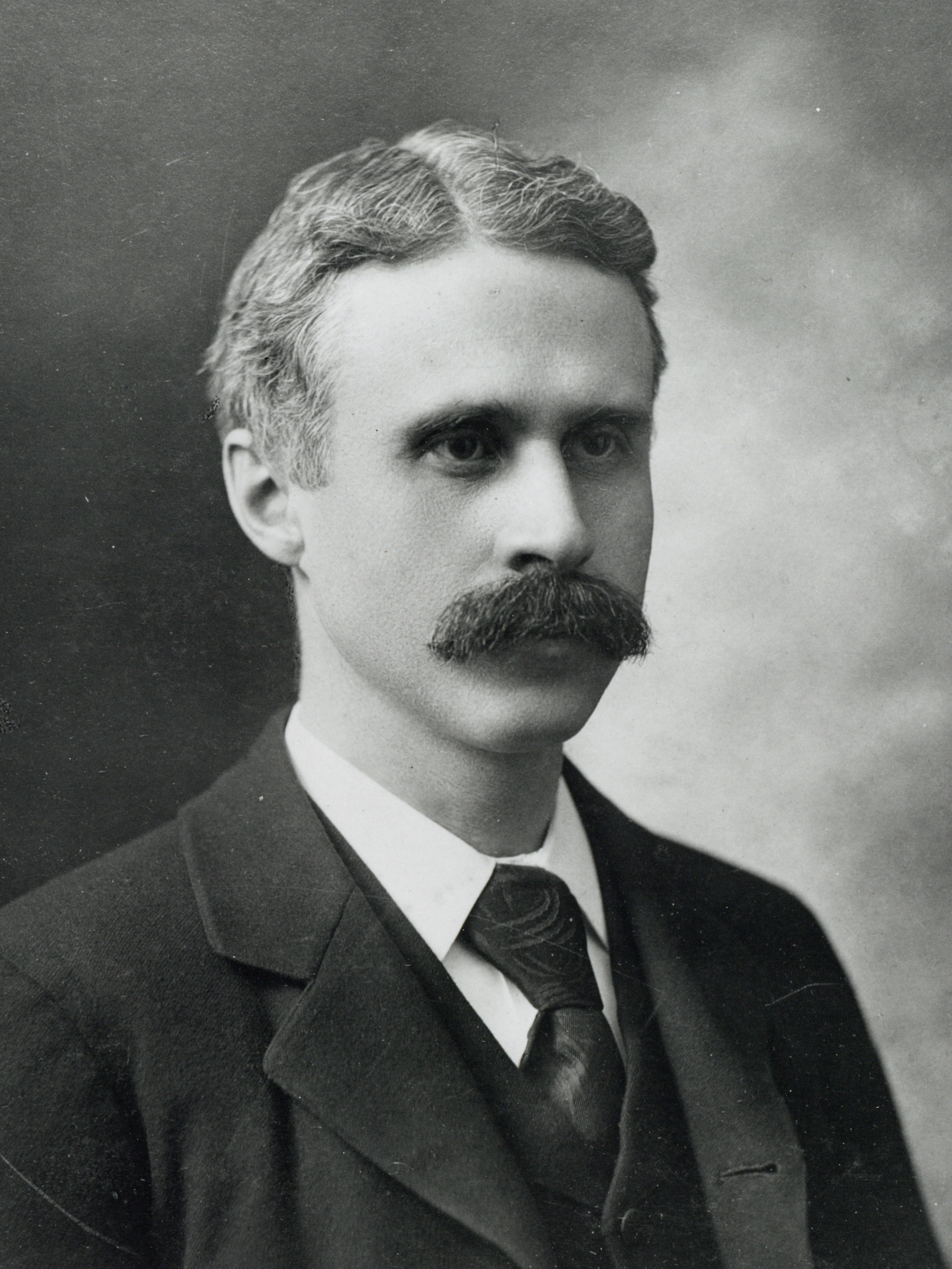

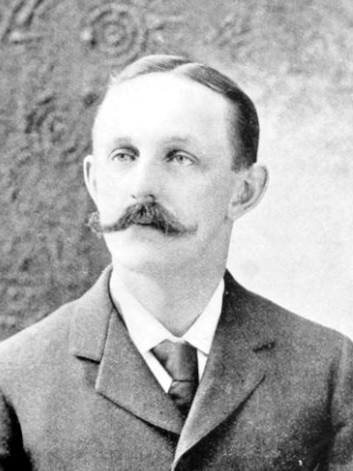
Candidate	Josiah Quincy	Edwin Upton Curtis
Party	Democratic	Republican
Popular vote	39,984	35,947
Percentage	50.1%	45.1%
Mayor before election
Josiah Quincy
Democratic
Elected mayor
Josiah Quincy
Democratic

The Boston mayoral election of 1897 occurred on Tuesday, December 21, 1897. In a rematch of the previous election, Democratic incumbent mayor Josiah Quincy defeated Republican former mayor Edwin Upton Curtis to win re-election to a second term. In addition to Curtis, Quincy also defeated two minor challengers.

Quincy was inaugurated for his second term on Monday, January 3, 1898.

== Candidates ==
- Edwin Upton Curtis (Republican), former Mayor of Boston (1895), and City Clerk of Boston (1889–1890)
- David Goldstein (Socialist Labor)
- Josiah Quincy (Democrat), Mayor of Boston since 1896, former member of the Massachusetts House of Representatives (1887–1888, 1890–1891), and United States Assistant Secretary of State (1893)
- Thomas Riley (Bryan Democrat), attorney—the Bryan Democrats had split away from Democrats in Boston who had "repudiated the Chicago platform" (a reference to the 1896 Democratic National Convention and presidential nominee William Jennings Bryan)

== Results ==
Candidates		General Election	
Candidates		Votes	%
D	Josiah Quincy (incumbent)	39,984	50.1%
R	Edwin Upton Curtis	35,947	45.1%
BD	Thomas Riley	3,000	3.8%
SLP	David Goldstein	825	1.0%
all others		7	0.0%

== See also ==
- List of mayors of Boston, Massachusetts
