= 1895 Boston mayoral election =

Election in Massachusetts, United States

- December 10, 1895
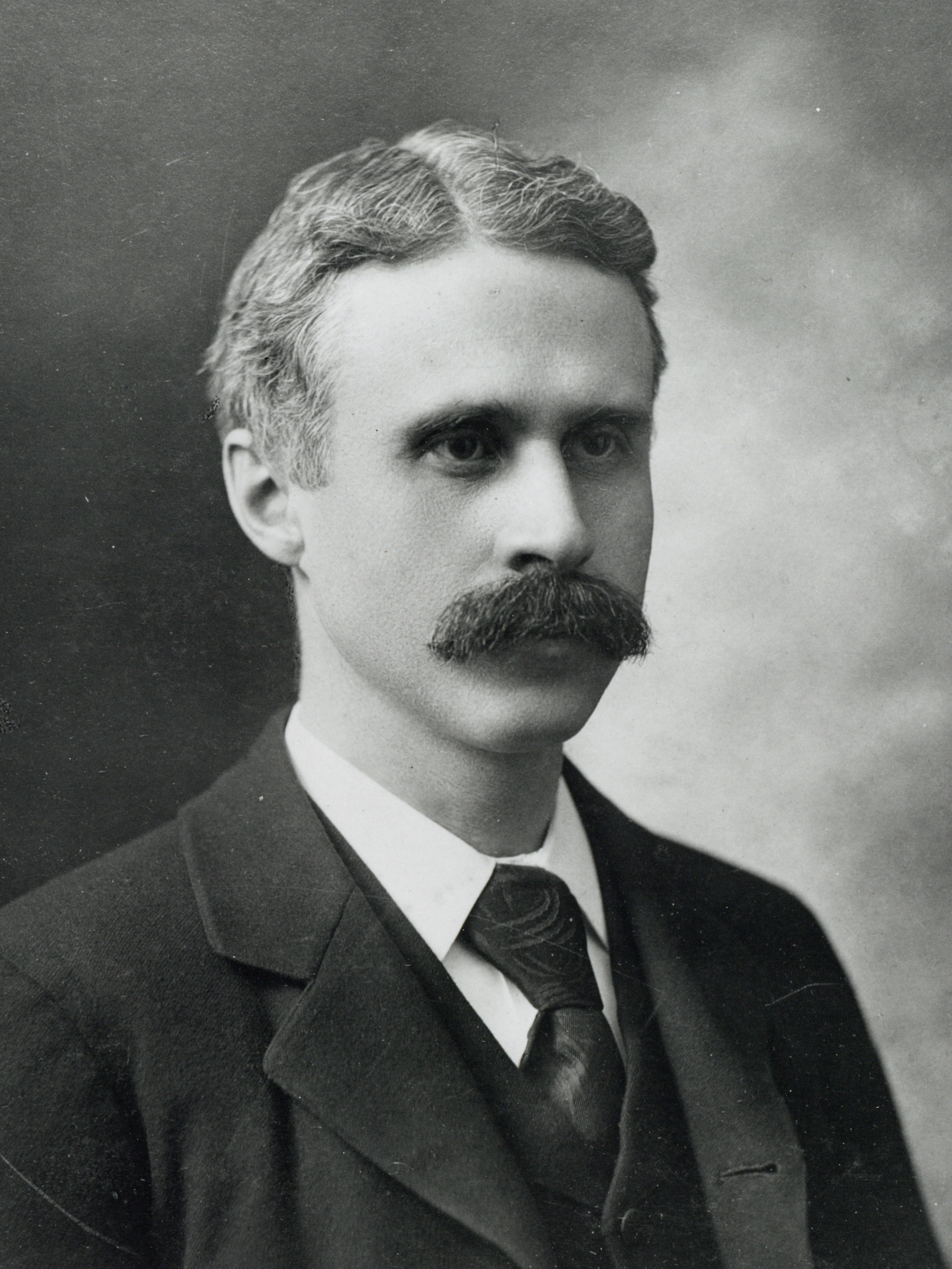

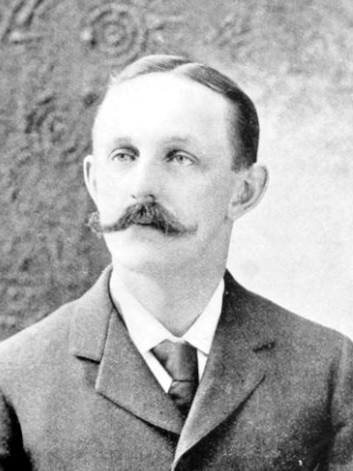
Candidate	Josiah Quincy	Edwin Upton Curtis
Party	Democratic	Republican
Popular vote	40,270	35,864
Percentage	52.5%	46.7%
Mayor before election
Edwin Upton Curtis
Republican
Elected mayor
Josiah Quincy
Democratic

The Boston mayoral election of 1895 occurred on Tuesday, December 10, 1895. Democratic nominee Josiah Quincy defeated Republican incumbent mayor Edwin Upton Curtis and one other contender to win election to his first term.

Due to a change of the city charter in June 1895, this was the first Boston mayoral election for a two-year term; prior mayoral elections had been held annually.

Quincy was inaugurated on Monday, January 6, 1896. His grandfather Josiah Quincy IV (known as Josiah Quincy Jr.) and great-grandfather Josiah Quincy III also had served as Mayors of Boston.

== Candidates ==
- Edwin Upton Curtis (Republican), incumbent Mayor of Boston, former City Clerk of Boston (1889–1890)
- Frank Parsons (Municipal Reform), "lecturer on insurance at Boston University"—referred to as the candidate for the "municipal reform party", "a fusion of prohibitionists, labor, populists, and socialists" Parsons was a Populist.
- Josiah Quincy (Democrat), former member of the Massachusetts House of Representatives (1887–1888, 1890–1891), and United States Assistant Secretary of State (1893)

== Results ==
Candidates		General Election	
Candidates		Votes	%
D	Josiah Quincy	40,270	52.5%
R	Edwin Upton Curtis (incumbent)	35,864	46.7%
MR	Frank Parsons	585	0.8%
all others		2	0.0%

=== Results by ward ===
Ward	Quincy		Curtis		Parsons	
Ward	Votes	%	Votes	%	Votes	%
1	1,636	42.49	2,202	57.19	12	0.31
2	1,996	71.41	793	28.37	6	0.21
3	1,720	66.95	836	32.54	13	0.51
4	1,172	51.49	1,081	47.50	23	1.01
5	1,504	63.25	861	36.21	13	0.55
6	1,410	77.56	402	22.11	6	0.33
7	920	72.78	335	26.50	9	0.71
8	1,464	76.69	421	22.05	24	1.26
9	670	37.41	1,106	61.75	15	0.84
10	359	30.48	807	68.51	12	1.02
11	1,102	28.82	2,683	70.16	39	1.02
12	1,083	71.20	425	27.94	13	0.85
13	2,285	83.46	440	16.07	13	0.47
14	2,736	59.92	1,797	39.36	33	0.72
15	2,011	66.55	988	32.69	23	0.76
16	1,353	64.34	726	34.52	24	1.14
17	1,199	47.83	1,280	51.06	28	1.12
18	937	36.59	1,600	62.48	24	0.94
19	1,835	58.25	1,277	40.54	38	1.21
20	2,806	56.32	2,147	43.10	29	0.58
21	1,812	36.65	3,110	62.90	22	0.44
22	2,218	61.20	1,388	38.29	19	0.52
23	2,243	42.44	2,980	56.39	62	1.17
24	2,615	36.24	4,528	62.75	73	1.01
25	1,184	41.59	1,651	57.99	12	0.42

== See also ==
- List of mayors of Boston, Massachusetts
