= Herbert A. Wilson =

American politician (1870-1934)

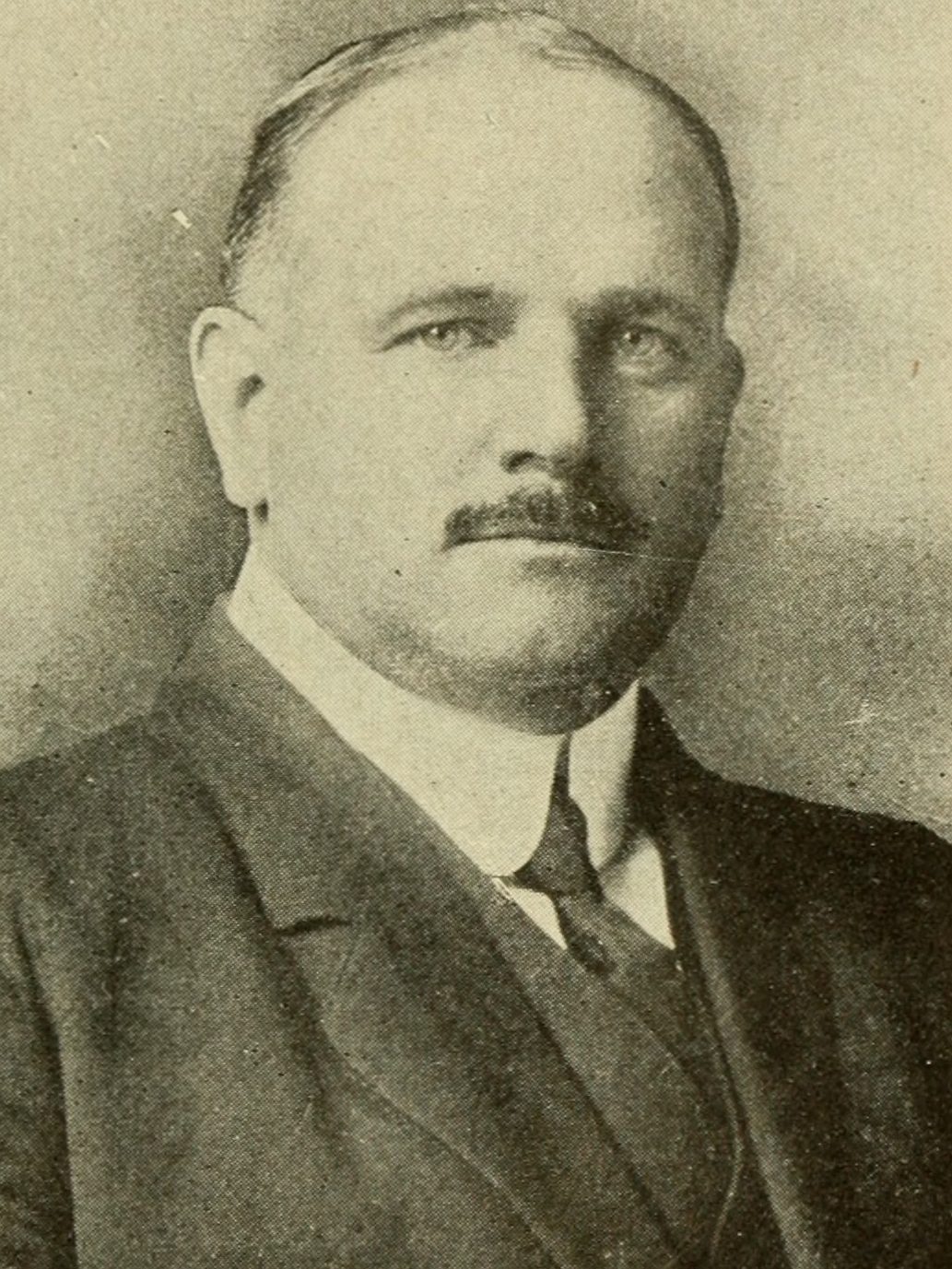
- Wilson circa 1918

Commissioner of the Boston Police Department
- In office 1922–1930
- Appointed by: Channing H. Cox
- Preceded by: Edwin Upton Curtis
- Succeeded by: Eugene Hultman

Boston Building Commissioner
- In office 1918–1922
- Appointed by: Andrew J. Peters

Member of the Massachusetts Senate
- In office 1917–1918

Member of the Massachusetts House of Representatives
- In office 1913–1916

Personal details
- Born: November 27, 1870 Brighton
- Died: May 7, 1934 (aged 63) Brighton
- Party: Republican

Herbert A. Wilson (November 27, 1870 – May 7, 1934) was an American politician who served as Commissioner of the Boston Police Department and member of the Massachusetts General Court (state legislature).

== Early life ==
Wilson was born on November 27, 1870, in Boston's Brighton neighborhood. He graduated from Brighton High School and studied civil engineering at the Massachusetts Institute of Technology. He spent many years as an assistant engineer for the city of Boston. In 1908 he began working at the office of John Cheney, a bridge builder. Wilson eventually started his own engineering business.

== State legislature ==
From 1913 to 1916, Wilson was a member of the Massachusetts House of Representatives. From 1917 to 1918 he represented the Norfolk and Suffolk District in the Massachusetts Senate.

== Municipal offices ==
On July 18, 1918, he was appointed by Boston Mayor Andrew James Peters to serve as the city's Building Commissioner. On April 3, 1922, Wilson was appointed by Governor Channing H. Cox to succeed the deceased Edwin Upton Curtis as Boston's police commissioner. He was reappointed by Governor Alvan T. Fuller in 1927. During his later years as commissioner, Wilson fought with Mayor James Michael Curley and District Attorney William J. Foley, who believed that there was a great deal of corruption in city government. In 1930, the head of BPD's liquor and vice raiding squad, Oliver Garrett, was convicted on conspiracy charges. Massachusetts Attorney General Joseph E. Warner found that Wilson had not taken part in any corruption, but faulted him for not discovering the corruption, negligence, and incompetency within his department and for awarding Garrett a fraudulent pension. Governor Frank G. Allen demanded Wilson's resignation, but he refused to quit. On May 5, 1930, the Massachusetts Governor's Council voted unanimously to remove Wilson "for the better protection of the public welfare".

== Later life ==
After his departure from the police department, Wilson resumed his engineering practice. He died on May 7, 1934, at his home in Brighton, Boston following several weeks of illness.

== See also ==
- 1915 Massachusetts legislature
- 1916 Massachusetts legislature
- 1917 Massachusetts legislature
- 1918 Massachusetts legislature
