= Josiah Quincy (1859–1919) =

American politician (1859–1919)

Josiah Quincy VI
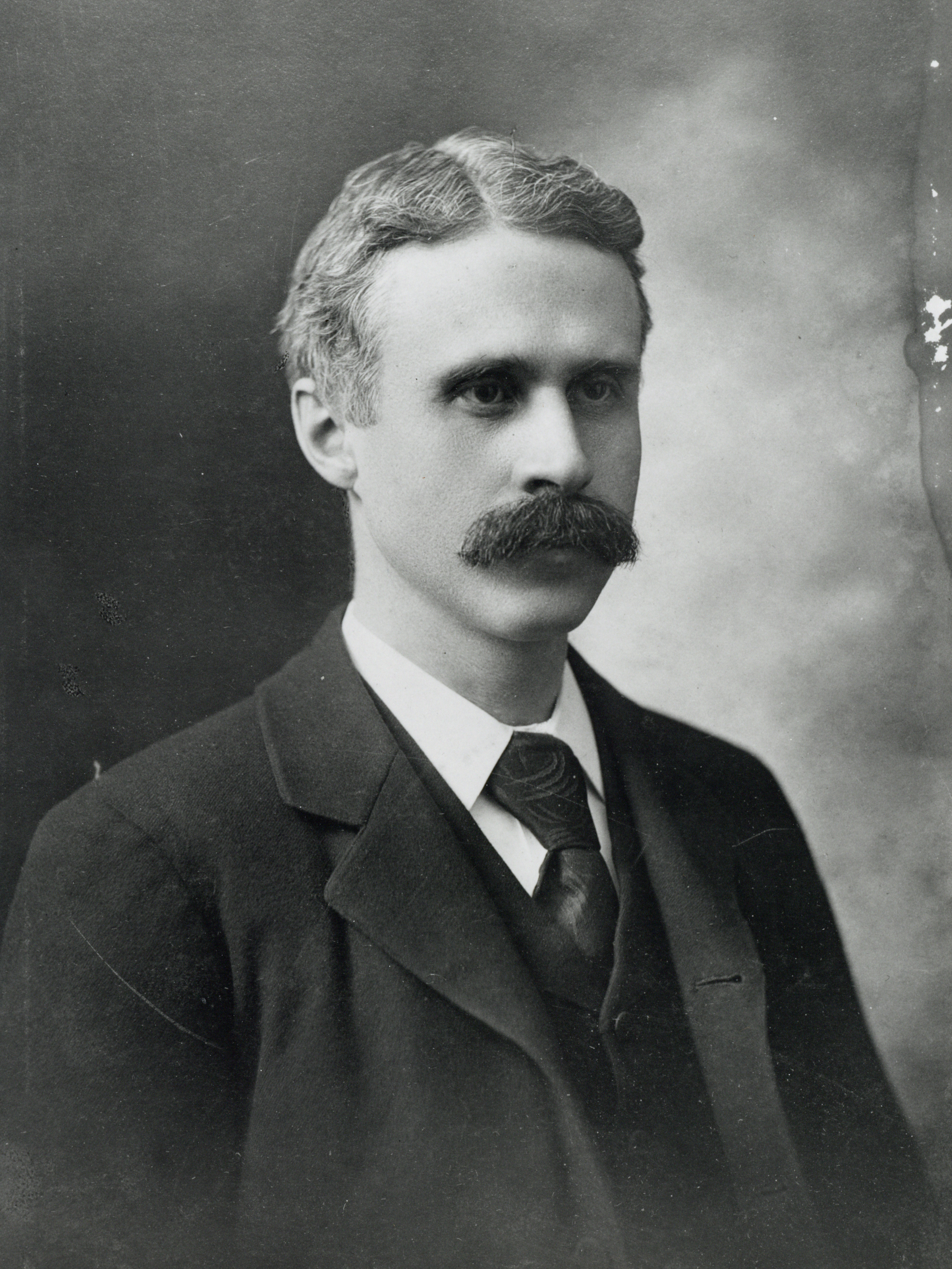

Mayor of Boston
- In office January 6, 1896 – January 1, 1900
- Preceded by: Edwin Upton Curtis
- Succeeded by: Thomas N. Hart

United States Assistant Secretary of State
- In office March 20, 1893 – September 22, 1893
- President: Grover Cleveland
- Preceded by: William F. Wharton
- Succeeded by: Edwin F. Uhl

Chairperson of the Massachusetts Democratic Party
- In office 1905–1906
- Preceded by: John Flaherty
- Succeeded by: John P. Feeney
- In office 1891–1894
- Preceded by: John W. Corcoran
- Succeeded by: John W. Corcoran

Personal details
- Born: October 15, 1859 Quincy, Massachusetts, U.S.
- Died: September 8, 1919 (aged 59) Boston, Massachusetts, U.S.
- Party: Democratic
- Spouse: Ellen Frances Tyler (m. 1900; died 1904) Mary D. Honey (m. 1905)
- Relations: Quincy family
- Children: 1
- Education: Harvard College
- Occupation: Politician; lawyer

Josiah Quincy VI (/ˈkwɪnzi/; October 15, 1859 – September 8, 1919) was an American politician from Massachusetts who served as mayor of Boston from 1896 to 1900. A member of the Quincy political family, his grandfather Josiah Quincy IV (also known as Josiah Quincy Jr.) and great-grandfather Josiah Quincy III also had served as mayors of Boston.

== Early life and education ==
Quincy was born in Quincy, Massachusetts, on October 15, 1859, the son of Josiah Phillips Quincy, and Helen Frances "Fanny" (Huntington) Quincy. Josiah Phillips Quincy was a Harvard graduate and was a lawyer and poet who also wrote several books related to politics. Josiah Quincy VI's grandfather and great-grandfather had both been mayors of Boston.

Quincy pursued a career in law and graduated from Harvard College in 1880, enrolled in Harvard Law School, and in 1884 was admitted to the Massachusetts Bar.

== Career ==
A life-long supporter of historical preservation and organizations, Quincy addressed the first meeting of the Bostonian Society inside the Old State House in 1882, wherein he advocated for the retelling and commemoration of American history as a relevant subject.

A Democrat, Quincy was a member of the Massachusetts House of Representatives from 1887 to 1888 and from 1890 to 1891.

Quincy was an unsuccessful candidate in the 2nd District of Massachusetts' congressional election in 1888 and served as the chairman of the Massachusetts Democratic Party from 1891 to 1894 and in 1905 to 1906. He was appointed as the United States Assistant Secretary of State by President Grover Cleveland in 1893 but resigned after six months. As Assistant Secretary of State, he filled all jobs under him with Bay Staters.

== Mayoralty ==
Quincy served two terms as mayor of Boston, being elected in December 1895, re-elected in December 1897, and holding office from January 1896 to January 1900.

Quincy appointed a board of advisors, made up of Boston's leading businessmen, to guide him in the matters of taxes, business, and finance. In 1899, he united the city's various railroad terminals by building the South Station union station, which cost the city $3.6 million. It soon became the busiest station in New England. He saw to it that many playgrounds, public baths, and gymnasia were created during his mayoralty.

He was contemporaneously both applauded and criticized for his "socialist" reforms.

== Personal life ==
Soon after leaving the mayoral office, on February 17, 1900, Quincy married Ellen Frances Krebs Tyler, a Christian Scientist, in London. She was the widow of William Royall Tyler (1852–1897) and mother of Royall Tyler, as well as the inheritor to a sizable shipbuilding fortune, which saw her receive $10,000 annually. They lived in Biarritz, France together and had one child, a son, named Edmund Quincy (1903–1997), who became a painter, author, and poet. Ellen died from cancer on February 16, 1904, one day short of their fourth anniversary.

Quincy remarried a year later, marrying Mary D. Honey (1873–1941), who later adopted Edmund as her son. She was the daughter of Samuel Robinson Honey (1842–1927), who was mayor of Newport, Rhode Island in 1892.

== Later life and death ==
Quincy was an unsuccessful candidate for governor of Massachusetts in 1901.

In 1906 Quincy served on the Boston Transit Commission.

Quincy was a delegate to the Massachusetts constitutional convention in 1917 and an unsuccessful candidate for Massachusetts attorney general in 1917. He was a member of the Massachusetts Society of Colonial Wars.

Quincy died in his home in Boston on September 8, 1919, at the age of 59.

== See also ==
- Timeline of Boston, 1890s

Party political offices
Preceded by Joseph Joyce Donahue	Democratic nominee for Attorney General of Massachusetts; 1917	Succeeded by Joseph L. P. St. Coeur
Political offices
Preceded by William F. Wharton	United States Assistant Secretary of State; March 20, 1893 – September 22, 1893	Succeeded by Edwin F. Uhl
Preceded by Edwin Curtis	Mayor of Boston, Massachusetts; 1896–1900	Succeeded by Thomas N. Hart
Party political offices
Preceded by Robert Treat Paine	Democratic nominee for Governor of Massachusetts; 1901	Succeeded by William A. Gaston
Preceded by John J. Flaherty	Chairman of the Massachusetts Democratic Party; 1905–1906	Succeeded by John P. Feeney
