= Stephen O'Meara =

Canadian-born American journalist and political figure (1854–1918)

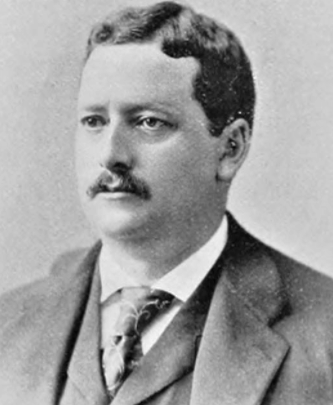
- O'Meara circa 1896

Commissioner of the Boston Police Department
- In office June 4, 1906 – December 14, 1918
- Preceded by: Position created
- Succeeded by: Edwin Upton Curtis

Personal details
- Born: July 26, 1854 Charlottetown, Prince Edward Island, British North America
- Died: December 14, 1918 (aged 64) Boston, Massachusetts, U.S.
- Party: Republican
- Spouse: Isabella M. Squire (m. 1878)
- Profession: Journalist; Police commissioner

Stephen O'Meara (1854–1918) was a Canadian-born American journalist and political figure who was the first commissioner of the Boston Police Department and editor of The Boston Journal.

== Early life ==
O'Meara was born in Charlottetown, Prince Edward Island on July 26, 1854. His family moved to a farm in Braintree, Massachusetts in 1864, but quickly left for Boston's Charlestown neighborhood. He graduated from Charlestown High School in 1872. On August 5, 1878, he married Isabella M. Squire. They had three daughters.

== Journalism ==
After high school, O'Meara worked for The Boston Globe as its Charlestown reporter. After three months he was promoted to the city staff. He joined the Boston Journal in 1874 as a legislative, political, and shorthand reporter. From 1879 to 1881 he was the paper's city editor. From 1881 to 1891 he served as managing editor.

On July 1, 1891, general manager W. W. Clapp retired from the paper and O'Meara was given control of both the commercial and editorial sides of the paper. Soon thereafter, O'Meara fell ill with severe acute Bright's disease. At one point he was pronounced dead. However, he eventually recovered and returned to the Journal.

On March 15, 1895, O'Meara resigned from the paper and was replaced by Francis M. Stanwood. On January 1, 1896, a syndicate led by W. D. Sohler purchased 80% of the paper and O'Meara returned as editor-in-chief, publisher, and part owner. In 1899 he purchased majority ownership in the paper. In October 1902, O'Meara sold the paper to Frank Munsey and retired from publishing.

== Political career ==
On September 7, 1904, O'Meara declared his candidacy for the United States House of Representatives seat in Massachusetts's 11th congressional district. He lost the Republican nomination to Eugene Foss 2,993 votes to 2,271.

Republicans considered nominating O'Meara in the 1905 Boston mayoral election, but he had no interest in running. On July 20 he and his family left the city for a year long vacation in Europe, where his children were to attend school.

In 1910, O'Meara again ran for Congress in the 11th District. He ran as a progressive and opposed Republican Speaker of the House Joseph Cannon. He lost the Republican nomination to conservative W. Dudley Cotton Jr. 3,091 votes to 2,146. Cotton had run an energetic campaign while O'Meara elected to not campaign at all.

== Police commissioner ==
In 1906, a new law went into effect which replaced the three-member Boston police commission with a single police commissioner. On May 23, 1906, Governor Curtis Guild Jr. cabled O'Meara, who staying in Dresden, informing him that he had been nominated for the position of police commissioner and asking him to return to the city at once. He departed from Liverpool on the SS Arabic on May 25. He arrived in Boston on June 2, 1906 and took office on June 4.

After taking office, O'Meara instituted a number of reforms. During his first year, O'Meara barred officers from accepting rewards for routine action, replaced the disciplinary action of fining police officers with extra work assignments, forbid city hall officials from interfering with police business, eliminated bathhouse details, opposed veteran's preference for appointment to the police department, and issued new orders regarding his officers' use of firearms, arrest of juveniles, physical appearance. In 1915 he ordered that police officers no longer regulate dancing at hotels and other places that sold liquor.

O'Meara's appointment expired in 1911. His reappointment was opposed by a group of 150 Boston ministers, led by Willard Francis Mallalieu, as well as a group of South End women, who wanted public education activist Florence Page appointed to the position over the "weak and inefficient" O'Meara. His reappointment was endorsed by the Good Government Association as well as another group of Protestant clergy, which included Thomas Van Ness, Herbert S. Johnson, and Adolf A. Berle Sr. On May 31, Governor Foss reappointed O'Meara. He remained commissioner until his death on December 14, 1918.
