= Martha Gallison Moore Avery =

Catholic labor leader and former socialist

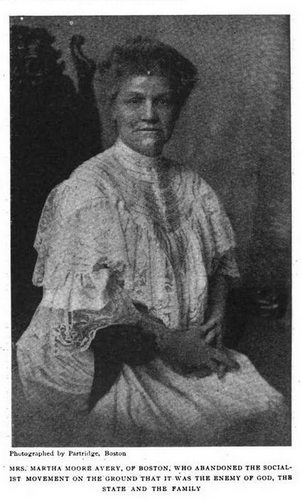
Martha Moore Avery, from a 1908 publication.

Martha Gallison Moore-Avery (April 6, 1851 – August 8, 1929) was an American socialist who later converted to Catholicism and became an anti-Socialism activist. After her conversion, she became the founder of the Catholic labor organization Common Cause Society and of the Catholic Truth Guild, which became the most extensive lay apostolate of the Catholic Church in America.

== Early years ==
Avery was born in Steuben, Maine, in 1851, one of eight children of Albion King Paris Moore and Katherine Leighton Moore. After the death of her mother when she was 13, she moved to live with her grandfather, Samuel Moore, who was a member of the Maine Senate. Later, in Ellsworth, Maine, she started a millinery business and became actively involved in religious life, joining the local Unitarian church. In 1880, she married another member of her church, Millard Fillmore Avery, and shortly later moved to Boston, Massachusetts.

== Boston and socialism ==
Boston exposed her to a much wider range of religious and social thought. There she studied metaphysics with Charles D. Sherman, an astrologer and student of Eastern thought. She also joined the Nationalist Club, a local society created to promote the ideas of socialist utopian author Edward Bellamy. Her involvement with socialism increased. A year after the death of her husband in 1890, she joined the Socialist Labor Party of America, and remained a leader in local socialist politics for a number of years. In 1896, she founded the Karl Marx Class, which would later be renamed the Boston School of Political Economy.

== Disenchantment with socialism ==
During this period she became acquainted with David Goldstein. In response to the extremist activities and teachings of the Christian socialist George D. Herron, they gradually became disenchanted with what they saw as the irreligious and immoral implications of a socialist society until, in 1902, they proposed a motion at the Massachusetts socialist convention to formally repudiate any socialists who attacked religion or advocated violence or free love. After the defeat of their motion by the convention, they withdrew from the socialist party and became fervent anti-socialists, jointly publishing a book, Socialism: The Nation of Fatherless Children, in 1903. In this book Avery argued that socialism would inevitably lead to a situation where every child was an orphan under the control of the State. The book uses the example of Karl Marx's daughter Eleanor and how her "socialist marriage" led to unhappiness and suicide.

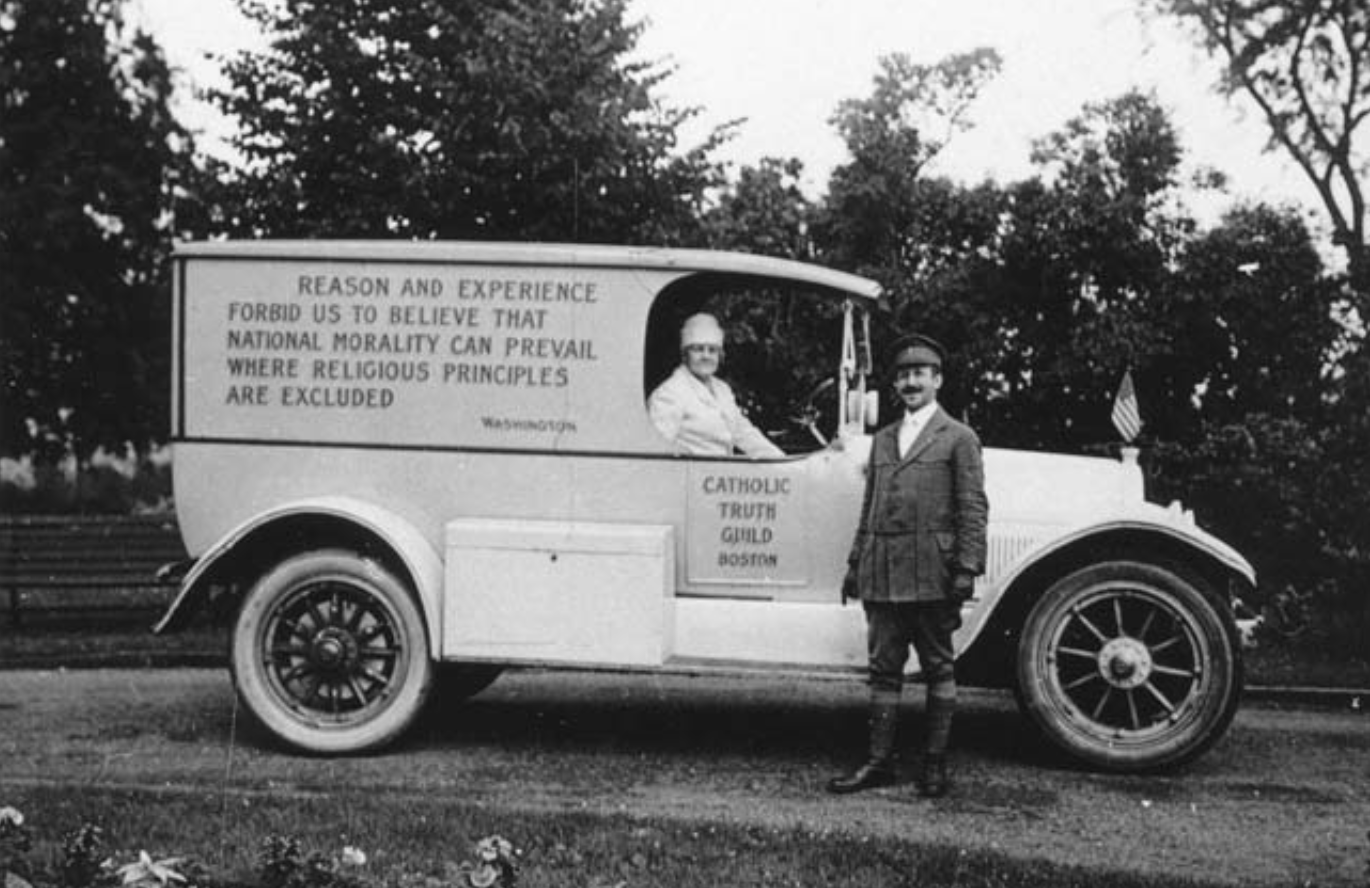
Avery and Goldstein campaigning for the Catholic Truth Guild

== Roman Catholicism ==
During this time, she found herself developing a growing interest in Roman Catholicism. She sent her daughter to a local Catholic school because of her high regard for such schools. Her daughter would convert to Catholicism and eventually become a nun. Later, on May 1, International Workers' Day, Avery herself converted to Roman Catholicism.

She continued to be a staunch advocate for industrial workers rights. However, she now based her ideas on those put forward in Pope Leo XIII's encyclical Rerum novarum. She was a proponent for the organization of labor unions, strike action, and collective bargaining, and was intensely involved in the new Catholic social justice movement. In 1922, she became the president of the Common Cause Society, a Catholic labor organization, and would remain in that position for the rest of her life, in the process becoming one of the major proponents of a public welfare state in the US, as she felt that otherwise laissez-faire capitalism would destroy the family just as effectively as Marxism. She also wrote a book criticizing the Bolshevik Revolution and the Soviet Union titled Bolshevism: Its Cure in 1919.

She also came to believe that it was important for her to evangelize for the Roman Catholic Church. In 1916, with her friend David Goldstein, she founded the Catholic Truth Guild, which over the years became the largest lay apostolate in the history of the Roman Catholic Church in the United States. They published the book Cam

Avery was a passionate anti-suffragette, arguing that female voting could destroy family coherence. In 1913 she was made an honorary vice president of the anti-suffrage Guidon Club. In 1912 she made a speaking tour of Ohio on behalf of the Ohio Association Opposed to Woman's Suffrage; in 1915 she made a speaking tour of Massachusetts sponsored by the Massachusetts Anti-Suffrage Committee.

She continued to serve as a staunch advocate of labor reform and Catholicism until her death in 1929 of arteriosclerosis.
