= David Goldstein (Catholic apologist) =

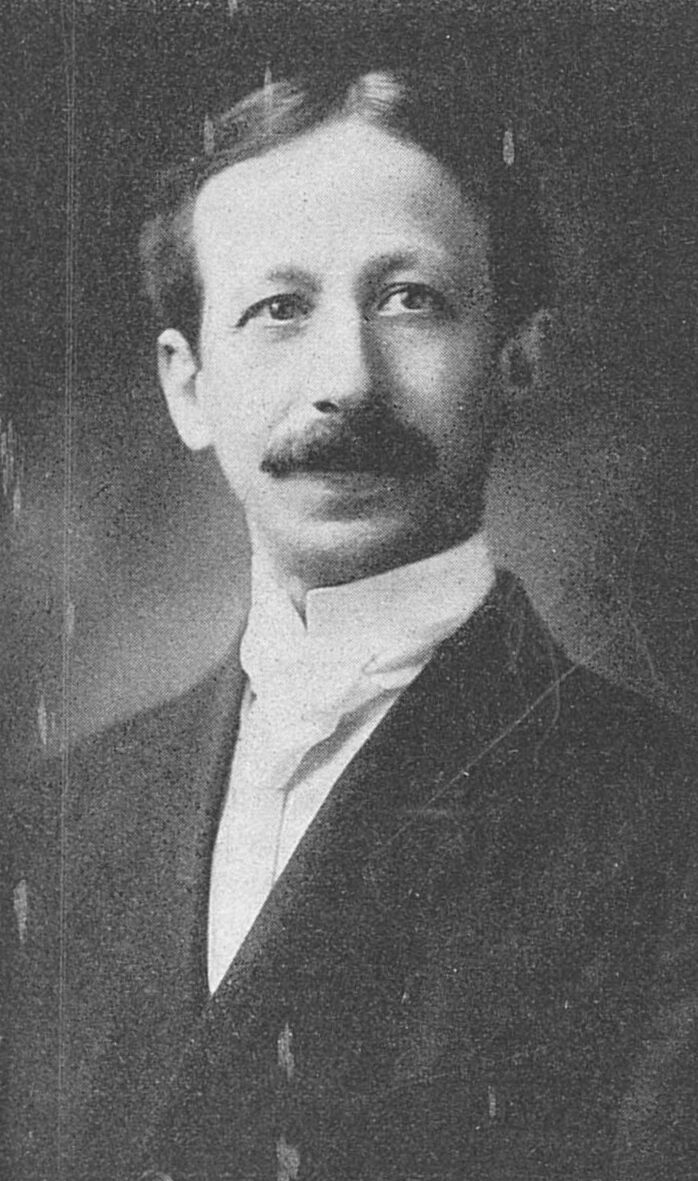
David Goldstein, circa 1918

David Goldstein (July 27, 1870 in London, England – June 30, 1958 in Boston) was an American Christian apologist who had converted from Judaism to the Roman Catholic Church and founded the Catholic Campaigners for Christ in the early 1900s. Goldstein was also a former organizer for the Socialist Labor Party of America who later became disenchanted with Marxism and worked against the spread of Socialism in the United States.

== Early life ==
Writing in 1936, David Goldstein recalled,

I was born in London, England, on July 27, 1870, of Netherlands Jewish parents who were married in London. I was just a little over a year old when, in 1871, my parents came to America to live in New York City. From thence—in 1888—on to Boston they moved, there to live until they went to their eternal reward within the past ten years... Poverty was the lot of my father and mother. This they struggled through with courage, with devoted love for each other and the children. My parents and their four children had to be supported on the meagre earnings my father obtained from long hours of toil at the bench, making cigars. Though born of strictly Orthodox Jewish parents, they like most Jews who attend the synagogue were Rosh Hashanah and Yom Kippur Jews. Thus, my father and mother, during my boyhood days, attended synagogue services on those two leading Jewish holidays, "if only for the children's sake," as Jewish fathers and mothers often say.

== Socialist ==
Goldstein quit school at eleven years, and began to work as a tobacco stripper. His real education began here, from his fellow-workers, to people such as Samuel Gompers and Henry George, who the young Goldstein supported in his run for Mayor of New York City in 1886. Gompers would remain an influence throughout his life.

In 1888, Goldstein's family moved to Boston, Massachusetts, where, inspired by Edward Bellamy's Looking Backward, he decided to work in organized labor. At his union local, Goldstein first encountered Marxism, which attracted him greatly. In 1895, Goldstein's parents were horrified when he joined the Socialist Labor Party of America. However, his talents as an organizer soon placed him on the front page of Boston's newspapers and his parents took great pride in him for this reason. Goldstein was an unsuccessful candidate for Mayor of Boston in the December 1897 election, finishing with 1% of the vote.

While a Socialist, Goldstein also met Martha Gallison Moore Avery, who had also been influenced by Bellamy and who became Goldstein's lifelong friend and mentor. In 1899, Goldstein became the Secretary of the Boston School of Political Economy, an institution founded by Avery.

== Disenchantment with socialism ==
In response to the activities of the Christian Socialist George D. Herron, Goldstein gradually became disenchanted with what he saw as the irreligious and immoral implications of a Marxist society. Despite his attachment to Socialism, Goldstein had always believed quite strongly in family values. Therefore, when Rev. Herron abandoned his wife and children for another woman and began preaching free love, Goldstein became one of the defrocked clergyman's most vocal critics.

However, the rank and file of the Socialist movement applauded Herron's teachings, much to Goldstein's disgust and horror. In 1902, Goldstein, Avery, and a small number of allies proposed a motion at the Massachusetts Socialist convention to formally repudiate any socialists who attacked religion, advocated violence or free love. After the contemptuous defeat of the motion, Goldstein refused to accept defeat and continued campaigning for the same cause. However, he was becoming increasingly a voice in the wilderness.

In 1902, the translation of Karl Marx's critique of family and marriage left Goldstein in no doubt about the real aims of the ideology he had served. As a result, he and his allies resigned from the Socialist movement and became a fervent anti-Marxist. With Martha Moore Avery, Goldstein published a book, Socialism: The Nation of Fatherless Children, in 1903.

At first, the Socialist press treated the work to a full scale media blackout. However, when it was favorably quoted by Theodore Roosevelt and senior officials of the American Federation of Labor, the book became a major bestseller. As a result, Goldstein and Avery were repeatedly smeared by the Socialist press and compared to Judas Iscariot. If anything, this only strengthened their decision to defend their country against what they saw as a totalitarian ideology.

Soon after, they both decided to convert to Catholicism; she in 1904 and he in 1905. Both became involved with Fr. Peter Dietz' Militia of Christ, a movement to inoculate Catholic workers against the inroads of socialism and communism into the union movement. Goldstein began using the Boston School of Political Economy to publicize his opposition to socialism and communism. As a socialist and a Jew who had converted to Catholicism, Goldstein quickly became a sensation in Catholic circles, and rose to become a prominent lecturer around the United States for the Militia of Christ.

Goldstein also became deeply involved in evangelizing the Jews, authoring several prominent books and tracts designed to be used by Christian apologists working with Jews. He founded the Catholic Truth Guild in 1917 along with Martha Moore Avery. In 1936 he founded the Catholic Campaigners for Christ. He dedicated his 1934 book, Campaigners for Christ, to the Knights of Columbus, supporters of his work.

== Quote ==
- "It took some time to understand -- being sympathetic with Socialism -- that Socialists succeed in making 'Socialist minds' mainly by constantly picturing the misery of the poor and the greed of the rich; by continually condemning all things which meet with dissatisfaction in the minds of toilers, whether the discontent be rational or ridiculous; by increasing disapproval or condemnation of the character, work or proposals of officials in trade unions who have to meet practical issues and the responsibilities of the conflicts of labor organizations. At the same time, Socialists press forward their abstract propositions attract those idealists whose pictures are ephemeral and fall into confusion, like a baby's house made of blocks, when the common sense touch of the actual world of strife and strain is applied to them; for human nature is what it is and not what Socialist idealists conjure it up to be in their sickly sentimental thoughts."

== Writings ==
- Suicide Bent: Sangerizing Mankind. St. Paul: Radio Replies Press, 1945.
- Jewish Panorama. Boston: Catholic Campaigners for Christ, 1940.
- Letters, Hebrew-Catholic, to Mr. Isaacs. St. Paul: Radio Replies Press, 1943.
- What Say You? St. Paul: Radio Replies Press, 1945.
- Socialism: The Nation of Fatherless Children. (With Martha Moore Avery). Boston School of Political Economy, 1903.
- Bolshevism: its Cure, Boston School of Political Economy, 1919.
- The Autobiography of a Campaigner for Christ, Boston, Catholic Campaigners for Christ, 1936.
