= Frank Parsons (social reformer) =

Father of Vocational Guidance

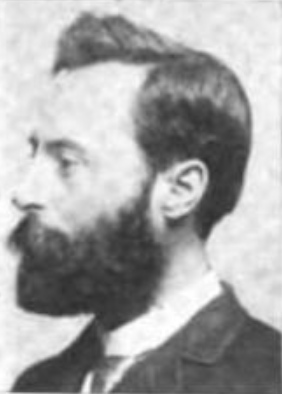
- Born: November 14, 1854; Mount Holly, New Jersey
- Died: September 26, 1908 (aged 53); Boston, Massachusetts
- Education: Cornell University
- Occupation: Academic

Frank Parsons (November 14, 1854 – September 26, 1908) was an American professor, social reformer, and public intellectual. Although he was educated as an engineer at Cornell University, he passed the Massachusetts state bar examination and became a lawyer in 1881. Parsons was a lecturer at Boston University School of Law for more than a decade and taught at Kansas State Agricultural College from 1897 to 1899. As a leading social commentator of the Progressive Era, Parsons authored a dozen books and more than 125 magazine and journal articles on a wide range of reform topics, including currency reform, regulation of monopolies, municipal ownership, establishment of direct democracy, and other matters. Parsons is also widely regarded as the father of the vocational guidance movement.

== Biography ==
=== Early years ===
Frank Parsons was born on November 14, 1854, in Mount Holly, New Jersey, the son of an Anglo-Saxon family with American antecedents dating back to the time of the American Revolution. The family was highly intellectual in proclivity, with a number of physicians, lawyers, and teachers dotting the family tree, particularly on Frank's mother's side.

Intellectually talented from an early age, Frank was enrolled in Cornell University at the age of 15 and graduated after just three years with a Bachelor's degree in civil engineering.

=== Career ===
Parsons took a job as a civil engineer for a railroad located in Western Massachusetts upon graduation but he lost this position when the firm collapsed amidst the Panic of 1873.

After relatively brief stints as a common laborer and a public school teacher, Parsons decided to go into the legal profession, preparing for the Massachusetts bar examination for one year before taking and passing the exam in 1881.

Unfortunately, Parsons experienced a health failure shortly after passing the bar exam and found himself compelled to move to the New Mexico Territory in search of recovery. Parsons remained there for three years. Parsons established a legal practice in New Mexico but soon tired of the profession. Instead, Parsons was employed by the publishing firm of Little, Brown and Company as a writer of law textbooks. Several volumes were produced during the course of this association.

With textbook publications came academic recognition, and in 1892 Parsons was added to the staff as a lecturer at Boston University School of Law. He held that position for the greater part of the rest of his life, leaving only in 1905 on account of competing research interests.

Parson's position at Boston University only occupied part of the academic year, leaving him free to work on other projects and in other capacities for much of the year. He joined the staff of Kansas State Agricultural College in 1897, in the wake of a Populist electoral victory in that state and the advent of a new liberal administration at the college.

=== Social reformer ===
Parsons became interested in the ideas of economic rationalization during the Progressive Era of the 1890s. It was a time of great disparity between wealthy plutocrats, often exercising monopoly power over the economy through organized associations called trusts, and a frequently impoverished working class, racked by periodic financial panics and depressions, such as the 1873 event which had cost Parsons his first job.

With his characteristic energy, Parsons threw himself into the systematic study of many of the topics espoused by muckraking journalists and intellectuals of the day. He produced several influential books, including tomes on monetary reform (Rational Money, 1898), market dysfunction in the communications industry (The Telegraph Monopoly, 1899), public ownership of monopoly industries (The City for the People, 1899), substitution of democracy for oligarchy (Direct Legislation, 1900), and the abuses of the railroad industry (The Trusts, the Railroads, and the People, 1906). He created a new "ism" Mutualism, a co-operative commonwealth based on a mixed economy in which government owned and managed public utilities would operate alongside cooperative manufacturing and agricultural businesses owned by the workers, as presented in his 1894 book Our Country's Need.

In December 1895, Parsons ran for Mayor of Boston, as the candidate for the Municipal Reform Party—"a fusion of prohibitionists, labor, populists, and socialists". He finished last in a field of three, with 0.8% of the vote.

In addition to his steady stream of books and pamphlets, Parsons wrote extensively for the periodical press, contributing more than 125 articles to B.O. Flower's progressive monthly, The Arena and other publications. In addition to his prolific work for The Arena, Parsons was named a contributing editor to the social democratic monthly The American Fabian in 1896.

In addition to his writing activities, Parsons was a prominent public speaker, serving as a lecturer for the National Direct Legislation League, as head of the lecture department of the Social Reform Union, and as president of the National League for Promoting Public Ownership of Monopolies. In the course of his life, Parsons was recognized as a national expert on public ownership of utilities. In 1906, he was commissioned by the National Civic Federation to travel to Great Britain to study the incidence of municipal ownership and its outcomes in that country.

In 1907, he submitted plans for a Vocation Bureau which would be open not only to the members of the Civic Service House where he volunteered, but to all who wished to come for help in their life-work problems.

Parsons also served as dean of the extension division of Ruskin College in Trenton, Missouri.

=== Death and legacy ===
Frank Parsons died September 26, 1908, in Boston, Massachusetts. He was 53 years old at the time of his death.

A memorial service in Parsons' honor was held October 25, 1908, at the People's Church in Washington, D.C. In the eulogy by Rev. Alexander Kent, Parson's was remembered as a consistent analyst striving to advance the general weal:

There were few men whose ability was so completely devoted to the public good.... The problem of human betterment was always uppermost in his thought. He was continually at work tracing the evils from which men suffer to their source, and showing how they might be avoided or at least greatly lessened. He was a consistent opponent of that individualism which pits men against each other in the struggle for existence, and an earnest advocate of that individuality that fits men for useful membership in the social body, and so draws them together in mutual fellowship and service.

Parsons' papers are housed at Yale University Library in New Haven, Connecticut.

The posthumous publication in 1911 of Parson's manuscript, Choosing a Vocation, and its so-called "talent-matching approach" proved to be massively influential with a generation of educationalists. Parson's book remains regarded as a classic in the field and Parsons is still in the 21st Century remembered as "the founder of the vocational guidance movement."

== Works ==
- The World's Best Books. Boston: Little, Brown and Co., 1889.
- The Philosophy of Mutualism. Philadelphia: Bureau of Nationalist Literature, n.d. (c. 1894).
- Public Ownership of Monopolies (c.1894)
- The Wanamaker Conference; or, John Wanamaker and the Nationalist. Philadelphia: Frederick A. Bisbee, n.d. (c. 1895).
- Rational Money: A National Currency Intelligently Regulated in Reference to the Multiple Standard. Philadelphia: C.F. Taylor, 1898.
- The Drift of Our Time. Chicago: Charles H. Kerr & Co., December 1899.
- The Telegraph Monopoly. Philadelphia: C.F. Taylor, 1899.
- Direct Legislation; or, The Veto Power in the Hands of the People. Philadelphia: C.F. Taylor, Jan. 1900.
- The City for the People; or, The Municipalization of the City Government and of Local Franchises. Philadelphia: C.F. Taylor, 1900.
- The Story of New Zealand: A History of New Zealand from the Earliest Times to the Present, with Special Reference to the Political, Industrial and Social Development of the Island Commonwealth... Philadelphia: C.F. Taylor, 1904.
- The Railways, the Trusts, and the People. Philadelphia: C.F. Taylor, 1905.
- The Heart of the Railroad Problem: The History of Railway Discrimination in the United States, the Chief Efforts at Control and the Remedies Proposed with Hints from Other Countries. Boston: Little, Brown and Co., 1906.
- Choosing a Vocation. Boston: Houghton Mifflin Co., 1909. —Posthumously published.
- Legal Doctrine and Social Progress. New York: B.W. Huebsch, 1911. —Posthumously published.

== See also ==
- Career development
- School counselor
