= Joseph Garland =

Joseph Garland may refer to:

- Joe Garland (1903–1977), American jazz saxophonist, composer and arranger
- Joseph Garland (mayor) (1830–1914), American doctor and mayor of Gloucester, Massachusetts
- Joseph E. Garland, American historian and journalist
- Joseph Garland (pediatrician) (1893–1973), American pediatrician and editor-in-chief of The New England Journal of Medicine

== See also ==
- George Joseph Garland (1856–1950), member of the New Zealand Legislative Council
