= George Garland =

George Garland may refer to:

- George Garland (MP) (1753–1825), English politician and merchant
- George Garland (New Zealand politician) (1856–1950), member of the New Zealand Legislative Council
- George Garland Jr. (1793–1833), Newfoundland merchant and magistrate
- George Garland (photographer) (1900–1978), English photographer
