= Johnny Buckley (boxing manager) =

American boxing manager and promoter (1889–1963)

- Born: May 22, 1889; Somerville, Massachusetts, U.S.
- Died: August 6, 1963 (aged 74); Boston, Massachusetts, U.S.
- Occupations: Boxing promoter, manager, matchmaker

Johnny Buckley (May 22, 1889 – August 6, 1963) was a boxing manager and promoter from Boston, Massachusetts who was active mostly during the first half of the 20th century. He handled a number of notable boxers and guided Jack Sharkey and Paul Pender to world boxing titles.

== Early life ==
Buckley was born on May 22, 1889 in Somerville, Massachusetts. He was the oldest of fourteen children and left school at the age of fifteen to help support his family after the death of his father.

== Career ==
=== Early career ===
Buckley's early boxers included his brother-in-law Johnny Lynch, Matty Baldwin, Dave Deshler, and Jimmy Walsh. By 1927, he had a stable of twenty boxers. In 1929, he was suspended by the Rhode Island Athletic Commission for "unethical conduct" after he took exception to a decision against one of his boxers, Andy Martin.

=== Jack Sharkey ===
Buckley (center, standing) with Sharkey (center sitting) and others in February 1929

Jack Sharkey joined with Buckley shortly after Sharkey's discharge from the United States Navy. Buckley handled Sharkey's management and training, while Jack Conway, a Boston newspaper reporter, handled his business affairs. Sharkey was Buckley's first heavyweight fighter.

Buckley managed Sharkey to victories over Jack Renault, Jim Maloney, Johnny Risko, George Godfrey, and Harry Wills. On June 21, 1932, at the Madison Square Garden Bowl in Long Island City, New York, Sharkey defeated Max Schmeling to win the undisputed world heavyweight champion. Sharkey lost the title on June 29, 1933 to Primo Carnera.

=== Andy Callahan ===
Buckley's favorite fighter was middleweight Andy Callahan. In 1930, Buckley was suspended by the Rhode Island Athletic Commission for violently protesting a decision against Callahan. On December 8, 1933, Callahan lost a decision to world middleweight champion Vince Dundee. After the fight, Buckley contended that Callahan should have been declared the winner and accused the clerk of the Massachusetts Boxing Commission of falsifying Callahan's weight. Buckley's statements led to him receiving a six-month suspension in Massachusetts.

=== Ernie Schaaf ===
In 1930, Ernie Schaaf left Phil Schlossberg and signed with Buckley. Buckley and Sharkey were in Schaaf's corner on February 10, 1933, when he was knocked out by Primo Carnera. Schaaf died four days later from injuries he sustained in the fight.

=== Lou Brouillard ===
In 1934, Buckley purchased the contract of former world welterweight and middleweight champion Lou Brouillard from Maurice Lemoine for $4,000. In 1937, the International Boxing Union gave Brouillard a year's suspension and banned Buckley for life following Brouillard's disqualification in his fight against Marcel Thil.

=== Fight promotion ===
In 1934, Buckley, Dick Dunn, and Homer Rainault formed a fight syndicate known as the Sharkey Athletic Association. The organization promoted fights at Boston's Mechanics Hall. Dunn hired Jessie Costello, who was acquitted of the murder of her husband at a highly publicized trial, to be the club's general treasurer. The Sharkey A.A. also hosted a weekly boxing tournament at the Ritz Plaza ballroom. In 1955, the licence of the Sharkey A.A., as well as the matchmaking permits of Buckley and his son, John Jr., were suspended after an investigation found that the club had advertised Ted Murray and Tommy Nee on a card despite knowing well in advance that they would not be able to appear.

In 1959, Buckley began co-promoting fights with Sam Silverman. Buckley was forced to give up fight promotion because the Massachusetts Athletic Commission did not allow managers to promote fights.

=== Paul Pender ===
Buckley managed Paul Pender for eleven years. He was Pender's manager when he beat Sugar Ray Robinson twice by decision in 1960, the first earning him the Middleweight Championship of the world. Pender fired Buckley in February 1961.

== Legal issues ==
On August 22, 1919, Buckley was convicted on gambling charges and sentenced to four and a half years in the Charlestown State Prison.

In 1930, Buckley reached an out-of-court settlement with Worcester, Massachusetts musician Charles Parker (also known as Charles Peskin) for injuries Parker sustained after Buckley struck him with his automobile.

On October 22, 1944, he was convicted of receiving stolen goods. In 1953, he was convicted of using his place of business to register bets and was put on probation.

In 1961, Buckley was arrested by the New York Police Department after he allegedly assaulted his son-in-law at the Hotel Edison.

== Death ==
Buckley died on August 6, 1963, in St. Elizabeth's Hospital. He was 74 years old.
