= John S. Parsons =

American politician

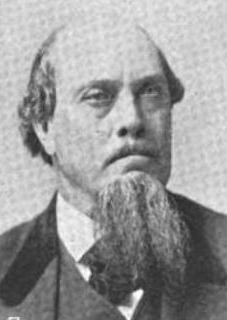

Mayor of Gloucester, Massachusetts
- In office 1885–1887
- Preceded by: William H. Wonson III
- Succeeded by: David I. Robinson

Gloucester City Marshal
- In office 1896–1897
- Preceded by: Sydney S. Sylvester
- Succeeded by: John Karcher

Keeper of the Gloucester Almshouse
- In office 1898–1905
- Preceded by: Daniel B. Tarr, Jr.
- Succeeded by: William E. McDonald

Personal details
- Born: 1836 Gloucester, Massachusetts
- Died: November 15, 1911 (aged 75) Gloucester, Massachusetts
- Children: 3 sons (Lemuel, Herman, and Henry), 2 daughters
- Occupation: House mover

John S. Parsons (1836–1911) was an American politician who served as Mayor of Gloucester, Massachusetts.

== Early life and business career ==
Parsons was born in 1836 in Gloucester. He received little formal education. Parsons attempted to become a fisherman, but was unable to because of Seasickness. Instead he started a house moving business. His son, Henry H. Parsons joined him and eventually took over the business. In their nearly fifty combined years as house movers, the Parsons had a virtual monopoly on house moving in Gloucester.

== Political career ==
=== Common Council and Board of Aldermen ===
In 1878, Parsons was elected to the Gloucester Common Council as a member of the Greenback Party. He was defeated for reelection the following year. In 1881, Parsons was elected to the city's Board of Aldermen. He was reelected in 1882 and 1883.

=== Mayor ===
In 1884, Parsons ran for mayor on the "Citizen's Ticket". He ran on a platform of ridding the city of its moral ills, including prostitution and illegal drinking. He defeated Democrat Charles C. Cressy and Republican Henry A. Parmenter in an upset.

After taking office, Parsons began his campaign of moral reform. He clashed with City Marshal Joseph A. Moore, whom Parsons did not believe was doing an adequate job enforcing the law. Once, while Moore was busy in court, Parsons took charge of the city's police force and launched several raids against Gloucester's brothels, which resulted in sixty arrests. In April 1885, Moore resigned and, after several of Parsons' nominees were rejected, he was succeeded by Robert Tarr. After taking office, Tarr began a crackdown on illegal liquor sales. He secured convictions, however some of his seizures were deemed to be illegal. By July, Parsons found Tarr to be too lenient and asked him to resign. Tarr refused. That September, Parsons, without Tarr's knowledge, hired two detectives to investigate vice. However, Parsons' detectives were found to be unreliable, as they did not show up for court.

In December 1885, Parsons was reelected. Once again running on the Citizen's ticket, he received 1,117 votes to Democrat Frank H. Gaffney's 806 and Republican Fitz J. Babson's 584. Soon after Parsons' reelection, Tarr resigned as City Marshall and Parsons took control of the police in the interim. After several of Parsons' nominees were rejected, George Douglass was confirmed as City Marshal. Douglass continued Parsons crusade against prostitution and liquor sales.

Parsons did not run for reelection in 1886. He was succeeded by David I. Robinson, who, like Parsons, was a supporter of the Temperance movement.

=== Later political activity ===
In 1887, Parsons ran for mayor again. He received 203 votes to David I. Robinson's 1,200 and Daniel D. Saunders 1,196. He sought the office in 1890 as well and finished third with 242 votes to Republican Asa G. Andrews' 1,457 and Democrat Joseph C. Shepherd's 872. In 1896 he ran as an Independent for the 11th Essex District seat in the Massachusetts House of Representatives, which consisted of Rockport and Ward 2 of Gloucester. He lost to Republican George M. McClain 582 votes to 241.

== City Marshal ==
In January 1896, Parsons was appointed City Marshal by Mayor David I. Robinson. He took office on January 18, 1896. Soon thereafter he issued an order prohibiting the sale of cigarettes to minors. He also ordered his officers to arrest any person who appeared to be intoxicated and not to assist anyone under the influence of alcohol in getting home. During his tenure as City Marshall, Parsons clashed with the Clerk of the Gloucester Police Court, Charles D. Smith, over the issuance of warrants.

In March 1897, Robinson's successor Benjamin F. Cook, attempted to remove Parsons from office. Parsons refused to resign and the Board of Aldermen remained supportive of him, rejecting Cook's numerous nominees for the office. On April 23, 1897, a number of Cook's nominees were rejected as a result of a tie vote. After one of the alderman who had opposed Cook's nominees had boarded a street car for home, the pro-Cook aldermen met with the Mayor and had him call an emergency meeting. The board then voted four to three to appoint John Karcher City Marshal. He was sworn in the following morning.

== Almshouse keeper ==
In 1898, Parsons was appointed keeper of Gloucester's almshouse. Following the death of an inmate of the almshouse in December 1903, an investigation was launched into its conditions. Parsons was accused of negligent care, wasting supplies, serving food that had gone bad or was poorly cooked, and abusing inmates. Further, allegations of disorderly conduct were made against Parsons' wife, who served as matron of the house, and improper sexual relationships were said to have existed between inmates and members of Parsons' family. The investigation was eventually dropped, however, in 1905, the new mayor, George E. MacDonald, replaced Parsons with his brother, William E. McDonald.

== Later life and death ==
In 1907, Parsons' son Henry was elected mayor of Gloucester. He later served in the Massachusetts House of Representatives.

Parsons died on November 15, 1911, in Gloucester.
