= Newdick =

Newdick is a surname. Notable people with the surname include:

- Brent Newdick (born 1985), New Zealand decathlete
- Graham Newdick (1949–2020), New Zealand cricketer
- Jonathan Newdick (born 1948), English artist and writer
- Ross Newdick (1936/1937–2005), New Zealand golfer

== See also ==
- Newdicks Beach, New Zealand
