= William H. Wonson III =

American politician (1826–1897

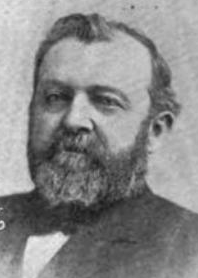

Mayor of Gloucester, Massachusetts
- In office 1883–1885
- Preceded by: William Williams
- Succeeded by: John S. Parsons

Personal details
- Born: June 22, 1826 Gloucester, Massachusetts, U.S.
- Died: June 1, 1897 (aged 70) Hamilton, Massachusetts, U.S.
- Party: Republican

William H. Wonson III (June 22, 1826 – June 1, 1897) was an American politician who was mayor of Gloucester, Massachusetts from 1883 to 1885.

== Biography ==
Wonson was born on June 22, 1826. In Gloucester's first city election on December 1, 1873, Wonson was elected to represent Ward 1 on the board of aldermen without opposition. He was reelected in 1874. In 1881 and 1882, he represented Gloucester in the Massachusetts House of Representatives. He ran for mayor in 1882 and defeated former mayor Robert R. Fears 1,073 votes to 992. He was reelected in a four-way contest over David I. Robinson, Daniel D. Saunders, and William Williams. He did not run for a third term. He died in 1897 in Asbury Grove, where he had a summer residence.
