= Joseph Garland (pediatrician) =

American pediatrician and editor (1893–1973)

Joseph Garland (1893 – 1973) was an American pediatrician and editor of The New England Journal of Medicine.

Garland was born in 1893 in Gloucester, Massachusetts. He graduated from Harvard Medical School in 1919 and trained in pediatrics, working at the Massachusetts General Hospital from 1923 to 1954. He was a member of the editorial staff of The New England Journal of Medicine for over 25 years: associate editor (1922–1947), editor (1947–1967), and finally editor emeritus (1967 onwards). Prior to becoming editor, he had published articles in the Journal on a variety of subjects including splanchnic artery aneurysm rupture, varicella infection, and the thymus. He published eight books, including The Story of Medicine (1949).

Garland's father was Gloucester mayor Joseph Garland. He married Mira Crowell, a nurse, with whom he had two children. His son, Joseph E. Garland, was a historian and journalist. He died in 1973, aged 80, at his home in Chestnut Hill, Massachusetts.
