= Hugh Cregg =

American lawyer and politician

District Attorney for Essex County, Massachusetts
- In office 1931–1959
- Preceded by: William G. Clark
- Succeeded by: John P. S. Burke

Member of the Massachusetts Senate for the 5th Essex District
- In office 1921–1929
- Preceded by: Frederick Butler
- Succeeded by: James E. Warren

Personal details
- Born: Hugh Anthony Cregg; November 5, 1888 Lawrence, Massachusetts, U.S.
- Died: May 8, 1960 (aged 71) Methuen, Massachusetts, U.S.
- Party: Republican
- Relations: Huey Lewis (grandson)
- Education: University of Vermont; Boston University School of Law
- Occupation: Lawyer

Hugh Anthony Cregg (November 5, 1888 – May 8, 1960) was an American lawyer and politician who served as District Attorney of Essex County, Massachusetts, from 1931 to 1959.

== Early life ==
Cregg was born on November 5, 1888, in Lawrence, Massachusetts, to Edward and Rose (MacAlister) Cregg. He attended Lawrence public schools, Phillips Exeter Academy, the University of Vermont, and Boston University Law School. He played fullback for the Phillips Exeter and University of Vermont football teams. He was admitted to the bar in 1912 and began practicing in Methuen, Massachusetts.

== Political career ==
=== Early service ===
Cregg served on the Methuen Board of Selectmen from 1923 to 1926 and represented the 5th Essex District in the Massachusetts Senate from 1925 to 1929. In 1928, he chaired a special legislative investigative committee that looked into allegations made by William M. Forgrave that legislators held a "wild party" at the state house and that members of the Massachusetts Department of Public Safety improperly diverted confiscated liquor. The committee found that there was no evidence to support the charges.

=== District Attorney ===
In 1930, Cregg defeated John A. Costello 77,929 votes to 57,284 to become District Attorney of Essex County. In 1931, Cregg prosecuted Russell B. Noble, a 17-year-old from Haverhill, Massachusetts, who ended up pleading guilty to the murder of Clara E. C. Ellis. In 1932, he prosecuted Gus Sonnenberg, a football player and professional wrestler who was charged with drunk driving after the car he was driving hit the car of policeman Richard Morrissey, who was killed. Sonnenberg was acquitted in March 1933.

In 1933, Cregg handled the high-profile prosecution of Jessie Burnett Costello, who was on trial for the murder of her husband, William J. Costello. Costello was found not guilty, however Cregg's performance during the trial was praised. Joseph F. Dinneen of The Boston Daily Globe described Cregg as "the unexpected and surprising star of the trial" and having presented an argument "that might well be the envy of illustrious contemporaries".

On January 2, 1934, C. Fred Sumner, a bill poster, was fatally shot during a robbery of the Paramount Theater in Lynn, Massachusetts. Cab drivers Clement Molway and Louis Berrett were put on trial. Joseph F. Dinneen of The Boston Daily Globe and Lawrence R. Goldberg of The Boston Post were able to link a bullet from the Needham Trust Co. robbery to the murder of Ernest W. Clark. One of the bullets in Clark was then linked to the theater robbery. After Abraham Faber confessed to his role in the robbery and eyewitnesses changed their testimony Cregg dropped the charges against Molway and Berrett.

Cregg faced a tough reelection in 1934. He faced State Senator J. Frank Hughes and Charles A. Clifford in the Republican primary. During the campaign, Hughes attacked Cregg for his handling of the Costello murder trial, the arrest and release of Molway and Berrett, and several other cases. Cregg won the primary with 50% of the vote. In the general election he defeated Democrat John J. Foley by 335 votes.

In March 1935, The Boston Daily Globe reported that Cregg was considering firing his top three aides, Charles A. Green, John E. Wilson, and John J. Ryan. This move upset local Republicans as well as the County Bar Association. It was believed that this was so that Randall T. Cox (nephew of Channing Cox) could be appointed first assistant and eventually run to succeed Cregg. Green resigned instead and Wilson and Ryan were promoted and Cox was added as third assistant. Green challenged Cregg for the Republican nomination in 1938, but Cregg was victorious 56% to 44%. Cregg then defeated Democrat Alphonsus McCarthy in the general election 63% to 37%.

In 1941, Cregg prosecuted John W. Henry, a special policeman from Salisbury, Massachusetts, for the murder of Olive Farrell. Henry allegedly beat Farrell unconscious and left her on Salisbury Beach to drown. Henry was instead found guilty of manslaughter.

Cregg coordinated the investigation into the 1941 murder of Frances Cochran, a 19-year-old Lynn woman whose raped and beaten body was found near a "lovers lane" in Salem, Massachusetts. The investigation involved police from Lynn, Salem, and Swampscott, Massachusetts. The case remains unsolved.

In 1943, Cregg secured the conviction of Roger W. Mason for the murder of his step-daughter, Ruth I. Stone. Later that year he tried Edward Dow for the murder of Lydia Cook also known as the "Egg Lady". Dow, who was 13 years old, was the youngest person to be tried for murder in Massachusetts. Dow was instead found guilty of manslaughter.

In 1951, Cregg's office indicted Dr. Harry Carver Clarke of Marblehead, Massachusetts, for allegedly selling 72 babies to wealthy families. Clarke died before his case went to trial and Cregg discontinued prosecution of his co-conspirator, Marcus Siegel, after he was convicted in New York. That same year Cregg tried Frank and Charles W. McNeil for the murder of Leo F. Monfet. During the trial, Charles McNeil confessed to the crime to clear his brother. As a result Charles was found guilty and sentenced to death while Frank was acquitted.

On May 15, 1956, Massachusetts Attorney General George Fingold reopened the case of Lorraine Clark, who had pleaded guilty to the murder of her husband, Melvin W. Clark Jr. two years earlier. Lorraine Clark was now claiming that her lover Anthony Jackson was the actual murderer. This resulted in a legal battle between Cregg, who believed Clark's original confession, and Fingold. On May 25, a grand jury decided against indicting Jackson for the murder of Melvin W. Clark Jr. Following the jury's decision, Fingold stated that he was shocked by the decision and that Jackson "owe[d] a debt of gratitude to Dist. Atty. Hugh Cregg for his temporary respite from prosecution".

In 1958, Cregg was defeated for reelection by Democrat John P. S. Burke.

== Later life and death ==
Following his defeat, Cregg continued to practice law in Methuen with his son Donald, who had served as first assistant District Attorney when Cregg was DA.

Cregg died on May 8, 1960, at his home in Methuen after suffering a heart attack. He was survived by his wife, Winifred Gerrin Cregg, his daughters Maureen Cregg and Natalie Ballard, and his sons Donald and Dr. Hugh A. Cregg Jr., a radiologist and the father of musician Hugh A. Cregg III, professionally known as Huey Lewis.

== See also ==
- 1925–1926 Massachusetts legislature
- 1927–1928 Massachusetts legislature
