= List of mayors of Gloucester, Massachusetts =

The Mayor of Gloucester, Massachusetts has been the head of the municipal government in Gloucester, Massachusetts since 1874, with the exception of February 10, 1954 to July 1, 1976, when the head of government was the city manager and the mayor was a ceremonial position appointed by the city council.

== List of mayors ==
This is a list of mayors of Gloucester, Massachusetts.

#	Mayor	Picture	Term	Party	Notes
1st	Robert R. Fears		1874–1876	Democratic	
2nd	Allan Rogers		1876–1878	Republican	
3rd	J. Franklin Dyer		1878–1879	Republican	
4th	William Williams		1879–1880	Greenback Party	
5th	Joseph Garland		1880–1882	Republican	
6th	William Williams		1882–1883	Greenback Party	
7th	William H. Wonson III		1883–1885	Republican	
8th	John S. Parsons		1885–1887	Citizen's	
9th	David I. Robinson		1887 – May 24, 1888	Republican	Chose to resign rather comply with writ of mandamus issued by the Massachusetts Supreme Judicial Court ordering him to sign a liquor license.
Acting	Charles Piper		May 24, 1888 – May 29, 1888	Republican	Served as acting mayor in his capacity as president of the board of aldermen.
10th	William Wesley French		May 29, 1888 – 1891	Republican	Elected mayor by a joint session of the board of aldermen and common council to fill the unexpired term of David I. Robinson. Later elected to a full term.
11th	Asa G. Andrews		1891–1894	Republican	
12th	Benjamin F. Cook		1894–1896	Republican	
13th	David I. Robinson		1896–1897	Republican	
14th	Benjamin F. Cook		1897–1898	Republican	
15th	Frank E. Davis		1898–1899	Republican	
16th	William Wesley French		1899–1900	Republican	
17th	George E. MacDonald		1900–1901	Republican	
18th	William Wesley French		1901–1903	Republican	
19th	James E. Tolman		1903–1905	Independent Republican	
20th	George E. MacDonald		1905–1908	Republican	
21st	Henry H. Parsons		1908–1911	No Party Affiliation	
22nd	Isaac Patch		1911–1912	Republican	
23rd	Harry C. Foster		1912–1915	Republican	
24th	C. Homer Barrett		1915–1917	Republican	
25th	John A. Stoddart		1917–1919		First mayor elected in a non-partisan election.
26th	John J. Burke		1919–1920		
27th	Charles D. Brown		1920–1921		
28th	Percy W. Wheeler		1921–1923		
29th	William MacInnis		1923–1925		
30th	Henry H. Parsons		1925–1930		
31st	John E. Parker		1930–1934		
32nd	George H. Newell		1934–1936		
33rd	Weston U. Friend		1936–1938		
34th	Elmer W. Babson		1938–1939		
35th	Sylvester Whalen		1939–1942		
36th	Donald J. Ross		1942–1943		
Acting	Weston U. Friend		1943–1944		Served as acting mayor after Donald J. Ross entered the United States Navy.
37th	Weston U. Friend		1944–1950		
38th	John J. Burke, Jr.		1950–1951		
39th	Joseph Grillo		1951–1954		
40th	Benjamin A. Smith II		1954–1955		Beginning of Plan E Government. City's head of government was the city manager, and the position of mayor was a ceremonial one appointed by the city council.
41st	Beatrice Corliss		1955–1959		
42nd	J. Stanley Boudreau		1960–1961		
43rd	Ralph B. O'Maley		1962–1965		
44th	J. Stanley Boudreau		1965–1966		
45th	Donald H. Lowe		1966–1968		
46th	Joseph F. Grace		1968–1970		
47th	J. Stanley Boudreau		1970–1972		
48th	Robert L. French		1972–1974		
49th	Norman C. Ross		1974–1975		
50th	J. Stanley Boudreau		1975–1976		
51st	Stephen A. Moynahan, Jr.		1976 – July 1, 1976		Final ceremonial mayor under Plan E Government.
52nd	Leo Alper		July 1, 1976 – 1984		
53rd	Richard R. Silva		1984–1988		
54th	William Squillace		1988–1991		Resigned to become Assistant State Treasurer.
Interim	Bruce Tobey		1991–1992		Completed the term of William Squillace.
55th	William Rafter		1992–1994		
56th	Bruce Tobey		1994–2002		
57th	John Bell		2002–2008		
58th	Carolyn Kirk		2008 – January 6, 2015		Resigned to become the state's Deputy Secretary of Housing and Community Development.
Acting	Paul McGeary		January 6, 2015 – January 9, 2015		Served as acting mayor in his capacity as president of the city council.
Interim	Sefatia Romeo Theken		January 9, 2015 – January 1, 2016		Chosen by the city council to complete the term of Carolyn Kirk.
59th	Sefatia Romeo Theken		January 1, 2016 – January 1, 2022		
60th	Gregory P. Verga		January 1, 2022–Present		

== List of city managers ==
#	City Manager	Term	Notes
1st	Dean C. Cushing	February 10, 1954 – June 1, 1956	
Acting	Kenneth S. Webster	June 1, 1956– July 31, 1956	
2nd	Richard Walden Mayo	July 31, 1956 – 1958	
3rd	Philip Tartas	October 13, 1958 – September 25, 1967	
4th	Paul Talbot	March 11, 1968 – July 1, 1976	

== See also ==
- Timeline of Gloucester, Massachusetts
