= Allan Rogers (American politician) =

American politician (1814–1887

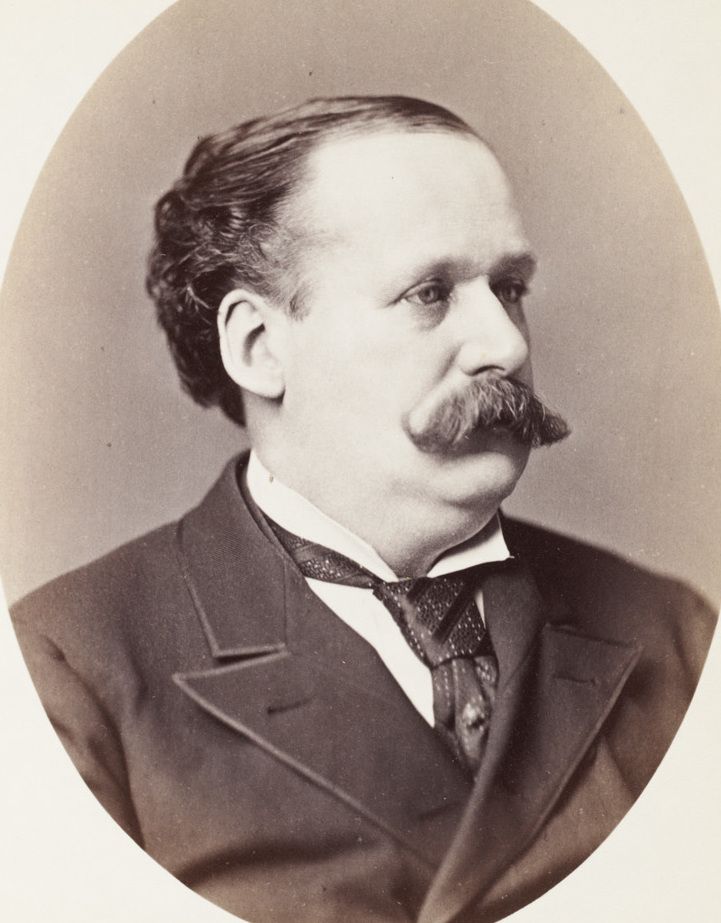

Member of the Massachusetts Senate from the Third Essex District
- In office 1878–1878
- Preceded by: Charles Howes
- Succeeded by: Jonas H. French

Mayor of Gloucester, Massachusetts
- In office 1876–1878
- Preceded by: Robert R. Fears
- Succeeded by: J. Franklin Dyer

Personal details
- Born: September 6, 1832 East Bridgewater, Massachusetts, U.S.
- Died: October 29, 1913 (aged 81) Gloucester, Massachusetts, U.S.
- Party: Republican
- Spouse: Harriet Calef (m. 1861; died 1905)
- Children: 2

Allan Rogers (September 6, 1832 – October 29, 1913) was an American politician who was the second mayor of Gloucester, Massachusetts.

== Biography ==
Rogers was born on September 6, 1832 in East Bridgewater, Massachusetts. He was a descendant of Mayflower passenger Thomas Rogers. Rogers graduated from the Bridgewater Academy in 1847 and resided in Whitman, Massachusetts until moving to Gloucester in 1852. He worked in the dry goods house of John C. Calef & Co. and married Calef's oldest daughter, Harriet, on September 5, 1861.

In 1873, Rogers was elected to the Gloucester board of selectmen. In 1875, he defeated incumbent Robert R. Fears 1,128 to 777 to become mayor. He was reelected without opposition in 1876. His primary objective as mayor was reducing the city's debt. He did not seek a third term in 1877, but was instead elected to the Massachusetts Senate. From 1875 to 1893, he was a member of the Gloucester school committee.

Rogers died on October 29, 1913 at his home in Gloucester. He was predeceased by his wife and survived by two daughters.
