= Dick Dunn (sports promoter) =

American sports promoter

Richard George Dunn was an American sports promoter who was general manager of the Detroit Olympia and Boston Garden.

== Early life ==
Dunn began his career at the age of 12, when he began delivering press notices for his father, New York City boxing announcer Johnny Dunn. He then worked for bicycle race promoters Patrick T. Powers and Harry Pollock. During World War I, Dunn served with a machine gun battalion of the 77th Infantry Division. While overseas, he was a boxing champion in three classes.

== Career ==
=== Madison Square Garden ===
Dunn began his association with Madison Square Garden as a phone operator in the superintendent's office. When Tex Rickard took over the arena, Dunn worked as an usher. He then rose through the ranks, working as a ticket taker, ticket seller, concession manager, time keep, assistant superintendent, and finally superintendent. In addition to working at both the second and third Madison Square Gardens, Dunn, along with MSG vice president William F. Carey, supervised the construction of Philadelphia's John F. Kennedy Stadium. Dunn also promoted the July 3, 1931 Max Schmeling–Young Stribling fight at Cleveland's Municipal Stadium for the Madison Square Garden Corporation.

=== Detroit Olympia ===
In 1928, Dunn became general manager of the Detroit Olympia. In his first year as manager, Dunn's fights drew a total of $400,000 and the Olympia was one of a few boxing arenas in the country to be profitable during that time.

=== Boston Garden ===
In 1931, Dunn left Detroit to become general manager of the MSG-owned Boston Garden. Dunn booked a wide variety of events for the Garden, including an Aimee Semple McPherson revival, a welterweight championship bout between Young Jack Thompson and Lou Brouillard, New England's first rodeo event, and a Reinald Werrenrath concert. He attempted to bring Father Charles Coughlin (the two had become friends while Dunn worked in Detroit) to the Garden, but was blocked by the Archdiocese of Boston. Dunn was able to bring the Garden from a deficit to a $200,000 profit in his first year as manager.

Dunn also promoted the Garden's events at Rockingham Park in Salem, New Hampshire, which included the New England States Fair, automobile races, and Grand Circuit harness racing stakes races.

=== Independent promoter ===
Dunn resigned as general manager of the Boston Garden on August 2, 1932, to become an independent promotor. During the 1930s, he promoted motor races at Readville Race Track in Boston, Elsmere Speedway in Elsmere, Delaware, Sage Park Speedway in Windsor, Connecticut, and Woodbridge Speedway in Woodbridge Township, New Jersey and assisted in the promotion of midget car racing at Amherst Speedway in Amherst, New Hampshire.

In 1932 and 1933, he promoted wrestling cards at the Olympia headlined by Gus Sonnenberg, Ed Don George, Dick Shikat, Sándor Szabó, and Karol Zbyszko. In 1935, he promoted wrestling at Brooklyn's Prospect Hall.

In 1934, Dunn, Johnny Buckley, and Homer Rainault formed a fight syndicate known as the Sharkey Athletic Association. The organization promoted fights at Boston's Mechanics Hall. Dunn hired Jessie Costello, who was acquitted of the murder of her husband at a highly publicized trial, to be the club's general treasurer. The Sharkey A.A. also hosted a weekly boxing tournament at the Ritz Plaza ballroom. Dunn attempted to lease the Boston Garden to host fights, but was turned down.
