= C. Homer Barrett =

American politician

Member of the Massachusetts House of Representatives from the 16th Essex district
- In office 1943–1947
- Preceded by: William G. Clark, Jr.
- Succeeded by: William G. Clark, Jr.

Mayor of Gloucester, Massachusetts
- In office 1915–1917
- Preceded by: Harry C. Foster
- Succeeded by: John A. Stoddart

Member of the Massachusetts House of Representatives
- In office 1908–1910

Personal details
- Born: June 23, 1868 Gloucester, Massachusetts
- Died: March 12, 1958 (aged 89) Gloucester, Massachusetts
- Party: Republican

Charles Homer Barrett (1868–1958) was an American politician from Gloucester, Massachusetts.

== Early life ==
Barrett was born on June 23, 1868, in Gloucester. He attended Gloucester public schools and worked in the grocery business before entering politics.

== Political career ==
In 1896, Barrett was elected to the Gloucester commons council. He then served on the board of aldermen from 1898 to 1900 and again 1902 to 1904. From 1908 to 1910 he was a member of the Massachusetts House of Representatives. He then returned to the board of aldermen, serving as an at-large member from 1910 to 1915. From 1915 to 1917 he was the Mayor of Gloucester. He once again returned to the board of aldermen in 1917.

From 1918 to 1930, Barrett was the city's superintendent of streets. From 1939 to 1956 he was Gloucester's park commissioner. He also served a second stint in the Massachusetts House of Representatives, representing the 16th Essex district from 1943 to 1947.

== Later life and death ==
Barrett retired from government in 1956 and remained in Gloucester until his death on March 12, 1958.
