= Frederick R. Sullivan =

American politician

Sheriff of Suffolk County, Massachusetts
- In office November 15, 1939 – January 19, 1968
- Preceded by: John F. Dowd
- Succeeded by: John W. Sears

Chairman of the Boston School Committee
- In office 1936–1937

Personal details
- Born: 1905 Charlestown, Boston, Massachusetts
- Died: January 19, 1968 (aged 62) Brighton, Boston, Massachusetts
- Party: Democratic
- Education: Harvard College; Harvard Business School

Frederick Richard Sullivan (1905 – January 19, 1968) was an American politician who served as sheriff of Suffolk County, Massachusetts from 1939 to 1968.

== Early life ==
Sullivan was born in 1905 in Charlestown. He graduated from Boston Latin School and attended Harvard College, where he was a member of the school's crew and won three championships in boxing. He graduated from Harvard in 1927 and worked for the Boston & Maine Railroad to pay for Harvard Business School. While attending business school, Sullivan coached the varsity crew. After earning his graduate degree, Sullivan worked for the Atlantic Precision Instrument Co. before going into the insurance business.

== Political career ==
In 1933, Sullivan was elected to the Boston School Committee. In 1936 and 1937 he served as committee chairman. In 1939, Suffolk County Sheriff John F. Dowd resigned while under criminal corruption investigation. Governor Leverett Saltonstall appointed Sullivan to finish Dowd's term. He won a full term in 1940 by defeating city councilor and state senator John E. Kerrigan, state senator Edward C. Carroll, and former Boston city assessor Timothy W. Murphy in the Democratic primary. In 1943 he joined the United States Army, where he earned as Bronze Star for moving vital cargo while commanding a quartermaster group. He was reelected in 1944 while still serving oversees. His brother-in-law, Deputy Sheriff James J. Mellen served as acting sheriff until Sullivan's return in January 1946. In 1955, Sullivan was charged with negligence following the escape of Elmer "Trigger" Burke. He was acquitted and remained sheriff until his death on January 19, 1968.
