= John F. Dowd =

American politician

- Dowd circa 1925

Sheriff of Suffolk County, Massachusetts
- In office December 16, 1938 – November 13, 1939
- Preceded by: John A. Keliher
- Succeeded by: Frederick R. Sullivan

President of the Boston City Council
- In office 1934
- Preceded by: Joseph McGrath
- Succeeded by: John I. Fitzgerald

Member of the Boston City Council from Ward 8
- In office 1926–1938
- Preceded by: District created
- Succeeded by: William F. Hurley

Personal details
- Born: November 28, 1895 Boston, Massachusetts, U.S.
- Died: August 9, 1961 (aged 65) Boston, Massachusetts, U.S.
- Party: Democratic

John F. Dowd (November 28, 1895 – August 9, 1961) was an American politician who served as sheriff of Suffolk County, Massachusetts, from 1938 to 1939. He pleaded guilty to corruption charges after spending 22 months as a fugitive.

== Early life ==
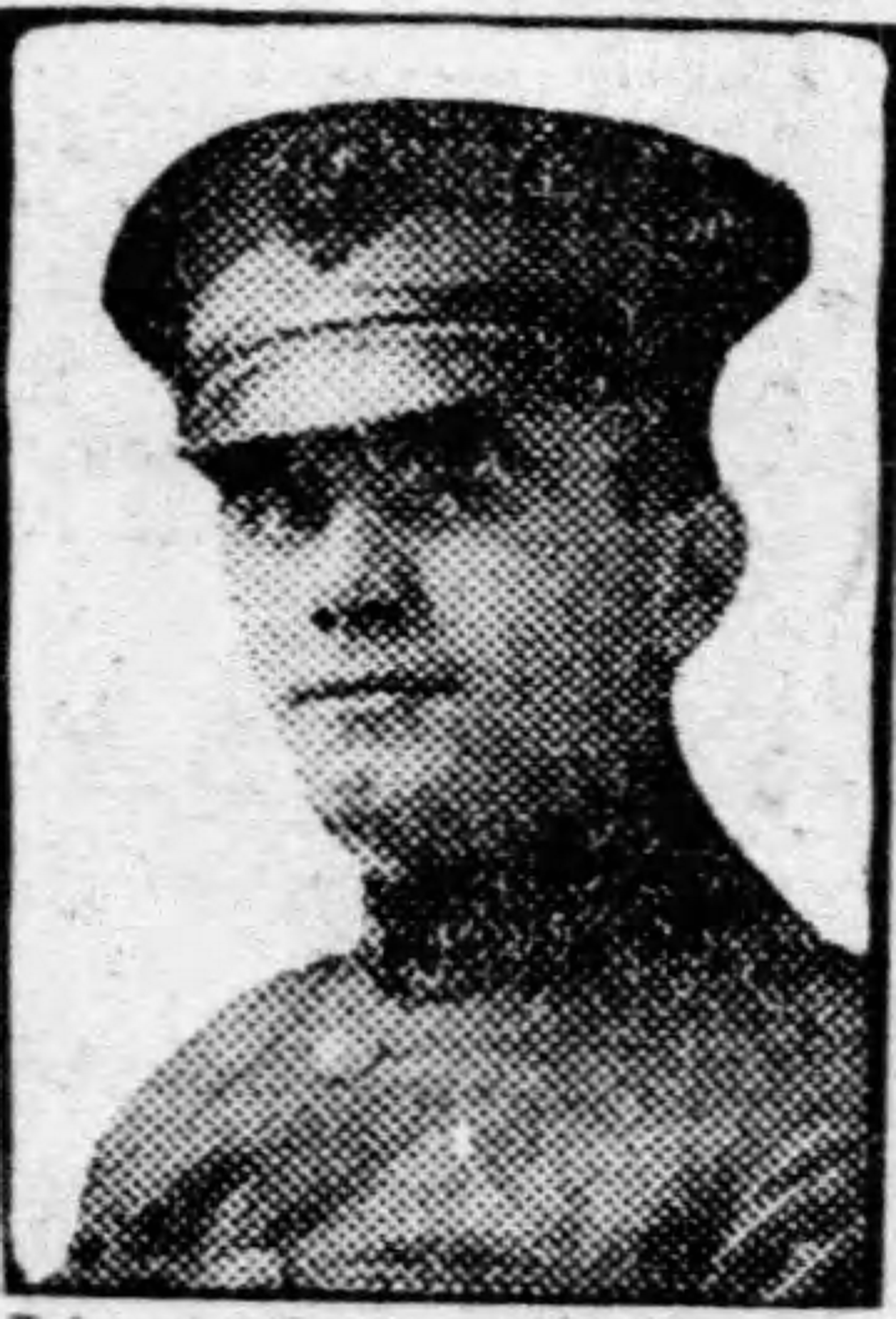
Dowd circa 1918

Dowd was born in Boston on November 28, 1895. He served as a first lieutenant in the United States Army for 18 months during World War I, but was not deployed abroad. He worked as a florist and ran his own shop from 1917 until it went bankrupt in 1932.

== Political career ==
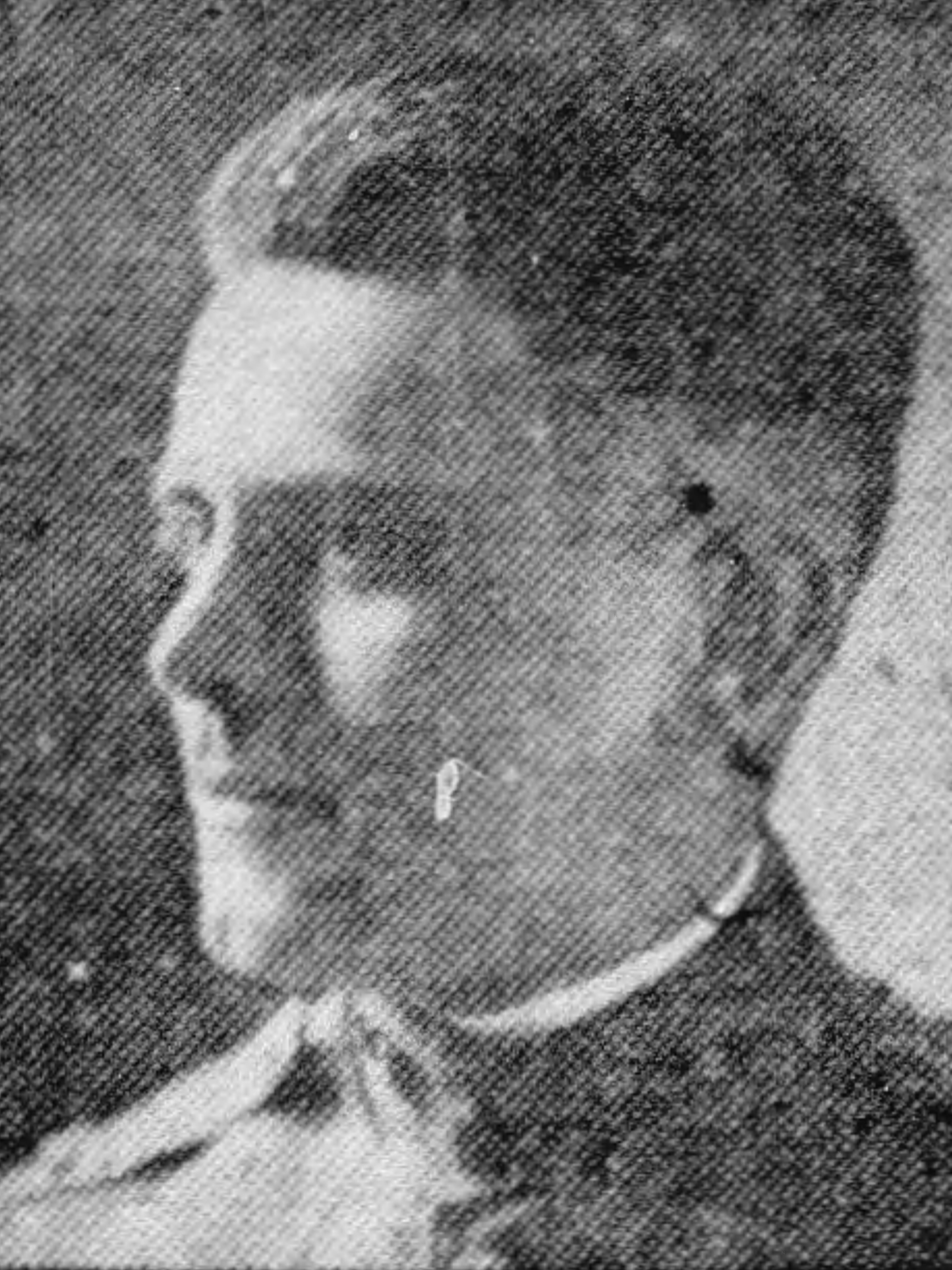
Dowd circa 1921

A member of Ward 8's Tammany Club, Dowd served was appointed Director of Americanization by Mayor James Michael Curley in 1921. He later served on Curley's secretarial staff and was an unsuccessful candidate for the city council in 1924. Dowd represented Ward 8 on the Boston City Council from 1926 to 1938. As a member of the city council, Dowd was a critic of his former boss, James Michael Curley, fought to dismiss city employees who did not reside in Boston, and pushed for changes at Boston City Hospital. He was the council president in 1934.

In 1932 he was an unsuccessful candidate for Suffolk County Sheriff. In 1938, Dowd defeated 21 year incumbent John A. Keliher in the Democratic primary. Keliher died on primary day and Dowd was appointed by Governor Charles F. Hurley to finish out Keliher's term. Once Dowd took office, he created a scale of kickbacks for employees to keep or obtain jobs with the sheriff's department. Deputy sheriffs were to pay $2,500 a year, guards between $500 and $2,500, and chorewoman $250. In exchange for money, Dowd treated prisoners in the Charles Street Jail with access to the hospital wing (which contained ping-pong tables, radios, books, and a solarium), provided them with meals from the city's best restaurants, kept cell doors open, granted unlimited access to the phone and visitors, and permitted access to the cocktail bar in his office. One prisoner, Reverend William M. Forgrave, was allowed to run a bookmaking operation.

=== Indictment and fugitive status ===
While investigating Suffolk Civil Court Clerk John Patrick Connolly for soliciting kickbacks, Superior Court auditor Reuben Lurie was informed of the situation in the Sheriff's department by one of Connolly's employees. In September 1939, the Boston Bar Association petitioned the Massachusetts Supreme Judicial Court to remove Dowd for allegedly soliciting and accepting bribes from people applying for jobs with Suffolk County. On Friday, November 10, 1939, three days before the hearing on his removal, Dowd signed a letter of resignation, which he gave to his attorney, and left for New York City. The next day, he was found lying on a sidewalk and was later treated at Bellevue Hospital for superficial injuries. He used an emergency fire exit to avoid reporters and was seen getting into a car with his wife and brother-in-law. His whereabouts after leaving the hospital were unknown. On November 27, a grand jury indicted Dowd on charges of seeking $36,000 in gratuities. A warrant was issued for his arrest and the Boston Police Department sent out circulars containing Dowd's photograph and fingerprints nationwide. The trail for Dowd led police to Mexico City, Honolulu, and San Luis Obispo, California, but he avoided capture each time.

=== Capture ===
On September 22, 1941, Dowd, using the name John W. Norton, was arrested in San Luis Obispo on a drunk driving charge. He was found guilty and fined $50. His fingerprints were taken during the booking process and San Luis Obispo police discovered that he was a wanted fugitive. They informed police in Ventura, California, where Dowd had been residing for the past six months, who arrested him at his home.

On October 17, 1941, Dowd pleaded guilty to charges of conspiracy and soliciting and accepting gratuities. He was sentenced to two concurrent sentences of six to eight years in prison. He was released on parole in October 1945. He died on August 9, 1961, in Dorchester.
