= J. Franklin Dyer =

American physician and politician (1814–1887)

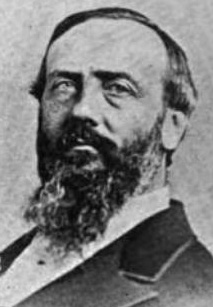

Mayor of Gloucester, Massachusetts
- In office 1878–1879
- Preceded by: Allan Rogers
- Succeeded by: William Williams

Personal details
- Born: April 15, 1826 Eastport, Maine, U.S.
- Died: February 1, 1879 (aged 52) Gloucester, Massachusetts, U.S.
- Party: Republican
- Education: Bowdoin Medical School
- Occupation: Physician

Jonah Franklin Dyer (April 15, 1826 – February 1, 1879) was an American physician and politician who was a Union Army surgeon during the American Civil War and mayor of Gloucester, Massachusetts in 1878.

== Early life ==
Dyer was born on April 15, 1826 in Eastport, Maine. He graduated from Bowdoin Medical School in 1849 and practiced in Boston for two years before moving to Gloucester's Annisquam neighborhood.

== Military service ==
Dyer mustered into the Union Army on August 22, 1861. He spent three years as a surgeon in the 19th Massachusetts Infantry Regiment. On December 3, 1862, he was appointed surgeon-in-chief, Second Division, II Corps. He was present at the Battle of Ball's Bluff, Siege of Yorktown, Battle of West Point, Battle of Seven Pines, Battle of Savage's Station, Battle of White Oak Swamp, Battle of Glendale, Battle of Malvern Hill, First and Second Battles of Bull Run, Battle of South Mountain, Battle of Antietam, Battle of Fredericksburg, Battle of Chancellorsville, Battle of Gettysburg, Battle of Bristoe Station, Battle of Mine Run, Battle of the Wilderness, Battle of Spotsylvania Court House, Battle of North Anna, Battle of Cold Harbor, and the First Battle of Deep Bottom. He was discharged on August 28, 1864.

Dyer’s wartime letters to his wife were later published as The Journal of a Civil War Surgeon.

== Politics ==
Dyer served for many years on Gloucester’s school committee, board of health, and as town physician. He represented the community in the 1869 Massachusetts legislature. When the city form of government was adopted in 1873, Dyer was elected to represent Ward 6 on the board of aldermen. He was the Republican nominee for mayor in 1877 and defeated Democrat Samuel A. Stacy 1075 votes to 1006. He did not seek reelection and was succeeded by William Williams.

Dyer died on February 1, 1879 "after over a year's illness of consumption".
