= William G. Clark Jr. =

American jurist and politician (1912–1990)

William G. Clark, Jr.

Member of the Massachusetts House of Representatives from the 16th Essex district
- In office 1941–1942
- Preceded by: Grover N. Dodge
- Succeeded by: C. Homer Barrett
- In office 1947–1949
- Preceded by: C. Homer Barrett
- Succeeded by: Seat eliminated

Personal details
- Born: May 6, 1912 Gloucester, Massachusetts
- Died: November 14, 1990 (aged 78) Boston, Massachusetts
- Party: Republican
- Relations: William G. Clark (father)
- Education: Duke University; Boston University School of Law

William Groves Clark, Jr. (1912–1990) was an American jurist and politician who served as an associate justice of Gloucester District Court and was a member of the Massachusetts House of Representatives.

== Early life ==
Clark was born on May 6, 1912, in Gloucester, Massachusetts. He graduated from Worcester Academy in 1931, Duke University in 1935, and the Boston University School of Law in 1938.

== Political career ==
Clark served as a member of the Massachusetts House of Representatives from 1941 to 1942. During World War II, he worked in counter espionage for the Federal Bureau of Investigation. After the war, he was once again elected to the House of Representatives, where he served from 1947 to 1949.

== Legal career ==
Clark began practicing law in Gloucester in 1938. In 1972 he was appointed to the Gloucester District Court by Governor Francis W. Sargent. He remained on the bench until his retirement in 1982.

== Death ==
Clark died on November 14, 1990, at Massachusetts General Hospital.

== See also ==
- 1941–1942 Massachusetts legislature
- 1947–1948 Massachusetts legislature
