= William M. Forgrave =

- Born: January 24, 1888; Stalwart, Michigan, U.S.
- Died: January 19, 1953 (aged 64); Newton, Michigan, U.S.
- Occupations: Methodist minister Stockbroker
- Known for: Leading the Massachusetts Anti-Saloon League; Larceny convictions

William Matthew Forgrave (January 24, 1888 – January 19, 1953) was an American minister and temperance activist who served as Superintendent of the Massachusetts Anti-Saloon League from 1924 to 1928. He later worked as a stock broker and was convicted of larceny.

== Early work ==
Forgrave was born on January 24, 1888, in Stalwart, Michigan. On August 11, 1911, he married Mabel Campbell of Stirlingville, Michigan. He began teaching school at the age of 18 and became the pastor of the Methodist Episcopal Church in Aloha, Michigan, two years later. After graduating from the Ferris Institute, Forgrave moved east to attend the Boston University School of Theology. He served as a pastor in East Kingston, New Hampshire, from 1910 to 1912. After graduating from BU, Forgrave was ordained into the Methodist ministry and served pastorates in Raymond, New Hampshire (1914 to 1915) and Kittery, Maine (1915 to 1917).

== Massachusetts Anti-Saloon League ==
=== Early work ===
Forgrave began his temperance activities in 1908 with the Michigan Anti-Saloon League. From 1912 to 1913 he was the field secretary for the Massachusetts Anti-Saloon League. In 1917 he became the district secretary for the Portsmouth, New Hampshire YMCA.

At the beginning of World War I, Forgrave was a member of the faculty of the War Work Training Commission at the YMCA College. In 1918 he was stationed by the YMCA with American troops in Siberia. After the war he spent two and a half years as the general secretary of the YMCA in Manila.

After leaving the Philippines, Forgrave moved to Springfield, Massachusetts, where he became superintendent of the Central Western district of the Massachusetts Anti-Saloon League. As district superintendent, Forgrave led drives on prohibition law violators in Springfield, Chicopee, North Adams, Greenfield, and Holyoke. In 1922 he was made an assistant to state superintendent Arthur J. Davis. He was elected state superintendent on February 12, 1924.

=== State superintendent ===
In his first year as superintendent, Forgrave was tasked with leading the group's campaign for the referendum on the state's liquor enforcement code. Although the question had been defeated by 103,000 votes two years before it passed by a majority of 8,000 under Forgrave's leadership. Following Wayne Wheeler's death in 1927, Forgrave was mentioned as his possible successor as national leader, but he decided not to seek the position.

During his tenure as superintendent, Forgrave made a number of sensational statements against political leaders and law enforcement. In 1924 his accusations that the office of U.S. Attorney Robert O. Harris was lax in enforcing prohibition laws were thrown out by a grand jury for being "vague, misleading and unproved". In 1928, the Massachusetts General Court investigated charges by Forgrave that members of the body held a "wild party" on April 28, 1927, and that liquor confiscated by the Massachusetts Department of Public Safety had been given away. He was unable to produce any strong evidence that such a party occurred and a special investigative committee found his charges unsubstantiated. Forgrave, however, refused to retract his allegations and on July 12, 1928, the Massachusetts House of Representatives voted 97 to 93 to censure him and strip him of his right to act as a legislative agent. The Senate rejected the censure amendment 23 to 10 after Senator Hugh Cregg argued that the amendment was illegal, as no individual had ever been censured without a hearing.

Forgrave resigned as superintendent on November 27, 1928, and was succeeded by Gordon C. McMaster. He decided to step down because he was contemplating divorce and he did not want his personal life to reflect upon the organization. In December 1929, Forgrave divorced his wife in Reno, Nevada, and she was granted custody of their only daughter. He married his second wife, Anna Helrich, on February 28, 1930, in New York City. The two resided with Helrich's family in Everett, Massachusetts, until the marriage ended in divorce on October 18, 1933.

== Criminal conviction ==
After leaving the Anti-Saloon League, Forgrave worked as a stock broker in Boston. Following his second divorce he moved to an apartment in Cambridge, Massachusetts. In August 1937, Forgrave's firm, Brown, Anthony & Co., consented to a perpetual injunction issued by the United States District Court for the District of Massachusetts that prevented it from selling securities while insolvent. Later the securities division of the Massachusetts Department of Utilities revoked its brokerage registration on the grounds that the business was running in a fraudulent manner.

On April 20, 1938, Forgrave was indicted on 13 counts of larceny and 11 counts of conspiracy to steal for his alleged involvement in a $100,000 stock swindle. On December 28, 1938, Forgrave was found guilty of 19 counts of larceny and conspiracy. He was sentenced to four and a half years, with two and a half to be served at the Charlestown State Prison and the remainder to be served in the House of Correction. He appealed his convictions to the Massachusetts Supreme Judicial Court. While his case was under appeal, Forgrave was held in the Charles Street Jail in lieu of bail. While there, it was alleged that he ran a bookmaking operation in the jail during the reign of Sheriff John F. Dowd. In 1940, the Massachusetts Supreme Judicial Court overturned Forgrave's conspiracy convictions, but upheld his convictions on the larceny charges.

Forgrave spent his later years in Newton Township, Mackinac County, Michigan. He died suddenly on January 19, 1953. He was survived by his third wife and daughter.

Party political offices
Preceded by Arthur J. Davis	Superintendent of the Massachusetts Anti-Saloon League; 1923–1928	Succeeded by Gordon C. McMaster
