= William Williams (Massachusetts politician) =

American politician (1814–1887)

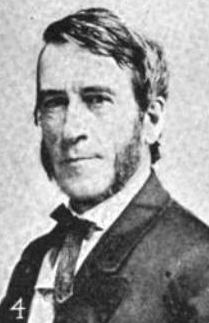

Mayor of Gloucester, Massachusetts
- In office 1879–1880
- Preceded by: J. Franklin Dyer
- Succeeded by: Joseph Garland
- In office 1882–1883
- Preceded by: Joseph Garland
- Succeeded by: William H. Wonson III

Personal details
- Born: August 6, 1814 Newburyport, Massachusetts, U.S.
- Died: February 4, 1887 (aged 72) Gloucester, Massachusetts, U.S.
- Party: Greenback
- Education: Bowdoin College
- Occupation: Lawyer

William Williams (August 6, 1814 – February 4, 1887) was an American politician who was mayor of Gloucester, Massachusetts in 1879 and 1882.

== Early life ==
Williams was born on August 6, 1814 in Newburyport, Massachusetts. He attended Newburyport High School and the Dummer Academy, received his college education at Bowdoin College, and studied law in the office of A. W. Wells in Newburyport.

== Politics ==
Williams was principal of the Marblehead High School and represented the town in the Massachusetts House of Representatives in 1840. He was admitted to the bar in 1840 and opened a law office in Gloucester. From 1845 to 1876, he worked in the Boston Custom House. In the 1878 elections, most Massachusetts Democrats shifted to the Greenback Party. Williams was the Greenback nominee for mayor of Gloucester and defeated Republican Henry A. Parmenter 1,291 votes to 813. The Greenbacks also won five of the eight aldermen seats and swept the school committee races. During the first week in office, Williams a deficit of $8,600 in the city treasury. The deficit was covered by the city treasurer's bondsmen, who were partially reimbursed by him. Treasurer H. A. Burnham resigned his office on January 10, 1879. Williams was defeated for reelection by Republican Joseph Garland 1,260 votes to 954. According to historian James Robert Pringle, Williams was beaten "mainly through misrepresentation". Garland did not run for reelection in 1881 and Williams defeated David I. Robinson 1,011 votes to 863. He did not run for reelection and was succeeded by William H. Wonson III. Williams sought to return to office in 1883, but finished last in a four-way contest behind Wonson, Robinson, and Daniel D. Saunders. Williams died on February 4, 1887.
