= David I. Robinson =

American politician

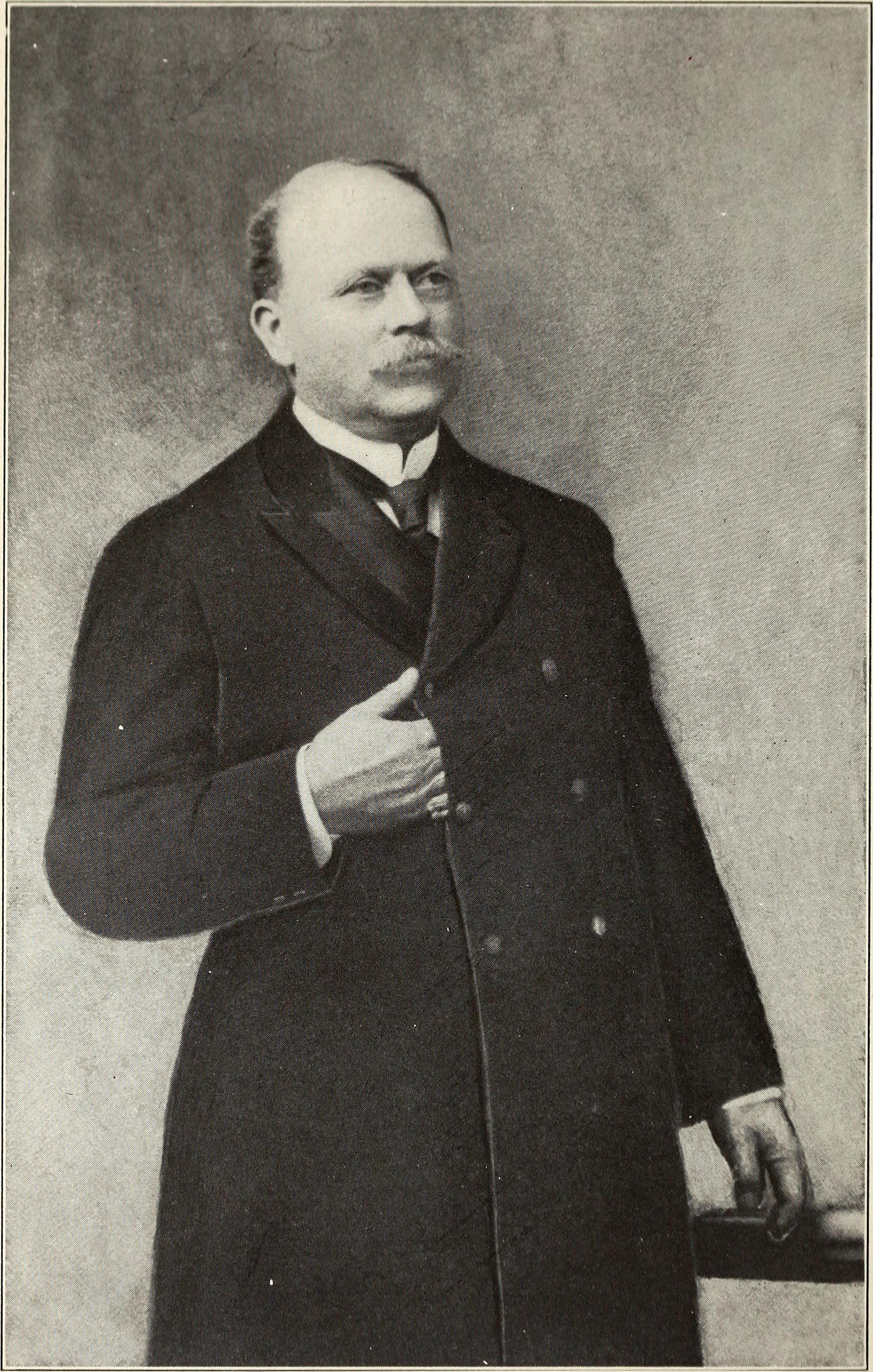

Treasurer of Essex County, Massachusetts
- In office 1904–1921
- Preceded by: E. Kendall Jenkins
- Succeeded by: Phoebe M. Curtis

Member of the Massachusetts Governor's Council from the 5th District
- In office 1902–1904
- Preceded by: George F. Harwood
- Succeeded by: George R. Jewett

Mayor of Gloucester, Massachusetts
- In office 1896–1897
- Preceded by: Benjamin F. Cook
- Succeeded by: Benjamin F. Cook
- In office 1887–1888
- Preceded by: John S. Parsons
- Succeeded by: William Wesley French

Personal details
- Born: David Ingersoll Robinson; October 6, 1844; Manchester-by-the-Sea, Massachusetts
- Died: November 13, 1921 (aged 77); Gloucester, Massachusetts
- Political party: Republican

David Ingersoll Robinson (October 6, 1844 – November 13, 1921) was an American politician who served as Mayor of Gloucester, Massachusetts, and Treasurer of Essex County, Massachusetts, was a member of the Gloucester Common Council and the Massachusetts Governor's Council.

== Early life ==
Robinson was born on October 6, 1844, in Manchester-by-the-Sea, Massachusetts, to John Robinson, a shoemaker and singing teacher, and his wife Sarah Lufkin (Ingersoll) Robinson. In 1851 the family moved to Alton, Illinois. After he graduated from Alton High School, Robinson taught in the Alton public school system. He enlisted in the Union Army on May 12, 1864 for a term of 100 days and was assigned to the 133rd Illinois Volunteer Infantry Regiment as a private. He reenlisted on September 24, 1864, and was appointed as first lieutenant. However, a severe illness prevented him from being mustered back into the service. After he recovered, Robinson spent the remainder of the war as a clerk in the Provost Marshal's office in Alton. After the war, Robinson was involved in various business pursuits in Alton.

== Business career ==
In 1868, Robinson moved to Gloucester, Massachusetts. On January 21, 1869, he married Helen Amanda Smith. Soon afterward he was hired as a bookkeeper by Stockbridge & Smith. He later became a partner in the business, which became known as Stockbridge & Co. In 1876 Stockbridge & Co. consolidated with the Gloucester Fresh Fish Company and Stenson & Company to form the Atlantic Halibut Company. Robinson was Atlantic Halibut's treasurer and secretary. In 1895, Atlantic Halibut consolidated with some smaller firms to form the American Halibut Company. Robinson was the new company's treasurer. In addition to his work with Atlantic/American Halibut, Robinson served as a president of the Gloucester Fisherman's Institute for five years and was a director of the City National Bank of Gloucester.

== Fraternal organizations and groups ==
Robinson was involved with a number of fraternal organizations. He was twice elected Supreme Templar of the Templars of Honor and Temperance. He was also elected Grand Commander of Massachusetts of the Knights of Malta and in 1890 was a representative to the Imperial Body of the Knights of Malta in Glasgow. From 1902 to 1912, Robinson was president of the Robinson Genealogical Society. He was also a member of the Sons of Temperance, Grand Army of the Republic, and the Freemasons.

== Political career ==
In 1879, Robinson was elected to the Gloucester Common Council. In 1881 he was elected Council President. He ran for Mayor in 1881, but lost to William Williams 1,011 votes to 863. He ran again in 1883. In a four way race, Robinson received 635 votes, which put him behind incumbent William H. Wonson III (873 votes), but ahead of fellow challengers Daniel D. Saunders (454) and William Williams (282).

=== Mayor of Gloucester ===
Robinson ran for a third time in 1886. This time he was successful, winning by 142 votes. He ran for reelection in 1887, and received 1,203 votes to Daniel D. Saunders' 1,197 and John S. Parsons' 203. Due to the close result, a recount was held, which determined that Robinson had beaten Saunders by four votes (1,200 to 1,196). Although Gloucester elected a Temperance mayor, it also voted to allow liquor licenses. The Board of Aldermen approved three licenses, but Robinson refused to sign them. George A. Davis, a bottler of malt liquor whose license Robinson refused to sign, applied to the Massachusetts Supreme Judicial Court for a writ of mandamus compelling Robinson to sign his license. The Court sided with Davis and issued a writ ordering him to sign the license. Robinson still refused to sign and on May 24, 1888, he presented his resignation to the Board of Aldermen.

Robinson returned to the office of Mayor by defeating incumbent Benjamin F. Cook in 1895. Cook then defeated Robinson the following year.

During his tenure as Mayor, Gloucester erected a number of new buildings, including a new high school, armory, police station and courthouse, and paved a large amount of its streets. The city's financial condition also improved, as its debt was bonded at a reduced rate of interest.

=== Massachusetts Governor's Council ===
From 1902 to 1904, Robinson was a member of the Massachusetts Governor's Council. He was a member of the Council's committees on Harbors and Public Lands, Charitable Institutions, Prisons, Military and Naval Affairs, and Warrants as well as the committee that organized the dedication ceremony for the Dorchester Heights Monument.

=== Essex County Treasurer ===
In 1903, Robinson was elected Essex County Treasurer. He held this position until his death on November 13, 1921. During his final year in office, Robinson had come under fire for depositing $233,679 of county funds with the Tremont Trust Company of Boston, not only because Tremont had been closed by Massachusetts Bank Commissioner Joseph Allen, but because Robinson had promised to deposit all of Essex County's money in banks located in the county.
