= William G. Clark (Massachusetts lawyer) =

American lawyer (1879-1961)

William Groves Clark (September 4, 1879 – January 26, 1961) was an American lawyer who served as district attorney of Essex County, Massachusetts from 1923 to 1931.

Clark served as an assistant district attorney from 1919 to 1922 and was district attorney from 1923 to 1931. He did not seek reelection in 1930 and entered private practice in Gloucester, Massachusetts and Salem, Massachusetts.

In 1933, Clark handled the high-profile defense of Jessie Burnett Costello, who was on trial for the murder of her husband, William J. Costello. Costello was found not guilty.

From 1936 to 1939, Clark was the president of the Essex County Bar Association.

In 1952, Clark represented Marblehead, Massachusetts physician Harry C. Clarke and his wife and practical nurse Alice Clarke, who were indicted in Massachusetts in New York on charges related to providing newborns to baby broker Marcus S. Seigel. The case never went to trial as on February 21, 1952, Harry C. Clarke suffered a heart attack and died while delivering a baby.

Clark died on January 26, 1961, in Gloucester. He was survived by his second wife and three sons, including William G. Clark Jr. He was buried in Oak Grove Cemetery in Gloucester.

Political offices
| Preceded by S. Howard Donnell | District Attorney of Essex County, Massachusetts; 1923–1931 | Succeeded by Hugh Cregg |
