= Joseph E. Garland =

American historian and journalist (1922–2011)

Joseph E. Garland (September 30, 1922 – August 30, 2011) was an American historian and journalist who wrote extensively about the city of Gloucester, Massachusetts and its fishing industry.

== Biography ==
Garland was born in Brookline, Massachusetts in 1922 to a prominent Boston area family. Garland's degree at Harvard University was interrupted by service in the United States Army in 1943. Following the war, he worked as a reporter for the Minneapolis Tribune, Providence Journal, and Boston Herald, before settling on Eastern Point, in Gloucester, Massachusetts in the home of his great grandfather Joseph Garland (mayor). While living in Gloucester Garland was an involved community member, notably acting as the first president of the restoration project of the Adventure.

Garland was married two times, first to Rebecca Choate, and later to Helen Bryan Garland.

== Notable published works ==
- Lone Voyager (a biography of Howard Blackburn)
- Gloucester on the Wind
- Guns Off Gloucester
- Down to the Sea
- Unknown Soldiers: Reliving World War
- The Gloucester Guide
- Bear of the Sea: Giant Jim Pattillo
- The Fish and the Falcon: Gloucester's Resolute Role in America's Fight for Freedom
- Beating to Windward (collection of columns published in the Gloucester Daily Times)
- Boston's Gold Coast: The North Shore
