= Murder trial of Jessie Costello =

1933 US criminal trial

Jessie Burnett Costello (née Fyfe)
- Born: September 15, 1902; Yonkers, New York, U.S.
- Died: March 28, 1971 (aged 68); Peabody, Massachusetts, U.S.
- Criminal charge: Murder
- Criminal penalty: Acquitted
- Spouse: William J. Costello (m. 1923)
- Children: Four
- Parent(s): Andrew and Jessie Fyfe

On February 17, 1933, William J. Costello, a fire captain in Peabody, Massachusetts, was found dead by his wife, Jessie B. Costello. After an autopsy found a lethal amount of potassium cyanide in his body, Jessie was charged with his murder. At trial, her defense team contended that her husband had killed himself or had ingested the poison accidentally. She was acquitted after a highly publicized trial.

== William J. Costello ==
William J. Costello, a native of Peabody, Massachusetts, had been a member of the city's fire department since 1921. Prior to becoming a firefighter, he had worked in a shoe factory. During World War I he served in the military and had been the victim of a gas attack.

Prior to his death, Costello was believed by friends to be in good health and good spirits, despite being on leave to attend a funeral. However, his wife Jessie contended that her husband had been suffering from heart issues. Her assertion was corroborated by Edward J. McMahon, a reserve police officer and friend of the couple, who stated that Costello had "suffered greatly from indigestion" but "kept his troubles to himself" because "he did not like to deal with doctors or go through an operation." McMahon also stated that Costello was "depressed on some occasions when he was ill".

== Jessie B. Costello ==
Jessie Burnett Costello was born in Yonkers, New York, in 1902 to Andrew and Jessie Fyfe. The family moved to Peabody when Costello was a young girl. She attended Peabody Public Schools and went to high school for one year, but dropped out in 1918 to seek employment while her father was serving in the United States Army. She worked in a bakery, leather factory and corset shop. In 1919, while selling poppies at the Peabody fire station, she met Costello. A courtship started in 1920 and they married on January 28, 1923. She was raised as a Protestant but wed in a Catholic ceremony. She was active in local social and political circles and served as head of the American Legion Auxiliary.

The Costellos had four children (Marie, Jessie, William, and Robert). William Costello Jr. died during infancy.

== Death ==
According to Jessie Costello, William came home from a wake around 2:30 am on February 17, 1933. Soon thereafter he mixed potassium cyanide and oxalic acid in a coffee can so his wife could use it as a cleaning paste. He paced the floor until after 5 am because he did not feel well and went to sleep before 8 am. John J. Costello Sr., the deceased's father who resided in the Costello home, testified that he heard his son go straight to bed and he did not hear him mix the cleaner or pace the floor as Jessie Costello alleged.

Jessie Costello stated that around 9 am, she found her husband still sleeping and called the fire department to inform his co-workers that he was ill and would not attend a funeral. Around 9:15 am, cleaning woman Katherine Simbolest arrived at the Costello home as she did every Friday for the past year. Mrs. Costello informed her that the two would be cleaning the boiler. She brought out a chair and the potassium cyanide and oxalic acid solution in preparation to clean the boiler.

According to Simbolest, a woman selling candy came to the door around 10 am and Costello went upstairs to retrieve her pocketbook. While doing so, Costello found her husband dead at the entrance to the bathroom on the second floor of their home. She informed Simbolest that Costello was dead then began making phone calls. According to Simbolest, she called Marie Purcell and Edward McMahon.

Costello telephoned family physician Dr. Harris Pomeroy, but was unable to reach him. She then called Dr. John F. Walsh. Walsh found Costello's body to be very cold and believed that he had been dead for several hours. He informed medical examiner S. Chase Tucker, who looked over the body and gave permission for an undertaker to remove it. Later that day, Tucker decided to perform an autopsy to determine the cause of death. However, because the body had already been placed in a casket, he decided to wait until after the funeral services were held to perform the autopsy. On February 19, in order to keep the investigation quiet, a false burial ceremony was held at St. Mary's Cemetery. After mourners left the cemetery, the casket was removed from the grave and placed in a vault until it was picked up by Tucker. The following day, district attorney Hugh Cregg tasked two state police detectives with the investigation.

== Investigation ==
Based on his findings, Tucker decided to have Costello's organs further examined. Boston toxicologist Dr. J. Stewart Rooney found that there was enough cyanide in Costello's body to have caused his death. However, he was unable to determine how Costello ingested the poison. Rooney gave Costello's time of death as between 3:15 AM and 5:00 AM.

The purchase of potassium cyanide was unusual and the only recent purchase in Peabody was by Mrs. Costello, who had bought it from a local drug store for what she claimed was cleaning purposes. Costello presented investigators with multiple stories when asked about where she learned that potassium cyanide could be used for cleaning, which were found to be untrue.

Costello hired former Essex County district attorney William G. Clark and William H. O'Brine to represent her. They were later joined by Francis E. Rafter, who took over as chief counsel before trial. Dr. Pomeroy, who was also questioned by investigators, retained attorneys S. Howard Donnell and Bart J. Ronan.

On March 1, 1933, Jessie Costello suffered a nervous breakdown. The following day, Dr. Pomeroy suffered a heart attack and was given a 50% chance of survival. Due to their illnesses, investigators were not allowed to interrogate Costello and Pomeroy any further. Pomeroy remained hospitalized until March 24, but still needed care from nurses. He returned to his practice on April 7.

On March 3, 1933, district attorney Hugh Cregg announced at a press conference that he had "definitely decided" that Costello had been murdered, but no arrests were imminent.

On March 14, 1933, Cregg took the Costello case to a grand jury. On March 17, Costello was indicted for murder and arrested.

On March 22, 1933, Edward J. McMahon admitted to having a four-month affair with Jessie Costello and told a reporter with The Boston Globe that she had once told him that she wanted to kill his wife and her husband and make their deaths look like suicide so the two of them could run off to New Jersey together. He also stated that he had seen Jessie Costello hug and kiss Dr. Pomeroy in the Costello home. On May 5, McMahon told Cregg that he had never told reporters that Jessie Costello wanted to kill their spouses and run away together.

Costello's defense team hired Dr. Alexander Gettler of New York to examine William Costello's body, however judge Frederick W. Fosdick refused to allow the body to leave the state and the defense could not afford to bring him to Massachusetts. Instead, Costello's organs were examined by Dr. Francis P. McCarthy and Dr. J. N. Looney.

== Trial ==
=== Prosecution witnesses ===
Costello's trial began on July 17, 1933. In his opening statement, district attorney Hugh Cregg declined to give a motive, but indicated two possibilities. One was that Bill Costello was angry with his wife over gossip regarding affair with McMahon, the other was that Jessie Costello needed money and wanted to collect on her husband's life insurance.

John J. Costello Sr. testified that he had heard his son and daughter-in-law have an argument about Edward McMahon about six weeks before Costello's death. Dr. Harris Pomeroy testified that while treating Edward McMahon for appendicitis, he had seen Mrs. Costello acting flirtatious towards McMahon. He also stated that William Costello had complained about his marital relations, but this testimony was stricken by Judge Fosdick. Three nurses from J. B. Thomas Hospital testified that Mrs. Costello had stayed in McMahon's room past visiting hours, but had never seen anything improper. Eleanor O’Neil, the Costellos’ babysitter, testified that McMahon was a frequent visitor to the Costello house and she once saw him pull Mrs. Costello onto his lap, but she got up immediately. At Mrs. Costello's request, the defense did not cross-examine the 15-year old babysitter. Eddie McMahon testified that he carried on an affair with her from November 1932 until a week before Bill Costello's death. He contended that although he made the first move, Jessie Costello was the aggressor and pushed to continue the affair after he tried to break it off.

On July 27, 1933, the prosecution began calling expert witnesses. Dr. J. Stewart Rooney testified that he found cyanide in Bill Costello's brain, kidney, and liver tissue by using the Prussian blue test. The stomach contained a "gelatinous substance or mucoid" in Costello's stomach, which suggested the possibility that he had ingested the poison via a gelatin capsule. He tested the potassium cyanide purchased by Jessie Costello by feeding it to two guinea pigs. They both died within two minutes. Rooney also testified that a livid spot on the right side of Costello's chest indicated that he had died while laying on his right side, not on his back as he had been found.

Toxicologist Dr. William F. Boos presented the theory that Costello had been poisoned by a capsule containing potassium cyanide. According to Boos, if Costello ingested such a capsule on an empty stomach, he would have died within 10 minutes. He testified Costello's cause of death was hydrocyanic acid, which formed when potassium cyanide mixed with hydrogen chlorine in the stomach. The small area of irritation on Costello's stomach was also consistent with cyanide and because it had not spread to a larger area indicated that his death was almost immediate.

The government's final planned witness was Samuel Kerr, a life insurance agent who presented a letter from Costello that he received the day before his death which asked for his $3,000 policy to be cashed in and for a $75 loan on his $2,000 policy. The prosecution contended that this letter showed that Costello was not contemplating suicide. The government also admitted the life insurance policies, in which Costello denied having any illnesses or diseases, into evidence.

After Kerr's testimony, Cregg requested a five-minute recess, which stretched to 35 minutes. When court resumed, the government called a surprise witness, George Russell. Earlier that morning Russell, an assistant pharmacist who had not wanted to get involved with the trial, was confronted on the seventh hole of the North Shore Country Club's golf course by Sergeant James Murphy of the Peabody Police Department. Murphy had been told by a mutual acquaintance during a golf game the night before that Russell had sold Jessie Costello capsules. After admitting to making the sale, Murphy brought Russell directly to the courthouse, where, while still dressed in his golf attire, he testified that he had sold Jessie Costello capsules approximately four months before her husband's death. A rebuttal witness, Clara Bisson, testified that Jessie Costello had filled capsules with medicine for her, refuting Costello's claim that she did never done so.

=== Defense's case ===
The defense contended that Costello's death was accidental or a suicide, leaning more heavily on the possibility of suicide. Defense counsel noted that the prosecution's capsule theory worked both ways, because Bill Costello could have administered the capsule himself.

On cross examination, Drs. Pomeroy and Walsh both testified that Costello had health issues. Dr. Pomeroy testified that Costello had visited his office about two weeks before his death and had prescribed him medication for gas and loss of appetite. Dr. Walsh testified that he had given Costello a physical for a veteran's disability pension in 1931 and diagnosed him with chronic stomach trouble (possibly duodenal ulcers), chronic gastritis, and hearing loss.

In addition to his physical ailments, the defense also alleged that Costello had been suffering mentally. Jessie Costello testified that her husband had become morose following the deaths of their son William Jr. and her mother, Jessie Fyfe. He spent much of his time praying in church or at their home in front of a picture of their deceased son or with a crucifix that had been taken from William Jr.'s coffin. He would pray the rosary three to four times a day. She also stated that Bill would have temporary bouts of insanity where he would harm their children, the most recent being an incident where he tried to bludgeon their youngest son with a car jack.

Costello denied having an affair with McMahon or anyone else. According to her, McMahon stayed in the Costello home because her husband pitied his poor financial state and wanted to make sure the McMahon baby was properly taken care of while Mrs. McMahon was in the hospital. She admitted to visiting McMahon in the hospital and driving with him, but contended that she was a frequent visitor to the hospital and that McMahon had dropped her off to run errands while he was borrowing her husband's car.

The defense's medical expert, Alexander Gettler, criticized the prosecution's capsule theory. According to him, if Costello had taken the potassium cyanide orally, 90% of the poison would have been found in his stomach (Rooney and Boos both testified that they did not find any cyanide in Costello's stomach). He stated that the traces of potassium cyanide found in Costello's brain, liver, kidneys, and thigh muscles were consistent with having entered the body through inhalation or could have been the result of putrefaction.

== Verdict ==
On August 15, 1933, after hearing from 67 witnesses who produced 2,200 pages of testimony, the case was turned over to the jury. After about 90 minutes of deliberation, the jury returned a verdict of not guilty.

== Aftermath ==
Following the verdict, Joseph F. Dinneen wrote that the Costello case "takes its place on the shelves along with other famous cases; that of Charles Lewis Tucker and Mabel Page and the case of "Lizzie Borden". It eclipsed both in public interest and sets a new record".

After being released from jail, Costello announced that she planned on remaining in Peabody. Thousands of people visited the city to see the Costello home and the cemetery where William was buried. On August 19, 1933, Boston concert impresario Charles Shribman announced that Costello would appear with various orchestras on a 12-week tour of New England and New York. However, her performing career was thwarted after the communities of Somerset, Salisbury, Marlborough, Revere and Worcester, as well as Old Orchard Branch, Maine, barred her from performing. The Boston licensing board allowed Costello to appear at the Tremont Theatre in connection with a showing of the film The Face on the Barroom Floor, however the theater's owners would not allow her to appear. In October 1933, Costello sang in Aimee Semple McPherson's choir during the preacher's revivals at the Boston Arena. In 1934, Costello was appointed general treasurer of the Sharkey Athletic Association, a boxing club led by former Boston Garden general manager Dick Dunn. In 1936, Costello's home was foreclosed on and she moved to a tenement secured for her by Peabody's commissioner of soldier's aid. Jessie Costello died in 1971.

On August 18, 1933, William J. Costello's death certificate was filed by medical examiner S. Chase Tucker. The cause of death was listed as "poisoning by cyanide potassium" but did not state if the death was a homicide, suicide, or accident. Costello's $1,000 life insurance policy was paid out to his father, which led Jessie Costello to sue her father-in-law. The court ruled in favor of John Costello and the decision was upheld by an appellate court.

In 1935, J. Stewart Rooney sued Essex County for $2,040 he claimed was owed to him for his work on the Costello case. On November 27, 1935, a judge ruled against Rooney because he failed to obtain a certificate from the district attorney declaring that his services were necessary at trial. The decision was upheld by the Massachusetts Supreme Judicial Court in 1937.

On January 4, 1935, Edward McMahon resigned from the Peabody Police Department under pressure from Mayor J. Leo Sullivan.

One of the Costello children, Robert, served as Peabody's police chief from 1974 until his death in 1985.

== See also ==
- List of unsolved deaths
