= Robert R. Fears =

American politician

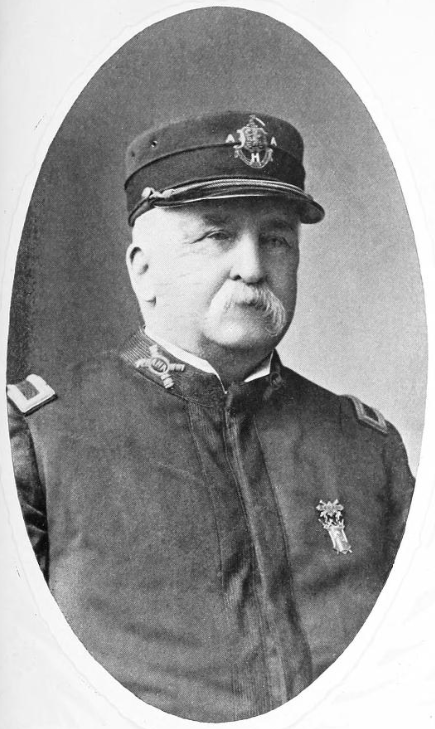

Mayor of Gloucester, Massachusetts
- In office 1874–1877
- Preceded by: First
- Succeeded by: Allan Rogers

Personal details
- Born: 1830 Gloucester, Massachusetts
- Died: May 17, 1914 (aged 84) Gloucester, Massachusetts
- Party: Democratic
- Occupation: Sailmaker; Real Estate; Insurance

Robert R. Fears (1830–1914) was an American politician who served as the first Mayor of Gloucester, Massachusetts.

== Early life ==
Fears was born in Gloucester in 1830. As a young man he worked in the sail making business with his father and was a member of the state militia.

== Political career ==
Fears served on the Gloucester Board of Selectmen from 1872 to 1874. One February 20, 1873, a special town meeting voted 394 to 48 to petition the Massachusetts General Court for a city charter. Fears was chosen to serve on the committee tasked with drawing up the new charter. The charter was adopted at a May 15, 1873, town meeting 689 to 353.

Gloucester switched to a city form of government in 1874 and Fears ran for mayor. He was the Democratic nominee and defeated Republican Addison Gilbert 1,095 votes to 698. He was reelected without opposition in 1875. He was defeated in 1876 by Republican Allan Rogers 1,128 to 777. Fears later served on Gloucester's School Committee for many years.

== Business career and death ==
In 1884, Fears began a career in real estate and insurance. He was the president of the Cape Ann Savings Bank for 25 years and a director of the Gloucester Safe Deposit and Trust Company.

Fears died on May 17, 1914, at his home in Gloucester.
