= George Garland (photographer) =

English photographer

George Garland (1900–1978) was a photographer known for his images of rural crafts and craftsmen taken in rural West Sussex.

He was born in Brighton but moved to Petworth with his mother in 1907. He attended Midhurst Grammar School, and worked for a short time in a bank in Hampshire before returning to Petworth in about 1922.

Garland did not set out to become a photographer. In the 1920s, he tried his hand at freelance journalism and found that his pieces sold better if they were accompanied by a photograph. In January 1922, Garland took a photograph of a lorry accident at Coultershaw which was published in the London Evening News; this brought financial reward and reached a wide audience, encouraging Garland to take up photography as a profession. Petworth had not had a resident photographer since 1908 when Walter Kevis retired and left the town.

At a time when demand for studio portraits was declining, Garland specialised in photographs of rustic characters, hunting scenes and farming landscapes for newspapers and periodicals, mostly taken around Petworth or Amberley. Apart from portraits of notable personalities such as the artist Ivon Hitchens, his practice included also reproductions of artwork.

"It was in his awareness of what was passing and what was transient that his genius lay. He captured on glass the varied but threatened world of the old ways of agriculture, or the dying rustic crafts or the now extinct breed of Sussex characters."

== Writing ==
Garland wrote articles of local interest for a Sussex newspaper using the pen name ‘Nomad’. His manuscript ‘Tales of Old Petworth’, recalling Petworth before photography, encouraged illustrator Jonathan Newdick and Peter Jerrome to create Window Press to publish it in 1976, two years before George Garland died.

== Postcards ==
Garland published few postcards, mainly of Petworth and Fittleworth, sometimes stamped on the back in blue ink "G.G. Garland, Petworth" or "George G. Garland, Photographer, Petworth". These mostly recorded local events like fairs and football matches.

== Garland archive ==
His photographs of rural crafts and craftsmen were reproduced as prints. Nearly 70,000 of Garland's negatives from over 50 years are preserved by West Sussex Record Office in the Garland Collection.

Photographic prints attributed to Garland are also held in the Conway Library at the Courtauld Institute of Art.

== Garland photographs ==
- Not submitted elsewhere - photographs from the 1920s, George Garland Window Press (1980)
- Proud Petworth and Beyond - pictures from 1922-1936, Window Press (1981)
- Petworth, time out of mind, Window Press (1982)
- Petworth, the winds of change, Window Press (1983)
- The men with laughter in their hearts - photographs from the 1930s by George Garland, Window Press (1986)
- Old & new, teasing & true - photographs from the '20s and '30s by George Garland, Window Press (1988)

== The Garland Archive in context ==
- 1499 images in West Sussex County Council online archive
- published photography collections from various eras
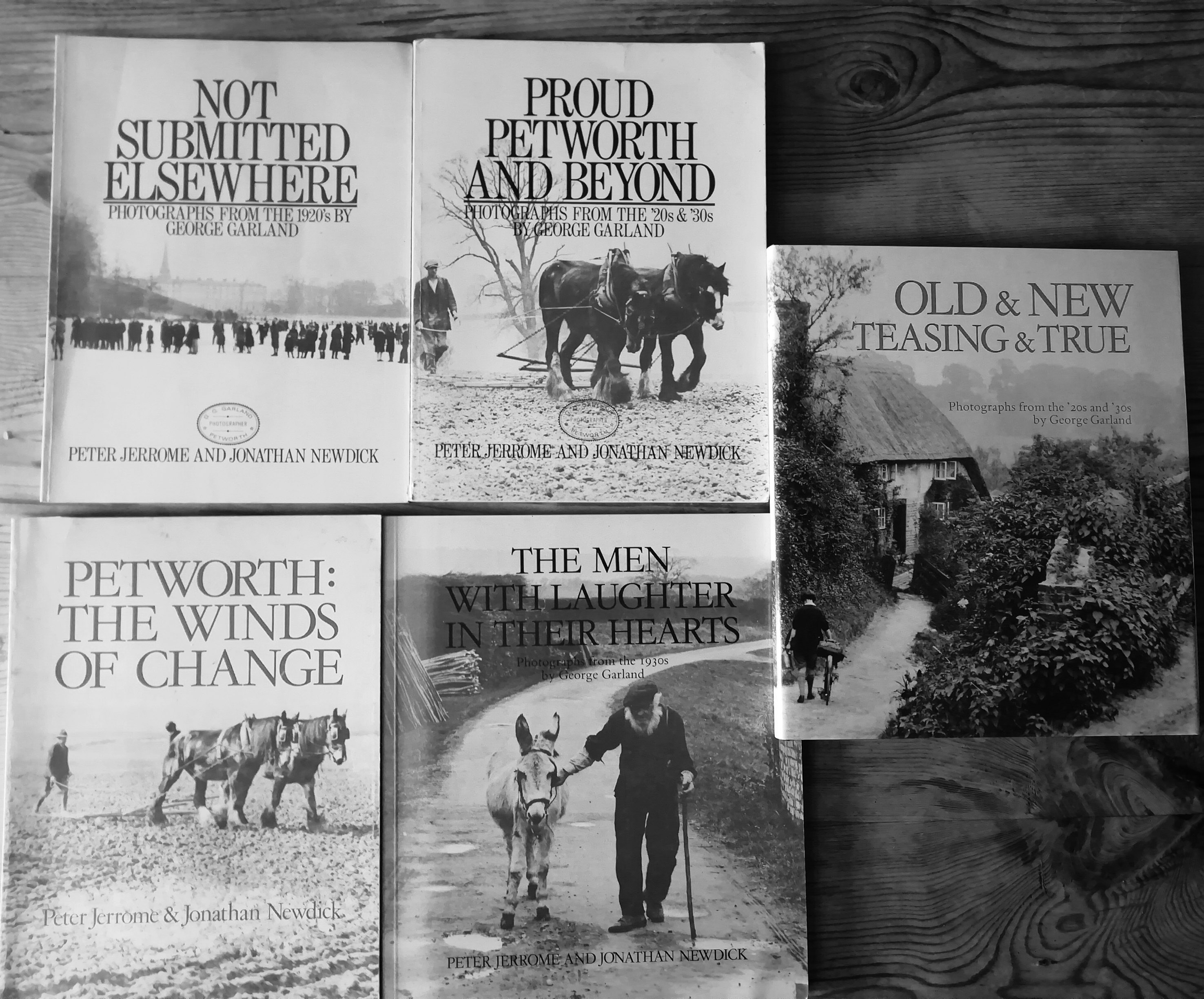
  Window Press publications of the archive of a historic Petworth artist/photographer
- Numbered Portraits - George Garland cur. Val Williams pub. Photoworks (1996) ISBN 0-9517427-5-2 invited artists Joachim Schmid, Chris Harrison and Susan Lipper to respond to WSRO George Garland Collection portraits; taken from thousands of photographs from his studio in Petworth of the rural England that he knew would soon disappear.
- THE STORY OF THE HOME FRONT IN WEST SUSSEX 1939-1945, West Sussex Record Office (2012)
