= Benjamin F. Cook =

American military officer and politician (1833–1915)

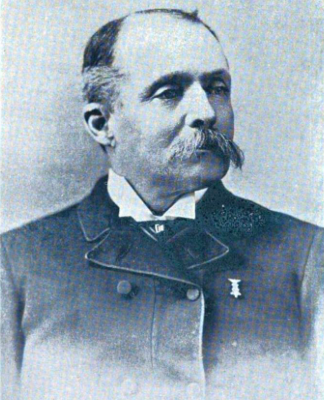

Mayor of Gloucester, Massachusetts
- In office 1894–1896
- Preceded by: Asa G. Andrews
- Succeeded by: David I. Robinson
- In office 1897–1898
- Preceded by: David I. Robinson
- Succeeded by: Frank E. Davis

Member of the Massachusetts Senate from the Third Essex District
- In office 1887–1889
- Preceded by: William H. Tappan
- Succeeded by: Aaron Low

Personal details
- Born: January 1, 1833 Boston, Massachusetts, U.S.
- Died: September 3, 1915 (aged 82) Gloucester, Massachusetts, U.S.
- Party: Republican
- Spouse: Julia F. Friend (m. 1865; died 1868) Eva Leach (m. 1869)
- Children: 5

Benjamin Franklin Cook (January 1, 1833 – September 3, 1915) was an American military officer who served with the Union Army during the American Civil War. He later served three terms as mayor of Gloucester, Massachusetts.

== Early life ==
Cook was born in Boston, on January 1, 1833, to Jeremiah R. and Harriet (Tarr) Cook. His mother was a descendant of colonial military officer Benjamin Church. His father worked in the glass business in Boston and was a captain in the Massachusetts state militia. In 1839, the family moved to Gloucester. Cook attended Gloucester public schools, then worked in the paint and oil business. In 1851, he became a member of the state militia.

== Civil War ==
Cook enlisted in the 12th Massachusetts Infantry Regiment on April 19, 1861. He was mustered in as First Lieutenant on June 26, 1861 and promoted to captain on May 2, 1862. Following the death of commander Fletcher Webster at the Second Battle of Bull Run, Cook was the only officer in his regiment who was not killed or wounded. At the Battle of Antietam, Cook was placed in command of the skirmish line. All of the other officers who were present at the battle were either killed or wounded, so Cook was forced to assume command of the regiment. The casualties received by the 12th Massachusetts Infantry, 67%, were the highest of any unit that day. Cook also saw action at Cedar Mountain, Thoroughfare Gap, South Mountain, Fredericksburg, Chantilly, Chancellorsville, Gettysburg, and Mine Run as well as 21 battles during the Overland Campaign.

From January to September 1863, Cook was the provost marshal of the Second Division of the I Corps. He was commissioned as a Major on July 23, 1863 and promoted to Lieutenant Colonel on May 6, 1864. His final assignment was serving on the examining board for the transfer of men from the Army to the Navy. He was discharged on July 8, 1864.

== Government service ==
After the War, Cook spent most of his career working at the Gloucester Custom House. He was a member of the Massachusetts House of Representatives during the 1868 and 1869 Massachusetts legislatures and was a member of the Massachusetts Senate in 1887, 1888, and 1889. He was mayor of Gloucester in 1894 and 1895, and 1897.

== Personal life ==
Cook was married to Julia F. Friend from 1865 until her death in 1868. In 1869, he married Eva Leach, with whom he had five children that survived him. Cook died on September 3, 1915 after a long illness.
