= Jonathan Newdick =

English artist (born 1948)

Jonathan Newdick (born 1948) is an artist and writer born in Newbury, who was brought up in the rural South of England. His work references trees, buildings and the land; drawings about rather than of things.

== Career ==
In 1971 after graduating from The West Sussex College of Art he was employed as a designer in Fleet Street, but left London and returned to Sussex, where he worked as a typographer and then book designer. He was also a visiting lecturer at Kingston University, alongside working as a designer of books and magazines, while continuing, unfashionably, to draw landscapes. His diverse work ethic led to a Spanish network television documentary production in the early 1980s. In 1990 he was awarded a master's degree in the Cultural and Critical Theory of British Art from the University of Sussex after which he turned from designing to drawing and printmaking. He was the Artist in Residence at Petworth House for the National Trust in the late 1990s, where he spent a year on the estate, often working on large-scale pieces in the fields.

In 2009 he published The Red Handkerchief / Il Fazzoletto Rosso and Thirty Very Short Stories about which Estelle Sosland, then Chair of the Trustees of the Nelson Atkins Museum of Art in Kansas City wrote: '[Newdick] is doing something that is not just unique but creates a significant innovation for the arts.'

In 2011, he began work on a set of pencil drawings which can be seen as a continuation of the Recording Britain scheme of the Second World War, documenting barns and farm buildings of the Leconfield Estate in West Sussex which appeared to be under threat from development. His work has been exhibited as part of public collections in properties owned by the National Trust. In 2022 he began working with the Turkish pianist Lara Melda, interpreting her Chopin nocturnes as a set of graphite transfer monoprints.

Kevis House Gallery in Petworth has a selection of Newdick's work for sale. Other than this he shuns publicity, has no website, and rejects all social media. It has been said that if he thinks he has any sort of light he will 'spend the rest of the day searching for a bushel'.

== Collaborations ==
He set up The Window Press as designer and publisher in conjunction with historian Peter Jerrome to publish a manuscript by photographer George Garland in 1976, recalling Petworth before photography.

== Publications ==
- The Complete Freshwater Fishes Of The British Isles. Newdick, J. (1979) Published by A & C Black, London
- Not Submitted Elsewhere: Photographs from the 1920s by George Garland by Peter Jerrome and Jonathan Newdick, published 1980 (94 pp., Petworth: The Window Press)
- Proud Petworth and Beyond: Photographs from the '20s & '30s By George Garland by Peter Jerrome and Jonathan Newdick, published 1981 (150 pp., Petworth: The Window Press)
- Petworth: Time Out of Mind by Peter Jerrome and Jonathan Newdick, published 1982 (159 pp., 200 illus., Petworth: The Window Press)
- Petworth: The Winds of Change by Peter Jerrome and Jonathan Newdick, published 1983 (160 pp., Petworth: The Window Press)
- Men with Laughter in their Hearts: Photographs from the 1930S by George Garland by Peter Jerrome and Jonathan Newdick, published 1986 (Petworth: The Window Press)
- Old and New, Teasing and True: Photographs by George Garland 1922-39 by Peter Jerrome and Jonathan Newdick, published 1988 (Petworth: The Window Press)
- Out of Time? (2012) Privately printed. ISBN 9780957240407
