= George Garland (New Zealand politician) =

New Zealand politician

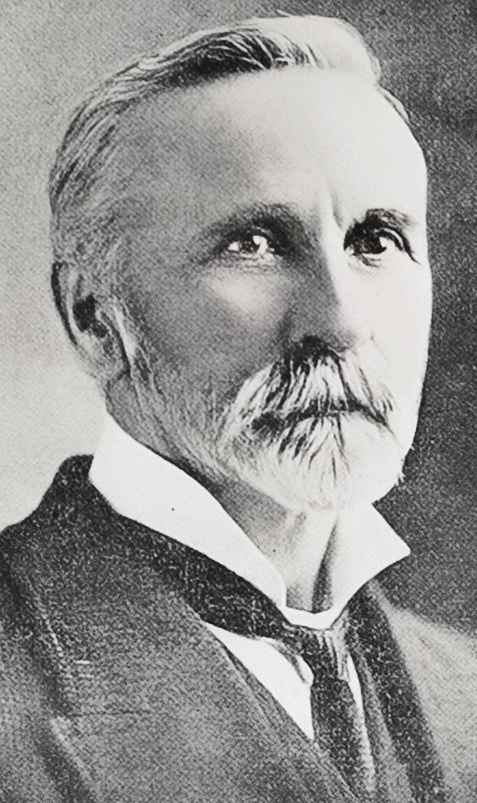
Garland, c. 1918

George Joseph Garland (1856 – 25 August 1950) was a member of the New Zealand Legislative Council from 1918 to 1932; he was appointed by the Reform Government.

== Early life and career ==
Garland was born in 1856 in Bridgnorth in Shropshire, England. His parents, Henry and Elizabeth, decided to emigrate to New Zealand and with seven children, they arrived in Auckland on the African on 28 January 1860. After his schooling, he went to sea for seven or eight years. He then took over his father's farm in Āwhitu; he retired from farming in 1898. He then became a land and estate agent in Auckland.

== Local government and politics ==
Garland was a member of many organisations. He chaired the local road board for the area where he had been farming. He was chairman of the school committee. He was a member of the Hospital and Charitable Aid board. He was for some years chairman of the Auckland Education Board. He was a member of the Grey Lynn Borough Council for seven years and for some of that time, he was the deputy mayor. When Grey Lynn Borough was absorbed into Auckland City in 1914, Garland became a member of Auckland City Council for two years. For the New Zealand Farmers Union, he was the first secretary for its dominion executive. He was the first dominion secretary for the Reform Party. He was on the board of Auckland Grammar School and on the council of Auckland College.

He was a member of the New Zealand Legislative Council from 7 May 1918 to 6 May 1925; then 7 May 1925 to 6 May 1932, when his term ended. He was appointed by the Reform Government.

== Personal life ==
Garland was married to Sarah Garland, who died on 12 December 1933. At the time, the Garlands were living in Yates Road in Māngere East. He died in hospital on 25 August 1950 aged 94.
