= Joseph Garland (mayor) =

American doctor and politician

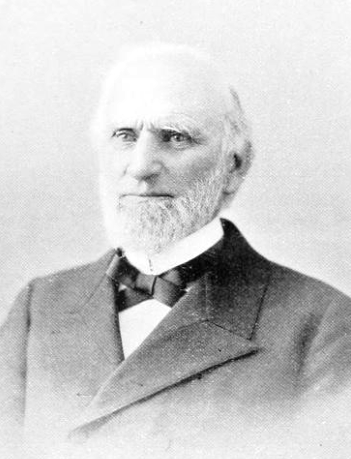

Mayor of Gloucester, Massachusetts
- In office 1880–1882
- Preceded by: William Williams
- Succeeded by: William Williams

Personal details
- Born: January 22, 1822 Hampton, New Hampshire
- Died: September 4, 1902 (aged 80) Gloucester, Massachusetts
- Party: Republican
- Spouses: Caroline A. Goodhue (m. 1849; died 1868) Susan D. Knowlton (m. 1870)
- Education: Bowdoin College; Jefferson Medical College
- Occupation: Teacher; Physician; Surgeon

Joseph Garland (1822–1902) was an American medical doctor and politician who served as Mayor of Gloucester, Massachusetts.

== Early life and education ==
Garland was born on January 22, 1822, in Hampton, New Hampshire. After graduating from the New Hampton School, he worked as a teacher. In 1840 he entered Dartmouth College, but left after one year and returned to teaching. Garland went back to college in 1842 and graduated from Bowdoin College in 1844. After graduating, Garland taught for one year at the South Hampton Academy and then taught at the Atkinson Academy for one year. In 1848 he attended the chemical studies program at Massachusetts General Hospital and in 1849 graduated from Jefferson Medical College. While studying medicine, Garland also taught at two private academies.

== Medical career ==
In May 1849, Garland moved to Gloucester, Massachusetts, where he established a medical practice, worked as a teacher, and served on the School Committee. In 1879 he was elected president of the Essex South Medical Society.

== Mayor ==
In 1879, Garland was the Republican nominee for Mayor of Gloucester. He defeated incumbent Mayor William Williams 1,260 votes to 954. It was Garland's first run for public office. He was reelected without opposition in 1880, but did not run for reelection in 1881.

== Personal life and death ==
On October 17, 1849, Garland married Caroline A. Goodhue. They had three sons, two of whom predeceased him. Caroline Garland died in 1868. On May 3, 1870, Garland married Susan D. Knowlton. They had two sons and two daughters.

Garland continued to practice medicine in Gloucester until his death on September 4, 1902.
