= 1943–1944 Massachusetts legislature =

153rd Massachusetts General Court
←	152nd	154th	→

Overview
- Legislative body: General Court

Senate
- Members: 40

House
- Members: 240

The 153rd Massachusetts General Court, consisting of the Massachusetts Senate and the Massachusetts House of Representatives, met in 1943 and 1944.

== Senators ==
Portrait	Name	Date of birth	District
	Benjamin J. Bowen	January 19, 1876	
	Richard S. Bowers	June 18, 1900	
	Ralph Vester Clampit	March 28, 1896	1st Hampden
	William R. Conley	September 1, 1900	
	Arthur W. Coolidge	October 13, 1881	
	Michael A. Flanagan	February 21, 1890	
	Joseph F. Francis	July 2, 1893	
	Richard I. Furbush	January 4, 1904	
	Eugene H. Giroux	January 20, 1903	
	Maurice M. Goldman		
	William Patrick Grant	November 5, 1904	
	James A. Gunn	June 7, 1883	
	Cornelius F. Haley	July 15, 1875	
	Charles V. Hogan	April 12, 1897	
	Newland H. Holmes	August 30, 1891	
	J. Frank Hughes		
	Jarvis Hunt (politician)	March 28, 1904	
	Charles John Innes	June 1, 1901	
	Thomas H. Johnston	March 5, 1872	
	Robert L. Lee		
	Harold R. Lundgren	May 22, 1894	
	Donald Alexander MacDonald	February 21, 1893	
	John D. Mackay	April 7, 1872	
	James P. McAndrews		
	Charles Gardner Miles	December 2, 1879	
	Joseph F. Montminy		
	Joseph L. Murphy	January 25, 1907	
	Donald W. Nicholson	August 11, 1888	
	William E. Nolen		
	Charles William Olson	August 24, 1889	
	James Austin Peckham		
	Benjamin B. Priest		
	Harris S. Richardson	January 10, 1887	
	Edward Rowe	March 17, 1902	
	George W. Stanton		
	Everett W. Stone		
	Charles F. Sullivan	October 10, 1904	
	Leo J. Sullivan	December 8, 1905	
	Sumner G. Whittier	July 4, 1911	

== Representatives ==
Portrait	Name	Date of birth	District
	Wilfred J. Achin	May 12, 1891	3rd Berkshire
	Richard James Allen	June 22, 1909	
	Theodore Andrews	August 23, 1893	
	John A. Armstrong	June 12, 1901	
	Charles J. Artesani		
	Edward C. Ashworth	April 22, 1899	
	William F. Askin	May 6, 1896	
	Josiah Babcock Jr.	May 21, 1880	
	Earle S. Bagley	January 20, 1905	
	Willis L. Baker	June 25, 1875	
	Charles Homer Barrett	June 23, 1868	
	George L. Barrus	December 15, 1880	
	William R. Barry	February 2, 1905	
	Michael J. Batal	September 8, 1898	
	Walter Ray Baylies	April 28, 1902	
	Alfred M. Bessette	March 25, 1876	
	Rodolphe G. Bessette	September 14, 1911	
	Albert F. Bigelow	October 4, 1880	10th Norfolk
	Fred Arthur Blake	January 13, 1895	
	Stanley John Borsa		
	Everett Murray Bowker	September 17, 1901	
	Daniel Joseph Bresnahan	September 30, 1888	
	Clarence B. Brown	December 22, 1877	
	Frank Eben Brown	January 14, 1890	
	John D. Brown	January 30, 1900	
	Russell P. Brown	August 24, 1891	
	William Albert Brown	February 5, 1888	
	Archie Edward Bruce	August 20, 1883	
	Harland Burke	April 22, 1888	
	Edward Butterworth	August 14, 1908	
	Bartholomew John Callery Jr.	March 28, 1910	
	Colin James Cameron	August 24, 1879	
	Charles J. Campbell	September 28, 1877	
	Robert Patterson Campbell	December 20, 1887	
	Matthew J. Capeless	June 4, 1875	
	Edmund Euplio Capodilupo	July 7, 1913	
	Enrico Cappucci	1910	
	Ernest Westervelt Carman		
	John Henry Carroll		
	Daniel Casey	May 7, 1890	
	William J. Casey (Massachusetts politician)	June 27, 1905	
	James Frederick Catusi		
	Frank H. Chambers	June 14, 1898	
	Perlie Dyar Chase	July 31, 1905	
	David M. Cleary	May 9, 1901	
	J. Everett Collins	April 27, 1894	
	Robert Gerard Connolly	September 11, 1916	
	Michael John Conway		
	Florence E. Cook	July 8, 1908	
	Charles H. Cooke	May 13, 1878	
	George Chauncey Cousens	September 20, 1905	
	Earl Gustavus Crockett	March 23, 1894	
	Nelson B. Crosby	June 20, 1871	
	Jeremiah Dickson Crowley	May 16, 1911	
	Walter A. Cuffe	January 29, 1898	
	Clifford Rudolph Cusson	January 6, 1895	
	Leslie Bradley Cutler	March 24, 1890	
	Lawrence Harvard Davis		
	John Joseph Deedy	September 22, 1914	
	Roger Dennett	September 14, 1895	
	Ernest DeRoy	July 13, 1889	
	Octave O. Desmarais	October 26, 1889	
	Cornelius Desmond	October 4, 1893	
	Burt Dewar	December 29, 1884	
	Logan Rockwell Dickie	May 4, 1890	
	Vincent B. Dignam	February 22, 1896	
	Jacinto F. Diniz	October 3, 1888	
	Edmond J. Donlan	December 19, 1899	
	Susan Bradley Donovan	October 2, 1895	
	Joseph William Dooley	October 25, 1904	
	Anthony R. Doyle	August 8, 1895	
	Charles D. Driscoll	June 18, 1888	
	Henry M. Duggan	October 5, 1896	
	Ernest W. Dullea	January 14, 1891	
	Clifton Emerson Dwelly	January 11, 1893	
	Henry Allen Ellis	November 5, 1879	
	Charles Kingsbury Endicott	October 4, 1892	
	Sven August Erickson	December 9, 1875	
	George Jelly Evans	February 4, 1909	
	Samuel Falkof		
	Catherine E. Falvey	November 6, 1910	
	John J. Falvey	February 22, 1904	
	John R. Fausey	March 19, 1870	
	Michael Paul Feeney	March 26, 1907	
	Charles E. Ferguson	January 30, 1894	
	Joseph P. Ferriter	March 25, 1905	
	John Edward Flaherty	December 31, 1910	
	William Daniel Fleming	April 14, 1907	
	Norman Eugene Folsom	December 23, 1903	
	John F. Foster		
	Douglass Brooks Francis		
	George Fuller	July 24, 1893	
	Dana Taylor Gallup	April 14, 1885	
	Charles Gibbons	July 21, 1901	
	Avery W. Gilkerson	June 5, 1899	
	John F. Gilmore	December 8, 1896	
	Dennis P. Glynn	September 29, 1906	
	Hollis M. Gott	May 25, 1885	
	Thomas T. Gray	July 22, 1892	
	George Greene	March 7, 1897	
	Edward J. Grimley	December 15, 1915	
	Frederick C. Haigis	May 10, 1903	
	Edward Childs Hall	May 12, 1870	
	Fred C. Harrington	April 21, 1902	
	Frederick Roy Harvey Jr.		
	Charles Howard Haskell	July 26, 1878	
	Lawrence Alanson Haworth	May 23, 1871	
	William E. Hays	November 28, 1903	
	Henry Davis Higgins	February 24, 1873	
	Ralph H. Hill	February 5, 1915	
	Charles F. Holman	June 21, 1892	
	Frank Hathaway Horton	July 15, 1874	
	J. Philip Howard	February 16, 1907	
	I. Grafton Howes	June 17, 1889	
	Orison Valentine Hull	November 9, 1873	
	Richard Lester Hull	November 30, 1917	
	Edward A. Hutchinson Jr.	December 13, 1911	
	Fred A. Hutchinson	April 5, 1881	
	William McEwen Hyde	January 27, 1910	
	Harvey Iris		
	Adolph Johnson	July 20, 1885	
	Ernest A. Johnson	March 13, 1897	
	Peter John Jordan	July 23, 1910	
	Charles Kaplan	September 26, 1895	
	Alfred B. Keith	November 26, 1893	
	Charles A. Kelley	March 24, 1862	
	Francis Joseph Kelley	March 21, 1890	
	Richard A. Kelly	August 7, 1905	
	Rudolph King	November 2, 1887	
	Allan Roy Kingston	November 23, 1901	
	John Quincy Knowles	May 21, 1895	
	David Benjamin Lane Jr.	September 6, 1906	
	George Thomas Lanigan	January 4, 1909	
	Laurence W. Law		
	Walter E. Lawrence	December 8, 1905	
	Ralph Lerche	August 19, 1899	
	Louis Lobel	August 10, 1911	
	Burton Elmer Loring		
	William Christopher Lunney	December 24, 1910	
	Edward Lysek	October 18, 1911	
	Arthur Ulton Mahan	June 18, 1900	
	Ralph Collins Mahar	January 4, 1912	
	Vincent Ambrose Mannering	July 11, 1912	
	Joseph Margolis	September 28, 1908	
	Philip M. Markley	March 28, 1897	
	Thomas B. Matthews	June 24, 1874	
	Harry P. McAllister	April 25, 1880	
	Charles Joseph McCaffrey	January 16, 1898	
	Michael J. McCarthy (politician)	October 23, 1890	
	Paul Andrew McCarthy	December 23, 1902	
	Paul J. McCarty	July 22, 1906	
	Elmer L. McCulloch		
	William P. McDermott	July 4, 1870	
	Patrick J. McDonough	April 29, 1911	
	Harold B. L. McIntosh	November 19, 1907	
	Philip McMorrow		
	Joseph A. Milano	April 8, 1883	
	Charles Miller	January 12, 1908	
	Arthur William Milne	March 28, 1908	
	Walter James Moran	December 22, 1903	
	Timothy J. Moriarty	August 6, 1909	
	Lester Bertram Morley	April 19, 1903	
	Edward J. Mulligan	February 8, 1907	
	Robert F. Murphy (politician)	January 24, 1899	
	Cornelius Joseph Murray	August 19, 1890	
	Michael J. Neville	October 19, 1899	
	James Anthony O'Brien	October 27, 1886	
	William Thomas O'Brien	December 2, 1889	
	Roderick L. O'Handly		
	Louis F. O'Keefe	June 12, 1895	
	Tip O'Neill	December 9, 1912	
	George Joseph O'Shea	November 16, 1899	
	John Thomas Padden	May 6, 1903	
	Raymond P. Palmer	December 27, 1895	
	Clark Brownson Partridge	August 26, 1878	
	Loomis Patrick	May 4, 1907	
	Oscar Houston Perkins	January 3, 1879	
	Herman Peter Peterson	November 21, 1890	
	Frederick Everett Pierce	May 5, 1862	
	Sam G. Pillsbury	March 7, 1873	
	George Perry Ponte	May 24, 1905	
	George William Porter	November 6, 1885	
	Harvey Armand Pothier	September 6, 1901	
	John E. Powers	November 10, 1910	
	William Eben Ramsdell	May 4, 1895	
	Stuart Craig Rand	June 9, 1888	
	George E. Rawson	December 6, 1886	
	Cornelius Edward Reddy	May 27, 1910	
	Thomas Francis Reilly	August 12, 1903	
	Joseph N. Roach	March 22, 1883	
	Albert E. Roberts	November 22, 1875	
	William H. J. Rowan	June 21, 1879	
	Gerald F. Scally	July 17, 1905	
	Alyce Louise Schlapp	November 30, 1912	
	William Henry Sears Jr.	July 14, 1875	
	A. John Serino	March 13, 1906	
	William J. Sessions	December 18, 1859	
	Henry Lee Shattuck	October 12, 1879	
	Arthur Joseph Sheehan	March 16, 1897	
	Charles E. Shepard	September 21, 1901	
	Carl A. Sheridan	March 24, 1908	
	Robert T. Sisson	February 21, 1881	
	Michael F. Skerry	January 3, 1909	
	Charles J. Skladzien		
	Roy C. Smith	January 28, 1890	
	H. Edward Snow	April 25, 1914	
	Margaret Spear	August 10, 1882	
	Edward William Staves	May 9, 1887	
	Avery W. Steele	August 1, 1907	
	George Ward Stetson	May 31, 1902	
	Daniel Francis Sullivan	February 15, 1904	
	Jeremiah Joseph Sullivan	March 9, 1905	
	Patrick Gilbert Sullivan	November 18, 1904	
	William F. Sullivan	August 26, 1905	
	Eugene Joseph Sweeney	May 11, 1886	
	Joseph James Sweeney	January 5, 1893	
	Joseph A. Sylvia Jr.	September 16, 1903	
	Edmond Talbot Jr.	June 1, 1898	
	John H. Taylor	1873	
	Robert Leroy Taylor	November 22, 1907	
	Clarence F. Telford		
	Nathaniel Tilden	November 3, 1903	
	James Francis Tobin	May 8, 1903	
	Harold Tompkins	August 23, 1887	
	John Joseph Toomey	March 25, 1909	
	John E. Troy Jr.		
	John H. Valentine	July 21, 1896	
	John W. Vaughan	March 20, 1878	
	Arthur F. Verney		
	James T. Violette		
	William X. Wall	July 1, 1904	
	George Thomas Walsh	February 20, 1904	
	Norman F. Wellen		
	Joseph L. Whiton		
	Frederick Willis (American politician)	May 18, 1904	
	Henry D. Winslow	September 24, 1910	
	Stanislaus George Wondolowski	August 20, 1909	
	Clarence A. Wood		
	Arthur Eaton Young		
	Arthur Lincoln Youngman		

== See also ==
- 1944 Massachusetts gubernatorial election
- 78th United States Congress
- List of Massachusetts General Courts
