= 1941–1942 Massachusetts legislature =

152nd Massachusetts General Court
←	151st	153rd	→

Overview
- Legislative body: General Court

Senate
- Members: 40

House
- Members: 240

The 152nd Massachusetts General Court, consisting of the Massachusetts Senate and the Massachusetts House of Representatives, met in 1941 and 1942.

== Senators ==
Portrait	Name	Date of birth	District
	Frank David Babcock	August 16, 1877	4th Essex
	Arthur Franklin Blanchard	January 27, 1883	
	Richard S. Bowers	June 18, 1900	
	David M. Brackman	September 16, 1900	6th Suffolk
	Patrick Eugene Casey	September 24, 1886	
	Louis Benedict Connors		
	Arthur W. Coolidge	October 13, 1881	
	Laurence Curtis	September 3, 1893	
	Chester A. Dolan Jr.	September 20, 1907	
	Joseph F. Francis	July 2, 1893	
	Eugene H. Giroux	January 20, 1903	
	Angier Goodwin	January 30, 1881	
	William Patrick Grant	November 5, 1904	
	James A. Gunn	June 7, 1883	
	Cornelius F. Haley	July 15, 1875	
	Joseph B. Harrington		
	Charles V. Hogan	April 12, 1897	
	Arthur W. Hollis	April 29, 1877	
	Newland H. Holmes	August 30, 1891	
	Jarvis Hunt (politician)	March 28, 1904	
	Thomas H. Johnston	March 5, 1872	
	George W. Krapf		
	Thomas J. Lane	July 6, 1898	
	Robert L. Lee		
	Harold R. Lundgren	May 22, 1894	
	Donald Alexander MacDonald	February 21, 1893	
	John D. Mackay	April 7, 1872	
	Charles Gardner Miles	December 2, 1879	
	Joseph F. Montminy		
	Joseph L. Murphy	January 25, 1907	
	Donald W. Nicholson	August 11, 1888	
	William E. Nolen		
	Charles William Olson	August 24, 1889	
	Tycho Mouritz Petersen	August 29, 1892	
	Harris S. Richardson	January 10, 1887	
	Mason Sears	December 29, 1899	
	George W. Stanton		
	Charles F. Sullivan	October 10, 1904	
	Leo J. Sullivan	December 8, 1905	
	Bernard Lucian Sullivan		

== Representatives ==
Portrait	Name	Date of birth	District
	William A. Akeroyd	October 24, 1883	3rd Berkshire
	Theodore Andrews	August 23, 1893	
	Charles J. Artesani		
	William F. Askin	May 6, 1896	
	Samuel Greenleaf Atkinson		
	Josiah Babcock Jr.	May 21, 1880	
	Robert S. Backus		
	Walter Granville Baker		
	William A. Baldwin	January 18, 1874	
	Henry D. Barbadoro		
	Philip Barnet	December 2, 1892	
	George L. Barrus	December 15, 1880	
	Thomas A. Barry	May 12, 1895	
	Michael J. Batal	September 8, 1898	
	Walter Ray Baylies	April 28, 1902	
	Albert Bergeron	June 28, 1877	
	Alfred M. Bessette	March 25, 1876	
	Rodolphe G. Bessette	September 14, 1911	
	Albert F. Bigelow	October 4, 1880	10th Norfolk
	Fred Arthur Blake	January 13, 1895	
	Stanley John Borsa		
	Daniel Joseph Bresnahan	September 30, 1888	
	J. Kenney Brooks		
	Russell P. Brown	August 24, 1891	
	Clarence B. Brown	December 22, 1877	
	Frank Eben Brown	January 14, 1890	
	William Albert Brown	February 5, 1888	
	Archie Edward Bruce	August 20, 1883	
	Arthur I. Burgess	October 13, 1894	
	Harland Burke	April 22, 1888	
	Everett E. Callahan		
	George James Callahan		
	Colin James Cameron	August 24, 1879	
	Charles J. Campbell	September 28, 1877	
	Robert Patterson Campbell	December 20, 1887	
	Edmund Euplio Capodilupo	July 7, 1913	
	Enrico Cappucci	1910	
	Fred Carpenter		
	John Henry Carroll		
	John M. Cawley		
	Perlie Dyar Chase	July 31, 1905	
	Ralph Vester Clampit	March 28, 1896	
	William G. Clark Jr.	May 6, 1912	
	Frank Clarkson	June 21, 1877	
	Andrew J. Coakley	November 6, 1906	
	Clarence C. Colby		
	J. Everett Collins	April 27, 1894	
	Michael John Conway		
	Milton Cook		
	Charles H. Cooke	May 13, 1878	
	George Chauncey Cousens	September 20, 1905	
	Thomas F. Coyne		
	Earl Gustavus Crockett	March 23, 1894	
	Nelson B. Crosby	June 20, 1871	
	Jeremiah Dickson Crowley	May 16, 1911	
	Walter A. Cuffe	January 29, 1898	
	Clifford Rudolph Cusson	January 6, 1895	
	Leslie Bradley Cutler	March 24, 1890	
	Lawrence Harvard Davis		
	Hiram Nichols Dearborn	December 21, 1867	
	John Joseph Deedy	September 22, 1914	
	Roger Dennett	September 14, 1895	
	Cornelius Desmond	October 4, 1893	
	Vincent B. Dignam	February 22, 1896	
	Fred Belding Dole	January 23, 1895	
	Edmond J. Donlan	December 19, 1899	
	Susan Bradley Donovan	October 2, 1895	
	Joseph William Dooley	October 25, 1904	
	Joseph H. Downey	December 6, 1890	
	Anthony R. Doyle	August 8, 1895	
	Charles D. Driscoll	June 18, 1888	
	Henry M. Duggan	October 5, 1896	
	Edwin F. Eldredge		
	Charles Kingsbury Endicott	October 4, 1892	
	Sven August Erickson	December 9, 1875	
	Catherine Falvey	November 6, 1910	
	John J. Falvey	February 22, 1904	
	John R. Fausey	March 19, 1870	
	Michael Paul Feeney	March 26, 1907	
	Charles E. Ferguson	January 30, 1894	
	Richard H. Fish		
	Peter F. Fitzgerald	February 16, 1889	
	John Edward Flaherty	December 31, 1910	
	William Daniel Fleming	April 14, 1907	
	Keith Falconer Fletcher	September 24, 1900	
	John F. Foster		
	Paul W. Foster		
	Douglass Brooks Francis		
	Stephen L. French	March 9, 1892	
	Richard I. Furbush	January 4, 1904	
	Dana Taylor Gallup	April 14, 1885	
	Allan E. Gifford		
	William R. Gilman		
	Theodore A. Glynn Jr.		
	Hollis M. Gott	May 25, 1885	
	Thomas T. Gray	July 22, 1892	
	Edward Childs Hall	May 12, 1870	
	Joseph J. Harnisch	December 28, 1883	
	Lawrence Alanson Haworth	May 23, 1871	
	Charles W. Hedges	March 27, 1901	
	Christian Herter	March 28, 1895	
	Theodore P. Hollis		
	Charles F. Holman	June 21, 1892	
	J. Philip Howard	February 16, 1907	
	Fred A. Hutchinson	April 5, 1881	
	William McEwen Hyde	January 27, 1910	
	Charles John Innes	June 1, 1901	
	Harvey Iris		
	Adolph Johnson	July 20, 1885	
	Ernest A. Johnson	March 13, 1897	
	William A. Jones	March 27, 1885	
	Peter John Jordan	July 23, 1910	
	Harry Kalus		
	Charles Kaplan	September 26, 1895	
	Charles A. Kelley	March 24, 1862	
	Francis Joseph Kelley	March 21, 1890	
	Richard A. Kelly	August 7, 1905	
	John V. Kimball	July 17, 1875	
	Rudolph King	November 2, 1887	
	Michael Leo Kinsella		
	John Quincy Knowles	May 21, 1895	
	Myron N. Lane		
	George Thomas Lanigan	January 4, 1909	
	Laurence W. Law		
	Walter E. Lawrence	December 8, 1905	
	Ralph Lerche	August 19, 1899	
	Louis Lobel	August 10, 1911	
	Terrance Joseph Lomax Jr.	August 29, 1907	
	William Christopher Lunney	December 24, 1910	
	Joseph Francis Luz		
	Arthur Ulton Mahan	June 18, 1900	
	Ralph Collins Mahar	January 4, 1912	
	Vincent Ambrose Mannering	July 11, 1912	
	John Francis Manning	January 4, 1906	
	Joseph Margolis	September 28, 1908	
	Philip M. Markley	March 28, 1897	
	James P. McAndrews		
	Charles Joseph McCaffrey	January 16, 1898	
	Edward A. McCarthy		
	Paul Andrew McCarthy	December 23, 1902	
	Paul J. McCarty	July 22, 1906	
	Thomas Francis McCready		
	James Patrick McDevitt		
	Patrick J. McDonough	April 29, 1911	
	Lawrence P. McHugh		
	Harold B. L. McIntosh	November 19, 1907	
	Philip McMorrow		
	Joseph A. Milano	April 8, 1883	
	Charles Miller	January 12, 1908	
	Arthur William Milne	March 28, 1908	
	George H. Mitchell Jr.		
	Walter James Moran	December 22, 1903	
	Lester Bertram Morley	April 19, 1903	
	Newell Howes Morton		
	Eric A. Nelson	July 6, 1899	
	Michael J. Neville	October 19, 1899	
	Vernon C. Newman		
	Edwin Harvey Nichols		
	Leo F. Nourse		
	Francis William Nyhan		
	Daniel L. O'Donnell		
	Tip O'Neill	December 9, 1912	
	George Joseph O'Shea	November 16, 1899	
	John Thomas Padden	May 6, 1903	
	Raymond P. Palmer	December 27, 1895	
	George Alanson Parker		
	Haven Parker		
	Clark Brownson Partridge	August 26, 1878	
	Loomis Patrick	May 4, 1907	
	Royal Bartlett Patriquin	January 7, 1895	
	James Austin Peckham		
	Harold Squire Pedler		
	Oscar Houston Perkins	January 3, 1879	
	Herman Peter Peterson	November 21, 1890	
	Frederick Everett Pierce	May 5, 1862	
	Sam G. Pillsbury	March 7, 1873	
	George William Porter	November 6, 1885	
	Harvey Armand Pothier	September 6, 1901	
	John E. Powers	November 10, 1910	
	John D. Pratt		
	Benjamin B. Priest		
	William Eben Ramsdell	May 4, 1895	
	Cornelius Edward Reddy	May 27, 1910	
	William G. Reed		
	James Robbins Reynolds		
	Hibbard Richter	April 12, 1899	
	Joseph N. Roach	March 22, 1883	
	Charles Holmes Roberts Jr.		
	William H. J. Rowan	June 21, 1879	
	Albert Rubin	January 15, 1872	
	Gerald F. Scally	July 17, 1905	
	Raymond William Schlapp		
	William J. Sessions	December 18, 1859	
	Charles E. Shepard	September 21, 1901	
	Carl A. Sheridan	March 24, 1908	
	Robert T. Sisson	February 21, 1881	
	Michael F. Skerry	January 3, 1909	
	Charles J. Skladzien		
	H. Edward Snow	April 25, 1914	
	J. Francis Southgate	May 4, 1883	
	Margaret Spear	August 10, 1882	
	Edward William Staves	May 9, 1887	
	Avery W. Steele	August 1, 1907	
	George Ward Stetson	May 31, 1902	
	Everett W. Stone		
	Daniel Francis Sullivan	February 15, 1904	
	Jeremiah Joseph Sullivan	March 9, 1905	
	John Anthony Sullivan	February 13, 1906	
	John Timothy Sullivan	March 27, 1906	
	Patrick Gilbert Sullivan	November 18, 1904	
	Eugene Joseph Sweeney	May 11, 1886	
	Joseph James Sweeney	January 5, 1893	
	Joseph A. Sylvia Jr.	September 16, 1903	
	William Otis Taft		
	Edmond Talbot Jr.	June 1, 1898	
	Robert Leroy Taylor	November 22, 1907	
	Clarence F. Telford		
	Nathaniel Tilden	November 3, 1903	
	James Francis Tobin	May 8, 1903	
	Robert Stephen Tobin		
	John E. Troy Jr.		
	Howard H. True		
	Cornelius Joseph Twomey		
	John H. Valentine	July 21, 1896	
	James L. Vallely		
	John W. Vaughan	March 20, 1878	
	James T. Violette		
	George Thomas Walsh	February 20, 1904	
	Ira C. Ward	March 7, 1862	
	Richard James White Jr.	April 14, 1890	
	William Emmet White	June 1, 1900	
	Otis M. Whitney	March 25, 1909	
	Joseph L. Whiton		
	Sumner G. Whittier	July 4, 1911	
	Frederick Willis (American politician)	May 18, 1904	
	Henry D. Winslow	September 24, 1910	
	Stanislaus George Wondolowski	August 20, 1909	
	Arthur Eaton Young		
	Arthur Lincoln Youngman		

== See also ==
- 1942 Massachusetts gubernatorial election
- 77th United States Congress
- List of Massachusetts General Courts
