= Edward C. Carroll =

American politician

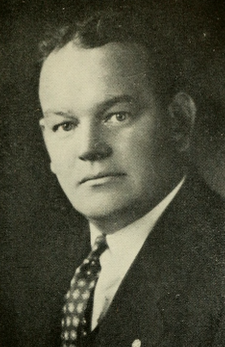

Member of the Massachusetts Senate from the 4th Suffolk District
- In office 1933–1938
- Preceded by: James J. Twohig
- Succeeded by: John E. Kerrigan

Personal details
- Born: December 15, 1893 South Boston
- Died: February 18, 1969 (aged 75) Milton, Massachusetts
- Party: Democratic
- Education: Suffolk Law School; Staley College

Edward Christopher Carroll (1893–1969) was an American politician who served in the Massachusetts Senate from 1933 to 1938.

== Early life ==
Carroll was born on December 15, 1893, in South Boston. He graduated from South Boston High School and worked as an office boy in the law office of Joseph P. Walsh. During World War I, Carroll served in the United States Navy. After the war, he joined the Veteran Boxers Association and won the organization's national light heavyweight championship in 1919. Carroll was member of the Boston Police Department until the 1919 Boston Police Strike. In 1920 he was arrested for stealing liquors and violating the Volstead Act.

== Political career ==
Carroll was elected to the Massachusetts Senate in 1932. During his tenure in the Senate, Carroll fought to have police strikers reinstated and March 17 made a holiday in Suffolk County, Massachusetts. From 1935 to 1936 he was the Democratic floor leader in the Senate. In 1935 he was indicted on charges on forging and passing out Civil Works Administration work cards.

In 1938, Carroll was appointed superintendent of buildings at the Quabbin Reservoir. In 1940, he was an unsuccessful candidate for Suffolk County Sheriff. In 1942 he attempted to reclaim his old Senate seat, but lost to Leo J. Sullivan. During the 1945 Boston mayoral election, Carroll served as a radio spokesman for John E. Kerrigan. From 1948 to 1950 he was the city assessor of Boston. In 1950 he ran in the special election for the Ward 7 seat on the Boston City Council. Carroll was a candidate for Lieutenant Governor of Massachusetts in 1952. He finished fourth in the five-candidate Democratic primary with 10% of the vote. His final position in government was with the Massachusetts Division of Motor Boats.

== Personal life ==
Outside of politics, Carroll had a real estate and insurance office in South Boston. In 1937, he graduated from Suffolk Law School. He later earned an oratory degree from the Staley School of the Spoken Word. For four decades he was a summer resident of Pembroke, Massachusetts. Carroll died on February 18, 1969, in Milton, Massachusetts of an apparent heart attack.

== See also ==
- Massachusetts legislature: 1933–1934, 1935–1936, 1937–1938
