= 1937–1938 Massachusetts legislature =

150th Massachusetts General Court
←	149th	151st	→

Overview
- Legislative body: General Court

Senate
- Members: 40

House
- Members: 240

The 150th Massachusetts General Court, consisting of the Massachusetts Senate and the Massachusetts House of Representatives, met in 1937 and 1938.

== Senators ==
Portrait	Name	Date of birth	District
	Frank David Babcock	August 16, 1877	4th Essex
	Arthur Franklin Blanchard	January 27, 1883	
	David M. Brackman	September 16, 1900	6th Suffolk
	Thomas H. Braden	September 11, 1874	
	Thomas M. Burke	May 30, 1898	
	Edward C. Carroll	December 15, 1893	
	Patrick Eugene Casey	September 24, 1886	
	Albert Cole	December 28, 1904	
	Walter L. Considine	August 7, 1900	
	Joseph R. Cotton	November 16, 1890	
	Laurence Curtis	September 3, 1893	
	Joseph P. Donahoe	September 18, 1891	
	Eugene H. Giroux	January 20, 1903	
	Angier Goodwin	January 30, 1881	
	William Patrick Grant	November 5, 1904	
	James A. Gunn	June 7, 1883	
	Cornelius F. Haley	July 15, 1875	
	James W. Hennigan Sr.	1890	
	Arthur W. Hollis	April 29, 1877	
	Newland H. Holmes	August 30, 1891	
	Sybil Holmes	June 20, 1889	
	Jarvis Hunt (politician)	March 28, 1904	
	Thomas H. Johnston	March 5, 1872	
	Joseph A. Langone Jr.	September 8, 1896	
	John D. Mackay	April 7, 1872	
	Joseph Patrick McCooey		
	William Henry McSweeney		
	James Philip Meehan	June 25, 1893	
	Charles Gardner Miles	December 2, 1879	
	George G. Moyse	December 21, 1878	
	Donald W. Nicholson	August 11, 1888	
	Edwin Lawrence Olander	October 31, 1891	
	Edmund S. Oppenheimer		
	Theodore Robinson Plunkett	May 10, 1882	
	Harris S. Richardson	January 10, 1887	
	Michael H. Selzo		
	Chester T. Skibinski		
	George W. Stanton		
	Bernard Lucian Sullivan		
	Samuel H. Wragg	June 9, 1882	

== Representatives ==
Portrait	Name	Date of birth	District
	Wilfred J. Achin	May 12, 1891	14th Middlesex
	William A. Akeroyd	October 24, 1883	
	Theodore Andrews	August 23, 1893	
	George T. Ashe	February 6, 1905	
	John Francis Aspell	July 8, 1906	
	Josiah Babcock Jr.	May 21, 1880	
	Edward P. Bacigalupo	October 19, 1897	
	William Brooks Baker	January 10, 1879	
	William A. Baldwin	January 18, 1874	
	Philip Barnet	December 2, 1892	
	Frederick M. Barnicoat		
	Mary Livermore Barrows	June 30, 1877	
	Thomas Edmund Barry	May 14, 1899	
	Walter Ray Baylies	April 28, 1902	
	Wilfred P. Bazinet		
	Fred D. Beaudoin		
	James D. Bentley	February 6, 1884	
	Albert Bergeron	June 23, 1886	
	Alfred M. Bessette	March 25, 1876	
	Rodolphe G. Bessette	September 14, 1911	
	Albert F. Bigelow	October 4, 1880	10th Norfolk
	Fred Arthur Blake	January 13, 1895	
	Edward Boland	October 1, 1911	
	Rufus Hallowell Bond	December 24, 1896	
	Albert Lionel Bourgeois	June 7, 1899	
	Philip Griggs Bowker	April 17, 1899	
	Albert Ovila Boyer	May 27, 1908	
	G. Edward Bradley	October 21, 1906	
	Edward T. Brady	October 23, 1908	
	Daniel Joseph Bresnahan	September 30, 1888	
	Warren Kingsbury Brimblecom	June 25, 1899	
	Russell P. Brown	August 24, 1891	
	William Albert Brown	February 5, 1888	
	Clarence E. Buckley		
	Arthur I. Burgess	October 13, 1894	
	James A. Burke (Massachusetts politician)	March 30, 1910	
	Harland Burke	April 22, 1888	
	Horace T. Cahill	December 12, 1894	
	Colin James Cameron	August 24, 1879	
	Robert Patterson Campbell	December 20, 1887	
	Matthew J. Capeless	June 4, 1875	
	Enrico Cappucci	1910	
	Andrew F. Carlin		
	Gustaf A. Carlson		
	Leo Edward Joseph Carney	November 16, 1899	
	Sydney G. Carpenter Jr.		
	Eddie D. Carson		
	Bernard P. Casey	July 29, 1894	
	Chester W. Chase	August 27, 1885	
	Ralph Vester Clampit	March 28, 1896	
	Frank Clarkson	June 21, 1877	
	Daniel H. Coakley Jr.	July 12, 1906	
	Andrew J. Coakley	November 6, 1906	
	John W. Coddaire Jr.		
	Edward A. Coffey	October 17, 1892	
	Samuel H. Cohen		
	John T. Comerford	June 8, 1887	
	Michael John Conway		
	Charles H. Cooke	May 13, 1878	
	Arthur W. Coolidge	October 13, 1881	
	Francis X. Coyne	March 15, 1892	
	Thomas F. Coyne		
	John Joseph Craven	August 29, 1907	
	Nelson B. Crosby	June 20, 1871	
	Lawrence Harvard Davis		
	Hiram Nichols Dearborn	December 21, 1867	
	Oscar DeRoy		
	Leo E. Diehl		
	Thomas Patrick Dillon	February 19, 1901	
	Grover N. Dodge		
	John Patrick Doherty	March 27, 1906	
	Chester A. Dolan Jr.	September 20, 1907	
	Fred Belding Dole	January 23, 1895	
	John Joseph Donahue	March 14, 1906	
	James P. Donnelly	February 26, 1890	
	Cornelius P. Donovan	March 15, 1895	
	Joseph William Dooley	October 25, 1904	
	Joseph H. Downey	December 6, 1890	
	Anthony R. Doyle	August 8, 1895	
	Joseph Edward Duffy	September 25, 1912	
	Sven August Erickson	December 9, 1875	
	Gustave William Everberg	June 24, 1890	
	Samuel Arthur Eyre		
	G. Farrington Fiske		
	Thomas A. Flaherty	December 21, 1898	
	Thomas J. Flannery	August 9, 1886	
	William Daniel Fleming	April 14, 1907	
	Keith Falconer Fletcher	September 24, 1900	
	Cleon Francis Fobes		
	John J. Foley	January 25, 1888	
	Katherine A. Foley	May 10, 1889	
	Paul W. Foster		
	Douglass Brooks Francis		
	William R. Gilman		
	John J. Gilmartin	September 25, 1892	
	Hollis M. Gott	May 25, 1885	
	John Halliwell	February 21, 1864	
	Thomas J. Hannon	December 9, 1900	
	Joseph J. Harnisch	December 28, 1883	
	William Henry Haskell		
	William Alexander Hastings	February 22, 1868	
	Lawrence Alanson Haworth	May 23, 1871	
	Jeremiah Joseph Healy	July 2, 1872	
	Charles W. Hedges	March 27, 1901	
	Christian Herter	March 28, 1895	
	William Francis Higgins	June 16, 1899	
	William D. Hillis		
	Joseph Allan Hines		
	Charles V. Hogan	April 12, 1897	
	Jackson J. Holtz		
	Daniel J. Honan	January 19, 1884	
	Frank Hathaway Horton	July 15, 1874	
	Hugh C. Hunter		
	Fred A. Hutchinson	April 5, 1881	
	Charles John Innes	June 1, 1901	
	George A. Innes		
	Francis William Irwin	November 19, 1905	
	Adolph Johnson	July 20, 1885	
	William A. Jones	March 27, 1885	
	Michael H. Jordan	February 7, 1863	
	Anthony Julian	March 25, 1902	
	Charles A. Kelley	March 24, 1862	
	Francis Joseph Kelley	March 21, 1890	
	John Joseph Kerrigan Jr.		
	John V. Kimball	July 17, 1875	
	Rudolph King	November 2, 1887	
	William E. Kirkpatrick	November 12, 1901	
	John Quincy Knowles	May 21, 1895	
	Leo P. Landry	July 10, 1897	
	Thomas J. Lane	July 6, 1898	
	Charles Clifton Langille		
	John Whitin Lasell		
	George J. Leary		
	Thomas E. Linehan		
	Terrance Joseph Lomax Jr.	August 29, 1907	
	Clarence S. Luitwieler		
	William Christopher Lunney	December 24, 1910	
	Philip J. Lynch		
	Donald Alexander MacDonald	February 21, 1893	
	Frank E. MacLean		
	Arthur Ulton Mahan	June 18, 1900	
	Ralph Collins Mahar	January 4, 1912	
	James Francis Mahoney	September 24, 1890	
	John Francis Manning	January 4, 1906	
	Philip M. Markley	March 28, 1897	
	Charles Joseph McCaffrey	January 16, 1898	
	Paul Andrew McCarthy	December 23, 1902	
	Elmer L. McCulloch		
	Daniel P. McGillicuddy		
	James J. McGrail		
	Hubert L. McLaughlin		
	George Francis McMahon		
	Roger Alton McNamara		
	Joseph A. Melley	March 1, 1902	
	Julian R. Merchant		
	Joseph A. Milano	April 8, 1883	
	Charles Miller	January 12, 1908	
	Daniel Joseph Minihan		
	John R. Mitchell		
	William E. Mooney		
	Charles H. Morrill	October 6, 1874	
	Albert Edward Morris	April 4, 1903	
	Joseph L. Murphy	January 25, 1907	
	John E. Murphy	February 13, 1900	
	John Joseph Murphy	August 28, 1892	
	Timothy Joseph Murphy	September 23, 1909	
	John M. Mutch		
	Eric A. Nelson	July 6, 1899	
	Michael J. Neville	October 19, 1899	
	Leo F. Nourse		
	Michael T. O'Brien	December 3, 1868	
	Joseph N. O'Kane	May 26, 1873	
	Tip O'Neill	December 9, 1912	
	George Joseph O'Shea	November 16, 1899	
	Otto B. Olsen		
	Charles William Olson	August 24, 1889	
	David M. Owens Jr.		
	George Alanson Parker		
	James Austin Peckham		
	Tycho Mouritz Petersen	August 29, 1892	
	Frederick Everett Pierce	May 5, 1862	
	William Eben Ramsdell	May 4, 1895	
	Frederick Henry Reinstein	April 14, 1899	
	George Edmund Rice	February 22, 1899	
	Joseph N. Roach	March 22, 1883	
	George Whiting Roberts		
	Nathan Rosenfeld	January 31, 1906	
	William H. J. Rowan	June 21, 1879	
	Albert Rubin	January 15, 1872	
	William F. Runnells	February 18, 1865	
	Philip J. Russell Jr.		
	Charles H. Savage	January 7, 1893	
	Roland D. Sawyer	January 8, 1874	
	Louis James Scanlon	March 25, 1899	
	Martin Robert Schofield	September 28, 1906	
	Mason Sears	December 29, 1899	
	William J. Sessions	December 18, 1859	
	Philip Sherman		
	Edward Sirois	December 18, 1898	
	Harry D. Sisson	January 9, 1863	
	E. Hayes Small	December 23, 1876	
	Frank William Smith	January 26, 1895	
	Roy C. Smith	January 28, 1890	
	J. Francis Southgate	May 4, 1883	
	Richard H. Stacy	August 18, 1864	
	Edward William Staves	May 9, 1887	
	George Ward Stetson	May 31, 1902	
	William Stockwell		
	Leo J. Sullivan	December 8, 1905	
	Charles F. Jeff Sullivan		
	Patrick Gilbert Sullivan	November 18, 1904	
	William T. Swain	December 2, 1878	
	Martin Swanson	July 20, 1872	
	Joseph A. Sylvia Jr.	September 16, 1903	
	Edmond Talbot Jr.	June 1, 1898	
	Frederick H. Tarr Jr.	March 25, 1903	
	Joseph E. Theberge	April 27, 1903	
	James Francis Tobin	May 8, 1903	
	John E. Troy Jr.		
	Herbert Lewis Trull		
	Christopher J. Tyrrell	June 21, 1895	
	John H. Valentine	July 21, 1896	
	John W. Vaughan	March 20, 1878	
	Ira C. Ward	March 7, 1862	
	Patrick J. Welsh	October 8, 1893	
	John B. Wenzler	June 11, 1881	
	John J. Whalen	June 5, 1876	
	John Philip White		
	William Emmet White	June 1, 1900	
	Otis M. Whitney	March 25, 1909	
	Joseph L. Whiton		
	Raymond T. Wilde		
	Ralph E. Williams		
	Frederick Willis	May 18, 1904	
	John Chester Wilson	August 14, 1889	
	Carl A. Woekel		
	Henry Eden Wright		
	Morton E. York		
	Arthur Lincoln Youngman		
	Abraham I. Zimon		

== See also ==
- 1938 Massachusetts gubernatorial election
- 75th United States Congress
- List of Massachusetts General Courts
