= Michael Paul Feeney =

American politician

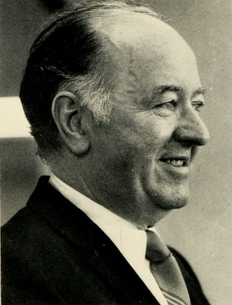
- Feeney, circa 1979

Member of the Massachusetts House of Representatives
- In office 1939–1981
- Preceded by: ^{1}
- Succeeded by: Angelo Scaccia

Member of the Boston City Council
- In office 1944–1945

Personal details
- Born: March 26, 1907 Hyde Park, Massachusetts
- Died: August 4, 1991 (aged 84) Milton, Massachusetts
- Party: Democratic

Michael Paul Feeney (March 26, 1907 – August 13, 1991) was an American politician who served in the Massachusetts House of Representatives from 1939 to 1981.

Feeney began his political career in 1938. He was elected to Massachusetts House of Representatives from a field of 38 candidates. From 1944 to 1945 he also served on the Boston City Council. In 1945 he was a candidate for Mayor of Boston. He finished in last place with 1% of the vote behind James Michael Curley, John E. Kerrigan, William Arthur Reilly, John J. Sawtelle, and Joseph Lee.

In 1952, Feeney became a member of the House Ways and Means Committee. He served as its chairman from 1959 to 1962, when he was removed by speaker John F. Thompson following a dispute between the two over a railroad tax subsidy. Feeney challenged Thompson for speaker in 1963. Governor-elect Endicott Peabody took the unprecedented step of endorsing Feeney over Thompson. After Feeney failed to defeat Thompson on the first ballot, most of his supporters backed Cornelius F. Kiernan as a compromise candidate. Thompson won on the sixth ballot.

In 1965, Feeney was a candidate in the special election to succeed the deceased Julius Ansel in the Sixth Suffolk District. He lost the Democratic primary to Samuel Harmon.

In 1973, Feeney became "Dean of the House". His tenure in the House came to an end after his defeat to Angelo Scaccia in the 1980 Democratic primary.

Feeney died on August 13, 1991, in Milton Hospital.

== See also ==
- Massachusetts legislature: 1939, 1941–1942, 1943–1944, 1945–1946, 1947–1948, 1949–1950, 1951–1952, 1953–1954, 1955–1956

== Note ==
1. The 18th Suffolk District sent two representatives to the Massachusetts House of Representatives in 1939. Feeney and Frank J. Morrison succeeded James A. Burke and Patrick J. Welsh.
