= Catherine E. Falvey =

American politician

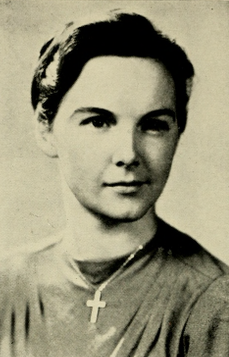

Member of the Massachusetts House of Representatives from the 24th Middlesex district
- In office 1941–1944

Personal details
- Born: Catherine Elizabeth Falvey; November 6, 1910 Somerville, Massachusetts
- Died: February 6, 1965 (aged 54) Boston, Massachusetts

Catherine Elizabeth Falvey (November 6, 1910 – February 6, 1965) was an American attorney and Democratic politician from Somerville, Massachusetts. She was the first woman veteran of World War II to run for Congress, when she was defeated by fellow veteran John F. Kennedy in 1946.

== Early life and education ==
Falvey was born in Somerville, Massachusetts, the daughter of John Joseph Falvey and Elizabeth Lillian Deacon Falvey. Her father was a civil engineer and surveyor. She graduated from Portia Law School in Boston in 1932, and was admitted to the Massachusetts bar in 1934.

== Career ==
Falvey was the youngest woman elected to the Massachusetts House of Representatives, when she represented the 24th Middlesex district from 1941 to 1944. From 1942 to 1946, she served in the Women's Army Corps (WAACs), and retired as a major. She was assigned to posts in London, Washington, D.C., and Fort Oglethorpe before she served as a prosecuting attorney and chief of the interrogation analysis division at the Nuremberg war crimes trials.

In 1946, she unsuccessfully ran for Congress in the Democratic primary for Massachusetts's 11th congressional district; she finished fifth in the race, and lost the nomination to future president John F. Kennedy. She was the first woman veteran from World War II to run for Congress. In 1948 she was a delegate to the Democratic National Convention.

In the late 1940s, Falvey toured in the United States, giving speeches to women's groups in favor of Democratic candidates, the Marshall Plan and the United Nations, and warning that political apathy could lead to fascism. "In the most critical year of our history, the year when experience was most needed in government, inexperienced men were sent to Washington," she told a North Carolina audience in 1947.

Falvey died in 1965, at the age of 54, in Boston.

== See also ==
- 1941–1942 Massachusetts legislature
- 1943–1944 Massachusetts legislature
