= Edward Rowe =

Edward Rowe may refer to:

- Edward Rowe Mores (1731–1778), English antiquarian and scholar
- Edward Rowe (politician) (1902–1971), American senator
- Edward Rowe Snow (1902–1982), American author and historian
- Edward Rowe (actor) (born 1979), Cornish actor
- Edward Rowe (footballer) (born 2003), English footballer
