= 1945 Boston mayoral election =

Election in Massachusetts, United States

- November 6, 1945

Candidate	James Michael Curley	John E. Kerrigan
Party	Nonpartisan	Nonpartisan
Popular vote	111,824	60,413
Percentage	45.74%	24.71%
Candidate	William Arthur Reilly	John J. Sawtelle
Party	Nonpartisan	Nonpartisan
Popular vote	46,135	12,743
Percentage	18.87%	5.21%
Mayor before election
John E. Kerrigan
Elected mayor
James Michael Curley

The Boston mayoral election of 1945 occurred on Tuesday, November 6, 1945. Former Mayor of Boston James Michael Curley defeated acting mayor John E. Kerrigan and four other candidates.

Curley was inaugurated on Monday, January 7, 1946.

== Candidates ==
- James Michael Curley, Member of the United States House of Representatives since 1943 and from 1913 to 1914. Mayor of Boston from 1914 to 1918, 1922 to 1926, 1930 to 1934. Governor of Massachusetts from 1935 to 1937. Member of the Massachusetts House of Representatives from 1902 to 1903.
- Michael Paul Feeney, member of the Massachusetts House of Representatives since 1939 and the Boston City Council since 1944.
- John E. Kerrigan, acting Mayor of Boston since Maurice J. Tobin's resignation in January 1945. Member of the Boston City Council since 1933.
- Joseph Lee, member of the Boston School Committee from 1937 to 1941.
- William Arthur Reilly, former Boston Fire Commissioner and a former member of the Boston Finance Commission and Boston School Committee.
- John J. Sawtelle, Member of the Massachusetts Governor's Council since 1943.

== Results ==
Candidates	General Election	
Candidates	Votes	%
James Michael Curley	111,824	45.74
John E. Kerrigan (incumbent)	60,413	24.71
William Arthur Reilly	46,135	18.87
John J. Sawtelle	12,743	5.21
Joseph Lee	10,042	4.11
Michael Paul Feeney	3,298	1.35

== See also ==
- List of mayors of Boston, Massachusetts
