= John I. Fitzgerald =

American politician

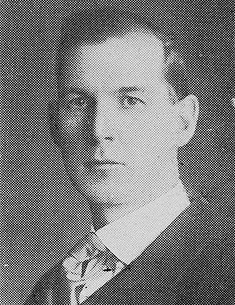
- John I Fitzgerald, circa 1918

Boston Fire Commissioner
- In office 1945–1946
- Preceded by: William Arthur Reilly
- Succeeded by: Russell S. Codman Jr.

President of the Boston City Council
- In office 1935–1937
- Preceded by: John F. Dowd
- Succeeded by: John E. Kerrigan

Member of the Boston City Council for Ward 3
- In office 1926–1939
- Preceded by: District created
- Succeeded by: Joseph Russo

Personal details
- Born: July 18, 1882 West End, Boston
- Died: December 16, 1966 (aged 84) West End, Boston
- Party: Democratic

John Ignatius Fitzgerald (July 18, 1882 – December 16, 1966) was an American attorney who served in the Massachusetts General Court and on the Boston City Council. He was the Democratic nominee for the United States Senate in 1948.

== Early life ==
Fitzgerald was born on July 18, 1882, in Boston. While in grammar school, his father died and Fitzgerald went to work as a newspaper boy. While still in his teens, Fitzgerald ran a cigar and newspaper store. In 1910 he began working as a contractor. He performed a significant amount of street work in the West End. Once he entered politics, Fitzgerald shifted from contracting to real estate. He also operated two of the city's busiest parking lots, located the near the Boston Garden/North Station.

== Political career ==
At the age of 18, Fitzgerald was chosen by Martin Lomasney to serve as a precinct captain. In 1916, Fitzgerald represented the West End in the Massachusetts House of Representatives. He served in the Massachusetts Senate from 1917 to 1918. He returned to the House in 1919 and 1920 and again from 1923 to 1927.

From 1926 to 1939, Fitzgerald represented Ward 3 on the Boston City Council. He served as the council president from 1935 to 1937. He was defeated for reelection to the council by Joseph Russo. In 1941 he finished 5th in a Boston School Committee race where the top two candidates were elected. He ran for his old council seat in 1943, but lost to Russo 47% to 26%. In 1945, Fitzgerald was appointed Boston Fire Commissioner by acting mayor John E. Kerrigan.

In 1948, Fitzgerald ran for the United States Senate seat held by Leverett Saltonstall. He won the Democratic primary over four other candidates with 30% of the vote. Fitzgerald nearly pulled off an upset, but lost the general election to Saltonstall 53% to 46%. Fitzgerald ran again in 1954, but finished third in the primary behind Foster Furcolo and Joseph L. Murphy.

== Later life and death ==
In November 1966, Fitzgerald gave up operating his parking lot near North Station. He was later confined to his home after he fell and broke his arm. At midnight on December 16, 1966, Fitzgerald died of a heart attack at his home in the West End.

== See also ==
- Massachusetts Senate's 2nd Suffolk district
- 1916 Massachusetts legislature
- 1917 Massachusetts legislature
- 1918 Massachusetts legislature
- 1919 Massachusetts legislature
- 1920 Massachusetts legislature
- 1923–1924 Massachusetts legislature
- 1925–1926 Massachusetts legislature

Party political offices
Preceded by John H. Corcoran	Democratic Party nominee for United States Senator from Massachusetts (Class II); 1948	Succeeded by Foster Furcolo
