= John J. Sawtelle =

American politician

- official portrait, 1943

Member of the Massachusetts Governor's Council for the Fourth District
- In office 1943–1947
- Preceded by: John M. Cunningham
- Succeeded by: Patrick J. McDonough

Personal details
- Born: June 18, 1894 South End
- Died: September 29, 1985 (aged 91) Dorchester
- Party: Democratic

official portrait, 1945

John J. Sawtelle (June 18, 1894 – September 29, 1985) was an American political figure from Boston who served as a member of the Massachusetts Governor's Council.

== Early life ==
Sawtelle was born on June 18, 1894, in Boston's South End. He attended Boston Public Schools and Dorchester High School. He began working at the age of 15 following the death of his father. He sold newspapers, clerked at a grocery store, and ushered at Symphony Hall. He entered the clothing business as a store clerk and worked his way up to the position of vice president and sales manager for Chauncy Clothing, one of the largest clerical clothing supply houses in the northeast United States.

== Political career ==
Sawtelle was a member of the Massachusetts Governor's Council from 1943 to 1947. In 1945, Sawtelle gained attention for voting against the confirmation of fellow Democrat William Arthur Reilly as Chairman of the Metropolitan District Commission. That same year, Sawtelle was a candidate for Mayor of Boston. He finished fourth behind James Michael Curley, John E. Kerrigan, and Reilly with 5% of the vote.

Sawtelle died on September 29, 1985.
