= Patrick McDonough =

Patrick McDonough may refer to:

- Pat McDonough (born 1943), Republican member of the Maryland House of Delegates
- Patrick McDonough (cyclist) (born 1961), retired track cyclist from the United States
- Patrick F. McDonough (died 2001), American police officer, attorney, and member of the Boston City Council
- Patrick J. McDonough (1911–1980), American politician in Massachusetts
