= William J. Casey (Massachusetts politician) =

American politician (1905–1992)

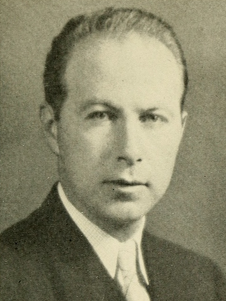
- Casey in 1945

Essex County Sheriff
- In office 1964–1964
- Preceded by: Roger E. Wells (acting)
- Succeeded by: Roger E. Wells

Member of the Massachusetts House of Representatives
- In office 1939–1941
- In office 1943–1949
- In office 1957–1964
- Preceded by: Joseph T. Conley
- Succeeded by: Michael J. Harrington

Lawrence, Massachusetts Commissioner of Public Safety
- In office 1950–1954
- Preceded by: Louis J. Scanlon
- Succeeded by: Louis J. Scanlon

Personal details
- Born: June 27, 1905 Lawrence, Massachusetts
- Died: October 15, 1992 (aged 87)
- Party: Democratic
- Occupation: Industrial foreman Politician; Sheriff

William Joseph Casey (1905–1992) was an American politician who was a member of the Massachusetts House of Representatives and Sheriff of Essex County, Massachusetts.

== Early life ==
Casey was born on June 27, 1905, in Lawrence, Massachusetts. He attended public and parochial schools in Lawrence. Outside politics Casey worked as an industrial foreman.

== Political career ==
=== Massachusetts House of Representatives ===
Casey served in the Massachusetts House of Representatives from 1939 to 1941 and again 1943 to 1949.

=== Lawrence Alderman/Commissioner of Public Safety ===
In 1949 Casey was elected Alderman and Commissioner of Public Safety over incumbent Louis J. Scanlon 19,677 votes to 19,551. In 1951 he defeated Scanlon for reelection 19,554 to 17,443.

=== Massachusetts House of Representatives ===
Casey returned to the Massachusetts House of Representatives in 1957. While in the House, Casey supported legislation to give the Mayor of Boston more control over the Boston Police Department (including control over the department's budget and the power to appoint the Police Commissioner) and to construction roads that would provide Lawrence with access to I-93 and I-495.

=== Essex County Sheriff ===
In 1964, Casey was appointed Sheriff of Essex County by Governor Endicott Peabody to fill the vacancy caused by the death of Earl Wells. On June 4, 1964, the Massachusetts Governor's Council confirmed his appointed 7 to 0 and he was sworn in by Peabody that same day. After taking office, nineteen of the department's deputies and court officers walked-out in support of Special Sheriff (and the son of Earl Wells) Roger E. Wells, who had been passed over in favor of Casey. Casey was able to keep the county's courts running by temporarily replacing the resigning deputies with deputies sent over from Middlesex County.

Wells defeated Casey in the special election to fill his father's unexpired term, 136,860 votes to 135,185. Casey challenged Wells in 1968, but lost 159,438 votes to 108,323.

== Death ==
Casey died on October 15, 1992.

== See also ==
- Massachusetts legislature: 1939, 1941–1942, 1943–1944, 1945–1946, 1947–1948
