= Charles F. Sullivan =

American politician (1904-1962)

Charles F. Jeff Sullivan
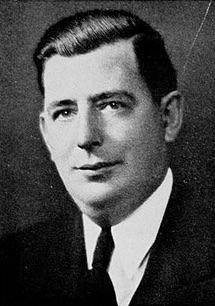
- Sullivan in 1945

57th Lieutenant Governor of Massachusetts
- In office January 6, 1949 – January 8, 1953
- Governor: Paul A. Dever
- Preceded by: Arthur W. Coolidge
- Succeeded by: Sumner G. Whittier

Mayor of Worcester, Massachusetts
- In office 1946–1949
- Preceded by: William A. Bennett
- Succeeded by: Andrew B. Holstrom

Massachusetts Senate First Worcester District
- In office 1941–1946
- Preceded by: Joseph Patrick McCooey
- Succeeded by: William Daniel Fleming

Massachusetts House of Representatives
- In office 1937–1940

City of Worcester, Massachusetts Common Council
- In office 1936–1937

Personal details
- Born: Charles F. Sullivan; October 10, 1904 Worcester, Massachusetts, U.S.
- Died: August 24, 1962 (aged 57) Worcester, Massachusetts, U.S.
- Party: Democratic
- Spouse: Helen
- Profession: Restaurateur, Liquor store owner

Charles F. Jeff Sullivan (October 10, 1904 – August 24, 1962) was an American politician who served as the 57th lieutenant governor of Massachusetts from 1949 to 1953. Sullivan was also a member of the Worcester, Massachusetts Common Council, a member of the Massachusetts House of Representatives, a Massachusetts State Senator and the Mayor of Worcester, Massachusetts from 1946 to 1949.

== Early life ==
Sullivan was the ninth of fifteen children born to Timothy and Mary Sullivan. When he was seven years old, Sullivan was nicknamed Jeff by a childhood friend who did not like the names Charles or Charlie. He eventually legally changed his name to Charles F. Jeff Sullivan. He dropped out of high school to work as an errand boy for the Reed and Prince Manufacturing Company. He earned extra money by selling lunches to his co-workers, which led to him opening a lunch cart.

On September 3, 1928 he married Helen Norma McMahon. They had three daughters.

== Entry into politics ==
At the age of thirty, Sullivan went into politics, he was first elected to the Worcester, Massachusetts Common Council in 1935, this was followed by election to the Massachusetts House of Representatives in 1937 and to the Massachusetts Senate in 1940.

== Mayor of Worcester ==
Sullivan first ran for Mayor in 1943, however he lost that election to the Republican candidate William Bennett. Sullivan ran again for the Mayoralty in 1945, this time he was elected. During his term as mayor Sullivan worked to develop the new Worcester Airport, blacktop the city's streets, covering up the old streetcar tracks that were no longer in use and to clean up the city's pension system. Sullivan was reelected mayor in 1948 and he served until 1949 when Worcester changed its city government to a Plan E format, under which the mayor is no longer popularly elected but is instead selected by votes of the City Council.

== Lieutenant Governor of Massachusetts ==
On November 3, 1948, Sullivan was elected as Lieutenant Governor of Massachusetts, he was also reelected as mayor of Worcester and until 1949 he served in both capacities. Sullivan was reelected a lieutenant governor in 1950 of Massachusetts, he ran for reelection in 1952, however he lost in the Republican landslide of that year.

== Post political career ==
Following his defeat, Sullivan retired from politics and opened up a liquor store. He died on August 24, 1962 at Saint Vincent Hospital.

== See also ==
- Massachusetts legislature: 1941–1942, 1943–1944, 1945–1946

Party political offices
Preceded by Paul A. Dever	Democratic nominee for Lieutenant Governor of Massachusetts; 1948, 1950, 1952	Succeeded by James A. Burke
Political offices
Preceded by Arthur W. Coolidge	Lieutenant Governor of Massachusetts; 1949 – 1953	Succeeded by Sumner G. Whittier
Preceded by William A. Bennett	Mayor of Worcester, Massachusetts; 1946 – 1949	Succeeded by Andrew B. Holstrom
