= Rudolph King =

American politician (1887-1961)

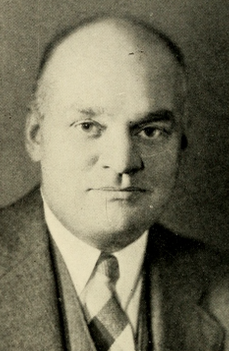

Speaker of the Massachusetts House of Representatives
- In office 1943 – August 16, 1944
- Preceded by: Christian Herter
- Succeeded by: Frederick Willis

Massachusetts Registrar of Motor Vehicles
- In office August 16, 1944 – November 30, 1957
- Preceded by: Frank A. Goodwin
- Succeeded by: Clement A. Riley

Personal details
- Born: November 2, 1887 Horton Bluff, Nova Scotia
- Died: September 10, 1961 (aged 73) Millis, Massachusetts
- Party: Republican
- Profession: Sales Manager and General Manager of Medway Shoes Manufacturing Corp.

Rudolph Francis King (November 2, 1887 – September 10, 1961) was an American politician who served as a member of the Massachusetts House of Representatives from 1937 to 1944 and was House Speaker from 1943 to 1944. Born in Horton Bluff, Nova Scotia, he had previously served as a member of the School Committee, Board of Assessors, and the Board of Health and Cemeteries and was the town moderator and chairman of the board of selectmen in Millis, Massachusetts.

King resigned from the House on August 16, 1944, to become registrar of motor vehicles. In 1946 he was nominated by Governor Maurice J. Tobin to serve as State Commissioner of Public Works, but refused the offer. In 1957, King was forced to retire following a vote by the Massachusetts Governor's Council to remove King from office after he reached the state's mandatory retirement age of 70.

King was an unsuccessful candidate for a seat on the Governor's Council during the 1958 election.

King died on September 10, 1961, in Millis, Massachusetts.

== See also ==
- Massachusetts legislature: 1937–1938, 1939, 1941–1942, 1943–1944

Massachusetts House of Representatives
Preceded by Christian Herter	Speaker of the Massachusetts House of Representatives; 1943 — 1944	Succeeded by Frederick Willis
