= Jarvis Hunt (politician) =

American politician (1904-1994)

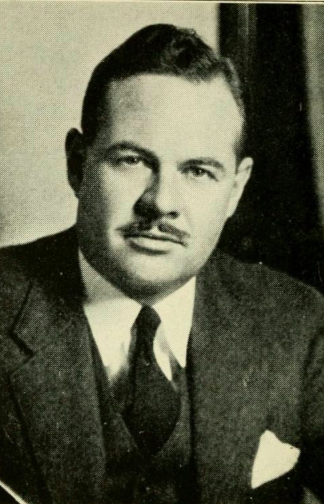
- Hunt c. 1943

President of the Massachusetts Senate
- In office 1942–1944
- Preceded by: Angier L. Goodwin
- Succeeded by: Arthur W. Coolidge

Member of the Massachusetts Senate from the 1st Bristol District
- In office 1937–1945
- Preceded by: James G. Moran
- Succeeded by: Willard A. Ormsbee

Personal details
- Born: March 28, 1904 North Attleborough, Massachusetts
- Died: October 11, 1994 (aged 90) Attleboro, Massachusetts
- Party: Republican
- Education: Harvard College; Harvard Law School
- Occupation: Attorney

Jarvis Hunt (March 28, 1904 – October 11, 1994) was an American politician who served as President of the Massachusetts Senate from 1942 to 1944.

== Early life ==
Hunt was born on March 28, 1904, in North Attleborough, Massachusetts. He attended North Attleborough public schools and Phillips Exeter Academy. He graduated from Harvard College in 1927 and Harvard Law School in 1930. After law school he did not receive an offer to join a firm, so he started his own practice in North Attleborough. According to Hunt "the rush of clients to my door was so moderate that I had plenty of time to get into local politics."

== Political career ==
Hunt served as president of the North Attleborough Republican Town Committee and was later elected to the town's Board of Selectmen. In 1936 he was elected to the Massachusetts Senate, representing the 1st Bristol District. In 1938 he served as chairman of a special commission that studied the conditions surrounding the practice of osteopathy. The following year he was appointed chair of a special commission that investigated the granting of pardons during the administrations of former Governors James Michael Curley, Charles F. Hurley, and Joseph B. Ely. The commission uncovered evidence that led to the impeachment of Massachusetts Governor's Councilor Daniel H. Coakley and the retirement of two members of the state parole board. He also served emergency transportation committee, which was responsible for keeping service on the Old Colony Railroad alive, and the Congressional redistricting committee. In 1940, Hunt managed Henry Parkman Jr.'s campaign for the United States Senate.

In 1941, Hunt was elected majority floor leader. In 1942, Senate President Angier Goodwin resigned to become chairman of the state commission of administration of finance and Hunt was elected to succeed him. In 1944, Hunt decided that due to his growing family, he would have to "advance politically or retire gracefully" in order to find a position with a higher salary. He sought the Republican nomination for Lieutenant Governor, but lost to Middlesex County District Attorney Robert F. Bradford.

== Later life ==
After leaving the Senate, Hunt maintained as private law practice, served as town counsel of North Attleborough, general counsel of the Associated Industries of Massachusetts trade group, and was the legal assistant to the general manager of the Raynham Park greyhound track. From 1963 until his death on October 11, 1994, he was president of Raynham Park.

== See also ==
- Massachusetts legislature: 1937–1938, 1939, 1941–1942, 1943–1944
