= Cornelius Desmond (American politician) =

American politician

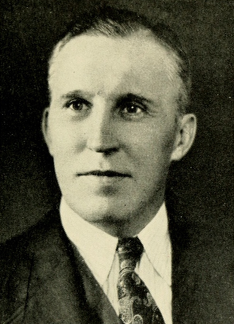

City Manager of Lowell, Massachusetts
- In office 1962–1963
- Preceded by: Frank E. Barrett
- Succeeded by: P. Harold Ready

Member of the Massachusetts House of Representatives from the 15th Middlesex District
- In office 1941–1962
- Succeeded by: John Janas

Personal details
- Born: Cornelius F. Desmond Jr. October 4, 1893 Pittsfield, Massachusetts
- Died: October 2, 1974 (aged 80) Lowell, Massachusetts
- Resting place: St. Patrick's Cemetery; Lowell, Massachusetts
- Party: Democratic
- Spouse: Helena C. (Lepper) Desmond
- Children: One son, three daughters
- Occupation: Politician; City Manager

Cornelius F. Desmond Jr. (October 4, 1893 – October 2, 1974) was an American politician who served in the Massachusetts House of Representatives and as City Manager of Lowell, Massachusetts.

== Early life ==
Desmond was born on October 4, 1893, in Pittsfield, Massachusetts. He attended Lowell public schools and graduated from Lowell High School. A standout baseball player, Desmond went on to for a number of play semi-pro baseball teams.

During World War I, Desmond served in the United States Army. After the war, he worked in the circulation department of newspapers in Boston and New York. In the 1930s, Desmond worked as a supervisor for the Works Progress Administration.

== Political career ==
In 1940, Desmond was elected to the Massachusetts House of Representatives. He would go on to serve a total of 11 terms. He served on a number of important committees, including a stint as chairman of the House Ways and Means Committee.

In 1962, Desmond was named City Manager of Lowell and resigned from the House shortly after that. He served as city manager for 22 months before he reached the mandatory retirement age of 70 and had to leave office.

== Later life and death ==
Desmond remained in Lowell after his retirement. He died on October 2, 1974, at St. John's Hospital in Lowell.

== See also ==
- Massachusetts legislature: 1941–1942, 1943–1944, 1945–1946, 1947–1948, 1949–1950, 1951–1952, 1953–1954, 1955–1956
