= Leo Curley =

American politician (1915–1950)

Boston Traffic Commissioner
- In office 1947–1949
- Preceded by: William P. Hickey
- Succeeded by: William Arthur Reilly

Personal details
- Born: April 6, 1915 Boston, Massachusetts, USA
- Died: December 11, 1950 (aged 35) Boston, Massachusetts, US
- Party: Democratic
- Spouse: Catherine Sweeney (1940-1950; his death)
- Education: Georgetown University; Georgetown Law School
- Occupation: Lawyer

Leo Francis Curley (April 6, 1915 – December 11, 1950) was the son of American politician James Michael Curley. Seen by the elder Curley as his successor in politics, Curley served as the city's traffic commissioner during his father's final term as Mayor of Boston. Leo Curley died shortly thereafter at the age of 35.

== Early life ==
Curley was born on April 6, 1915. He was the fifth child born to the Curleys and named after Pope Leo the Great. He was baptized on April 18, 1915, at St. Patrick's Church in Roxbury by Rev. Joseph H. Gallagher, who had christened James Michael Curley 40 years earlier.

In 1930, Curley and his brothers James and Paul received an audience with Pope Pope Pius XI. The Pope blessed a number of religious articles the children brought and presented them with a medal and written blessings for their father and the city of Boston.

On December 5, 1931, Curley struck a woman with his car at the corner of Huntington Avenue and Forsyth Street. She died from her injuries five days later. On December 18, Judge Frankland W. L. Miles declined to issue warrants charging Curley with manslaughter and operating an automobile to endanger the public, ruling that due to poor visibility the accident was unavoidable. Registrar of Motor Vehicles Morgan T. Ryan disagreed with Miles and suspended Curley's license for six months, stating that "Curley should have seen [the victim] before she was struck".

== College ==
Curley attended Georgetown University, where he played right tackle for the Georgetown Hoyas football team. In 1935 he played on a Collegiate All Star team that faced a barnstorming group of former Notre Dame football players at Boston Garden. As the game was played indoors, the field was 90 yards long and 30 yards wide. Goal posts were on the goal line and the end-zones were arced. Curley was also chosen as the best speaker in Georgetown's Philodemic Society and was a member of the school's debate team. As a sophomore he won the Qucksall medal for best oral examination in Shakespeare and in 1935 he was awarded the Hamilton medal for excellence in spontaneous debating. He graduated from the University's College of Arts and Sciences in 1936 and was selected to give the senior address at commencement.

Curley went on to attend Harvard Law School, however he withdrew in May 1937 after professor Warren A. Seavey compared his father to William Hale Thompson, the corrupt former Mayor of Chicago, during a classroom discussion. Professor Seavey apologized for offending Curley and asked him to reconsider his decision to withdraw. Another professor, Edward H. Warren, had allegedly told Curley "you can't get over your congenital defects" following an unsatisfactory answer to a question, which also factored in Curley's decision to leave Harvard.

After leaving Harvard, Curley enrolled at Georgetown Law School. On April 29, 1940, he married Catherine Sweeney of New York City in Alexandria, Virginia. Curley and Sweeney had known each other since they were children and had been dating for about seven or eight years.

In May 1942, Curley entered the United States Naval Reserves. He performed blimp patrols along the coast. After the war, Curley resumed his law practice.

== Politics ==
Curley frequently made appearances on the campaign trail as a surrogate for his father. During the 1932 United States presidential election, Curley accompanied his father on a speaking tour of the western United States on behalf of Democratic nominee Franklin D. Roosevelt. The younger Curley spoke briefly at the American Federation of Labor's Labor Day exercises at Soldier Field in Chicago and at a luncheon at Warner Brothers studios broadcast over KFWB. During James Michael Curley's 1936 campaign for the United States Senate, Leo and his sister Mary filled in at campaign rallies after their father fell ill.

In 1938, Curley was elected as a delegate to the state Democratic convention. He was unanimously selected to serve as the convention secretary. He was a candidate for delegate to the 1940 Democratic National Convention, but dropped out to focus on his law school studies and to prepare for the bar exam. At the 1946 Democratic state convention, Curley served as toastmaster. He presented the entire ticket and spoke of party unity.

In 1946, Curley's father got him a job in the city's law department. The following year was appointed chairman of Boston traffic commission. The elder Curley lost the 1949 Boston mayoral election and Leo Curley was not retained by the new mayor, John Hynes. Curley returned to his private law practice.

== Death ==
On December 11, 1950, Curley's sister Mary Curley Donnelly died suddenly of a cerebral hemorrhage while talking on the phone at her apartment. Curley went to his sister's apartment later that night. He used her phone to call their youngest brother, Frater Francis Curley S. J. While on the phone, Curley collapsed and died of a cerebral hemorrhage. He was the seventh of Curley's children to die during their father's lifetime.
