= Staley School of the Spoken Word =

Coordinates: 42.334665°N 71.123070°W

Delbert Moyer Staley in 1905

The Staley School of the Spoken Word was an elocutionary school in Massachusetts from 1905 to 1957. Its founder, Dr. Delbert Moyer Staley, opened the school in 1905 as the College of the Spoken Word on Huntington Avenue in Boston. By 1920, the school had relocated to Brookline and was located at Washington Street and Cypress Street. It was also known as the "Staley School of Oratory", "Staley School", or "Staley College". It closed in 1957, and since at least 1982, their charter was held by Boston College.

Many aspiring leaders and politicians came to the school, largely to polish their presence and presentation. In 1951, twenty-one Republicans from the Massachusetts state legislature took night classes together to improve their public speaking skills after losing their majority in the House. The majority had already earned college degrees, some from institutions such as Harvard University. One famous Harvard alumnus to be graduated from Staley was future president John F. Kennedy.

== Notable alumni ==
- Edward C. Carroll, Member of the Massachusetts Senate from 1933 to 1938.
- James Michael Curley, Mayor of Boston, Governor of Massachusetts, Member of the United States House of Representatives
- George Demeter, member of the Massachusetts House of Representatives, law professor, and author of Demeter's Manual of Parliamentary Law and Procedure
- Joseph P. Kennedy Jr., United States Navy officer, older brother of John F. Kennedy, killed during World War II
- John F. Kennedy, 35th President of the United States
- Paul Pender, boxer
- David J. O'Connor, member of the Massachusetts House of Representatives from 1951 to 1970
- Dapper O'Neil, member of the Boston City Council from 1971 to 1999
- Maurice J. Tobin, Governor of Massachusetts, U.S. Secretary of Labor, Mayor of Boston
- Thomas J. Spring, Massachusetts judge
