= Keith Falconer Fletcher =

American politician

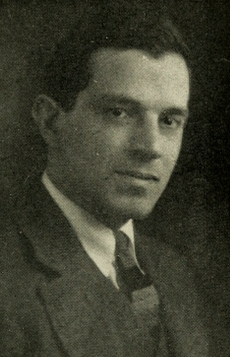
- Keith Fletcher Massachusetts member House of Representatives 1929

Member Massachusetts House of Representatives 6th Hampden District
- In office 1937–1942

Member Springfield, Massachusetts City Council
- In office 1935–1936

Personal details
- Born: September 24, 1900 Altamont, New York
- Died: 1987 Modesto, California

Keith Falconer Fletcher was born in Altamont, New York, on September 24, 1900, and died in Modesto, California, in 1987. He was a book dealer. He served in the Massachusetts House of Representatives, 6th Hampden District, from 1937 to 1942. He was educated at Sidney High School in New York, Hamilton College, and completed his graduate studies at Harvard University. He was a member of the Delta Kappa Epsilon fraternity. Prior to serving in the House of Representatives, Fletcher served on the Springfield City Council (1936).

== See also ==
- Massachusetts legislature: 1937–1938, 1939, 1941–1942

== Sources ==
- Public Officials of Massachusetts 1941-42 Howard's "Who's Who" of the Legislature
