= Arthur W. Coolidge =

American politician (1881-1952)

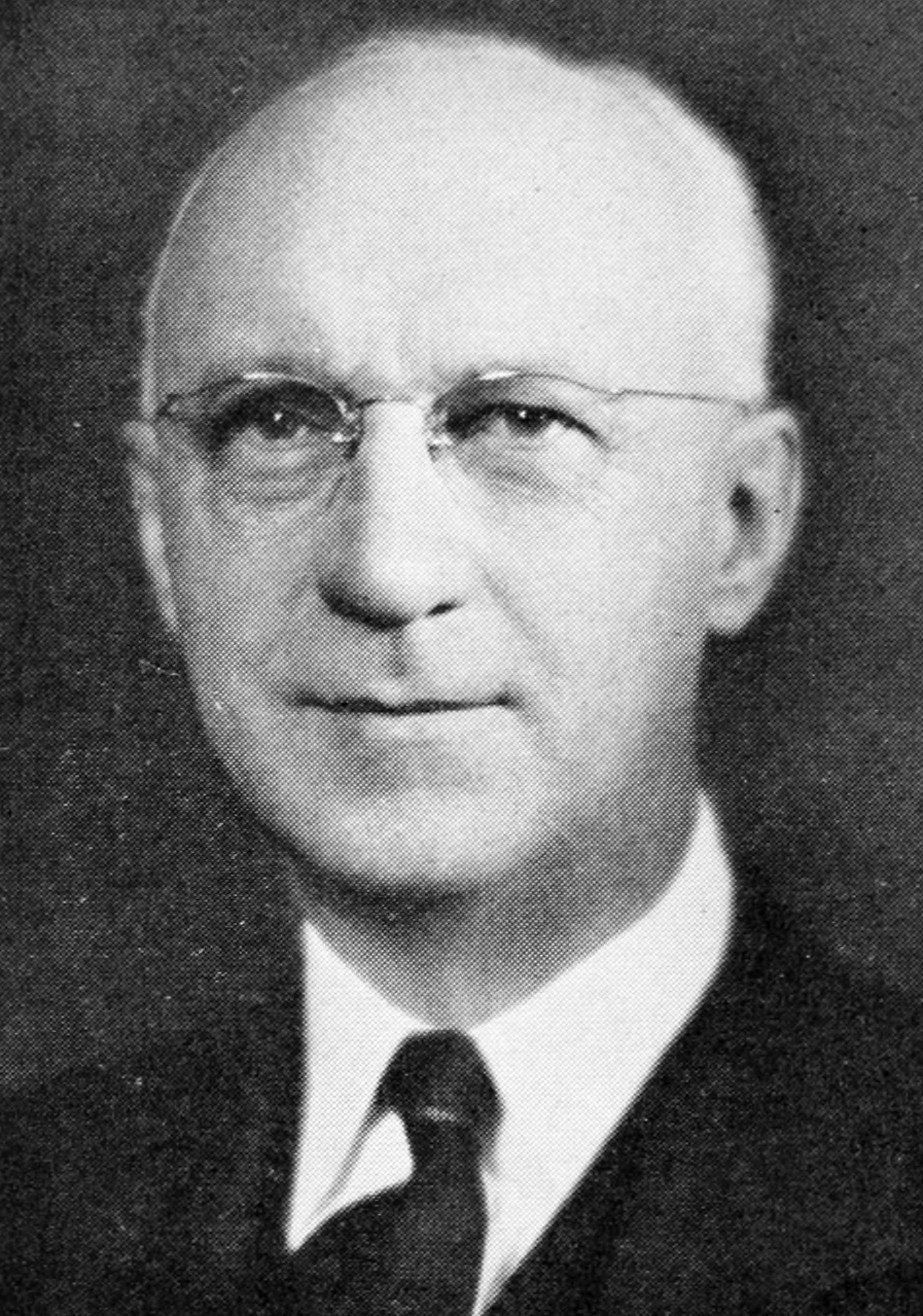

56th Lieutenant Governor of Massachusetts
- In office January 2, 1947 – January 6, 1949
- Governor: Robert F. Bradford
- Preceded by: Robert F. Bradford
- Succeeded by: Charles F. Sullivan

President of the Massachusetts Senate
- In office 1945–1946
- Preceded by: Jarvis Hunt
- Succeeded by: Donald W. Nicholson

Member of the Massachusetts Senate from the 7th Middlesex District
- In office 1941–1946
- Preceded by: Joseph R. Cotton
- Succeeded by: George Jelly Evans

Member of the Massachusetts House of Representatives
- In office 1937–1940

Personal details
- Born: Arthur William Coolidge; October 13, 1881 Cumberland County, Maine, U.S.
- Died: January 23, 1952 (aged 70) Reading, Massachusetts, U.S.
- Party: Republican
- Spouse: Mabel Tilton
- Relations: Richard B. Coolidge (brother); Calvin Coolidge (cousin); Martha Coolidge (granddaughter)
- Children: 2
- Education: Tufts University (1903); Harvard Law School (1906)
- Profession: Attorney

Arthur William Coolidge (October 13, 1881 – January 23, 1952) was a Massachusetts politician who served multiple positions within the state government.

== Early life ==
Coolidge was born in Cumberland County, Maine.

== Career ==
Coolidge worked as a lawyer before becoming a member of the Massachusetts House of Representatives (1937–1940) and of the Massachusetts State Senate (1941–1946). From 1947 to 1949 he was the 56th lieutenant governor of Massachusetts. He was the Republican nominee for governor in 1950.

From 1943 to 1947, Coolidge was head of a legislative commission (popularly known as the Coolidge Commission) to address the future of the Boston Elevated Railway (BERy). The commission proposed a number of suburban extensions – some of which were built over the following four decades – and created the plans to reform the BERy as the Metropolitan Transit Authority, the predecessor of the modern Massachusetts Bay Transportation Authority.

A Unitarian and Freemason, Coolidge served as Grand Master of Masons (1943–1944) and a member of the American Bar Association and Theta Delta Chi. In 1951, he was elected as a member of the Massachusetts Society of the Sons of the American Revolution.

== Personal life ==
A fourth cousin to President Calvin Coolidge, he had one daughter, Dorothy Coolidge Cox and two sons: Robert Tilton Coolidge (1915–1955) and Arthur William Coolidge II. One of his grandchildren is film director Martha Coolidge.

He was brother of Massachusetts politician Richard B. Coolidge.

=== Death ===
Coolidge died at his home in Boston and is buried in Forest Glen Cemetery in Reading, Massachusetts. The Arthur W. Coolidge Middle School was named in his honor.

== See also ==
- Massachusetts legislature: 1937–1938, 1939, 1941–1942, 1943–1944, 1945–1946

Party political offices
Preceded by Robert F. Bradford	Republican nominee for Lieutenant Governor of Massachusetts; 1946, 1948	Succeeded by Laurence Curtis
Preceded by Robert F. Bradford	Republican nominee for Governor of Massachusetts; 1950	Succeeded by Christian Herter
Political offices
Preceded by Robert Bradford	Lieutenant Governor of Massachusetts; 1947–1949	Succeeded by Charles F. Sullivan
