= John M. Cunningham =

American lawyer

Member of the Massachusetts Governor's Council from the 4th district
- In office 1941–1943
- Preceded by: Daniel H. Coakley
- Succeeded by: John J. Sawtelle

Personal details
- Born: May 4, 1895 Boston
- Died: February 15, 1973 (aged 77) Boston
- Party: Democratic
- Education: Georgetown University; Boston University School of Law
- Occupation: Lawyer

John Madigan Cunningham (May 4, 1895 – February 15, 1973) was an American attorney who served as legal counsel to the Roman Catholic Archdiocese of Boston.

== Early life ==
Cunningham was born in Boston to H. Vincent and Anna Smith (Madigan) Cunningham. He attended Boston Public Schools before entering Fordham Preparatory School. At Fordham, Cunningham was class president for four years. After graduating in 1914, Cunningham attended Georgetown University. From 1917 to 1919, Cunningham worked as an assistant on the legal staff at the American consulate in Paris.

== Legal career ==
In 1922, Cunningham graduated from the Boston University School of Law. He then worked for his father's firm in Boston. Cunningham served as legal counsel for the Roman Catholic Archdiocese of Boston and frequently appeared before the Massachusetts General Court on behalf of the Cardinal William Henry O'Connell. He also served on an Archdiocese committee that fought against the legalization of birth control.

Following the impeachment of Massachusetts Governor's Councilor Daniel H. Coakley, Cunningham was appointed to succeed him. His appointment was backed by Republican House Speaker Christian Herter, who argued that because the 4th Council District was overwhelmingly Democratic, a Democrat should be appointed to represent it. Although a Democrat, Cunningham supported Republican Governor Leverett Saltonstall. His nomination was approved on a mostly party-line votes with Republicans supporting the "dark horse" Cunningham and the Democrats back the more well-known John E. Powers.

Cunningham also served as a special assistant to the president of Georgetown University, was a director of the Boston Chamber of Commerce, and served as chairman of Jamaica Plain's draft board.

== Personal life ==
On October 17, 1929, Cunningham married Mildred Manning, the daughter of tobacco merchant Joseph P. Manning. The ceremony was presided over by Cardinal O'Connell.

Cunningham died on February 15, 1973, at Massachusetts General Hospital. He was survived by his wife and two daughters. He was buried at Mount Calvary Cemetery in Roslindale.
