= Russell P. Brown =

American politician

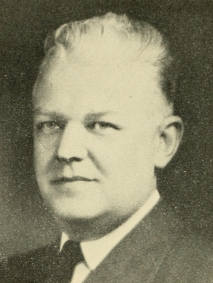
- Russell Brown in 1945

Member of the Massachusetts House of Representatives from the 15th Essex district
- In office 1937–1947
- Preceded by: Henry Cabot Lodge Jr.
- Succeeded by: Andrew E. Faulkner

Personal details
- Born: August 24, 1891 Beverly, Massachusetts
- Died: January 19, 1965 (aged 73) Beverly, Massachusetts
- Party: Republican
- Education: Worcester Academy
- Occupation: Businessman; Bank executive

Russell P. Brown was an American banker and politician who served a member of the Massachusetts House of Representatives and president of Beverly Cooperative Bank.

== Early life ==
Brown was born on August 24, 1891, in Beverly, Massachusetts. He attended Beverly public schools and Worcester Academy.

== Business career ==
From 1916 to 1942, Brown ran a mail-order greeting card business. In 1927 he was elected to the board of directors of the Beverly Cooperative Bank. In 1942 he became the bank's vice president and from 1944 until his death in 1965 he was the bank's president. During his tenure as president, the bank building at 246 Cabot Street was destroyed by a fire. A new building was completed at 254 Cabot Street a year later.

== Political career ==
In 1923, Brown was elected to the Beverly school committee. He became the committee chairman in 1940. From 1937 to 1947 he was a member of the Massachusetts House of Representatives.

== Death ==
In January 1965, Brown was admitted to Beverly Hospital for treatment for a heart ailment. He died there on January 19, 1965.

== See also ==
- Massachusetts legislature: 1937–1938, 1939, 1941–1942, 1943–1944, 1945–1946
