= Enrico Cappucci =

American politician

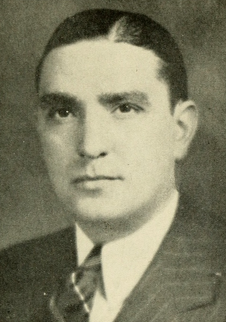
- Enrico Cappucci Portrait

Member of the Massachusetts House of Representatives
- In office 1937–1949

Personal details
- Born: December 12, 1910 East Boston
- Died: August 27, 1976 (aged 66) Winthrop, Massachusetts
- Party: Democratic
- Spouse: Virginia C. Meany (1942–1976)
- Children: 5
- Education: Suffolk Law School
- Occupation: Lawyer

Enrico Cappucci (1910–1976) was an American politician who served as a member of the Massachusetts House of Representatives.

Cappucci was born on December 12, 1910, in East Boston. He attended East Boston High School, Thayer Academy, Harvard College, and Suffolk Law School. From 1937 to 1949, Cappucci represented East Boston in the Massachusetts House of Representatives. In 1948 he was an unsuccessful candidate for Massachusetts Attorney General. Following his political career, Cappucci worked his an attorney and lobbyist. His clients included the Eastern Massachusetts Street Railway, American Mutual Alliance Insurance Co., and the Home Builders Association of Massachusetts. He later returned to government service as the clerk of the Boston Appellate Court. Cappucci died on August 27, 1976.

== See also ==
- Massachusetts legislature: 1937–1938, 1939, 1941–1942, 1943–1944, 1945–1946, 1947–1948
