= James A. Burke (Massachusetts politician) =

American politician (1910–1983)

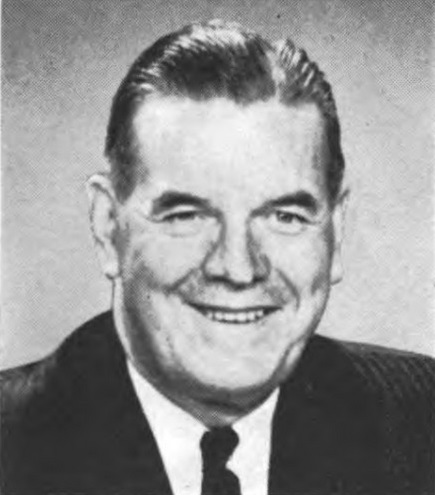

Member of the U.S. House of Representatives from Massachusetts
- In office January 3, 1959 – January 3, 1979
- Preceded by: Richard B. Wigglesworth
- Succeeded by: Brian J. Donnelly
- Constituency: 13th district (1959–63); 11th district (1963–79)

Member of the Massachusetts House of Representatives
- In office 1947–1955
- Preceded by: John T. Padden
- Succeeded by: Michael Herbert Cantwell
- In office 1937–1939
- Preceded by: Frank J. Morrison
- Succeeded by: Michael Paul Feeney and Frank J. Morrison^{1}

Personal details
- Born: March 30, 1910 Boston, Massachusetts, U.S.
- Died: October 13, 1983 (aged 73) Boston, Massachusetts, U.S.
- Party: Democratic
- Education: Suffolk University

Military service
- Allegiance: United States
- Branch/service: United States Army
- Unit: 77th Infantry Division
- Battles/wars: World War II

James Anthony Burke (March 30, 1910 – October 13, 1983) was a United States representative from Massachusetts from 1959 to 1979.

== Biography ==
He was born in Boston, Massachusetts. He was educated in the Boston public schools and Lincoln Preparatory School and attended Suffolk University.

Burke was a real estate salesman, and served in appointive positions including registrar of vital statistics for the city of Boston.

He was a Democrat, and served in the Massachusetts House of Representatives from 1937 to 1939.

During World War II Burke was a special agent in Counter-intelligence, attached to the 77th Infantry Division in the South Pacific.

After the war he was again elected to the Massachusetts House, serving four terms, 1947 to 1955, and attaining the position of assistant majority leader.

He served as vice chairman of the Massachusetts Democratic State Committee for four years. He was the unsuccessful Democratic candidate for lieutenant governor in 1954, and ran unsuccessfully for the Democratic nomination in 1956.

In 1958 Burke was elected to the Eighty-sixth Congress. He was reelected to the nine succeeding Congresses, and served from January 3, 1959, to January 3, 1979. He rose through seniority to become the second-ranking Democrat on the Ways and Means Committee, and was considered an expert on the Social Security system. Burke was not a candidate for reelection in 1978 to the Ninety-sixth Congress.

He was a resident of Milton, Massachusetts, until his death in Boston, Massachusetts, on October 13, 1983, and his interment was at Milton Cemetery in Milton, Massachusetts.

== See also ==
- Massachusetts legislature: 1937–1938, 1947–1948, 1949–1950, 1951–1952, 1953–1954

== Note ==
1. The 18th Suffolk District sent two representatives to the Massachusetts House of Representatives in 1939. Michael Paul Feeney and Frank J. Morrison succeeded Burke and Patrick J. Welsh.

Party political offices
| Preceded by Charles F. Sullivan | Democratic nominee for Lieutenant Governor of Massachusetts; 1954 | Succeeded by Robert F. Murphy |
U.S. House of Representatives
| Preceded by Richard B. Wigglesworth | Member of the U.S. House of Representatives from Massachusetts's 13th congressional district January 3, 1959 - January 3, 1963 | Succeeded by District eliminated |
| Preceded by Tip O'Neill | Member of the U.S. House of Representatives from Massachusetts's 11th congressional district January 3, 1963 - January 3, 1979 | Succeeded by Brian J. Donnelly |
