= Frederick Willis (American politician) =

American politician (1904–1971)

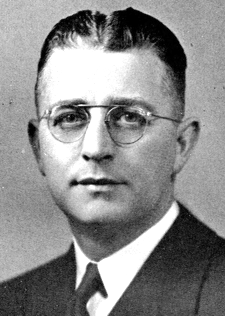

Member of the Massachusetts House of Representatives from the 10th Essex district
- In office 1937–1949
- Preceded by: William Landergan
- Succeeded by: Belden Bly

Personal details
- Born: May 18, 1904 Saugus, Massachusetts
- Died: October 2, 1971 (aged 67) Lynn, Massachusetts
- Party: Republican
- Education: Northeastern University; Boston University School of Law
- Occupation: Lawyer

Frederick Bancroft Willis (May 18, 1904 – October 2, 1971) was an American politician who served as Speaker of the Massachusetts House of Representatives from 1945 to 1948.

== Early life ==
Willis was born on May 18, 1904, in Saugus, Massachusetts. He attended Saugus High School, Northeastern University, and the Boston University School of Law.

== Political career ==
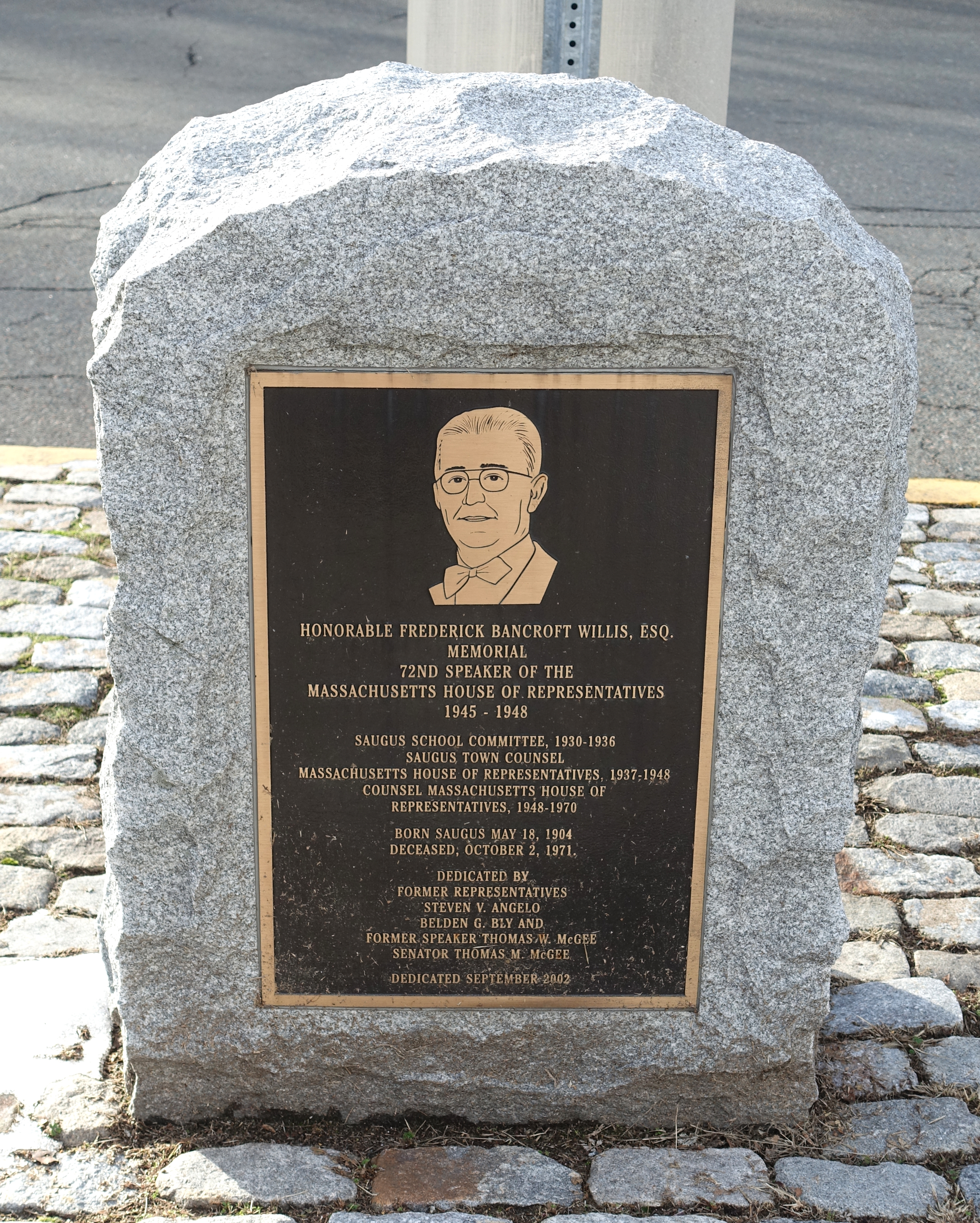
Frederick Bancroft Willis Memorial

Willis was a member of the Saugus School Committee from 1930 to 1936. He also worked as the Town Counsel and Secretary of Assessors.

From 1937 to 1949 he was a member of the Massachusetts House of Representatives. In 1939 he was appointed Chairman of the Commission on Civil Service. While serving in this role he authored the Civil Service Reform Act. From 1943 to 1944 he was the House Majority Leader, Chairman of the Special Commission on Postwar Rehabilitation, and chairman on the House Committee on Aeronautics. While on the Aeronautics Committee, Willis helped turn Logan Airport into a modern facility.

Willis was Speaker of the House from 1944 to 1948. He served as a delegate to Republican National Convention from Massachusetts in 1940 and 1948. He did not run for reelection after the 1948-49 legislative session, instead he became Counsel to the House of Representatives. Willis remained House Counsel until his retirement in 1969.

== Later life, death, and legacy ==
After leaving the House, Willis moved to Lynn, Massachusetts.

Willis died on October 2, 1971, in Lynn.

The Frederick B. Willis Fishing Pier in Lynn is dedicated to him.

== See also ==
- Massachusetts legislature: 1937–1938, 1939, 1941–1942, 1943–1944, 1945–1946, 1947–1948

Massachusetts House of Representatives
Preceded by Rudolph King	Speaker of the Massachusetts House of Representatives; 1944-1949	Succeeded by Thomas P. O'Neill
Legal offices
Preceded by Henry Dwight Wiggin	Counsel to the Massachusetts House of Representatives; 1949-1969	Succeeded by Harry Coltun
