= Leo J. Sullivan =

American politician

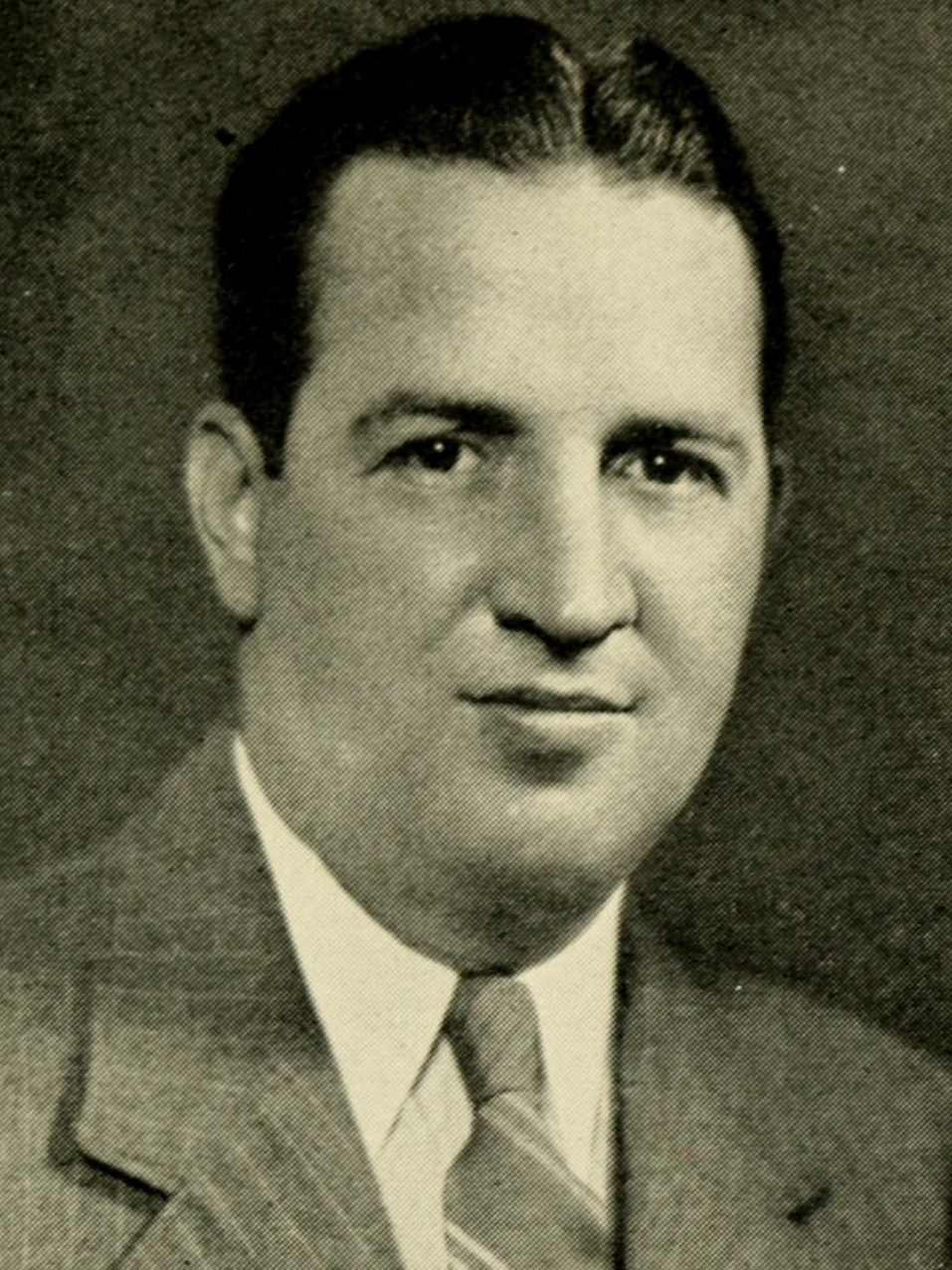
- Sullivan circa 1945

Commissioner of the Boston Police Department
- In office 1957–1962
- Preceded by: Thomas F. Sullivan
- Succeeded by: Edmund McNamara

Suffolk County Register of Deeds
- In office 1946–1957
- Preceded by: W. T. A. Fitzgerald
- Succeeded by: Joseph D. Coughlin

Member of the Massachusetts Senate from the 4th Suffolk District
- In office 1941–1947
- Preceded by: John E. Kerrigan
- Succeeded by: John E. Powers

Personal details
- Born: December 8, 1905 South Boston
- Died: February 1, 1963 (aged 57) South Boston
- Party: Democratic
- Education: Saint Anselm College

Leo J. Sullivan (December 8, 1905 – February 1, 1963) was an American government official from Boston who served as commissioner of the Boston Police Department from 1957 to 1962.

== Early life ==
Sullivan was born on December 8, 1905, in South Boston. He attended The English High School and Saint Anselm College.

== Political career ==
Sullivan began his political career in 1934 as an unsuccessful candidate for the Massachusetts House of Representatives. It would be the only defeat he suffered in his career. He was elected to the House in 1936 and served there from 1937 to 1941. From 1941 to 1947 he represented the 4th Suffolk District in the Massachusetts Senate. In 1946 he defeated 40-year incumbent W. T. A. Fitzgerald to become Suffolk County Register of Deeds. As register, Sullivan worked to modernize the office. This included photostating every document which came through the registry and making microfilms of all the records in the land division. Sullivan managed Foster Furcolo's campaign in Suffolk County during the 1956 gubernatorial election.

== Police Commissioner ==
In 1957, Furcolo appointed Sullivan to the position of Boston police commissioner. During his tenure as commissioner, Sullivan broke up the special service squad, established a juvenile squad, and eliminated 101 positions from the department (which saved the city $550,000 a year). He supported consolidation of stations and opposed legislation to return the department under city control.

In 1961, CBS aired a program called "Biography of a Bookie Joint", which showed police officers entering and exiting Swartz's Key Shop, an illegal gambling parlor. After the broadcast, Governor John A. Volpe hired James D. St. Clair to prepare removal proceedings against Sullivan. After Sullivan refused to resign, Volpe brought him before the Massachusetts Governor's Council's on charges of splitting renovation and repair contracts, failing to advertise contract bids, engaging in the insurance business while serving as commissioner, and neglecting his duty by not ordering an investigation into the officers who were filmed visiting Swartz's Key Shop. Sullivan resigned on March 15, 1962, during the hearings on his removal.

== Death ==
Sullivan died on February 1, 1963, at his home in South Boston.

== See also ==
- Massachusetts legislature: 1937–1938, 1939, 1941–1942, 1943–1944, 1945–1946
