= Edward Rowe (politician) =

American politician

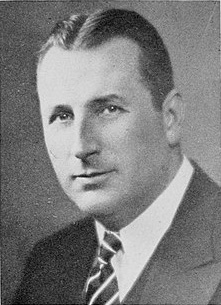
- Edward Rowe, circa 1945

Member of the Massachusetts Senate from the 2nd Middlesex District
- In office 1943–1949
- Preceded by: Arthur F. Blanchard
- Succeeded by: Daniel F. O'Brien

Personal details
- Born: March 17, 1902 Indianapolis, Indiana
- Died: December 16, 1971 (aged 69) Cambridge, Massachusetts
- Party: Republican

Edward M. Rowe (March 17, 1902 – December 16, 1971) was an American politician who served in the Massachusetts Senate and was a two-time candidate for Governor of Massachusetts.

== Early life ==
Rowe was born on March 17, 1902, in Indianapolis, Indiana. He graduated from Harvard College in 1927 and Harvard Law School in 1931. Rowe remained in Cambridge, Massachusetts after graduating from Harvard.

== Political career ==
In 1942, Rowe was elected to represent the 2nd Middlesex District in the Massachusetts Senate. In 1948 he ran for Governor of Massachusetts, accusing incumbent Republican Governor Robert F. Bradford of being in an "unwholesome political alliance" with Boston Mayor James Michael Curley. Bradford defeated Rowe by a 5 to 1 margin to win the Republican nomination. On November 27, 1948, was critically injured in a hit and run accident in Back Bay. He eventually recovered. In 1950, Rowe again ran for Governor. He finished last in the six candidate primary with 2% of the vote.

== Death ==
Rowe died on December 16, 1971, at his home in Cambridge.

== See also ==
- Massachusetts legislature: 1943–1944, 1945–1946, 1947–1948
