= Patrick J. McDonough =

American politician

Patrick J. "Sonny" McDonough
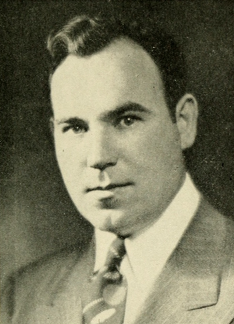
- McDonough in 1945

Member of the Massachusetts Governor's Council for the Fourth District
- In office 1947–1980
- Preceded by: John J. Sawtelle
- Succeeded by: Peter Eleey

Member of the Massachusetts House of Representatives for the 7th Suffolk District
- In office 1941–1947

Personal details
- Born: April 29, 1911 South Boston, Massachusetts
- Died: June 9, 1980 (aged 69) Plymouth, Massachusetts
- Party: Democratic

Patrick Joseph "Sonny" McDonough (April 29, 1911 – June 9, 1980) was an American politician who served as a member of the Massachusetts Governor's Council and the Massachusetts House of Representatives.

== Early life and career ==
McDonough was born on April 29, 1911, in South Boston. He dropped out of high school to support his family after his father became ill. Prior to entering politics he worked in a sugar refinery and was an electrician's helper. He also tutored in law for three years and was an assistant clerk to Judge William J. Day, father of Louise Day Hicks.

== Political career ==
On his 21st birthday, McDonough was elected chairman of the Ward 7 Democratic Committee. In 1934 he was elected to the Democratic State Committee. From 1935 to 1943 he was its vice-chairman. In 1940 he was hired by the Congress of Industrial Organizations's political action committee to run its organizing drive in New England.

From 1941 to 1947, McDonough was a member of the Massachusetts House of Representatives. In 1949 he was a candidate for Mayor of Boston. He finished third with 7% of the vote behind John Hynes and James Michael Curley.

In 1946, McDonough was elected to the Massachusetts Governor's Council. In 1964 he fought against an effort to reduce the Council's power. The effort was unsuccessful, as a referendum that greatly reduced the council's powers passed. In 1975 he led a successful fight against Governor Michael Dukakis bid to eliminate the council. He also fought against Walter Jay Skinner's nomination for a Superior Court judgeship. Skinner, as assistant attorney general, had prosecuted several of McDonough's fellow councilors for extortion.

McDonough was a candidate for Governor of Massachusetts in 1954 and 1956, but lost the Democratic nomination at the party's convention both times.

== Business career ==
In the early 1930s, McDonough found success as a beer distributor. He later expanded his business to include five package stores. Prior to running for Mayor, McDonough left the liquor business and went into insurance. He also had extensive real estate interests in Marathon, Florida, where he had a winter home.

== Personal life ==
In the late 1960s, McDonough moved from Boston to Scituate, Massachusetts. He rented an apartment in Dorchester to maintain residence in his council district. He later moved to Plymouth, Massachusetts, where he died on June 9, 1980. He was survived by his wife and five children.

== See also ==
- Massachusetts legislature: 1941–1942, 1943–1944, 1945–1946
