= Joseph L. Murphy =

American politician

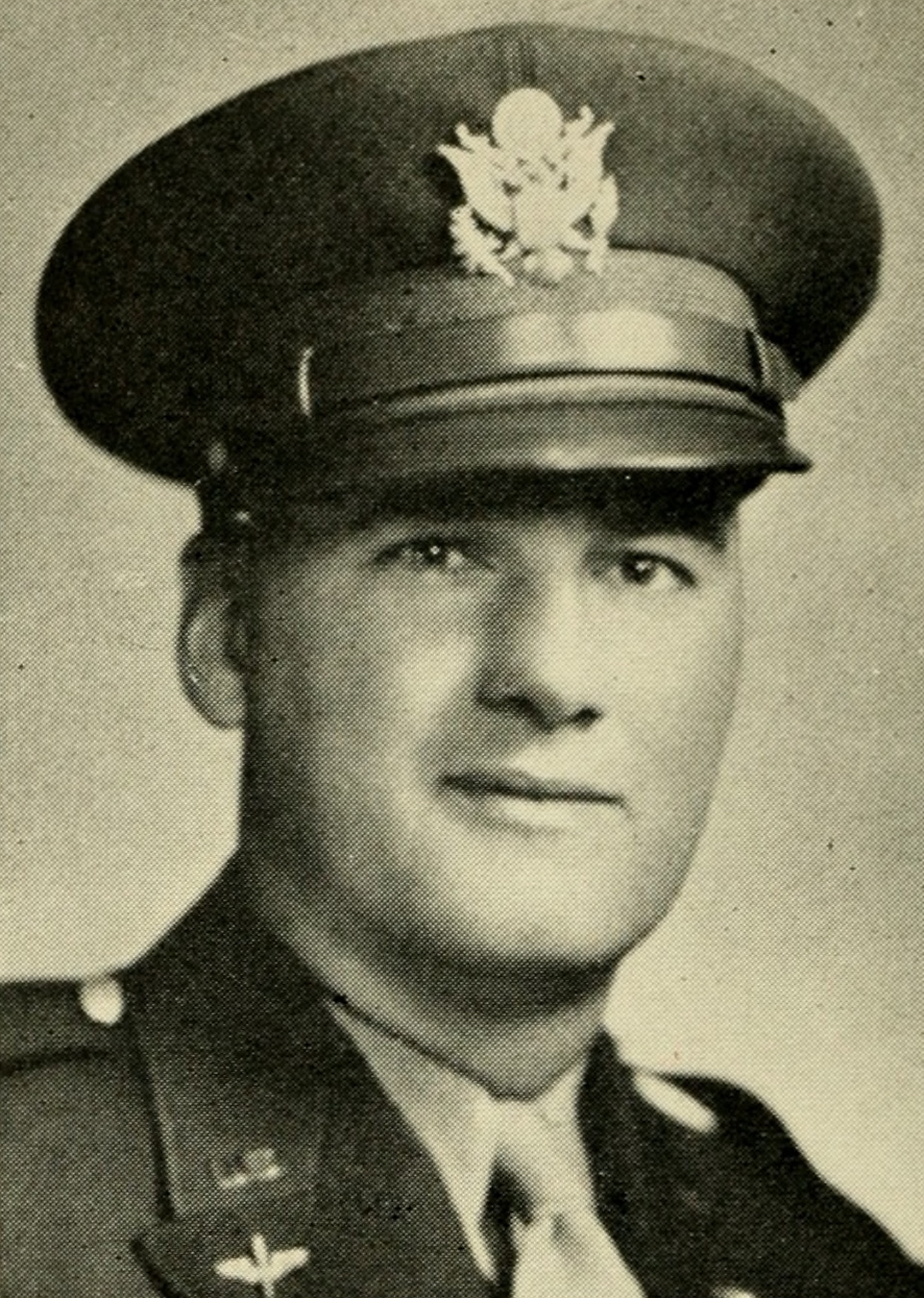

Minority Leader of the Massachusetts Senate
- In office 1945–1947
- Preceded by: William E. Nolen
- Succeeded by: Chester A. Dolan Jr.

Member of the Massachusetts Senate from the 7th Suffolk District
- In office 1939–1949
- Preceded by: Joseph P. Donahue
- Succeeded by: William Joseph Keenan

Member of the Massachusetts House of Representatives from the 16th Suffolk District
- In office 1935–1939

Personal details
- Born: January 25, 1907 South Boston, Boston, Massachusetts
- Died: October 4, 1973 (aged 66) Cambridge, Massachusetts
- Party: Democratic

Joseph Leo Murphy (January 25, 1907 – October 4, 1973) was an American politician who served in the Massachusetts General Court.

== Early life ==
Murphy was born on January 25, 1907, in South Boston. He graduated from Dorchester High School and Boston University. Outside of politics, Murphy worked as an automobile salesman.

== Politics ==
Murphy's political career began in 1934 when he was elected to the Massachusetts House of Representatives. In 1938 he was elected to the Massachusetts Senate. He was reelected in 1940 while serving overseas in the United States Army Air Corps. In 1941, Murphy filed legislation to place professional wrestling under the jurisdiction of the state boxing commission. He contended that wrestling was "a racket" and that even he could beat World Heavyweight Champion The French Angel. Paul Bowser challenged Murphy to fight "The Angel" and Murphy accepted. One of Murphy's senate colleagues, Chester A. Dolan, signed papers to be his manager. The match, however, never took place. In 1945, Murphy was elected Democratic floor leader. He was defeated by William Joseph Keenan in the 1948 Democratic primary.

In 1952, Murphy ran for Lieutenant Governor of Massachusetts. He finished third in the six-candidate Democratic primary with 13% of the vote.

In 1954 he for the United States Senate seat held by Leverett Saltonstall. He lost the Democratic nomination to State Treasurer Foster Furcolo.

In 1964, Murphy was a candidate for Governor of Massachusetts, but his name was ruled off the ballot due to a dispute over signatures on his nomination papers.

== Later life ==
Murphy was a founder of Berkshire Downs in Hanover, Massachusetts. In 1962 he initiated a lawsuit that resulted in a complex legal battle over the track's ownership. He later went to work as an administrative assistant for the Metropolitan District Commission. Murphy died on October 4, 1973, at Cambridge Hospital.

== See also ==
- Massachusetts legislature: 1935–1936, 1937–1938, 1939, 1941–1942, 1943–1944, 1945–1946, 1947–1948
