= Paul W. Foster =

American newspaper publisher and government official (1893-1952)

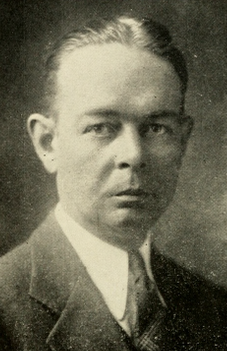

Chairman of the Commission of Administration and Finance
- In office 1942–1945
- Preceded by: Angier Goodwin
- Succeeded by: Thomas H. Buckley

Member of the Massachusetts House of Representatives for the 5th Berkshire district
- In office 1937–1942

Personal details
- Born: April 19, 1893 Wakefield, Massachusetts
- Died: December 11, 1958 (aged 65) Great Barrington, Massachusetts
- Party: Republican
- Occupation: Newspaper publisher

Paul W. Foster (April 19, 1893 – December 11, 1958) was an American newspaper publisher and government official who was a member of the Massachusetts House of Representatives and chairman of the state Commission of Administration and Finance.

== Early life ==
Foster was born on April 19, 1893, in Wakefield, Massachusetts. He graduated from Searles High School in Great Barrington, Massachusetts.

== Publishing ==
Foster was the son of newspaper owner and publisher Maitland P. Foster. He began his career with his father's paper, the Littleton Courier. In 1911, he joined the staff of another of his father's papers, the Berkshire Courier. The Fosters also published the Berkshire Gleaner until 1942, when the paper was shut down for financial reasons.

== Government ==
Foster held a number of public offices in Great Barrington. He was a member of the town's finance committee, board of assessors, board of selectmen and was the town tax collector. From 1937 to 1942, he represented the 5th Berkshire district in the Massachusetts House of Representatives. In 1942, he was appointed chairman of the state Commission of Administration and Finance by Governor Leverett Saltonstall. He was replaced by Saltonstall's successor, Maurice J. Tobin, in 1945.

== Later life ==
After leaving state office, Foster was the executive director of the Berkshire Hills Conference. He died on December 11, 1958, in Great Barrington.
