= William Arthur Reilly =

American politician (1903-1969)

Deputy Mayor of Boston
- In office 1957–1960
- Preceded by: John A. Breen
- Succeeded by: John P. McMorrow

Boston Traffic Commissioner
- In office 1950–1957
- Preceded by: Leo Curley
- Succeeded by: Joe O'Connor

Boston Fire Commissioner
- In office 1938–1945
- Preceded by: Edward F. McLaughlin
- Succeeded by: John I. Fitzgerald

Personal details
- Born: March 6, 1903 Roxbury
- Died: April 3, 1969 (aged 66) Dorchester
- Party: Democratic

William Arthur Reilly (March 6, 1903 – April 3, 1969) was an American political figure from Boston who served as the city's deputy mayor and fire commissioner and was member of the school committee and finance commission.

== Early life ==
Reilly was born on March 6, 1903, in Roxbury. He attended High School of Commerce, where he started a friendship with Maurice J. Tobin. After two years, Reilly transferred to Boston College High School. He went on to attend Boston College, where he was president of his class for three years, played on the Boston College Eagles football team, and was a regional champion in the 45-yard hurdles. After graduating in 1925, Reilly became manager of his father's church music publishing business.

== Political career ==
In 1929, Reilly was elected to the Boston school committee. At the age of 26 he was the youngest person elected to the board at that time. In 1931 he became chairman of the board. He was the youngest person to hold this position as well. In 1933, he ran for Mayor of Boston. On October 5, he announced that he was dropping out of the race, stating that "The present large number of strong candidates may permit the election of an inferior candidate". The nine candidate field included Frederick W. Mansfield, Malcolm E. Nichols, William J. Foley, Henry Parkman Jr., and Joseph F. O'Connell. Reilly chose not to back any candidate following his withdrawal from the election.

In 1935, Reilly was appointed to the Boston Finance Commission. He resigned later that year. In 1937 he worked on the Mayoral campaign of Maurice J. Tobin. Following Tobin's election, Reilly was appointed fire commissioner. At 34, he was the youngest man to hold this office. During his tenure, the department fought and investigated the Cocoanut Grove fire - deadliest nightclub fire in history. In 1945, Tobin, now Governor of Massachusetts, nominated Reilly to be chairman of the Metropolitan District Commission. His appointment was blocked by Lieutenant Governor Robert F. Bradford and two Democratic members of the Massachusetts Governor's Council. In 1945, Reilly ran for Mayor of Boston. He finished in third place behind James Michael Curley and John E. Kerrigan with 19% of the vote.

In 1950, Mayor John B. Hynes appointed Reilly to the position of traffic commissioner. Hynes promoted him to deputy mayor and director of administrative services in 1957. Reilly retired from government when Hynes left office in 1960.

Reilly died on April 3, 1969, in Boston.
