= Alyce Louise Schlapp =

American politician

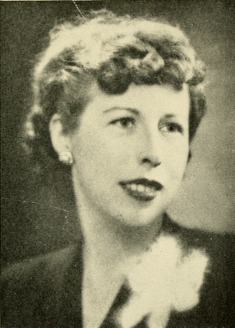

Member of the Massachusetts House of Representatives from the 4th Essex district
- In office 1943–1946

Personal details
- Born: Alyce Louise Gage; November 30, 1912 Pelham, New Hampshire
- Died: 1999
- Party: Republican
- Spouse: Raymond W. Schlapp
- Education: University of New Hampshire

Alyce Louise Schlapp (November 30, 1912 – 1999) was an American politician who represented the 4th Essex District in the Massachusetts House of Representatives as a Republican from 1943 to 1946. She was elected to succeed her husband, representative Raymond W. Schlapp, in order to continue her husband's work during his military service.
