= Louis F. O'Keefe =

American politician (1895–1965)

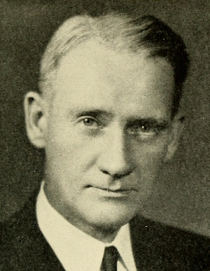
- official portrait, circa 1945

Member of the Massachusetts House of Representatives
- In office 1943–1951
- Preceded by: Joseph F. Luz
- Succeeded by: John E. Murphy
- Constituency: 9th Essex (1943–1949); 10th Essex (1949–1951)

Peabody City Solicitor
- In office 1929–1934

Member of the Peabody City Council
- In office 1923–1924

Member of the Peabody School Committee
- In office 1920–1922

Personal details
- Born: June 12, 1895 Lowell, Massachusetts, U.S.
- Died: July 10, 1965 (aged 70) Chelsea, Massachusetts, U.S.
- Resting place: St. Mary's Cemetery; Salem, Massachusetts, U.S.
- Party: Democratic
- Education: Boston University School of Law
- Occupation: Lawyer

Louis Francis O'Keefe (June 12, 1895 – July 10, 1965) was an American attorney and politician who was a member of the Massachusetts House of Representatives and a city solicitor and city councilor in Peabody, Massachusetts.

== Early life ==
O'Keefe was born on June 12, 1895, in Lowell, Massachusetts. He attended public schools in Peabody and graduated from the Boston University School of Law. He served in the United States Navy during World War I.

== Politics ==
O'Keefe was a member of the Peabody school committee from 1920 to 1922. From 1923 to 1924 he was a member of the city council. From 1929 to 1934 he was city solicitor. He was a member of the Massachusetts House of Representatives from 1943 to 1951. He was defeated for reelection in 1950 and was appointed to the newly formed department of mental health board of appeals by Governor Paul A. Dever shortly after leaving office. He resigned on December 2, 1952, amid a Massachusetts Senate investigation into allegations that O'Keefe and board chair Kathleen Ryan Dacey had collected pay for meetings that were never held.

== Death ==
O'Keefe died on July 10, 1965, at Quigley Memorial Hospital in Chelsea, Massachusetts. He was survived by his wife and three sons.
