= Charles J. Artesani =

Massachusetts politician (1911–1992)

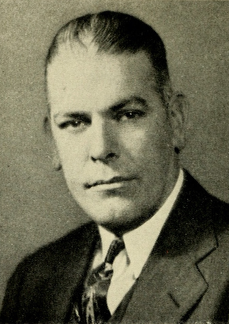

Member of the Massachusetts House of Representatives from the 22nd Suffolk district
- In office 1941–1958

Personal details
- Born: July 30, 1911 Brighton, Massachusetts
- Died: January 12, 1992 (aged 80) Newton, Massachusetts
- Education: Boston College (BA); Harvard Law School (LLB)

Charles J. Artesani (July 30, 1911– January 12, 1992) was an American politician who was the member of the Massachusetts House of Representatives from the 21st Suffolk district.
