= Carl A. Sheridan =

American attorney and government official (1908-1989)

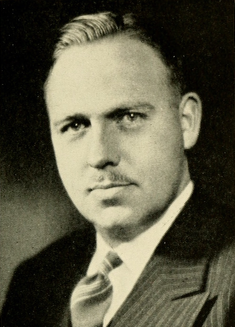

Massachusetts Commissioner of Public Works
- In office 1956–1957
- Preceded by: John A. Volpe
- Succeeded by: Anthony N. DiNatale

Massachusetts Commissioner of Administration and Finance
- In office 1953–1956
- Preceded by: Thomas H. Buckley
- Succeeded by: Francis X. Lang

Member of the Massachusetts Governor's Council for the 3rd District
- In office 1945–1947
- Preceded by: Frank A. Brooks
- Succeeded by: Otis M. Whitney

Member of the Massachusetts House of Representatives for the 8th Middlesex District
- In office 1941–1945

Personal details
- Born: March 24, 1908 Framingham, Massachusetts
- Died: January 29, 1989 (aged 80)
- Party: Republican
- Education: Antioch College; Suffolk Law School
- Occupation: Attorney

Carl A. Sheridan (March 24, 1908 – January 29, 1989) was an American attorney and government official who was a member of the Massachusetts House of Representatives and Massachusetts Governor's Council and served as commissioner of administration and finance and commissioner of public works.

== Early life ==
Sheridan was born on March 24, 1908, in Framingham, Massachusetts. He attended Framingham public schools, Antioch College, and Suffolk Law School.

== Political career ==
Sheridan represented the 8th Middlesex District in the from 1941 until 1945, when he was appointed a vacancy on the Massachusetts Governor's Council caused by the death of Frank A. Brooks. He did not seek reelection and was succeeded by Otis M. Whitney.

In 1953, Sheridan was appointed commissioner of administration and finance by Governor Christian Herter. In 1956, Herter appointed Sheridan to fill the unexpired term of public works commissioner John A. Volpe. He left the public works department in 1957 to return to the private sector.

== Later life ==
After leaving state government, Sheridan worked as an attorney and served as Framingham's town moderator. He died on January 29, 1989.
