= John E. Kerrigan =

American politician

- Kerrigan, circa 1939

Acting Mayor of Boston
- In office January 4, 1945 – January 7, 1946
- Preceded by: Maurice J. Tobin
- Succeeded by: James Michael Curley

Member of the Massachusetts Senate for the Fourth Suffolk District
- In office January 1939 – January 1941
- Preceded by: Edward C. Carroll
- Succeeded by: Leo J. Sullivan

Personal details
- Born: October 1, 1908 Boston, Massachusetts
- Died: May 2, 1987 (aged 78) Boston, Massachusetts
- Party: Democratic

John E. Kerrigan (October 1, 1908 – May 2, 1987) was an American politician, the acting mayor of Boston in 1945 after then-Mayor Maurice J. Tobin became governor of Massachusetts.

== Biography ==
Kerrigan was born on October 1, 1908, and was a graduate of South Boston High School.

== Early career ==
He began serving on the Boston City Council in 1933. He was council president in 1938, 1944, and 1945. As council president, Kerrigan was acting mayor during the Hurricane of 1938 due to Mayor Maurice J. Tobin being on a speaking tour in the West Coast. He also served one term in the Massachusetts Senate, 1939–1941.

== Mayoralty ==
As president of the Council in 1945, Kerrigan became acting Mayor of Boston upon the inauguration of Maurice J. Tobin, who had been mayor since 1938, as governor. Initially with limited authority, Kerrigan was given full mayoral powers by the Massachusetts legislature on January 25, 1945. His mayoralty was defined by shortages and debt due to the postwar climate. He passed a bill that saved Boston taxpayers approximately $12 million over the next 20 years by refinancing the bonded debt from the Sumner Tunnel. He also was able to increase the city's income by leasing the Houghton & Dutton department store on Tremont Street to the federal government. He promoted many long-term construction programs to spur growth within the city. He was defeated in the November 1945 mayoral election by James Michael Curley. Kerrigan served as acting mayor in January 1946, until Curley was inaugurated.

== Retirement and death ==
Kerrigan retired from the City Council in 1973, having served a total of 15 terms, non-consecutively. He died on May 2, 1987, of cardiac arrest at Boston City Hospital. He had never married.

== See also ==
- 1939 Massachusetts legislature
- Timeline of Boston, 1930s–1940s

Political offices
Preceded by Maurice Tobin	Mayor of Boston, Massachusetts (acting); 1945–1946	Succeeded by James Michael Curley
Preceded by John I. Fitzgerald; Thomas J. Hannon	President of the Boston City Council; 1938; 1944–1945	Succeeded by George A. Murray; John B. Kelly
Preceded by Edward C. Carroll	Member of the Massachusetts Senate from the 4th Suffolk District; 1939–1941	Succeeded by Leo J. Sullivan
