= Charles E. Shepard =

American government official in Massachusetts

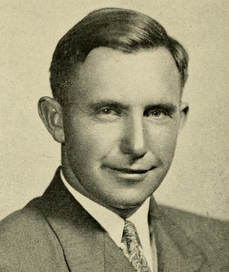

Massachusetts Commissioner/Secretary of Administration and Finance
- In office 1970–1971
- Preceded by: Donald Dwight
- Succeeded by: Robert Yasi

Member of the Massachusetts House of Representatives for the 4th Worcester district
- In office 1941–1947

Personal details
- Born: September 21, 1901 Warren, Massachusetts
- Died: September 9, 1992 (aged 90) West Brookfield, Massachusetts
- Resting place: Pine Grove Cemetery; Warren, Massachusetts
- Party: Republican
- Education: Bay Path Institute
- Occupation: Farmer

Charles E. Shepard (September 21, 1901 – September 9, 1992) was an American government official who was the first Secretary of Administration and Finance of Massachusetts.

== Early life ==
Shepard was born on September 21, 1901, in Warren, Massachusetts. He was a seventh generation dairy farmer and lived and worked on Elm View Farm in Warren for most of his life. He graduated from Warren High School and the Bay Path Institute in Springfield, Massachusetts.

== Government service ==
From 1935 to 1943, Shepard was a member of the Warren finance committee. He was elected to the Massachusetts House of Representatives in 1940, and was re-elected in 1942 and 1944. During his final term he was vice chairman of the Ways and Means Committee and helped modernize the state's budgeting process. Rather than run for reelection in 1946, Shepard became the first ever budget director of the House Ways and Means Committee. In 1965 he was appointed deputy commissioner for fiscal affairs in the department of Administration and Finance by Governor John A. Volpe. In June 1970 he was promoted to the Commissioner of Administration and Finance by Acting Governor Francis Sargent. When the position was reorganized into a cabinet-level office the following year, Shepard became the first Secretary of Administration and Finance of Massachusetts. He retired on September 27, 1971.

== Later life ==
After retiring, Shepard was a part-time consultant on state finances to the Massachusetts Taxpayers Foundation. He died on September 9, 1992, at a nursing home in West Brookfield, Massachusetts after a yearlong battle with cancer.
