= George W. Stanton =

American politician (1886–1965)

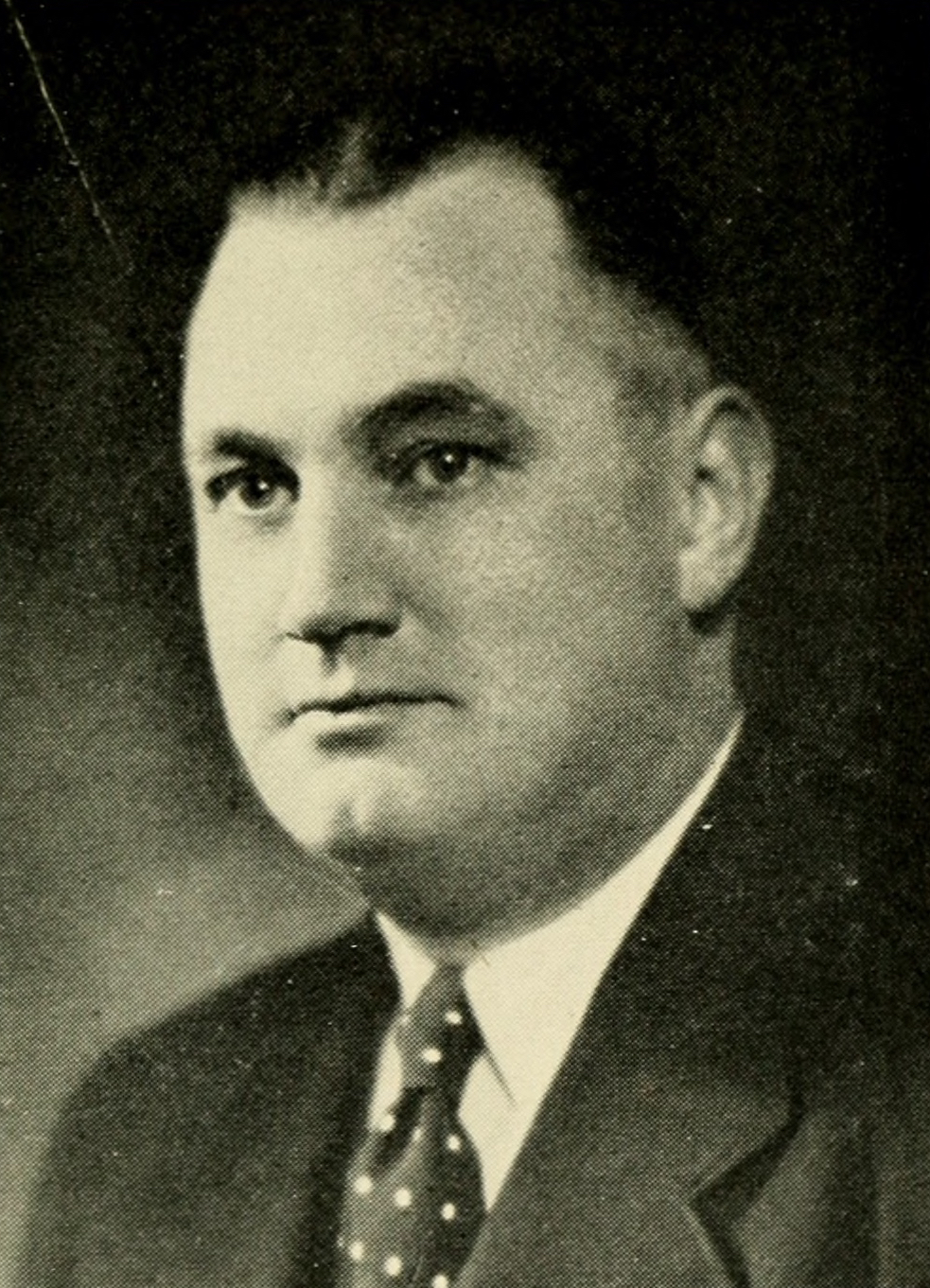

Member of the Massachusetts Senate for the 3rd Worcester District
- In office 1941–1952
- Preceded by: Edward H. Nutting
- Succeeded by: Elizabeth Stanton
- In office 1937–1937
- Preceded by: Edward H. Nutting
- Succeeded by: Edward H. Nutting

Mayor of Fitchburg, Massachusetts
- In office 1948–1949
- Preceded by: Alfred Woollacott
- Succeeded by: Peter J. Levanti

Personal details
- Born: January 18, 1903 Fitchburg, Massachusetts
- Died: April 24, 1952 (aged 49) Fitchburg, Massachusetts
- Party: Democratic
- Spouse: Elizabeth Dormin (1941–1952; his death)
- Occupation: Real estate broker

George William Stanton (January 18, 1903 – April 24, 1952) was an American politician who served as mayor of Fitchburg, Massachusetts and was a member of the Massachusetts Senate.

== Early life ==
Stanton was born on January 18, 1903, in Fitchburg. He was educated in the Fitchburg public schools and worked as a real estate broker.

== Political career ==
Stanton ran for the 3rd Worcester district seat in the Massachusetts Senate in 1936. Incumbent Edward R. Nutting was initially declared the winner, but a recount later gave Stanton a five-vote victory over Nutting. Nutting challenged Stanton's victory to the Senate's election committee, which found that Nutting had won by 8 votes. On March 9, 1937, the Senate voted on party lines to remove Stanton from office and seat Nutting. It was the first time in Senate history that a member had been removed as a result of a protested election.

Stanton returned to the Senate in 1941 and also served as mayor of Fitchburg in 1948 and 1949. In January 1952, Stanton suffered serious injuries in an automobile accident which kept him from the Senate. Three months later he was hospitalized after an asthma attack. He died on April 24, 1952, in Burbank Hospital. He was succeeded in the Senate by his widow, Elizabeth Stanton.
