= 1930 United States Senate election in Massachusetts =

- November 4, 1930
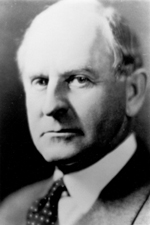

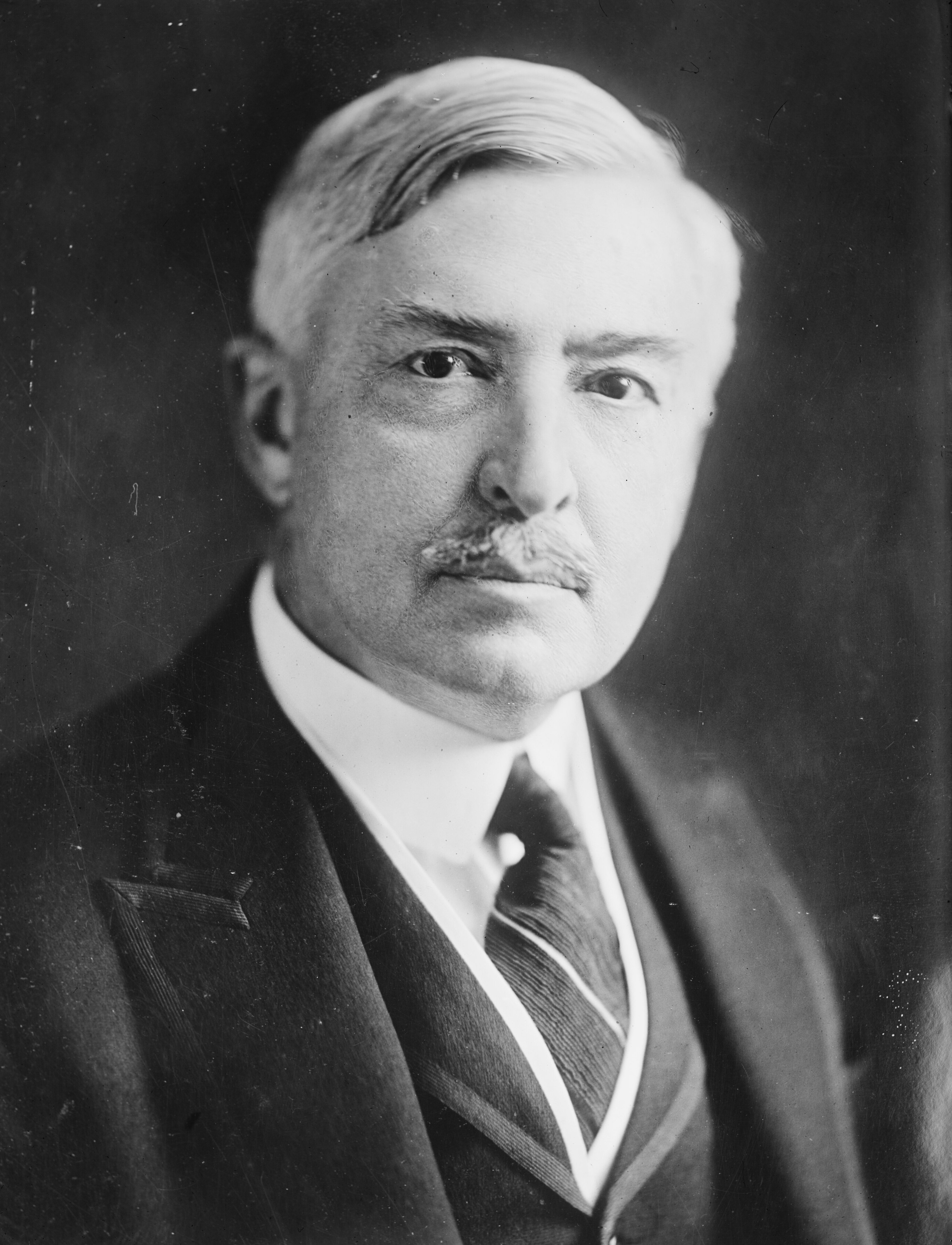
Nominee	Marcus A. Coolidge	William M. Butler
Party	Democratic	Republican
Popular vote	651,939	539,226
Percentage	54.01%	44.67%
- Coolidge: 40–50% 50–60% 60–70% 70–80% Butler: 40–50% 50–60% 60–70% 70–80% 80–90% >90%
Senator before election
Frederick H. Gillett
Republican
Elected Senator
Marcus A. Coolidge
Democratic

The United States Senate election of 1930 in Massachusetts was held on November 4, 1930. Republican incumbent Frederick H. Gillett did not run for re-election. In the open race to succeed him, Fitchburg mayor Marcus A. Coolidge defeated former senator William M. Butler.

== Background ==
Prior to 1928, Massachusetts was viewed as a conservative, solidly Republican state.

However, the Democratic Party nominated New York governor Al Smith, a Roman Catholic and outspoken opponent of the prohibition of alcohol, for president in 1928. Smith's campaign drew many of the state's growing urban, immigrant, working class, and Catholic populations to the polls, and although he lost a national landslide to Herbert Hoover, Smith won Massachusetts in a highly competitive race. The 1928 election permanently altered the demographics of the Massachusetts electorate, and the state was highly competitive into the 1940s.

== Republican primary ==
=== Candidates ===
- William M. Butler, former interim U.S. senator (1924–26)
- Eben Draper Jr., former state senator from Hopedale, son of governor Eben Draper, and candidate for Senate in 1928
- Andrew J. Gillis, mayor of Newburyport

==== Withdrew ====
- Alvan T. Fuller, former governor of Massachusetts (1925–29)

==== Declined ====
- Calvin Coolidge, former president of the United States (1923–29)
- Frederick Gillett, incumbent U.S. senator since 1925

In 1929, growing opposition formed against renominating Frederick Gillett for a second term. Former governor Alvan Fuller publicly announced that he would oppose Gillett's nomination and insisted that other Republican candidates would also enter the primary. Party insiders sought to avoid a contentious primary, fearing that it would increase the chances of a loss to the Democratic Party. In December 1929, Gillett announced his retirement, citing old age. Calvin Coolidge was speculated as a potential candidate, and Eben Draper Jr. announced plans to run.

On February 18, Fuller announced his intention to personally run for the seat. Fuller publicly opposed any pre-primary convention, accusing the Republican Party state committee of being a "corrupt outfit." He also declared his opposition to Republican senators William Scott Vare and Hiram Bingham III, who had both been censured by the Senate.

On March 13, former senator William Butler formally announced a campaign, running as an unreserved, "bone-dry" supporter of prohibition.

=== Campaign ===
By March 1930, the campaign had shaped around a divide between Butler and Draper over prohibition. Draper announced his unequivocal opposition to prohibition, including the repeal of the Eighteenth Amendment to the United States Constitution, on March 26. Butler soon criticized Draper for changing his position and failing to uphold the Constitution. As the campaign went on, Butler de-emphasized his position on prohibition, instead focusing on his support for business in the wake of the 1929 stock market crash.

In the campaign's final week, Constance Williams, the daughter of the late Senator Henry Cabot Lodge, accused Butler of politically abusing her late father in his final years. After Butler publicly claimed to have been friendly with Senator Lodge and declared himself Lodge's ideal successor, Williams publicly denounced Butler's candidacy and claimed Butler held a long grudge against her father stemming from his defeat of Butler's preferred candidate, William W. Crapo, in the 1893 Senate election.

=== Results ===
Republican primary
Party	Candidate	Votes	%
Republican	William M. Butler	163,336	47.61%
Republican	Eben S. Draper Jr.	156,745	45.69%
Republican	Andrew J. Gillis	22,996	6.70%
Total votes		343,077	100.00%

Despite the late attack against him and the general sentiment for prohibition repeal in the state, Butler narrowly defeated Draper by just under 6,600 votes.

Draper got a much smaller than expected margin in the cities, winning Boston by only 200 votes. Draper's loss was also attributed to the spoiler effect, with Newburyport mayor Andrew Gillis pulling 20,000 wet votes away.

== Democratic primary ==
=== Candidates ===
- Marcus A. Coolidge, former mayor of Fitchburg
- Eugene Foss, former governor of Massachusetts and U.S. representative
- Peter J. Joyce, manufacturer
- Thomas C. O'Brien, former Suffolk County district attorney
- Joseph F. O'Connell, former U.S. representative from Boston

==== Withdrew ====
- Roland D. Sawyer, state representative from Ware and Congregationalist minister

=== Campaign ===
Roland D. Sawyer entered the race as a wet candidate on March 25. The next two candidates to formally announce, Marcus A. Coolidge and Joseph F. O'Connell, joined the campaign on May 11. Coolidge also ran as a wet, while O'Connell said he would announce his platform at a later date, expressing confidence that Democrats would carry the state in November.

Coolidge faced some difficulty winning over the party's Catholic base; he was a Protestant who had supported William Gibbs McAdoo over Al Smith for president in 1924, though he had actively campaigned for Smith in 1928. Coolidge overcame this deficiency by tying his campaign to that of the aging Irish Catholic icon John F. Fitzgerald for Governor, but he suffered a major setback when Fitzgerald withdrew due to illness. The paper Coolidge-Fitzgerald ticket was buoyed when Boston mayor James Michael Curley declared that Fitzgerald's Protestant opponent was anti-Irish.

=== Results ===
Democratic primary
Party	Candidate	Votes	%
Democratic	Marcus A. Coolidge	81,451	40.71%
Democratic	Joseph F. O'Connell	54,829	27.41%
Democratic	Thomas C. O'Brien	45,272	22.63%
Democratic	Eugene Foss	12,824	6.41%
Democratic	Peter J. Joyce	5,680	2.84%
Total votes		200,056	100.00%

== General election ==
=== Candidates ===
- William M. Butler, former interim U.S. senator (Republican)
- Marcus A. Coolidge, former mayor of Fitchburg (Democratic)
- Oscar Kinsalas, candidate for secretary of the commonwealth in 1928 (Socialist Workers)
- Max Lerner, candidate for Massachusetts attorney general in 1928 (Communist)
- Sylvester J. McBride, perennial candidate (Socialist)

=== Results ===
General election
Party	Candidate	Votes	%	±%
Democratic	Marcus A. Coolidge	651,939	54.01%	▲5.40
Republican	William M. Butler	539,226	44.67%	▼5.59
Socialist	Sylvester J. McBride	7,244	0.60%	N/A
Socialist Labor	Oscar Kinsalas	4,640	0.38%	N/A
Communist	Max Lerner	3,962	0.34%	▼0.80
Total votes		1,207,011	100.00%	

== See also ==
- 1930 United States Senate elections
