= 1924 United States Senate election in Massachusetts =

- November 4, 1924
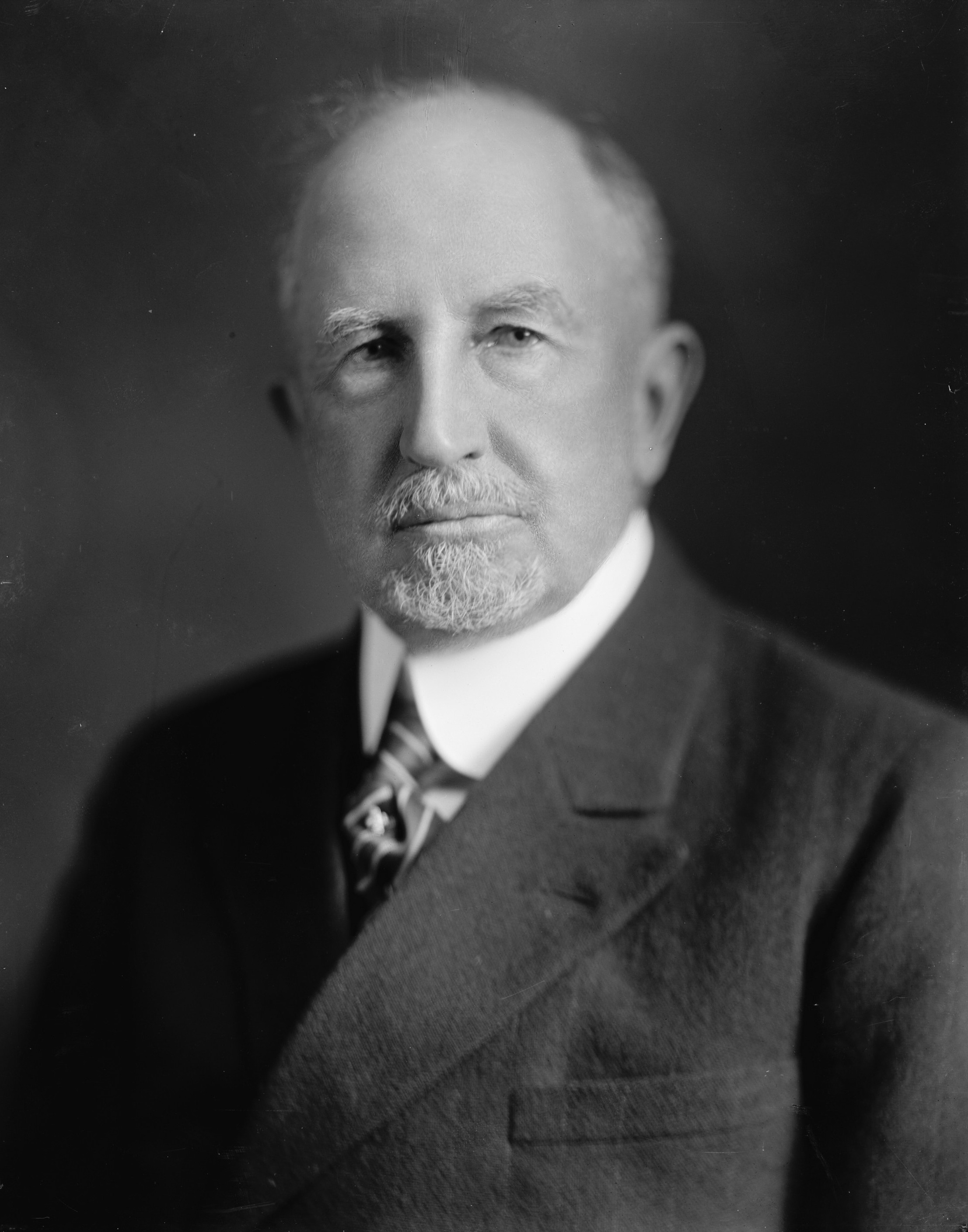

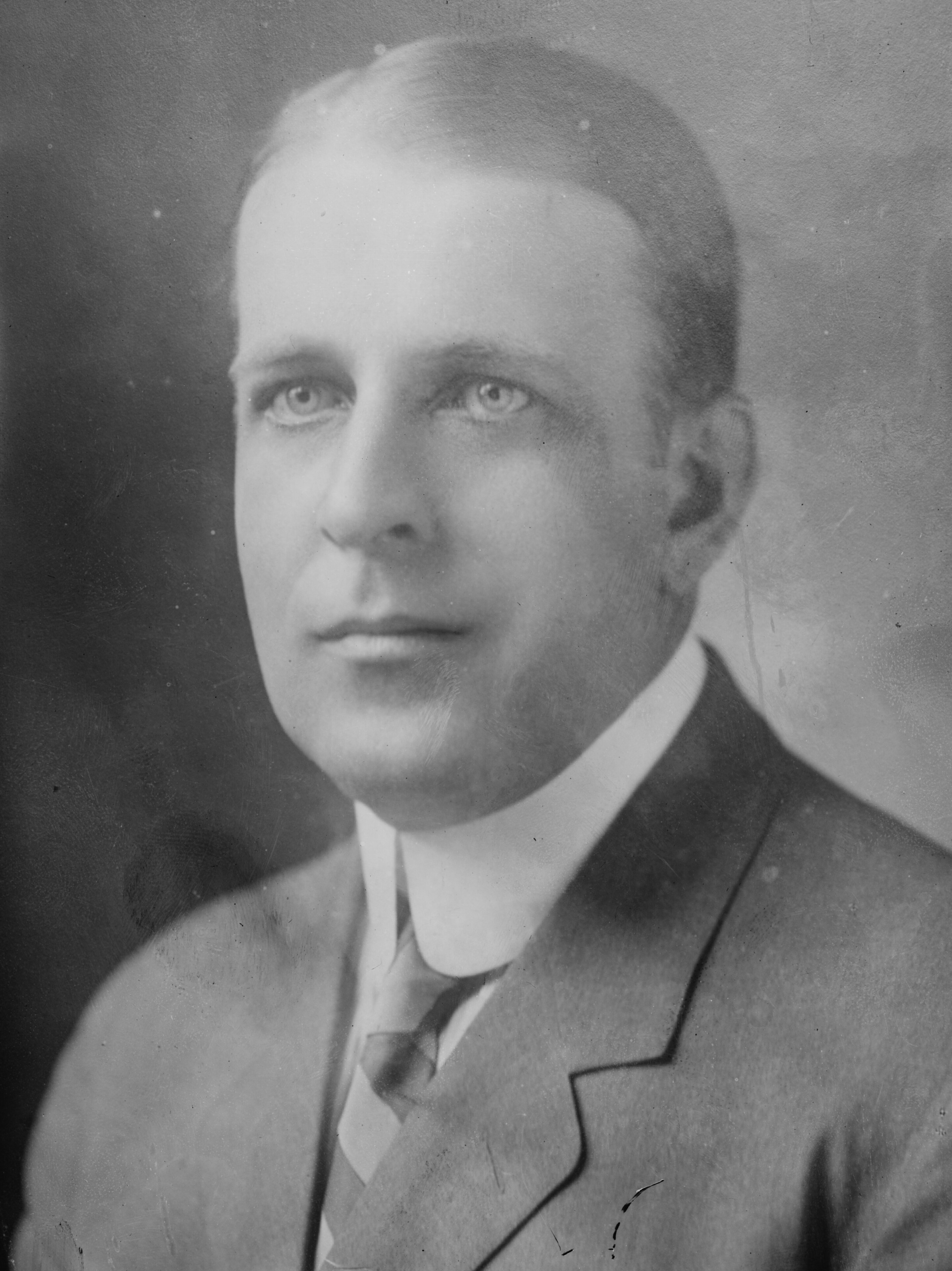
Nominee	Frederick H. Gillett	David I. Walsh
Party	Republican	Democratic
Popular vote	566,188	547,600
Percentage	50.26%	48.61%
- Gillett: 40–50% 50–60% 60–70% 70–80% 80–90% >90% Walsh: 40–50% 50–60% 60–70% 70–80%
Senator before election
David I. Walsh
Democratic
Elected Senator
Frederick H. Gillett
Republican

The United States Senate election of 1924 in Massachusetts was held on November 4, 1924. Incumbent Democratic Senator David I. Walsh, first elected in 1918, ran for a second term in office but was defeated by the Republican nominee, incumbent Speaker of the U.S. House Frederick H. Gillett. Despite winning 13 out of 14 counties in the state, Gillett was only able to win a narrow margin of 1.7%, which was largely due to Walsh's strong performance in Suffolk County, home to the state capital of Boston, likely being carried over by fellow Republican Calvin Coolidge's strong performance in the 1924 United States presidential election.

Walsh would later go on to win a special Senate election in 1926 to the Class I seat, and he served until his final defeat in 1946.

== Democratic primary ==
=== Candidates ===
- David I. Walsh, incumbent Senator

=== Results ===
Senator Walsh was unopposed for renomination.

1924 Democratic U.S. Senate primary
Party	Candidate	Votes	%
Democratic	David I. Walsh (incumbent)	120,915	99.99
Write-in		8	0.01
Total votes		120,923	100.00

== Republican primary ==
=== Candidates ===
- Louis A. Coolidge, former Assistant U.S. Treasury Secretary, founding president of Sentinels of the Republic, and former private secretary to Senator Henry Cabot Lodge
- Frederick W. Dallinger, U.S. Representative from Cambridge
- Frederick H. Gillett, Speaker of the United States House of Representatives

==== Declined ====
- Channing Cox, Governor of Massachusetts
- Benjamin Loring Young, Speaker of the Massachusetts House of Representatives

=== Campaign ===
The early campaign was dominated by President Calvin Coolidge's efforts to recruit a candidate aligned with his own re-election campaign. Louis A. Coolidge (no relation) was the first candidate to formally announce his campaign. He spent much of the early campaign criticizing the President and other national Republicans' efforts to "interfere" in the race. President Coolidge's primary recruit was Governor Channing Cox, who had served as lieutenant governor when President Coolidge was Governor of Massachusetts.

Governor Cox announced he was not a candidate in early May, and Speaker of the House Frederick H. Gillett immediately announced his campaign after consulting with President Coolidge's advisor Frank Stearns. At the same time, U.S. Representative Frederick W. Dallinger made his informal campaign formal.

One of the dividing issues in the campaign was Prohibition. Louis Coolidge announced his outright opposition to the Eighteenth Amendment. Dallinger explicitly supported Prohibition. Gillett, who had voted against the Amendment but in favor of the Volstead Act to enforce its provisions, was considered a moderate.

=== Results ===
1924 Republican U.S. Senate primary
Party	Candidate	Votes	%
Republican	Frederick H. Gillett	145,879	45.33%
Republican	Louis A. Coolidge	93,680	29.11%
Republican	Frederick W. Dallinger	82,251	25.56%
Write-in		16	0.01%
Total votes		321,826	100.00

== General election ==
=== Candidates ===
- Frederick H. Gillett, Speaker of the United States House of Representatives (Republican)
- Antoinette F. Konikow, physician and feminist activist (Workers')
- David I. Walsh, incumbent senator since 1919 (Democratic)

=== Results ===
1924 U.S. Senate election in Massachusetts
Party	Candidate	Votes	%	±%
Republican	Frederick H. Gillett	566,188	50.26%	▲5.20
Democratic	David I. Walsh (incumbent)	547,600	48.61%	▼2.05
Workers	Antoinette F. Konikow	12,716	1.13%	N/A
Total votes		1,126,504	100.00%	
