= Robert M. Washburn =

American politician and writer

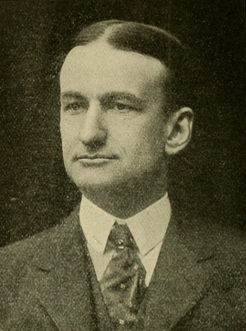
- Washburn c. 1915

Member of the Massachusetts Senate for the 1st Worcester District
- In office 1916–1916
- Preceded by: Fred W. Cross
- Succeeded by: James L. Harrop

Member of the Massachusetts House of Representatives for the 22nd Worcester District
- In office 1908–1915
- Preceded by: Elmer C. Potter
- Succeeded by: Daniel Waldo Lincoln II

Personal details
- Born: January 4, 1868 Worcester, Massachusetts, U.S.
- Died: February 26, 1946 (aged 78) Boston, Massachusetts, U.S.
- Resting place: Rural Cemetery; Worcester, Massachusetts
- Party: Republican
- Education: Harvard College
- Occupation: Lawyer; Author

Robert Morris Washburn (1868–1946) was an American politician and writer who served in the Massachusetts General Court and wrote a newspaper column and a number of biographies on Massachusetts politicians, including Calvin Coolidge.

== Early life ==
Washburn was born on January 4, 1868, in Worcester, Massachusetts, to Charles F. and Mary E. (Whiton) Washburn. He was one of seven children. His older brother, Charles G. Washburn, was a member of the United States House of Representatives. Another brother, Reginald, was chairman of the Worcester Liquor Commission. He graduated from Harvard College in 1890 and attended Harvard Law School. He studied law in Worcester offices and was admitted to the bar in 1892. Washburn owned the Princeton Bantam Yards, a poultry farm in Princeton, Massachusetts, where he bred prize-winning Red Pyle Game Bantam hens.

== Political career ==
=== State legislature ===
In 1907, Washburn was elected to the Massachusetts House of Representatives. He was described as an "insurgent" and had no problem opposing the state Republican machine. He served as chairman of the committee on railroad and was a vocal opponent of the proposed merger of the Boston & Maine and New York, New Haven, & Hartford railroads. In 1912 he was a candidate for Speaker of the House, but lost to Grafton D. Cushing. In 1915, Washburn was elected to the state senate. He resigned early into his only term in the Senate due to ill health. Following his departure from the legislature, Washburn went to Baltimore to recover. While there he met Martha Ross Clark and the two married in 1916.

=== Presidential campaigns ===
Washburn supported Theodore Roosevelt for the Republican presidential nomination in 1912 and 1916. In 1922 Washburn helped establish the Roosevelt Club of Massachusetts and served as its president for many years. Following Roosevelt's death, Washburn supported William Borah.

=== Statewide campaigns ===
In 1920, Washburn ran as an independent candidate for Lieutenant Governor of Massachusetts. He finished in third place with 14% of the vote to Republican Alvan T. Fuller's 54% and Democrat Marcus A. Coolidge's 29%.

In 1928, Washburn was a candidate for the United States Senate seat held by David I. Walsh. However he dropped out of the race on July 25 so that he could "take the stump" for fellow candidate Butler Ames. Ames lost the Republican nomination to Benjamin Loring Young. With no other Republicans challenging Walsh in 1934, Washburn entered the race. Walsh defeated Washburn 59% to 37%.

== Author ==
For many years, Washburn penned "Washburn's Weekly", a column in the Boston Transcript. He also wrote a number of biographies on political figures, including William M. Butler. In 1923 he published "Calvin Coolidge: His First Biography", a 150-page character sketch of President Calvin Coolidge.

== Death ==
Washburn died on February 26, 1946, at his home in Boston. He was buried in Worcester's Rural Cemetery.

== See also ==
- 1915 Massachusetts legislature
- 1916 Massachusetts legislature

Party political offices
Preceded by Benjamin Loring Young	Republican nominee for U.S. Senator from Massachusetts (Class 1); 1934	Succeeded by Henry Parkman Jr.
