= 1920 Massachusetts legislature =

141st Massachusetts General Court
←	140th	142nd	→

Overview
- Legislative body: General Court
- Election: November 4, 1919

Senate
- Members: 40
- President: Edwin T. McKnight (6th Middlesex)
- Party control: Republican

House
- Members: 240
- Speaker: Joseph E. Warner (4th Bristol)
- Party control: Republican

Sessions
- 1st: January 7, 1920 – June 5, 1920 + 16-day extra session

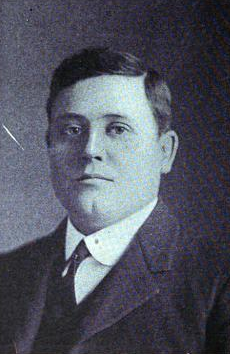
Edwin McKnight, Senate president.

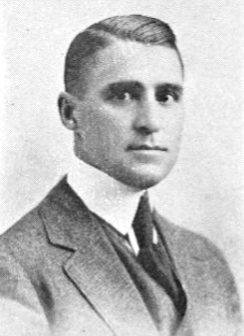
Joseph Warner, House speaker.

Leaders of the Massachusetts General Court, 1920.

The 141st Massachusetts General Court, consisting of the Massachusetts Senate and the Massachusetts House of Representatives, met in 1920 during the governorship of Calvin Coolidge. Edwin T. McKnight served as president of the Senate and Joseph E. Warner served as speaker of the House.

== Senators ==
portrait	name	date of birth	district
	Frank G. Allen	October 6, 1874	
	Alvin E. Bliss		4th Middlesex
	Frederick Butler		
	George H. Carrick		
	Andrew A. Casassa		
	George Dudley Chamberlain		
	John W. Churchill	November 17, 1853	
	Harry A. Cooke		
	George E. Curran		
	John A. Curtin	April 3, 1870	
	Edward N. Dahlborg		
	Thomas F. Donovan	September 26, 1890	
	Carl C. Emery	November 4, 1888	
	Samuel B. Finkel		
	William J. Foley	March 2, 1887	
	John Mellen Gibbs		
	Lyman W. Griswold	October 16, 1869	
	John Halliwell	February 21, 1864	
	Leonard F. Hardy		
	Walter A. Hardy	December 15, 1866	
	Joseph O. Knox		
	Augustus Peabody Loring	1856	
	John J. Mahoney	April 13, 1860	
	Daniel Aloysius Martin		
	David Story McIntosh		
	Edwin T. McKnight	October 11, 1869	
	Walter E. McLane		
	William C. Moulton	October 15, 1873	
	Arthur L. Nason	October 24, 1872	
	Christian Nelson		
	Gardner W. Pearson		
	Francis Prescott		
	Frank H. Putnam		
	Martin Lewis Quinn	January 19, 1862	
	Silas D. Reed		
	Warren E. Tarbell		
	John J. Walsh		
	Wellington Wells	April 18, 1868	
	Thomas Weston, Jr		
	Charles A. Winchester		

== Representatives ==
portrait	name	date of birth	district
	Essex S. Abbott		
	Henry Achin Jr.	June 30, 1883	
	Talbot Aldrich		4th Norfolk
	Charles H. Annis	January 12, 1869	
	Seth Fenelon Arnold	December 21, 1878	
	Charles M. Austin	May 2, 1884	
	James T. Bagshaw		
	William B. Baldwin	September 18, 1854	
	Frank E. Barrows	June 14, 1871	
	George J. Bates	February 25, 1891	
	Russell T. Bates		
	Arthur Enoch Beane		
	Addison P. Beardsley		
	Erastus T. Bearse		
	Chauncey A. Bennett		
	James D. Bentley	February 6, 1884	
	Adelard Berard		
	Alfred M. Bessette	March 25, 1876	
	Orlando C. Bidwell		
	Robert E. Bigney		
	Edgar A. Bowers		
	Eden K. Bowser		
	Alfred Bradbury		
	Charles D. Bradbury		
	Louis Adelard Breault		
	Owen E. Brennen	September 26, 1868	
	Frank L. Brier		
	George E. Briggs	May 3, 1873	
	John C. Brimblecom	1868	
	E. Gerry Brown		
	Charles H. Brown	January 19, 1879	
	Samuel F. Brown	December 26, 1878	
	Edgar J. Buck		
	Maurice Allan Buck		
	Albert W. Bullock	April 18, 1872	
	William J. Bullock		
	Frank James Burke	September 8, 1885	
	Herbert W. Burr	June 15, 1866	
	William A. Canty		
	John J. Carey	February 28, 1888	
	Julius F. Carman	August 7, 1861	
	John B. Cashman		
	Mial W. Chase		
	Henry S. Clark		
	Everett W. Coleman		
	William J. Conlon	March 14, 1868	
	William S. Conroy	October 2, 1877	
	D. Herbert Cook	June 2, 1851	
	Richard B. Coolidge	September 14, 1879	
	Thomas J. Corbett	May 10, 1883	
	Frank N. Coulson		
	Frank H. Cowin		
	William F. Craig	September 15, 1866	
	Samuel V. Crane	October 4, 1855	
	Walter Thomas Creese		
	William Cyril Crossley		
	James E. Curry		
	Warren Chapman Daggett	May 10, 1868	
	Elbridge Gerry Davis	August 20, 1877	
	Henry Ellsworth Dean	September 29, 1862	
	James P. Donnelly	February 26, 1890	
	Robert W. Dow	July 15, 1868	
	Lawrence F. Dowd		
	Andrew P. Doyle	August 15, 1869	
	Cornelius J. Driscoll		
	Timothy J. Driscoll		
	Henry Francis Duggan		
	Bernard Earley		
	James Joseph Early		
	George R. Ellis	July 29, 1876	
	Vernon W. Evans	January 5, 1895	
	Erland F. Fish	December 7, 1883	
	John I. Fitzgerald	July 18, 1882	
	Michael J. Fitzgerald	March 1, 1891	
	William Fleming		
	Charles R. Foote	July 9, 1865	
	William J. Francis		
	John F. Freeland		
	Harvey E. Frost	October 2, 1875	
	Tony Garofano	May 28, 1885	
	Daniel J. Gillen		
	George A. Gilman	August 16, 1880	
	Frederick P. Glazier	September 27, 1859	
	Albert C. Goff		
	James A. Goode		
	Charles Waite Gould	May 8, 1891	
	William H. Grady		
	William Grant	January 4, 1855	
	Louis L. Green		
	Thomas H. Green	May 11, 1883	
	Herbert S. Grutchfield		
	Fred C. Haigis		
	Walter S. Hale		
	Cornelius F. Haley	July 15, 1875	
	Leo Spotten Hamburger		
	William H. Hannagan		
	Edward F. Harrington	August 10, 1878	
	Edward Joseph Harrington	1894	
	Charles H. Hartshorn		
	John Francis Harvey	January 30, 1891	
	Brad Dudley Harvey		
	Daniel J. Hayden		
	James William Hayes		
	Walter Haynes		
	Martin Hays	October 14, 1876	
	Joseph E. Herrick		
	William P. Hickey	November 17, 1871	
	Matthew A. Higgins		
	Edward Carroll Hinckley		
	Charles Sumner Holden	May 2, 1857	
	Edgar F. Howland		
	George C. F. Hudson		
	John C. Hull (politician)	November 1, 1870	
	James Melville Hunnewell		
	Victor Francis Jewett		
	Arthur Westgate Jones	January 11, 1873	
	Michael H. Jordan	February 7, 1863	
	Thomas Martin Joyce		
	Jeremiah P. Keating		
	Kenneth W. Keith		
	James H. Kelleher		
	James J. Kelley		
	Frank M. Kelley		
	Walter H. Kemp		
	Davis B. Keniston		
	Clarence P. Kidder		
	Joseph E. King		
	Frederic W. Kingman		
	Hugh J. Lacey		
	Wilfrid J. Lamoureux	December 13, 1869	
	Benjamin C. Lane		
	Ernest A. LaRocque		
	Joseph Lawrence Larson		
	James F. Leland		
	Wilbur F. Lewis		
	Willard P. Lombard		
	William J. Look	June 20, 1867	
	Frank E. Lyman	September 15, 1866	
	Lloyd Makepeace		
	Robert L. Manley		
	Frank A. Manning		
	William J. Manning		
	Arthur E. Marsh		
	Daniel J. Marshall		
	John C. Marshall	November 28, 1877	
	John Henry McAllister		
	John W. McCormack	December 21, 1891	
	Elmer L. McCulloch		
	Allan R. McDonald		
	William H. McDonnell	April 9, 1885	
	Francis B. McKinney		
	James J. Mellen	March 30, 1875	
	Walter L. Mellen	January 10, 1868	
	Patrick J. Melody		
	Samuel W. Mendum		
	Julius Meyers	December 6, 1854	
	Herbert L. Miller		
	John Mitchell	September 4, 1877	
	Wesley E. Monk	August 1, 1874	
	Patrick F. Moran		
	James Morrison	February 17, 1857	
	J. Warren Moulton		
	James J. Moynihan		
	George G. Moyse	December 21, 1878	
	James J. Mulvey		
	Daniel C. Murphy	December 14, 1887	
	Albert J. Murphy		
	George F. Murphy		
	William J. Naphen		
	John R. Nelson	November 22, 1871	
	George Henry Newhall		
	Frederic C. Nichols		
	Thomas A. Niland	June 11, 1873	
	Edwin Gates Norman		
	Daniel W. O'Connor	March 12, 1877	
	Frank A. Oberti		
	William W. Ollendorff		
	Louis Orenberg		
	John Glenn Orr	February 27, 1857	
	Henry F. Paige	January 30, 1853	
	Walter S. Parker		
	George Penshorn		
	Chauncey Pepin		
	Frank B. Phinney		
	William Plattner		
	George K. Pond		
	James Tracy Potter	January 26, 1870	
	Arthur K. Reading		
	Abbott B. Rice		
	George Louis Richards		
	Alfred P. Richards		
	James W. Robertson		
	Arthur W. Robinson		
	Carl J. Rolander		
	Morrill S. Ryder		
	Roland D. Sawyer	January 8, 1874	
	Edward A. Scigliano		
	Leo P. Senecal		
	Henry Lee Shattuck	October 12, 1879	
	Walter Shuebruk		
	Coleman Silbert		
	Charles Henry Slowey		
	Almond Smith		
	Jerome S. Smith		
	Dexter Avery Snow	January 3, 1890	
	William L. Stedman		
	Emil K. Steele		
	Walter F. Stephens		
	Elihu D. Stone		
	James F. Sweeney		
	Charles Symonds		
	Edward Willis Taylor		
	John Thomas	January 27, 1859	
	Prince H. Tirrell		
	James A. Torrey	September 27, 1868	
	Raymond H. Trefry		
	James B. Troy		
	Arthur H. Turner		
	Albert T. Wall		
	Joseph E. Warner	May 16, 1884	
	Charles C. Warren		
	Frederick A. Warren		
	George M. Webber		
	George Pearl Webster	January 9, 1877	
	Henry H. Wheelock		
	Renton Whidden		
	John Addison White	August 8, 1859	
	Howard B. White		
	Alfred H. Whitney		
	James H. Wilkins		
	Edward E. Willard	September 25, 1862	
	Herbert Wing		
	Herbert Francis Winn		
	Isaac U. Wood		
	William H. Woodhead	September 17, 1860	
	Harry C. Woodill		
	Benjamin H. Woodsum		
	George M. Worrall		
	Samuel H. Wragg	June 9, 1882	
	Elwin Temple Wright		
	Benjamin Loring Young	1885	

== See also ==
- 1920 Massachusetts gubernatorial election
- 66th United States Congress
- List of Massachusetts General Courts
