= Eben S. Draper Jr. =

American politician (1893–1959)

Eben S. Draper
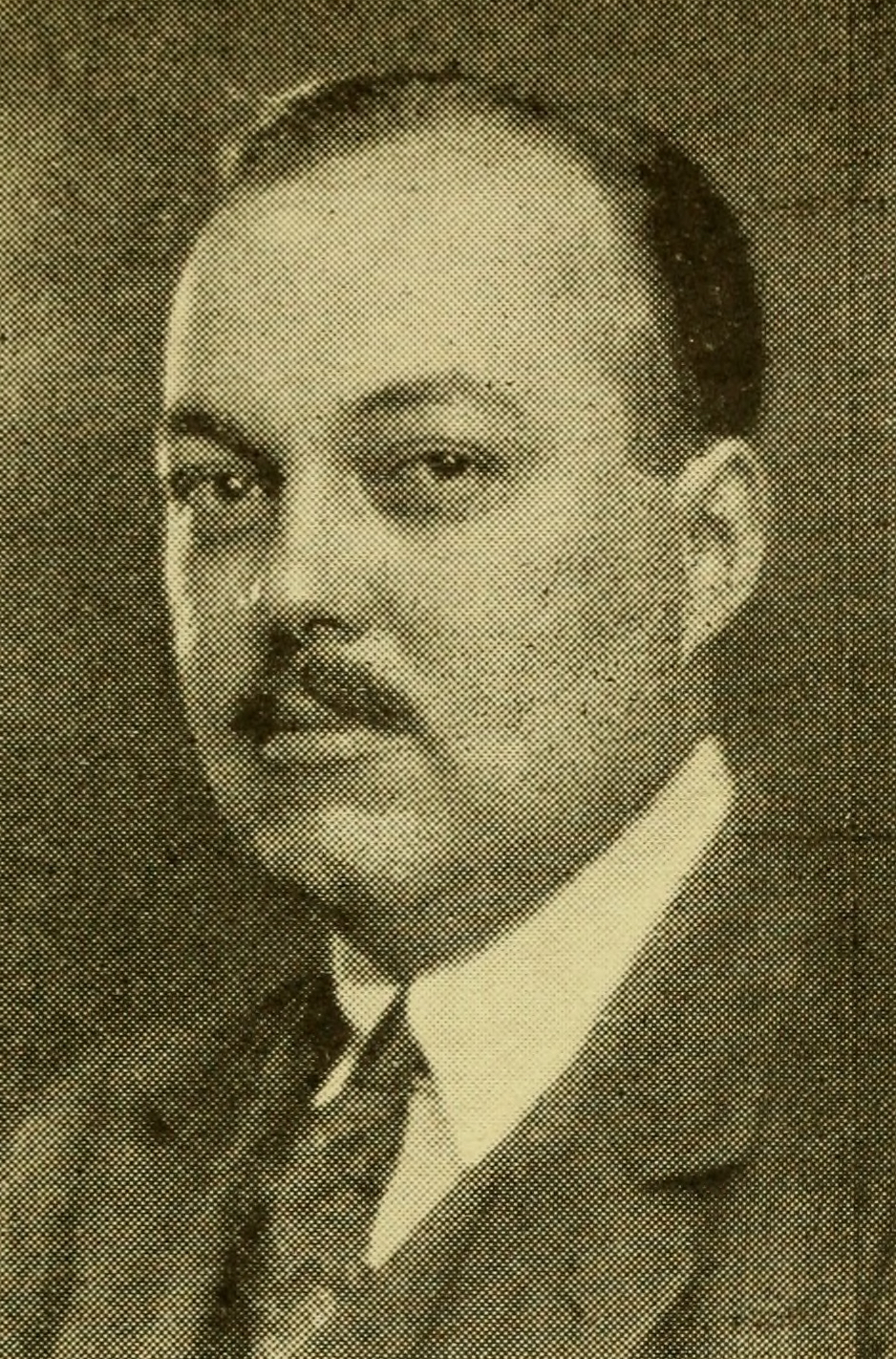
- Draper c. 1923

Member of the Massachusetts Senate from the 4th Worcester District
- In office 1923–1927
- Preceded by: Charles Waite Gould
- Succeeded by: Elbert M. Crockett

Member of the Massachusetts House of Representatives from the 8th Worcester District
- In office 1921–1923
- Preceded by: Samuel V. Crane
- Succeeded by: George J. Herbert

Personal details
- Born: August 30, 1893 Hopedale, Massachusetts
- Died: April 17, 1959 (aged 65) Boston
- Party: Republican
- Education: Harvard College

Eben Sumner Draper (August 30, 1893 – April 17, 1959) was an American businessman and politician who served in the Massachusetts General Court, was president of the Milford National Bank & Trust, and was the last member of his family to serve on the board of directors of the Draper Corporation. He was the son of Massachusetts Governor Eben Sumner Draper.

== Early life ==
Draper was born on August 30, 1893, in Hopedale, Massachusetts, to Eben S. Draper Sr. and Nannie Draper (nee Bristow). He graduated from Noble and Greenough School. In 1913, he was a member of the crew of the power schooner Polar Bear, which took part in a scientific expedition in the Arctic Circle. The Polar Bear froze in the ice near Flaxman Island (halfway between Herschel Island and Point Barrow). The crew disembarked and walked to Circle City. From there, they went to Fairbanks and then to Valdez, where they took a steamer to Seattle. In 1915 he graduated from Harvard College. After college, he spent two years as a mechanic at the Draper Corporation.

== World War I ==
During World War I, Draper was a captain in the American Expeditionary Forces. He entered first officer's training school in Plattsburgh, New York, in May 1917. He was commissioned as a 2nd lieutenant in the heavy artillery on August 15, 1917. He sailed to France on September 12, 1917. Upon arrival, Draper spent three months in a French artillery school. He then serve two months with the British artillery. He took part in the Second Battle of the Marne and the Meuse–Argonne offensive. In October 1918 he received his commission as a captain.

== Personal life ==
While serving in France, Draper met Red Cross worker Ruth Lawrence Carroll. The couple married on August 30, 1919, in Paul Smiths, New York. They resided at The Ledges, the former home of Draper's father, in Hopedale, Massachusetts. The couple had one daughter, Nancy, born on August 28, 1922. On July 24, 1926, Ruth Draper was granted a divorce in Paris on the ground of desertion. She was awarded custody of their daughter.

On November 12, 1926, Draper married Hazel Archibald in Rutherford, New Jersey. After their marriage, Draper tore down "The Ledges" and build a new mansion (also known as "The Ledges") for her. In October 1935, Hazel Draper suffered a mental breakdown following an operation. On April 18, she had left the Four Winds Sanitarium in Katonah, New York, where she had been staying for four months. She was last seen on April 20, 1936, boarding the Georgic. There were concerns that she may have committed suicide by jumping off of the ship, however on April 29, she was found stowed away in a tank room.

== Political career ==
Draper represented the 8th Worcester District in the Massachusetts House of Representatives in 1921 and 1922. He then represented the 4th Worcester District in the Massachusetts Senate from 1923 to 1927. In 1928 he sought the Republican nomination for the United States Senate seat held by Democrat David I. Walsh. He was supported by the Constitutional Liberty League, a "wet" organization that opposed prohibition. He lost the Republican primary to Benjamin Loring Young, receiving 36% of the vote to Young's 41% (Butler Ames received the remaining 23%). Draper ran for a U.S. Senate seat again in 1930. He lost the Republican primary to William M. Butler by 6,591 votes.

== Business career ==
From 1919 to 1934, Draper was a director of the Milford National Bank & Trust. On October 1, 1934, he was elected president of the bank. Draper also served as president of the Milford Hospital.

From 1935 to 1955, Draper was a director of the Draper Corporation. He was the last member of his family to serve on the company's board.

Draper died on April 17, 1959, at Massachusetts General Hospital, where he had been staying since undergoing a major surgery the previous month.

== See also ==
- 1921–1922 Massachusetts legislature
- 1923–1924 Massachusetts legislature
- 1925–1926 Massachusetts legislature
