= 1934 United States Senate election in Massachusetts =

- November 6, 1934
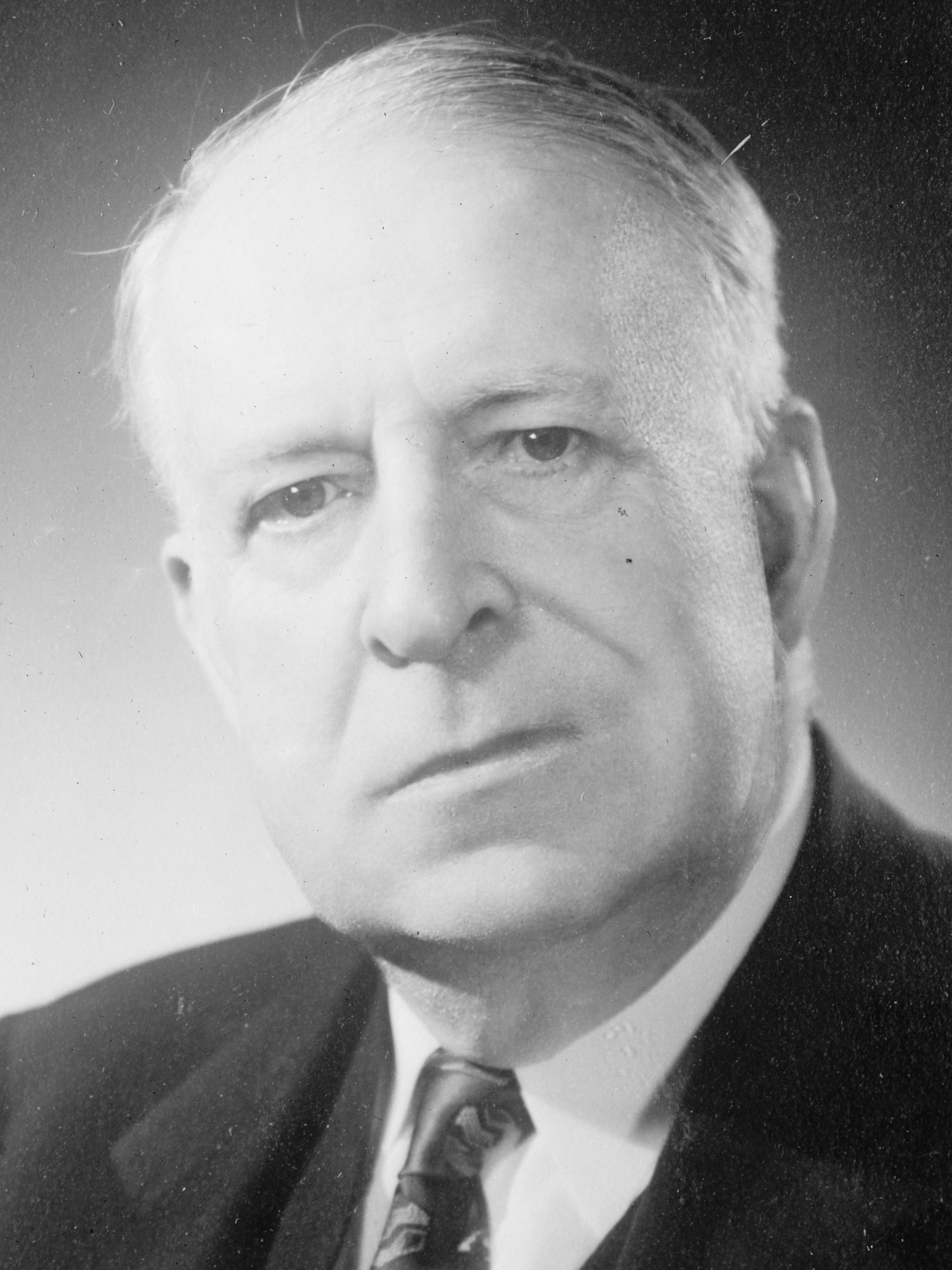

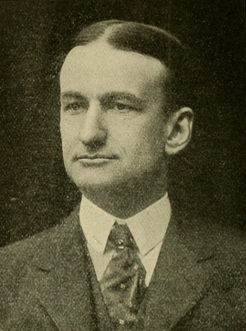
Nominee	David I. Walsh	Robert M. Washburn
Party	Democratic	Republican
Popular vote	852,776	536,692
Percentage	59.39%	37.38%
- Walsh: 40–50% 50–60% 60–70% 70–80% 80–90% Washburn: 40–50% 50–60% 60–70% 70–80% 80–90% 100%
Senator before election
David I. Walsh
Democratic
Elected Senator
David I. Walsh
Democratic

The 1934 United States Senate election in Massachusetts was held on November 6, 1934. Democratic incumbent David I. Walsh was re-elected to a second consecutive term, the first Democrat ever to do so in the state, in a landslide over Republican Robert M. Washburn.

== Democratic primary ==
=== Candidates ===
- Edward P. Barry, former Lieutenant Governor of Massachusetts (1914–15)
- William Donahoe, former State Representative from Boston
- David I. Walsh, incumbent Senator

==== Results ====
1934 Democratic U.S. Senate primary
Party	Candidate	Votes	%
Democratic	David I. Walsh (incumbent)	270,242	66.79%
Democratic	Edward P. Barry	102,863	25.42%
Democratic	William Donahoe	31,474	7.78%
Write-in		12	0.00%
Total votes		404,591	100.00%

== Republican primary ==
=== Candidates ===
- Robert M. Washburn, writer and candidate for Senate in 1928

==== Results ====
1934 Democratic U.S. Senate primary
Party	Candidate	Votes	%
Republican	Robert M. Washburn	295,849	99.99%
Write-in		20	0.01%
Total votes		295,869	100.00%

== General election ==
=== Candidates ===
- Albert Sprague Coolidge, candidate for Massachusetts Secretary of the Commonwealth in 1930 and 1932 (Socialist)
- Barnard Smith (Prohibition)
- David I. Walsh, incumbent Senator since 1926 (Democratic)
- Robert M. Washburn, writer and candidate for Senate in 1928 (Republican)
- Albert L. Waterman, candidate for Secretary of the Commonwealth in 1932 and Treasurer in 1920 (Socialist Labor)
- Paul C. Wicks, candidate for U.S. House in 1932 (Communist)

=== Results ===
1934 U.S. Senate election in Massachusetts
Party	Candidate	Votes	%	±%
Democratic	David I. Walsh (incumbent)	852,776	59.39%	▲5.83
Republican	Robert M. Washburn	536,692	37.38%	▼8.10
Socialist	Albert Sprague Coolidge	22,092	1.54%	▲1.04
Prohibition	Barnard Smith	10,363	0.72%	▲0.72
Socialist Labor	Albert L. Waterman	8,245	0.57%	▲0.57
Communist	Paul C. Wicks	5,757	0.40%	▲0.03
Total votes		1,435,925	100.00%	
