= John C. Hull (politician) =

American politician (1870–1947)

John Carpenter Hull
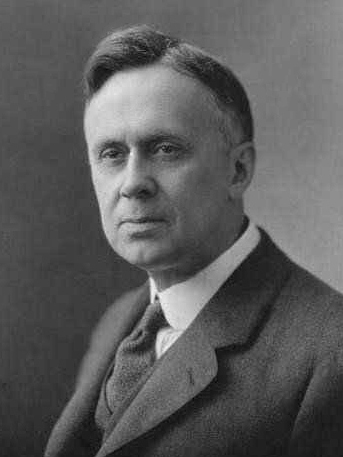

Speaker of the Massachusetts House of Representatives
- In office 1925–1928
- Preceded by: Benjamin Loring Young
- Succeeded by: Leverett Saltonstall

Member of the Massachusetts House of Representatives 11th Worcester House District
- In office 1916–1928

Member of the Leominster, Massachusetts School Committee
- In office 1912–1915

Moderator of Leominster, Massachusetts Town Meeting
- In office 1912–1915

Personal details
- Born: November 1, 1870 Deering, Maine, U.S.
- Died: January 7, 1947 (aged 76) Boston, Massachusetts, U.S.
- Party: Republican
- Spouse: Harriet Johnson
- Education: Bowdoin College; University of Michigan Law School; Harvard Law School
- Profession: Lawyer

John Carpenter Hull (November 1, 1870 – January 7, 1947) was a politician and lawyer in Massachusetts who served as the Speaker of the Massachusetts House of Representatives from 1925 to 1928.

== Biography ==
John Carpenter Hull was born on November 1, 1870, in Deering, Maine. He received a Bachelor of Arts degree from Bowdoin College in 1892, and worked in various positions as the principal of high schools between 1892 and 1911, including Fryeburg Academy, Leominster High School, and Milford High School. He attended the University of Michigan Law School in 1910 and Harvard Law School from 1910 until 1912, after which he began practicing law in Leominster, Massachusetts.

From 1912 to 1915, Hull served on the Leominster school board and was the moderator of the town meetings. In 1916, he won election to the Massachusetts House of Representatives' 11th Worcester district as a Republican and held the seat until 1928. He also served as the Speaker of the Massachusetts House of Representatives from 1925 to 1928. In 1928, he unsuccessfully sought the Republican nomination for Lieutenant Governor of Massachusetts before retiring from electoral politics. He was a member of the Massachusetts Board of Industrial Accidents until stepping down in 1929 to serve as the inaugural director of the Securities Division of the Massachusetts Department of Public Utilities.

Hull died on January 7, 1947, at the Massachusetts Eye, Ear, Nose and Throat Infirmary in Boston.

== See also ==
- 1915 Massachusetts legislature
- 1917 Massachusetts legislature
- 1918 Massachusetts legislature
- 1919 Massachusetts legislature
- 1920 Massachusetts legislature
- 1921–1922 Massachusetts legislature
- 1923–1924 Massachusetts legislature
- 1925–1926 Massachusetts legislature
- 1927–1928 Massachusetts legislature

Massachusetts House of Representatives
Preceded by Benjamin Loring Young	Speaker of the Massachusetts House of Representatives; 1925–1928	Succeeded by Leverett Saltonstall
