= Elijah Adlow =

American politician (1896–1982)

Chief Justice Boston Municipal Court Department
- In office April 22, 1954 – January 4, 1973
- Appointed by: Christian Herter
- Preceded by: Davis B. Keniston
- Succeeded by: Jacob Lewiton

Personal details
- Born: August 15, 1896 Boston, Massachusetts, U.S.
- Died: November 4, 1982 (aged 86) Boston, Massachusetts, U.S.
- Spouse: Jessie (Sugerman) Adlow
- Education: Harvard Law School

Elijah Adlow (August 15, 1896 – November 4, 1982) was an American lawyer, politician, jurist, author and the Chief Justice of the Municipal Court of the City of Boston, now known as the Boston Municipal Court Department, serving in that capacity from 1954 to 1973. Prior to that he was a Special Justice and Associate Justice of the court, starting in 1928.

== Early life and education ==
Adlow was born in the West End of Boston, Massachusetts to Jewish immigrant parents. His father, Nathan Adlow, emigrated as a youth from Kazarez, Poland, His mother, Bessie (Bravman) Adlow, was born in Dauge, Lithuania. The family moved from the West End to East Boston, and afterwards settled in the Roxbury neighborhood of Boston a year after Nathan opened a furniture store there.^{[G]}

Due to changes in rules and policies made both by Adlow's elementary school and the Boston Public Schools, he completed grammar school in 1908 at age 11.^{[G]} He entered English High School the following school year, graduating in 1912 at 16 years old. Later that year, Adlow attended Harvard University, which he went through in three years, graduating cum laude in 1915. Two years later, he was graduated from Harvard Law School, and after passing his bar exam, he served in the Navy until the end of World War I.^{[G]}

== Career ==
A Republican, Adlow was a member of the Massachusetts House of Representatives from the 16th Suffolk District from 1921 through 1926, in addition to his private law practice. From 1927 until he was appointed a judge in 1928, he served as special counsel for the City of Boston.^{[G]}

He was a member of the National Guard from 1924 until 1954, when he retired with the rank of brigadier general. From 1930 to 1942, he was judge advocate of the 26th Yankee Division and entered federal service with the division in 1941. After World War II, he was a member of the adjutant general's staff.^{[G]}

Adlow's judicial career began in October 1928 when he was appointed Special Justice of the Municipal Court by Governor Alvan T. Fuller. His position with the court was made permanent one year later when Governor Frank G. Allen named him associate justice. When Chief Justice Davis B. Keniston died in 1954, Governor Christian Herter appointed Adlow to replace him as Chief Justice on April 22, 1954. In his role as Chief Justice, he presided over 8 Associate Justices and 5 Special Justices in the busiest court in New England and one of the 10 busiest courts in the United States. After a mandatory retirement age of 70 for judges was passed by the voters, Adlow was forced to retire at the age of 76 in January 1973.

== Works ==
- Policeman and People (1947)
- Napoleon in Italy, 1796-1797 (1948)
- The Genius of Lemuel Shaw: Expounder of the Common Law (1962)
- Threshold of Justice: A Judge's Life Story (1973)

== Personal ==
Adlow was married for 55 years to Jessie (Sugerman) Adlow (1901 - 1996) and had two daughters. His sister Dorothy Adlow was nationally known art critic for The Christian Science Monitor.

He died at New England Deaconess Hospital after an illness on November 4, 1982, aged 86.

== See also ==
- 1921–1922 Massachusetts legislature
- 1923–1924 Massachusetts legislature
- 1925–1926 Massachusetts legislature
