= John C. Brimblecom =

American politician (1868–1933)

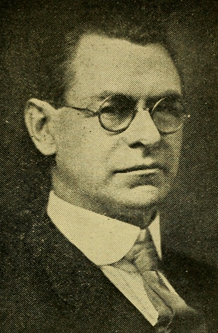

Member of the Massachusetts House of Representatives
- In office 1920–1924

Personal details
- Born: January 21, 1868 Swampscott, Massachusetts, U.S.
- Died: December 10, 1933 (aged 65) Newtonville, Massachusetts, U.S.
- Party: Republican

John C. Brimblecom (January 21, 1868 – December 10, 1933) was a state legislator in Massachusetts. He studied at the schools in Newton and worked as an editor. He held city offices and served in the state house from 1920 to 1924. He was a Republican.

He was born in Swampscott. He represented the Fourth Middlesex District. He authored Beautiful Newton.

== See also ==
- 1920 Massachusetts legislature
- 1921–1922 Massachusetts legislature
- 1923–1924 Massachusetts legislature
