= 1923–1924 Massachusetts legislature =

143rd Massachusetts General Court
←	142nd	144th	→

Overview
- Legislative body: General Court
- Election: November 7, 1922

Senate
- Members: 40
- President: Frank G. Allen (Norfolk district)
- Party control: Republican

House
- Members: 240
- Speaker: Benjamin Loring Young (13th Middlesex)
- Party control: Republican

Sessions
- 1st: January 3, 1923 – May 26, 1923
- 2nd: January 2, 1924 – June 5, 1924

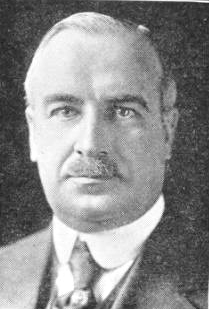
Frank Allen, Senate president.

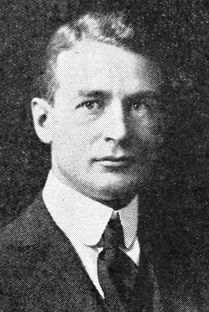
Benjamin Loring Young, House speaker.

Leaders of the Massachusetts General Court, 1923.

The 143rd Massachusetts General Court, consisting of the Massachusetts Senate and the Massachusetts House of Representatives, met in 1923 and 1924 during the governorship of Channing H. Cox. Frank G. Allen served as president of the Senate and Benjamin Loring Young served as speaker of the House.

== Senators ==
portrait	name	date of birth	district
	Frank G. Allen	October 6, 1874	
	Charles M. Austin	May 2, 1884	
	George W. P. Babb		8th Suffolk
	Alvin E. Bliss		
	George H. Carrick		
	George Dudley Chamberlain		
	Henry S. Clark		
	Edward J. Cox		
	Walter Thomas Creese		
	Eben S. Draper Jr.	August 30, 1893	
	William J. Francis		
	Charles Benjamin Frothingham	November 11, 1858	
	Richard A. Gibbons		
	John Mellen Gibbs		
	John W. Haigis	July 31, 1881	
	John Halliwell	February 21, 1864	
	Charles H. Hartshorn		
	William Ignatius Hennessey		
	Charles P. Howard		
	William J. Look	June 20, 1867	
	John W. McCormack	December 21, 1891	
	Walter E. McLane		
	Patrick J. Melody		
	James G. Moran	May 2, 1870	
	James J. Mulvey		
	Christian Nelson		
	William A. O'Hearn	March 8, 1887	
	Frank H. Putnam		
	Albert Taylor Rhodes		
	Abbott B. Rice		
	John Francis Shea	August 21, 1882	
	Walter Shuebruk		
	Dexter Avery Snow	January 3, 1890	
	John A. Stoddart	May 10, 1869	
	Warren E. Tarbell		
	Albert P. Wadleigh		
	Charles C. Warren		
	George M. Webber		
	Wellington Wells	April 18, 1868	

== Representatives ==
portrait	name	date of birth	district
	Charles E. Abbott	February 22, 1856	9th Essex
	Henry Achin Jr.	June 30, 1883	
	Elijah Adlow	August 15, 1896	
	Walter Dickey Allen	March 15, 1896	
	Charles W. Ames	March 10, 1860	
	Charles H. Annis	January 12, 1869	
	Charles H. Ashley	February 13, 1860	
	Harrison Henry Atwood	August 26, 1863	
	Frank E. Barrows	June 14, 1871	
	Thomas R. Bateman	October 11, 1878	
	George J. Bates	February 25, 1891	
	John E. Beck	May 10, 1869	
	William J. Bell	December 7, 1884	
	James D. Bentley	February 6, 1884	
	Alfred M. Bessette	March 25, 1876	
	Thomas H. Bilodeau	February 3, 1885	
	Arthur Franklin Blanchard	January 27, 1883	
	Owen E. Brennen	September 26, 1868	
	George E. Briggs	May 3, 1873	
	John C. Brimblecom	1868	
	George Francis Brooks	August 23, 1856	
	James B. Brown	March 3, 1885	
	Albert W. Bullock	April 18, 1872	
	Ralph Howard Burckes		
	Hugh Joseph Campbell	September 28, 1896	
	William A. Canty		
	Edward J. Carey	January 29, 1884	
	Julius F. Carman	August 7, 1861	
	William Casey	November 20, 1884	
	James Bernard Casey	June 19, 1897	
	Francis E. Cassidy	February 14, 1888	
	Francis Peter Clark	August 22, 1896	
	Ezra W. Clark	October 12, 1842	
	Maynard Clemons	December 11, 1866	
	William J. Conlon	March 14, 1868	
	William S. Conroy	October 2, 1877	
	D. Herbert Cook	June 2, 1851	
	Fred Robbins Cooksey	April 14, 1893	
	Thomas J. Corbett	May 10, 1883	
	Joseph R. Cotton	November 16, 1890	
	Francis X. Coyne	March 15, 1892	
	Elbert M. Crockett	August 14, 1871	
	Richard D. Crockwell	October 23, 1886	
	Thomas Charles Crowther	April 28, 1892	
	P. Sarsfield Cunniff	September 12, 1874	
	Bert S. Currier	August 2, 1864	
	J. Frederick Curtin	November 30, 1892	
	Joseph D. Curtis	November 2, 1868	
	Warren Chapman Daggett	May 10, 1868	
	David D. Daley	March 23, 1872	
	Herbert King Davidson	October 19, 1882	
	J. Bradford Davis	September 26, 1889	
	Elbridge Gerry Davis	August 20, 1877	
	Elmer E. Dawson	October 11, 1861	
	Ernest J. Dean	April 5, 1883	
	Hiram Nichols Dearborn	December 21, 1867	
	Louis N. M. DesChenes	April 7, 1872	
	Burt Dewar	December 29, 1884	
	Robert Dinsmore	December 22, 1897	
	Timothy D. Donahue	November 3, 1869	
	Sylvia Donaldson	July 12, 1849	
	John F. Donovan	April 26, 1897	
	Timothy Francis Donovan	August 21, 1889	
	Walter Franklyn Douglas	August 22, 1869	
	Robert W. Dow	July 15, 1868	
	Andrew P. Doyle	August 15, 1869	
	John H. Drew	August 23, 1890	
	William L. DuBois	July 31, 1892	
	Edward Nelson Eames	October 19, 1858	
	Bernard Early		
	Frank W. Eaton	February 22, 1871	
	Vernon W. Evans	January 5, 1895	
	Gustave William Everberg	June 24, 1890	
	John T. Farrell	January 30, 1893	
	Bernard Finkelstein	July 4, 1887	
	Erland F. Fish	December 7, 1883	
	William Arthur Fish	July 4, 1885	
	Susan Walker Fitzgerald	May 9, 1871	
	John I. Fitzgerald	July 18, 1882	
	Maurice E. Foley	February 8, 1893	
	George F. Foley	November 6, 1896	
	Tony Garofano	May 28, 1885	
	Hugh H. Garrity	May 4, 1883	
	Richard J. Garvey	July 19, 1892	
	Herbert J. George	May 16, 1868	
	George A. Gilman	August 16, 1880	
	Charles H. Gilmore	February 27, 1878	
	Frederick P. Glazier	September 27, 1859	
	Richard D. Gleason	September 22, 1896	
	Harold R. Goewey	October 12, 1893	
	Andrew J. Gorey	January 13, 1898	
	Patrick E. Granfield	March 17, 1894	
	Walter Bernard Grant	February 11, 1885	
	Merle Dixon Graves	October 13, 1887	
	Maurice F. Greaney		
	Louis L. Green		
	Eugene B. Griffin		
	Frank W. Guillo		
	C. Wesley Hale	February 13, 1872	
	Albert Harrison Hall		
	Leo J. Halloran		
	William H. Hannagan		
	Edward F. Harrington (state representative)	August 10, 1878	
	John A. Hawson		
	James William Hayes		
	Martin Hays	October 14, 1876	
	Jeremiah Joseph Healy	July 2, 1872	
	John J. Heffernan	January 27, 1893	
	William P. Hickey	November 17, 1871	
	Matthew A. Higgins		
	Charles R. Hillberg		
	Edward Carroll Hinckley		
	Charles Sumner Holden		
	Robert H. J. Holden		
	Elisha Hooper		
	Michael F. Hourihan		
	Harold E. Howard		
	Edgar F. Howland		
	John C. Hull (politician)	November 1, 1870	
	James Melville Hunnewell		
	Albert E. Hutt		
	Alfred Wesley Ingalls		
	George Frederick James		
	Victor Francis Jewett		
	Thomas H. Johnston	March 5, 1872	
	John Alfred Jones		
	Arthur Westgate Jones	January 11, 1873	
	Michael H. Jordan	February 7, 1863	
	Thomas Martin Joyce		
	Frederick E. Judd		
	Roland M. Keith	March 16, 1847	
	James H. Kelleher		
	John Augustine Kelleher	May 15, 1891	
	Charles A. Kelley	March 24, 1862	
	Edward J. Kelley	December 25, 1897	
	Peter L. Kelley		
	Coleman E. Kelly		
	Joseph Francis Kelly		
	Davis B. Keniston		
	Harry P. Kent		
	Clarence P. Kidder		
	Howard F. King		
	John Fenderson Kyes		
	William D. Lancaster		
	Joseph A. Langone Sr.	August 10, 1866	
	Ernest A. LaRocque		
	Joseph Lawrence Larson		
	Allen Lawson		
	Fred Oliver Lewis	June 12, 1878	
	Wilbur F. Lewis		
	Jeremiah M. Linnehan		
	John Tilton Litch		
	Arthur E. Littlefield		
	John H. Logue		
	Robert L. Manley		
	William Henry McCarthy		
	John J. McCarthy		
	Richard J. McCormick	August 11, 1888	
	Elmer L. McCulloch		
	Carroll Meins	October 22, 1892	
	James J. Mellen	March 30, 1875	
	John L. Mitchell		
	John Mitchell	September 4, 1877	
	Edward Brastow Moor		
	Thomas J. Morton	March 2, 1856	
	George G. Moyse	December 21, 1878	
	Daniel C. Murphy	December 14, 1887	
	George Henry Newhall		
	Thomas H. Nickerson		
	Edward H. Nutting	July 6, 1869	
	John J. O'Brien	October 18, 1879	
	Daniel W. O'Connor	March 12, 1877	
	James H. O'Dea		
	Olof F. Ohlson		
	Henry F. Paige	January 30, 1853	
	Herman Pehrsson		
	George Peirce		
	George Penshorn		
	Chauncey Pepin		
	Lewis Hilton Peters		
	Frank B. Phinney		
	Chester Arthur Pike		
	George K. Pond		
	Everett R. Prout		
	George Louis Richards		
	Joseph N. Roach	March 22, 1883	
	Everett William Robinson		
	Morrill S. Ryder		
	Leverett Saltonstall	September 1, 1892	
	Edward Julius Sandberg	October 21, 1866	
	Roland D. Sawyer	January 8, 1874	
	Frank O. Scott		
	Leo P. Senecal		
	Henry Lee Shattuck	October 12, 1879	
	Michael F. Shaw	September 12, 1865	
	Charles H. Shaylor		
	John P. Shepard		
	George S. Sinnicks		
	Charles Henry Slowey		
	Francis W. K. Smith		
	Almond Smith		
	Fred L. Snow		
	Walter Herbert Snow		
	Frederick Dexter Sowle		
	Ernest H. Sparrell		
	Lemuel W. Standish		
	William E. Staples		
	James D. Stewart		
	Ralph Raymond Stratton		
	Albert Austin Sutherland		
	James F. Sweeney		
	Charles Symonds		
	Valmore P. Tetreault		
	John E. Thayer Jr.		
	William Franklin Thomas Jr.		
	John Thomas	January 27, 1859	
	Harlie E. Thompson		
	Elwin L. Thompson		
	Prince H. Tirrell		
	Joseph D. Toomey		
	James A. Torrey	September 27, 1868	
	George M. Underwood		
	Edward F. Wallace		
	Richard McClennan Walsh	February 5, 1878	
	Robert Burns Walsh		
	James E. Warren		
	Frederick A. Warren		
	Slater Washburn		
	George Pearl Webster	January 9, 1877	
	James T. Welch		
	Henry H. Wheelock		
	Renton Whidden		
	Benjamin Franklin White Jr.		
	Herbert Francis Winn		
	William Henry Winnett		
	Temple A. Winsloe		
	Thomas A. Winston		
	Samuel H. Wragg	June 9, 1882	
	Benjamin Loring Young	1885	

== See also ==
- 1924 Massachusetts gubernatorial election
- 68th United States Congress
- List of Massachusetts General Courts
