= 1921–1922 Massachusetts legislature =

142nd Massachusetts General Court
←	141st	143rd	→

Overview
- Legislative body: General Court

Senate
- Members: 40

House
- Members: 240

The 142nd Massachusetts General Court, consisting of the Massachusetts Senate and the Massachusetts House of Representatives, met in 1921 and 1922.

== Senators ==
portrait	name	date of birth	district
	Frank G. Allen	October 6, 1874	
	Charles M. Austin	May 2, 1884	
	George W. P. Babb		8th Suffolk
	Alvin E. Bliss		
	Frederick Butler		
	John J. Carey	February 28, 1888	
	George H. Carrick		
	Andrew A. Casassa		
	George Dudley Chamberlain		
	John W. Churchill	November 17, 1853	
	Henry S. Clark		
	Harry A. Cooke		
	Edward N. Dahlborg		
	Thomas F. Donovan	September 26, 1890	
	Carl C. Emery	November 4, 1888	
	John P. Englert		
	John Mellen Gibbs		
	Charles Waite Gould	May 8, 1891	
	Thomas H. Green	May 11, 1883	
	Lyman W. Griswold	October 16, 1869	
	John Halliwell	February 21, 1864	
	Leonard F. Hardy		
	Walter A. Hardy	December 15, 1866	
	William H. McDonnell	April 9, 1885	
	Walter E. McLane		
	Wesley E. Monk	August 1, 1874	
	William C. Moulton	October 15, 1873	
	William J. Naphen		
	Christian Nelson		
	Lewis Parkhurst	1856	
	Gardner W. Pearson		
	Frank H. Putnam		
	Martin Lewis Quinn	January 19, 1862	
	Silas D. Reed		
	John Francis Shea	August 21, 1882	
	Warren E. Tarbell		
	Raymond H. Trefry		
	Albert P. Wadleigh		
	Wellington Wells	April 18, 1868	
	Elwin Temple Wright		

== Representatives ==
portrait	name	date of birth	district
	Essex S. Abbott		
	Charles E. Abbott	February 22, 1856	
	Henry Achin Jr.	June 30, 1883	
	Elijah Adlow	August 15, 1896	
	Talbot Aldrich		4th Norfolk
	Charles H. Annis	January 12, 1869	
	Frank S. Atwood		
	James T. Bagshaw		
	Frank H. Baldwin		
	Frank E. Barrows	June 14, 1871	
	Herbert Amiel Bartlett		
	Russell T. Bates		
	George J. Bates	February 25, 1891	
	Arthur Enoch Beane		
	William J. Bell	December 7, 1884	
	Edward Dana Bennett	April 6, 1871	
	James D. Bentley	February 6, 1884	
	Adelard Berard		
	Alfred M. Bessette	March 25, 1876	
	Orlando C. Bidwell		
	Osgood C. Blaney		
	Edgar A. Bowers		
	Omer E. Bradway		
	Owen E. Brennen	September 26, 1868	
	Frank L. Brier		
	George L. Briggs	December 5, 1877	
	John C. Brimblecom	1868	
	George Francis Brooks	August 23, 1856	
	James B. Brown	March 3, 1885	
	Samuel F. Brown	December 26, 1878	
	George J. Brunell	November 1, 1865	
	Albert W. Bullock	April 18, 1872	
	Frank James Burke	September 8, 1885	
	Herbert W. Burr	June 15, 1866	
	Hugh Joseph Campbell	September 28, 1896	
	Thomas I. Carleton		
	Julius F. Carman	August 7, 1861	
	Daniel W. Casey		
	John B. Cashman		
	Mial W. Chase		
	Ezra W. Clark	October 12, 1842	
	Thomas D. Collins		
	William J. Conlon	March 14, 1868	
	William S. Conroy	October 2, 1877	
	D. Herbert Cook	June 2, 1851	
	Fred Robbins Cooksey	April 14, 1893	
	Richard B. Coolidge	September 14, 1879	
	Thomas J. Corbett	May 10, 1883	
	Cornelius W. Corbett		
	George Costanza		
	Frank N. Coulson		
	Edward J. Cox		
	Francis X. Coyne	March 15, 1892	
	Walter Thomas Creese		
	Elbert M. Crockett	August 14, 1871	
	Richard D. Crockwell	October 23, 1886	
	William Cyril Crossley		
	Warren Chapman Daggett	May 10, 1868	
	George H. Dale	November 25, 1870	
	David D. Daley	March 23, 1872	
	Alonzo B. Davidson		
	J. Bradford Davis	September 26, 1889	
	Elbridge Gerry Davis	August 20, 1877	
	Elmer E. Dawson	October 11, 1861	
	Louis N. M. DesChenes	April 7, 1872	
	Walter Franklyn Douglas	August 22, 1869	
	Robert W. Dow	July 15, 1868	
	Lawrence F. Dowd		
	Andrew P. Doyle	August 15, 1869	
	Eben S. Draper Jr.	August 30, 1893	
	John H. Drew	August 23, 1890	
	Cornelius J. Driscoll		
	Timothy J. Driscoll		
	Bernard Early		
	Frank W. Eaton	February 22, 1871	
	Vernon W. Evans	January 5, 1895	
	John H. Faulk		
	Bernard Finkelstein	July 4, 1887	
	Erland F. Fish	December 7, 1883	
	Michael J. Fitzgerald	March 1, 1891	
	Charles R. Foote	July 9, 1865	
	William J. Francis		
	Harvey E. Frost	October 2, 1875	
	Charles Benjamin Frothingham	November 11, 1858	
	Félix Gatineau	November 12, 1857	
	Jacob F. Geb		
	George A. Gilman	August 16, 1880	
	Frederick P. Glazier	September 27, 1859	
	Albert C. Goff		
	James A. Goode		
	William H. Grady		
	William Grant	January 4, 1855	
	Merle Dixon Graves	October 13, 1887	
	Louis L. Green		
	Fred C. Haigis		
	Walter S. Hale		
	C. Wesley Hale	February 13, 1872	
	Leo Spotten Hamburger		
	William H. Hannagan		
	Edward F. Harrington (state representative)	August 10, 1878	
	Alfred William Hartford		
	Charles H. Hartshorn		
	John Francis Harvey	January 30, 1891	
	Brad Dudley Harvey		
	Charles F. Hawthorne		
	Martin Hays	October 14, 1876	
	Jeremiah Joseph Healy	July 2, 1872	
	William H. Hearn		
	John J. Heffernan	January 27, 1893	
	John Francis Heffernan		
	Richard H. Hefler		
	William Ignatius Hennessey		
	Joseph E. Herrick		
	William P. Hickey	November 17, 1871	
	Matthew A. Higgins		
	Charles R. Hillberg		
	Edward Carroll Hinckley		
	Paul H. Hines		
	Charles Sumner Holden	May 2, 1857	
	Charles F. Holman		
	Edgar F. Howland		
	George C. F. Hudson		
	John C. Hull (politician)	November 1, 1870	
	Charles G. Hull		
	James Melville Hunnewell		
	Fred A. Hutchinson	April 5, 1881	
	Victor Francis Jewett		
	Arthur Westgate Jones	January 11, 1873	
	Michael H. Jordan	February 7, 1863	
	Loring P. Jordan		
	Thomas Martin Joyce		
	James H. Kelleher		
	Frank M. Kelley		
	Charles A. Kelley	March 24, 1862	
	Coleman E. Kelly		
	Walter H. Kemp		
	Davis B. Keniston		
	Albert L. Kerr		
	Clarence P. Kidder		
	Frederic W. Kingman		
	William Prescott Kingsbury		
	Hugh J. Lacey		
	William D. Lancaster		
	Benjamin C. Lane		
	Ernest A. LaRocque		
	Joseph Lawrence Larson		
	Allen Lawson		
	Wilbur F. Lewis		
	Arthur E. Littlefield		
	John B. Locke		
	Martin Lomasney	December 3, 1859	
	William J. Look	June 20, 1867	
	Frank E. Lyman	September 15, 1866	
	Lloyd Makepeace		
	Robert L. Manley		
	John C. Marshall	November 28, 1877	
	John W. McCormack	December 21, 1891	
	Elmer L. McCulloch		
	Allan R. McDonald		
	James E. McVann		
	Stephen R. Mealey		
	James J. Mellen	March 30, 1875	
	Walter L. Mellen	January 10, 1868	
	Patrick J. Melody		
	Samuel W. Mendum		
	Julius Meyers	December 6, 1854	
	Herbert L. Miller		
	John Mitchell	September 4, 1877	
	Thomas J. Morton	March 2, 1856	
	George G. Moyse	December 21, 1878	
	James J. Mulvey		
	John R. Nelson	November 22, 1871	
	George H. Newhall	October 24, 1850	
	Edwin Gates Norman		
	John Glenn Orr	February 27, 1857	
	Henry F. Paige	January 30, 1853	
	Joseph Calvin Paige		
	Walter S. Parker		
	Chauncey Pepin		
	Frank B. Phinney		
	Harry E. Pinkham		
	William Plattner		
	George K. Pond		
	James Tracy Potter	January 26, 1870	
	Arthur K. Reading		
	Abbott B. Rice		
	George Louis Richards		
	Alfred P. Richards		
	Carl J. Rolander		
	Morrill S. Ryder		
	Arthur C. Sampson		
	Roland D. Sawyer	January 8, 1874	
	Leo P. Senecal		
	Henry Lee Shattuck	October 12, 1879	
	Michael F. Shaw	September 12, 1865	
	Charles H. Shaylor		
	Howard Samuel Shepard	September 18, 1865	
	Walter Shuebruk		
	Charles Shulman		
	Coleman Silbert		
	Charles Henry Slowey		
	Almond Smith		
	Jerome S. Smith		
	Dexter Avery Snow	January 3, 1890	
	Walter Herbert Snow		
	Frederick Dexter Sowle		
	Ernest H. Sparrell		
	William L. Stedman		
	Walter F. Stephens		
	Ralph Raymond Stratton		
	Stephen C. Sullivan		
	Albert Austin Sutherland		
	James F. Sweeney		
	Austin M. Sweet		
	John Thomas	January 27, 1859	
	Prince H. Tirrell		
	Joseph D. Toomey		
	James A. Torrey	September 27, 1868	
	James B. Troy		
	Albert T. Wall		
	Charles Spencer Warner		
	Charles C. Warren		
	Frederick A. Warren		
	George M. Webber		
	George Pearl Webster	January 9, 1877	
	Guy L. Weymouth		
	Henry H. Wheelock		
	Renton Whidden		
	Howard B. White		
	Alfred H. Whitney		
	Edward E. Willard	September 25, 1862	
	Herbert Francis Winn		
	William Henry Winnett		
	Isaac U. Wood		
	Harry C. Woodill		
	John Moulton Woods		
	George M. Worrall		
	Samuel H. Wragg	June 9, 1882	
	Benjamin Loring Young	1885	
	James Edward Young		

== See also ==
- 1922 Massachusetts gubernatorial election
- 67th United States Congress
- List of Massachusetts General Courts
