= Henry Lee Shattuck =

American politician

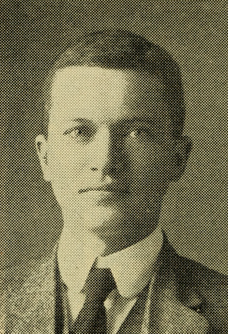
Henry Shattuck Massachusetts House of Representatives member 1920

Henry Lee Shattuck (October 12, 1879 – February 2, 1971) was an American attorney, philanthropist, and politician from Massachusetts.

== Biography ==
Henry Lee Shattuck was born on October 12, 1879 in Brookline, Massachusetts into an Old Stock family of mostly colonial English and some Irish descent. The Shattucks were of Swamp Yankee stock.

Shattuck graduated from Noble and Greenough School in 1897. He then went onto Harvard, from which he graduated with his bachelor's degree in 1901 and his law degree in 1904. He then worked for the law firm Ropes, Gray & Gorham, which made him partner in 1909. He was a member of the Massachusetts House of Representatives from 1920 to 1930 and 1943 to 1949 and represented Ward 5 on the Boston City Council from 1933 to 1941. Politically influential, his endorsement "was a pivotal factor in a number of mayoral elections".

In 1929, Shattuck was appointed to the position of Treasurer of Harvard University, just prior to the onset of the Great Depression. In 1937 he became a senior fellow and served as Harvard's acting president when James B. Conant was out of the country. Other positions included chair of the Boston Municipal Research Bureau and, for 33 years, president of the private North Bennet Street Industrial School.

A supporter of Irish causes despite having a limited Irish ancestry, he served as the Treasurer of the Charitable Irish Society of Boston. He also received honorary degree from the National University of Ireland (1950) and Trinity College, Dublin (1955). He also received honorary degrees from Williams College, Boston College, and his alma mater, Harvard University. Harvard University hosts the Henry Lee Shattuck Professor of Irish Studies and the Henry L. Shattuck Professor of Law at Harvard Law School.

He was a member of the Massachusetts Historical Society (MHS) from 1935 until his death. His personal papers, totaling 84 boxes, are kept at MHS.

== See also ==
- Massachusetts legislature: 1920, 1921–1922, 1923–1924, 1925–1926, 1927–1928, 1929–1930, 1943–1944, 1945–1946, 1947–1948
