= George Costanza (politician) =

American politician (1888–1952)

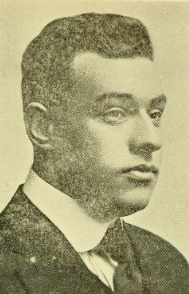

Member of the Massachusetts House of Representatives from the 5th Suffolk district
- In office 1921–1922

Personal details
- Born: July 4, 1888 Boston, Massachusetts, U.S.
- Died: November 27, 1952 (aged 64) Chelsea, Massachusetts, U.S.
- Party: Democratic
- Spouse: Beatrice
- Children: 2
- Education: Tufts College

George Costanza (July 4, 1888 – November 27, 1952) was a state representative in Massachusetts serving from 1921 until 1922, representing the Fifth Suffolk District. He served in the state legislature as a Democrat. He served as Health Inspector of Boston for 35 years.

Costanza was born on July 4, 1888, in Boston. He attended Tufts College. He died in November 1952.

== See also ==
- 1921–1922 Massachusetts legislature
