= Wellington Wells =

American politician (1868–1954)

Wellington Wells Hon.
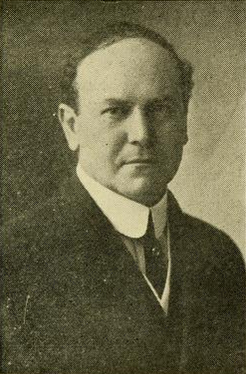

President of the Massachusetts Senate
- In office 1925–1928
- Preceded by: Frank G. Allen
- Succeeded by: Gaspar G. Bacon

Member of the Massachusetts Senate 5th Suffolk Senatorial District
- In office 1920–1928

Member of the Massachusetts House of Representatives
- In office 1919–1919

Personal details
- Born: April 18, 1868 Arlington, Massachusetts
- Died: April 23, 1954 (aged 86) Boston, Massachusetts
- Party: Republican
- Spouse(s): Grace Ewart, m. July 12, 1899, d. July 1902; Jeanie Elizabeth Brewer m. February 8, 1904
- Education: Cambridge Latin School; Harvard College; Harvard Law School
- Profession: Lawyer

Wellington Wells (April 18, 1868 – April 23, 1954) was a Massachusetts lawyer and politician who served as President of the Massachusetts Senate from 1925 to 1928.

Wells was the Assistant Clerk Superior Civil Court of Boston from 1895 to 1901. Wells was a member of the Massachusetts House of Representatives in 1919. Wells was elected in 1920 to represent the fifth Suffolk Senatorial District of the Massachusetts Senate. Wells was elected Senate President in 1925 and remained President until his retirement in 1928. Wells died on April 23, 1954, at Massachusetts General Hospital.

== See also ==
- Willard Homestead (Harrisville, New Hampshire), Wells' summer house
- 1919 Massachusetts legislature
- 1920 Massachusetts legislature
- 1921–1922 Massachusetts legislature
- 1923–1924 Massachusetts legislature
- 1925–1926 Massachusetts legislature
- 1927–1928 Massachusetts legislature

Political offices
Preceded by Frank G. Allen	President of the Massachusetts Senate; 1925-1928	Succeeded by Gaspar G. Bacon
