= Frederick H. Gillett =

American politician (1851–1935)

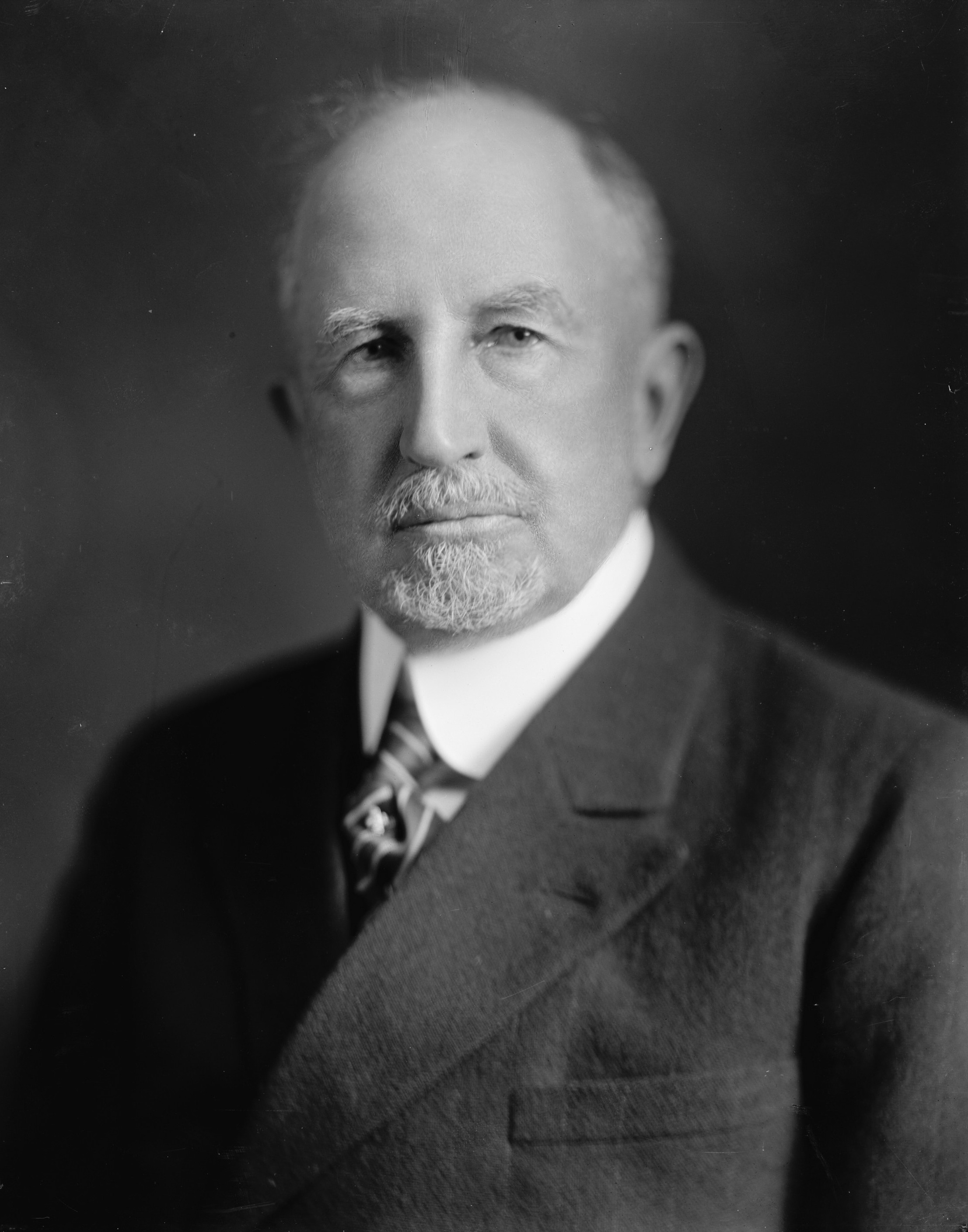
- Gillett, 1905–1935

United States Senator from Massachusetts
- In office March 4, 1925 – March 3, 1931
- Preceded by: David I. Walsh
- Succeeded by: Marcus A. Coolidge

37th Speaker of the United States House of Representatives
- In office December 5, 1923 – March 3, 1925
- Preceded by: Champ Clark
- Succeeded by: Nicholas Longworth
- In office May 19, 1919 – December 3, 1923
- Preceded by: multi-ballot election
- Succeeded by: vacancy resolved

Leader of the House Republican Conference
- In office May 19, 1919 – March 3, 1925
- Preceded by: James Robert Mann
- Succeeded by: Nicholas Longworth

Member of the U.S. House of Representatives from Massachusetts's 2nd district
- In office March 4, 1893 – March 3, 1925
- Preceded by: Elijah A. Morse
- Succeeded by: George B. Churchill

Member of the Massachusetts House of Representatives
- In office 1890–1891

Personal details
- Born: Frederick Huntington Gillett; October 16, 1851 Westfield, Massachusetts, U.S.
- Died: July 31, 1935 (aged 83) Springfield, Massachusetts, U.S.
- Resting place: Pine Hill Cemetery, Westfield, Massachusetts
- Party: Republican
- Spouse: Christine Rice Hoar
- Education: Amherst College (BA); Harvard University (LLB)
- Profession: Lawyer

Frederick Huntington Gillett (/dʒɪˈlɛt/; October 16, 1851 – July 31, 1935) was an American politician who served as the 42nd speaker of the United States House of Representatives from 1919 to 1925 and as a U.S. senator from Massachusetts from 1925 to 1931. A Republican, Gillett first began his career in politics when he served in the Massachusetts House of Representatives from 1890 to 1891, and would go on to serve in the House from 1893 to 1925. In 1924, at age 73, he became the oldest individual elected to a first term in the U.S. Senate, a record that he would hold until Peter Welch's victory in the 2022 United States Senate election in Vermont at age 75.

== Early life and education ==
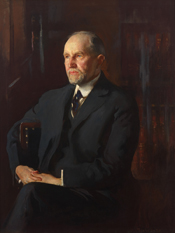
Gillett in 1920

Frederick H. Gillett was born in Westfield, Massachusetts, to Edward Bates Gillett (1817–1899) and Lucy Fowler Gillett (1830–1916). He graduated from Amherst College, where he was a member of the Alpha Delta Phi fraternity, in 1874 and Harvard Law School in 1877. He entered the practice of law in Springfield in 1877.

== Career ==
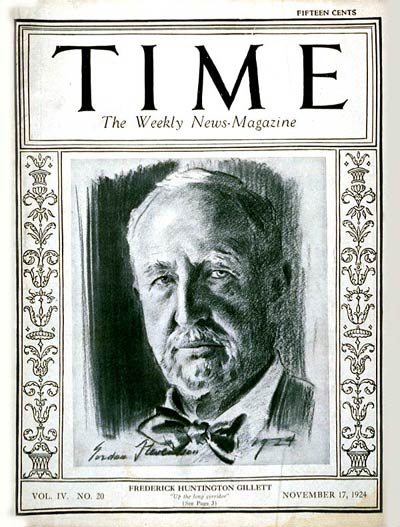
Time cover, November 17, 1924

Gillett was the Assistant Attorney General of Massachusetts from 1879 to 1882. For two one-year terms he was a member of the Massachusetts House of Representatives. He was elected to the Fifty-third United States Congress in 1892.

A Republican, Gillett served in the United States House of Representatives from 1893 to 1925. On January 24, 1914, he introduced legislation to initiate the adoption of an Anti-Polygamy Amendment to the U.S. Constitution.

Republicans gained a net total of 24 seats in the 1918 elections, increasing the size of their majority in the House. Gillett was nominated by the Republican caucus for Speaker of the House in the upcoming 66th United States Congress. On May 19, 1919, Congress convened, and he was elected speaker, defeating the Democratic incumbent Champ Clark 228–172. Gillett was expected to exercise less control than his predecessor, since he was characterized by one reporter as someone who did not drink coffee in the morning "for fear it would keep him awake all day". He was reelected as speaker in 1921 and again in 1923.

In 1923, votes cast by the Progressive wing of the GOP resulted in multiple ballots as no Speaker candidate gained a majority. On the ninth ballot, after the Republican leadership agreed to Progressive procedural reforms, Gillett was eventually elected. This was the only time in the 20th century that the House failed to elect a Speaker during the first roll call, and the 14th time in history that election of the Speaker required multiple ballots. The previous occurrence was in 1859 for the 36th Congress, which elected William Pennington after 44 ballots. The next occurrence was a century later in 2023 for the 118th Congress, which elected Kevin McCarthy after 15 ballots.

Gillett decided to run for the United States Senate in 1924. He won the Republican primary easily over two other candidates and then narrowly defeated incumbent Senator David I. Walsh in the Republican landslide of November 1924 led by President Calvin Coolidge, a former governor of Massachusetts. He was at the time the oldest person ever elected to a first term in the Senate, a record that would stand for 98 years. Time magazine chose him for its November 17, 1924 cover. He served one term in the Senate from 1925 to 1931, and decided not to seek re-election in the face of a difficult primary challenge. In June 1930, he declined to state his position on prohibition or its repeal when queried by prohibition advocates.

== Personal life ==
On November 25, 1915, Gillett married Christine Rice Hoar, the widow of his former colleague in Congress, Rockwood Hoar. In 1934, he published a biography of George Frisbie Hoar, an earlier congressman and senator from Massachusetts, and his wife's father-in-law from her previous marriage.

During his time in Washington, Gillett spent his free time driving his 1926 Pontiac Coupe and playing golf in the morning. In retirement, he wintered in Pasadena, California. He died in a hospital in Springfield, Massachusetts, on July 31, 1935. Gillett was buried at Pine Hill Cemetery in Westfield.

Party political offices
| Preceded by John W. Weeks | Republican nominee for U.S. Senator from Massachusetts (Class 2); 1924 | Succeeded by William M. Butler |
U.S. House of Representatives
| Preceded by Elijah A. Morse | Member of the U.S. House of Representatives from Massachusetts's 2nd congressional district March 4, 1893 – March 3, 1925 | Succeeded by George B. Churchill |
Political offices
| Preceded by Champ Clark | Speaker of the United States House of Representatives; May 19, 1919 – March 4, 1921; April 11, 1921 – March 3, 1923; December 3, 1923 – March 3, 1925 | Succeeded by Nicholas Longworth |
U.S. Senate
| Preceded by David I. Walsh | U.S. senator (Class 2) from Massachusetts; March 4, 1925 – March 3, 1931; Served alongside: William M. Butler, David I. Walsh | Succeeded by Marcus A. Coolidge |
