= 1928 United States Senate election in Massachusetts =

- November 6, 1928
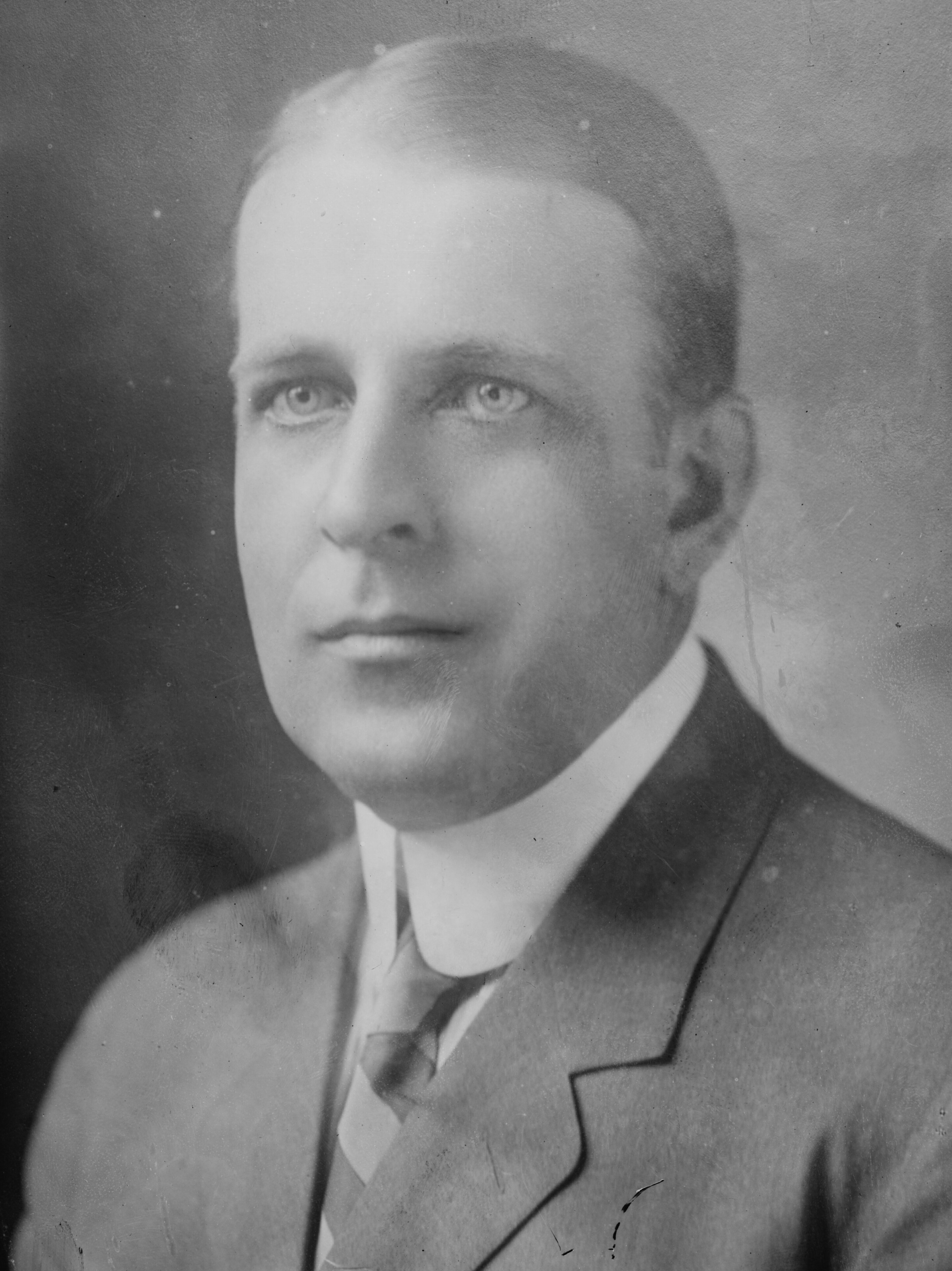

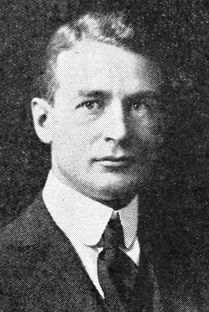
Nominee	David I. Walsh	Benjamin Loring Young
Party	Democratic	Republican
Popular vote	818,055	693,563
Percentage	53.65%	45.48%
- Walsh: 40–50% 50–60% 60–70% 70–80% 80–90% Young: 40–50% 50–60% 60–70% 70–80% 80–90% >90%
Senator before election
David I. Walsh
Democratic
Elected Senator
David I. Walsh
Democratic

The 1928 United States Senate election in Massachusetts was held on November 6, 1928. Democratic incumbent David I. Walsh, who had won a special election to complete the unexpired term of Henry Cabot Lodge, defeated Benjamin Loring Young to win an election to a second, full term.

== Democratic primary ==
=== Candidates ===
- David I. Walsh, incumbent U.S. senator since 1926

=== Results ===
Senator Walsh was unopposed for renomination.

1928 Democratic U.S. Senate primary results
Party	Candidate	Votes	%
Democratic	David I. Walsh (incumbent)	206,343	100.00
Write-in	All others	8	0.00
Turnout		206,351	100.00

== Republican primary ==
=== Candidates ===
- Butler Ames, former U.S. representative from Lowell and candidate for Senate in 1911
- Eben Draper Jr., former state senator from Hopedale and son of Eben Draper
- Benjamin Loring Young, Weston selectman and former speaker of the Massachusetts House of Representatives

==== Withdrawn ====
- Robert M. Washburn, former state senator from Worcester (endorsed Ames)

=== Results ===
1928 Republican U.S. Senate primary results
Party	Candidate	Votes	%
Republican	Benjamin Loring Young	166,373	41.13
Republican	Eben S. Draper Jr.	143,667	35.52
Republican	Butler Ames	94,476	23.36
Write-in	All others	23	0.00
Turnout		404,539	100.00

== General election ==
=== Candidates ===
- John J. Ballam, founding member of the Communist Party of America (Workers')
- Alfred Baker Lewis, candidate for Senate in 1926 (Socialist)
- David I. Walsh, incumbent U.S. senator since 1926 (Democratic)
- Benjamin Loring Young, Weston selectman and former speaker of the Massachusetts House of Representatives (Republican)

=== Results ===
1928 U.S. Senate election in Massachusetts
Party	Candidate	Votes	%	±%
Democratic	David I. Walsh (incumbent)	818,055	53.65	▲1.64
Republican	Benjamin Loring Young	693,563	45.48	▼1.06
Socialist	Alfred Baker Lewis	7,675	0.50	▲0.03
Workers	John J. Ballam	5,621	0.37	▲0.14
Total votes		1,524,914	100.00%	
