= Marcus A. Coolidge =

American politician (1865–1947)

Marcus Allen Coolidge
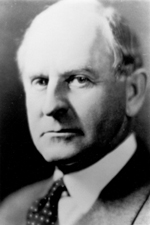

United States Senator from Massachusetts
- In office March 4, 1931 – January 3, 1937
- Preceded by: Frederick H. Gillett
- Succeeded by: Henry Cabot Lodge Jr.

Mayor of Fitchburg, Massachusetts
- In office 1916–1917
- Preceded by: Benjamin A. Cook
- Succeeded by: Frank H. Foss

Personal details
- Born: October 6, 1865 Westminster, Massachusetts, U.S.
- Died: January 23, 1947 (aged 81) Miami Beach, Florida, U.S.
- Party: Democratic
- Spouse: Ethel Louise Warren
- Children: 3
- Education: Bryant & Stratton College
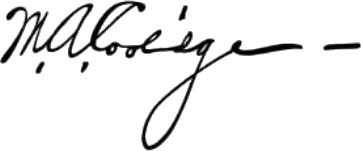
- Signature

Marcus Allen Coolidge (October 6, 1865 – January 23, 1947) was a Democratic United States senator representing Massachusetts from March 4, 1931, to January 3, 1937.

== Biography ==
Coolidge was born in Westminster, Massachusetts, son of Frederick Spaulding Coolidge. Through his father, he was descended from both John Coolidge (1604–1691) and Thomas Hastings who came from the East Anglia region of England to the Massachusetts Bay Colony, in 1630 and 1634 respectively.

After attending public schools and Bryant & Stratton Commercial College at its former Boston, Massachusetts, campus, Coolidge worked with his father's company in manufacturing chairs and rattan. He later worked in the contracting business, building street railways, water works, and bridges.

In 1916, Coolidge was elected mayor of Fitchburg, Massachusetts. In 1919, President Woodrow Wilson appointed Coolidge as special envoy to Poland to represent the Peace Commission. He became chairman of the Democratic state convention in 1920. That year he was defeated for lieutenant governor by Republican Congressman Alvan T. Fuller. Coolidge also served as trustee and president of the Cushing Academy at Ashburnham, Massachusetts.

After being elected to the United States Senate in 1930, Coolidge served as chairman of the Committee on Immigration for the Seventy-third and Seventy-fourth Congresses, but was not a candidate for renomination in 1936.

After leaving the Senate, Coolidge returned to Fitchburg and his former business pursuits. He died at St. Francis Hospital in Miami Beach, Florida, in 1947, aged 81, and is interred at Mount Pleasant Cemetery in Westminster, Massachusetts. He donated substantial land to the city of Fitchburg for a recreational park located in the north section. The park bearing his last name is the largest in the city and bears an engraved stone memorializing his notable activities and public contributions.

He was a "distant relative" of Massachusetts Governor and President of the United States Calvin Coolidge.

Coolidge was the father-in-law of Secretary of War Harry Hines Woodring and Mayor Robert E. Greenwood of Fitchburg, Massachusetts.

== Sources ==
- United States Congress. "Marcus A. Coolidge (id: C000740)". Biographical Directory of the United States Congress.

Party political offices
Preceded by John F. J. Herbert	Democratic nominee for Lieutenant Governor of Massachusetts; 1920	Succeeded by John F. Doherty
Preceded by David I. Walsh	Democratic nominee for U.S. Senator from Massachusetts (Class 2); 1930	Succeeded by James Michael Curley
U.S. Senate
Preceded by Frederick H. Gillett	U.S. senator (Class 2) from Massachusetts; 1931-1937; Served alongside: David I. Walsh	Succeeded by Henry Cabot Lodge Jr.
