= David I. Walsh =

American politician (1872–1947)

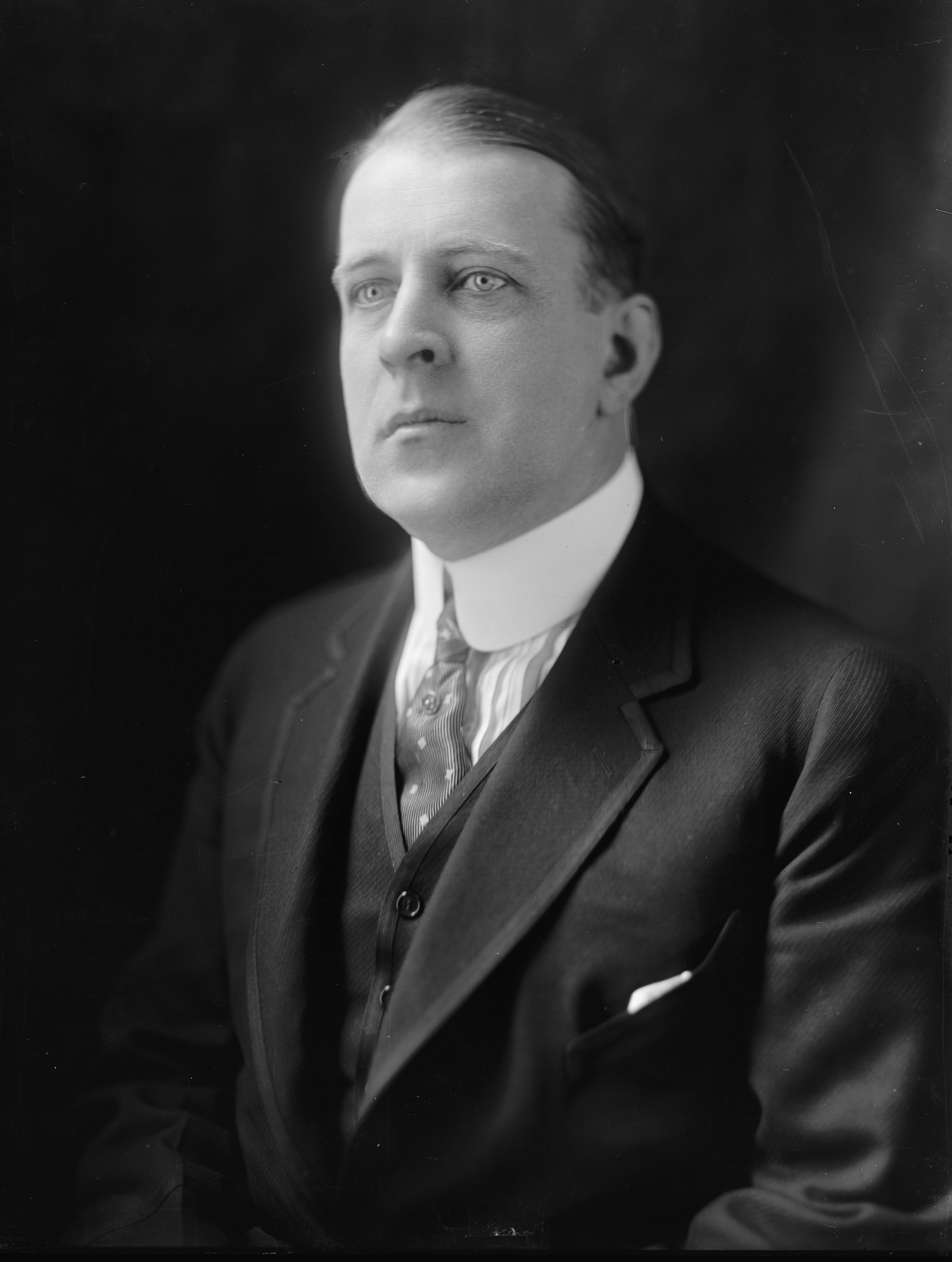
- Portrait by Harris & Ewing

United States Senator from Massachusetts
- In office December 6, 1926 – January 3, 1947
- Preceded by: William M. Butler
- Succeeded by: Henry Cabot Lodge Jr.
- In office March 4, 1919 – March 3, 1925
- Preceded by: John W. Weeks
- Succeeded by: Frederick H. Gillett

Chair of the National Governors Association
- In office November 10, 1914 – August 24, 1915
- Preceded by: Francis E. McGovern
- Succeeded by: William Spry

46th Governor of Massachusetts
- In office January 8, 1914 – January 6, 1916
- Lieutenant: Edward P. Barry; Grafton D. Cushing
- Preceded by: Eugene Foss
- Succeeded by: Samuel W. McCall

43rd Lieutenant Governor of Massachusetts
- In office January 7, 1913 – January 8, 1914
- Governor: Eugene Foss
- Preceded by: Robert Luce
- Succeeded by: Edward P. Barry

Personal details
- Born: David Ignatius Walsh; November 11, 1872 Leominster, Massachusetts, U.S.
- Died: June 11, 1947 (aged 74) Boston, Massachusetts, U.S.
- Party: Democratic
- Education: College of the Holy Cross (BA); Boston University (LLB)

David Ignatius Walsh (November 11, 1872 – June 11, 1947) was an American politician from Massachusetts. A member of the Democratic Party, he served as the 46th governor of Massachusetts before winning election to five terms in the United States Senate, becoming the first Irish Catholic from Massachusetts to fill either office.

Born in Leominster, Massachusetts, Walsh was educated at the College of the Holy Cross, subsequently entering a legal practice in Boston after graduating from the Boston University School of Law. He served in the Massachusetts House of Representatives from 1900 to 1901, establishing a reputation as an anti-imperialist and isolationist. In 1912, he won election as the 43rd lieutenant governor, becoming the state's first Democratic lieutenant governor in seventy years. He served as governor from 1914 to 1916 and led a successful effort to call for a state constitutional convention.

Walsh won election to the Senate in 1918, earning a reputation as a supporter of Irish independence and as a strong opponent of the Treaty of Versailles. He lost his re-election bid in 1924 but returned to the Senate two years later. Walsh supported Al Smith over Franklin D. Roosevelt at the 1932 Democratic National Convention. During the Roosevelt Administration, he introduced the Walsh-Healey Act that established labor standards for government contractors. Prior to the attack on Pearl Harbor, Walsh opposed American involvement in World War II and was a leading member of the America First Committee. However, in a reversal from his earlier stance on the League of Nations, he voted to ratify the United Nations Charter in 1946.

Walsh lost his 1946 re-election bid to Henry Cabot Lodge Jr. and died the following year. A maverick in the Senate who regularly broke with his own party, he was remembered chiefly for his isolationism, as well as his passionate defense of Irish and Catholic interests. Walsh, who never married, was also dogged by accusations of homosexuality during his lifetime, including a sensationalized scandal in his final term that he privately called "a tragic Gethsemane" to his political career.

== Early life and education ==
Walsh was born in Leominster, Massachusetts, on November 11, 1872, the ninth of ten children. His parents were Irish Catholic immigrants. Walsh attended public schools in his birthplace and later in Clinton, Massachusetts. His father, a comb maker, died when he was twelve. Thereafter, his mother ran a boarding house.

Walsh graduated from Clinton High School in 1890 and from the College of the Holy Cross in 1893. He attended Boston University Law School, where he graduated in 1897. Walsh was admitted to the bar and commenced the practice of law in Fitchburg, Massachusetts, in 1897, later practicing in Boston.

== Career in state politics ==
Walsh was a member of the Massachusetts House of Representatives for two terms in 1900 and 1901, elected from a longtime Republican district. From the start of his political career, he was anti-imperialist and isolationist and opposed America's authority over the Philippines as part of the settlement of the Spanish–American War. Walsh's vote to restrict the hours that women and children could work to 58 led to his defeat when he sought another term. He next lost the race for Lieutenant Governor of Massachusetts in 1910, but ran again and won in 1912, becoming the state's first Democratic lieutenant governor in 70 years. He became the first Irish and the first Catholic Governor of Massachusetts in 1914, successfully challenging the incumbent Democratic governor Eugene Foss for the party nomination, and then defeating a divided Republican opposition (and Foss, who ran as an independent) with a comfortable plurality. He served two one-year terms.

He offered voters an alternative to boss-dominated politics, expressing a "forthright espousal of government responsibility for social welfare". Walsh proposed increased government responsibility for charity work and the care of the insane and reorganized the state's management of these areas with little opposition. In his 1914 campaign for re-election, he cited as accomplishments an increase in the amounts paid for workman's compensation and improved administration of the state's care for the insane. As governor, Walsh fought unsuccessfully for a Women's Suffrage Amendment to the Massachusetts Constitution. He also campaigned for film censorship in the state after large protests were mounted against the racial depictions in D. W. Griffith's film The Birth of a Nation. Several progressive labor laws were also introduced during his time as governor.

He supported the work of the Anti-Death Penalty League, a Massachusetts organization founded in 1897 that was particularly active and nearly successful in the decade preceding World War I.

As governor he asked the legislature to call a Constitutional Convention without success. When the legislature later called a convention, Walsh won election as a delegate-at-large as part of a slate of candidates who endorsed adding provisions for initiative and referendum to the state constitution, key Progressive-era reforms. He served as a delegate-at-large to the Massachusetts Constitutional Convention in 1917 and 1918 that saw those reforms passed. His speech on behalf of initiative and referendum shows him in the role of populist and reformer:

There are men—and you and I know them—who, though proclaiming their belief in democracy, really are believers in autocracy. There are men within the knowledge of us all who believe in a government of the few, of the college bred class only, of those only who have been successful in the commercial world, or those only who have been fortunate enough to have been born in an environment of ease and luxury. To this class of men no argument on the initiative and referendum can be addressed with any confidence of success. Consciously or unconsciously, they are recreant to the principles upon which this republic was founded.

In 1914, Walsh was challenged for the governorship by Samuel W. McCall, a moderate Republican. He narrowly won reelection, probably due to the presence of a Progressive (Bull Moose) candidate who took votes from McCall. McCall successfully reunited the Republicans and the Progressives the next year, and defeated Walsh, in part by supporting Walsh's call for a constitutional convention.

Walsh returned to the practice of law after leaving office, working with his older brother Thomas in his hometown of Clinton.

== Career in national politics ==
In 1918, Walsh was elected as a Democrat to the United States Senate, serving his first term from March 4, 1919, to March 3, 1925. He was the first Irish Catholic senator from Massachusetts, and second Massachusetts senator to be elected by popular vote, after the passage of the Seventeenth Amendment to the United States Constitution. A noted orator, he introduced Irish Republic President Éamon de Valera at Fenway Park on June 29, 1919.

Walsh broke with Democratic President Woodrow Wilson on the subject of the Treaty of Versailles, joining fellow Massachusetts senator (and Republican) Henry Cabot Lodge in opposition. His initial objections stemmed from the fact that the proposed League of Nations would "make secure and assured the rights of every single nation in the world except Ireland." In general, he felt that the Treaty failed to adequately provide for the right to self-determination, which had been articulated in Wilson's Fourteen Points. Walsh also became a vocal critic of Article 10, which would have allowed the League of Nations to make war without a vote by the US Congress. Consequently he was labeled one of the "Irreconcilables", a bloc of 12–18 mostly Republican senators who refused to pass the treaty even with the "reservations" proposed by Lodge.

At the Democratic National Convention in 1924, he spoke in favor of condemning the Ku Klux Klan by name in the party platform: "We ask you to cut out of the body politic with the sharpest instrument at your command this malignant growth which, injected, means the destruction of everything which has made America immortal. If you can denounce Republicanism, you can denounce Ku Kluxism. If you can denounce Bolshevism, you can denounce Ku Kluxism." Walsh was one of nine Senators to oppose the Immigration Act of 1924.

Walsh failed to win reelection by just 20,000 votes in 1924, the year of the Coolidge landslide, and briefly resumed the practice of law in Boston. Following the death of Senator Henry Cabot Lodge, the Republicans fought hard to retain his seat. Though Herbert Hoover and Charles Evans Hughes campaigned for his opponent, in the November 1926 special election Walsh won the right to complete the remaining two years of Lodge's term, defeating William Morgan Butler, a friend of Coolidge and head of the Republican National Committee.

Walsh's 1924 defeat also marked a turning point in his political philosophy. He had previously endorsed an activist role for government, but after 1924 his rhetoric increasingly attacked the "federal bureaucracy" and "big government". Though he had once advocated in favor of federal child labor legislation, he became one of its most consistent opponents.

In 1929, Time published a detailed profile of Walsh and his voting record. It noted that he voted for the Jones Act of 1929 that increased penalties for the violation of Prohibition, but said the Senator "votes Wet, drinks Wet". Its more personal description said:

A bachelor, he is tall and stout. A double chin tends to get out over his tight-fitting collar. His stomach bulges over his belt. He weighs 200 lbs. or more. Setting-up exercises every other day at a Washington health centre have failed to reduce his girth. He is troubled about it. His dress is dandified. He wears silk shirts in bright colors and stripes and, often, stiff collars to match. His feet are small and well-shod. Beneath his habitual derby hat his hair is turning thin and grey. Society is his prime diversion. Of secondary interest are motoring, sporting events, the theatre. In Washington he occupies an expensive suite of rooms at the luxurious Carlton Hotel on 16th Street. A good and frequent host himself, he accepts all invitations out, is one of the most lionized Senators in Washington.

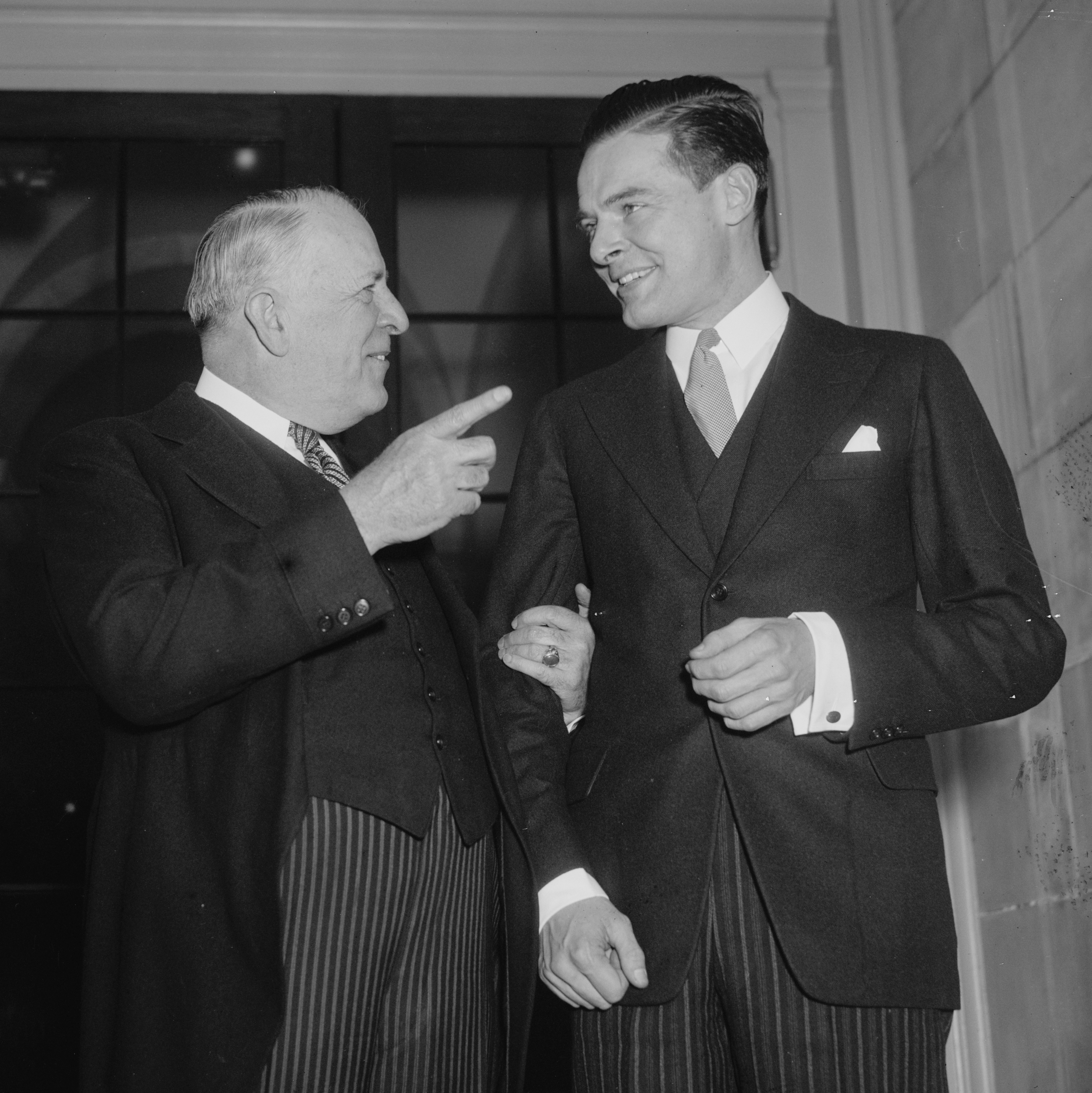
Walsh and then incoming junior senator Henry Cabot Lodge Jr.

Time reported that some commented on the contrast between his political populism and his luxurious life style. The profile noted he was a "gruff and bull-voiced debater" but that "in private conversation his voice is soft and controlled." In sum, Time said that "Impartial Senate observers rate him thus: A good practical politician, a legislator above the average. His political philosophy is liberal and humane, except on economic matters (the tariff) which affect the New England industry, when he turns conservative. His floor attendance is regular, his powers of persuasion, fair."

When attacking the Hoover administration following the 1930 elections, Walsh identified two principal causes of voter dissatisfaction: "the administration's indifference to economic conditions and its failure to recognize the widespread opposition to prohibition".

Walsh won reelection in 1928, 1934 and 1940, failing in his final bid for reelection in 1946. During his Senate service, Walsh held the posts of chairman of the Committee on Education and Labor (73rd and 74th Congresses) and of the Committee on Naval Affairs (74th-77th and 79th Congresses). In 1932, he supported Al Smith against FDR for the Democratic nomination for president. He objected to Justice Hugo Black's failure to disclose his earlier membership in the Ku Klux Klan and promoted the appointment of Jews to the judiciary, notably that of Supreme Court Justice Louis Brandeis, a longtime friend. Though a Democrat, he gave only reluctant support to President Roosevelt's agenda. In 1936, when some Democrats looked for an alternative presidential candidate, he supported Roosevelt, "although their relations are none too good". A newspaper reported that "He is not of the insurgent type ... At heart, observers [in Boston] say, he dissents from many of the policies of the New Deal", but "he will stay on the reservation" and "he will avoid an open break". During the campaign, he failed to speak in support of the President until October 20, 1936.

In 1936, Walsh, as head of the Senate Labor Committee, lent his name an administration bill to establish labor standards for employees of government contractors, known as the Walsh–Healey Public Contracts Act It provided for minimum wages and overtime, safety and sanitation rules, and restrictions on the use of child and convict labor.

In 1937, he declared himself an opponent of the administration and joined the opposition to FDR's plan to enlarge the Supreme Court. Speaking at New York City's Carnegie Hall, Walsh argued his position in terms of the separation of powers, judicial independence, and the proper role of the executive. He described the public's reaction as "a state of fear, of apprehension, of bewilderment, of real grief, as a result of the proposal to impair, if not indeed to destroy, the judicial independence of the Supreme Court". He also emphasized the role of the Court in protecting civil liberties, citing two examples:

One was the enactment, during the war hysteria, of a law in one of the sovereign States making it a crime to teach a child the German language ... [A] teacher in a German-language school was indicted and convicted ... The United States Supreme Court, nine old men, sworn to uphold the Constitution, struck down that law and released from jeopardy an American citizen whose only offense was that he was a victim of war hysteria. I wonder if young men would have had the courage to do it. Another was an outburst during the Ku Klux Klan hysteria. A State Legislature and the Governor approved a law, supported by an initiative vote of the people, denying a parent the right to send his child to a religious school of his choosing. An independent judiciary, the United States Supreme Court, nine old men, struck down that law and proclaimed that it is an unalienable right under the Constitution for a parent to bring up his children and educate them as he may choose.

He continued:

Who can say when some majority of the moment may attempt to harass a minority? Who dares predict that a future Congress in a time of hysteria may not succumb to the prejudice or passion of the hour ... Without an independent judiciary, I hesitate to even think of denials to minorities of constitutional guarantees if some of the doctrines preached by groups in this country today should be enacted into law.

One Cabinet official described his overall relationship to the administration as "not sympathetic ... to put it mildly".

Despite his differences with the Roosevelt Administration, Walsh was nevertheless ideologically progressive, supporting various social reform proposals during the course of the Roosevelt presidency such as those aimed at improving housing, social security, and working conditions.

Along with four of his colleagues, Walsh condemned antisemitism in Nazi Germany in a Senate speech on June 10, 1933.

=== World War II ===
Immediately following the defeat of France, Walsh was the sponsor, along with Representative Vinson, of the Vinson–Walsh Act of July 1940 that increased the size of the U.S. Navy by 70 percent. It included seven battleships, 18 aircraft carriers and 15,000 aircraft.

In the Senate, Walsh was a consistent isolationist He supported American neutrality with respect to the Spanish Civil War and opposed an American alliance with the United Kingdom until the attack on Pearl Harbor. Speaking in the Senate on June 21, 1940, he denounced Roosevelt's plans to provide armaments to Great Britain:

I say it is too risky, too dangerous, to try to determine how far we can go tapping the resources of our own Government and furnishing naval vessels, air planes, powder and bombs. It is trampling on dangerous ground. It is moving toward the edge of a precipice—a precipice of stupendous and horrifying depths ... I do not want our forces deprived of one gun, or one bomb, or one ship which can aid that American boy whom you and I may some day have to draft. I want every instrument. I want every bomb. I want every plane. I want every boat ready and available. So I can say when and if it becomes necessary to draft him: "Young man, you have every possible weapon of defense your Government can give you."

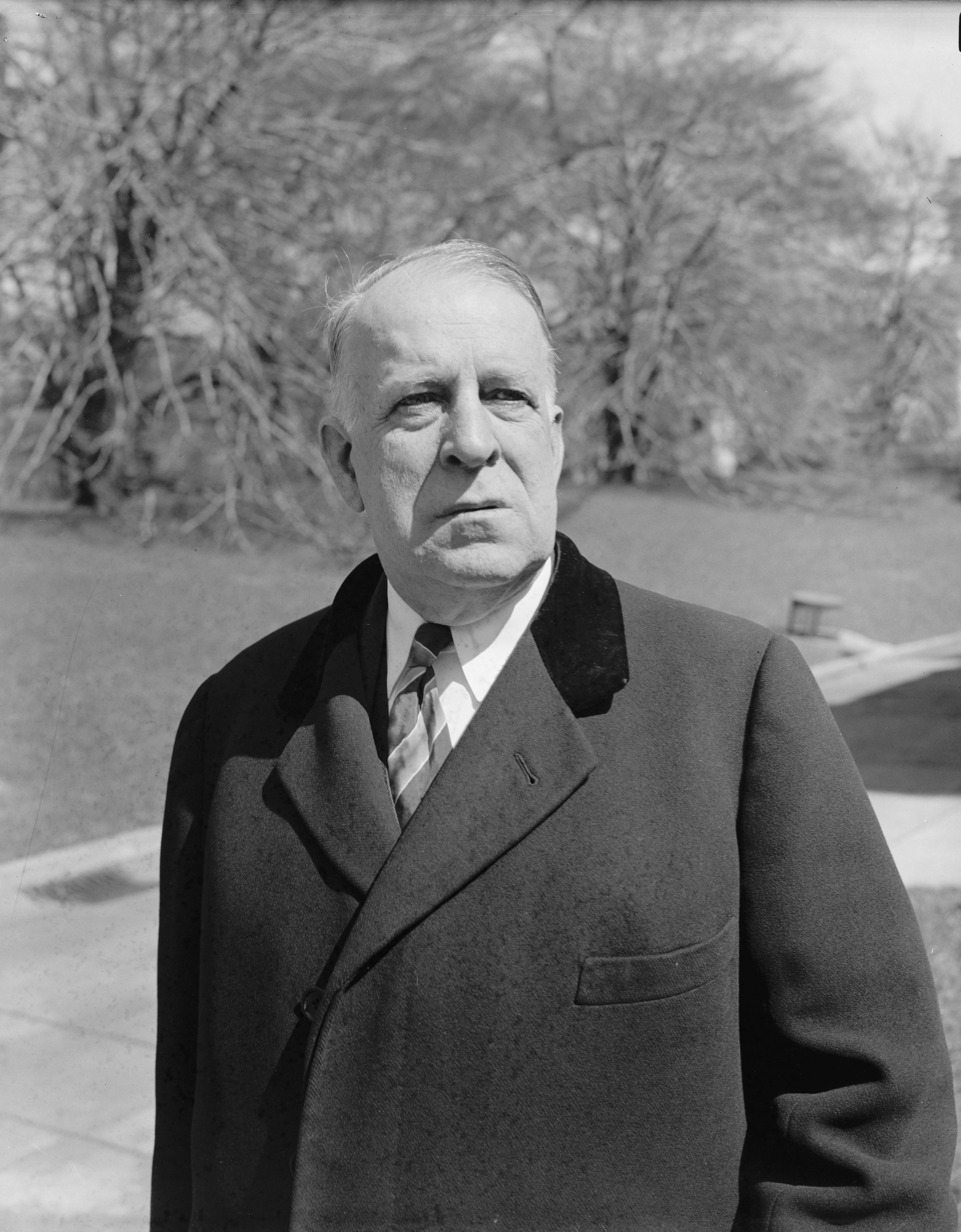
Walsh in 1939

At the 1940 Democratic National Convention, where Walsh supported James Farley for president rather than FDR, he and his fellow isolationist Senator Burton Wheeler of Montana proposed a plank for the party platform that read: "We will not participate in foreign wars and we will not send our army or navy or air force to fight in foreign lands outside of the Americas." When the President added the words "except in case of attack", they accepted the change. In that year's election, he out-polled Roosevelt in Massachusetts despite being opposed by the CIO for his anti-New Deal positions.

After the 1940 election in particular, he opposed any action that would compromise American neutrality, first in closed-door hearings of the Naval Affairs Committee, which he headed, and then in attacking the Lend-Lease program on the floor of the Senate. He was a leading member of the America First movement, opposing U.S. involvement in World War II. In 1940, The New York Times described Walsh as a "more moderate critic" of the administration's attempts to aid Great Britain even as he called the August commitment FDR made to Churchill one "that goes far beyond the Constitutional powers of the President and one that no other President in our history even presumed to assume. ... The President alone, and on his own initiative, has undertaken to pledge our government, our nation, and the lives of 130,000,000 persons and their descendants for generations to come."

When the Senate considered the Burke–Wadsworth Act to establish peacetime conscription for the first time in U.S. history, Walsh offered an amendment, which failed to pass, that would have delayed the law's effective date until war was declared. In June 1940, he authored an amendment to the naval appropriations bill, sometimes called the Walsh Act of 1940, which permitted "surplus military equipment" to be sold only if it was certified as useless for American defense. To aid Great Britain, the administration evaded the Walsh provision by substituting leases for sales and by trading equipment for bases. In 1941, when the administration used the Greer incident, an exchange of fire between a German submarine and an American destroyer, to authorize American forces to "shoot on sight", Walsh held hearings of the Naval Affairs Committee to demonstrate that the administration was misrepresenting the facts of the encounter to support its case for American military action against Germany. Walsh also was an outspoken fan of the periodical Social Justice, published by Father Charles Coughlin.

=== "House of Degradation" scandal ===
On May 7, 1942, the New York Post, which had long favored U.S. involvement in the European conflict, implicated Walsh in a sensational sex and spy scandal uncovered at a Brooklyn male brothel for U.S. Navy personnel that had been infiltrated by Nazi spies. The charges went unreported by the rest of the press, but word of mouth made it, according to Time, "one of the worst scandals that ever affected a member of the Senate." The police operation led to the arrest and conviction of three foreign agents and the brothel's owner-operator, Gustave Beekman. Though promised leniency for cooperating with the police, Beekman received the maximum sentence of 20 years for sodomy and was not released from prison until 1963.

The scandal was complex in that it implicated the Senator as a homosexual, as a patron of a male bordello, and as a possible dupe of enemy agents. Homosexuality was a taboo subject for public discourse, so the Post referred to a "house of degradation". At one point a sub-headline in The New York Times called it a "Resort". In the Daily Mirror, columnist Walter Winchell mentioned "Brooklyn's spy nest, also known as the swastika swishery." The Post first suggested a scandal. Over the course of several weeks it hinted an important person was involved, then named "Senator X", and finally identified Walsh by name. Its sensational treatment of the story detracted from the seriousness of its charges. The Post was not alone in its coyness; before Walsh was named, Winchell teased that the mystery man was "one of four Senators with the same last initial...the 23rd letter of the alphabet."

The brothel's owner and several others arrested in a police raid identified Walsh to the police as "Doc", a regular client, whose visits ended just before police surveillance began. Some furnished intimate physical details. President Roosevelt believed the charge that Walsh was homosexual was true. He told Vice President Henry Wallace that "everyone knew" about Walsh's homosexuality and he had a similar conversation with Alben W. Barkley, the Senate majority leader.

Without discussing details, Walsh issued a brief statement calling the story "a diabolical lie" and demanding a full investigation. He then conducted his usual Senate business without reference to the charges. An FBI investigation produced no evidence to support the New York Post's specific charges against the Senator, though it accumulated much "derogatory information" in its files.

On May 20, 1942, with a full report from FBI Director J. Edgar Hoover in hand, Senator Barkley addressed the Senate at length on the irresponsibility of the New York Post, the laudable restraint of the rest of the press, the details of the FBI's report, and the Senate's affirmation of Walsh's "unsullied" reputation. He declined to insert the FBI report in the Congressional Record, he said, "because it contains disgusting and unprintable things". Without addressing Walsh's sexuality, he said the report contained no evidence that Walsh ever "visited a 'house of degradation' to connive or to consort with, or to converse with, or to conspire with anyone who is the enemy of the United States". He denied the charges related to espionage. He provided no specifics about the sexual activity at issue and said the details of the charges were "too loathsome to mention in the Senate or in any group of ladies and gentlemen". The press conflated the charges in a similar way. For example, The New York Times report of Barkley's speech said that the FBI reported that "there is not the 'slightest foundation' for charges that Senator Walsh, 69-year-old chairman of the Naval Affairs Committee, visited a 'house of degradation' in Brooklyn and was seen talking to Nazi agents there."

Isolationist senators promptly denounced the charges as an attack on their political position. Senator Bennett Clark asserted that Morris Ernst, attorney for the New York Post, had contacted the White House trying to engage the administration to smear FDR's opposition. Senator Gerald Nye contended the incident represented a larger effort on the part of a "secret society" that for two years had been trying to discredit him and his fellow isolationists.

The press used these Senate speeches to cover the affair at last. Their treatment varied in tone:

- The Boston Globe: Senator Walsh Story Denounced as Absolute Fabrication
- The New York Times: FBI Clears Walsh, Barkley Asserts
- New York Post: Whitewash for Walsh

Time reported Barkley's speech exonerating Walsh and that the Post in reply had repeated its charges. It concluded its coverage: "The known facts made only one thing indisputable: either a serious scandal was being hushed up or a really diabolical libel had been perpetrated." In private, the New York Post's publisher became concerned about the newspaper's libel exposure and hired a team led by Daniel Doran to conduct an investigation into Walsh's behavior and the Post's own reporting. Doran learned that Walsh had been in attendance at the Senate in Washington at the same times he was alleged to have been visiting the gay brothel. "Not a single item of legal evidence has been obtained," Doran reported back to the Post, which never amended or corrected its reporting.

=== Final Senate years ===
During the 1944 presidential race, with FDR seeking a fourth term, his running mate Harry S. Truman referred to Walsh as an "isolationist", a characterization Walsh resented. On November 2, just five days before the election, the President called Walsh at his home in Clinton, Massachusetts, and invited him to join the presidential party in Worcester, Massachusetts. Walsh accepted the invitation to the relief of the Democrats. The contretemps gave Walsh an opportunity to define his position, that he was no isolationist because he favored the war and seeing the war through to total victory. He also believed the troops should return home quickly, allowing only that some may be required to perform "police duties in enemy territory", and the reserves demobilized. He hoped for a "democratic peace ... free from the influences of political expediency which compromises with imperialism and surrenders to power politics".

In 1945, demonstrating that his isolationism was not absolute, Walsh voted in favor of the United Nations Charter. He was one of a dozen senators who protested the failure of the United Nations to invite a Jewish delegation to its founding San Francisco Conference.

Given his poor relationship with the White House, Walsh anticipated that the administration might even support an opponent in a Democratic primary when he next ran for reelection. He faced no such challenge, but was defeated in his 1946 race for reelection by Henry Cabot Lodge Jr by a landslide.

== Personal life and death ==
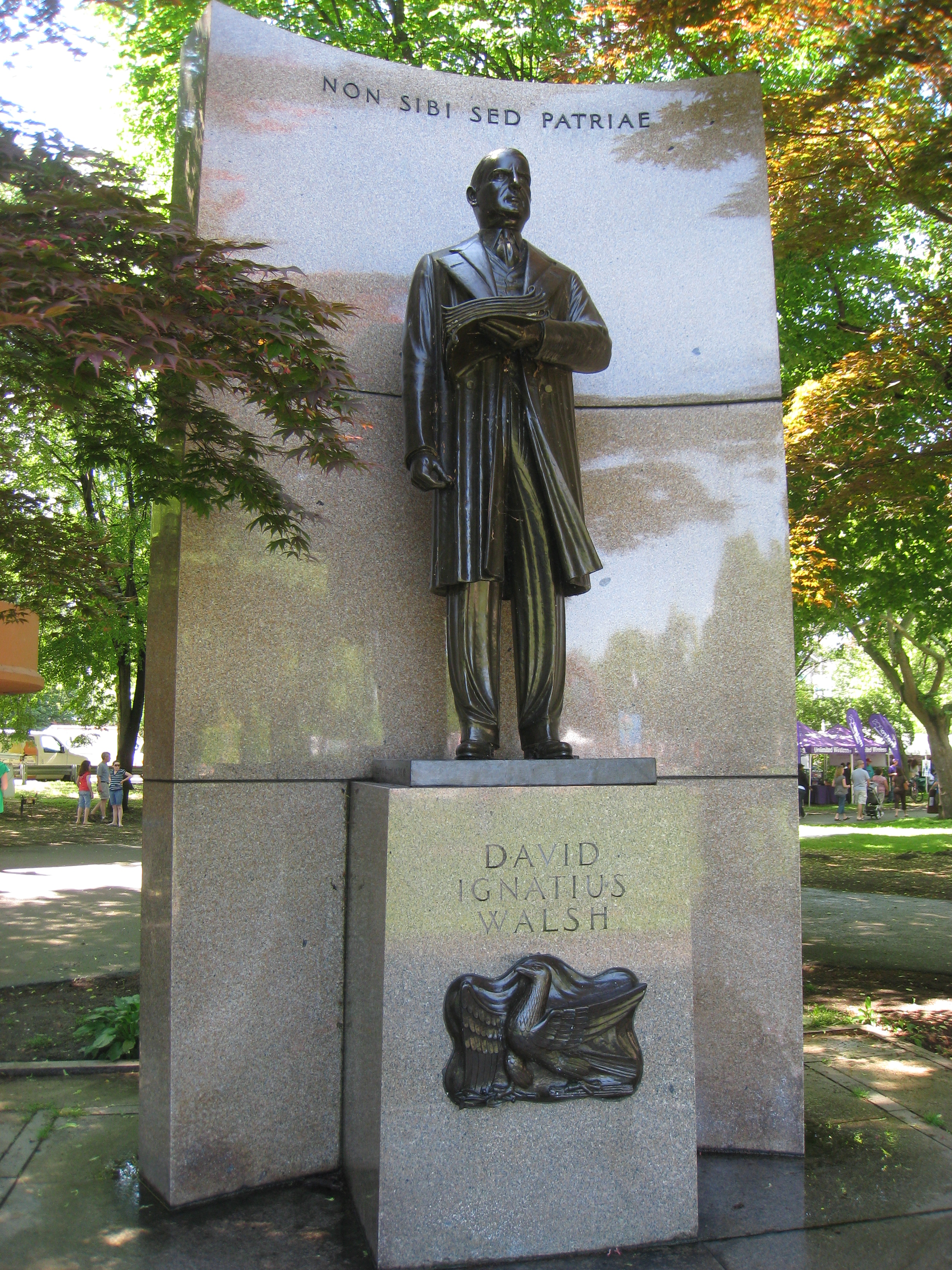
Memorial for Walsh in Boston

Walsh was raised a Roman Catholic and throughout his life identified himself as a Catholic and practiced his religion both in public and in private. An altar boy as a youth, in his adult years he regularly attended retreats and participated in meetings of Catholic laymen. Senate colleagues recognized his Catholic faith and occasionally baited him by challenging him to defend himself as a partisan of Catholic interests, which Walsh did not hesitate to answer. Once when a senator accused the Catholic Church of attempting to involve the United States in the Church's battle with the government of Mexico, Walsh defended the Church at length, saying in part:

I am unworthy to make any defense of the Roman Catholic Church but I want to remind every senator on this floor that everyone of them owes her an everlasting debt of gratitude. For fifteen centuries she alone held aloft the torch of Christianity in the world; she gave her blood to preserve it ... I speak in the name of the large, tolerant and superb non-Catholic citizenship of my state. I speak also in the name of the forty percent of soldiers and sailors in the last war who were Roman Catholics. I speak not less confidently in the name of the nearly twenty million Roman Catholics in these United States; and I say that the sons of my Church are loyal and true, on this issue, not less than every other, always and at all times loyal and devoted to our country, its institutions and its high aims and objects.

Walsh never married. He and his brother Thomas, who died in 1931, supported their four unmarried sisters, two of whom outlived the Senator. Some biographers and historians believe Walsh to have been homosexual. Writing in the 1960s, former Attorney General Francis Biddle hinted at the subject when he described Walsh in the mid-1930s as "an elderly politician with a soft tread and low, colorless voice ... whose concealed and controlled anxieties not altogether centered on retaining his job." According to Gore Vidal, interviewed in 1974, "There wasn't anybody in Massachusetts ... who didn't know what David Walsh was up to." Walsh's most recent biographer writes that "The campaign to destroy David I. Walsh worked because he could not defend himself ... David I. Walsh was gay."

He was a member of the Naval Order of the United States.

Upon his retirement from political office, Walsh resided in Clinton, Massachusetts, until his death following a cerebral hemorrhage in Boston on June 11, 1947. Walsh is buried in St. John's Cemetery in Clinton.

In his later years he received honorary degrees from Holy Cross, Georgetown University, Notre Dame, Fordham, Boston University, Canisius College, and St. Joseph's College (Philadelphia),

A bronze statue of him by Joseph Coletti was erected near the Music Oval on Boston's Charles River Esplanade in 1954. It bears the motto: "non sibi sed patriae", a tribute to his service to the U.S. Navy while in the Senate. Walsh's alma mater, Holy Cross, awards an annual scholarship in his name.

== See also ==
- List of political sex scandals in the United States

== Notes ==
Political offices
Preceded by Robert Luce	Lieutenant Governor of Massachusetts; 1913–1914	Succeeded by Edward P. Barry
Preceded by Eugene Foss	Governor of Massachusetts; 1914–1916	Succeeded by Samuel W. McCall
Preceded by Francis E. McGovern	Chair of the National Governors Association; 1914–1915	Succeeded by William Spry
Party political offices
Preceded by Thomas F. Cassidy	Democratic nominee for Lieutenant Governor of Massachusetts; 1911, 1912	Succeeded by Edward P. Barry
Preceded by Eugene Foss	Democratic nominee for Governor of Massachusetts; 1913, 1914, 1915	Succeeded by Frederick Mansfield
First	Democratic nominee for U.S. Senator from Massachusetts (Class 2); 1918, 1924	Succeeded by Marcus A. Coolidge
Preceded by William A. Gaston	Democratic nominee for U.S. Senator from Massachusetts (Class 1); 1926, 1928, 1934, 1940, 1946	Succeeded by John F. Kennedy
U.S. Senate
Preceded by John W. Weeks	United States Senator (Class 2) from Massachusetts; 1919–1925; Served alongside: Henry Cabot Lodge, William M. Butler	Succeeded by Frederick H. Gillett
Preceded by William M. Butler	United States Senator (Class 1) from Massachusetts; 1926–1947; Served alongside: Frederick H. Gillett, Marcus A. Coolidge, Henry Cabot Lodge Jr., Sinclair Weeks, Leverett Saltonstall	Succeeded by Henry Cabot Lodge Jr.
Preceded by Jesse H. Metcalf	Chair of the Senate Education Committee; 1933–1937	Succeeded by Hugo Black
Preceded by Park Trammell	Chair of the Senate Naval Affairs Committee; 1936–1947	Succeeded by John Chandler Gurney as Chair of the Senate Armed Services Committee
