= Benjamin Loring Young =

American politician (1885-1964)

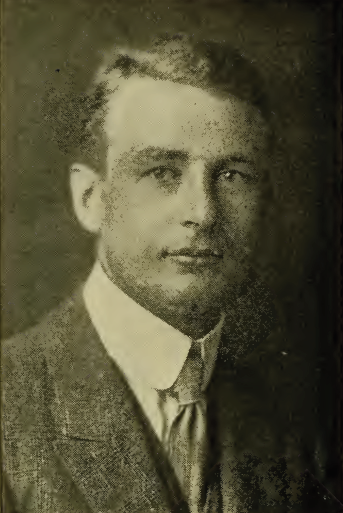

Speaker of the Massachusetts House of Representatives
- In office 1921–1924
- Preceded by: Joseph E. Warner
- Succeeded by: John C. Hull

Member of the Massachusetts House of Representatives 13th Middlesex District
- In office 1915–1924
- Preceded by: Immanuel Pfeiffer Jr.
- Succeeded by: Sidney J. Stone

Weston Selectman
- In office 1910–1946

Personal details
- Born: November 7, 1885 Weston, Massachusetts, U.S.
- Died: June 4, 1964 (aged 78) Boston, Massachusetts, U.S.
- Party: Republican
- Spouse: Mary Coolidge Hall
- Children: Barbara, Charlotte Hubbard, Lorraine, and Benjamin Loring
- Education: Harvard College, 1907; Harvard Law School, 1911
- Profession: Lawyer

Benjamin Loring Young (November 7, 1885 – June 4, 1964) of Weston, Massachusetts was a US lawyer and politician who served as the Speaker of the Massachusetts House of Representatives from 1921 to 1924.

Born in Weston in 1885, Young graduated from Harvard College in 1907 and Harvard Law School in 1911. Following nine years of legal practice, Young retired from the law. In 1910, Young was elected a Selectman of the Town of Weston, Massachusetts, a position he held for thirty-six years. Young was elected as a Republican to the Massachusetts House of Representatives in 1915, serving from 1916–24. Young served on the Ways and Means Committee in 1916, and as the chairman of the Recess Committee on State Finances in 1917. In 1928, Young ran unsuccessfully for US Senator. Young was on the Board of Parole and Advisory Board of Pardons for the State Prison and Massachusetts Reformatory from 1913 to 1915, and the chairman of the State Board of Probation from 1927–42, a US Referee in Bankruptcy from 1925–41, and a member of the Harvard Board of Overseers from 1922-28.

On June 26, 1933 Young was a delegate to, and the president of, the Massachusetts Convention that ratified the Twenty-first Amendment to the United States Constitution.

Young married Mary Coolidge Hall in 1908; they divorced in 1935. They had four children: Barbara, Charlotte, Lorraine, and Benjamin Loring Jr. He died in Boston on June 4, 1964.

== See also ==
- 1916 Massachusetts legislature
- 1917 Massachusetts legislature
- 1918 Massachusetts legislature
- 1919 Massachusetts legislature
- 1921–1922 Massachusetts legislature
- 1923–1924 Massachusetts legislature

Party political offices
Preceded by William M. Butler	Republican nominee for U.S. Senator from Massachusetts (Class 1); 1928	Succeeded by Robert M. Washburn
Massachusetts House of Representatives
Preceded by Immanuel Pfeiffer Jr.	Member of the Massachusetts House of Representatives; 13th Middlesex District; 1915 — 1924	Succeeded by Sidney J. Stone
Preceded by Joseph E. Warner	Speaker of the Massachusetts House of Representatives; 1921 — 1924	Succeeded by John C. Hull
