= Samuel McLeod =

Samuel McLeod (or variants) may refer to:

- Sammie McLeod (born 1999), English footballer
- Samuel D. McLeod (1867-1951), Canadian-American police officer and politician
- Sammy McLeod (1934-1973), Scottish footballer

== See also ==
- Alexander Samuel MacLeod, Canadian-born American painter
