= Harold Tompkins =

American politician (1887-1954)

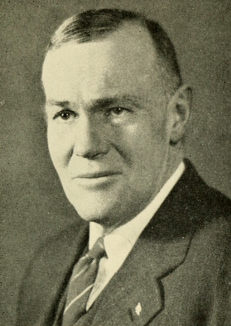

Member of the Massachusetts House of Representatives for the 13th Middlesex District
- In office 1953–1954
- Preceded by: David B. Williams
- Succeeded by: John Marshall Eaton Jr.
- In office 1943–1949
- Preceded by: Otis M. Whitney
- Succeeded by: David B. Williams

Personal details
- Born: August 23, 1887 Adamsville, Rhode Island
- Died: May 25, 1954 (aged 66) Concord, Massachusetts
- Resting place: Sleepy Hollow Cemetery; Concord, Massachusetts
- Party: Republican
- Occupation: Poultry farmer

Harold Tompkins was an American politician who was a member of the Massachusetts House of Representatives from 1943 to 1949 and again from 1953 to 1954.

== Early life ==
Tompkins was born on August 23, 1887, in Adamsville, Rhode Island. He grew up in Concord, Massachusetts, and attended public school there.

Outside of politics, Tompkins was an award-winning poultry farmer who bred Rhode Island Reds.

== Political career ==
Tompkins was a member of the Concord school committee for 21 years. From 1940 to 1947 he was chairman of the board. In 1942 he was elected to the Massachusetts House of Representatives. He did not run for reelection in 1950 and was succeeded by David B. Williams. In 1953, Williams was appointed to the Massachusetts Governor's Council and Tompkins won the special election to succeed him. Tompkins did not finish the term, as he died suddenly on May 25, 1954, at his home in Concord.

== See also ==
- Massachusetts legislature: 1943–1944, 1945–1946, 1947–1948, 1949–1950
