= General Whitney (disambiguation) =

Courtney Whitney (1897–1969) was a U.S. Army major general. General Whitney may also refer to:

- Henry Howard Whitney (1866–1949), U.S. Army brigadier general
- Otis M. Whitney (1909–1982), Massachusetts National Guard major general
- Steven P. Whitney (born c. 1970), U.S. Space Force brigadier general
