= WJFD-FM =

Portuguese-language radio station in New Bedford, Massachusetts

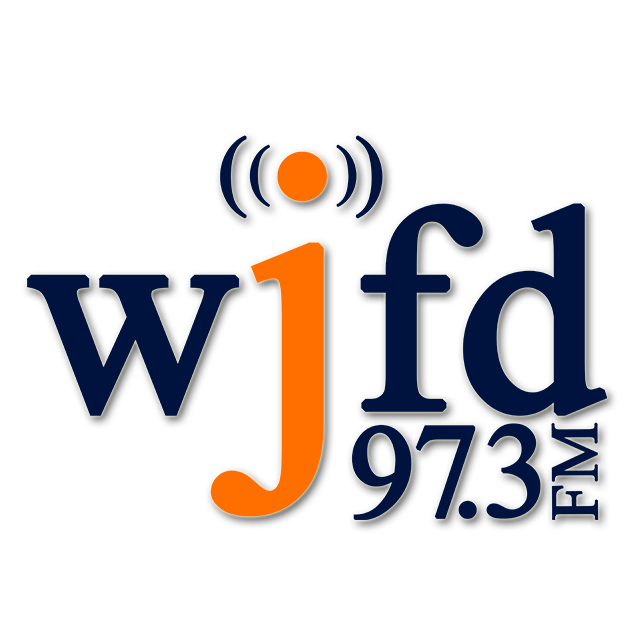
- New Bedford, Massachusetts; United States
- Broadcast area: South Coast Massachusetts; Providence, Rhode Island
- Frequency: 97.3 MHz
- Branding: 97.3 FM WJFD

Programming
- Format: Portuguese and world music

Ownership
- Owner: WJFD-FM, Inc.

History
- First air date: February 22, 1949 (as WBSM-FM)
- Former call signs: WBSM-FM (1949–1970); WGCY (1970–1975)
- Call sign meaning: Jacinto F. Diniz

Technical information
- Licensing authority: FCC
- Facility ID: 18720
- Class: B
- ERP: 50,000 watts
- HAAT: 152 meters (499 ft)
- Transmitter coordinates: 41°38′15.2″N 70°52′14.8″W

Links
- Public license information: Public file; LMS
- Webcast: Listen live
- Website: www.wjfd.com

WJFD-FM (97.3 MHz) is a commercial radio station licensed to New Bedford, Massachusetts. The station is owned by Henry M. Arruda with the license held by WJFD-FM, Inc. Studio and offices are on Orchard Street in New Bedford. The transmitter is located off Arcene Street in Fairhaven. WJFD-FM airs a Portuguese language music format. It is aimed at the Portuguese, Brazilian and Cape Verdean communities in Southeastern New England.

== History ==
On February 22, 1949, the station signed on as WBSM-FM. It was the FM counterpart to WBSM (1230 AM; now on 1420 AM). WBSM-AM-FM were owned by the Bay State Broadcasting Company. At first, WBSM-FM simulcast its AM sister station, but with a large Portuguese-speaking population in the region, many of whom came to Coastal New England to work in the fishing industry, management decided to devote WBSM-FM to Portuguese programming.

On September 16, 1970, the callsign switched to WGCY. It was owned by Gray Communications, and continued its Portuguese pop music and talk. In 1975, local prosecutor and political leader Edmund Dinis, born in the Azores and of Portuguese descent, acquired the station.

The station was assigned the WJFD-FM call sign by the Federal Communications Commission on June 23, 1975. Edmund Dinis wanted to honor his father, Jacinto F. Diniz, by using his initials in the new call sign. (The father used a Z at the end of the family name, while Edmund used an S.)

Edmund Dinis owned the station until his death on March 14, 2010, at age 85. On August 2, 2010, ownership of the station was transferred to Dinis' close friend and business partner, Henry M. Arruda. The station moved its studios and offices from an historical downtown location on Union Street, to the third floor of the Howland Place professional building in the south end of New Bedford shortly after.

In 2015, WJFD-FM joined the iHeartRadio platform of streaming radio stations, becoming the first and only Portuguese language radio station in the U.S. to be offered. Over time, immigration from Portugal has dropped off, so many of WJFD-FM's newer listeners are of Portuguese-Brazilian-Cape Verdean-descent and non-Portuguese listeners. From 2018-2019, and in 2023-2024, the station has also provided a live broadcast of the Eurovision Song Contest final, with commentary in English and Portuguese.
