= 1947–1948 Massachusetts legislature =

155th Massachusetts General Court
| ← | 154th | 156th | → |

Overview
- Legislative body: General Court
- Election: November 5, 1946

Senate
- Members: 40
- President: Donald W. Nicholson, Harris S. Richardson
- Party control: Republican

House
- Members: 240
- Speaker: Frederick Willis (10th Essex)
- Party control: Republican

Sessions
- 1st: January 1, 1947 – July 1, 1947
- 2nd: January 7, 1948 – June 19, 1948

The 155th Massachusetts General Court, consisting of the Massachusetts Senate and the Massachusetts House of Representatives, met from January 1, 1947, to June 18, 1948, during the governorship of Robert F. Bradford, in Boston.

== State Senate ==
=== Districts ===
As established by Chapter 507 of the Acts of 1939. The state census of 1935 was the basis of the apportionment.

- Berkshire District: Adams, Becket, Cheshire, Clarksburg, Dalton, Florida, Hancock, Hinsdale, Lanesborough, Lenox, New Ashford, North Adams, Peru, Pittsfield, Richmond, Savoy, Stockbridge, Washington, West Stockbridge, Williamstown, Windsor
- First Bristol District: Acushnet, Attleboro, Berkley, Dighton, Easton, Freetown, Mansfield, North Attleboro, Norton, Plainville, Raynham, Rehoboth, Seekonk, Swansea, Taunton
- Second Bristol District: Fall River, Somerset
- Third Bristol District: Dartmouth, Fairhaven, New Bedford, Westport
- Cape and Plymouth District: Barnstable, Bourne, Brewster, Carver, Chatham, Chilmark, Dennis, Duxbury, Eastham, Edgartown, Falmouth, Gay Head, Gosnold, Halifax, Hanson, Harwich, Kingston, Marion, Mashpee, Mattapoisett, Nantucket, Oak Bluffs, Orleans, Pembroke, Plymouth, Plympton, Provincetown, Rochester, Sandwich, Tisbury, Truro, Wareham, Wellfleet, West Tisbury, Whitman, Yarmouth
- First Essex District: Lynn, Nahant, Swampscott
- Second Essex District: Beverly, Danvers, Marblehead, Salem
- Third Essex District: Essex, Gloucester, Hamilton, Ipswich, Lynnfield, Manchester, Middleton, Newbury, Newburyport, Peabody, Rockport, Rowley, Saugus, Topsfield, Wenham
- Fourth Essex District: Amesbury, Andover, Boxford, Georgetown, Groveland, Haverhill, Merrimac, North Andover, North Reading, Salisbury, West Newbury
- Fifth Essex District: Lawrence, Methuen
- Franklin and Hampshire District: Amherst, Ashfield, Bernardston, Belchertown, Buckland, Charlemont, Chesterfield, Colrain, Conway, Cummington, Deerfield, Easthampton, Enfield*, Erving, Gill, Goshen, Granby, Greenfield, Greenwich*, Hadley, Hatfield, Hawley, Heath, Huntington, Leverett, Leyden, Ludlow, Middlefield, Monroe, Montague, New Salem, Northfield, Orange, Pelham, Prescott*, Rowe, Shelburne, Shutesbury, South Hadley, Sunderland, Ware, Warwick, Wendell, Whately, Williamsburg, Worthington
- First Hampden District: Longmedaow, Springfield Wards 2, 4, 5, 6, 7, 8
- Second Hampden District: Chicopee, Holyoke, Springfield Ward 1
- Hampden, Hampshire and Berkshire District: Agawam, Alford, Blandford, Chester, Egremont, Granville, Great Barrington, Lee, Monterey, Montgomery, Mount Washington, New Marlborough, Otis, Russell, Sandisfield, Sheffield, Southwick, Springfield Ward 3, Tollan, Tyringham, Westfield, West Springfield
- First Middlesex District: Ashby, Ayer, Carlisle, Chelmsford, Dracut, Dunstable, Groton, Littleton Wards 2, 3, 4, 5, 6, 7, 8, Lowell Ward 11, Pepperell, Shirley, Townsend, Tyngsborough, Westford
- Second Middlesex District: Belmont, Cambridge Wards 4, 6, 7, 8, 9, 10, 11, Somerville Wards 6, 7
- Third Middlesex District: Cambridge Ward 3, Malden Ward 3, Medford Wards 1, 5, 7, Somerville Wards 1, 2, 3, 4, 5

(*)Terminated. See Acts of 1927, chapter 321; Acts of 1938, chapter 240 and 455.

=== Senators ===
| District | | Portrait | Senator | Date of birth | Party | Hometown | Notes |
|---|---|---|---|---|---|---|---|
| Berkshire | | | Michael H. Condron | | Democratic | Pittsfield | |
| Bristol | First | | Willard A. Ormsbee | | Republican | Raynham | Chairman, Aeronautics; chairman, Mercantile Affairs |
| Bristol | Second | | William Emmet White | June 1, 1900 | Democratic | Fall River | |
| Bristol | Third | | Edward C. Peirce | March 7, 1895 | Democratic | New Bedford | |
| Cape and Plymouth | | | Donald W. Nicholson | August 11, 1888 | Republican | Wareham | President of the Senate; chairman, Rules |
| Essex | First | | Charles V. Hogan | April 12, 1897 | Democratic | Lynn | |
| Essex | Second | | J. Elmer Callahan | | Republican | Salem | Chairman, Constitutional Law |
| Essex | Third | | Cornelius F. Haley | July 15, 1875 | Republican | Rowley | Chairman, State Administration |
| Essex | Fourth | | Philip K. Allen | January 3, 1910 | Republican | Andover | Chairman, Agriculture |
| Essex | Fifth | | Michael A. Flanagan | February 21, 1890 | Democratic | Lawrence | |
| Franklin and Hampshire | | | Ralph Collins Mahar | January 4, 1912 | Republican | Orange | Chairman, Education; chairman, Public Health |
| Hampden | First | | Ralph Vester Clampit | March 28, 1896 | Republican | Springfield | Chairman, Military Affairs and Public Safety |
| Hampden | Second | | William E. Nolen | | Democratic | Holyoke | |
| Hampden, Hampshire and Berkshire | | | Ralph Lerche | August 19, 1899 | Republican | Northampton | Chairman, Cities; chairman, Water Supply |
| Middlesex | First | | William C. Geary | | Democratic | Lowell | |
| Middlesex | Second | | Edward Rowe (politician) | March 17, 1902 | Republican | Cambridge | Chairman, Legal Affairs; chairman, Taxation |
| Middlesex | Third | | Burton F. Faulkner | | Democratic | Somerville | |
| Middlesex | Fourth | | Sumner G. Whittier | July 4, 1911 | Republican | Everett | Chairman, Civil Service; chairman, Departmental Rules and Regulations |
| Middlesex | Fifth | | Richard I. Furbush | January 4, 1904 | Republican | Waltham | Chairman, Conservation; chairman, Power and Light |
| Middlesex | Sixth | | Harris S. Richardson | January 10, 1887 | Republican | Winchester | Chairman, Ways and Means |
| Middlesex | Seventh | | George Jelly Evans | February 4, 1909 | Republican | Wakefield | Chairman, Labor and Industries; chairman, Pensions |
| Middlesex and Norfolk | | | Charles William Olson | August 24, 1889 | Republican | Ashland | Chairman, Public Lands; chairman, Public Welfare |
| Middlesex and Suffolk | | | Richard Henry Lee | December 20, 1901 | Republican | Newton | Chairman, Public Service |
| Norfolk | First | | John D. Mackay | April 7, 1872 | Republican | Quincy | Chairman, Judiciary |
| Norfolk | Second | | Mason Sears | December 29, 1899 | Republican | Dedham | Chairman, Election Laws |
| Norfolk and Plymouth | | | Newland H. Holmes | August 30, 1891 | Republican | Weymouth | Chairman, Bills in the Third Reading; chairman, Counties |
| Norfolk and Suffolk | | | Philip Griggs Bowker | April 17, 1899 | Republican | Brookline | Chairman, Metropolitan Affairs |
| Plymouth | | | Charles Gardner Miles | December 2, 1879 | Republican | Brockton | Chairman, Engrossed Bills; chairman, Municipal Finance |
| Suffolk | First | | Joseph A. Melley | March 1, 1902 | Democratic | Chelsea | |
| Suffolk | Second | | Michael LoPresti | June 25, 1908 | Democratic | Boston | |
| Suffolk | Third | | Charles John Innes | June 1, 1901 | Republican | Boston | Chairman, Insurance |
| Suffolk | Fourth | | John E. Powers | November 10, 1910 | Democratic | Boston | |
| Suffolk | Fifth | | Chester A. Dolan Jr. | September 20, 1907 | Democratic | Boston | Minority Floor Leader |
| Suffolk | Sixth | | Charles I. Taylor | November 25, 1899 | Democratic | Boston | |
| Suffolk | Seventh | | Joseph L. Murphy | January 25, 1907 | Democratic | Boston | |
| Worcester | First | | William Daniel Fleming | April 14, 1907 | Democratic | Worcester | |
| Worcester | Second | | Harry P. McAllister | April 25, 1880 | Republican | Worcester | Chairman, Banks and Banking |
| Worcester | Third | | George W. Stanton | | Democratic | Fitchburg | |
| Worcester | Fourth | | Joseph Simon Virostek | | Republican | Douglas | Chairman, Towns; chairman, Transportation |
| Worcester and Hampden | | | Edward William Staves | May 9, 1887 | Republican | Southbridge | Chairman, Highways and Motor Vehicles |

=== Employees ===
- Irving N. Hayden, Clerk of the Senate
- Thomas A. Chadwick, Assistant Clerk of the Senate
- William F. Dillon, Clerical Assistant to Clerk of the Senate
- Frederick May Elliot, Chaplain of the Senate
- William F. Furbush, Secretary to the President of the Senate and Clerk of the Senate Committee on Rules
- Fernald Hutchins, Counsel to the Senate
- Thomas R. Bateman, Assistant Counsel to the Senate
- Royal B. Patriquin, Assistant to Counsel of the Senate

== Representatives ==
| portrait | name | date of birth | district |
|---|---|---|---|
| | Frank Haskell Allen | October 12, 1877 | 7th Worcester |
| | Richard James Allen | June 22, 1909 | |
| | Horace Thurber Aplington | | |
| | John A. Armstrong | June 12, 1901 | |
| | Charles J. Artesani | | |
| | Edward C. Ashworth | April 22, 1899 | |
| | John George Asiaf | June 30, 1900 | |
| | Joseph A. Aspero | | |
| | Samuel Greenleaf Atkinson | | |
| | Josiah Babcock Jr. | May 21, 1880 | |
| | Everett Breed Bacheller | August 24, 1895 | |
| | Earle S. Bagley | January 20, 1905 | |
| | William B. Bailey | December 11, 1892 | |
| | Laurence H. Banks | | |
| | Cyrus Barnes | August 23, 1889 | |
| | George L. Barrus | December 15, 1880 | |
| | Michael J. Batal | September 8, 1898 | |
| | Norman S. Baxter | | |
| | Raymond H. Beach | August 11, 1888 | |
| | William Berthiaume | | |
| | G. Leo Bessette | September 23, 1906 | |
| | Rodolphe G. Bessette | September 14, 1911 | |
| | Fred Arthur Blake | January 13, 1895 | |
| | Frank Edwin Boot | November 8, 1905 | |
| | Stanley John Borsa | | |
| | Gerald Timothy Bowler | | |
| | Gordon Dickson Boynton | August 9, 1901 | |
| | Jeremiah Francis Brennan | | |
| | Daniel Joseph Bresnahan | September 30, 1888 | |
| | Clarence B. Brown | December 22, 1877 | |
| | Frank Eben Brown | January 14, 1890 | |
| | John D. Brown | January 30, 1900 | |
| | Archie Edward Bruce | August 20, 1883 | |
| | James A. Burke (Massachusetts politician) | March 30, 1910 | |
| | Harland Burke | April 22, 1888 | |
| | Philip Courtland Burr | | |
| | Fannie Buzzell | March 31, 1914 | |
| | Oscar Josiah Cahoon | April 29, 1912 | |
| | Colin James Cameron | August 24, 1879 | |
| | Robert Patterson Campbell | December 20, 1887 | |
| | Matthew J. Capeless | June 4, 1875 | |
| | Enrico Cappucci | 1910 | |
| | Ernest Westervelt Carman | | |
| | Arthur B. Carney Jr. | | |
| | John Henry Carroll | | |
| | William J. Casey (Massachusetts politician) | June 27, 1905 | |
| | Daniel Casey | May 7, 1890 | |
| | Francis X. Casey | | |
| | Harrison Chadwick | February 25, 1903 | |
| | Wendell Phillips Chamberlain | October 28, 1911 | |
| | Philip Aloysius Chapman | | |
| | William G. Clark Jr. | May 6, 1912 | |
| | David M. Cleary | May 9, 1901 | |
| | Thomas Francis Coady | 1878 | |
| | John F. Collins | July 20, 1919 | 11th Suffolk |
| | Dana S. Collins | | |
| | J. Everett Collins | April 27, 1894 | |
| | James Francis Condon | February 4, 1899 | |
| | Joseph T. Conley | | |
| | Robert Gerard Connolly | September 11, 1916 | |
| | Michael John Conway | | |
| | Leo Joseph Cournoyer | December 11, 1905 | |
| | George Chauncey Cousens | September 20, 1905 | |
| | William A. Cowing | January 6, 1878 | |
| | Earl Gustavus Crockett | March 23, 1894 | |
| | Patrick Francis Cronin | | |
| | Jeremiah Dickson Crowley | May 16, 1911 | |
| | Walter A. Cuffe | January 29, 1898 | |
| | John G. Curley | | |
| | Leslie Bradley Cutler | March 24, 1890 | |
| | Lawrence Harvard Davis | | |
| | George Walter Dean | | |
| | Ernest DeRoy | July 13, 1889 | |
| | Cornelius Desmond | October 4, 1893 | |
| | Burt Dewar | December 29, 1884 | |
| | Logan Rockwell Dickie | May 4, 1890 | |
| | Vincent B. Dignam | February 22, 1896 | |
| | Jacinto F. Diniz | October 3, 1888 | |
| | Edmond J. Donlan | December 19, 1899 | |
| | Anthony R. Doyle | August 8, 1895 | |
| | Charles D. Driscoll | June 18, 1888 | |
| | Howard Bernard Driscoll | | |
| | Joseph Edward Duffy | September 25, 1912 | |
| | Henry M. Duggan | October 5, 1896 | |
| | Ernest W. Dullea | January 14, 1891 | |
| | Henry Allen Ellis | November 5, 1879 | |
| | Thomas Edward Enright | August 1, 1881 | |
| | Andrew E. Faulkner | September 23, 1913 | |
| | Michael Paul Feeney | March 26, 1907 | |
| | Charles E. Ferguson | January 30, 1894 | |
| | Maurice Edward Fitzgerald | | |
| | Peter F. Fitzgerald | February 16, 1889 | |
| | William J. Fitzsimons | | |
| | Norman Eugene Folsom | December 23, 1903 | |
| | John F. Foster | | |
| | Stephen L. French | March 9, 1892 | |
| | George Fuller | July 24, 1893 | |
| | John L. Gallant | | |
| | Charles Gibbons | July 21, 1901 | |
| | Frank S. Giles | June 15, 1915 | |
| | Avery W. Gilkerson | June 5, 1899 | |
| | Hollis M. Gott | May 25, 1885 | |
| | Thomas T. Gray | July 22, 1892 | |
| | George Greene | March 7, 1897 | 12th Suffolk |
| | Francis G. Gregory | | |
| | Frederick C. Haigis | May 10, 1903 | |
| | Jacob Hakala | | |
| | James Edward Hannon | | |
| | Francis Appleton Harding | 1908 | |
| | Fred C. Harrington | April 21, 1902 | |
| | William E. Hays | November 28, 1903 | |
| | Charles W. Hedges | March 27, 1901 | |
| | James Alan Hodder | | |
| | Charles F. Holman | June 21, 1892 | |
| | J. Philip Howard | February 16, 1907 | |
| | Richard Lester Hull | November 30, 1917 | |
| | Nathaniel M. Hurwitz | March 24, 1893 | |
| | Fred A. Hutchinson | April 5, 1881 | |
| | C. Vernon Inett | | |
| | William Whittem Jenness | April 3, 1904 | |
| | Adolph Johnson | July 20, 1885 | |
| | Ernest A. Johnson | March 13, 1897 | |
| | Stanley Everett Johnson | October 4, 1911 | |
| | Peter John Jordan | July 23, 1910 | |
| | Jeremiah Kamens | | |
| | Charles Kaplan | September 26, 1895 | |
| | Clarence Karelitz | | |
| | Warren Charles Karner | | |
| | Alfred B. Keith | November 26, 1893 | |
| | Francis Joseph Kelley | March 21, 1890 | |
| | Richard A. Kelly | August 7, 1905 | |
| | Thomas E. Key | | |
| | Allan Roy Kingston | November 23, 1901 | |
| | Fred I. Lamson | December 11, 1910 | |
| | George Thomas Lanigan | January 4, 1909 | |
| | Laurence W. Law | | |
| | Francis W. Lindstrom | December 18, 1898 | |
| | Louis Lobel | August 10, 1911 | |
| | C. Edwin Lofgren | | |
| | Gerald P. Lombard | January 4, 1916 | |
| | Raymond Joseph Lord | | |
| | Burton Elmer Loring | | |
| | C. Gerald Lucey | September 8, 1913 | |
| | Arthur Ulton Mahan | June 18, 1900 | |
| | Vincent Ambrose Mannering | July 11, 1912 | 10th Suffolk |
| | George Edward Marchand | December 22, 1877 | |
| | William Markland | | |
| | Philip M. Markley | March 28, 1897 | |
| | George Francis Martin Jr. | | |
| | Francis V. Matera | | |
| | Michael J. McCarthy (politician) | October 23, 1890 | |
| | Frank D. McCarthy | | |
| | Paul Andrew McCarthy | December 23, 1902 | |
| | Elmer L. McCulloch | | |
| | Samuel D. McLeod | | |
| | Joseph A. Milano | April 8, 1883 | |
| | Sherman Miles | December 5, 1882 | |
| | Hugh Morton | | |
| | Edward J. Mulligan | February 8, 1907 | |
| | Robert F. Murphy (politician) | January 24, 1899 | |
| | George Bernard Murphy Jr. | | |
| | Cornelius Joseph Murray | August 19, 1890 | |
| | Harold Clinton Nagle | July 27, 1917 | |
| | Louis K. Nathanson | 12th Suffolk | |
| | George Burkman Norton | | |
| | James Anthony O'Brien | October 27, 1886 | |
| | William Thomas O'Brien | December 2, 1889 | |
| | John Henry O'Connor Jr. | December 9, 1917 | |
| | Louis F. O'Keefe | June 12, 1895 | |
| | Tip O'Neill | December 9, 1912 | |
| | Frank B. Oliveira | | |
| | Harold A. Palmer | October 15, 1906 | |
| | Raymond P. Palmer | December 27, 1895 | |
| | Anthony Parenzo | | |
| | Eben Parsons | | |
| | Clark Brownson Partridge | August 26, 1878 | |
| | Henry W. Pickford | | |
| | Gabriel Piemonte | January 28, 1909 | |
| | Frederick Everett Pierce | May 5, 1862 | 2nd Franklin |
| | George William Porter | November 6, 1885 | |
| | Harvey Armand Pothier | September 6, 1901 | |
| | George E. Rawson | December 6, 1886 | |
| | Thomas Francis Reilly | August 12, 1903 | |
| | Hibbard Richter | April 12, 1899 | |
| | Hallam Taylor Ring | | |
| | Joseph D. Rivest | | |
| | Joseph N. Roach | March 22, 1883 | |
| | Albert E. Roberts | November 22, 1875 | |
| | William H. J. Rowan | June 21, 1879 | |
| | Daniel Rudsten | | |
| | Kendall Ainsworth Sanderson | | |
| | Thomas Aloysius Scanlan | | |
| | Raymond William Schlapp | | |
| | William Henry Sears Jr. | July 14, 1875 | |
| | A. John Serino | March 13, 1906 | |
| | Henry Lee Shattuck | October 12, 1879 | |
| | John M. Shea | December 8, 1902 | |
| | Arthur Joseph Sheehan | March 16, 1897 | |
| | Robert T. Sisson | February 21, 1881 | |
| | Michael F. Skerry | January 3, 1909 | |
| | Charles J. Skladzien | | |
| | Roy C. Smith | January 28, 1890 | |
| | H. Edward Snow | April 25, 1914 | |
| | Margaret Spear | August 10, 1882 | |
| | George Ward Stetson | May 31, 1902 | |
| | Daniel Francis Sullivan | February 15, 1904 | |
| | Jeremiah Joseph Sullivan | March 9, 1905 | |
| | Patrick Gilbert Sullivan | November 18, 1904 | |
| | Paul A. Sullivan | | |
| | Ralph Warren Sullivan | | |
| | Joseph A. Sylvia Jr. | September 16, 1903 | |
| | Edmond Talbot Jr. | June 1, 1898 | |
| | Clarence F. Telford | | |
| | Nathaniel Tilden | November 3, 1903 | |
| | Harold Edward Tivey | | |
| | Harold Tompkins | August 23, 1887 | |
| | John Joseph Toomey | March 25, 1909 | |
| | Talbot T. Tweedy | | |
| | James Joseph Twohig Jr. | May 2, 1908 | |
| | Earle Stanley Tyler | December 18, 1896 | |
| | Theodore Jack Vaitses | May 8, 1901 | |
| | John H. Valentine | July 21, 1896 | |
| | John W. Vaughan | March 20, 1878 | |
| | James T. Violette | | |
| | William X. Wall | July 1, 1904 | |
| | Joseph Francis Walsh | February 9, 1907 | |
| | John Cummings Webster Jr. | | |
| | Norman F. Wellen | | |
| | John B. Wenzler | June 11, 1881 | |
| | Malcolm Stuart White | | |
| | Howard J. Whitmore Jr. | May 9, 1905 | |
| | John S. Whittemore | | |
| | Frederick Willis (American politician) | May 18, 1904 | |
| | Henry D. Winslow | September 24, 1910 | |
| | Stanislaus George Wondolowski | August 20, 1909 | |
| | Albert E. Wood | | |
| | Clarence A. Wood | | |
| | Lawrence Theodore Woolfenden | | |
| | Arthur Eaton Young | | |
| | Arthur Lincoln Youngman | | |

== See also ==
- 1948 Massachusetts gubernatorial election
- 80th United States Congress
- List of Massachusetts General Courts
