= George Rogers (Massachusetts politician) =

American politician (1933–2018)

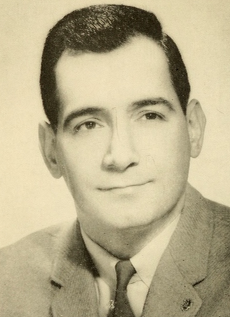
- George Rogers in 1967

Member of the Massachusetts House of Representatives from the 12th Bristol District
- In office 1999–2003
- Preceded by: Joseph McIntyre
- Succeeded by: Mark A. Howland

Member of the Massachusetts Senate from the Bristol and Plymouth District
- In office 1975–1978
- Preceded by: John F. Parker
- Succeeded by: Robert M. Hunt

Mayor of New Bedford, Massachusetts
- In office 1970–1971
- Preceded by: Edward F. Harrington
- Succeeded by: John A. Markey

Member of the Massachusetts House of Representatives from the 2nd Bristol District
- In office 1969–1970

Member of the Massachusetts House of Representatives from the 7th Bristol District
- In office 1965–1969

Personal details
- Born: August 2, 1933 New Bedford, Massachusetts
- Died: June 30, 2018 (aged 84) New Bedford, Massachusetts
- Party: Democratic
- Education: Providence College
- Occupation: Teacher; Politician

George Rogers (August 2, 1933 – June 30, 2018) was an American politician who served as a member of the Massachusetts General Court and as Mayor of New Bedford, Massachusetts.

== Early career ==
Born and raised in New Bedford, Rogers graduated from Providence College in 1958 and later taught at Fairhaven High School and Greater New Bedford Regional Vocational-Technical High School. He began his career in elected office as a member of the Massachusetts House of Representatives, where he served from 1965 to 1970. In 1969, he was elected Mayor of New Bedford. In 1971, Rogers lost his reelection campaign to John A. Markey.

== Return to the General Court ==
In 1974, Rogers returned to New Bedford politics as a councilor-at-large. Later that year, he was also elected to the Massachusetts Senate. In 1978, Rogers was convicted of conspiracy to commit bribery and was sentenced to two years in prison and fined $5,000.

In 1980, Rogers was once again elected Councilor-at-Large, a position he held until 2003. From 1999 to 2003, he simultaneously held seats on the New Bedford City Council and in the Massachusetts House of Representatives. Rogers was defeated in the 2002 Democratic primary by Freetown, Massachusetts Selectman Mark A. Howland. Rogers's defeat came months after he was accused of showing pornography to a minor; he was eventually found not guilty.

== Later career ==
Rogers lost re-election to the New Beford City Council in 2003. He ran for the Democratic nomination for his old House seat in 2004, finishing third behind Stephen Canessa and Mark A. Howland. In 2015, he ran unsuccessfully for a seat on the New Bedford School Committee. Rogers died in 2018 at age 84.
