= Edward C. Peirce =

American politician

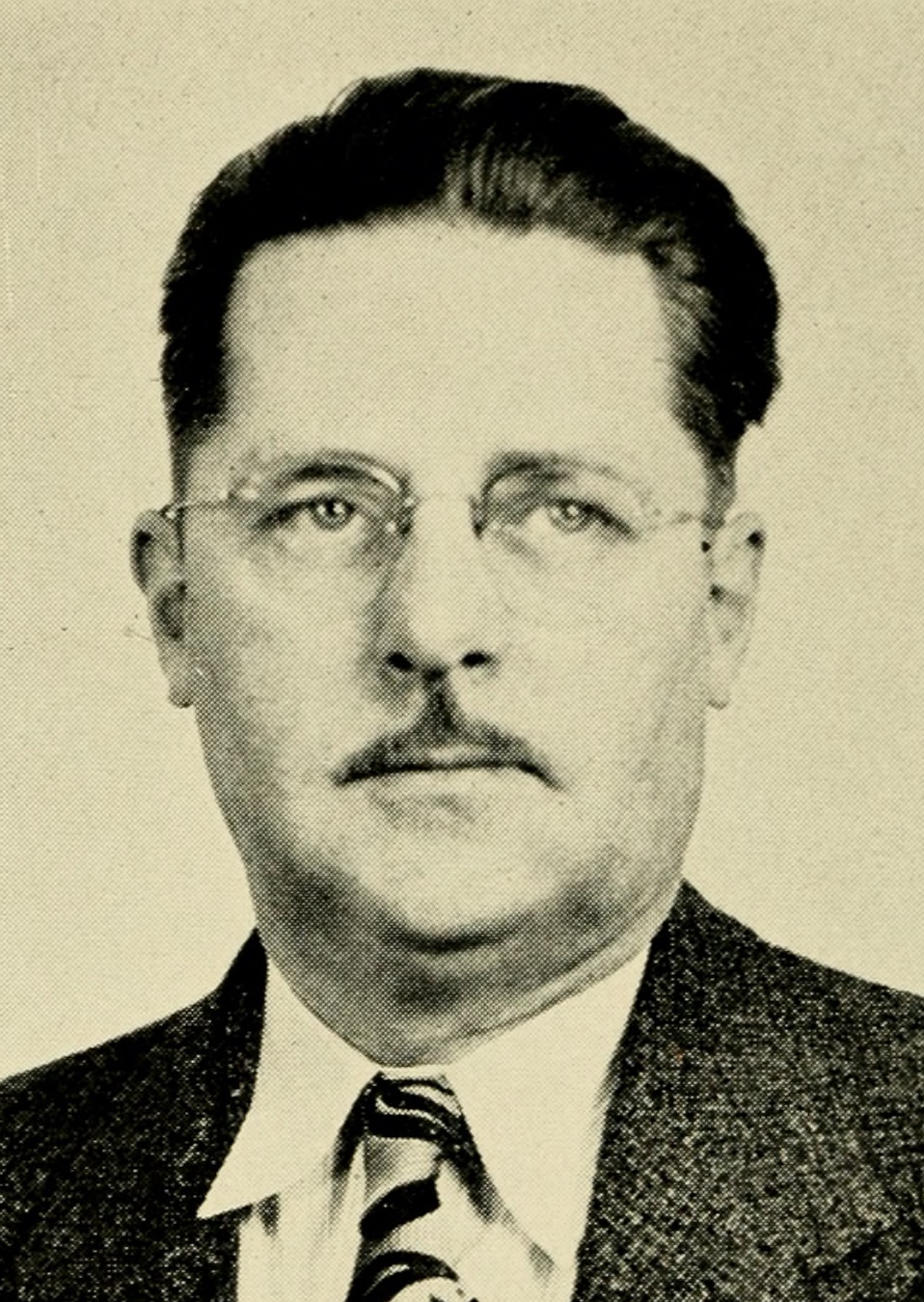
- Portrait of Edward C. Peirce

Mayor of New Bedford, Massachusetts
- In office 1952–1953
- Preceded by: Arthur N. Harriman
- Succeeded by: Arthur N. Harriman

Member of the Massachusetts Senate from the 3rd Bristol District
- In office 1945–1953
- Preceded by: Joseph F. Francis
- Succeeded by: Edmund Dinis

Personal details
- Born: March 7, 1895 New Bedford, Massachusetts
- Died: January 31, 1955 (aged 59) New Bedford, Massachusetts
- Party: Democratic
- Occupation: Cotton broker Florist

Edward C. Peirce (March 7, 1895 – January 31, 1955) was an American politician who served as Mayor of New Bedford, Massachusetts, and as a member of the Massachusetts Senate.

== Early life ==
Peirce was born on March 7, 1895, in New Bedford, Massachusetts. He started his business career at the age of 15 as an office boy. In 1924 he formed Peirce & Winsper, a successful cotton brokerage firm. The cotton market boomed and Peirce became a millionaire by the age of 30. However, the market quickly turned and the firm's liabilities vastly outweighed its assets. On May 20, 1925, he was arrested on a charge of larceny for not delivering 150 bales of cotton for which he had been paid $21,000. He was charged with 39 other counts of larceny, but was acquitted. By 1936, Peirce was on the relief rolls of the Works Progress Administration. He later worked as a florist and lived in an apartment above his shop.

== Political career ==
After several unsuccessful runs for political office, Peirce was elected to the Massachusetts Senate in 1944. In 1947, he ran in the special election to fill the 9th congressional district seat following the death of Charles L. Gifford. He was upset in the Democratic primary by State Representative Jacinto F. Diniz.

In 1951, Peirce defeated nine year incumbent Arthur N. Harriman to become Mayor of New Bedford. During his tenure as Mayor, Peirce ordered a gambling raid that resulted in the arrest of 33 men and offered his office at city hall as a residence for stray dogs in order to save money on a contract with the Animal Rescue League and protest the organization's acquisition of an electrocution box to euthanize dogs.

On November 25, 1952, Peirce, city council president Leonard T. Healy, two police detectives, and two others were indicted for conspiracy in connection with gambling. On May 21, 1953, Peirce was found guilty of conspiring to impede enforcement of gambling laws. On May 25, he was found guilty on a second indictment. The remaining four indictments were held in abeyance. Following his conviction, Perice maintained his innocence and vowed to run the city from his jail cell. He was sentenced to four years in jail. On July 3, Governor Christian Herter signed legislation to allow the New Bedford City Council to appoint one of its members to run the city as acting mayor while Peirce was in prison. On July 7, Francis J. Lawler was elected temporary Mayor. While in jail, Peirce ran for reelection with the assistance of his daughter. He finished fifth in the seven candidate race.

On January 26, 1955, Peirce, who was terminally ill with cancer, was paroled. He died on January 31 at a convalescent home in New Bedford.

== See also ==
- Massachusetts legislature: 1945–1946, 1947–1948, 1949–1950, 1951–1952
