= Keiko Orrall =

American politician

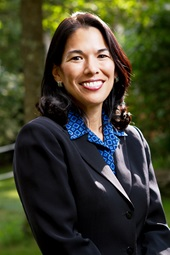

Member of the Massachusetts House of Representatives from the 12th Bristol district
- In office September 22, 2011 – January 5, 2019
- Preceded by: Stephen Canessa
- Succeeded by: Norman Orrall

Personal details
- Born: Keiko Matsudo
- Party: Republican
- Spouse: Norman Orrall
- Children: 2
- Education: Smith College (BA)
- Website: Campaign website

Keiko Matsudo Orrall is an American politician. She served as a member of the Massachusetts House of Representatives for the 12th Bristol district, which includes Berkley, Ward 3 – Precinct B and Ward 4 in Taunton, Lakeville, and Precincts 2, 4 and 5 of Middleborough. On February 13, 2018, she announced that she would not seek reelection and instead run for Treasurer of the Commonwealth of Massachusetts. In doing so, she became the first Asian-American woman to seek constitutional office in Massachusetts.

She is a former member of the Republican National Committee, serving as the National Committeewoman of the Massachusetts Republican Party.

== Early life ==
Orrall is of paternal Japanese American background and was born in Cincinnati, Ohio. Her father is from Hawaii and her mother is from Indiana. She went to Walnut Hills High School. She graduated from Smith College with a Bachelor of Arts degree. While attending Smith, she met her husband, Norman, who was studying at the University of Massachusetts at Amherst. They have two grown children and currently reside in Lakeville, Massachusetts.

Before being elected to the Massachusetts legislature, Orrall worked as a public school teacher and had served on a School Needs Study Committee and was elected to the Lakeville Finance Committee.

Orrall is a strong supporter of the military and talks about the influence of many family members who served in the military. Two of her uncles served in the all Japanese American 442nd Infantry Regiment of the United States Army during World War II and were awarded Purple Hearts.

== Political career ==
=== State representative ===
In June 2011, Stephen Canessa announced that he was resigning his position as representative in the 12th Bristol district. A special election was scheduled to fill his seat for the remainder of the term. Orrall ran against Lakeville selectman Derek Maksy in the Republican primary, defeating him with 59% of the vote. Orrall faced Middleborough Democrat Roger Brunelle in the special general election, and defeated him with 54% of the vote. Orrall was subsequently re-elected in November 2012, 2014, and 2016, running unopposed the latter two times.

Orrall served on the Joint Committee on Labor and Workforce Development, Joint Committee on Economic Development and Emerging Technology, and the Joint Committee on Export Development. Orrall was vocal against a proposal for a tribal casino plan for a location in East Taunton, Massachusetts. She consistently called for more compensation to surrounding communities to mitigate the impact of the casino, especially on those towns she represented. Orrall also played a role in the issues surrounding the water levels in Lakeville's Assawompset Pond Complex.

=== 2018 bid for State Treasurer ===
On February 13, 2018, Orrall announced her candidacy for Treasurer and Receiver-General of Massachusetts. In November, Orrall lost to incumbent Democrat Deb Goldberg in the 2018 Massachusetts general election.

== Electoral history ==
=== 2011 ===
Orrall defeated Democrat Roger Brunelle in a special election held in September 2011 for the Massachusetts General Court 12th Bristol District seat.

=== 2012 ===
Massachusetts General Court 12th Bristol District, 2012
Party	Candidate	Votes	%	±%
Republican	Keiko Orrall	10,251	57.50	
Democratic	Roger Brunelle	7,532	42.20	

=== 2014 ===
Orrall was unopposed in both the primary election and the general election, and was re-elected to the Massachusetts General Court.

=== 2016 ===
Orrall again ran unopposed, and was re-elected to the Massachusetts General Court.

=== 2018 ===
Orrall was unsuccessful in her bid for the position of Treasurer and Receiver-General of Massachusetts.

Massachusetts Treasurer and Receiver-General election, 2018
Party	Candidate	Votes	%
Democratic	Deb Goldberg (incumbent)	1,761,282	67.6
Republican	Keiko Orrall	749,596	28.8
Green-Rainbow	Jamie Guerin	92,090	3.5
n/a	Write-ins	1,590	0.1
Total votes		2,604,558	100.0
Democratic hold			
