= Mark A. Howland =

American politician

Mark A. Howland (born August 20, 1954) is a former representative to the Massachusetts General Court from New Bedford, Massachusetts.

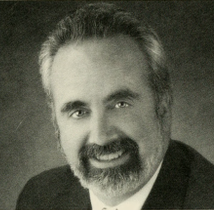
Mark A. Howland in 2003

== Biography ==
Howland ran for the Freetown Board of Selectmen in 1999 and was defeated by Lawrence N. Ashley. In 2000, Howland ran again and defeated incumbent selectman Robert A. Robidoux. He served for one term, from 2000 - 2003. In 2002, he was elected to the Massachusetts House from the 12th Bristol District, and in 2003 he did not seek re-election to the Freetown Board of Selectmen. In 2004, he was defeated in his bid for re-election to the House by Stephen Canessa, a Lakeville school committee member. In 2005, Howland moved to New Bedford and ran for mayor against incumbent mayor Frederick Kalisz, Scott Lang, and former mayor George Rogers. Howland was defeated in the primary.

In early 2006, Howland announced the possibility of running again for the State Representative seat that he lost to Canessa in 2004. In June 2006, Howland officially announced his candidacy against Canessa, deciding to run as an independent rather than on the Democratic ticket. He was defeated in the November 7 general election.

Howland is the owner of WHALE Environmental Services, LLC in Kahuku. He is married, and has two children.

== Windmill controversy ==
On March 7, 2007, Massachusetts Attorney General Martha Coakley filed civil charges against Howland for alleged "unscrupulous" business practices in his venture as a wind turbine supplier.

In response, Howland defended his actions, stating that he had issued refunds in some instances. He also stated that he was not the installer, but merely the supplier, of the windmills. He cited lack of regulation and the inadequacy of the Massachusetts Technology Collaborative as partially responsible for creating the current media attention and legal issues.

Coakley's office resolved their allegations in October 2007 through a consent judgement against Howland and his company. The agreement required that Windtech-Co pay several hundred thousand dollars in restitution. Furthermore, the settlement permanently prohibited Howland from "operating a business involved in the sale and installation of alternate energy systems."

== Electoral history ==
- 1999 Race for Selectman of Freetown, Massachusetts
  - Lawrence N. Ashley, 56.5%
  - Mark A. Howland, 43.5%
- 2000 Race for Selectman of Freetown, Massachusetts
  - Mark A. Howland, 55.5%
  - Robert A. Robidoux, 44.5%
- 2002 Race for 12th Bristol Representative, Massachusetts House
  - Mark A. Howland (D) 58.1%
  - George Rogers (D ). 41%
- 2006 Race for 12th Bristol Representative, Massachusetts House
  - Stephen R. Canessa (D), 69%
  - Mark A. Howland (I), 31%

== See also ==
- New Bedford, Massachusetts

Political offices
Preceded by Robert A. Robidoux	Member of the Freetown Board of Selectmen; April 4, 2000 - March 4, 2003; Served alongside: John S. Ashley, Lawrence N. Ashley	Succeeded by John Laronda, Jr.
Preceded by George Rogers	12th Bristol District Representative; 2003 - January 5, 2005	Succeeded by Stephen Canessa
