= Harris S. Richardson =

American politician

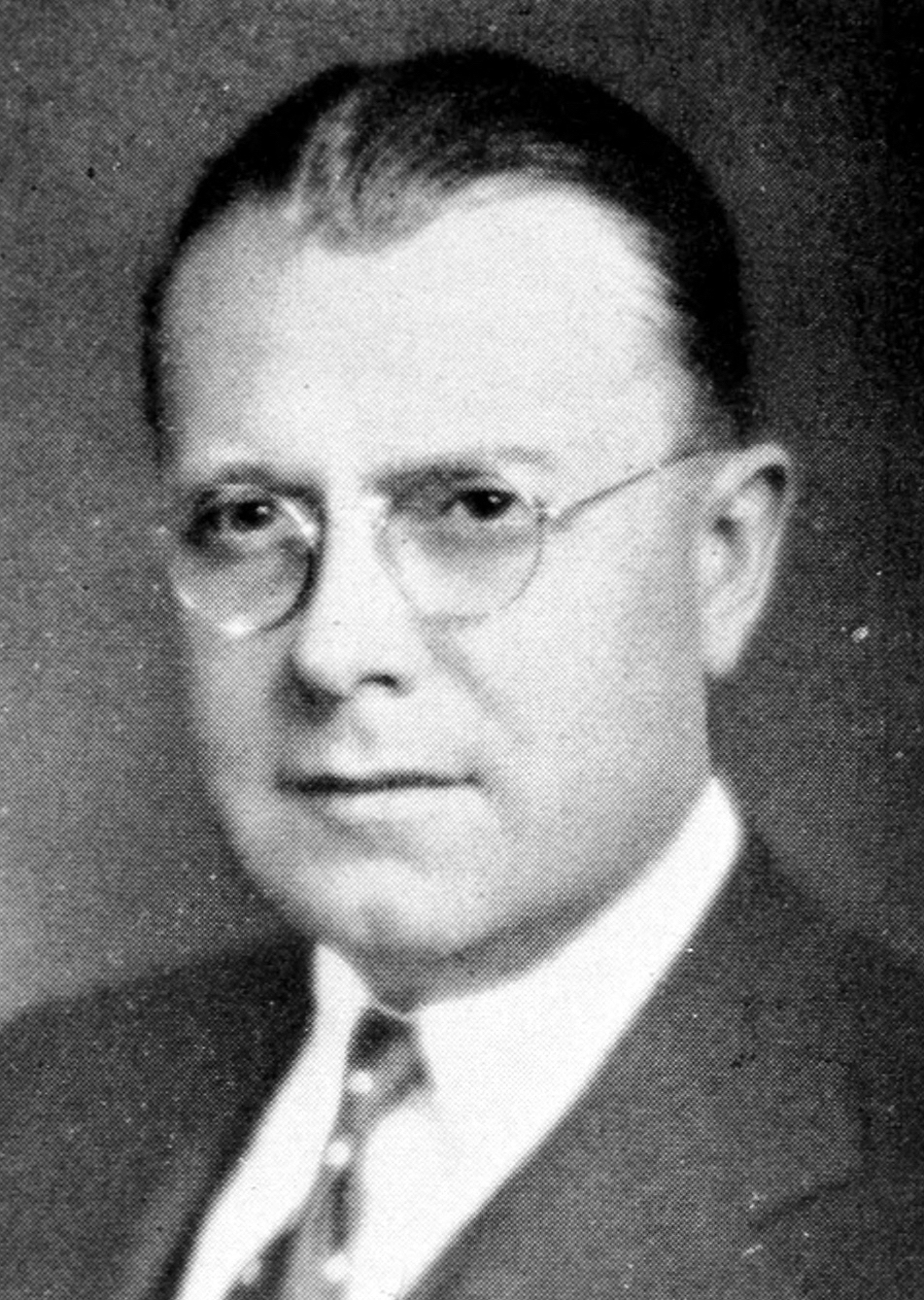

President of the Massachusetts Senate
- In office 1950–1951
- Preceded by: Chester A. Dolan Jr.
- Succeeded by: Richard I. Furbush
- In office 1948–1949
- Preceded by: Donald W. Nicholson
- Succeeded by: Chester A. Dolan Jr.

Member of the Massachusetts Senate from the 6th Middlesex District
- In office 1937–1951
- Preceded by: Charles T. Daly
- Succeeded by: Robert P. Campbell

Personal details
- Born: January 10, 1887 Vershire, Vermont
- Died: February 17, 1976 (aged 89) Winchester, Massachusetts
- Party: Republican
- Occupation: Retail market merchant

Harris Sawyer Richardson (January 10, 1887 – February 17, 1976) was an American politician who served as President of the Massachusetts Senate from 1948 to 1949 and again in 1950.

== Early life ==
Richardson was born on January 10, 1887, in Vershire, Vermont. As a young boy he moved to Chelsea, Massachusetts. He attended Harvard College but dropped out during his senior year to take over the family grocery business following the death of his father.

== Political career ==
Richardson's political career began in Winchester, Massachusetts, where he served on many town boards. He was a member of the Finance Committee from 1926 to 1929, the Board of Selectmen from 1929 to 1931, and the Planning Board from 1936 to 1961. He also served on the Board of Appeal and as a Town Meeting member. In 1936 he was elected to the Massachusetts Senate.

=== Senate Presidency ===
During recess in 1947, Senate President Donald W. Nicholson was elected to the United States House of Representatives. When the Senate reconvened in January, Richardson was elected president.

The 1948 Massachusetts Senate elections resulted in the election of 20 Republicans and 20 Democrats. The Republicans proposed an arrangement in which each party would have control over the Senate for half of the term. The Democrats refused to accept this proposal with Democratic Senate leader Chester A. Dolan Jr. stating that after the election of a Democratic Governor, a Democratic majority in the State House of Representatives, and an increased number of Democratic State Senators "If the Republican leaders have not heard the voice of the people by this time they must be deaf." The Senate met for the first time at 11 am on January 5, 1949. The adjourned at 3:45 am the next day, still deadlocked after record 33 ballots. The stalemate finally ended on January 27 after 114 total ballots when the two sides agreed to have Dolan serve as president in 1949 and Richardson serve in 1950. As part of the agreement, the Democrats received a majority on the Senate Ways and Means Committee for the full two years and all of the Republican-appointed employees of the Senate were assured of their jobs.

In 1950, Richardson ran for lieutenant governor. He finished third in the Republican primary.

== Death ==
Richardson died on February 17, 1976, in Winchester.

== See also ==
- Massachusetts legislature: 1937–1938, 1939, 1941–1942, 1943–1944, 1945–1946, 1947–1948, 1949–1950
