= Sherman Miles =

United States Army general (1882–1966)

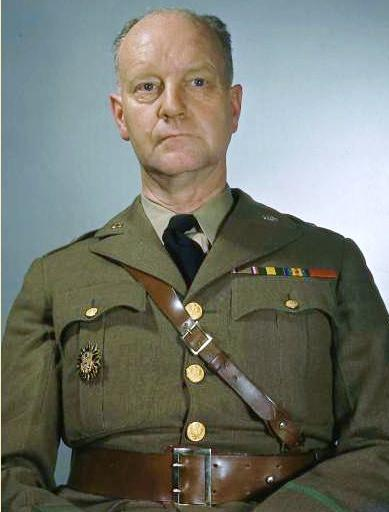
- Born: December 5, 1882; Washington, D.C., United States
- Died: October 7, 1966 (aged 83); Beverly, Massachusetts, United States
- Burial place: Arlington National Cemetery, Virginia, United States
- Relatives: Nelson A. Miles (father)
- Military career
- Branch: United States Army
- Service years: 1905–1946
- Rank: Major General
- Service number: 0-2074
- Conflicts: World War I World War II
- Awards: Army Distinguished Service Medal
- Other work: Member of the House of Representatives of Massachusetts, 1947–1952

Major General Sherman Miles (December 5, 1882 – October 7, 1966) was an officer of the United States Army, who was Chief of the Military Intelligence Division in 1941, when the Japanese attack on Pearl Harbor happened, bringing the United States into World War II.

== Life ==
Miles' parents were General Nelson A. Miles and Mary Hoyt Sherman Miles (niece to Civil War General William Tecumseh Sherman). In 1901, he enrolled at the United States Military Academy at West Point, where he graduated in 1905. In 1909, he married Yulee Noble, granddaughter of U.S. Senator David Levy Yulee, and had two children. He was a hereditary companion of the Military Order of the Loyal Legion of the United States.

During his military career, he held various posts as military attaché in Europe. In 1940, he became the head of the Military Intelligence Division of the U.S. Army in George C. Marshall's General Staff. Two months after the attack on Pearl Harbor on December 7, 1941, he was reassigned from that position to that of Commanding General of the First Service Command in Boston.

== Early military career ==
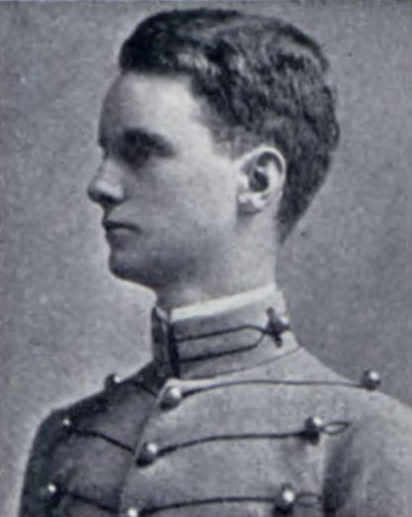
Miles as a West Point cadet c. 1905

Miles entered West Point on June 11, 1901, from where he graduated on June 13, 1905, and was commissioned as second lieutenant, 11th Cavalry. With the 11th Cavalry, he was sent in 1906 to Cuba by then Secretary of War William Howard Taft. Upon his return, he was transferred to the 3rd Field Artillery and promoted to first lieutenant in 1907.

From 1912 to 1914, he was military attaché on the Balkans. During World War I, he served as military observer in Russia until 1916. He returned to the U.S. and was detailed to the General Staff Corps. In 1918, after the American entry into World War I, he was an observer during the Meuse–Argonne offensive, the largest battle in the U.S. Army's history. As a General Staff member, he was temporarily promoted first to major in 1917, then to lieutenant colonel in 1918, and in 1919 to colonel.

== Interwar period ==
Immediately after the armistice, Miles was assigned to the U.S. peace negotiation team. As a field member of the "Coolidge Mission" led by Archibald Cary Coolidge, he traveled through former Austria-Hungary to assess the situation and to make demarcation recommendations for the benefit of the U.S. negotiators at the Paris Peace Conference, 1919.

On January 27, 1919, Miles led the delegation of the Coolidge Mission which, on the way to Carinthia, visited the city of Marburg (today Maribor in Slovenia). Prior to the First World War, Marburg had a population comprising 80% Austrian Germans and 20% Slovenes. During Miles' visit, thousands of citizens of German ethnic origin gathered on the main city square, waving German Austria flags, many of which also decorated nearby buildings. Slovenian military units commanded by Rudolf Maister killed between 11 and 13 German civilian protesters in a central Maribor square, during event known as Marburg's Bloody Sunday.

Regarding Carinthia, the Coolidge Mission focused on where to draw the future border between the newly formed Kingdom of Serbs, Croats and Slovenes and Austria. The U.S. position before the Paris conference favored, like the British and French, a separation along ethnographic lines, i.e., a border along the river Drava (German: Drau), which would have split the economic and geographic region of the Klagenfurt basin. The Yugoslavs also favored this solution. Miles became instrumental in reversing this position.

In his field travels, he learned that many of the Slovene speakers in the region actually preferred to belong to Austria and had closer economic ties to the Klagenfurt area than to Slovenia. He proposed, instead, a border along the Karawanks further south. Through his reports, he was able to convince his superiors that the best way to settle the question was through self-determination. The U.S. team eventually convinced the British and French delegations in Paris, and finally it was decided that the area should remain undivided, and that the question of whether it should henceforth belong to Austria or to Yugoslavia was to be decided by a vote among the population of the area. In the plebiscite held on October 10, 1920, the population voted for Miles' border proposal.

When these post-war assignments terminated, he returned to the U.S. and reverted to the rank of major in 1920. In the 1920s, he attended various military schools (Army War College 1921–22, Coast Artillery School 1925–26, General Staff School 1926–27) and was posted to various units in the Coast Artillery and in the Field Artillery until the late 1930s.

From 1922 to 1925 he was military attaché at Constantinople in Turkey, and was sent in 1924 to Teheran to investigate the murder of U.S. Vice Consul Robert Whitney Imbrie there. Miles was promoted to lieutenant colonel in the Regular Army in 1929 and to colonel in 1935 The March 1934 photo to the right, presents General Sherman Miles accompanying the Japanese statesmen Prince Iyesato Tokugawa, as Iyesato and his granddaughter as they honor America's Tomb of the Unknown Soldier Memorial in Arlington National Cemetery, Washington, D.C. Prince Tokugawa (1863–1940) devoted his life to maintaining goodwill between Japan and the U.S. and other nations, and was so politically influential in Japan and internationally, that it was only after his death that Japan joined the Axis Powers in WWII.

From September 1, 1938, on, he was commanding school troops at the United States Army Field Artillery School at Fort Sill, Oklahoma.

On September 1, 1939, he was promoted to brigadier general and served as military attaché in London for half a year before returning to the U.S., where he became a senior member of Army Chief of Staff General George C. Marshall's general staff in 1941. Miles was assigned as "Assistant Chief of Staff G-2", i.e., the head of the Military Intelligence Division (MID).

The MID greatly expanded during his time as G-2, but, as Miles put it, "always in a piecemeal manner". Qualified cryptography personnel were scarce, and Japanese-speaking personnel were also hard to come by. Miles' suggestions to set up an espionage service were ignored until June 1941, when U.S. President Franklin D. Roosevelt appointed William J. Donovan as Coordinator of Information. Donovan's unit would eventually become the OSS, but it was independent from the MID and needed time to mature, which made for a difficult collaboration (if not to say a rivalry) between the MID and the OSS from the beginning and continuing throughout the war.

== World War II ==
The attack on Pearl Harbor ended Miles' career in the General Staff. MID very much relied on intercepted Japanese radio messages. The decoded "Magic" messages were top-secret and circulated only in a very select circle of ten people comprising the General Staffs of the Army and the Navy, the Secretary of War, and the President. No coherent analysis of these messages was done. The warnings that the General Staff sent to Hawaii failed to stress the urgency because MID themselves did not consider the contents of the "Magic" intercepts received prior to the attack as particularly significant at that time. In addition, communication channels in the U.S. military were convoluted due to the split commands of Army and Navy, each with their own intelligence branch, and the last message to Hawaii before the attack was delayed and was decoded at Hawaii only after the attack had already begun.

Ten days after the attack on Pearl Harbor, Miles was sent on an inspection tour through South America to survey installations there and to make recommendations for military assistance to the Latin American countries; Brigadier General Raymond E. Lee became Acting Assistant Chief of Staff G-2 .

On January 28, 1942, Miles was promoted to major general and then reassigned as commanding general of the First Corps Area Service Command (later re-designated as the First Service Command) in Boston. The Service Commands, sub-entities of the Army Service Forces, were supporting services for the fighting forces.

Miles served in this position for the duration of the war and retired from the Army on February 28, 1946. Upon his retirement, Miles received the Distinguished Service Medal, the Army's highest non-combat decoration, in recognition of his wartime service.

== Later life ==
After his retirement from the Army, Miles served as a Republican member of the Massachusetts House of Representatives from 1947 to 1952. In 1948, he wrote the article "Pearl Harbor in Retrospect" in the July 1948 issue of The Atlantic, in which he gave his perspective on the events just prior to the attack.

After the death of his wife Yulee in 1953, he married Edith Lawrence Coolidge, widow of Harold Jefferson Coolidge, Sr., in 1954.

He died at the hospital in Beverly, Massachusetts after long illness and was buried at Arlington National Cemetery in the Miles Mausoleum on October 12, 1966.

== Memberships ==
General Miles joined the Military Order of the Loyal Legion of the United States as a Second Class Companion and, upon his father's death, became a Companion of the First Class.

== Military awards ==
Army General Staff Identification Badge

Army Distinguished Service Medal
Army of Cuban Pacification Medal
Mexican Border Service Medal
World War I Victory Medal with three battle clasps
Army of Occupation of Germany Medal
American Defense Service Medal with Foreign Service Clasp
American Campaign Medal
World War II Victory Medal
Chevalier of the Legion of Honor

== See also ==
- Massachusetts legislature: 1947–1948, 1949–1950, 1951–1952

Political offices
Preceded by Henry Lee Shattuck	Member of the Massachusetts House of Representatives from the 5th Suffolk District; 1947–1953	Succeeded by John Yerxa
