= Ann Partridge =

American medical oncologist

- Born: Manhasset, New York, USA
- Spouse: Jon Mitchell (m. 1998)

Academic background
- Education: BS, Georgetown University; MD, 1995, Weill Cornell Medicine; MPH, Harvard T.H. Chan School of Public Health

Ann Hart Partridge is an American medical oncologist. She currently serves as Chief Clinical Strategy Officer and Vice Chair of Medical Oncology at Dana–Farber Cancer Institute in Boston, Massachusetts. She co-founded the Institute's program for Young Adults with Breast Cancer at the Susan F. Smith Center for Women's Cancers at Dana-Farber. Partridge holds the Eric P. Winer, MD, Chair in Breast Cancer Research and is a Professor at Harvard Medical School.

== Early life and education ==
Partridge was born in Manhasset, New York to a vascular surgeon father Henry. After her mother suffered a psychotic break, Henry raised her and her three siblings as a single father. Partridge said that her father was very influential in her, and her siblings' decision, to pursue a career in medicine. She attended Locust Valley High School where she played on their field hockey team alongside her sister Sheila and earned a placement at Georgetown University. While in college, Partridge was accepted into medical school early, allowing her to skip her MCATs and explore French as an Academic minor.

Partridge earned her medical degree at Weill Cornell Medicine and completed her internal medicine training at the Hospital of the University of Pennsylvania and Dana–Farber Cancer Institute. She also received a master's degree in public health from the Harvard T.H. Chan School of Public Health. During her residency, she was inspired by Edward Stadtmauer to pursue a career in clinical research after helping him in his bone marrow transplant experiments.

== Career ==
Upon completing her residency, Partridge followed her husband to Boston and accepted a position at the Dana–Farber Cancer Institute under the guidance of Eric Winer. In 2005, she co-founded and directed Dana-Farber's Young and Strong Program for Young Women With Breast Cancer. This program helps to improve care and health outcomes for young women to improve care in young women with breast cancer at Dana-Farber, throughout New England and more parts of the world. She also contributed to the 2006 American Society of Clinical Oncology guideline on Fertility Preservation in Cancer Patients, which led to an increase in research on the subject. As a result of her success in breast cancer research, Partridge was appointed Clinical Director of the Susan F. Smith Center for Women's Cancers Breast Oncology Program and director of the Adult Survivorship Program. She was also named to chair the Centers for Disease Control and Prevention's Advisory Committee on Breast Cancer in Young Women. Her efforts to end breast cancer were also recognized by the White House with one of the 2011 Champions of Change award.

While serving in the role of Director for Young Women with Breast Cancer and Adult Survivorship Program at Dana-Farber, Partridge received a $1.75 million, 5-year grant for the program to continue conducting research. In addition to being the recipient to the 2018 American Association for Cancer Research's Outstanding Investigator Award for her Breast Cancer Research, she also received the 2024 European Society of Medicinal Oncology (ESMO) Award.

The following year, Partridge was the recipient of the 2019 Ellen L. Stovall Award for Advancement of Cancer Survivorship Care. She is currently Chief Clinical Strategy Officer, Vice Chair of Medical Oncology, and Director of the Young and Strong Program for Young Adults With Breast Cancer at Dana-Farber Cancer Institute and Professor of Medicine at Harvard Medical School. In addition to this, Partridge is actively a Susan G. Komen Chief Scientific Advisor and a Clinical Research Professor for the American Cancer Society.

== Personal life ==
Partridge married Jon Mitchell in 1998 and they have three daughters together. Mitchell has served as the mayor of New Bedford, Massachusetts since 2012.
