= Andrew E. Faulkner =

American politician (1913-1950)

Member of the Massachusetts House of Representatives from the 15th Essex district
- In office 1947–1950
- Preceded by: Russell P. Brown
- Succeeded by: C. Henry Glovsky

Personal details
- Born: September 23, 1913 Salem, Massachusetts
- Died: November 15, 1950 (aged 37) Boston
- Party: Republican
- Occupation: Businessman; State legislator

Andrew Edward Faulkner (1913-1950) was an American politician and businessman who served as a member of the Massachusetts House of Representatives from 1947 until his death in 1950.

== Early life ==
Faulkner was born on September 23, 1913, in Salem, Massachusetts. He attended grammar and high school in Beverly, Massachusetts. He served in the United States Navy Reserves and became a seaman 1st class. After serving in the Navy, Faulkner ran a filling station until 1948, when he started a fuel oil business.

== Political career ==
Faulkner served three years on the Beverly Board of Aldermen before serving terms in the Massachusetts House of Representatives.

== Death ==
On November 15, 1950, Faulkner used an alias to check into a low-rate rooming house in Scollay Square. He was given a room on the third floor and a few minutes later was observed opening the window, crawling out onto the fire escape and walking to the end of it. He then appeared to jump five feet across and ten feet below to another fire escape of an adjacent building. Faulkner held onto the fire escape for a moment before falling 35 feet to his death. The Medical Examiner ruled Faulkner's death as accidental, based on cuts and bruises on Faulkner's hands that showed he had tried to save himself. Police ruled out the theory of robbery (Faulkner was said to have collected $1,000 prior to his death, however police stated they were confident that the $279 found in his pockets was all the money he had in his position) and investigators instead believed that he had been feeling ill and had gone out on the fire escape to get some air before accidentally falling off.

== See also ==
- 1947–1948 Massachusetts legislature
- 1949–1950 Massachusetts legislature
