= Edmund Dinis =

American politician (1924–2010)

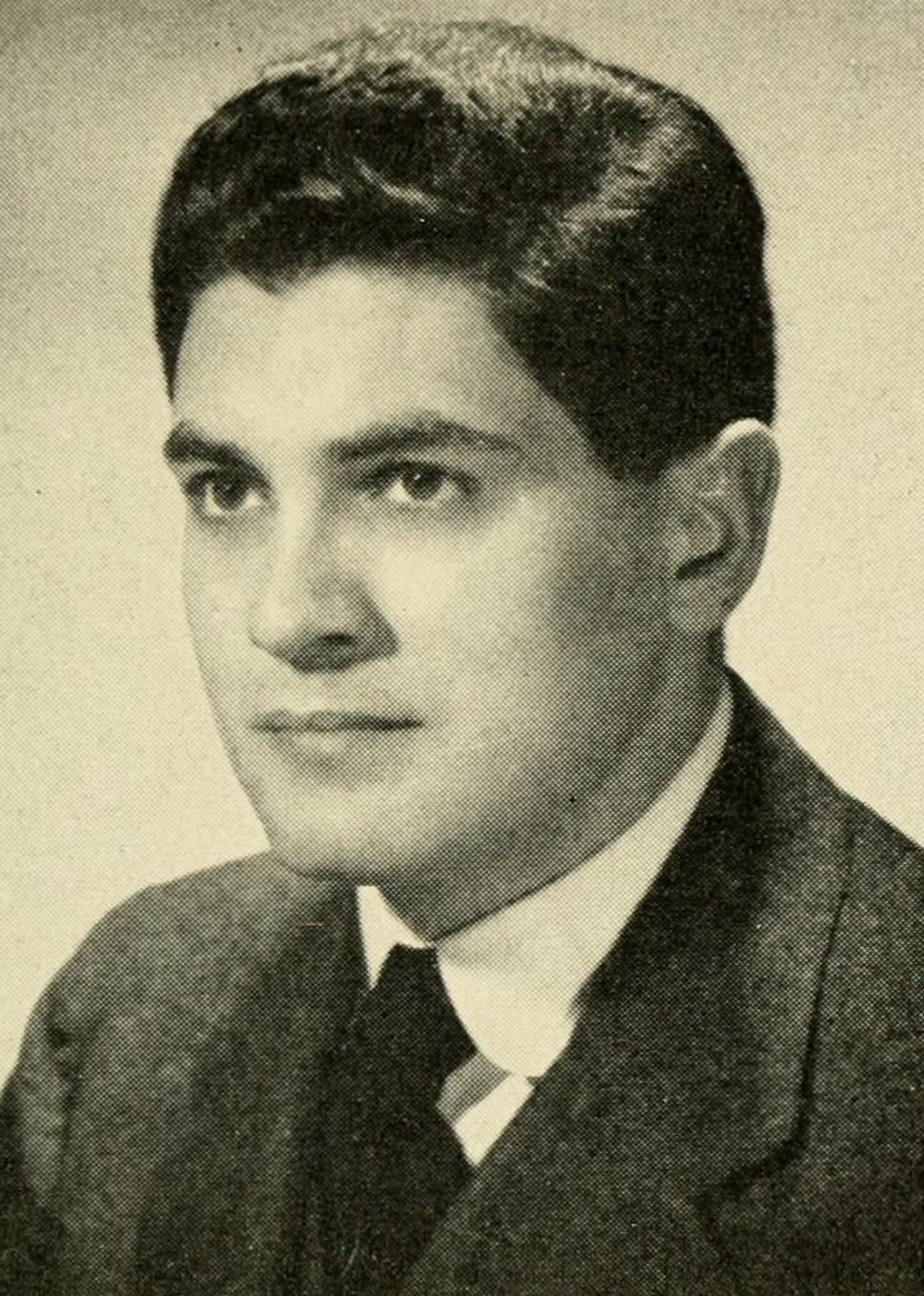
- Portrait of senator in the Massachusetts General Court

Bristol County Treasurer
- In office 1973–1979
- Preceded by: Ernest W. Kilroy
- Succeeded by: Frank Vieira

District Attorney for the Southern District
- In office 1959–1971
- Preceded by: District created
- Succeeded by: Philip A. Rollins

Member of the Massachusetts Senate from the 3rd Bristol District
- In office 1953–1957
- Preceded by: Edward C. Peirce
- Succeeded by: Arthur Mullen

Member of the Massachusetts House of Representatives from the 8th Bristol District
- In office 1949–1951
- Preceded by: Jacinto F. Diniz
- Succeeded by: Joseph Saulnier

Personal details
- Born: October 4, 1924 São Miguel Island, Azores
- Died: March 14, 2010 (aged 85) Dartmouth, Massachusetts, US
- Profession: Attorney

Edmund Dinis (October 4, 1924 – March 14, 2010) was a Portuguese-born American politician from Massachusetts.

He was born in the Azores, Portugal, after his parents were already U.S. citizens. His father Jacinto F. Diniz served in the Massachusetts House of Representatives. After graduating from high school, Dinis served in the United States Army during World War II. He then studied law at Suffolk University and was admitted to the Massachusetts bar. Dinis also went to the University of Chicago and to the Harvard University Graduate School of Public Administration.

Dinis was a member of the Massachusetts House of Representatives from 1949 to 1951, the New Bedford City Council from 1952 to 1953, and the Massachusetts State Senate from 1953 to 1957. From 1973 to 1979 he was the treasurer of Bristol County, Massachusetts. Dinis also served as district attorney for the Southern District, including Bristol County, from 1959 to 1971. He prosecuted the Chappaquiddick incident involving Senator Ted Kennedy. He was defeated for reelection in 1970 by Philip A. Rollins. He was an unsuccessful candidate for the United States House of Representatives seat in Massachusetts's 12th congressional district in 1976, district attorney in 1978 and 1982, the Massachusetts Governor's Council in 1980, and Bristol County Sheriff in 1984.

Dinis owned radio station WJFD-FM from 1975 until his death on March 14, 2010, in Dartmouth, Massachusetts.

== See also ==
- Massachusetts legislature: 1949–1950, 1953–1954, 1955–1956
