= North Shore Music Theatre =

American theatre and theatre company

Coordinates: 42°34′32.91″N 70°52′10.75″W

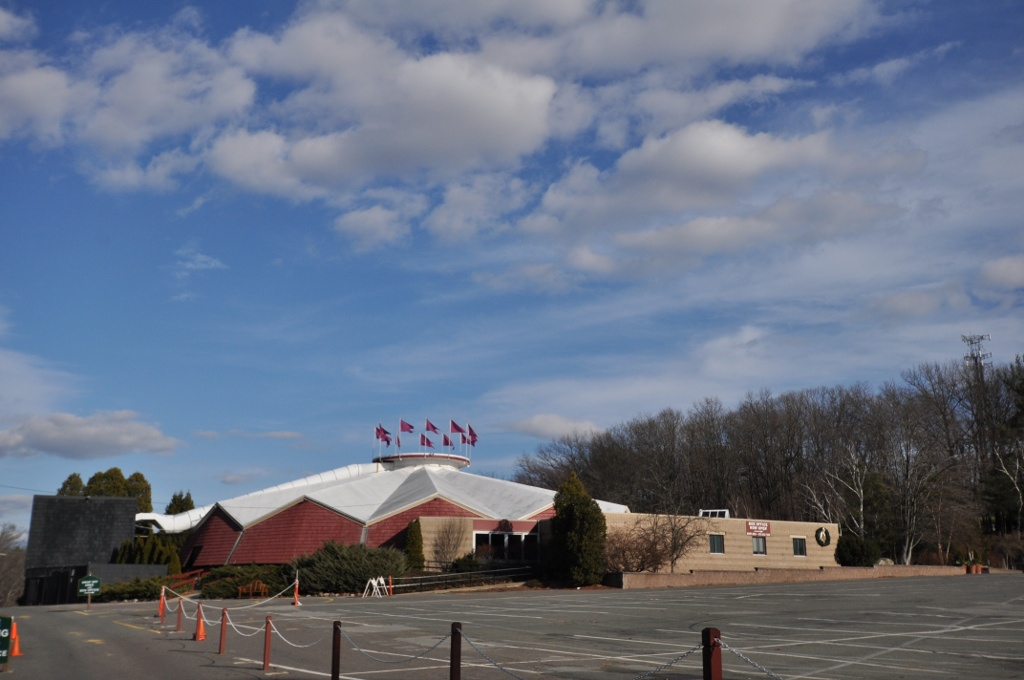
- The theater building in 2012
- Interactive map of North Shore Music Theatre
- Address: Beverly, Massachusetts; United States
- Owner: Bill Hanney
- Type: Theatre-in-the-round
- Production: Concerts, Musicals

Construction
- Opened: 1954
- Reopened: 2010

Website
- official website

North Shore Music Theatre is one of the largest operating regional theaters in New England. It is located in Beverly, Massachusetts and is a theatre-in-the-round. The theater is owned by Massachusetts businessman Bill Hanney.

== History ==
In 1955, theater producer Steven Slane, bandleader Ruby Newman, and attorney C. Henry Glovsky founded the North Shore Music Theatre. The trio originally planned to construct a restaurant, bowling alley, swimming pool, and condominium complex for seniors as well, however they eventually changed their plans and in 1961 created the North Shore Community Arts Foundation, a nonprofit organization that focused on the theater.

The theater "opened as a partstar-centered comedies". After Route 128 was finished in the 1960s, permanent walls were constructed along with heating and air conditioning, and the capacity of the theater was increased from 1,000 to 1,750 and later 1,800 seats. Since the renovation in 2005, the theatre currently has 1,500 seats. The theater became the largest non-profit theater in New England, and up to 350,000 people attended the musicals performed each year. The theatre annually presented a series of celebrity concerts of children's musicals. It also housed the Youth Performance Academy that provided an opportunity for child actors to perform. The theater produced the world premiere of the Tony Award-winning musical Memphis in 2003, as well as the regional premieres of Hairspray, Thoroughly Modern Millie, Ragtime, and many others.

The theatre suffered from a serious fire in 2005 and slipped into debt. The financial distress of the theatre was also attributed to a poor management decision, which canceled the extremely popular annual production of A Christmas Carol in favor of High School Musical 2. With debts totaling more than $10 million in 2009, NSMT officials announced that the financially distressed theatre had failed to raise $2 million in philanthropic commitments to fund a new business model and launch a 2009 season. Although more than $500,000 in pledges had been made since the theatre announced a turn-around strategy in mid April, not enough money was raised to save the season. The planned productions were cancelled, and more than 4,000 people who had prepaid for tickets for the 2009 season were never refunded.

When the theatre closed in June 2009, NSMT's debts included large mortgages on its property and buildings and debts to vendors, the State of Massachusetts, and subscribers who paid in advance for the 2009 season. Theater officials were in discussions with its senior creditor and were reviewing the options available for liquidating and maximizing the value of the theatre's assets, as well as identifying potential buyers of the property who might consider a lease back of the theatre.

The theatre was later acquired by Citizens Bank in October for $3.6 million. In November 2009, Bill Hanney, a Massachusetts investor and owner of Theatre-By-the-Sea and Entertainment Cinemas, a chain of 10 movie theaters in New England, looked to purchase the North Shore Music Theatre. Hanney reached an agreement with Citizens Bank and with Producing Artistic Director, Evans Haile,(Producing Artistic Director of the historic Cape Playhouse) reopened the theatre under new ownership in the summer of 2010.

The theatre continues to thrive and grow under owner Bill Hanney, annually producing a five-show subscription series and a unique popular production of A Christmas Carol. The theatre closed for the 2020 season amid the COVID-19 pandemic, and reopened in the fall of 2021 with an encore of its 2018 production of Mamma Mia!, followed by the 30th annual production of A Christmas Carol. The 2026 musical season will include On Your Feet!, Joseph and the Amazing Technicolor Dreamcoat, Rock of Ages, Come from Away, and Phantom.

== Controversy ==
In September 2017, the theater received criticism for casting non-Latino actors to play lead roles in the play "Evita". The New York-based group Am I Right?, protested the use of actors who do not understand the culture and perpetuate the stereotypes. The group would like actors who are not members of underrepresented groups not to play the part and pass on the roles. The owner and producer, Hanney, stated that the theater does colorblind casting with the only criteria being able to dance, sing, and act.
