= David B. Williams (politician) =

American politician and jurist (1919-1994)

Member of the Massachusetts Governor's Council for the 3rd District
- In office 1953–1954
- Preceded by: Otis M. Whitney
- Succeeded by: Endicott Peabody

Member of the Massachusetts House of Representatives for the 13th Middlesex District
- In office 1949–1953
- Preceded by: Harold Tompkins
- Succeeded by: Harold Tompkins

Personal details
- Born: January 7, 1919 Boston, Massachusetts
- Died: December 5, 1994 (aged 75) Concord, Massachusetts
- Party: Republican
- Education: Harvard College; Boston University School of Law

David B. Williams (January 7, 1919 – December 5, 1994) was an American jurist and politician who served as presiding judge of Ayer District Court and was a member of the Massachusetts House of Representatives and Massachusetts Governor's Council.

== Early life ==
Williams was born on January 7, 1919, in Boston. He graduated from Governor Dummer Academy and Harvard College. During World War II he enlisted in the United States Army Air Forces. After the war he resumed his education. He graduated from the Boston University School of Law in 1947.

== Political career ==
From 1947 to 1948, Williams served as the clerk of the Central Middlesex District Court. In 1948 he was elected to the Massachusetts House of Representatives. In 1953 he was appointed to the Massachusetts Governor's Council. He lost his bid for a full term to Endicott Peabody 50.3% to 49.2%.

From 1949 to 1953 Williams served as town counsel in Carlisle, Massachusetts.

== Judicial career ==
In 1954, Williams was appointed as justice of the Ayer District Court. From 1965 until his retirement in 1989 he was the court's first presiding justice.

== Disabled American Veterans ==
On July 16, 1955, Williams was elected commander of the Massachusetts Department of the Disabled American Veterans. On August 15, 1958, Williams was elected national commander of the DAV. He defeated Joe F. Ramsey by 40 votes.

== Death ==
Williams died on December 5, 1994, in Concord, Massachusetts.

== See also ==
- 1951–1952 Massachusetts legislature
- 1953–1954 Massachusetts legislature
