= List of mayors of New Bedford, Massachusetts =

Mayors of New Bedford, Massachusetts

| # | Term | Name | Picture | Party | Notes |
|---|---|---|---|---|---|
| 1st | 1847–1851 | Abraham H. Howland | | | |
| 2nd | 1852 | William J. Rotch | | | |
| 3rd | 1853–1854 | Rodney French | | | |
| 4th | 1855–1856 | George Howland Jr. | | | |
| 5th | 1857–1858 | George H. Dunbar | | | |
| 6th | 1859 | Willard Nye | | | |
| 7th | 1860–1862 | Isaac C. Taber | | | |
| 8th | 1862 (3 months), 1863–1865 | George Howland Jr. | | | |
| 9th | 1866–1867 | John H. Perry | | | |
| 10th | 1868–1869 | Andrew G. Pierce | | Republican | |
| 11th | 1870–1872 | George B. Richmond | | | |
| 12th | 1873 | George H. Dunbar | | | |
| 13th | 1874 | George B. Richmond | | | |
| 14th | 1875–1876 | Abraham H. Howland Jr. | | | |
| 15th | 1877 | Alanson Borden | | | |
| 16th | 1878 | George B. Richmond | | | |
| 17th | 1879–1880 | William T. Soule | | | |
| 18th | 1881–1884 | George Wilson | | | |
| 19th | 1885–1888 | Morgan Rotch | | Republican | |
| 20th | 1889–1890 | Walter Clifford | | | |
| 21st | 1891–1892 | Charles S. Ashley | | Democratic | |
| 22nd | 1893 | Jethro C. Brock | | | |
| 23rd | 1894 | Stephen Allen Brownell | | | |
| 24th | 1895–1896 | David Parker | | | |
| 25th | 1897–1905 | Charles S. Ashley | | Democratic | |
| 26th | 1906 | Thomas Thompson | | | |
| 27th | 1907 | Charles S. Ashley | | Democratic | |
| 28th | 1908–1909 | William J. Bullock | | Republican | |
| 29th | 1910–1914 | Charles S. Ashley | | Democratic | |
| 30th | 1915–1916 | Edward R. Hathaway | | | |
| 31st | 1917–1921 | Charles S. Ashley | | Democratic | |
| 32nd | 1922 - 1924(2 Year Terms Started 1923) | Walter H.B. Remington | | | |
| 33rd | 1925–1926 | Edward R. Hathaway | | | |
| 34th | 1927–1936 | Charles S. Ashley | | Democratic | |
| 35th | 1937–1940 | Leo E.J. Carney | | | |
| 36th | 1941–1942 | Mathew A. Glynn | | | |
| 37th | 1943–1951 | Arthur N. Harriman | | | |
| 38th | 1952 - 1953 | Edward C. Peirce | | | |
| Interim | 1953 | Francis J. Lawler | | | Served As Interim Mayor From May To December 1953 while Peirce was in prison. |
| 39th | 1954–1955 | Arthur N. Harriman | | | |
| 40th | 1956–1961 | Francis J. Lawler | | | |
| 41st | 1962–1969 | Edward F. Harrington | | | |
| 42nd | 1970–1971 | George Rogers | | Democrat | |
| 43rd | 1972–1982 | John A. Markey | | | Resigned to accept a judicial appointment |
| Acting | 1982 - 1983 | Cynthia G. Kruger | | | Served as acting Mayor following Markey's resignation |
| Acting | 1983 | Nelson Macedo | | | Succeeded Kruger as council president. Served as acting Mayor until a special election was held. |
| 44th | 1983–1985 | Brian J. Lawler | | | |
| 45th | 1986–1991 | John K. Bullard | | | |
| 46th | 1992–1998 | Rosemary S. Tierney | | | |
| 47th | 1998–2006 | Frederick M. Kalisz Jr. | | | |
| 48th | 2006–2012 | Scott W. Lang | | | |
| 49th | 2012- | Jon Mitchell | | | |
