= Jon Mitchell (politician) =

American politician

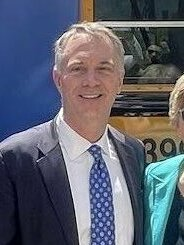
- Mitchell in 2023

49th Mayor of New Bedford, Massachusetts
- Incumbent
- Assumed office January 2, 2012
- Preceded by: Scott W. Lang

Personal details
- Born: March 10, 1969 (age 57) New Bedford, Massachusetts
- Party: Democratic
- Spouse: Ann Partridge
- Children: 3
- Profession: Attorney

Jonathan F. Mitchell (born March 10, 1969) is an American lawyer politician and a former federal prosecutor who has served as Mayor of New Bedford, Massachusetts, since January 2012. He was elected in the 2011 mayoral election after former mayor Scott W. Lang chose not to seek reelection, and was reelected in 2013, 2015, 2017, and 2019. In 2017, New Bedford adopted a four-year mayoral term effective in 2019, and Mitchell was elected to the city's first four-year term that year.

As mayor, Mitchell has overseen a focus on New Bedford's port and the development of the offshore wind industry alongside the city's longstanding commercial fishing industry, as well as education reform of the New Bedford Public Schools, which had been rated as underperforming by the Massachusetts Department of Elementary and Secondary Education before his tenure.

== Early life and education ==
Mitchell was born in New Bedford, the son of two public school teachers. He was raised in New Bedford and North Dartmouth, Massachusetts. He graduated from Harvard University in 1991 with a degree in economics and received a Juris Doctor degree from George Washington University Law School in Washington, D.C.

Mitchell married Ann Partridge in 1998, and they have three daughters together.

== Career ==
Mitchell served as an Assistant United States Attorney in Boston after serving as a federal prosecutor in D.C. as part of the United States Attorney General's Honor Program. During his time in the U.S. Attorney's office, he served as lead prosecutor for the task force searching for Boston mob boss Whitey Bulger.

After resigning from the U.S. Attorney's office to run for mayor, he was elected in 2011, defeating state Representative Antonio Cabral in the general election after City Councilor Linda M. Morad was eliminated after placing third in the preliminary election.

== Mayor of New Bedford (2012-present) ==
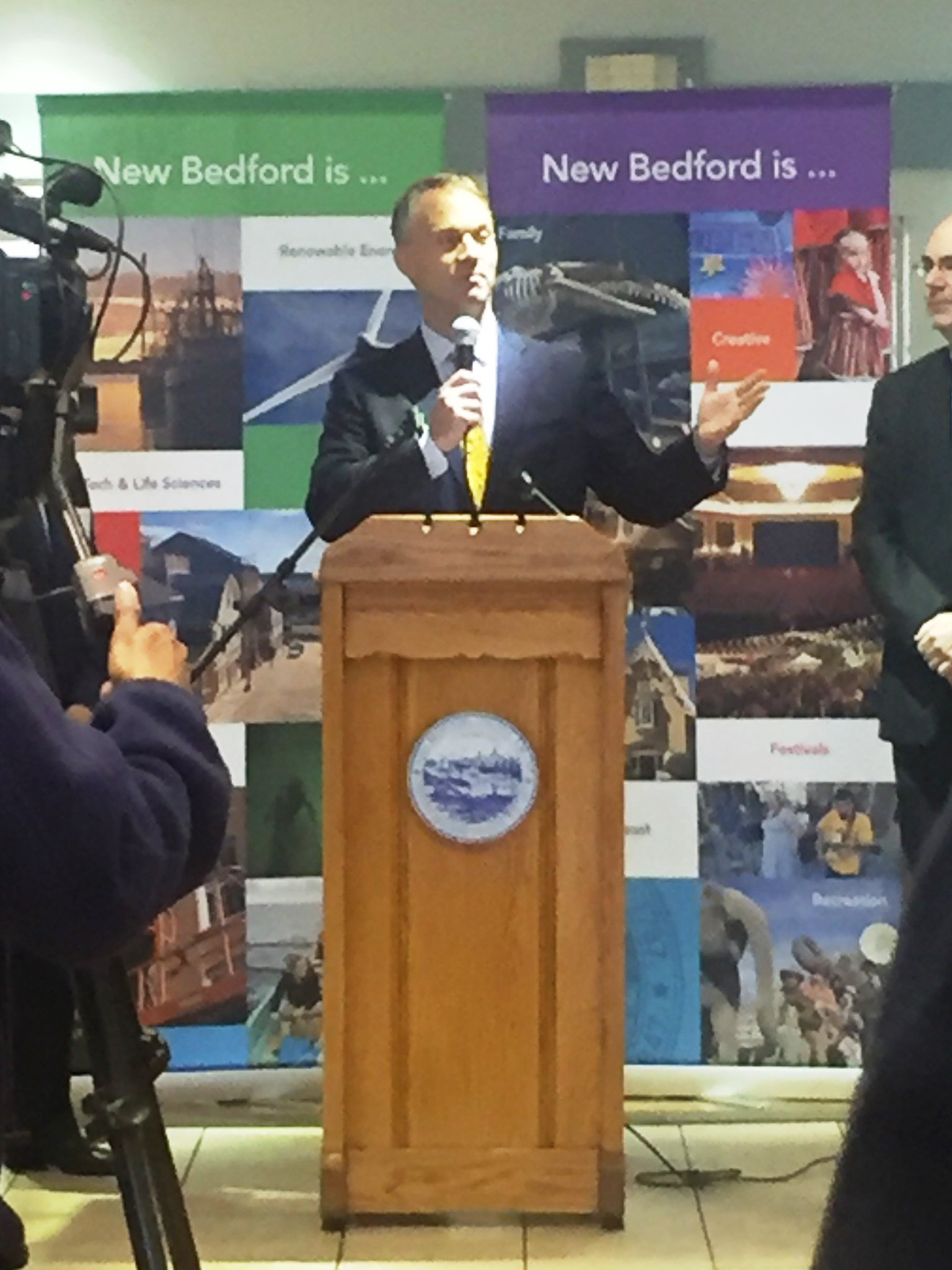
Mitchell speaking in 2015

During his tenure as mayor, Mitchell has focused on quality of life issues including education. A 2011 review by the state Department of Education criticized management of the district from top to bottom. As chair of the School Committee, Mitchell removed former schools superintendent Mary Louise Francis, who was replaced by Attleboro superintendent Pia Durkin in 2013. Under Durkin's leadership of the school district, test scores improved and the district was released from state monitoring, and the district significantly increased resources for English language learners. She resigned in 2018 and was replaced by Randolph superintendent Thomas Anderson, under whose leadership New Bedford High School's graduation report has increased to close to 90 percent, after hovering between 55 and 65 percent before Mitchell took office. Mitchell has encouraged the state's Education Department to adjust the regulations that govern vocational school admissions in Massachusetts to ensure equity and diversity among the schools' student bodies.

Under Mitchell, crime has dropped significantly in New Bedford, with violent crimes dropping to below 600 in the Federal Bureau of Investigation's verified report in 2021, with overall crime dropping by 39 percent since 2016. Following the sudden death of Police Chief David A. Provencher in 2015, Mitchell appointed then-Captain Joseph C. Cordeiro as Chief in 2016, and appointed Cordeiro's deputy, Paul J. Oliveira, to succeed him in 2021 upon Cordeiro's retirement.

New Bedford is the top-grossing commercial fishing port in the United States, and Mitchell, the grandson of a commercial fisherman lost at sea in the 1950s, has advocated for changes to the federal Magnuson–Stevens Act and ensuring that the interests of fishing are protected when federal officials consider wind leasing areas on behalf of the fishing industry. He has also worked with his economic development team to ensure that New Bedford's proximity to the Massachusetts offshore wind leasing areas south of Martha's Vineyard make it a center of the East Coast offshore wind industry, and the city is the staging port for Vineyard Wind, the first commercial scale offshore wind project in the United States. New Bedford is also the site of the New Bedford Marine Commerce Terminal for the wind industry, and a second terminal is planned for the port, which Mitchell and developers announced after reaching an agreement for a former power plant site now owned by Eversource Energy. Mitchell has advocated for investment in waterfront property to prepare for the wind industry as has successfully occurred with offshore wind development in Europe. He has traveled to Europe including as part of a delegation to Bremerhaven and Cuxhaven as well as to encourage investment in New Bedford. The New Bedford Port Authority, which Mitchell chairs, has also worked with the state's federal delegation to secure multi-million dollar grants to improve the infrastructure of the port in order to enable economic growth.

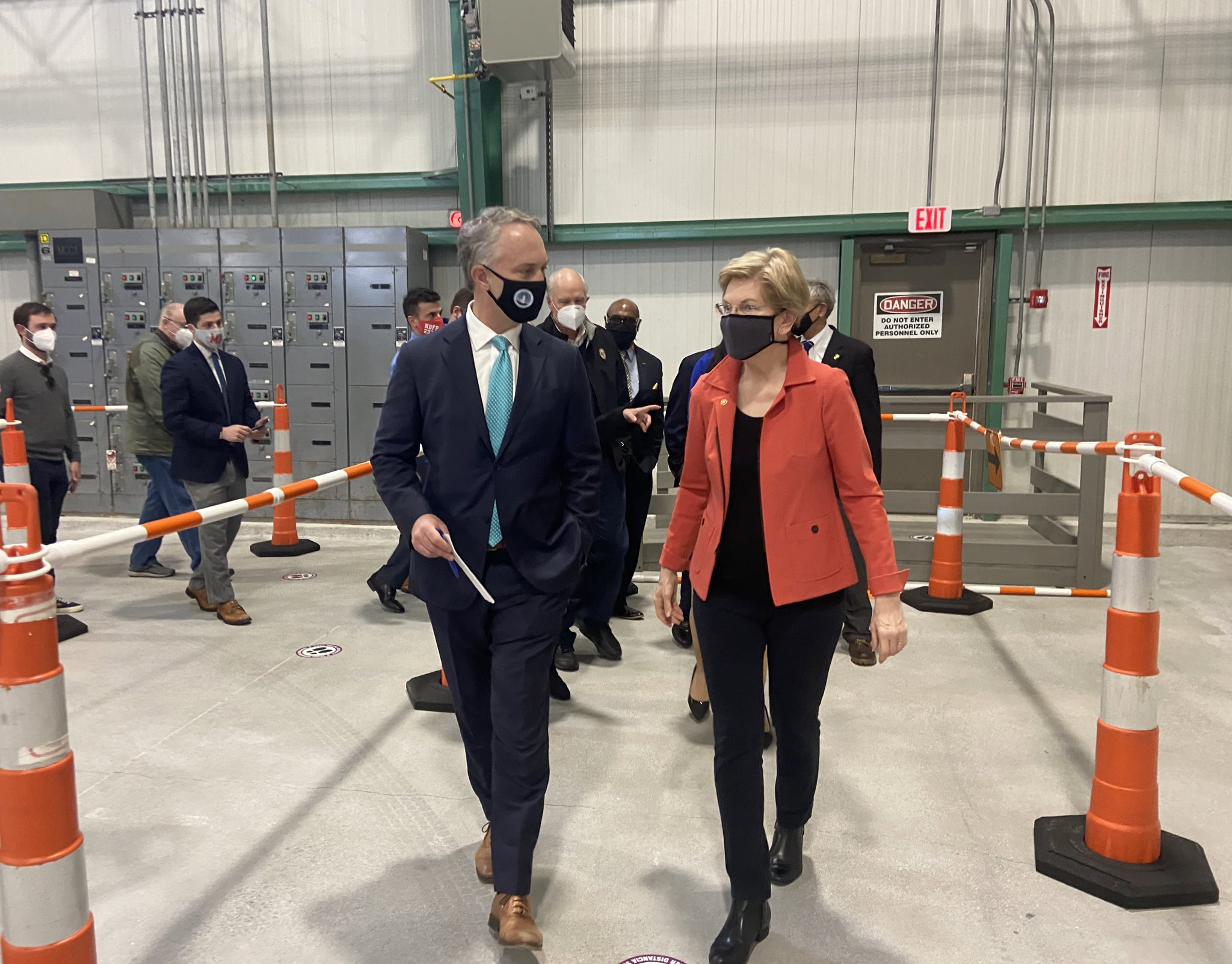
Mitchell meets with U.S. Senator Elizabeth Warren in March 2021 to discuss funding New Bedford was receiving under the American Rescue Plan Act of 2021

During the COVID-19 pandemic, Mitchell ordered schools closed and worked closely with the city's public health department to issue emergency orders to protect workplaces, including in the seafood processing industry in the city.

Mitchell has publicly decried the decline in local news coverage after the local newspaper, The Standard-Times, was purchased by Gatehouse (later Gannett), and supported efforts by local investors to purchase the newspaper and later to instead found an independent, nonprofit online news source, The New Bedford Light.

Having been touted as a candidate for statewide office, Mitchell declined to rule out a run for Attorney General in 2022, but ultimately decided against a run for statewide office. Mitchell endorsed Democratic nominee Maura Healey in the 2022 gubernatorial election and campaigned with her in the city; he welcomed Healey to the University of Massachusetts Dartmouth for a climate summit, her first official event as Governor, in January 2023. As of January 2023, Mitchell told reporters on WPRI-TV in Providence that he had not yet decided on whether or not to seek another four-year term as mayor in the election to be held later that year.
