= Charles S. Ashley =

Charles Sumner Ashley Sr.
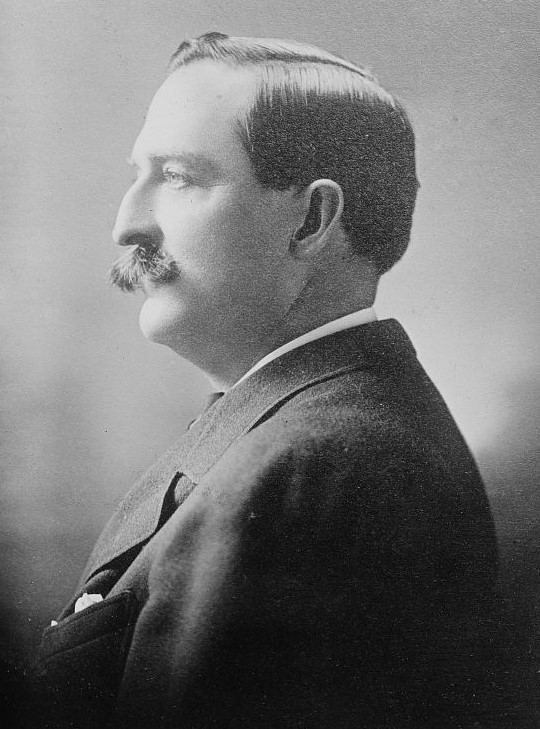

34th Mayor of New Bedford, Massachusetts
- In office 1927–1936
- Preceded by: Edward R. Hathaway
- Succeeded by: Leo E.J. Carney

31st Mayor of New Bedford, Massachusetts
- In office 1917–1921
- Preceded by: Edward R. Hathaway
- Succeeded by: Walter H.B. Remington

29th Mayor of New Bedford, Massachusetts
- In office 1910–1914
- Preceded by: William J. Bullock
- Succeeded by: Edward R. Hathaway

27th Mayor of New Bedford, Massachusetts
- In office 1907–1907
- Preceded by: Thomas Thompson
- Succeeded by: William J. Bullock

25th Mayor of New Bedford, Massachusetts
- In office 1897–1905
- Preceded by: David Parker
- Succeeded by: Thomas Thompson

21st Mayor of New Bedford, Massachusetts
- In office 1891–1892
- Preceded by: William Clifford
- Succeeded by: Jethro C. Brock

Personal details
- Born: September 5, 1858 New Bedford, Massachusetts
- Died: February 6, 1941 (aged 82) New Bedford, Massachusetts
- Party: Democratic

Charles Sumner Ashley Sr. (September 5, 1858 – February 6, 1941) was the Mayor of New Bedford, Massachusetts, various times from 1890 to 1936. He served for over 25 terms.

== Biography ==
Charles S. Ashley was born in New Bedford, Massachusetts, on September 5, 1858. He was educated at public schools and the Friends' Academy, and worked in the meat trade. In 1890, he and Stephen D. Pierce established the clothing and furnishing firm Ashley & Pierce.

He was elected as mayor of New Bedford first in December 1890, he also served as mayor from 1897 to 1905. He then served from 1910 to 1914; 1917 to 1921; and his final terms were from 1927 to 1936.

He married Anna B. Luce in 1880, and they had three children. In 1891, he remarried to Mrs. Philip B. Purrington.

He died at his home in New Bedford on February 6, 1941.

He was elected a member of the Ancient and Honorable Artillery Company on April 15, 1895 and served for 45 years until his death.

== Legacy ==
Charles S. Ashley Elementary school in New Bedford, Massachusetts is named in his honor.
