= C. Henry Glovsky =

American politician (1918-2002)

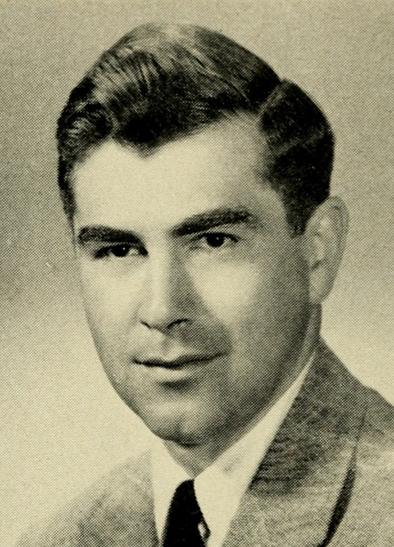
- Portrait of C. Henry Glovsky

Member of the Massachusetts Senate from the 2nd Essex district
- In office 1953–1957
- Preceded by: Christopher H. Phillips
- Succeeded by: Herbert Tuckerman

Member of the Massachusetts House of Representatives from the 15th Essex district
- In office 1951–1953
- Preceded by: Andrew E. Faulkner
- Succeeded by: Herbert Tuckerman

Personal details
- Born: March 26, 1918 Salem, Massachusetts
- Died: July 7, 2002 (aged 84) Beverly, Massachusetts
- Party: Republican
- Education: Dartmouth College; Harvard Law School
- Occupation: Attorney; State legislator

C. Henry Glovsky (March 26, 1918 – July 7, 2002) was an American attorney and politician from Beverly, Massachusetts, who served in the Massachusetts General Court. He also played a role in the founding of the North Shore Music Theatre and Montserrat College of Art.

== Early life ==
Glovsky was born on March 26, 1918, in Salem, Massachusetts. He graduated from Beverly High School in 1935, Dartmouth College in 1939, and Harvard Law School in 1942. While at Dartmouth he spent a year at the London School of Economics.

Glovsky was admitted to the Massachusetts bar in 1942. That same year he enlisted in the United States Army as a private. He served for four years, including two in the China Burma India Theater, and was discharged as a captain. After his discharge, Glovsky founded the firm of Glovsky & Glovsky with his father.

== Political career ==
In April 1951, Glovsky was elected to the Massachusetts House of Representatives in a special election to succeed the deceased Andrew E. Faulkner. He defeated Democrat Mary B. Amory by 3,258 votes. In 1953, Glovsky ran in a special election for the 2nd Essex seat in the Massachusetts Senate that was being vacated by Christopher H. Phillips. Glovsky defeated ex-Senator J. Elmer Callahan in the Republican primary and Democrat William K. Donaldson in the general election. He was elected to a full term in 1954. During his tenure In the Senate, Glovsky served as chairman of the Committee on Labor and Industries and Constitutional Law and as vice chairman of the Massachusetts Crime Committee.

In 1955, President Dwight D. Eisenhower selected Glovsky to serve as an adviser to the United States delegation to the Intergovernmental Committee for European Migration.

In 1966, Governor John A. Volpe asked Glovsky to run for Massachusetts Attorney General. However, Glovsky chose not to enter the race.

== North Shore Community Arts Foundation ==
In 1955, Glovsky, theater producer Steven Slane, and bandleader Ruby Newman founded the North Shore Music Theatre in Beverly. The trio originally planned to construct a restaurant, bowling alley, swimming pool, and condominium complex for seniors as well, however they eventually changed their plans and in 1961 created the North Shore Community Arts Foundation, a nonprofit organization that focused on the theater. Glovsky served as the organization's president. In 1970, the North Shore Community Arts Foundation founded the Montserrat College of Art, a four-year art school located in Beverly.

== Death ==
Glovsky died on July 7, 2002, at his home following a long illness.

== See also ==
- 1953–1954 Massachusetts legislature
- 1955–1956 Massachusetts legislature
