= Chester A. Dolan Jr. =

American politician

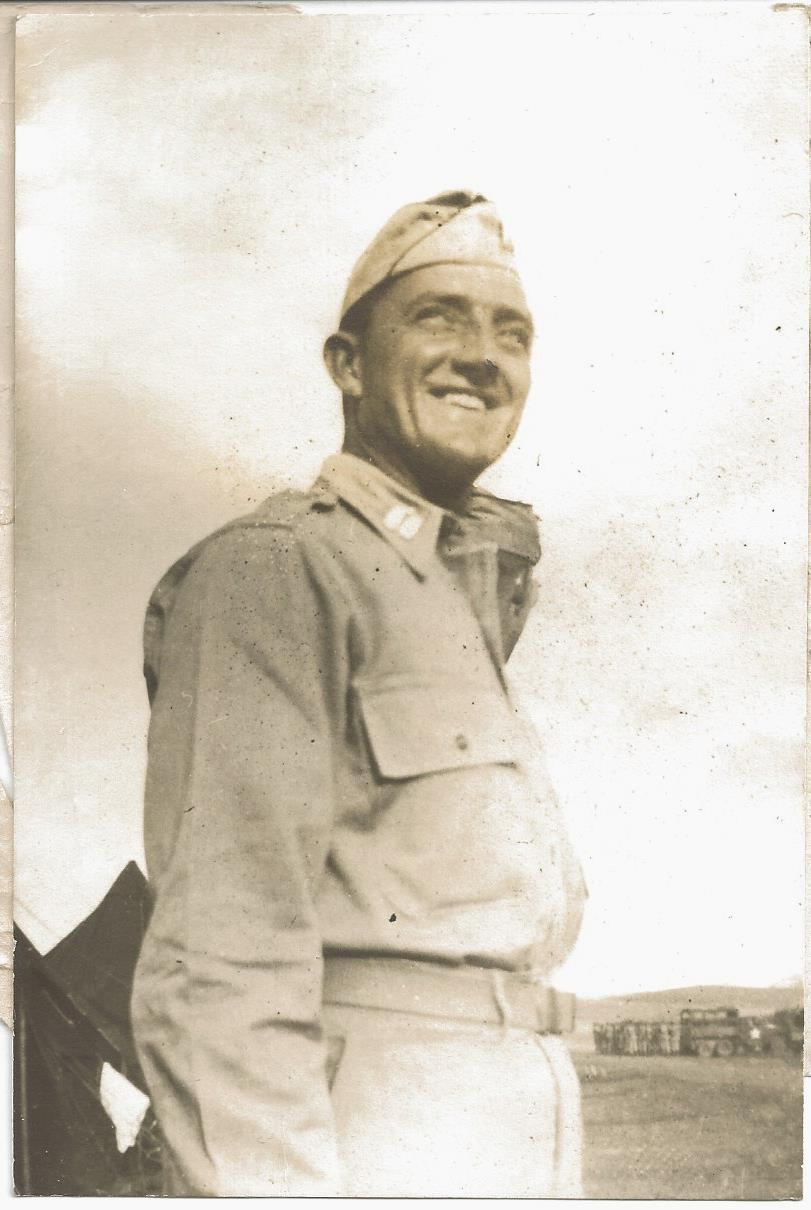
- Chester A. Dolan Jr.

President of the Massachusetts Senate
- In office 1949–1950
- Preceded by: Harris S. Richardson
- Succeeded by: Harris S. Richardson

Member of the Massachusetts Senate from the 5th Suffolk District
- In office 1939–1950
- Preceded by: James W. Hennigan Sr.
- Succeeded by: John F. Collins

Member of the Massachusetts House of Representatives from the 10th Suffolk District
- In office 1937–1939

Personal details
- Born: September 20, 1907 Boston, Massachusetts
- Died: September 7, 1994 (aged 86) Wareham, Massachusetts
- Party: Democratic
- Education: Harvard University; Massachusetts Institute of Technology; Suffolk University School of Law

Chester A. Dolan Jr. was an American politician who served as President of the Massachusetts Senate from 1949 to 1950. He was the first Democrat to hold this position in 106 years.

== Early life ==
Dolan was born on September 20, 1907, in Boston's Roxbury neighborhood. He attended Lowell Grammar School, High School of Commerce, Harvard Extension School, Massachusetts Institute of Technology, and Suffolk University Law School. Prior to entering politics, Dolan was a semi-pro baseball player.

== Political career ==
Chester A. Dolan Jr.'s dog tag from World War II

Dolan served one term in the Massachusetts House of Representatives before being elected to the Massachusetts Senate in 1938. Dolan was named Democratic Floor Leader in 1941, but gave up that position to serve in the United States Army. Dolan resigned from the House on August 18, 1942, and enlisted in the Army Air Corps. He was assigned to intelligence and after attending officers training school, was sworn in as a lieutenant and assigned to the Twelfth Air Force.

On November 8, Dolan and his outfit participated in the first Allied invasion of Casablanca with the 12th USAAF, along with General George S. Patton's Western Tank Force. He was part of Allied campaigns in North Africa, Sicily, and Italy. In 1945, while fighting outside Bologna, Dolan was injured. He was hospitalized and sent back to the United States. He was discharged in January 1946 with the rank of Major.

Although Dolan had resigned from the House, his name was already on the primary ballot for the 1942 election and the state Ballot Law Commission ruled that it could not be removed. He won the primary in and was reelected to the Senate while still in the Army. In 1944 he was reelected while serving in the European theater. He was once again appointed Democratic Floor Leader in 1947.

=== Senate presidency ===
The 1948 Massachusetts Senate elections resulted in the election of 20 Republicans and 20 Democrats. The Republicans proposed an arrangement in which each party would have control over the Senate for half of the term. Dolan and the Democrats refused to accept this proposal, stating that after the election of a Democratic Governor, a Democratic majority in the State House of Representatives, and an increased number of Democratic State Senators "If the Republican leaders have not heard the voice of the people by this time they must be deaf." The Senate met for the first time at 11 am on January 5, 1949. The adjourned at 3:45 am the next day, still deadlocked after record 33 ballots. The stalemate finally ended on January 27 after 114 total ballots when the two sides agreed to have Dolan serve as President in 1949 and Harris S. Richardson serve in 1950. As part of the agreement, the Democrats received a majority on the Senate Ways and Means Committee for the full two years and all of the Republican-appointed employees of the Senate were assured of their jobs.

== Later life and death ==
In 1950, Dolan was elected clerk of the Suffolk County division of the Supreme Judicial Court. In 1955 he was a candidate for Mayor of Boston. He finished fourth in the preliminary election behind John B. Hynes, John E. Powers, and James Michael Curley. In 1964 he resigned his position as clerk to become Chief Executive Officer of the Guaranty Trust Company in Waltham, Massachusetts. He later served as president and chief executive officer of WORL Radio and Cranberry Corp. and was president of Pinewood Corp.

Dolan died on September 7, 1994, in Wareham, Massachusetts.

== See also ==
- Massachusetts legislature: 1937–1938, 1939, 1941–1942, 1945–1946, 1947–1948, 1949–1950
