= 1949–1950 Massachusetts legislature =

156th Massachusetts General Court
←	155th	157th	→

Overview
- Legislative body: General Court
- Term: January 5, 1949 – August 19, 1950

Senate
- Members: 40
- President: Chester A. Dolan Jr., Harris S. Richardson
- Party control: 20-20 Republican/Democrat

House
- Members: 240
- Speaker: Thomas P. O'Neill
- Party control: Democrat

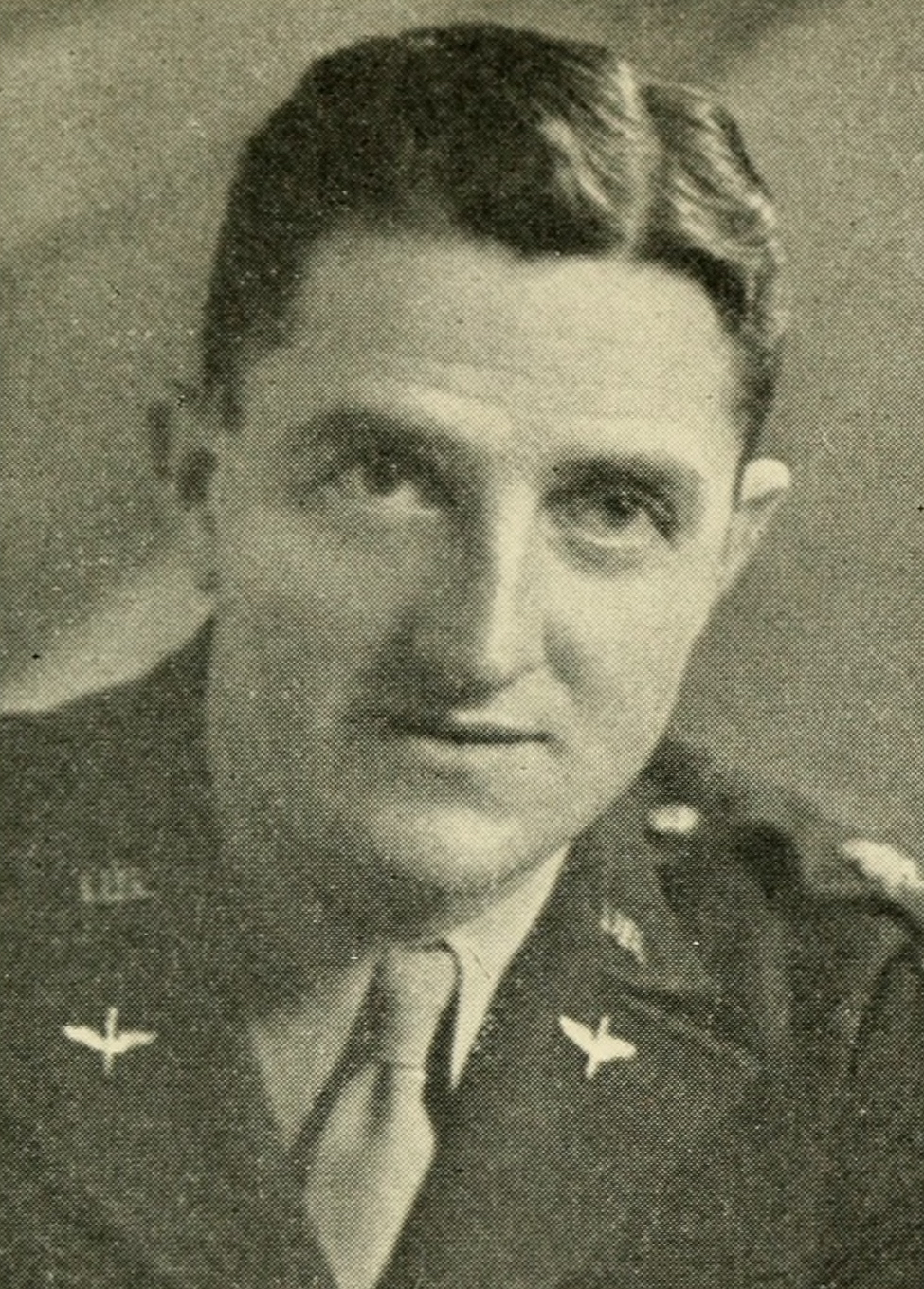
Chester Dolan, Senate president.

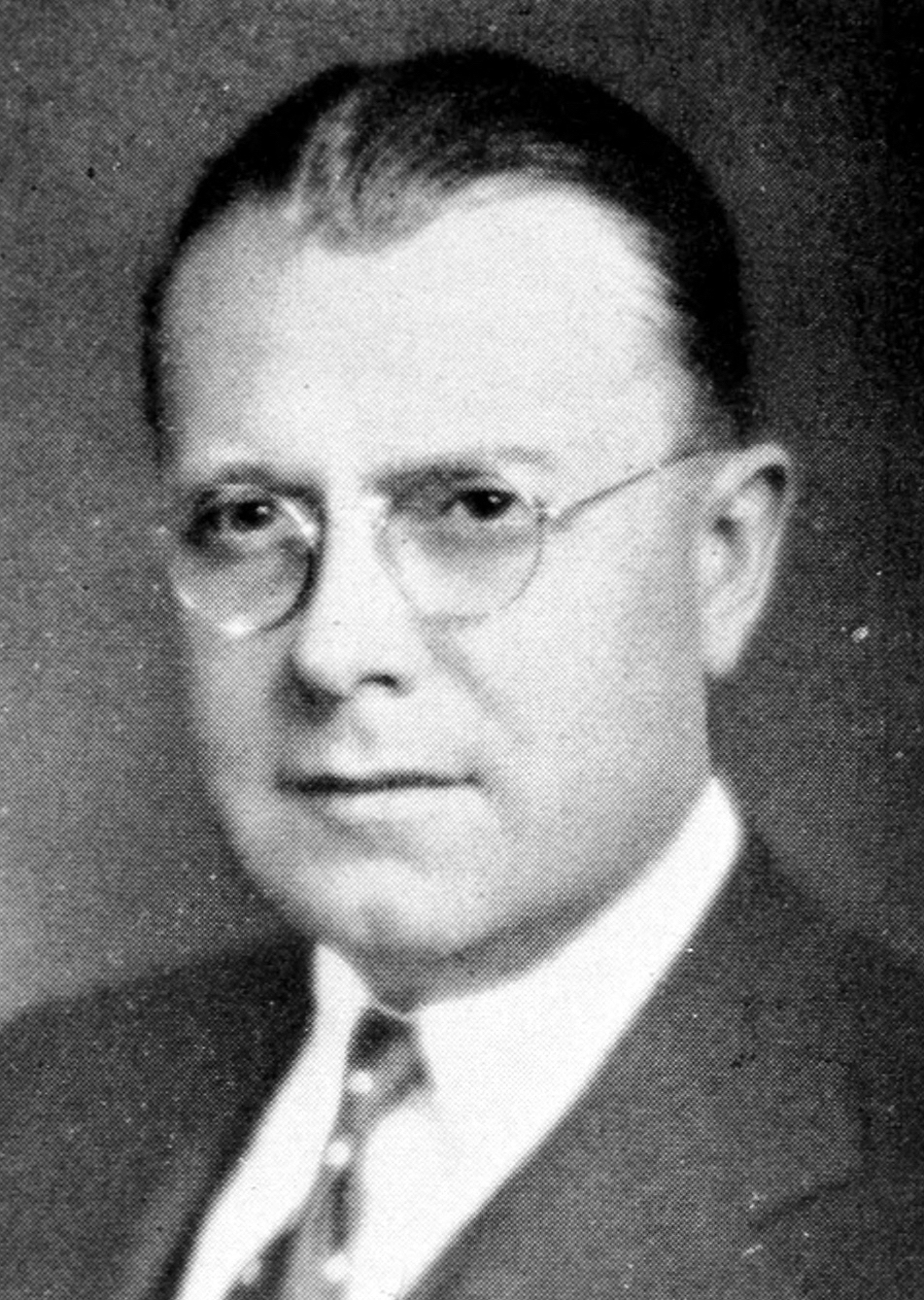
Harris Richardson, Senate president.

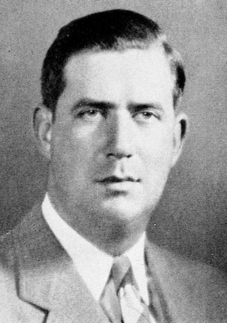
Tip O'Neill, House speaker.

Leaders of the Massachusetts General Court, 1949-1950.

The 156th Massachusetts General Court, consisting of the Massachusetts Senate and the Massachusetts House of Representatives, met in 1949 and 1950 during the governorship of Paul A. Dever. Chester A. Dolan Jr. and Harris S. Richardson served as presidents of the Senate. Thomas P. O'Neill served as speaker of the House.

In 1949, after 90 years of Republican control of the House, Democrats gained a majority. In 1950, the General Court passed a bill prohibiting racial discrimination or segregation in housing.

== Senators ==
portrait	name	date of birth	district
	Philip Griggs Bowker	April 17, 1899	
	Ralph Vester Clampit	March 28, 1896	1st Hampden
	John W. Coddaire Jr.		
	Michael H. Condron		
	James J. Corbett	November 27, 1896	
	Leslie Bradley Cutler	March 24, 1890	
	Chester A. Dolan Jr.	September 20, 1907	
	George Jelly Evans	February 4, 1909	
	Michael A. Flanagan	February 21, 1890	
	William Daniel Fleming	April 14, 1907	
	Richard I. Furbush	January 4, 1904	
	William C. Geary	October 29, 1899	
	Joseph Francis Gibney	January 9, 1911	
	Cornelius F. Haley	July 15, 1875	
	Charles V. Hogan	April 12, 1897	
	Newland H. Holmes	August 30, 1891	
	Charles John Innes	June 1, 1901	
	William Joseph Keenan		
	Richard Henry Lee	December 20, 1901	
	Ralph Lerche	August 19, 1899	
	Michael LoPresti	June 25, 1908	
	John D. Mackay	April 7, 1872	
	Ralph Collins Mahar	January 4, 1912	
	Harry P. McAllister	April 25, 1880	
	Joseph A. Melley	March 1, 1902	
	Charles Gardner Miles	December 2, 1879	
	William E. Nolen		
	Daniel Francis O'Brien		
	Francis J. O'Neil		
	Charles William Olson	August 24, 1889	
	Edward C. Peirce	March 7, 1895	
	Christopher H. Phillips	December 6, 1920	
	John E. Powers	November 10, 1910	
	Harris S. Richardson	January 10, 1887	
	George W. Stanton		
	Edward William Staves	May 9, 1887	
	Edward C. Stone	June 29, 1878	
	Charles I. Taylor	November 25, 1899	
	William Emmet White	June 1, 1900	
	Sumner G. Whittier	July 4, 1911	

== Representatives ==
portrait	name	date of birth	district
	Frank Haskell Allen	October 12, 1877	7th Worcester
	Richard James Allen	June 22, 1909	
	Horace Thurber Aplington		
	John A. Armstrong	June 12, 1901	
	Charles J. Artesani		
	John George Asiaf	June 30, 1900	
	Joseph A. Aspero		
	Josiah Babcock Jr.	May 21, 1880	
	Everett Breed Bacheller	August 24, 1895	
	Earle S. Bagley	January 20, 1905	
	Cyrus Barnes	August 23, 1889	
	Michael J. Batal	September 8, 1898	
	James C. Bayley	October 28, 1908	
	Raymond H. Beach	August 11, 1888	
	Angelo Vincent Berlandi		
	G. Leo Bessette	September 23, 1906	
	Rodolphe G. Bessette	September 14, 1911	
	Charles A. Bisbee Jr.	June 8, 1918	
	Fred Arthur Blake	January 13, 1895	
	Belden Bly	September 29, 1914	
	Frank Edwin Boot	November 8, 1905	
	Everett Murray Bowker	September 17, 1901	
	Gerald Timothy Bowler		
	Gordon Dickson Boynton	August 9, 1901	
	Manassah E. Bradley	September 15, 1900	
	Jeremiah Francis Brennan		
	Daniel Joseph Bresnahan	September 30, 1888	
	John Cornelius Bresnahan	November 14, 1919	
	Clarence B. Brown	December 22, 1877	
	Frank Eben Brown	January 14, 1890	
	John D. Brown	January 30, 1900	
	John Brox	November 16, 1910	
	James J. Bruin	October 31, 1898	
	John A. Burke	March 30, 1910	
	Harland Burke	April 22, 1888	
	Philip Courtland Burr		
	Oscar Josiah Cahoon	April 29, 1912	
	Colin James Cameron	August 24, 1879	
	Eldridge Earl Campbell		
	Harold Wilson Canavan	May 13, 1915	
	William F. Carr	August 4, 1910	
	Daniel Casey	May 7, 1890	
	Francis X. Casey		
	Michael Catino	February 21, 1904	
	Harrison Chadwick	February 25, 1903	
	Wendell Phillips Chamberlain	October 28, 1911	
	Philip Aloysius Chapman		
	Thomas Francis Coady Jr.	May 8, 1905	
	John F. Collins	July 20, 1919	10th Suffolk
	Dana S. Collins		
	J. Everett Collins	April 27, 1894	
	James Francis Condon	February 4, 1899	
	Joseph T. Conley		
	Louis Benedict Connors		
	T. Edward Corbett		
	Leo Joseph Cournoyer	December 11, 1905	
	George Chauncey Cousens	September 20, 1905	
	William A. Cowing	January 6, 1878	
	James J. Craven, Jr.	March 24, 1919	
	Walter A. Cuffe	January 29, 1898	
	Joseph Henry Cullen		
	John G. Curley		
	Sidney Curtiss	September 4, 1917	
	George Walter Dean		
	Ernest DeRoy	July 13, 1889	
	Edward DeSaulnier	January 8, 1921	
	Cornelius Desmond	October 4, 1893	
	Logan Rockwell Dickie	May 4, 1890	
	Vincent B. Dignam	February 22, 1896	
	William T. Dillon Jr.		
	Edmund Dinis	October 4, 1924	
	William P. Di Vitto		
	Thomas J. Doherty	August 25, 1919	
	Francis Clifton Dolan		
	Maurice A. Donahue	September 12, 1918	
	Edmond J. Donlan	December 19, 1899	
	Anthony R. Doyle	August 8, 1895	
	Charles D. Driscoll	June 18, 1888	
	Henry M. Duggan	October 5, 1896	
	Ernest W. Dullea	January 14, 1891	
	Philip J. Durkin	October 21, 1903	
	Thomas Edward Enright	August 1, 1881	
	Andrew E. Faulkner	September 23, 1913	
	Michael Paul Feeney	March 26, 1907	
	Charles E. Ferguson	January 30, 1894	
	John Charles Fiore		
	Maurice Edward Fitzgerald		
	Peter F. Fitzgerald	February 16, 1889	
	John J. Fitzpatrick		
	Norman Eugene Folsom	December 23, 1903	
	Stephen L. French	March 9, 1892	
	George Fuller	July 24, 1893	
	Francis Thomas Gallagher		
	John L. Gallant		
	Peter B. Gay	July 13, 1915	
	Charles Gibbons	July 21, 1901	
	Frank S. Giles	June 15, 1915	
	Avery W. Gilkerson	June 5, 1899	
	Louis Harry Glaser	June 15, 1910	
	William A. Glynn		
	Hollis M. Gott	May 25, 1885	
	Joseph Patrick Graham	August 22, 1902	
	Thomas T. Gray	July 22, 1892	
	George Greene	March 7, 1897	
	Frederick C. Haigis	May 10, 1903	
	Frederick Clement Hailer Jr.		
	James Edward Hannon		
	Francis Appleton Harding	1908	
	Fred C. Harrington	April 21, 1902	
	William E. Hays	November 28, 1903	
	Charles W. Hedges	March 27, 1901	
	James Alan Hodder		
	Charles F. Holman	June 21, 1892	
	J. Philip Howard	February 16, 1907	
	Richard Lester Hull	November 30, 1917	
	Nathaniel M. Hurwitz	March 24, 1893	
	Fred A. Hutchinson	April 5, 1881	
	William Whittem Jenness	April 3, 1904	
	Adolph Johnson	July 20, 1885	
	Ernest A. Johnson	March 13, 1897	
	Stanley Everett Johnson	October 4, 1911	
	Allan Francis Jones	June 29, 1921	
	Peter John Jordan	July 23, 1910	
	Francis Xavier Joyce		
	Charles Kaplan	September 26, 1895	
	Clarence Karelitz		
	Warren Charles Karner		
	Henry E. Keenan		
	Alfred B. Keith	November 26, 1893	
	Francis Joseph Kelley	March 21, 1890	
	Thomas E. Key		
	Cornelius F. Kiernan	August 15, 1917	
	Philip Kimball	June 6, 1918	
	Bernard M. Lally		
	Edmund Vincent Lane	August 31, 1893	
	Joseph F. Leahy		
	Francis W. Lindstrom	December 18, 1898	
	Louis Lobel	August 10, 1911	
	Gerald P. Lombard	January 4, 1916	
	William Longworth	August 17, 1914	
	Raymond Joseph Lord		
	C. Gerald Lucey	September 8, 1913	
	John F. Lynch	January 26, 1890	
	John Pierce Lynch	April 19, 1924	
	Arthur Ulton Mahan	June 18, 1900	
	Vincent Ambrose Mannering	July 11, 1912	
	Philip M. Markley	March 28, 1897	
	George Francis Martin Jr.		
	Michael J. McCarthy (politician)	October 23, 1890	
	Frank D. McCarthy		
	Paul Andrew McCarthy	December 23, 1902	
	Joseph F. McEvoy Jr.	April 27, 1918	
	Timothy J. McInerney		
	Francis H. McNamara		
	William E. McNamara		
	Joseph A. Milano	April 8, 1883	
	Sherman Miles	December 5, 1882	
	Arthur William Milne	March 28, 1908	
	Wilfred S. Mirsky	September 14, 1906	
	Charles A. Mullaly Jr.	September 28, 1910	
	Edward J. Mulligan	February 8, 1907	
	Robert F. Murphy (politician)	January 24, 1899	
	Cornelius Joseph Murray	August 19, 1890	
	Harold Clinton Nagle	July 27, 1917	
	Louis K. Nathanson		
	James Anthony O'Brien	October 27, 1886	
	William Thomas O'Brien	December 2, 1889	
	John Henry O'Connor Jr.	December 9, 1917	
	James O'Dea Jr.	August 25, 1922	
	George Henry O'Farrell	November 15, 1910	
	Louis F. O'Keefe	June 12, 1895	
	Tip O'Neill	December 9, 1912	
	John J. O'Rourke	June 26, 1916	
	Frank B. Oliveira		
	Harold A. Palmer	October 15, 1906	
	Raymond P. Palmer	December 27, 1895	
	Anthony Parenzo		
	Eben Parsons		
	Clark Brownson Partridge	August 26, 1878	
	Charles Louis Patrone	March 17, 1914	
	Antone Perreira		
	Michael P. Pessolano		
	Henry W. Pickford		
	Gabriel Piemonte	January 28, 1909	
	Patrick Francis Plunkett	March 21, 1917	
	George William Porter	November 6, 1885	
	Harvey Armand Pothier	September 6, 1901	
	Meyer Pressman	February 11, 1907	
	Harold Putnam (Massachusetts politician)	February 15, 1916	
	Andrew P. Quigley	January 13, 1926	
	Philip Andrew Quinn	February 21, 1910	
	George E. Rawson	December 6, 1886	
	Thomas Francis Reilly	August 12, 1903	
	Hibbard Richter	April 12, 1899	
	Joseph N. Roach	March 22, 1883	
	Albert E. Roberts	November 22, 1875	
	Daniel Rudsten		
	Richard August Ruether	August 28, 1896	
	Howard S. Russell	July 28, 1887	
	Kendall Ainsworth Sanderson		
	William Henry Sears Jr.	July 14, 1875	
	A. John Serino	March 13, 1906	
	John M. Shea	December 8, 1902	
	Arthur Joseph Sheehan	March 16, 1897	
	Robert T. Sisson	February 21, 1881	
	Michael F. Skerry	January 3, 1909	
	Charles J. Skladzien		
	Roy C. Smith	January 28, 1890	
	H. Edward Snow	April 25, 1914	
	Margaret Spear	August 10, 1882	
	Jeremiah Joseph Sullivan	March 9, 1905	
	Ralph Warren Sullivan		
	William F. Sullivan	August 26, 1905	
	Joseph A. Sylvia Jr.	September 16, 1903	
	Edmond Talbot Jr.	June 1, 1898	
	Clarence F. Telford		
	John F. Thompson (politician)	May 20, 1920	
	Nathaniel Tilden	November 3, 1903	
	Robert Xavier Tivnan	June 9, 1924	
	Harold Tompkins	August 23, 1887	
	John Joseph Toomey	March 25, 1909	
	James Joseph Twohig Jr.	May 2, 1908	
	Earle Stanley Tyler	December 18, 1896	
	Mario Umana	May 5, 1914	
	Theodore Jack Vaitses	May 8, 1901	
	John W. Vaughan	March 20, 1878	
	William X. Wall	July 1, 1904	
	Joseph Francis Walsh	February 9, 1907	
	Joseph D. Ward	March 26, 1914	
	John Cummings Webster Jr.		
	Norman F. Wellen		
	Malcolm Stuart White		
	Howard J. Whitmore Jr.	May 9, 1905	
	John S. Whittemore		
	Henry D. Winslow	September 24, 1910	
	Stanislaus George Wondolowski	August 20, 1909	
	Albert E. Wood		
	Lawrence Theodore Woolfenden		
	Alton Hamilton Worrall	April 20, 1893	
	Arthur Eaton Young		

== See also ==
- 81st United States Congress
- List of Massachusetts General Courts
