= Andrew G. Pierce =

American politician

Andrew Granville Pierce
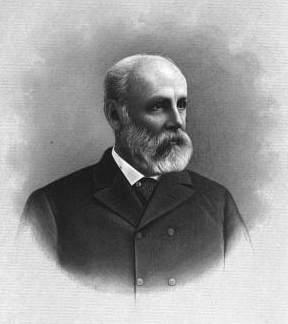

10th Mayor of New Bedford, Massachusetts
- In office January 6, 1868 – 1869
- Preceded by: John H. Perry
- Succeeded by: George L. Richmond

Alderman of the City of New Bedford, Massachusetts

Personal details
- Born: August 9, 1829; New Bedford, Massachusetts
- Died: September 11, 1903
- Spouse(s): Caroline Lincoln Hillman, m. July 17, 1854.
- Profession: Textile manufacturer
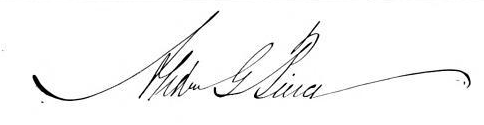
- Signature

Andrew Granville Pierce (August 9, 1829 - September 11, 1903) was an American businessman and politician who served as Mayor of New Bedford, Massachusetts.

Pierce was born in New Bedford, Massachusetts on August 9, 1829.

Pierce married Caroline Lincoln Hillman on July 17, 1854.

Pierce died on September 11, 1903.

== Notes ==
Business positions
Preceded by Joseph Grinnell	President of the Wamsutta Textile Mills	Succeeded by William W. Crapo
Political offices
Preceded by John H. Perry	10th Mayor of New Bedford, Massachusetts; 1869-1869	Succeeded by George L. Richmond
