= James J. Craven Jr. =

American politician

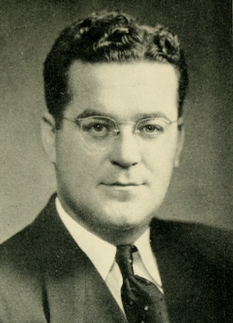
James Craven, circa 1961

James J. Craven Jr. (March 24, 1919 – June 6, 1991) was a member of the Massachusetts House of Representatives from the 12th Suffolk District (includes parts of Roxbury, Jamaica Plain and Roslindale) starting in 1957. Craven was found guilty the state's conflict-of-interest law (Sections 2(b), 6, and 23(d) of Massachusetts General Laws Chapter 268A). Upon appeal, the Massachusetts Supreme Judicial Court (SJC) affirmed they lower court’s decision in Craven’s case against the State Ethics Commission.

Craven, a resident of Jamaica Plain, was unseated in the November 1984 elections. Two major reasons he lost the election was the conflict of interest finding discussed below but also a December 1983 House reprimand for violating the legislature's code of ethics. After he lost the election, he had been named to a $55,000 staff job with the House Rules Committee by former speaker Thomas W. McGee. Even though he had only been in the position a few days, it allowed his pension to be increased by $18,000 per annum. House Speaker George Keverian blocked the increase.

He is also known for playing a lead role in the Doyle-Flynn Bill, passed in 1978, which prohibited using Medicaid funds being used for abortions, until it was overturned in 1981.

== Legal troubles ==
Craven’s legal issues while a state representative arise from his being a member of the House Ways and Means Committee. In 1976, Craven helped form the Jamaica Plain Community Development Foundation, Inc. (JPCDF). Incorporated in 1977, the first Executive Director was Cornelius Joseph Doyle. Doyle had worked with the Massachusetts House of Representatives Rules Committee and had been assigned to Craven. Craven assisted JPCDF get several grants and contracts with various Massachusetts governmental agencies and City of Boston contracts.

Further, Craven and four of his brothers had formed Celtic Realty Trust and all five were named beneficiaries of the Trust. Albert Buchwald and John Lawless, who were President and a Director of JPCDF at the time, were named as Trustees of the Trust. In May 1977, the Trust bought the Minton Building in Jamaica Plain. At the same time, Craven “assigned his 20 percent beneficial interest in the Celtic Realty Trust to his daughter, Theresa.” When a grant came through, which Craven had facilitated, part of the grant money was used to rent office space in the Minton Building.

== Personal life ==
Craven graduated from English High School and attended Boston University.

== See also ==
- 1949–1950 Massachusetts legislature
