= Stephen Canessa =

American politician

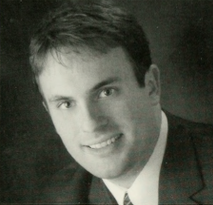
Image of Stephen R. Canessa

Stephen R. Canessa (born 1980) was a member of the Massachusetts House of Representatives, representing the 12th Bristol District. He resigned to accept the position of executive director for government affairs at the Southcoast Health Systems. He is a member of the United States Democratic Party.

Rep. Canessa's district includes East Freetown, Lakeville, Middleborough, East Taunton, and New Bedford, Massachusetts. He is a graduate of Apponequet Regional High School and Bridgewater State College, and completed his MBA at Suffolk University. Prior to being elected to the house in 2004, he was a member of the Lakeville School Committee from 2001 - 2004.

== Legislation and Positions ==
=== Anti-Gang Bill ===
In January 2006, in response to gang violence and witness intimidation in his district and across the state, Rep. Canessa co-sponsored a bill with Senator Jarrett Barrios, entitled "An Act to Reduce Gang Violence in the Commonwealth," that would establish a witness protection program to encourage witnesses to come forward and to testify accurately. It passed unanimously in the Senate, was approved in the House with 151 yeas to 2 nays and was signed into law by Gov. Mitt Romney shortly thereafter.

==== Provisions ====
The bill, publicized mainly for the establishment of a witness protection program, included the following provisions:

- Establishes a statewide witness protection program,
- Increases punishment for illegal firearm possession, and for the possession of a loaded firearm by individuals who violate certain aspects of the bill
- Allows judges to prevent the defense from obtaining grand jury witness statements, providing that "there is a reason to believe...that the defendant poses a threat to a witness or victim"
- Allows restrictions on communication with witnesses by the accused
- Increases punishment for witness intimidation
- Lessens the requirements for a perjury conviction

==== Support ====
Proponents tout the bill as a welcome and needed step toward reducing witness intimidation, especially by gang members awaiting trial. Family members of gang violence victims praised the bill, and many were present at the Massachusetts State House for its passage into law.

==== Opposition ====
The ACLU and the Massachusetts Association of Criminal Defense Lawyers opposed sections of the bill that allow judges to bar defendants from seeing grand jury witness statements, and that reduce the requirements for a perjury conviction. Specifically, they point to a possible conflict with the 6th Amendment, which states in part:

In all criminal prosecutions, the accused shall enjoy the right...to be confronted with the witnesses against him...

It is the subject of continuing debate whether sections of the bill violate this Amendment.

=== Southcoast Commuter Rail ===
Rep. Canessa has expressed support for the expansion of the MBTA Commuter Rail into the Southcoast area including New Bedford, which is part of the district he represents. The federal Transportation Equity Act of 2005 set aside $20 million for the project, and in August of that year, Canessa joined area senators and representatives in urging Governor Romney to "make this project a legitimate, top priority."

=== Invasive Weeds ===
Long Pond and other water supplies in towns across Canessa's district have recently been noted as being overrun by invasive weeds such as milfoil. In 2005, acknowledging that these weeds can pose a risk to the environment and to the towns' drinking water, he supported studies into the weeds and their impact.

== Electoral history ==
- 2006 Race for 12th Bristol Representative, Massachusetts House (General Election)
  - Stephen R. Canessa (D), 69%
  - Mark A. Howland (I), 31%
- 2004 Race for 12th Bristol Representative, Massachusetts House (Democratic Primary Election)
  - Stephen R. Canessa (D), 45%
  - Mark A. Howland (D), 35%
  - George Rogers (D), 20%

Political offices
Preceded by Mark A. Howland	12th Bristol District Representative; January 5, 2005 - June 27, 2011	Succeeded by Keiko Orrall
