= John Marshall Eaton Jr. =

Massachusetts politician (1918–1997)

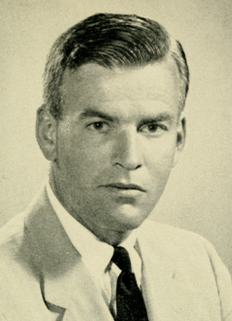

Member of the Massachusetts House of Representatives from the 13th Middlesex district
- In office 1955–1964

Personal details
- Born: March 26, 1918 Boston, Massachusetts, US
- Died: April 18, 1997 (aged 79) Concord, Massachusetts, US
- Education: Harvard College (BA); Boston University School of Law (LLB)

John Marshall Eaton Jr. (March 26, 1918– April 18, 1997) was an American politician who was the member of the Massachusetts House of Representatives from the 13th Middlesex district.
