= Otis M. Whitney =

American politician, jurist and military officer (1909-1982)

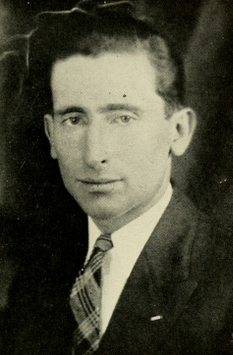

Massachusetts Insurance Commissioner
- In office 1959–1962
- Preceded by: Joseph A. Humphreys
- Succeeded by: C. Eugene Farnam

Massachusetts Commissioner of Public Safety
- In office 1953–1959
- Preceded by: Daniel I. Murphy
- Succeeded by: J. Henry Goguen

Member of the Massachusetts Governor's Council for the 3rd District
- In office 1946–1953
- Preceded by: Carl A. Sheridan
- Succeeded by: David B. Williams

Member of the Massachusetts House of Representatives for the 13th Middlesex District
- In office 1937–1943
- Preceded by: George G. Tarbell
- Succeeded by: Harold Tompkins

Personal details
- Born: March 25, 1909 Concord, Massachusetts
- Died: July 5, 1982 (aged 73) South Pasadena, Florida
- Resting place: Sleepy Hollow Cemetery; Concord, Massachusetts
- Party: Republican
- Education: Harvard College; Harvard Law School
- Awards: Silver Star

Military service
- Allegiance: United States
- Branch/service: Massachusetts National Guard
- Years of service: 1933–1962
- Rank: Major General
- Battles/wars: Battle of Guadalcanal

Otis Minot Whitney (March 25, 1909 – July 5, 1982) was an American politician, jurist, and military officer who served as Massachusetts Commissioner of Public Safety and was a commander of the Massachusetts National Guard's Yankee Division.

== Early life ==
Whitney was born on March 25, 1909, in Concord, Massachusetts. He graduated from Browne & Nichols School and enrolled in Harvard College. While there he joined the National Guard. He graduated cum laude in 1930 and went on to graduate from Harvard Law School in 1933. While in law school he president of the Concord Republican Town Committee and helped found the Young Republicans. After law school he joined the law office of Parkman, Robbins, Coughlin and Hannan.

== Political career ==
From 1937 to 1943, Whitney represented the 13th Middlesex District in the Massachusetts House of Representatives.

Following Whitney's discharge from the Army, the Massachusetts General Court appointed Whitney to a vacant seat on the Massachusetts Governor's Council.

In 1953, Whitney was appointed Commissioner of Public Safety. In 1955, Whitney combined his roles as Commissioner of Public Safety and assistant commander of the Yankee Division during a riot at the Charlestown State Prison. He ordered that a National Guard tank be brought to break down the prison doors as a show of strength. The tank, however, got stuck on the Prison Point Bridge. The riot ended after 85 hours.

In 1959, Democratic Governor Foster Furcolo replaced Whitney as Public Safety Commissioner. Furcolo however appointed Whitney to the position of state insurance commissioner. Whitney's appointment was opposed on political grounds by Lieutenant Governor Robert F. Murphy, who stated that "with 850,000 registered Democrats in Massachusetts, it is unthinkable that there isn't a qualified Democrat to hold down any office". Whitney's was confirmed by the Massachusetts Governor's Council on a 6 to 3 vote.

A labor dispute between the Metropolitan Transit Authority and Carmen's Union led the Massachusetts General Court to approve Governor John A. Volpe's request for emergency control of the M.T.A. Volpe chose Whitney to manage the M.T.A. for the 45-day emergency period that began on April 1, 1962.

Later that year, Volpe appointed Whitney presiding justice of the Concord District Court. He was sworn in on September 14, 1962.

== Military career ==
During World War II, Whitney led a unit of the United States Army's Americal Division during the Guadalcanal Campaign. He was awarded the Silver Star for gallantry in action. In 1944, Whitney was stricken with malaria and sent back to the United States, where he promoted to the rank of colonel and given command of the general staff school at Fort Leavenworth. He was discharged from the Army in 1946.

In 1951, Whitney was promoted to brigadier general and appointed assistant commander of the Yankee Division. On November 13, 1957, he became a major general and was put in command of the division. He retired from the National Guard on November 14, 1962.

== Later life ==
On February 29, 1968, Whitney retired from the Concord District Court for "purely personal reasons". He then moved to St. Petersburg, Florida, and after passing the Florida bar resumed the practice law. He served as chairman of the Planning and Zoning Board of St. Petersburg Beach, was a member of the Pinellas County Republican Executive Committee, and was a delegate to the 1976 Republican National Convention.

Whitney died on July 5, 1982, at the Palms of Pasadena Hospital in South Pasadena, Florida.

== See also ==
- 1937–1938 Massachusetts legislature
- 1939 Massachusetts legislature
- 1941–1942 Massachusetts legislature

Military offices
Preceded by Reginald A. Maurer	Commanding General, 26th Infantry Division; 1957–1962	Succeeded by Richard J. Quigley
