= Jacinto F. Diniz =

American politician and businessman

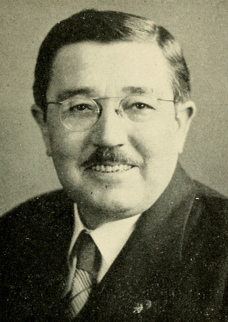
- Jacinto F. Diniz

Member of the Massachusetts House of Representatives from the 8th Bristol District
- In office 1943–1949
- Preceded by: John M. Cawley
- Succeeded by: Edmund Dinis

Personal details
- Born: October 3, 1888 São Miguel Island, Azores
- Died: October 6, 1949 (aged 61) New Bedford, Massachusetts, US

Jacinto F. "Jesse" Diniz (also Dinis) (October 3, 1888 – October 6, 1949) was a Portuguese-born American politician and businessman.

Born in São Miguel Island, Azores, Diniz and his family emigranted to the United States and settled in New Bedford, Massachusetts. He attended public school in New Bedford, Massachusetts as well as Fisher Business College and Bryant & Stratton College. Diniz served in the United States Army during World War I and was awarded the Purple Heart. He was in the furniture and insurance business and also served a deputy sheriff for Bristol County, Massachusetts. Diniz served in the Massachusetts House of Representatives from 1943 to 1949. During his tenure in the House, Diniz was twice ejected for controversial remarks, but was allowed to return after apologizing. In 1947 and 1948 he was Democratic nominee for the Massachusetts's 9th congressional district seat, but lost to Donald W. Nicholson. Diniz died from a heart attack in New Bedford, Massachusetts while giving a speech at a political event; he was campaigning for the office of city assessor for New Bedford. He was buried in Arlington National Cemetery. His son Edmund Dinis also served in the Massachusetts General Court.

== See also ==
- Massachusetts legislature: 1943–1944, 1945–1946, 1947–1948
