= Samuel D. McLeod =

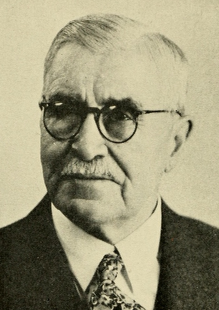
- McLeod, circa 1945

Member of the Massachusetts House of Representatives from the 7th Bristol district
- In office January 3, 1945 – January 5, 1949

Personal details
- Born: December 12, 1867 Prince Edward Island, Canada
- Died: May 11, 1951 (aged 83) New Bedford, Massachusetts
- Party: Republican

Samuel D. McLeod (December 12, 1867 – May 11, 1951) was a Canadian-American police officer and politician. He served in the Massachusetts House of Representatives from 1945 to 1949.

== Biography ==
McLeod was born in Prince Edward Island, Canada, on December 12, 1867. He moved to New Bedford, Massachusetts at an early age.

McLeod first joined the New Bedford Police Department on December 27, 1894, when he was appointed by mayor Stephen Brownell to serve as a patrolman. He was appointed a lieutenant on July 7, 1915, and later became a captain on December 19, 1921.

Following the resignation of chief of police Edward Doherty, McLeod became the acting chief of police on January 28, 1926. A civil service test was administered to determine who should fill the vacancy, and McLeod scored the highest out of five candidates. He was initially offered the role of chief of police, but he declined due to an ongoing change in the city's leadership following the mayoral election. McLeod instead remained Deputy Chief, with William T. Cole being appointed as chief of police. Cole died in May 1928, and McLeod was appointed chief of police on May 16, 1928, a position he held until his retirement in 1942.

After retiring from the police department, McLeod was elected city councilor of New Bedford in 1942. In 1944, he was elected to the Massachusetts House of Representatives as one of two representatives from the 7th Bristol district, and was re-elected in 1946.

In 1948, McLeod ran for re-election in the Massachusetts House, for what would have been his third term. Voting took place on November 2, 1948. Initially, the winners were reported to be McLeod and Democrat Joseph Sylvia Jr., with McLeod coming in second place and narrowly beating fellow Republican incumbent L. Theodore Woolfenden by 83 votes. However, a recount on November 19 showed that McLeod had actually come in third, losing second place to Woolfenden by 28 votes.

McLeod died on May 11, 1951, after being hospitalized at St. Luke's Hospital for an unspecified illness. He was 83.
