= List of 1960s American state and local politicians convicted of crimes =

This list includes American politicians at the state and local levels who have been convicted of felony crimes committed while in office by decade; this list encompasses the 1960s.

At the bottom of the article are links to related articles which deal with politicians who are involved in federal scandals (political and sexual), as well as differentiating among federal, state and local convictions. Also excluded are crimes which occur outside the politician's tenure in office unless they specifically stem from acts during his time of service.

Entries are arranged by date, from most current to less recent, and by state.

== Alabama ==
- Attorney General of Alabama Richmond Flowers, Sr. (D) In 1969, Flowers was sentenced to eight years in prison for conspiring to extort payments from companies.

== California ==
=== Local ===
- Mayor of Oakland John C. Houlihan (R) was sent to prison for more than two years after pleading guilty to stealing nearly $100,000 from an estate he was handling as an attorney. (1966)

== Maryland ==
- State Delegate A. Gordon Boone (D) served 13 months in federal prison after his conviction on charges of mail fraud in connection with the state's savings and loan scandal. (1967)

== Massachusetts ==
- Governor's Councilors Joseph Ray Crimmins (D) and Raymond F. Sullivan (D) and former councilors Michael Favulli (D) and Ernest C. Stasiun (D) were found guilty of conspiracy for requesting bribes from Governor Foster Furcolo in exchange for their votes in favor of reappointing state public works commissioner Anthony N. DiNatale. (1965)

== Michigan ==
=== Local ===
- Mayor of Detroit Louis Miriani (R) convicted of tax evasion. (1969)

== New Jersey ==
- State Senator Jerome Epstein (R) was found guilty and sentenced to nine years for stealing fuel oil, worth $4 million. (1968)

== New York ==
- State Assemblyman Hyman E. Mintz (R) was convicted of bribery and perjury charges for trying to get insider information on a grand jury probe of the Finger Lakes Race Track. Mintz was sentenced to one year in prison. (1965)
- State Assemblyman Stanley J. Bauer (R) pleaded guilty to one count of tax evasion and was fined $5,000. (1962)

== Oklahoma ==
- Associate Justice of the Oklahoma Supreme Court N. S. Corn (D) accepted bribes of $150K delivered in $100 bills in an armored car and was sentenced to 18 months in prison. (1964)

=== Local ===
- former Mayor of Oklahoma City O. A. Cargill was convicted of perjury. (1965)

== See also ==
- List of federal political scandals in the United States
- List of federal political sex scandals in the United States

Federal politicians:

- List of American federal politicians convicted of crimes
- List of United States representatives expelled, censured, or reprimanded
- List of United States senators expelled or censured
