= Wrightsman =

Wrightsman is an English surname. Notable people with the surname include:

- Charles Bierer Wrightsman (1895–1986), American oil executive and art collector
- Jayne Wrightsman (1919–2019), American philanthropist and art collector
- Stan Wrightsman (1910–1975), American jazz pianist
