= Fairview Cemetery (Dalton, Massachusetts) =

Historic cemetery in Massachusetts, United States

- U.S. National Register of Historic Places
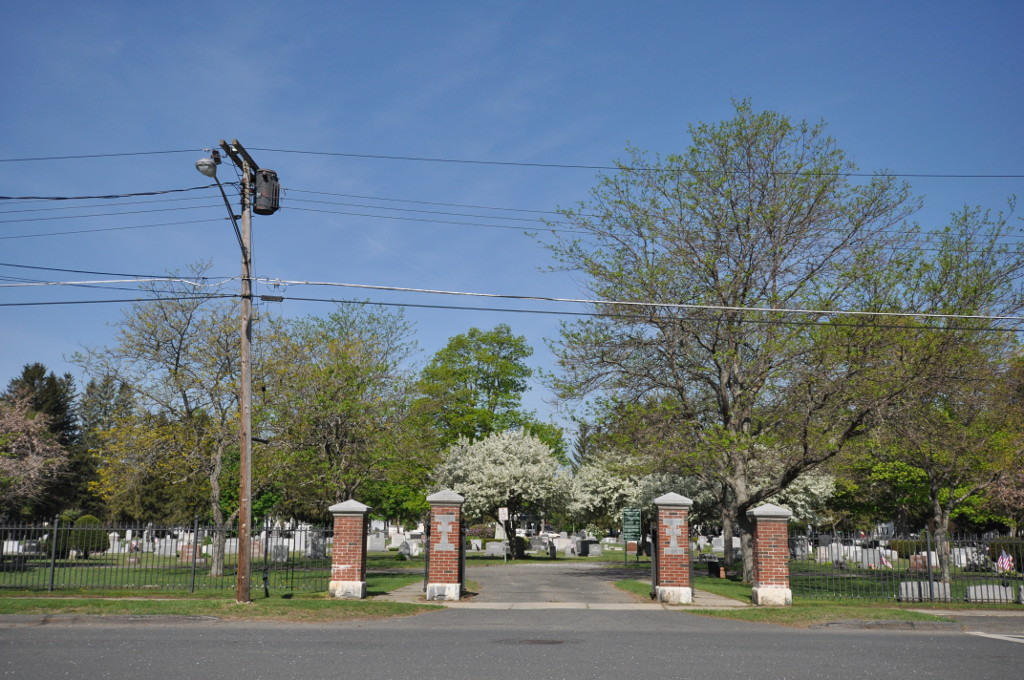

- Location within Massachusetts Location within the United States
- Location: Dalton, Massachusetts
- Coordinates: 42°28′37″N 73°10′21″W
- Built: 1885
- Architect: Dwyer, D.W. (gateposts); Anchor Iron Works
- NRHP reference No.: 00000483
- Added to NRHP: May 11, 2000

Fairview Cemetery is a historic cemetery on Curtis Avenue in Dalton, Massachusetts. Established in 1885, the cemetery became the resting ground for many of Dalton's heavily Irish Catholic working class, and is stylistically reflective of changing trends in burial practices away from the rural cemetery movement of the mid-19th century. The cemetery, still in active use, was listed on the National Register of Historic Places in 2000.

== Description and history ==
Fairview Cemetery is located in a residential area north of Dalton's Main Street, and consists of about 6.3 acres (2.5 ha), bounded by Warren Avenue on the west, Washington Street on the north, and Curtis Avenue on the east, with residences lining John Street to the south. It has the same number of plots as the larger (10-acre) Main Street Cemetery. The street side of the cemetery, facing Curtis Street, is lined with wrought iron fencing, and features a main gate with granite gateposts. The remaining sides of the cemetery are closed off from the surrounding neighborhood by chain link fencing. The grounds of the cemetery were designed in the fashionable rural cemetery style, with winding paths and mature plantings, although the density of plots is somewhat higher than typical. Most of the grave markers are modest in scope and scale. The cemetery continues in active use.

Dalton's Catholic population grew in the mid-19th century with an influx of Irish immigrants, who worked mainly as farmers and laborers. By 1861 a mission church had been established, and St. Agnes was established as its first permanent congregation in 1881. The church leadership also sought to establish a cemetery dedicated to Catholics, their burials taking place in the Main Street Cemetery prior to the founding of Fairview. The cemetery was actually established by the town, which established a committee of trustees for it in 1885. The land was bought from the Carson & Brown Company in 1885, after a planned division of the Main Street Cemetery and acquisition of adjacent lands fell through.

== See also ==
- Main Street Cemetery
- East Main Street Cemetery
- National Register of Historic Places listings in Berkshire County, Massachusetts
