= Josephine B. Crane =

American socialite and patron of the arts

Josephine Crane
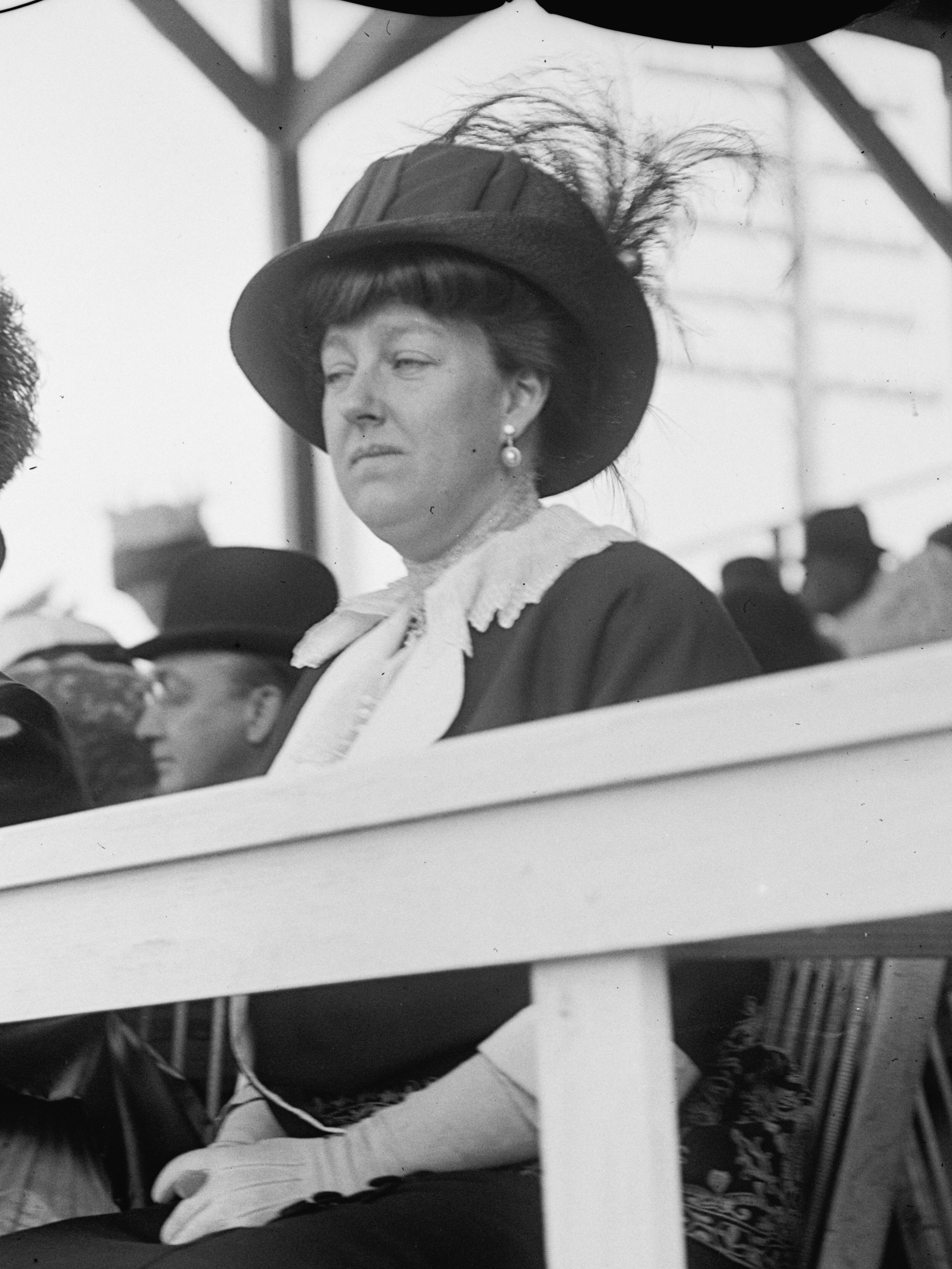
- Crane in 1911

Personal details
- Born: Josephine Porter Boardman; November 14, 1873 Cleveland, Ohio, US
- Died: July 8, 1972 (aged 98) Falmouth, Massachusetts, US
- Spouse: Winthrop Murray Crane (m. 1906; died 1920)
- Relations: Mabel Thorp Boardman (sister)
- Children: Stephen Crane; Bruce Crane; Louise Crane

Josephine Porter Boardman Crane (née Josephine Porter Boardman) (November 14, 1873 – July 8, 1972) was an American socialite and patron of the arts, co-founder and original trustee of the Museum of Modern Art and supporter of the Dalton School of New York City.

== Personal life ==
Born Josephine Porter Boardman, in Cleveland, Ohio, she was from a well-to-do family. She was a daughter of Florence (née Sheffield) Boardman and William Jarvis Boardman, a lawyer and political activist. She had five siblings, including Mabel Thorp Boardman, William Henry Boardman, Florence Sheffield Keefe, and Elijah George Boardman. Her family moved from Ohio to Washington, D.C. around 1887, although they maintained connections to Ohio politics including a friendship with the Taft family. In fact, "when they came to Washington shortly before the Taft inauguration, Mr. and Mrs. Taft were house guests of Mr. and Mrs. Boardman."

Her father was the grandson of United States Senator Elijah Boardman. Her mother was the granddaughter of Joseph Earl Sheffield, a major benefactor of Yale University.

== Philanthropy and interests ==
In 1908, Crane founded the Congressional Club. After her husband's death, she moved to New York City, where she was among the founders of the Museum of Modern Art and was elected to the board of trustees in October 1929. She was also on the boards of the Morgan Library (as a founding trustee) and the New York Public Library. In 1921, she established the Berkshire Museum's Junior Naturalists. She was a member of the Berkshire Museum board of trustees from 1937 until her death. She was also a trustee of the Metropolitan Museum of Art.

Crane was the benefactress and founding trustee of the Dalton School, which took its name from the location of the Crane family estate, "Sugar Hill", in Dalton, Massachusetts. She was the original sponsor for implementing the Dalton Plan in 1920, a much-copied experiment in education.

== Personal life ==
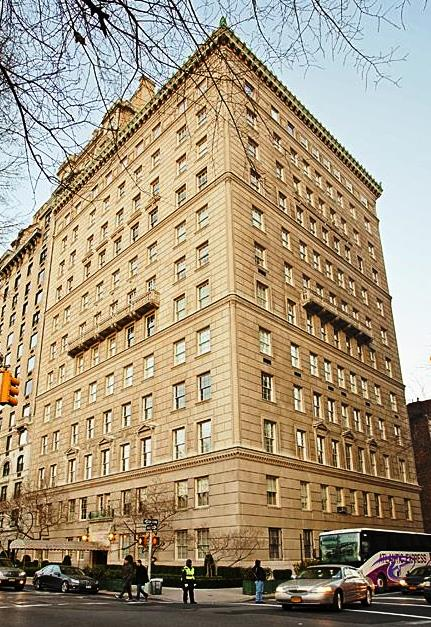
Crane's New York residence at 820 Fifth Avenue

In 1906, she married the American millionaire Winthrop Murray Crane, who was a widow and twenty years her senior. A former Republican Governor of Massachusetts, at the time of their marriage, Crane had been a U.S. Senator since October 1904 and continued to serve until March 1913. From his first marriage to Mary Benner, he had one son, Winthrop Murray Crane Jr. (1881–1968). Together, they were the parents of three children:

- Stephen Crane (1907–1987), who moved to Los Angeles.
- Bruce Crane (1909–1985), who succeeded his elder half-brother as president of Crane & Co. and was a member of the Massachusetts Governor's Council.
- Louise Crane (1911–1997), a poet, publisher, and philanthropist; her partner was Victoria Kent, the Spanish lawyer and republican politician.

Crane hosted a weekly literary salon at her apartment at 820 Fifth Avenue, New York City (an 18-room apartment on the fourth floor of the 12 story limestone-clad luxury coop built in 1916 and designed in the neo-Italian Renaissance palazzo style by Starrett & van Vleck) and at the family home on Penzance Point, Woods Hole, Massachusetts where guests included Marianne Moore and William Somerset Maugham.

Her husband died in Dalton, Massachusetts on October 2, 1920 at sixty-seven years old. A widow for more than fifty years, she died of pneumonia on July 8, 1972, aged 98, at Falmouth Hospital in Falmouth, Massachusetts.

== Published work ==
- Crane, Boardman Josephine. A Middle-West Child New York: Spiral Press (1971)
