= 820 Fifth Avenue =

Housing cooperative in Manhattan, New York

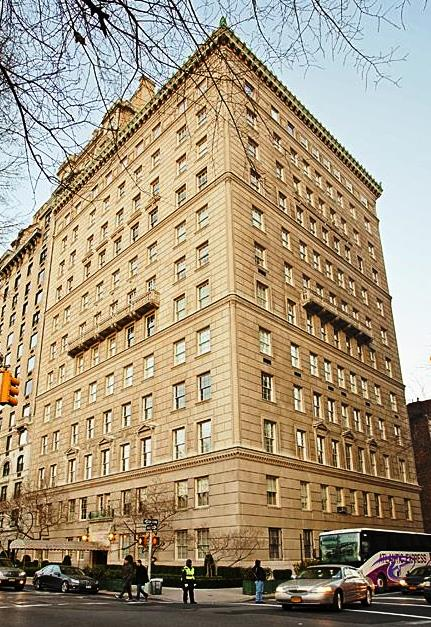
- Building exterior
- Interactive map of the 820 Fifth Avenue area

General information
- Status: Completed
- Type: Residential
- Architectural style: Italian Renaissance
- Location: Corner of Fifth Avenue and East 63rd Street, United States
- Coordinates: 40.7669°N 73.9708°W
- Current tenants: 12 apartments
- Completed: 1916
- Cost: $1.0 million

Technical details
- Floor count: 12

Design and construction
- Architect: Starrett & van Vleck
- Developer: Fred T.Ley

820 Fifth Avenue is a luxury cooperative located at the northeast corner of Fifth Avenue and East 63rd Street on the Upper East Side of Manhattan, New York City, United States.

== Design and apartments ==
The 12 story limestone-clad neo-Italian Renaissance palazzo is one of the most expensive and exclusive apartment houses in the city. It was designed by Starrett & van Vleck and built by Fred T. Ley in 1916. The land upon which it was built was previously occupied by the Progress Club. The frontage was 100.5 feet (30.6 m) on Fifth Avenue and 100 feet (30 m) on 63rd Street. Construction cost was $1 million, exclusive of the land (which cost another million).

The building comprises 12 apartments. There are ten apartments that are full-floor. These apartments are lavish in scale, each containing roughly 6,500 square feet (600 m^{2}). The lower two floors consist of two duplex maisonettes, one 7000 SF, the other 4,500 square feet (420 m^{2}). There is also a superintendent's apartment on the first floor, roughly 750 SF. All apartments feature marble floors, and fireplaces in all major rooms. The outer walls are two and a half feet thick and ceiling height is 11 feet (3.35m). The public rooms all face Central Park, and are accessed via the 44-foot-long gallery. The five bedrooms found in each apartment all have windows on 63rd Street and the numerous (usually seven) (7) servants rooms are in the back.

The facade is broken into five sections by four string courses and the centers of the east and south facades feature balustraded balconies.

== Co-op and amenities ==
Originally a rental, 820 Fifth Avenue was converted into a cooperative in 1949. There are 2 duplex maisonette apartments on the first and second floors, and 10 full-floor apartments on each of floors 3 through 12. Potential buyers must pay entirely in cash. No mortgage financing is allowed. The cooperative board requires potential buyers to possess liquid assets ten times the value of the apartment that they wish to purchase.

The building features a lounge for chauffeurs on the ground floor and a private, gated, holding area in back for cars. Other features include sidewalk landscaping, including Magnolia trees, and a canopied entrance flanked by bronze lanterns.

Amenities include full-time doormen, concierge, elevator operators, laundry and storage rooms in the basement, and storage rooms on the roof which are sometimes used as servants' quarters, as they include baths and small kitchen facilities. Each apartment also has a spacious private wine cellar in the basement, which can accommodate thousands of bottles.

Each of the ten full-floor apartments has three private elevators which open directly into the apartment: a regular passenger elevator, a "party" elevator for moving groups of guests in and out quickly, and a larger cargo "service" elevator that opens into the Servants Hall. The service elevator is for moving furniture, luggage, package and flower deliveries, groceries and catering supplies, and for domestic servants, who are not permitted to use the regular passenger elevator.

820 Fifth Avenue has been known to reject very wealthy prospective buyers, including some billionaires. On the rare occasion that the building's apartments are sold, the sale price can exceed $40 million.

== Notable residents ==
These include both current and former residents:

- William Acquavella (President of Acquavella Galleries, and Donna Acquavella)
- Louise Crane (Crane & Co. stationary heiress) and her companion Victoria Kent
- Michel David-Weill (former director and descendant of the founders of Lazard Frères & Co.) & Hélène David-Weill (art patron and president of the board of trustees of the French association Les Arts décoratifs
- Robert Goelet
- Kenneth C. Griffin
- Anna M. Harkness (Widow of Stephen V. Harkness, founding investor in Standard Oil)
- Tommy Hilfiger
- Ara Hovnanian & Rachel Hovnanian (Real Estate development)
- Arthur Murray and Kathryn Murray
- Stavros Niarchos (Greek shipping magnate)
- Babe Paley and William S. Paley (President of CBS)
- Lily Safra
- Terry Semel and Jane Semel (Former CEO of Yahoo)
- Alfred P. Sloan Jr. (chairman of General Motors)
- Governor Alfred E. Smith
- John North Willys (American automotive pioneer and statesman
- Jayne Wrightsman (widow of the oil baron Charles Wrightsman)
- Armand G. Erpf (partner at Loeb, Rhoades & Co. and chairman of Crowell-Collier Publishing Company)
- Katharine Graham publisher of The Washington Post.
