= 1950 Massachusetts gubernatorial election =

- November 7, 1950
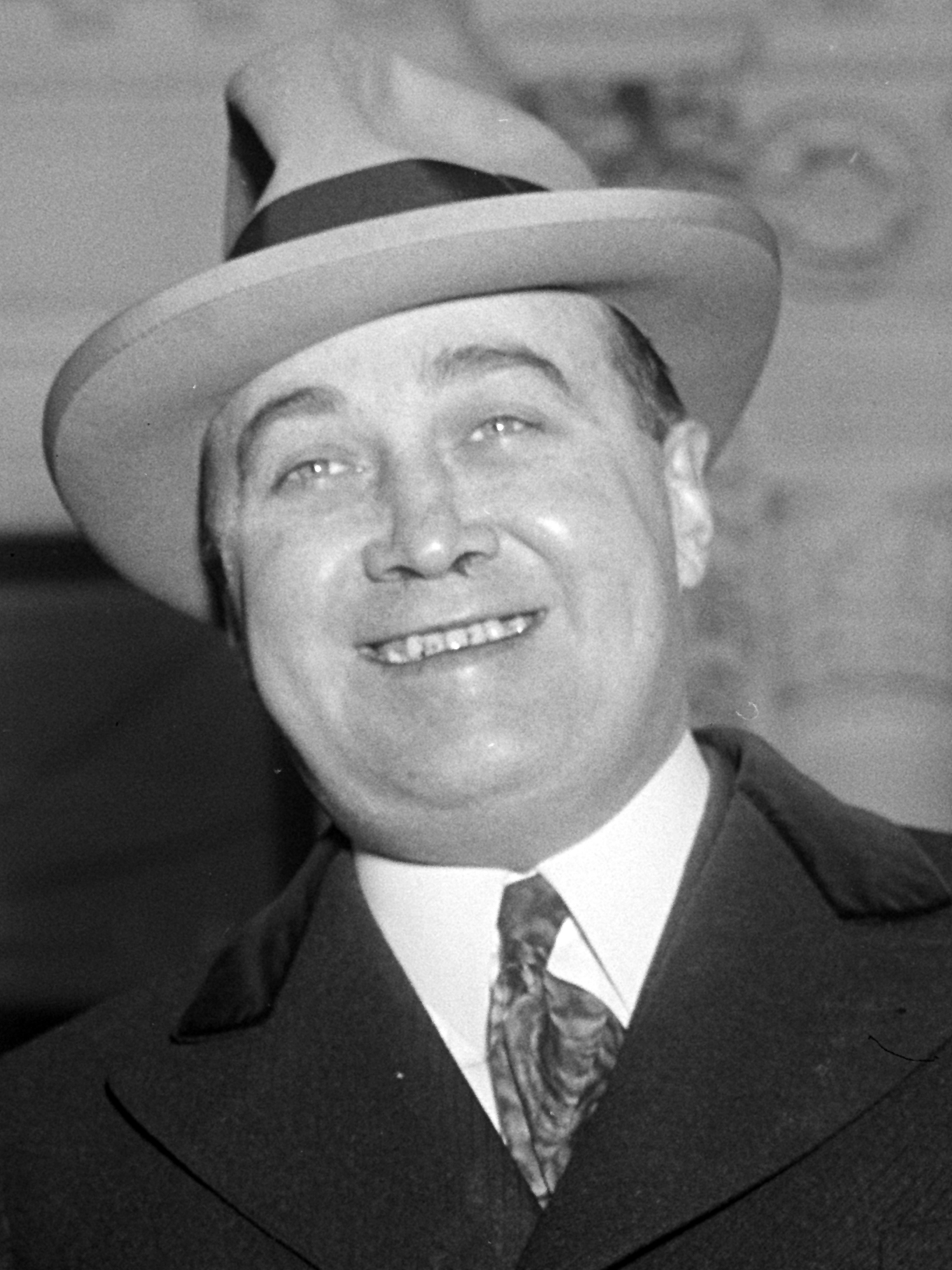

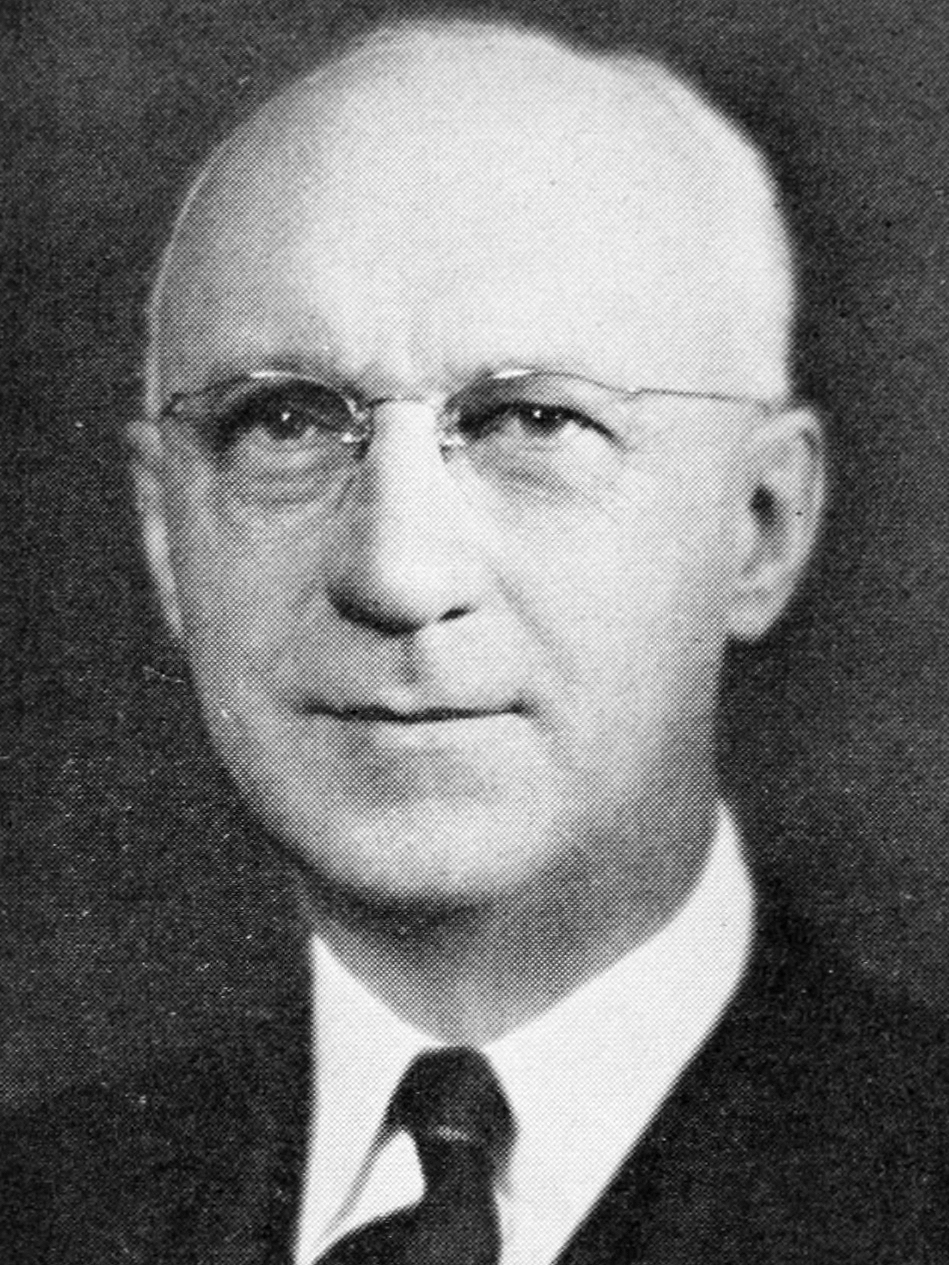
Nominee	Paul A. Dever	Arthur W. Coolidge
Party	Democratic	Republican
Popular vote	1,074,570	824,069
Percentage	56.26%	43.14%
- Dever: 40–50% 50–60% 60–70% 70–80% 80–90% Coolidge: 40–50% 50–60% 60–70% 70–80% 80–90%
Governor before election
Paul A. Dever
Democratic
Elected Governor
Paul A. Dever
Democratic

The 1950 Massachusetts gubernatorial election was held on November 7, 1950. Democratic incumbent Paul A. Dever defeated Republican Arthur W. Coolidge, Socialist Labor candidate Horace Hillis, and Prohibition candidate Mark R. Shaw.

== Democratic primary ==
Paul Dever ran unopposed for the Democratic gubernatorial nomination.

== Republican primary ==
=== Candidates ===
- Clarence A. Barnes, former Massachusetts attorney general
- Arthur W. Coolidge, former lieutenant governor
- Louis E. Denfeld, U.S. Navy admiral
- Frankland W. L. Miles, justice of the Roxbury District Court
- Daniel Needham, former commander of the Massachusetts National Guard and Public Safety commissioner
- Edward Rowe, former state senator from Cambridge

=== Results ===
1950 Republican gubernatorial primary
Party	Candidate	Votes	%
Republican	Arthur W. Coolidge	130,061	35.79%
Republican	Louis E. Denfeld	68,560	18.87%
Republican	Clarence A. Barnes	60,927	16.77%
Republican	Daniel Needham	57,773	15.90%
Republican	Frankland W. L. Miles	37,452	10.31%
Republican	Edward Rowe	8,609	2.37%
Total votes		363,382	100.00%

== General election ==
=== Results ===
Massachusetts gubernatorial election, 1950
Party	Candidate	Votes	%	±%
Democratic	Paul A. Dever (incumbent)	1,074,570	56.26%	
Republican	Arthur W. Coolidge	824,069	43.14%	
Socialist Labor	Horace Hillis	7,806	0.41%	
Prohibition	Mark R. Shaw	3,716	0.20%	
Total votes		1,910,161	100.00%	

== See also ==
- 1949–1950 Massachusetts legislature
