= 1899 Massachusetts gubernatorial election =

- November 8, 1899
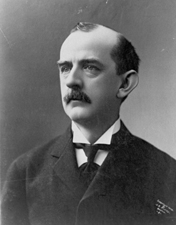

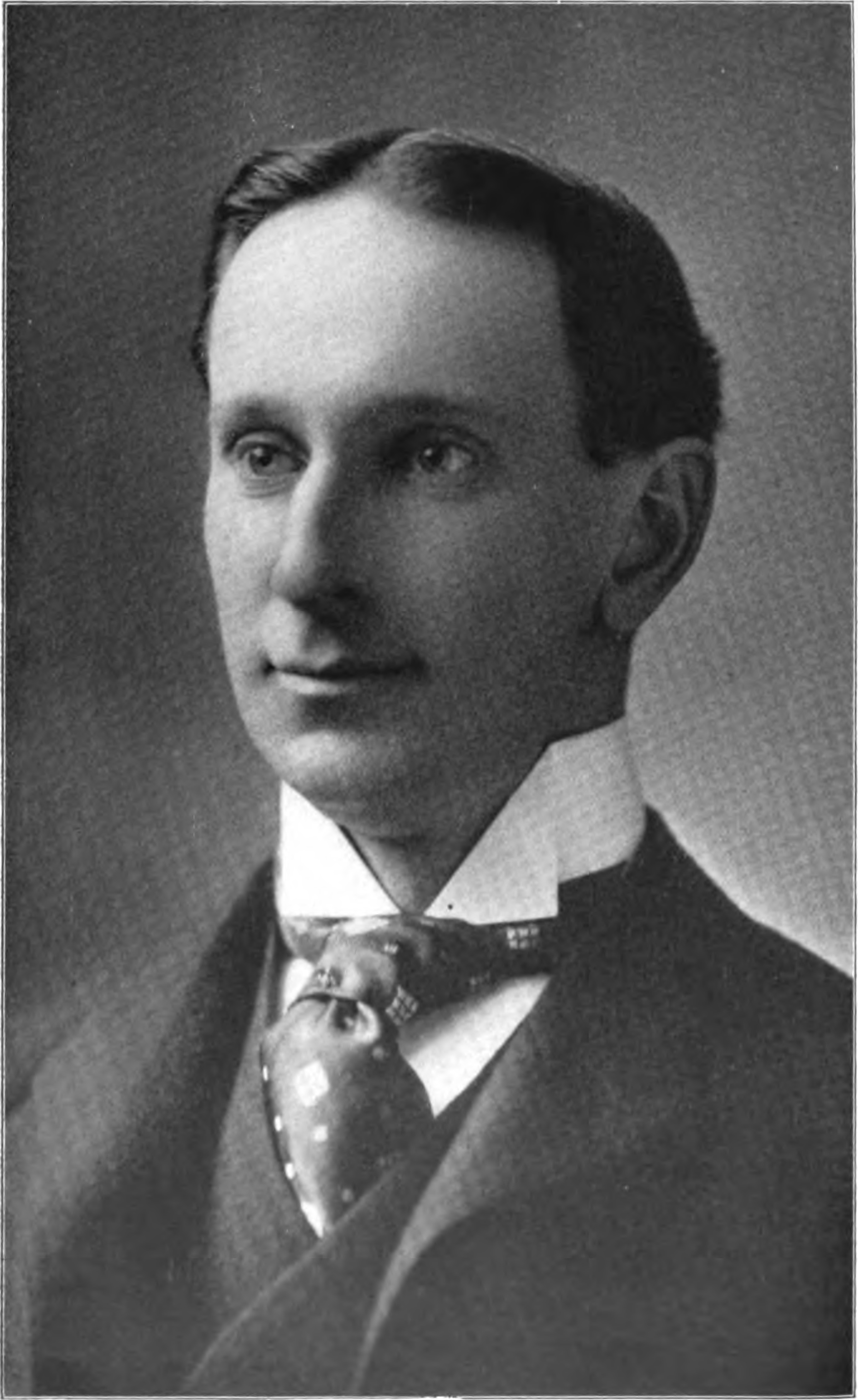
Nominee	W. Murray Crane	Robert Treat Paine
Party	Republican	Democratic
Popular vote	168,902	103,802
Percentage	56.46%	34.70%
- Crane: 40-50% 50–60% 60–70% 70–80% 80–90% >90% Paine: 40-50% 50–60%
Governor before election
Roger Wolcott
Republican
Elected Governor
W. Murray Crane
Republican

The 1899 Massachusetts gubernatorial election was held on November 8, 1899. Incumbent Republican Governor Roger Wolcott did not run for re-election to a fourth one-year term. Lt. Governor W. Murray Crane was elected to succeed him, defeating Democrat Robert Treat Paine.

== General election ==
=== Candidates ===
- Albert B. Coats (Prohibition)
- W. Murray Crane, lieutenant governor of Massachusetts (Republican)
- Robert Treat Paine Jr. (Democratic)
- George R. Peare (Socialist Labor)
- Winfield P. Porter (Social Democratic)

=== Results ===
1899 Massachusetts gubernatorial election
Party	Candidate	Votes	%	±%
Republican	W. Murray Crane	168,902	56.46%	▼3.70
Democratic	Robert Treat Paine Jr.	103,802	34.70%	▲0.72
Socialist Labor	George R. Peare	10,778	3.60%	▼0.43
Social Democratic	Winfield P. Porter	8,262	2.76%	▲1.58
Prohibition	Albert B. Coats	7,402	2.47%	▲0.98
Write-in	All others	20	0.01%	▼0.02
Total votes		299,166	100.00%	

== See also ==
- 1899 Massachusetts legislature
