= Main Street Cemetery =

Historic cemetery in Massachusetts, United States

- U.S. National Register of Historic Places
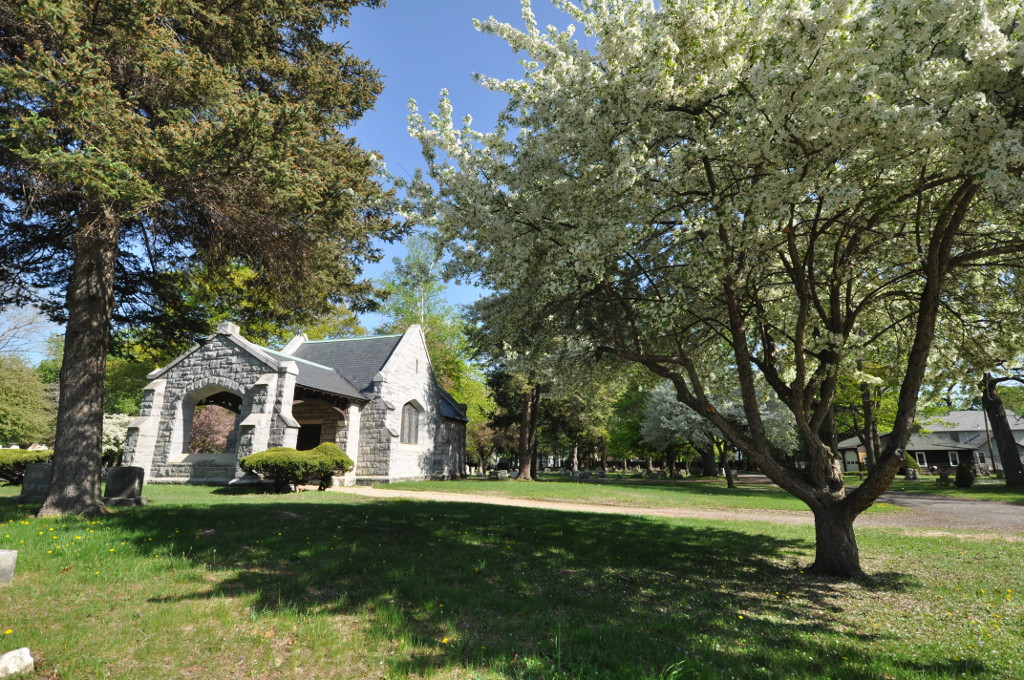

- Location within Massachusetts Location within the United States
- Location: Dalton, Massachusetts
- Coordinates: 42°28′27″N 73°10′31″W
- Area: 10.2 acres (4.1 ha)
- Built: 1781
- Architect: Batterson, J.G.; et al.
- Architectural style: Late Gothic Revival
- NRHP reference No.: 00000502
- Added to NRHP: May 18, 2000

The Main Street Cemetery is a historic cemetery on Main Street in Dalton, Massachusetts. Although the cemetery dates to 1781, much of it was laid out in the 19th century, during the rural cemetery movement. Its most prominent burials are those of the Crane family, whose papermaking business, Crane and Company, has dominated Dalton since the 1820s. The cemetery was listed on the National Register of Historic Places in 2000.

== Description and history ==
The Main Street Cemetery is located on the western fringe of Dalton's developed downtown area, near its town line with Pittsfield. It is bounded on the south by Main Street, the west by Park Avenue, the north by properties fronting on John Street, and the east by properties fronting on Willis Street and Flansburg Avenue. It is roughly rectangular, and about 10 acres (4.0 ha) in size. Its most visible element is a long concrete wall, built in 1911, that separates it from Main Street. The cemetery grounds consist of meandering gravel paths, dotted with mature trees and other plantings. The cemetery has more than 850 burials, and remains in active use.

The oldest portion of the cemetery appears to be its northeastern section, which is where the town's first meeting house was located. The cemetery's oldest dated burials are from 1788, not long after the town's incorporation (1784). The two largest plots in the cemetery are those of the Crane and Weston families, both of which have been historically important to the town's papermaking business. The cemetery chapel, built in 1907, is a prominent local example of Gothic Revival architecture, designed by the Pittsfield firm of Harding & Seaver.

== Notable interments ==
- Josephine Porter Boardman, socialite and patron of the arts who co-founded the Metropolitan Museum of Art
- Bruce Crane, Businessman and politician who was president and chairman of Crane & Co. and a member of the Massachusetts Governor's Council
- Winthrop Murray Crane, political figure and businessman who was Lieutenant Governor of Massachusetts, Governor of Massachusetts, and a United States senator
- Byron Weston, Lieutenant Governor of Massachusetts from 1880 to 1883

== See also ==
- East Main Street Cemetery
- National Register of Historic Places listings in Berkshire County, Massachusetts
