= 1900 Massachusetts gubernatorial election =

- November 5, 1900
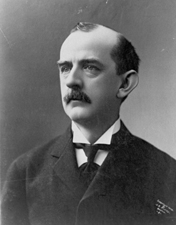

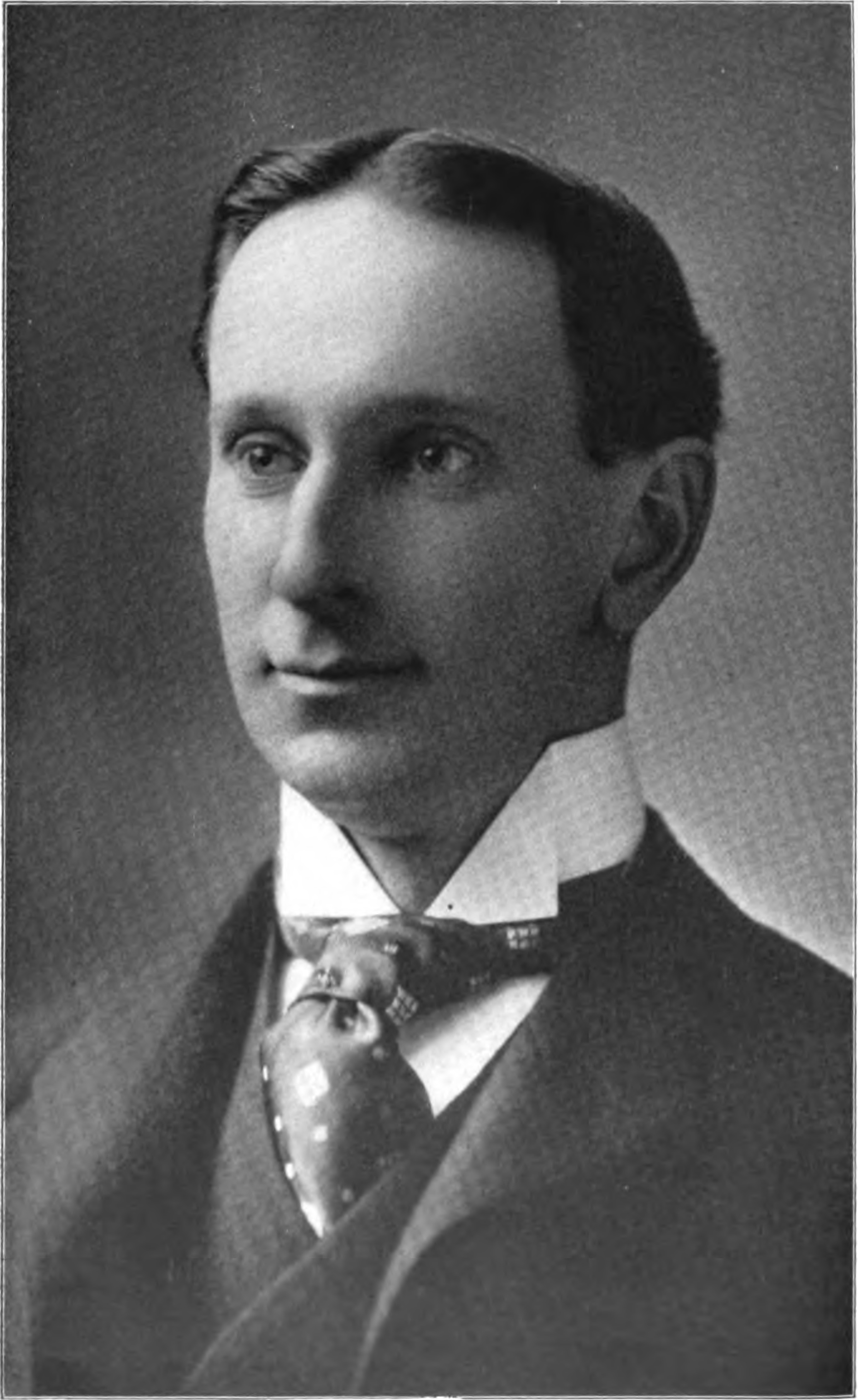
Nominee	W. Murray Crane	Robert T. Paine Jr.
Party	Republican	Democratic
Popular vote	228,054	130,078
Percentage	59.06%	33.69%
- Crane: 40-50% 50–60% 60–70% 70–80% 80–90% >90% Paine: 40-50% 50–60% 60–70%
Governor before election
W. Murray Crane
Republican
Elected Governor
W. Murray Crane
Republican

The 1900 Massachusetts gubernatorial election was held on November 5, 1900. Incumbent Republican Governor W. Murray Crane was re-elected to a second term in office.

== General election ==
=== Candidates ===
- Michael T. Berry (Socialist Labor)
- Charles H. Bradley (Social Democratic)
- W. Murray Crane, incumbent governor since January 1900 (Republican)
- John M. Fisher (Prohibition)
- Robert Treat Paine Jr., nominee for governor in 1899 (Democratic)

=== Results ===
1900 Massachusetts gubernatorial election
Party	Candidate	Votes	%	±%
Republican	W. Murray Crane (incumbent)	228,054	59.06%	▲2.60
Democratic	Robert Treat Paine Jr.	130,078	33.69%	▼1.01
Social Democratic	Charles H. Bradley	13,260	3.43%	▲0.73
Socialist Labor	Michael T. Berry	8,784	2.28%	▼1.32
Prohibition	John M. Fisher	5,950	1.54%	▼0.93
Write-in	All others	8	0.00%	Steady
Total votes		386,134	100.00%	

== See also ==
- 1900 Massachusetts legislature
