= Cape Cod Hospital =

- Cape Cod Healthcare
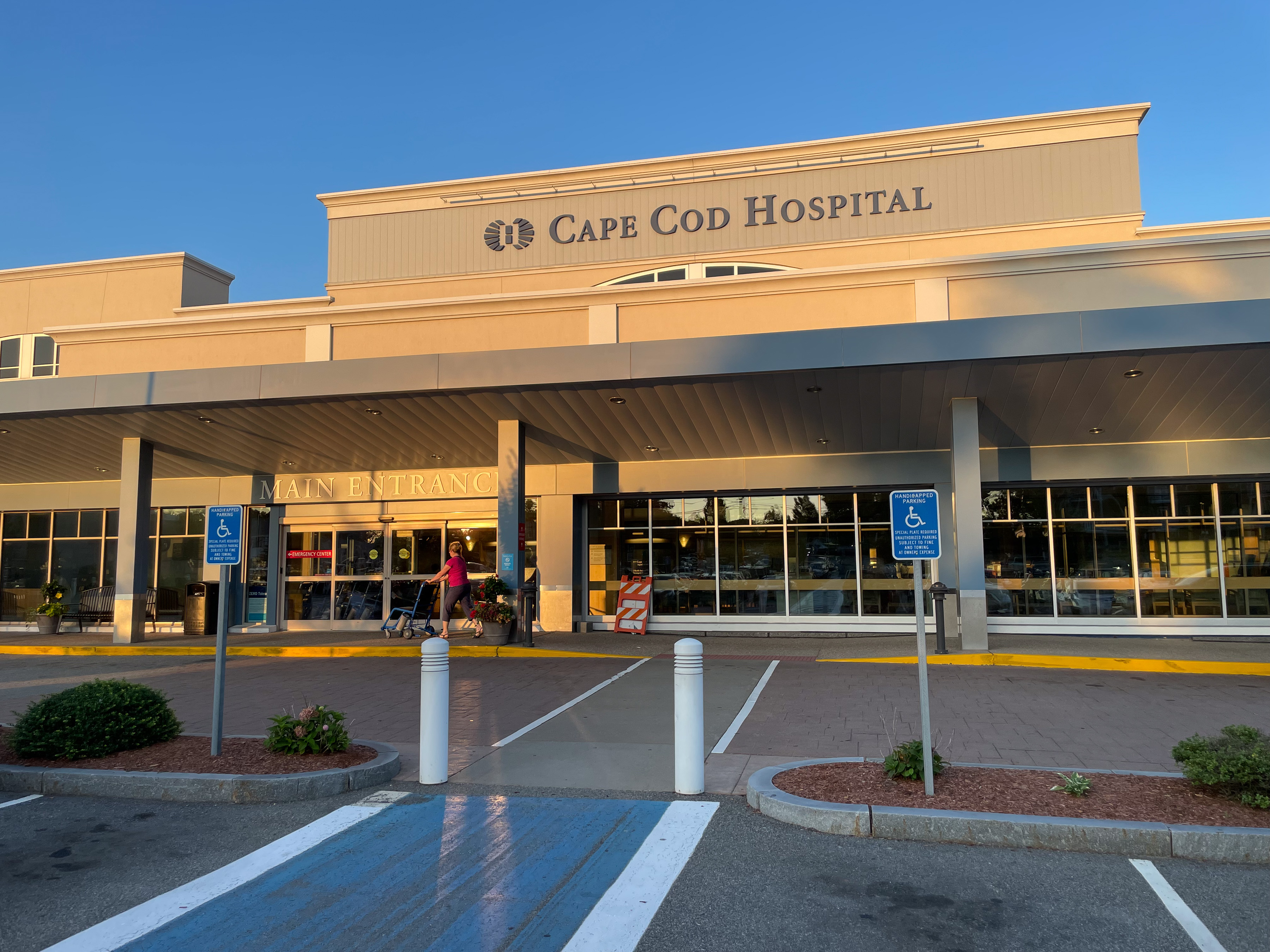

Geography
- Location: Hyannis, Massachusetts, Barnstable, Massachusetts, Massachusetts, United States
- Coordinates: 41°39′10″N 70°16′18″W

Organization
- Affiliated university: Cape Cod Hospital School of Nursing (1940's–1971)

Services
- Emergency department: Level III Trauma Center
- Beds: 283

History
- Founded: 1920

Links
- Website: https://www.capecodhealth.org/locations/profile/cape-cod-hospital/
- Lists: Hospitals in Massachusetts

Cape Cod Hospital is a not-for-profit regional medical center located in Hyannis, Massachusetts. Founded in 1920, as of 2011 it is the largest hospital on Cape Cod. The administration is headed by CEO Michael K. Lauf.

The hospital has 283 beds with more than 1,700 employees and 300 physicians on staff. It has an extensive cardiac care service in a partnership with Harvard University Medical School affiliate Brigham and Women's Hospital. The hospital is also affiliated with the Floating Hospital for Children at Tufts Medical Center, as well the University of Massachusetts T.H. Chan School of Medicine.

The emergency department is one of the busiest in Massachusetts, providing emergency services to more than 84,000 patients on an annual basis.

== History ==
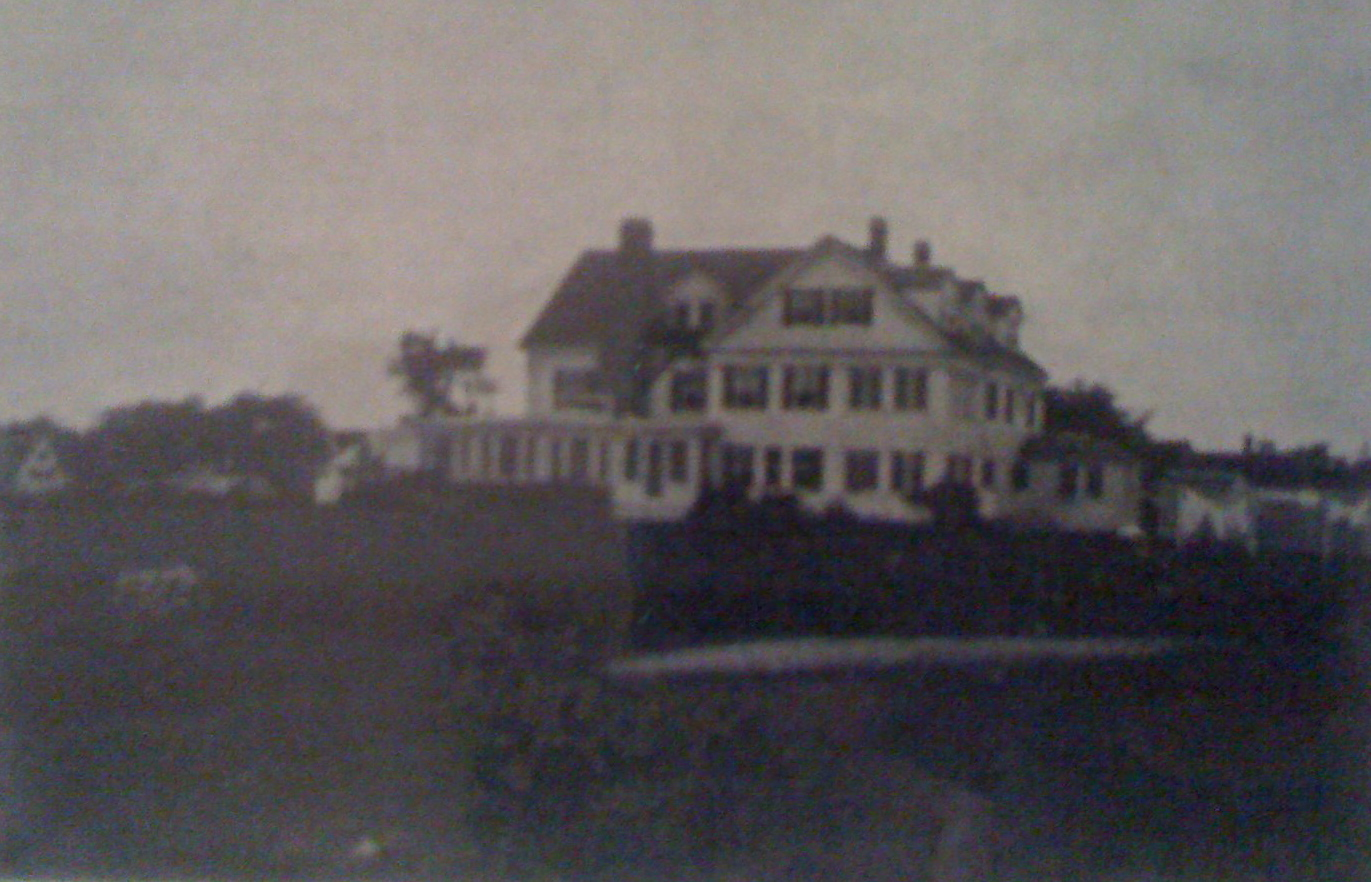
This photo of the hospital was taken in 1922 by the Cape Cod Publishing Company

Before the founding of the hospital, the Visiting Nurse Association of Cape Cod formed in 1916 to establish a single nurse in Falmouth, Massachusetts.

Until the founding of the hospital, injured fisherman would be sent by train to Boston for treatment. Local businessmen initiated an effort to establish an area hospital. The hospital was founded in 1920.

From the mid-1940s, until 1971, the hospital was home to the Cape Cod Hospital School of Nursing, which trained local nurses.

Falmouth Hospital was founded in 1963 to serve the upper Cape and in 1996 that merged with Cape Cod Hospital and the Visiting Nurse Association to form the unified Cape Cod Healthcare organization, currently the parent company for Cape Cod Hospital.

The hospital was led by James Lyons from 1981 through its merger. Lyons then was the Cape Cod Healthcare CEO until 1998. Between 1998 and 2008, Steven Abbott was CEO of the unified Cape Cod Healthcare. Beginning on July 10, 2008, Dr. Richard F. Salluzzo—former CEO of Wellmont Health System in Kingsport, Tennessee—replaced Abbott.

Given that it is located in Hyannis, Massachusetts, the location of the Kennedy Compound, it is known for being the hospital where Senator Edward M. Kennedy was initially treated for the seizure which led to his brain tumor diagnosis in 2008 and where Eunice Kennedy Shriver died in August 2009.

In January 2025, the hospital was designated by the Massachusetts Department of Health as a Level III Trauma Center after being verified as such by the American College of Surgeons.
