= William Craig (Secret Service) =

American law enforcement agent (1855–1902)

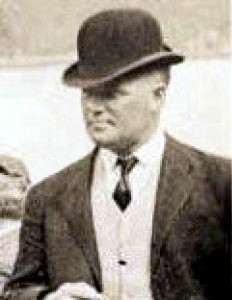

William J. "Big Bill" Craig (November 21, 1855 – September 3, 1902) was a Scottish-born American who was among the first agents of the United States Secret Service tasked with protecting a President of the United States. He was also the first of only two Secret Service agents who have ever been killed in the line of duty while protecting an American president, the other being Leslie Coffelt. Before protecting presidents, Craig was known for teaching and exhibiting use of the broadsword, as well as for his work apprehending counterfeiters.

== Early life and career ==
Born in Glasgow, Scotland in November 1855, Craig was fair-haired, blue-eyed and stood 6 foot 4 weighing 260 pounds. He spent 12 years in the Royal Horse Guards of the British Army, including duty guarding Queen Victoria; he also was in charge of the British army gymnasium for eight years, and took part in the Nile Expedition.

Following his honorable discharge from the army, at age 38 he migrated to Chicago's South Side where he taught fencing and boxing. He was proficient with the broadsword, and gave exhibitions, including with the wrestler Duncan C. Ross, performing feats never attempted by anyone else in the country.

Craig joined the Secret Service in 1900. He was transferred to Birmingham, Alabama where he helped to stop a gang of counterfeiters. Craig was then transferred to Pittsburgh, Pennsylvania and continued to thwart counterfeiters.

== Protecting presidents ==
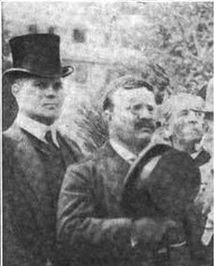
Craig and Theodore Roosevelt

When President William McKinley visited Buffalo, New York for the Pan-American Exposition in 1901, the Secret Service assigned Craig to help protect the President, and Craig was there when McKinley was shot. Vice-President Theodore Roosevelt subsequently arrived in Buffalo, and Craig was then assigned to guard him, and would continue to do so as long as Craig lived.

After the assassination of McKinley, the Secret Service was formally and permanently given the task of presidential protection. Although Roosevelt was sometimes annoyed by his Secret Service detail and sought to escape them, Craig set up a cordon of protection around Roosevelt's Sagamore Hill vacation home that prevented much greater annoyance by people from New York City who wanted to visit the President for various reasons. Craig became almost a part of Roosevelt's family, and was especially close to the Roosevelt children, including four-year-old Quentin Roosevelt who joined him to read comics.

Craig was killed on September 3, 1902, when a speeding trolley car rammed into the open horse-drawn carriage carrying President Roosevelt in Pittsfield, Massachusetts. Craig, who was sitting at the front of the carriage next to the driver, reportedly turned back to see the oncoming trolley car, and maybe had time to shout or try to shield Roosevelt. Craig was then thrown from the carriage and crushed by the trolley.

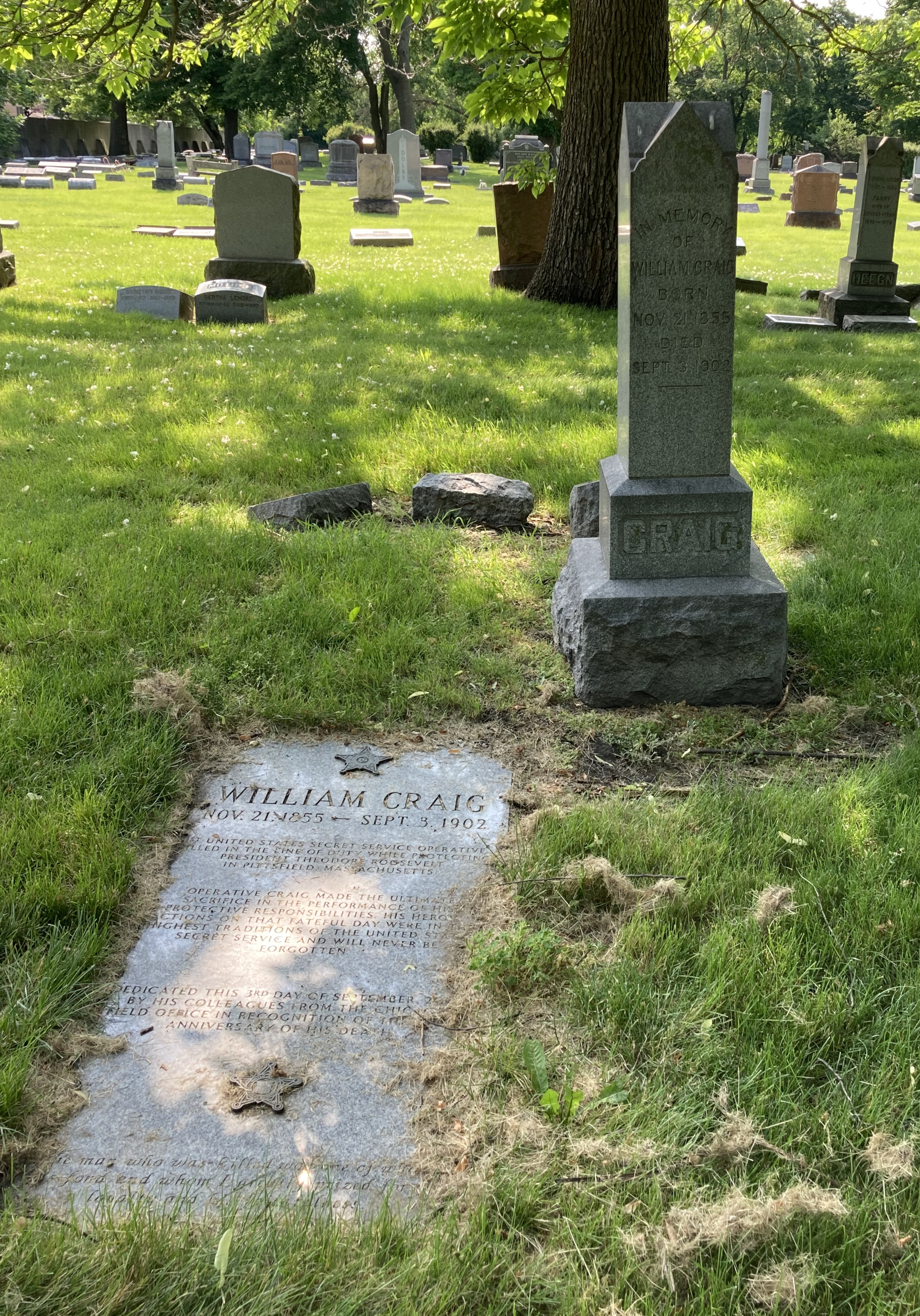
Craig's grave at Oak Woods Cemetery

Also in the carriage were Massachusetts governor Winthrop M. Crane and presidential assistant George B. Cortelyou who both survived. The President received cuts and bruises, and kneeling next to the wreckage said "Poor Craig. How my children will feel." The President later said: "The man who was killed was one of whom I was fond and whom I greatly prized for his loyalty and faithfulness." The driver of the trolley, Euclid Madden, pleaded guilty to manslaughter, was fined, and served six months in jail. The crash occurred because Madden and his passengers had departed late, and were speeding to catch up with the President whom they wanted to meet or hear.

At the time of his death, Craig was engaged to actress Katherine Murphy. He was buried in Oak Woods Cemetery, Chicago. In 2002, one hundred years after his death, Craig's life was commemorated with a cemetery procession of bagpipes and drums, accompanied by police, Secret Service officials, and Craig's relatives.
