= Bruce Crane (businessman) =

American businessman and politician

Member of the Massachusetts Governor's Council from the 8th District
- In office 1953–1957
- Preceded by: Edward G. Shea
- Succeeded by: Raymond F. Sullivan

Personal details
- Born: July 27, 1909 Dalton, Massachusetts, U.S.
- Died: June 2, 1985 (aged 75) Pittsfield, Massachusetts, U.S.
- Resting place: Main Street Cemetery; Dalton, Massachusetts
- Party: Republican
- Spouse: Winnie Davis Long Crane
- Education: Yale University
- Occupation: Businessman; Politician

Bruce Crane (July 27, 1909 – June 2, 1985) was an American businessman and politician who was president and chairman of Crane & Co. and a member of the Massachusetts Governor's Council.

== Early life ==
Crane was born in Dalton, Massachusetts, to Winthrop Murray Crane and Josephine Porter Boardman. He attended Dalton public schools and the Lawrence Academy School. In 1931, he graduated from Yale University.

== Political career ==
Crane was a member of the Dalton Finance Committee and from 1946 to 1951 served on the Dalton School Committee. From 1953 to 1957 he represented the 8th District on the Massachusetts Governor's Council. From 1964 to 1980 he was a member of the Republican National Committee.

== Business career ==
After graduating from Yale, Crane went to work at his family's company, Crane & Co., which made paper for the United States Treasury. From 1951 to 1975, Crane was president at Crane & Co. He retired as president in 1975, but remained chairman until his death in 1985.

== Personal life and death ==
In 1932, Crane married Winnie Davis Long. The couple moved into Sugar Hill, his parents' home in Dalton that had been unoccupied since his mother moved out in 1924. The couple had twin daughters, Winnie and Davis, born in March 1935.

Crane died on June 2, 1985, at the Berkshire Medical Center in Pittsfield, Massachusetts, at the age of 75.

Winnie Crane remained at Sugar Hill until her death in 1991, even though she reportedly never liked the house. Sugar Hill is now a senior living community.

Party political offices
Preceded by Richard Treadway	Republican National Committeeman from Massachusetts; 1964–1980	Succeeded by Gordon M. Nelson
