= Wells Memorial Institute =

Workingman's club in Boston

Wells Memorial Institute was a workingman's club in Boston meant to promote social interaction, mutual help, recreation, and training for working people. It was organized in 1879 by Robert Treat Paine, who was inspired by the English working men's clubs, and named after Rev. E. M. P. Wells of the Episcopal City Mission of Boston.

It offered courses on mechanical drawing, civil service, automobile construction, English, public speaking, cooking, household economics, embroidery, and millinery. It was located at 987 Washington Street.

The Lowell Institute lectures on "mechanics" were given at the Wells in the 19th century.
