= 1902 Pittsfield Streetcar Incident =

1902 traffic collision

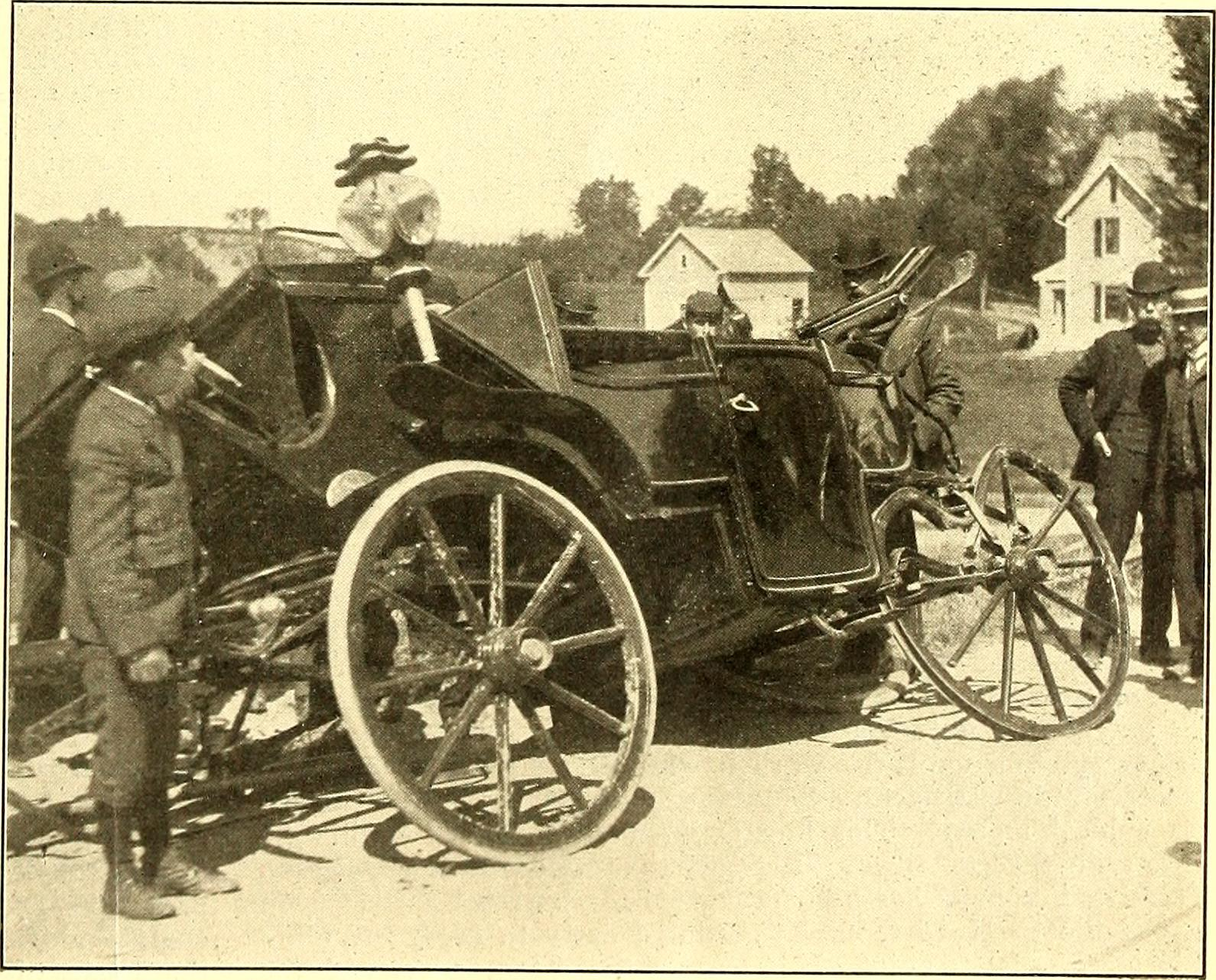
- Theodore Roosevelt's carriage after the collision
- Date: September 3, 1902
- Location: Pittsfield, Massachusetts, U.S.
- Type: Traffic collision
- Deaths: 1
- Injuries: 3
- Arrests: Euclid Madden
- Charges: Manslaughter
- Verdict: Guilty
- Sentence: Six-month jail term and $300 fine

The 1902 Pittsfield Streetcar Incident was a collision involving President Theodore Roosevelt, who was traveling in a horse-drawn carriage in Pittsfield, Massachusetts. A speeding electric streetcar under the control of motorman Euclid Madden and conductor James Kelly hit the presidential carriage as it crossed the trolley tracks, jettisoning Roosevelt, who was injured. The accident resulted in the death of William Craig, Roosevelt's Secret Service agent, and injured Secretary to the President George B. Cortelyou. Governor Winthrop M. Crane was lightly bruised.

== Background ==
In late 1902, President Theodore Roosevelt embarked on a tour of New England to build support ahead of the 1902 midterm elections. On September 3, Roosevelt gave a speech at the City Park, then visited former senator Henry Dawes. The carriage left Dawes' home around 10:00 AM, accompanied by a mounted escort en route to the Pittsfield Country Club for another speech.

The President rode in a landau, an open-top carriage seating four, pulled by four gray horses. President Roosevelt sat in the back seat beside Massachusetts Governor Winthrop M. Crane, while George Cortelyou, Secretary to the President and former Secretary to President McKinley, sat alone in the front seat facing the rear. On the left side of the carriage's front bench, livery owner David J. Pratt of Dalton, Massachusetts, drove the team of horses, with Agent William Craig seated on the left side of the elevated seat.

Passengers in the presidential carriage

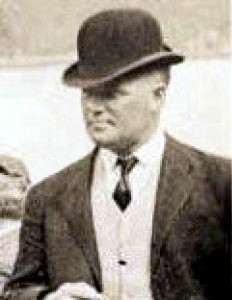
William Craig

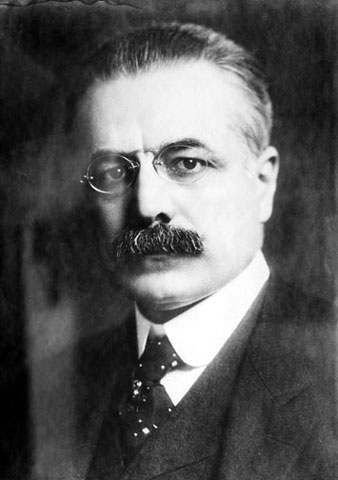
George Cortelyou

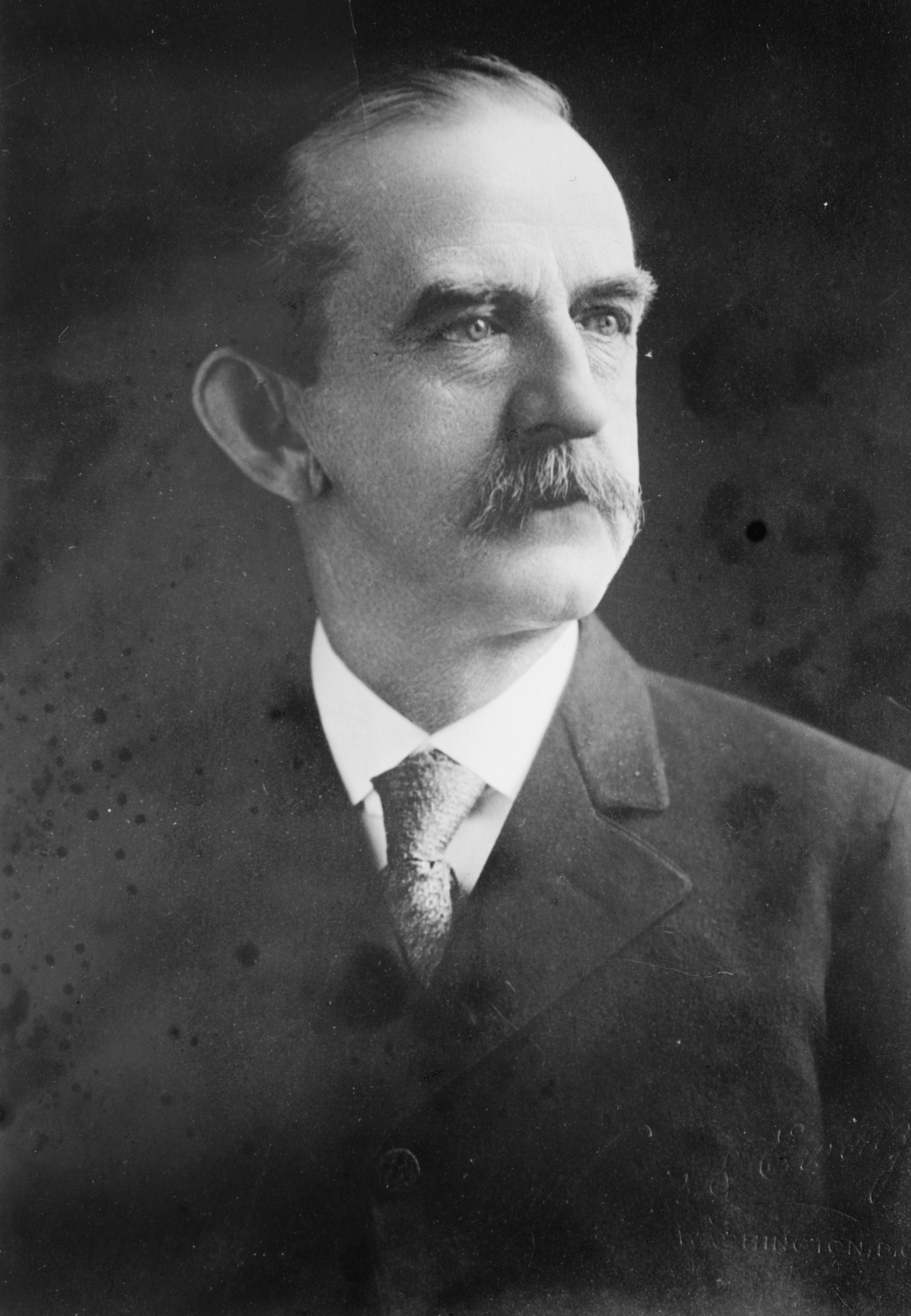
Winthrop Crane

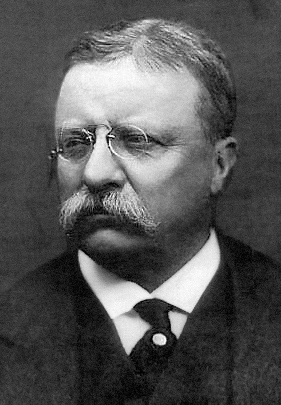
Theodore Roosevelt

At the same time, Trolley No. 29 conducted by James Kelly and driven by motorman Euclid "Luke" Madden was moving along South Street, also toward the Country Club, with 35 passengers. Some accounts claim that motorman Euclid Madden sped up the trolley in order to beat the President to the country club, while Madden's own testimony was that it was proceeding on schedule. Contemporary reporting in the Street Railway Journal stated that the trolley was geared for no more than 15 mph, was on an upgrade, running with power off, and that passengers attested it was not speeding.

== Accident ==
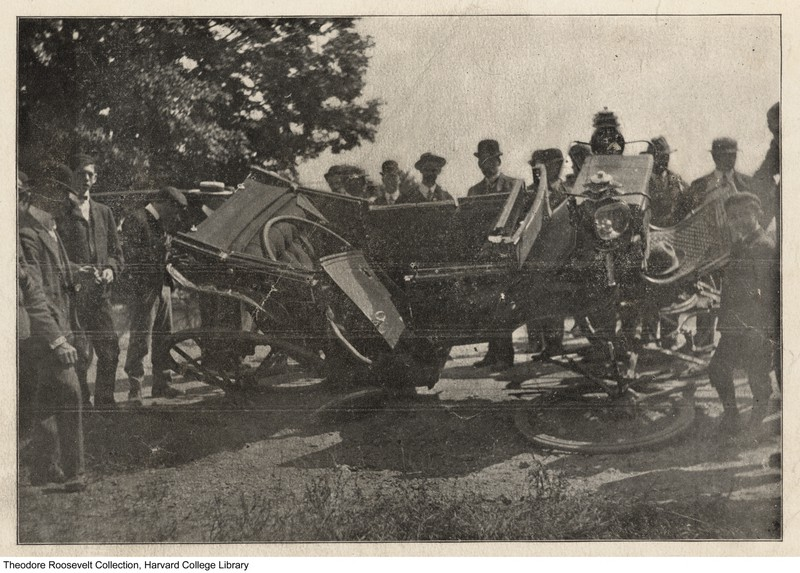
The Street railway journal (1902) (14780989053)

At approximately 10:15AM, Roosevelt's motorcade was travelling along South Street when the mounted troopers assigned to protect him noticed the approaching trolley. As the streetcar turned onto the street with the presidential carriage, the driver rang the trolley bell and attempted to stop. Two cavalrymen flagged down the motorman, ordering the trolley to stop, but it nevertheless collided with the back left wheel of the carriage, smashing the carriage's back and striking the front wheel as well. The impact sent the carriage into the air briefly.

William Craig yelled for the president to “Look out! Hold fast!” before they were both thrown off the wagon. Craig was thrown under the streetcar and killed instantly while Roosevelt was thrown out and hit his head on the sidewalk. Cortelyou sustained serious injuries. Governor Crane escaped uninjured. Pratt, the driver, struck his head, resulting in a fractured skull. One carriage horse was also killed in the collision.

== Aftermath ==
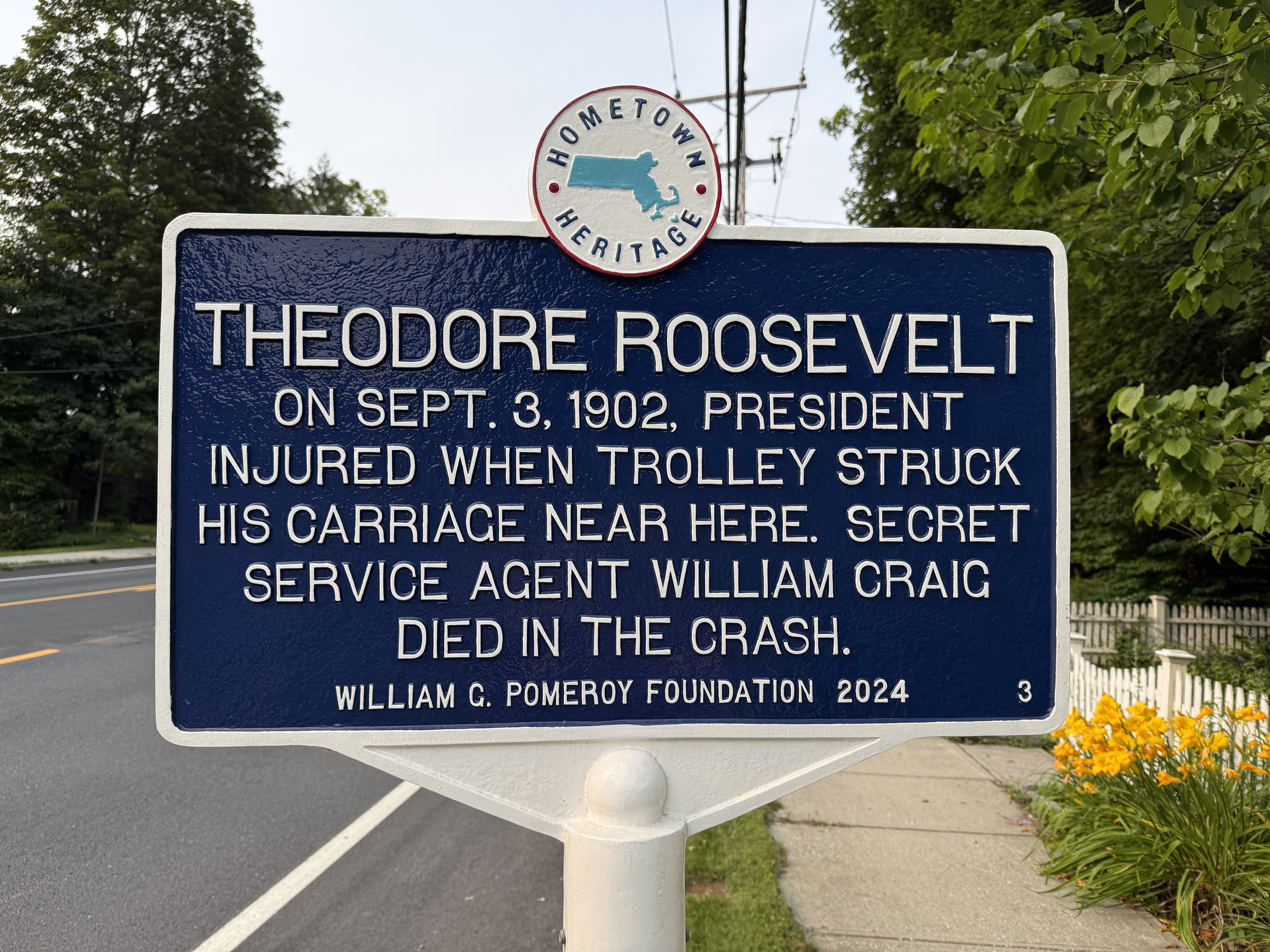
Hometown Heritage marker commemorating the 1902 accident, located on South Street in Pittsfield, Massachusetts

The motorman of the streetcar was confronted by Roosevelt immediately following the incident. The driver was taken to the House of Mercy, a cottage hospital in Pittsfield.

Roosevelt initially continued with his tour of New England as originally scheduled, continuing on to Lenox, but by the end of the day cut the rest of the tour short and returned to Sagamore Hill by presidential yacht to recuperate. Three weeks later, he returned to the campaign trail in the Midwest, starting in Detroit. This tour was also cut short in Noblesville when Roosevelt's leg wound from the collision became infected. He was taken to St. Vincent Indianapolis Hospital for surgery, which was successful.

A trial was held in January 1903. Motorman Euclid Madden and conductor James Kelly of the streetcar both pled guilty to manslaughter. Kelly was released, but Madden was sentenced to six months in jail and fined $300, equivalent to $11,163 in 2025. District Attorney Dana Malone was responsible for Madden's prosecution.
