= Michael Favulli =

American athlete, educator, and politician (1908–1990)

Member of the Massachusetts Governor's Council from the 7th District
- In office 1957–1963
- Preceded by: George A. Wells
- Succeeded by: Walt Kelly

Personal details
- Born: May 8, 1908 Worcester, Massachusetts
- Died: September 4, 1990 (aged 82) Falmouth, Massachusetts
- Party: Democratic
- Education: College of the Holy Cross; Clark University

Michael Joseph Favulli (1908–1990) was an American athlete, educator, and politician who served on the Worcester, Massachusetts city council from 1954 to 1960 and the Massachusetts Governor's Council from 1957 to 1963. He was convicted of bribery in 1965.

== Athletics ==
Favulli was born on May 8, 1908, in Worcester, Massachusetts. After graduating from St. John's Preparatory School, Favulli attended the College of the Holy Cross, where he was a member of the Holy Cross Crusaders football team. He took over the starting center role his sophomore season, but also saw snaps at right tackle due to injuries. Favulli missed the entire 1931 season due to a knee injury. He reinjured the knee in the October 15, 1932, game against Detroit, ending his football career.

On November 28, 1932, Favulli announced he would become a professional boxer. He was managed by Cecil P. Dodge, former co-manager of Lou Brouillard. He made his pro debut on December 9, 1932, in Worcester. In the fight, he knocked out Jimmy Sheldon in 42 seconds. On February 10, 1933, he knocked out Eddie Callahan.

== Coaching ==
Favulli coached at Millbury High School, taught and coached at the Grafton Street Junior High School, and coached football, basketball and baseball at the Worcester Academy. In 1946 he served as the junior varsity football coach at Holy Cross. In 1947 he promoted boxing at the Worcester Memorial Auditorium.

== Politics ==
In 1953, Favulli was elected to the Worcester City Council. He remained on the council until he was defeated for reelection in 1959. In 1956, Favulli was elected to represent the 7th District on the Massachusetts Governor's Council. He was beat by funeral home director Walt Kelly in the 1962 Democratic primary, ending his tenure on the council. Following his defeat, Favulli became a special representative to the Massachusetts Commerce Department.

== Bribery trials ==
On May 7, 1964, Favulli was indicted on bribery charges for allegedly soliciting and receiving a bribe from a man with a criminal record seeking a pardon. On December 10, 1964, he was found not guilty.

On October 13, 1964, Favulli was one of four councilors indicted for soliciting and accepting bribes from Governor Foster Furcolo in exchange for voting in favor of the reappointment of state public works commissioner Anthony N. DiNatale. On September 28, 1965, Favulli, Joseph Ray Crimmins, Raymond F. Sullivan, and Ernest C. Stasiun were found guilty of conspiracy and requesting bribes in connection with DiNatale's reappointment. He was sentenced to two years in jail. On March 14, 1967, Favulli was ordered to jail by Judge Eugene A. Hudson after the Massachusetts Supreme Judicial Court upheld his conviction. He was released on parole on September 21, 1967.

== Later life and death ==
In 1972, Favulli moved to Falmouth, Massachusetts. His wife, Elizabeth C. (Nuzzo) Favulli, died in 1989. On September 4, 1990, Favulli died in Falmouth Hospital. He was survived by two sons and a daughter.
