= Louise Crane =

American philanthropist (1913–1997)

- Born: November 11, 1913
- Died: October 20, 1997 (aged 83)
- Citizenship: American

Louise Crane (November 11, 1913 – October 20, 1997) was a prominent American philanthropist. Crane was a friend to some of New York City’s leading literary figures, including Tennessee Williams and Marianne Moore.

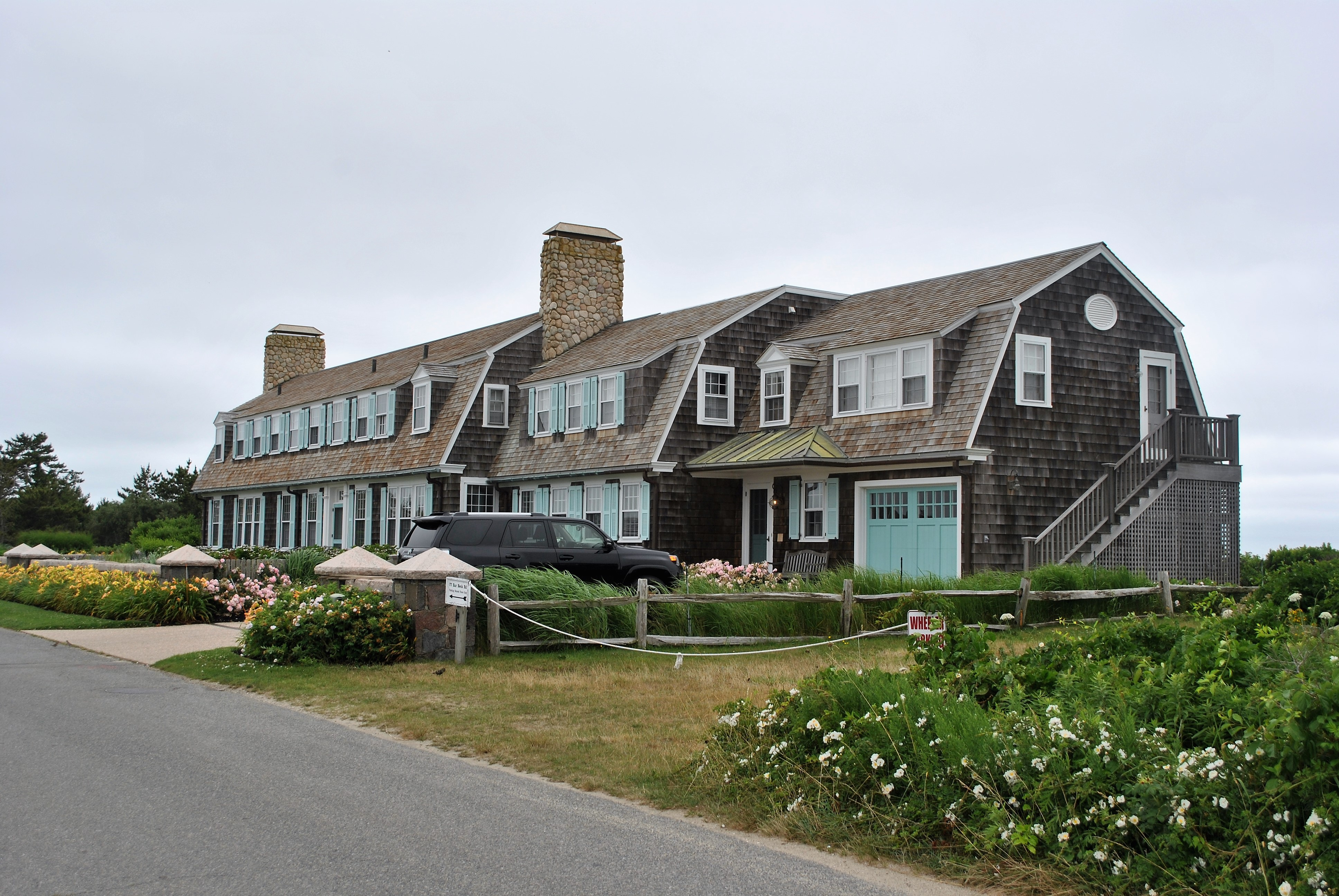
"The Long House", Woods Hole, Massachusetts, one of the residences of Crane and Victoria Kent

Crane's father Winthrop Murray Crane was an American millionaire and former governor of Massachusetts. Her mother was Museum of Modern Art (MoMA) co-founder Josephine Porter Boardman. Louise smoothly moved into the role of patron of the arts. She was a prominent supporter of jazz and orchestral music, initiating a series of "coffee concerts" at MoMA and commissioning a vocal and orchestral work by Lukas Foss. She represented musicians, including Mary Lou Williams. Crane collaborated also with her mother in sponsoring musical works.

Crane met Elizabeth Bishop while classmates together at Vassar in 1930. The pair traveled extensively in Europe and bought a house together in 1937 in Key West, Florida. While Bishop lived in Key West, Crane occasionally returned to New York. Crane developed a passionate interest in Billie Holiday in 1941.

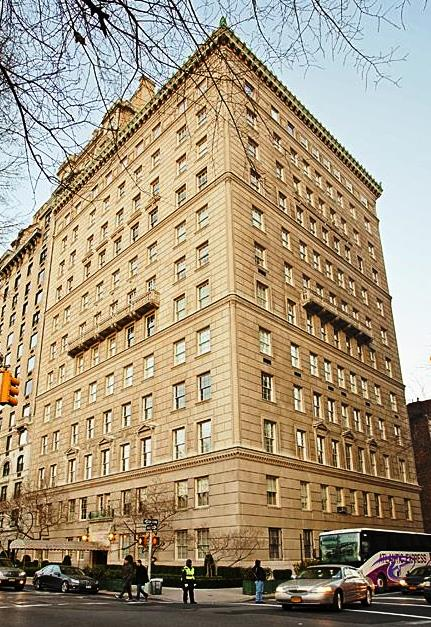
820 Fifth Avenue, Crane lived here in a luxury co-op for many years

Crane published Ibérica, a Spanish-language review, with her partner, Victoria Kent, from 1954 to 1974. Ibérica featured news for the expatriate Spanish community in the United States. Kent was a prominent member of the Spanish Republican party, opposed to Franco. Many prominent writers, including Salvador Madariaga, contributed to Ibérica.

Following her mother's death in 1972, Crane and Kent lived together in Woods Hole, Massachusetts, and Redding, Connecticut. Crane was the executor of Marianne Moore's estate after her death in 1972.

Crane lived for years in an 18-room apartment on the fourth floor of the 820 Fifth Avenue building, a luxury cooperative in Manhattan, New York City. Located at the northeast corner of East 63rd Street on the Upper East Side, the 12 story limestone-clad was designed in the neo-Italian Renaissance palazzo style by Starrett & van Vleck, and was built by Fred T. Ley in 1916. The fourth floor is one of only a few units in the building which have changed hands multiple times in the last 10 or 20 years. After Crane’s death in 1997, the apartment was sold to Tommy Hilfiger for around $10,000,000.

Crane and Kent are buried alongside each other at Umpawaug Cemetery, Redding, Connecticut.
