= Jayne Wrightsman =

American philanthropist and art collector (1919–2019)

- Born: Jane Kirkman Larkin; October 21, 1919; Flint, Michigan, U.S.
- Died: April 20, 2019 (aged 99); New York City, U.S.
- Occupation(s): Socialite, philanthropist, collector, museum patron
- Spouse: Charles B. Wrightsman

Jayne Kirkman Wrightsman (née Larkin; October 21, 1919 – April 20, 2019) was an American philanthropist, arts collector and widow of Charles B. Wrightsman (1895–1986). She was named to the International Best Dressed List Hall of Fame in 1965. She was a resident and president of the co-op board at 820 Fifth Avenue.

== Biography ==
She was born in Michigan, and grew up in Los Angeles.

Beginning in 1952, she and her husband amassed the finest private collection in the US of the decorative arts of the ancien régime, ultimately donating many objects (comprising the Wrightsman Galleries) to the Metropolitan Museum of Art in New York. Jayne Wrightsman also served as a member of the museum's 100th Anniversary Committee and was elected to the board of trustees in 1975.

in 1994 Wrightsman gave an impressionist painting by Claude Monet entitled "Le Repos Dans le Jardin, Argenteuil," to the Metropolitan, but it was discovered to have been looted by Nazis from a Jewish collector during the Holocaust and was sold in 2002 following a settlement with the Newman family.

In December 2012, Magnificent Jewels from the Collection of Mrs. Charles Wrightsman raised $15,541,188 at auction with Sotheby's, New York.

Wrightsman died on April 20, 2019, aged 99.

== See also ==
- Study of a Young Woman (Vermeer)
