= Raymond F. Sullivan =

American politician (1908–1994)

Member of the Massachusetts Governor's Council from the 8th District
- In office 1957–1965
- Preceded by: Bruce Crane
- Succeeded by: Pat Foley

Personal details
- Born: August 8, 1908 Springfield, Massachusetts
- Died: December 8, 1994 (aged 86) East Longmeadow, Massachusetts
- Party: Democratic

Raymond Francis Sullivan (August 8, 1908 – December 8, 1994) was an American politician who served on the Massachusetts Governor's Council from 1957 until his conviction for bribery in 1965.

== Early life ==
Sullivan was born on August 8, 1908, in Springfield, Massachusetts. He attended Sacred Heart School and Cathedral High School. Sullivan worked in the retail grocery business and as a grocery product salesman before switching to insurance.

== Politics ==
Sullivan represented Ward 7 on the Springfield Board of Aldermen from 1946 to 1960. He was president of the board in 1946, 1952, 1953, and 1958. He also served on the Springfield Property Committee. He and two other members of the committee were investigated in connection with the construction of the Duggan School, but no charges were ever filed.

In 1956, Sullivan was elected to the 8th District seat on the Massachusetts Governor's Council. After taking office, he controversially opened “an employment agency” to get state jobs for his constituents. In 1959, state insurance commissioner Joseph A. Humphreys alleged that Sullivan pressured him into granting a Florida insurance company a licence to sell auto insurance. Sullivan denied the accusations.

On October 13, 1964, Sullivan was one of four councilors indicted for soliciting and accepting bribes from Governor Foster Furcolo in exchange for voting in favor of the reappointment of state public works commissioner Anthony N. DiNatale. Despite the indictment, Sullivan was reelected. On September 28, 1965, Sullivan, Joseph Ray Crimmins, Michael Favulli, and Ernest C. Stasiun were found guilty of conspiracy and requesting bribes in connection with DiNatale's reappointment. He was sentenced to two years in jail and began his sentence on March 21, 1967.
