= Joseph Ray Crimmins =

American politician (1921–1989)

Member of the Massachusetts Governor's Council for the 6th District
- In office 1957–1965
- Preceded by: Lawrence Lloyd
- Succeeded by: G. Edward Bradley

Personal details
- Born: November 10, 1921 Cambridge, Massachusetts
- Died: January 21, 1989 (aged 67) Hyannis, Massachusetts
- Resting place: Ancient Cemetery; Yarmouth, Massachusetts
- Party: Democratic
- Education: Harvard University

Joseph Ray Crimmins (November 10, 1921 – January 21, 1989) was an American politician who served on the Massachusetts Governor's Council from 1957 until his conviction for bribery in 1965.

== Early life ==
Crimmins was born on November 10, 1921, in Cambridge, Massachusetts. He attended Cambridge public schools and Harvard University. During World War II he served in the United States Navy’s submarine service in the South Pacific. He settled in Somerville, Massachusetts, where he was engaged in the beverage and real estate businesses and was an insurance broker.

== Governor's Council and bribery conviction ==
In 1956, Crimmins defeated incumbent Lawrence Lloyd to win the 6th District seat on the Massachusetts Governor's Council. It was his first bid for elected office. On May 10, 1963, Crimmins, the chairman of the state housing board, and the head of the board's urban renewal program were indicted for conspiracy and accepting bribes in connection with state housing construction projects. Crimmins was indicted on two charges of soliciting and accepting bribes. The indictments came as a result as of an investigation by the Massachusetts Crime Commission. On October 7, 1964, while still awaiting trial, Crimmins was indicted for conspiracy to request and accept bribes from an architect following a crime commission investigation into the state public works department. Despite the indictments, Crimmins was reelected in 1964.

Crimmins was also one of four councilors indicted for soliciting and accepting bribes from Governor Foster Furcolo in exchange for voting in favor of the reappointment of state public works commissioner Anthony N. DiNatale. On September 28, 1965, Crimmins, Raymond F. Sullivan, Michael Favulli, and Ernest C. Stasiun were found guilty of conspiracy and requesting bribes in connection with DiNatale's reappointment. Crimmins was also found guilty of accepting a bribe in the case. Crimmins resigned following his conviction. Crimmins was sentenced to two and a half years to be served in the Middlesex House of Correction in Billerica, Massachusetts. He began his sentence on January 8, 1966. Crimmins was released on parole on September 3, 1966.

== Later life ==
Crimmins spent his later years in Hyannis, Massachusetts. He died on January 21, 1989.
