= Frankland W. L. Miles =

American lawyer

Presiding Justice of the Roxbury District Court
- In office 1938–1951

Special Justice of the Roxbury Municipal Court
- In office 1934–1938

Personal details
- Born: 1897 Brockton, Massachusetts, U.S.
- Died: January 14, 1974 (aged 76–77) Boston, Massachusetts, U.S.
- Spouse: Louise Grother
- Children: 2
- Education: Suffolk Law School (JD)

Frankland W. L. Miles was an American jurist and politician who served as presiding justice of the Roxbury District Court.

== Early life ==
Miles was born in Brockton, Massachusetts. He attended grammar school in Chelsea, Massachusetts, and graduated from Chelsea High School. Miles attended Boston University's College of Liberal Arts, but dropped out to provide additional financial support for his family. For a time he worked at the Federal Reserve Bank of Boston. In 1913 he moved to Roxbury. During World War I he served in the United States Navy. Miles eventually decided to return to school and graduated from Suffolk Law School in 1923.

== Judicial career ==
In 1934, Governor Frank G. Allen appointed Miles special justice of the Roxbury Municipal Court, the second busiest court in the Commonwealth after the Boston Municipal Court. In 1938 he was promoted to presiding justice by Governor Charles F. Hurley. Miles retired in 1951 due to deafness.

== Political career ==
In 1936, Miles was a candidate for Lieutenant Governor of Massachusetts. However, at the Republican convention, supporters of defeated gubernatorial candidate Leverett Saltonstall were able to engineer his nomination for Lieutenant Governor. In 1950, Miles was a candidate for Governor of Massachusetts. He finished fifth in the Republican primary with 10% of the vote. In 1958 Miles was the Republican nominee for the District 1 seat Massachusetts Governor's Council. He lost to Democrat Ernest C. Stasiun 55% to 45%.

== Personal life ==
In 1920, Miles married Louise Grother of Roxbury. Louise was 16 when they met. She was the pianist at the Roxbury church and one day, "this tall lanky gentleman walked into the church and I knew he was mine." They courted for 6 years and married. They had two children, Frankland W. L. Miles, Jr. and John Grother Miles. He was a fan of the Boston Braves baseball team and played with some of the players in exhibition games. Following his retirement, Miles resident in Plymouth and Canton, Massachusetts. He raised his two granddaughters, Stephanie and Victoria, while living in Chestnut Hill, MA. He died on January 14, 1974, at Massachusetts General Hospital. He was 76 years old.
