= Ernest C. Stasiun =

American politician (1923–1992)

Member of the Massachusetts Governor's Council from the 1st District
- In office 1957–1965
- Preceded by: Joseph P. Dupont
- Succeeded by: Nicholas W. Mitchell

Personal details
- Born: February 20, 1923 New Bedford, Massachusetts
- Died: February 12, 1992 (aged 68)
- Party: Democratic
- Education: Alliance College; Brown University; Columbia University

Ernest C. Stasiun (February 20, 1923 – February 12, 1992) was an American politician who served on the Massachusetts Governor's Council from 1959 to 1965. He was convicted of bribery in 1965.

== Early life ==
Stasiun was born on February 20, 1923, in New Bedford, Massachusetts. During World War II he served in the United States Navy. He graduated from New Bedford High School, Alliance College, Brown University, and Columbia University and afterwards worked as a Doctor of optometry.

== Politics ==
Stasiun's first run for political office was in 1958, when he ran for the vacant Governor's Council seat in the 1st District. He defeated Republican Frankland W. L. Miles 55% to 45% in what was seen as a tossup race. In 1960 he was a candidate for Lieutenant Governor of Massachusetts, but withdrew in favor of Edward F. McLaughlin Jr. and was reelected to the Governor's Council. In 1963, Stasiun attempted to secure the position of registrar of motor vehicles after the Council refused to approve Governor Endicott Peabody's nominee.

== Bribery convictions ==
On September 11, 1963, Stasiun, his cousin, and the former city registrar of Fall River, Massachusetts, were indicted on bribery charges related to the leasing of the Registry of Motor Vehicles office in New Bedford. On January 28, 1964, he was found guilty and sentenced to two years in jail. While out on appeal, Stasiun ran for reelection. He was defeated in the Democratic primary by Nicholas W. Mitchell. On April 22, 1965, the Massachusetts Supreme Judicial Court found that Judge Amadeo V. Sgarzi issued erroneous instructions to the jury and ordered a new trial for Stasiun and his co-defendants.

On October 13, 1964, Stasiun was one of four councilors indicted for soliciting and accepting bribes from Governor Foster Furcolo in exchange for voting in favor of the reappointment of state public works commissioner Anthony N. DiNatale. On September 28, 1965, Stasiun, Joseph Ray Crimmins, Raymond F. Sullivan, and Michael Favulli were found guilty of conspiracy and requesting bribes in connection with DiNatale's reappointment. He was sentenced to two years in jail and began serving his sentence on October 22, 1965. 3 days later he pleaded guilty in the Registry of Motor Vehicles case and was sentenced two years to be served concurrently with his other sentence. He was granted patrol on May 5, 1966. Stasiun died on February 12, 1992.
