= East Main Street Cemetery =

Historic cemetery in Massachusetts, United States

- U.S. National Register of Historic Places
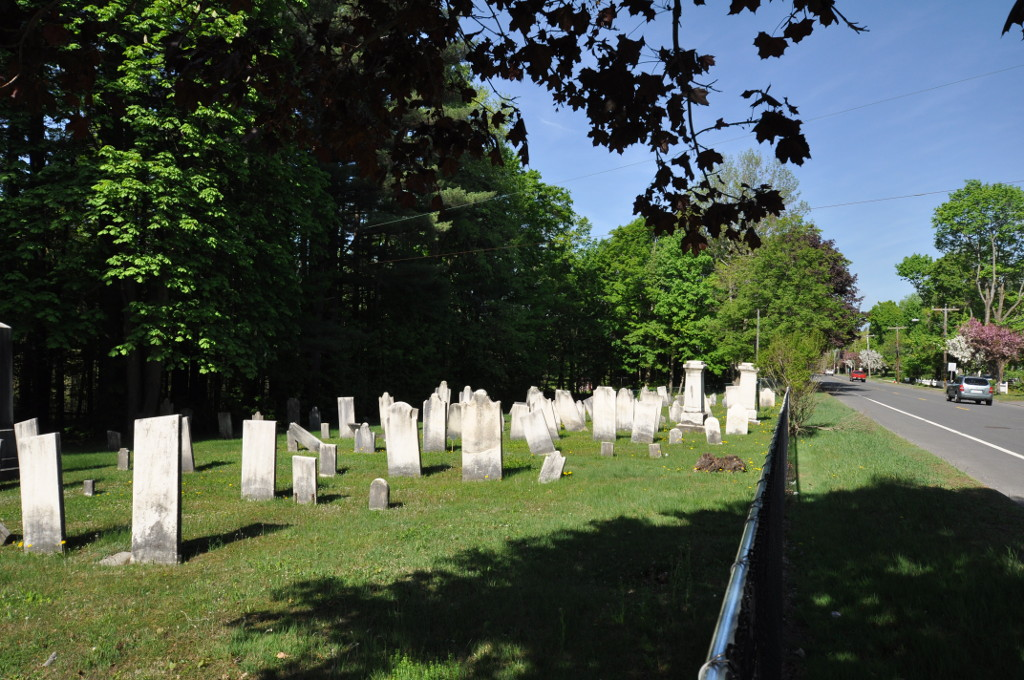

- Location within Massachusetts Location within the United States
- Location: Dalton, Massachusetts
- Coordinates: 42°28′24″N 73°9′5″W
- Built: 1781
- Architect: AT; Ely
- NRHP reference No.: 00000567
- Added to NRHP: June 2, 2000

The East Main Street Cemetery is a historic cemetery on East Main Street in Dalton, Massachusetts. The cemetery is one of the oldest in the town, with grave markers dating to the 1780s. It was founded on land owned by the Chamberlin family, whose identified graves make up about 20 percent of roughly 250 gravesites. The cemetery was listed on the National Register of Historic Places in 2000.

== History ==
Recorded settlement of what is now Dalton, Massachusetts began in 1755, and the town was incorporated in 1784. The Chamberlin family, who were among its early settlers, owned the land along what is now East Main Street, and set aside this parcel of land as a burial ground. The oldest gravestone with a date is marked 1781; earlier burials are possible, but lack documentation and earlier gravestones may have been vandalized or stolen.

Some time in the early 19th century (definitely by 1830) the town assumed ownership of the cemetery. The cemetery was used most heavily in the mid-19th century, with usage declining in favor of the Main Street Cemetery (also listed on the National Register of Historic Places), which was laid out in the rural cemetery style that had come into fashion. In contrast, burial practices at East Main Street continued to follow the early traditions, with simple headstones and a graves laid out in relatively straight rows. The last burial at East Main Street took place in 1895. In 1887 the town was asked to consider relocating the bodies in the cemetery to Main Street, but no vote was held on the matter.

== Facilities ==
The cemetery is a plot of 2 acres (0.81 ha). Graves are arranged in rows emanating from a central aisle. In its early days the boundaries of the cemetery were marked by stone walls, but these were replaced in the 19th century by wood fencing, and chain link fencing in 1985. The stone gate marking the entrance is the most prominent feature of the cemetery. Most of the gravestones are modest in size and decoration; there are only five significant markers. The two largest of these flank the entrance gate, and are miod 19th century monuments for Chamberlin family members. A similarly styled monument to those two commemorates the Maynard family, while a squat obelisk in the tenth row marks graves of the Cleveland family. The most ornate marker is for James Bardin (died 1855): it has a high pedestal supporting a round column, topped by an urn and encircled by a wreath.

Most of the cemetery's stones are not in very good condition. Many have been vandalized, and a number may have been stolen, given that surveys over the years show declining numbers of stones. Many stones have become difficult or impossible to read due to weathering, and some broken stones have simply been placed further into the ground, obscuring writing on the buried portions.

== See also ==
- National Register of Historic Places listings in Berkshire County, Massachusetts
