= Winthrop M. Crane =

American politician (1853–1920)

Winthrop Murray Crane
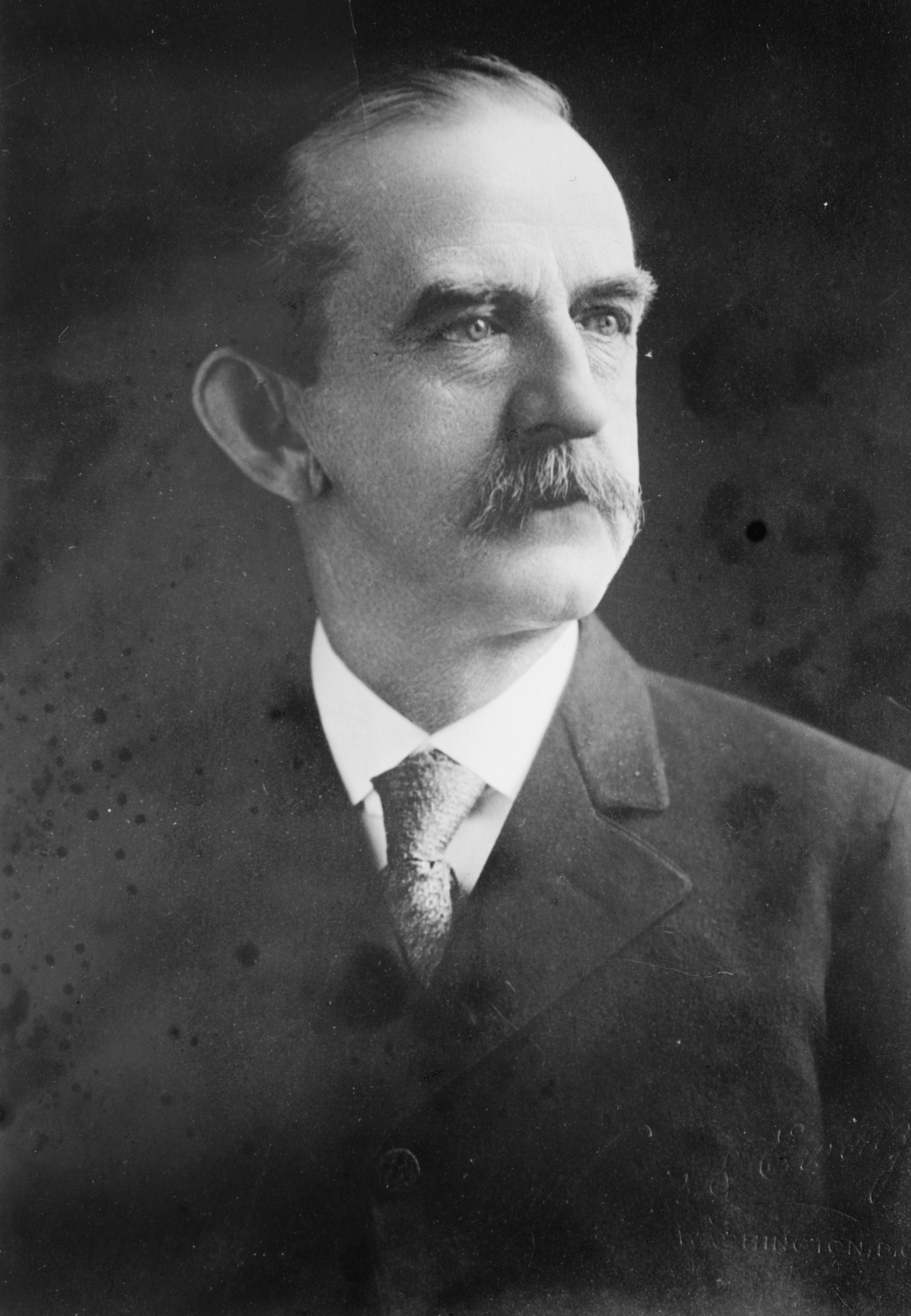

United States Senator from Massachusetts
- In office October 12, 1904 – March 3, 1913
- Preceded by: George F. Hoar
- Succeeded by: John W. Weeks

40th Governor of Massachusetts
- In office January 4, 1900 – January 8, 1903
- Lieutenant: John L. Bates
- Preceded by: Roger Wolcott
- Succeeded by: John L. Bates

37th Lieutenant Governor of Massachusetts
- In office 1897–1900
- Governor: Roger Wolcott
- Preceded by: Roger Wolcott
- Succeeded by: John L. Bates

Personal details
- Born: April 23, 1853 Dalton, Massachusetts, U.S.
- Died: October 2, 1920 (aged 67) Dalton, Massachusetts, U.S.
- Party: Republican
- Spouse(s): Mary Benner (1880—84); Josephine Porter Boardman (1884—1920)
- Children: Winthrop Murray Crane II; Stephen Crane; Bruce Crane; Louise Crane

Winthrop Murray Crane (commonly referred to as W. Murray Crane or simply Murray Crane; April 23, 1853 – October 2, 1920) was an American businessman and Republican Party politician who served as the 40th governor of Massachusetts from 1900 to 1903 and represented that state in the United States Senate from 1904 to 1913.

In 1879, he secured his family company, paper manufacturer Crane & Co., an exclusive government contract to supply the paper for United States currency, a monopoly the company holds to this day. During the 1890s he became increasingly active in state Republican politics, and became a dominant figure in the local, state, and national party. He was successively elected the 37th lieutenant governor of Massachusetts (in 1896) and 40th governor (in 1899). In 1904, he was appointed to the United States Senate and served until 1913.

Crane advised Presidents Theodore Roosevelt and William Howard Taft. His success as Governor in defusing a Teamsters strike prompted Roosevelt to bring him in as a negotiator to resolve the Coal Strike of 1902. He refused repeated offers for cabinet-level positions and was known to dislike campaigning and giving speeches. Near the end of his career, he served as a political mentor to future President Calvin Coolidge, who was elected vice president one month after Crane's death.

== Early life ==
Winthrop Murray Crane was born in Dalton, Massachusetts on April 23, 1853. His mother was Louise Fanny Laflin. His father, Zenas Marshall Crane, was owner of the Crane Paper Company, a dominant economic force in the small community and a major producer of paper products.

== Early career ==
=== Crane & Co. ===
In 1870, Crane entered the family business and, with his brother Zenas Jr., presided over a period of significant growth of the company.

In 1872, Crane secured a major contract for the supply of wrapping paper to the Winchester Repeating Arms Company, and followed this up in 1879, with an exclusive contract to paper for the Federal Reserve Notes, the currency of the United States. The Crane Company continues to be the sole supplier of currency paper to the federal government today.

The company continued to grow throughout the 1890s, and Crane amassed a significant fortune by investing in the Otis Elevator Company and in American Telephone and Telegraph Company.

=== Entry to politics ===
In 1892, Crane was elected as a delegate to the Republican National Convention as a candidate of the "Young Republican Club," a faction of Massachusetts Republicans, organized in 1888, who would come to dominate the state party apparatus and political landscape.

After the convention, Crane was elected Chairman of the Massachusetts Republican Party. Although he was from western Massachusetts, he was viewed by the party's mainly eastern leadership as a "safe" and moderate choice, who would be good at fundraising. Although Crane was politically conservative, he was adept at negotiating the differences between the wings of the party and refused to become deeply entrenched into either the progressive or conservative wing. He was also well known as a somewhat taciturn politician, who did not make stump speeches while campaigning, and is not recorded as having made speeches on the floors of the legislative bodies in which he served.

== Governor of Massachusetts ==
In 1896, Crane was elected Lieutenant Governor of Massachusetts, serving under another Young Republican, Roger Wolcott. The office was part of a traditional cursus honorum in Massachusetts Republican politics, with the next step being the Governorship. When Wolcott retired after his traditional third one-year term, Crane ran for Governor. He won a comfortable victory against a disorganized Democratic opposition and was reelected the next two years by wide margins.

Crane's tenure as governor was marked by fiscal conservatism, business-like management, and relatively little reform. His leadership was characterized as non-partisan and was viewed with favor even by Democrats.

In 1902, Crane successfully negotiated a Teamsters strike, and was then called in by President Theodore Roosevelt to mediate the 1902 Coal Strike, which threatened national winter coal supplies.

He vetoed legislative authorization of a merger between the Boston Elevated Railway and the West End Street Railway, in part because it did not contain a clause calling for a referendum by the affected populations. He did, however, sign legislation authorizing the lease of the Fitchburg Railroad to the Boston and Maine Railroad, and of the Boston and Albany Railroad to the New York Central Railroad. Crane was a major shareholder in the New York Central.

Crane was hosting President Roosevelt in Pittsfield on September 3, 1902, when a speeding trolley car rammed into the open-air horse carriage carrying Roosevelt. The accident killed the president's Secret Service agent, William Craig.

== United States Senator ==
Crane was appointed October 12, 1904 by Governor John L. Bates to continue the U.S. Senate term of the late George F. Hoar. He was then elected in a January 18, 1905 special election to finish the term. He was re-elected in 1907 and served until 1913.

As Senator, Crane was famous for his lack of public statements and behind-the-scenes maneuvering. Senator from New York Chauncey Depew wrote that Crane "never made a speech. I do not remember that he made a motion. Yet he was the most influential member of that body." Calvin Coolidge observed that "his influence was very great, but that it was of an intangible nature." He was also known to often choose inaction over action on many matters, with a common answer to requests for advice being "Do nothing. As U.S. Senator, he used his influence to help secure the state's approval of a merger of the Boston and Maine with the New York, New Haven and Hartford Railroad.

He was an opponent of reciprocity (reduced tariffs) with Canada and the Dominion of Newfoundland, working to water down provisions of a proposed treaty.

In 1905, Crane may have been instrumental in denying Democrat William L. Douglas a second term as governor. Douglas, a successful and widely-known shoe manufacturer, won election in 1904 with labor support and high name recognition. According to Charles S. Hamlin, Republicans discovered that Douglas had apparently fraudulently acquired an honorable discharge after deserting during the Civil War. The quid pro quo for this information not being revealed, supposedly engineered by Crane and Senator Henry Cabot Lodge, was that Douglas would not run again.

In the 1908 presidential election, Crane expressed early support for William Howard Taft, but later came to oppose Taft, believing him a weak candidate. This placed him in opposition to fellow Senator Henry Cabot Lodge, a strong Taft supporter, in a struggle for control of the state delegation to the national convention. Crane preferred to leave the delegates without formal instruction as to how they should vote, while Lodge preferred that they be required to pledge for Taft. Crane won Lodge's support for an uncommitted delegation in exchange for the election of John Davis Long, a Taft supporter, as an at-large delegate. Crane ultimately reconciled with both Taft and Lodge. He became one of Taft's closest advisors after his election and worked to secure Lodge's reelection in 1911.

In the 1912 general election, the Republican Party was divided by Roosevelt's defection, and conservative elements of the party dominated the state legislature's caucus. This resulted in the election in early 1913 of the ultraconservative John W. Weeks over Crane for the Senate seat.

== Personal life and death ==
In 1880, Crane married Mary Benner. She died in 1884 giving birth to their only child, Winthrop Murray Crane Jr.

In 1906, Crane married socialite Josephine Porter Boardman. She was 20 years his junior and from a politically connected family. They had three children:

- Stephen
- Bruce Crane (b. 1909), who later served as president of Crane & Co. and a member of the Massachusetts Governor's Council
- Louise Crane (b. 1913), poet, publisher, and philanthropist

Crane died at his home in Dalton on October 2, 1920.

== Notes ==
Party political offices
Preceded by Roger Wolcott	Republican nominee for Governor of Massachusetts; 1899, 1900, 1901	Succeeded by John L. Bates
Political offices
Preceded by Roger Wolcott	Lieutenant Governor of Massachusetts; 1897–1900	Succeeded by John L. Bates
Preceded by Roger Wolcott	Governor of Massachusetts; 1900–1903	Succeeded by John L. Bates
U.S. Senate
Preceded by George Frisbie Hoar	U.S. senator (Class 2) from Massachusetts; 1904–1913; Served alongside: Henry Cabot Lodge	Succeeded by John W. Weeks
