= Robert Treat Paine (philanthropist) =

American lawyer and philanthropist

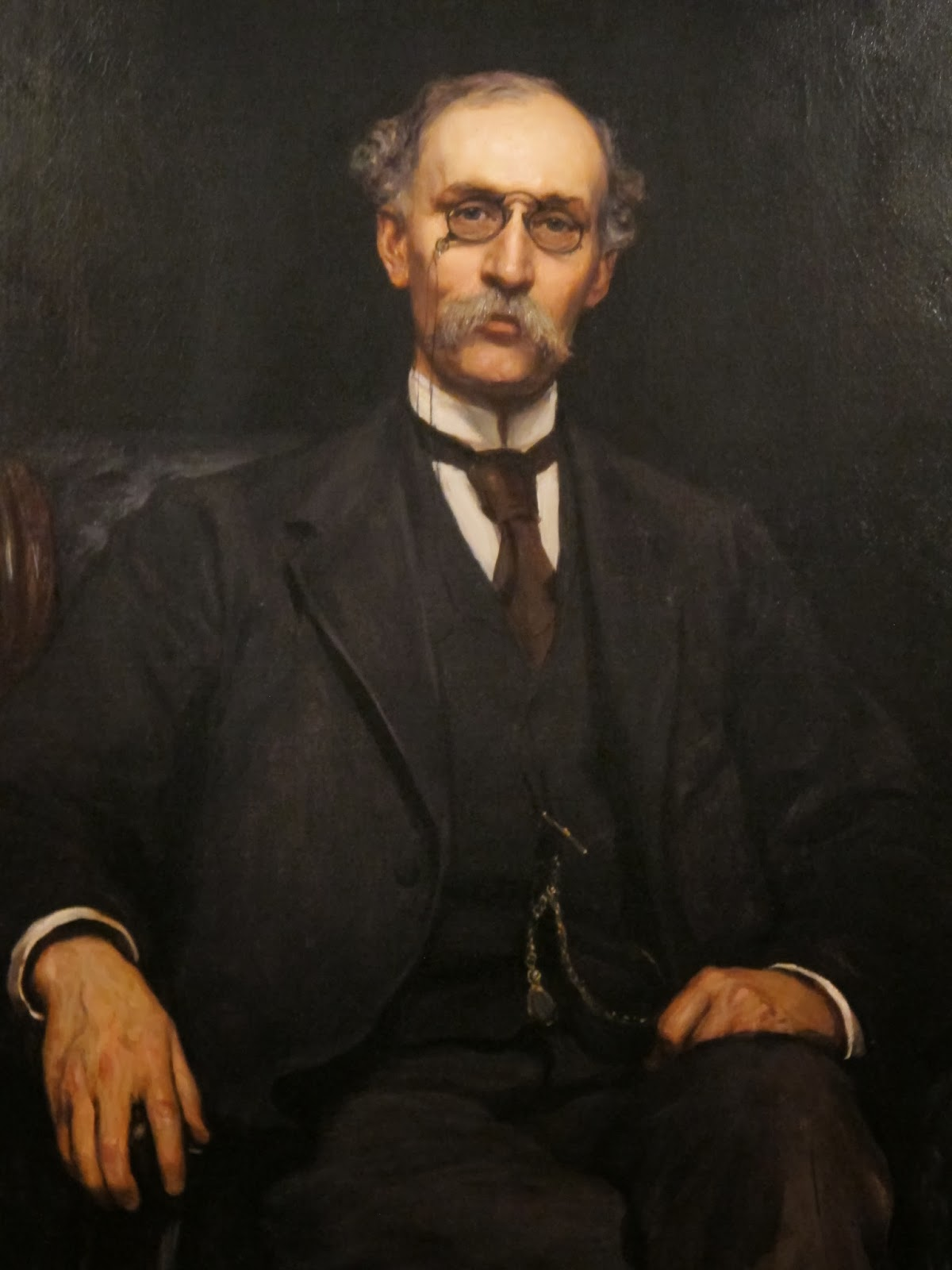
- Portrait of Robert Treat Paine by Hubert von Herkomer (1884)
- Born: October 28, 1835; Boston, Massachusetts, US
- Died: August 11, 1910 (aged 74); Waltham, Massachusetts, US
- Burial place: Mount Auburn Cemetery
- Education: Boston Latin School; Harvard College (1855); Harvard Law School (1856)
- Occupations: Lawyer; philanthropist; social reformer
- Relatives: Charles Jackson Paine (brother); Lyman Paine (grandson); Robert Treat Paine (great-grandfather); Robert Treat Paine III (great-grandson)

Signature
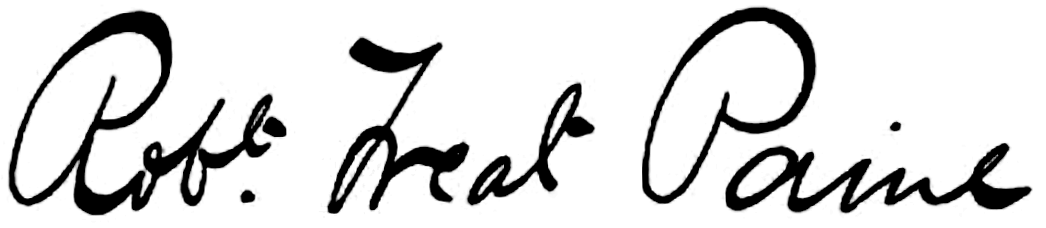

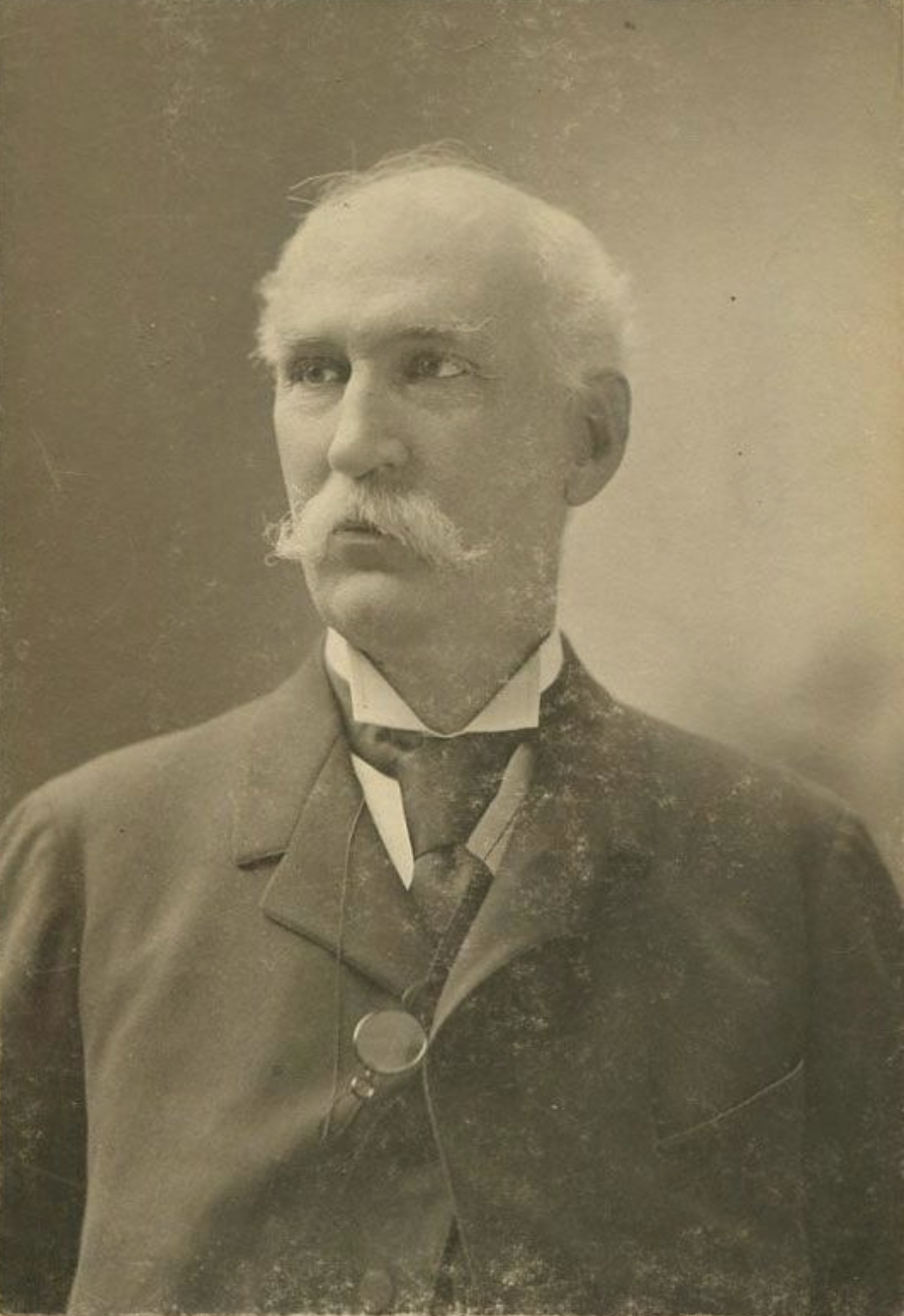
Portrait of Paine by Joseph Gaylord Gessford

Robert Treat Paine (October 28, 1835 – August 11, 1910) was an American Boston-based lawyer, philanthropist, and social reformer. He is most widely known for his work as chairman of the building committee of Boston's Trinity Church in Copley Square, for his leadership of 19th century Boston philanthropists, for his summer home in Waltham, Massachusetts, and for his experiments in building housing for low- and middle-income workers.

== Biography ==
Paine was born October 28, 1835, in Boston, Massachusetts, to Charles Cushing Paine (1808–1874) and Fanny Cabot Jackson (1812–1878). His brother was Charles Jackson Paine and his great-grandfather was Robert Treat Paine, a signer of the Declaration of Independence. Paine was also descendant of Robert Treat, and Hugues de Payens, and was great-grandfather of zoologist Robert Treat Paine III. He attended Boston Latin School and graduated at the age of 15. Paine graduated from Harvard College in 1855 as "first scholar in his class" alongside his friend Francis C. Barlow. A year later in 1856, Paine went on to graduate from Harvard Law School.

For two years after college, Paine traveled throughout Europe "gaining experience and broadening his mind." Upon his return to Boston, he entered the offices of Richard Henry Dana Jr. and Francis E. Parker. In 1859, Paine was admitted to the Suffolk County bar. For many years, Paine was counsel for Calumet and Hecla Mining Company as well as for the Chicago, Burlington and Quincy Railroad as it expanded westward.

Paine, having invested in real estate, mining, and railroad enterprises, retired in 1870 and devoted his time to humanitarian work. From 1872 to 1876, Paine served on the subcommittee in charge of the construction of Trinity Church in Boston. Paine was also a prominent member of the Associated Charities of Boston and served as the organization's first president in 1878. In 1879 he organized the Wells Memorial Institute, a workingman's club to promote social interaction, and in 1890 he built the People's Institute, another workingman's club with the same purpose. In 1891, Paine became president of the American Peace Society and in 1897, president of the Episcopalian Club of Massachusetts. He was also a member and director of the Watch and Ward Society as well as vice-president of the Children's Aid Society. Additionally, Paine was a trustee of the Episcopal Theological School in Cambridge and one of the trustees of donations to the Protestant Episcopal Church.

On April 24, 1862, Paine married Lydia Williams Lyman, granddaughter of Theodore Lyman II. They had seven children. Paine's summer home was known as Stonehurst and was located in Waltham, Massachusetts. It was a collaboration between Henry Hobson Richardson and Frederick Law Olmsted.

Paine's brick row-house development on Greenwich and Sussex streets in Roxbury, Massachusetts, is listed on the National Register of Historic Places as part of the Frederick Douglass Square Historic District. Another of his housing experiments, an 1890s 100-house subdivision between Round Hill and Sunnyside streets in Jamaica Plain, has been deemed eligible for nomination to the National Register.

== See also ==
- Colonial ancestor Maj. Robert Treat, a Governor of the Connecticut Colony. Was one of the principal founders of Newark, New Jersey.
