= Falmouth Hospital =

Hospital in Massachusetts, US

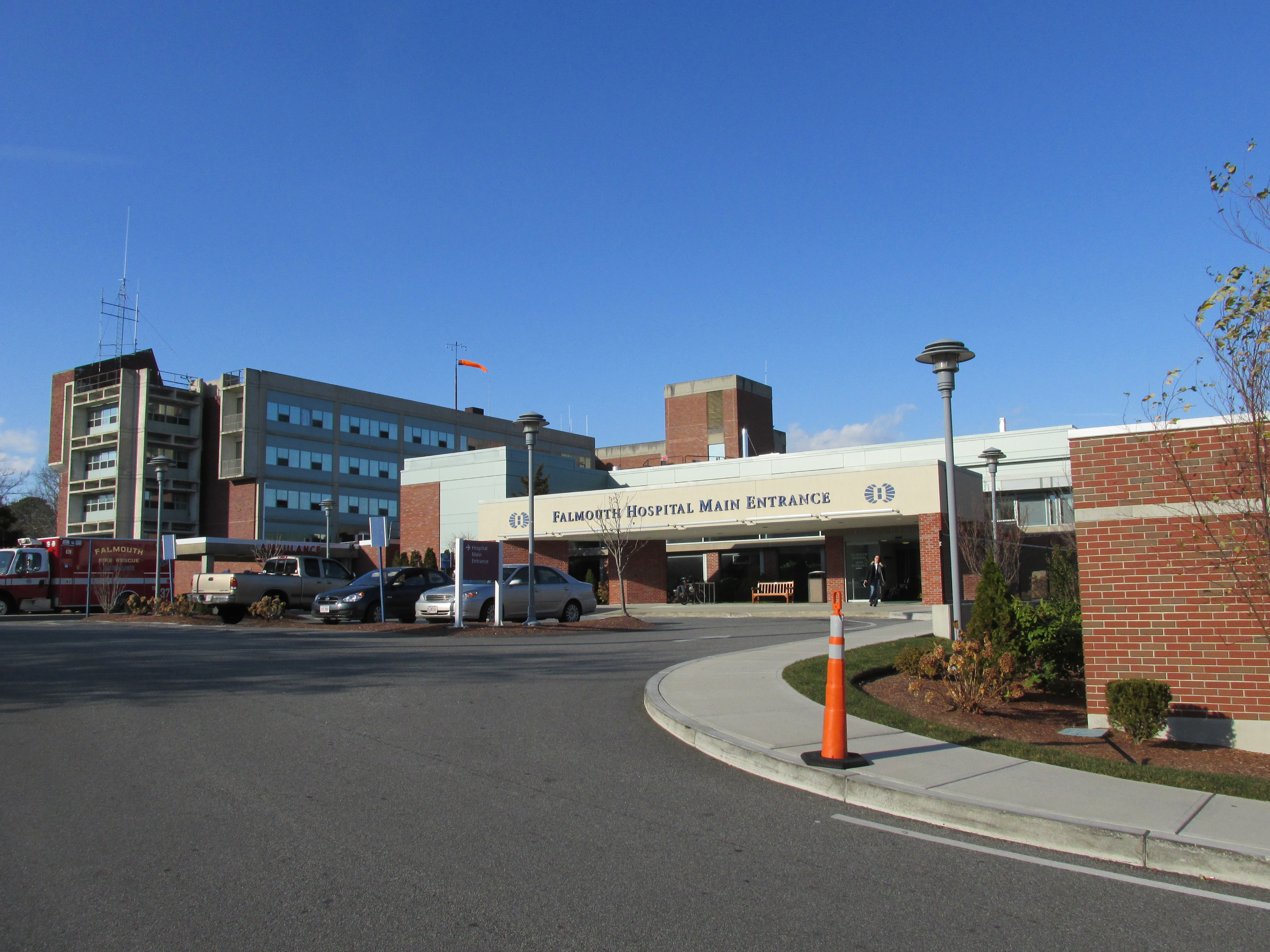
- Falmouth Hospital

Geography
- Location: Falmouth, Massachusetts, Massachusetts, United States
- Coordinates: 41°33′50″N 70°37′19″W

Organization
- Type: Private

Services
- Beds: 95

Helipads
- Helipad: (FAA LID: MA37)
Number	Length		Surface
Number	ft	m	Surface
H1	50	15	Asphalt/concrete

History
- Founded: 1963

Links
- Website: http://www.capecodhealth.org/hospitals-facilities/falmouth-hospital/
- Lists: Hospitals in Massachusetts

Falmouth Hospital is a private medical center located in Falmouth, Massachusetts founded in 1963. It has 95 beds. Falmouth Hospital is located just west of Palmer Avenue (Route 28) just south off of TerHeun Drive.

The Emergency Department is one of the busiest in Massachusetts, providing emergency services to more than 40,000 patients on an annual basis.

In 1996 it merged with Cape Cod Hospital to form the unified Cape Cod Healthcare organization.

== History ==
Falmouth Hospital opened May 2, 1963 with 58 beds. A third floor was added in 1969 increasing capacity to 88 beds. Then further expansions in 1971, 1976, and 1977 added offices, a helicopter landing pad, and other facilities. In 1983 a fourth floor addition was completed along with x-ray, laboratory, and emergency services facilities. In 1996, an outpatient and maternity center was added.

== Hospital rating data ==
The HealthGrades website contains the latest quality data for Falmouth Hospital, as of 2015. For this rating section three different types of data from HealthGrades are presented: quality ratings for twenty-two inpatient conditions and procedures, thirteen patient safety indicators, percentage of patients giving the hospital a 9 or 10 (the two highest possible ratings).

For inpatient conditions and procedures, there are three possible ratings: worse than expected, as expected, better than expected. For this hospital the data for this category is:

- Worse than expected - 2
- As expected - 16
- Better than expected - 4

For patient safety indicators, there are the same three possible ratings. For this hospital safety indicators were rated as:

- Worse than expected - 1
- As expected -12
- Better than expected - 0

Data for patients giving this hospital a 9 or 10 are:

- Patients rating this hospital as a 9 or 10 - 71%
- Patients rating hospitals as a 9 or 10 nationally - 69%

== Miscellaneous ==
Billionaire Peter Nicholas was a benefactor and used the hospital's heliport.
