= Charles Bierer Wrightsman =

American oil executive and arts patron

- Born: June 13, 1895; Pawnee, Oklahoma Territory, U.S.
- Died: May 27, 1986 (aged 90); Manhattan, New York, U.S.
- Education: Columbia University (BA); Stanford University; Phillips Exeter Academy
- Occupations: Oil executive and arts patron
- Spouses: Irene Stafford (m. 1922, divorced) Jayne Kirkman Larkin (m. 1944)
- Children: 2

Charles Bierer Wrightsman (June 13, 1895 – May 27, 1986) was an American oil executive and arts patron. His second wife, Jayne was also an arts patron.

== Personal life ==
Charles Bierer Wrightsman was born on June 13, 1895, in Pawnee, Oklahoma. He was the son of Charles John Wrightsman (1868–1959), an Oklahoma oilman and lawyer, and Edna (née Wrightsman) Wrightsman (1872–1950). He attended Phillips Exeter Academy, Stanford University, then transferred to Columbia University, joining the class of 1918. He became president of Standard Oil of Kansas. He married twice, first to Irene Dill Stafford (1896–1960), with whom he had two daughters: Irene Wrightsman and Charlene Stafford Wrightsman (1927–1963) the latter of whom, like her father, would also marry twice, first to actor Helmut Dantine and second to newspaper columnist Igor Cassini. Wrightsman's second wife was the above-noted Jayne Kirkman Larkin (1919–2019).

Wrightsman had homes in London and Palm Beach at which he frequently hosted John F. Kennedy.

Wrightsman died at his home on Fifth Avenue in Manhattan on May 27, 1986.

=== Art collection ===
On retirement, he used his money to buy artworks for his private collection and for the Metropolitan Museum of Art, most notably donating Gerard David's Virgin and Child with Four Angels and Vermeer's Portrait of a Young Woman, along with works by El Greco, Giovanni Battista Tiepolo, Georges de La Tour, Rubens and Jacques-Louis David. He also funded the Museum's eight Wrightsman Rooms, furnished and decorated in the 18th century French style, and three further galleries for objets-d'art and furniture from that period.

In 1961 he successfully bid $392,000 for Goya's Portrait of the Duke of Wellington. However, the UK government blocked the purchase and the painting was instead sold to the National Gallery in London to enable it to stay in the United Kingdom.

=== Polo ===
In the 1930s, Wrightsman was known as a tournament polo player and the owner of championship polo ponies.
