= Victoria Kent =

Spanish lawyer and republican politician

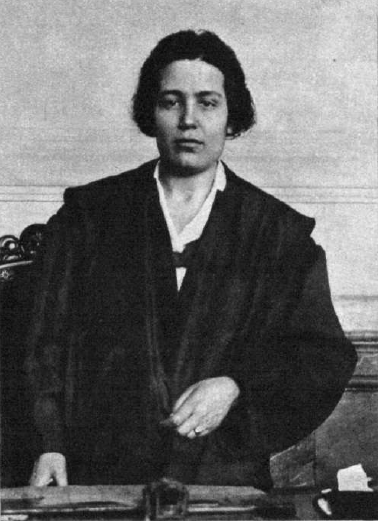
- Born: March 6, 1897
- Died: September 25, 1987 (aged 90)

Victoria Kent Siano (March 6, 1897 – September 25, 1987) was a Spanish lawyer and republican politician.

== Biography ==
Kent was born in Málaga, Spain. She was affiliated to the Radical Socialist Republican Party and came to fame in 1930 for defending – at a court martial – Álvaro de Albornoz, who shortly afterward would go on to become minister of justice and later the future president of the Republican government in exile (1947 to 1949 and 1949 to 1951). She became a member of the first Parliament of the Second Spanish Republic in 1931. That same year, the President of the Republic, Niceto Alcalá-Zamora, appointed her Director General of Prisons, a post she held until 1934, and she actively continued the reforms in the prison service that had been started by Concepción Arenal.

Kent was against giving women the right to vote immediately, arguing that, as Spanish women lacked at that moment enough social and political education to vote responsibly, they would be very much influenced by the Catholic priests, causing damage to left-wing parties. She got into more controversy on this subject with another feminist in the parliament, Clara Campoamor. This caused her certain unpopularity and, when women were given the right to vote, she lost her seat – as she had predicted – to the conservative majority in 1933.

After the Spanish Civil War, Kent went into exile in Mexico, but soon moved on to the United States. In New York City she published the Ibérica review from 1954 to 1974, which featured news for Spaniards exiled in the United States. She died in New York in 1987, and is buried alongside her partner Louise Crane at Umpawaug Cemetery, Redding, Connecticut.

Colleges in Málaga, Fuenlabrada, Marbella, Torrejón de Ardoz (Instituto de Educación Secundaria Victoria Kent), and a railway station in her hometown of Málaga have been named after Kent. Historians have not adequately discussed her lesbianism.

== Political life ==
Shortly after her arrival in Madrid, Kent joined the Asociación Nacional de Mujeres Españolas y la Juventud Universitaria Femenina (a women's rights organization), directed by Maria Espinosa de los Monteros. She represented this entity at a conference in Prague in 1921. After affiliating the Radical Socialist Republican Party, she was elected as a member of the Parliament of the Republican-Socialist Conjunction of the Republican Court in 1931. In the election on February 16, 1936, Kent was elected member of the Parliament in Jaen, for the Republican Left, which was a part of the Popular Front. She was also vice president of the Lyceum Club, beginning in 1926.

== Opposition to women's suffrage ==
One of the most outstanding and controversial moments in Kent's personal and political life would be her opposition to women's suffrage before the Spanish Parliament in 1931, when she faced another feminist, Clara Campoamor, in a dialectical and significant battle on an issue that would have a great effect on the rights of women. She declared that Spanish women were not socially and politically prepared to vote. According to her, Spanish women were also heavily influenced by the Church and their vote would be conservative and harmful to the Republic. On the contrary, Campoamor defended that women had the right to vote, as she defended the equality of all human beings. After this debate, Kent lost her popularity and therefore did not take part in Parliament in the 1933 elections. Spanish women were granted universal suffrage in 1933. The 1933 elections were won by the right wing as it was united.

== Spanish Civil War ==
Due to the outbreak of the Spanish Civil War in 1936, Kent was forced to go into exile like many other Republicans. As she was going into exile, she helped children whose fathers were soldiers about to be evacuated. She took refuge in Paris, and was named First Secretary of the Spanish Embassy in the capital so that she could continue taking care of refugee children. She was also responsible for the creation of shelters and nurseries for the same purpose.

== Second World War ==
Kent remained in Paris until the end of the Civil War, helping Spanish exiles in the capital and those awaiting their departure to America. However, at the beginning of the Second World War Paris was occupied on June 14, 1940, by the Wehrmacht (German Army). Kent was forced to take refuge in the Mexican Embassy for a year. She was put on trial in absentia by Franco's courts and in October 1943, when she was still in Paris, she was sentenced to prison for 30 years, expelling her from Spanish territory. Fortunately, the Red Cross gave her an apartment in Boulogne (north of France), where she lived until 1944, protected by a fake identity. During that time, "Madame Duval" being her false identity, she wrote Cuatro Años en París, a novel with autobiographical aspects reflected in the main character, Placido.

== Exile ==
Kent went into exile in Mexico in 1948. She worked there for two years teaching criminal law at the university. In 1950, she was hired by the UN, and left Mexico for New York, where she worked for the social defense and led a study based on the poor conditions of prisons in Latin America. Between 1951 and 1957, she left her previous job and became minister without portfolio of the Second Spanish Republic's government in exile. This made her the second female minister after Federica Montseny. She also founded the magazine "Iberica," which appealed to all the exiles that lived far from their homeland like her. This magazine was financed by her partner Louise Crane for twenty years (1954–1974). In 1977, forty years after her exile in France, Kent returned to Spain and was welcomed with affection and admiration. However, she returned to New York where she spent her last days, and died on September 26, 1987. In 1986, she was awarded the medal of San Raimundo de Peñafort, but because of her old age, she was not able to receive it in person.

== Works ==
- Cuatros años en París (1940–1944), (1978)

== Bibliography ==
- Miguel Ángel Villena, Victoria Kent, una pasión republicana, Barcelona, Debate, 2007, 336 p.
- María Dolores Ramos, Victoria Kent (1892–1987), Ediciones del Orto, 1999, 96 p.
- Carmen de la Guardia, Victoria Kent y Louise Crane en Nueva York. Un exilio compartido, Madrid, Silex, 2016, 327 p.
- Maria Telo Nunez, Concepcion Arenal y Victoria Kent: La prisiones, vida y obra, Instituto de la Mujer, 1995, 137 p.
- Angela Kershaw & Angela Kimyongur, Women in Europe Between the Wars: Politics, Culture and Society, Ashgate Pub Co, 2007, 249 p.

== See also ==
- First women lawyers around the world
