= Cornelius F. Kiernan =

American politician

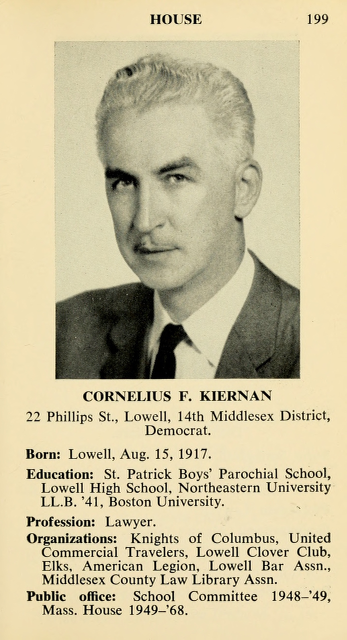

Majority Leader of the Massachusetts House of Representatives
- In office 1958–1962
- Preceded by: John F. Thompson
- Succeeded by: John Davoren

Personal details
- Born: August 15, 1917 Lowell, Massachusetts, U.S.
- Died: January 20, 1996 (aged 78) Lowell, Massachusetts
- Education: Boston University

Cornelius Francis Kiernan (August 15, 1917 – January 20, 1996) was an American politician and judge who served as a member of the Massachusetts House of Representatives and a special justice in the Somerville and Lowell District Courts.

== Early life ==
Kiernan was born on August 15, 1917, in Lowell, Massachusetts. He graduated from St. Patrick's Boys' Parochial School, Lowell High School, Northeastern University, and Boston University. He earned his law degree in 1941. "Connie" as he was known to his friends was the fifth of seven children of William R. Kiernan and Ann Doyle. His Father, Will, was a pharmacist in Lowell with a Drug Store located on the corner of School and Broadway in the Acre. During the depression, it was not unusual for those in need to receive medicine from Kiernan's Drug Store free of charge. Like all of the Kiernan boys, Connie worked in the drug store taking the night shifts to give his father a chance for rest. In 1942, he joined the war effort by volunteering for the Army. When Connie returned from Service he ran for School Committee and began a successful law practice in downtown Lowell.

== Political career ==
Kiernan served on the Lowell School Committee from 1948 to 1949. He then served as a member of the Massachusetts House of Representatives from 1949 to 1974. From 1958 to 1962 he was the House Majority Leader. He resigned as a Majority Leader to challenge incumbent John F. Thompson for the position of Speaker. During the Speaker's election, Governor-elect Endicott Peabody took the unprecedented step of endorsing Michael Paul Feeney, a fellow liberal Democrat, over Thompson. After Feeney failed to defeat Thompson on the first ballot, most of Feeney's supporters backed Kiernan as a compromise candidate. On the sixth and final ballot he lost to Thompson 118 votes to 78, with 28 votes going to Republican leader Sidney Curtiss and 24 members not voting. Kiernan's support was divided almost equally between anti-Thompson Democrats and Republicans, with 44 Democrats and 34 Republicans voting for him on the final ballot.

From 1966 to 1974, Kiernan served as Chairman of the House Judiciary Committee. He was considered an extremely sharp legal mind and often had a line of legislators at his desk asking for help in putting through a proposed Bill. He was known to be bipartisan in his advice and guidance.

== Judicial service ==
Kiernan was nominated a special justice in the Somerville District Court by Governor Francis W. Sargent, a Republican. His nomination was approved by the Massachusetts Governor's Council on February 20, 1974, and he was sworn in on March 20. Later that year, Sargent appointed Kiernan to the same position in the Lowell District Court. One of his congratulatory notes came from Archibald Cox and stated "I have learned more Law sitting at your feet than from any institution". In 2024, The Lowell Judicial Center was renamed The Cornelius F. Kiernan Judicial Center.

== Death ==
Kiernan died on January 20, 1996.

== See also ==
- Massachusetts legislature: 1949–1950, 1951–1952, 1953–1954, 1955–1956

Political offices
Preceded by John F. Thompson	Majority Leader of the Massachusetts House of Representatives; 1958–1962	Succeeded by John Davoren
Preceded by Daniel W. Carney	House Chairman of the Committee on the Judiciary; 1966–1974	Succeeded by Louis LeBlanc
