= Philip A. Graham =

American politician

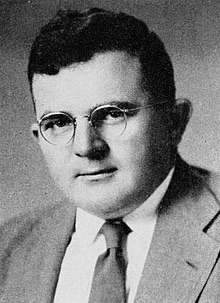
- Philip A. Graham, circa 1953

Minority Leader of the Massachusetts Senate
- In office 1963–1967
- Preceded by: Fred I. Lamson
- Succeeded by: John F. Parker

Member of the Massachusetts Senate from the 3rd Essex District
- In office 1951–1967
- Preceded by: Cornelius F. Haley
- Succeeded by: William L. Saltonstall

Personal details
- Born: May 21, 1910 Lynn, Massachusetts
- Died: November 1, 1993 (aged 83) Newbury, Massachusetts
- Party: Republican
- Profession: Farmer; Politician

Philip A. Graham was an American politician who served in the Massachusetts Senate from 1951 to 1967.

== Early life ==
Graham was born on May 21, 1910, in Lynn, Massachusetts. He attended public schools in Lynn and Swampscott and graduated from Boston University. During World War II he served in the United States Navy.

== Political career ==
Graham's political career began when he was elected to the Swampscott School Committee. He later moved to Hamilton, Massachusetts, where he worked as a turkey farmer. In 1950 he was elected to the Massachusetts Senate.

During his career in the Senate, Graham supported the creation of a state sales tax and aggressively railed against inefficiency and corruption in state government.

In 1956, Richard I. Furbush did not run for re-election and Graham sought to succeed him as Senate President. At the Republican caucus held before the floor vote, Graham defeated Newland H. Holmes fifteen votes to six. However, Holmes chose not to abide by the caucus decision and ran against Graham and Democratic leader John E. Powers for the Senate Presidency. On the first ballot, Powers received the vote of all nineteen Democrats while the Republican vote was split between Graham (sixteen votes) and Holmes (five votes). Powers preferred Holmes to Graham and after a lengthy caucus with the Democrats, he was able to convince fifteen Democrats to support Holmes. On the second ballot, Holmes won the Presidency with twenty votes to Graham's sixteen and Powers' four.

In 1960 and 1964, Graham ran for Governor of Massachusetts, but lost the nomination to John A. Volpe.

From 1963 to 1967, Graham was the Minority Leader in the Senate. He suffered a heart attack during his final term and did not run for reelection. After he left the Senate he was appointed to an eight year term on the Massachusetts Turnpike Authority by Governor Volpe.

== Death ==
Graham died on November 1, 1993, at his home in Newbury, Massachusetts.

== See also ==
- 1951–1952 Massachusetts legislature
- 1953–1954 Massachusetts legislature
- 1955–1956 Massachusetts legislature
