= David J. O'Connor =

American politician (1924–2011)

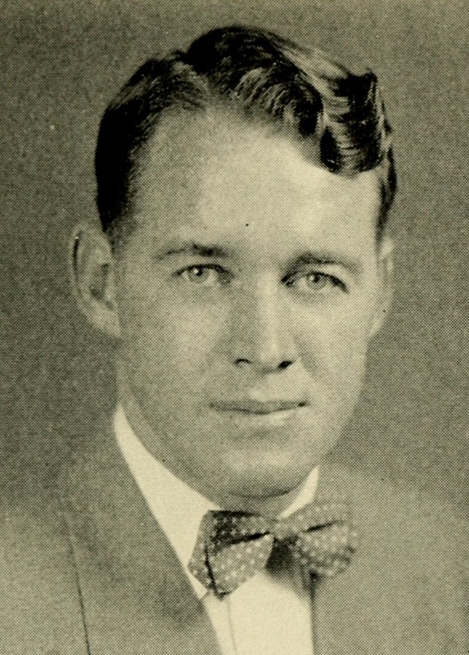

Member of the Massachusetts House of Representatives
- In office 1951–1970
- Succeeded by: Francis K. Dwyer

Personal details
- Born: November 9, 1924 Boston, Massachusetts
- Died: May 5, 2011 (aged 86) Sarasota, Florida
- Party: Democratic
- Domestic partner: Patricia Wanders (1990–2011; his death)
- Education: Staley College; Boston School of Anatomy and Embalming; University of Massachusetts Boston
- Occupation: Funeral director

David J. "Okie" O'Connor (1924–2011) was an American funeral director and politician who was a member of the Massachusetts House of Representatives from 1951 to 1970. He left the House after he was convicted of willful failure to file Federal income tax returns.

== Early life and education ==
O'Connor was born on November 9, 1924, in Boston. His father, David I. O'Connor, was a funeral director in Roxbury. He attended Mission High School, the Boston School of Business Administration, and Staley College. After becoming a state representative he attended the Boston School of Anatomy and Embalming and University of Massachusetts Boston.

After high school, O'Connor enlisted in the United States Navy. He was stationed on the USS Chester during the attack on Pearl Harbor.

== Political career ==
O'Connor first became involved in politics as a community activist in Roxbury. From 1951 to 1970 he was a member of the Massachusetts House of Representatives. During his tenure as a state representative, O'Connor's interests included finance, consumer protection, housing, and supporting the policies of Democratic governors Paul A. Dever, Foster Furcolo, and Endicott Peabody. O'Connor was a staunch supporter of the Furcolo administration and backed the governor's proposal to create a 3% sales tax. In 1960 Furcolo appointed O'Connor to a six-year term on the Boston Licensing Board.

In 1956, O'Connor helped obtain the release of a Dorchester mother of four who was arrested by Boston Police at 4:30 am for parking violations. After the incident, O'Connor helped pass a bill that would make it a crime for police to serve parking warrants between 10 pm and 7 am.

In 1958, O'Connor supported John F. Thompson, a friend and fellow World War II veteran, in his quest to become Speaker of the Massachusetts House of Representatives. O'Connor supported Thompson in spite of opposition from many powerful Democrats including John F. Kennedy, Ted Kennedy, and Endicott Peabody.

On May 31, 1960, O'Connor purchased a vacant lot abutting his funeral home for $300 at a city auction. The sale was voided after William H. McBain, who represented abutting business owner, filed a complaint. McBain claimed that he had the site under observation on the morning the auction was to take place, but did not see anyone on the lot. The Real Property Board voided the sale and order that a second auction be held. McBain, however, withdrew his complaint and did not bid at the second auction because he wanted to keep the good will of his state representative, as there were bills under consideration that could hurt the business he worked for. O'Connor purchased the property at the second auction for $800. The incident was brought before the Boston Finance Commission in 1962 after Real Property Commissioner James J. Sullivan cited the auction as one of the complaints he had to handle since taking office. No action was taken against O'Connor, however, the Finance Commission demanded the dismissal of City Auctioneer John J. McGrath and the abolition of the City Auctioneer's position.

On February 4, 1970, O'Connor was convicted of willful failure to file Federal income tax returns. According to prosecutors, O'Connor did not file income tax returns for the years 1962 and 1963, during which time he had a total income of $44,000. He was sentenced to five months in jail and fined $10,000.

== Later life and death ==
After his retirement, O'Connor resided at his former summer home in Hull, Massachusetts and at the home of his longtime partner in Nokomis, Florida. He died on May 5, 2011, in Sarasota, Florida at the age of 86.

== See also ==
- 1951–1952 Massachusetts legislature
- 1953–1954 Massachusetts legislature
- 1955–1956 Massachusetts legislature
