= Scibelli =

Scibelli is an Italian surname. Notable people with the surname include:

- Anthony M. Scibelli (1911–1998), American politician
- Joe Scibelli (1939–1991), American football player
