= Christian Herter (disambiguation) =

Christian Herter (1895–1966) was an American politician who served as Governor of Massachusetts, and Secretary of State.

Christian Herter may also refer to:

- Christian Archibald Herter (physician) (1865–1910), American physician
- Christian Herter (1839–1883), one of the Herter Brothers, 19th-century New York decorator
- Christian A. Herter Jr. (1919–2007), American diplomat, oil executive, and academic
