= 1951–1952 Massachusetts legislature =

Session of the legislature of Massachusetts, United States

157th Massachusetts General Court
←	156th	158th	→

Overview
- Legislative body: General Court
- Election: November 7, 1950

Senate
- Members: 40
- President: Richard I. Furbush (5th Middlesex)
- Party control: Republican

House
- Members: 240
- Speaker: Tip O'Neill (3rd Middlesex)
- Party control: Democrat

Sessions
- 1st: January 3, 1951 – November 17, 1951
- 2nd: January 2, 1952 – July 5, 1952 + 6-day extra session

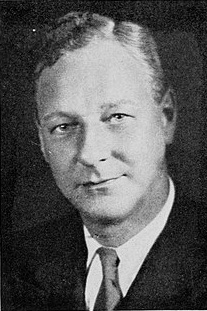
Richard Furbush, Senate president.

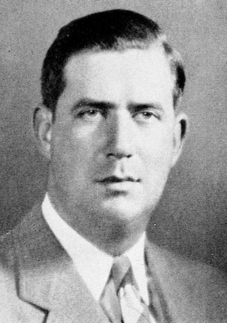
Tip O'Neill, House speaker.

Leaders of the Massachusetts General Court, 1951.

The 157th Massachusetts General Court, consisting of the Massachusetts Senate and the Massachusetts House of Representatives, met in 1951 and 1952 during the governorship of Paul A. Dever. Richard I. Furbush served as president of the Senate and Tip O'Neill served as speaker of the House.

== Senators ==
portrait	name	date of birth	district
	Paul Achin		1st Middlesex
	Philip Griggs Bowker	April 17, 1899	
	Robert Patterson Campbell	December 20, 1887	
	Ralph Vester Clampit	March 28, 1896	
	John W. Coddaire Jr.		
	John F. Collins	July 20, 1919	
	Silvio O. Conte	November 9, 1921	
	James J. Corbett	November 27, 1896	
	Leslie Bradley Cutler	March 24, 1890	
	Maurice A. Donahue	September 12, 1918	
	George Jelly Evans	February 4, 1909	
	Michael A. Flanagan	February 21, 1890	
	William Daniel Fleming	April 14, 1907	
	Richard I. Furbush	January 4, 1904	
	Joseph Francis Gibney	January 9, 1911	
	Philip A. Graham	May 21, 1910	
	Charles W. Hedges	March 27, 1901	
	Charles V. Hogan	April 12, 1897	
	Newland H. Holmes	August 30, 1891	
	Charles John Innes	June 1, 1901	
	William Joseph Keenan		
	Richard Henry Lee	December 20, 1901	
	Ralph Lerche	August 19, 1899	
	Michael LoPresti	June 25, 1908	
	Ralph Collins Mahar	January 4, 1912	
	Harry P. McAllister	April 25, 1880	
	Charles Gardner Miles	December 2, 1879	
	Daniel Francis O'Brien		
	Francis J. O'Neil		
	Charles William Olson	August 24, 1889	
	Edward C. Peirce	March 7, 1895	
	Christopher H. Phillips	December 6, 1920	
	John E. Powers	November 10, 1910	
	Andrew P. Quigley	January 13, 1926	
	George W. Stanton		
	Edward William Staves	May 9, 1887	
	Edward C. Stone	June 29, 1878	
	Charles I. Taylor	November 25, 1899	
	William Emmet White	June 1, 1900	
	Sumner G. Whittier	July 4, 1911	

== Representatives ==
portrait	name	date of birth	district
	Frank Haskell Allen	October 12, 1877	7th Worcester
	Richard James Allen	June 22, 1909	
	Charles H. Anthony	July 6, 1893	
	John A. Armstrong	June 12, 1901	
	Charles J. Artesani		
	John George Asiaf	June 30, 1900	
	Joseph A. Aspero		
	Francis Richard Atkinson		
	John Robert Ayers	February 18, 1911	
	Josiah Babcock Jr.	May 21, 1880	
	Everett Breed Bacheller	August 24, 1895	
	Earle S. Bagley	January 20, 1905	
	Clifton H. Baker	November 28, 1878	
	Cyrus Barnes	August 23, 1889	
	Michael J. Batal	September 8, 1898	
	James C. Bayley	October 28, 1908	
	Raymond H. Beach	August 11, 1888	
	John Joseph Beades	June 8, 1916	
	G. Leo Bessette	September 23, 1906	
	Charles A. Bisbee Jr.	June 8, 1918	
	Fred Arthur Blake	January 13, 1895	
	Belden Bly	September 29, 1914	
	Frank Edwin Boot	November 8, 1905	
	Samuel Joseph Boudreau		
	Everett Murray Bowker	September 17, 1901	
	Manassah E. Bradley	September 15, 1900	
	Jeremiah Francis Brennan		
	Daniel Joseph Bresnahan	September 30, 1888	
	John Cornelius Bresnahan	November 14, 1919	
	Clarence B. Brown	December 22, 1877	
	Frank Eben Brown	January 14, 1890	
	John Brox	November 16, 1910	
	Walter D. Bryan		
	James A. Burke (Massachusetts politician)	March 30, 1910	
	Harland Burke	April 22, 1888	
	Oscar Josiah Cahoon	April 29, 1912	
	Eldridge Earl Campbell		
	Harold Wilson Canavan	May 13, 1915	
	Richard Caples	December 23, 1921	
	William F. Carr	August 4, 1910	
	Michael Joseph Carroll	June 21, 1891	
	Francis X. Casey		
	Michael Catino	February 21, 1904	
	Harrison Chadwick	February 25, 1903	
	Philip Aloysius Chapman		
	Stephen T. Chmura	August 25, 1916	
	Thomas Francis Coady Jr.	May 8, 1905	
	J. Everett Collins	April 27, 1894	
	Harry Coltun		
	James Francis Condon	February 4, 1899	
	Joseph T. Conley		
	William P. Constantino	August 19, 1911	
	John W. Costello	April 20, 1927	
	Leo Joseph Cournoyer	December 11, 1905	
	William A. Cowing	January 6, 1878	
	Vincent Francis Cronin		
	Walter A. Cuffe	January 29, 1898	
	John G. Curley		
	Sidney Curtiss	September 4, 1917	
	John A. Davis	May 9, 1912	
	George Walter Dean		
	Ernest DeRoy	July 13, 1889	
	Edward DeSaulnier	January 8, 1921	
	Cornelius Desmond	October 4, 1893	
	Theophile Jean DesRoches	June 27, 1902	
	William P. Di Vitto		
	Thomas J. Doherty	August 25, 1919	
	James R. Doncaster	January 28, 1919	
	Edmond J. Donlan	December 19, 1899	
	Allison Rice Dorman	December 1, 1879	
	Charles D. Driscoll	June 18, 1888	
	Henry M. Duggan	October 5, 1896	
	Philip J. Durkin	October 21, 1903	
	John Joseph Dwyer		
	Thomas Edward Enright	August 1, 1881	
	C. Eugene Farnam	December 31, 1916	
	Thomas F. Farrell	October 10, 1897	
	Michael Paul Feeney	March 26, 1907	
	Charles E. Ferguson	January 30, 1894	
	Maurice Edward Fitzgerald		
	Peter F. Fitzgerald	February 16, 1889	
	Thomas M. Flaherty	September 6, 1903	
	Stephen L. French	March 9, 1892	
	Francis Thomas Gallagher		
	John L. Gallant		
	Peter B. Gay	July 13, 1915	
	Charles Gibbons	July 21, 1901	
	Frank S. Giles	June 15, 1915	
	Louis Harry Glaser	June 15, 1910	
	William A. Glynn		
	Francis John Good		
	Edwin Daniel Gorman	November 19, 1912	
	Hollis M. Gott	May 25, 1885	
	Joseph Patrick Graham	August 22, 1902	
	Thomas T. Gray	July 22, 1892	
	George Greene	March 7, 1897	
	Frederick Clement Hailer Jr.		
	James Edward Hannon		
	Francis Appleton Harding	1908	
	Fred C. Harrington	April 21, 1902	
	William E. Hays	November 28, 1903	
	Christian A. Herter Jr.	January 29, 1919	
	Albert Fairbanks Higgins		
	James Alan Hodder		
	Isaac Alexander Hodgen	March 28, 1907	
	Olaf Hoff Jr.	January 11, 1892	
	Charles F. Holman	June 21, 1892	
	J. Philip Howard	February 16, 1907	
	Richard Lester Hull	November 30, 1917	
	Walter Forbes Hurlburt	February 18, 1917	
	Nathaniel M. Hurwitz	March 24, 1893	
	Fred A. Hutchinson	April 5, 1881	
	Christopher A. Iannella	May 29, 1913	
	Charles Iannello	April 25, 1906	
	Herbert L. Jackson		
	William Whittem Jenness	April 3, 1904	
	Adolph Johnson	July 20, 1885	
	Ernest A. Johnson	March 13, 1897	
	Stanley Everett Johnson	October 4, 1911	
	Allan Francis Jones	June 29, 1921	
	Francis Xavier Joyce		
	Abraham Herbert Kahalas		
	Charles Kaplan	September 26, 1895	
	Henry E. Keenan		
	William Francis Keenan	January 8, 1921	
	Alfred B. Keith	November 26, 1893	
	Charles T. Kelleher	July 26, 1912	
	Edward L. Kerr	March 6, 1909	
	Thomas E. Key		
	Cornelius F. Kiernan	August 15, 1917	
	Philip Kimball	June 6, 1918	
	William Walter Kirlin	May 13, 1897	
	Thomas Edward Kitchen	December 16, 1924	
	Bernard M. Lally		
	Edmund Vincent Lane	August 31, 1893	
	Joseph F. Leahy		
	Carter Lee	July 3, 1907	
	Francis W. Lindstrom	December 18, 1898	
	Gerald P. Lombard	January 4, 1916	
	William Longworth	August 17, 1914	
	Raymond Joseph Lord		
	C. Gerald Lucey	September 8, 1913	
	John Pierce Lynch	April 19, 1924	
	Arthur Ulton Mahan	June 18, 1900	
	Charles Sumner Marston 3d	June 16, 1921	
	Michael J. McCarthy (politician)	October 23, 1890	
	Frank D. McCarthy		
	Paul Andrew McCarthy	December 23, 1902	
	Joseph F. McEvoy Jr.	April 27, 1918	
	Timothy J. McInerney		10th Suffolk
	Francis H. McNamara		
	Augustus Gardner Means	June 8, 1925	
	Joseph A. Milano	April 8, 1883	
	Sherman Miles	December 5, 1882	
	Arthur William Milne	March 28, 1908	
	Wilfred S. Mirsky	September 14, 1906	
	William Dix Morton Jr.	November 5, 1904	
	Charles A. Mullaly Jr.	September 28, 1910	
	Robert F. Murphy (politician)	January 24, 1899	
	John E. Murphy	February 13, 1900	
	Cornelius Joseph Murray	August 19, 1890	
	Harold Clinton Nagle	July 27, 1917	
	Louis K. Nathanson		
	James Anthony O'Brien	October 27, 1886	
	William Thomas O'Brien	December 2, 1889	
	David J. O'Connor	November 9, 1924	10th Suffolk
	John Henry O'Connor Jr.	December 9, 1917	
	James O'Dea Jr.	August 25, 1922	
	Tip O'Neill	December 9, 1912	
	John J. O'Rourke	June 26, 1916	
	Frank B. Oliveira		
	Harold A. Palmer	October 15, 1906	
	Raymond P. Palmer	December 27, 1895	
	Anthony Parenzo		
	Eben Parsons		
	Charles Louis Patrone	March 17, 1914	
	Antone Perreira		
	Michael P. Pessolano		
	Gabriel Piemonte	January 28, 1909	
	Patrick Francis Plunkett	March 21, 1917	
	George William Porter	November 6, 1885	
	Harvey Armand Pothier	September 6, 1901	
	Meyer Pressman	February 11, 1907	
	Harold Putnam	February 15, 1916	
	Philip Andrew Quinn	February 21, 1910	
	William I. Randall	September 13, 1915	
	George E. Rawson	December 6, 1886	
	Thomas Francis Reilly	August 12, 1903	
	Hibbard Richter	April 12, 1899	
	Joseph N. Roach	March 22, 1883	
	Albert E. Roberts	November 22, 1875	
	William H. J. Rowan	June 21, 1879	
	Richard August Ruether	August 28, 1896	
	Howard S. Russell	July 28, 1887	
	Kendall Ainsworth Sanderson		
	Joseph Douglas Saulnier	April 14, 1906	
	Anthony M. Scibelli	October 16, 1911	
	Edwin Andrews Seibel		
	John M. Shea	December 8, 1902	
	Arthur Joseph Sheehan	March 16, 1897	
	Michael F. Skerry	January 3, 1909	
	Charles J. Skladzien		
	Fletcher Smith Jr.	May 20, 1918	
	Roy C. Smith	January 28, 1890	
	H. Edward Snow	April 25, 1914	
	Thomas H. Spurr Jr.		
	Walter J. Sullivan	March 2, 1923	
	Jeremiah Joseph Sullivan	March 9, 1905	
	William F. Sullivan	August 26, 1905	
	Joseph A. Sylvia Jr.	September 16, 1903	
	Walter Frank Szetela		
	Frank Daniel Tanner	February 3, 1888	
	Clarence F. Telford		
	Irene Thresher	July 6, 1900	
	Robert Xavier Tivnan	June 9, 1924	
	John Joseph Toomey	March 25, 1909	
	Philip Anthony Tracy		10th Suffolk
	Earle Stanley Tyler	December 18, 1896	
	John Taylor Tynan	June 7, 1920	
	Mario Umana	May 5, 1914	
	Theodore Jack Vaitses	May 8, 1901	
	William X. Wall	July 1, 1904	
	Joseph Francis Walsh	February 9, 1907	
	Joseph D. Ward	March 26, 1914	
	Martha Ware	October 6, 1917	
	Malcolm Stuart White		
	Richard James White Jr.	April 14, 1890	
	Howard J. Whitmore Jr.	May 9, 1905	
	Philip F. Whitmore	September 10, 1892	
	David B. Williams (politician)	January 7, 1919	
	Stanislaus George Wondolowski	August 20, 1909	
	Albert E. Wood		
	Alton Hamilton Worrall	April 20, 1893	
	Arthur Eaton Young		

== See also ==
- 1952 Massachusetts gubernatorial election
- 82nd United States Congress
- List of Massachusetts General Courts
