= 1955–1956 Massachusetts legislature =

159th Massachusetts General Court
←	158th	160th	→

Overview
- Legislative body: General Court
- Term: January 5, 1955 – October 6, 1956

Senate
- Members: 40
- President: Richard I. Furbush
- Party control: Republican

House
- Members: 240
- Speaker: Michael F. Skerry
- Party control: Democrat

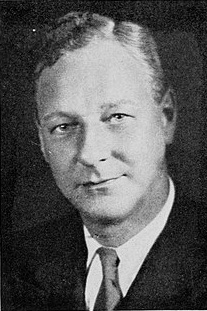
Richard Furbush, Senate president.

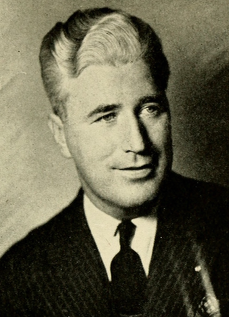
Michael Skerry, House speaker.

Leaders of the Massachusetts General Court, 1955-1956.

The 159th Massachusetts General Court, consisting of the Massachusetts Senate and the Massachusetts House of Representatives, met in 1955 and 1956 during the governorship of Christian Herter. Richard I. Furbush served as president of the Senate and Michael F. Skerry served as speaker of the House.

The Massachusetts Legislative Research Bureau began operating in 1955.

== Senators ==
portrait	name	date of birth	district
	John Adams	May 30, 1915	4th Essex
	John Joseph Beades	June 8, 1916	
	Paul H. Benoit	January 5, 1916	
	Philip Griggs Bowker	April 17, 1899	
	Ralph Vester Clampit	March 28, 1896	
	Silvio O. Conte	November 9, 1921	
	James J. Corbett	November 27, 1896	
	Leslie Bradley Cutler	March 24, 1890	
	Edmund Dinis	October 4, 1924	
	Maurice A. Donahue	September 12, 1918	
	George Jelly Evans	February 4, 1909	
	William Daniel Fleming	April 14, 1907	
	Mary L. Fonseca	March 30, 1915	
	Richard I. Furbush	January 4, 1904	
	Joseph Francis Gibney	January 9, 1911	
	C. Henry Glovsky	March 26, 1918	
	Philip A. Graham	May 21, 1910	
	Charles W. Hedges	March 27, 1901	
	James W. Hennigan Jr.	March 27, 1927	
	Charles V. Hogan	April 12, 1897	
	Newland H. Holmes	August 30, 1891	
	Charles John Innes	June 1, 1901	
	Hastings Keith	November 22, 1915	
	Fred I. Lamson	December 11, 1910	
	Richard Henry Lee	December 20, 1901	
	Ralph Lerche	August 19, 1899	
	Harold R. Lundgren	May 22, 1894	
	Ralph Collins Mahar	January 4, 1912	
	Francis X. McCann	September 2, 1912	
	Frederick T. McDermott	November 20, 1906	
	Charles William Olson	August 24, 1889	
	John Francis Parker	May 29, 1907	
	John E. Powers	November 10, 1910	
	Albert S. Previte Jr.	September 26, 1928	
	Andrew P. Quigley	January 13, 1926	
	Daniel Rudsten		
	Elizabeth Stanton	May 27, 1909	
	Edward C. Stone	June 29, 1878	
	Mario Umana	May 5, 1914	
	Patrick John F. Walsh Jr.	July 2, 1915	

== Representatives ==
portrait	name	date of birth	district
	Frank Haskell Allen	October 12, 1877	7th Worcester
	Leonard H. Amoroso	February 14, 1897	
	Charles H. Anthony	July 6, 1893	
	Ernest W. April	January 15, 1915	
	John A. Armstrong	June 12, 1901	
	Charles J. Artesani		
	John George Asiaf	June 30, 1900	
	John Robert Ayers	February 18, 1911	
	Clifton H. Baker	November 28, 1878	
	Cyrus Barnes	August 23, 1889	
	Fred A. Baumeister	September 24, 1892	
	James C. Bayley	October 28, 1908	
	Raymond H. Beach	August 11, 1888	
	Rene R. Bernardin	July 24, 1910	
	Charles A. Bisbee Jr.	June 8, 1918	
	Fred Arthur Blake	January 13, 1895	
	Carlton H. Bliss	August 7, 1900	
	Belden Bly	September 29, 1914	
	Frank Edwin Boot	November 8, 1905	
	Samuel Joseph Boudreau		
	Gordon Dickson Boynton	August 9, 1901	
	Malcolm Blanchard Boynton	November 13, 1894	
	G. Edward Bradley	October 21, 1906	
	Rene A. Brassard	August 5, 1917	
	John Cornelius Bresnahan	November 14, 1919	
	Frank Eben Brown	January 14, 1890	
	John D. Brown	January 30, 1900	
	John Brox	November 16, 1910	
	John Patrick Buckley	1906	
	William Francis Burke	February 12, 1925	
	Pasquale Caggiano	August 31, 1909	
	Oscar Josiah Cahoon	April 29, 1912	
	Gardner E. Campbell	November 22, 1886	
	John J. Campbell	August 26, 1922	
	Harold Wilson Canavan	May 13, 1915	
	Michael Herbert Cantwell	May 2, 1905	
	Richard Caples	December 23, 1921	
	Charles W. Capraro	November 2, 1920	
	Michael Joseph Carroll	June 21, 1891	
	Ralph W. Cartwright Jr.	October 5, 1920	
	John Joseph Cavanaugh	December 16, 1921	
	Harrison Chadwick	February 25, 1903	
	Wendell Phillips Chamberlain	October 28, 1911	
	Amelio Della Chiesa	July 31, 1901	
	Stephen T. Chmura	August 25, 1916	
	Thomas Francis Coady Jr.	May 8, 1905	
	Anthony M. Colonna	May 2, 1916	
	Harry Coltun		
	George Raymand Como	July 3, 1912	
	James Francis Condon	February 4, 1899	
	Joseph T. Conley		
	William Augustine Connell, Jr	November 17, 1922	
	John W. Costello	April 20, 1927	
	Leo Joseph Cournoyer	December 11, 1905	
	William A. Cowing	January 6, 1878	
	Wallace Boyd Crawford	November 19, 1908	
	John Francis Cremens		
	Sidney Curtiss	September 4, 1917	
	John A. Davis	May 9, 1912	
	John Davoren	July 27, 1915	
	James DeNormandie	November 10, 1907	
	Domenic Victor DePari	October 27, 1910	
	Wilfred Adolphus Derosier	March 2, 1908	
	Edward DeSaulnier	January 8, 1921	
	Cornelius Desmond	October 4, 1893	
	Theophile Jean DesRoches	June 27, 1902	
	William P. Di Vitto		
	Thomas J. Doherty	August 25, 1919	
	John F. Dolan	September 7, 1922	
	James R. Doncaster	January 28, 1919	
	Edmond J. Donlan	December 19, 1899	
	Allison Rice Dorman	December 1, 1879	
	Charles Robert Doyle	September 24, 1925	
	John T. Driscoll	October 26, 1925	
	Charles E. Luke Driscoll	October 1, 1909	
	Philip J. Durkin	October 21, 1903	
	John Marshall Eaton Jr.	March 26, 1918	
	Thomas Edward Enright	August 1, 1881	
	Manuel Faria	March 7, 1906	
	C. Eugene Farnam	December 31, 1916	
	Thomas F. Farrell	October 10, 1897	
	Michael Paul Feeney	March 26, 1907	
	Lawrence F. Feloney	September 11, 1921	
	Charles E. Ferguson	January 30, 1894	
	William H. Finnegan	March 29, 1926	
	Thomas M. Flaherty	September 6, 1903	
	Stephen L. French	March 9, 1892	
	Peter B. Gay	July 13, 1915	
	Charles Gibbons	July 21, 1901	
	Donald Linwood Gibbs	August 7, 1904	
	Frank S. Giles	June 15, 1915	
	Louis Harry Glaser	June 15, 1910	
	Edwin Daniel Gorman	November 19, 1912	
	Hollis M. Gott	May 25, 1885	
	Joseph Patrick Graham	August 22, 1902	
	Thomas T. Gray	July 22, 1892	
	George Greene	March 7, 1897	
	Thomas J. Hannon	December 9, 1900	
	Francis Appleton Harding	1908	
	Fred C. Harrington	April 21, 1902	
	William E. Hays	November 28, 1903	
	Arthur Graham Heaney	July 7, 1908	
	Francis J. Hickey, Jr.	March 7, 1928	
	George W. Hill	September 15, 1888	
	Paul L. Hinckley	August 16, 1910	
	Isaac Alexander Hodgen	March 28, 1907	
	Olaf Hoff Jr.	January 11, 1892	
	Herbert B. Hollis	September 10, 1899	
	Charles F. Holman	June 21, 1892	
	J. Philip Howard	February 16, 1907	
	Richard Lester Hull	November 30, 1917	
	Walter Forbes Hurlburt	February 18, 1917	
	Nathaniel M. Hurwitz	March 24, 1893	
	Fred A. Hutchinson	April 5, 1881	
	Christopher A. Iannella	May 29, 1913	
	Charles Iannello	April 25, 1906	
	John Peter Ivascyn	October 19, 1909	
	William Whittem Jenness	April 3, 1904	
	Adolph Johnson	July 20, 1885	
	Ernest A. Johnson	March 13, 1897	
	Stanley Everett Johnson	October 4, 1911	
	Allan Francis Jones	June 29, 1921	
	Abraham Herbert Kahalas		
	Sumner Z. Kaplan	February 3, 1920	
	William Francis Keenan	January 8, 1921	
	Charles T. Kelleher	July 26, 1912	
	James H. Kelly	October 15, 1919	
	Archibald E. Kenefick	November 4, 1896	
	Edward L. Kerr	March 6, 1909	
	Cornelius F. Kiernan	August 15, 1917	
	Philip Kimball	June 6, 1918	
	William James Kingston	October 17, 1909	
	William Walter Kirlin	May 13, 1897	
	Thomas Edward Kitchen	December 16, 1924	
	Freyda Koplow	October 26, 1907	
	Edmund Vincent Lane	August 31, 1893	
	John Joseph Lawless	July 15, 1912	
	James R. Lawton	October 20, 1925	
	Carter Lee	July 3, 1907	
	Francis W. Lindstrom	December 18, 1898	
	Thomas Francis Linehan	November 23, 1905	
	Gerald P. Lombard	January 4, 1916	
	William Longworth	August 17, 1914	
	Arthur Ulton Mahan	June 18, 1900	
	Francis Joseph Marr	October 10, 1927	
	Charles Sumner Marston 3d	June 16, 1921	
	Rico Matera	June 21, 1917	
	Joseph F. McEvoy Jr.	April 27, 1918	
	Hugh J. McLaughlin	September 27, 1915	
	John P. McMorrow	September 19, 1926	
	Wilfred S. Mirsky	September 14, 1906	
	Joe Moakley	April 27, 1927	
	William Dix Morton Jr.	November 5, 1904	
	Charles A. Mullaly Jr.	September 28, 1910	
	John E. Murphy	February 13, 1900	
	Cornelius Joseph Murray	August 19, 1890	
	Harold Clinton Nagle	July 27, 1917	
	Thomas M. Newth	March 15, 1911	
	Leo James Normandin	December 14, 1922	
	William F. Nourse	September 12, 1922	
	James Anthony O'Brien	October 27, 1886	
	Walter Wilson O'Brien	October 14, 1910	
	David J. O'Connor	November 9, 1924	
	Thomas J. O'Connor	July 27, 1925	
	John Henry O'Connor Jr.	December 9, 1917	
	James O'Dea Jr.	August 25, 1922	
	George Henry O'Farrell	November 15, 1910	
	Joseph Michael O'Loughlin	November 26, 1914	
	John J. O'Rourke	June 26, 1916	
	Daniel Matthew O'Sullivan	August 17, 1921	
	Frank B. Oliveira		
	Harold A. Palmer	October 15, 1906	
	Charles Louis Patrone	March 17, 1914	
	Charles W. Patterson	January 30, 1917	
	Patrick Francis Plunkett	March 21, 1917	
	Michael A. Porrazzo	June 2, 1913	
	George William Porter	November 6, 1885	
	Harvey Armand Pothier	September 6, 1901	
	Harold Putnam	February 15, 1916	
	Philip Andrew Quinn	February 21, 1910	
	William I. Randall	September 13, 1915	
	George E. Rawson	December 6, 1886	
	Frank G. Rico	June 2, 1912	
	William H. J. Rowan	June 21, 1879	
	Richard August Ruether	August 28, 1896	
	Roger A. Sala	August 8, 1893	
	Joseph Douglas Saulnier	April 14, 1906	
	Anthony James Scalli	November 11, 1914	
	Anthony M. Scibelli	October 16, 1911	
	John Ralph Sennott Jr.	April 22, 1910	
	John Ellsworth Sheldon	August 17, 1909	
	Joseph Silvano	March 1, 1909	
	Michael John Simonelli	May 9, 1913	
	J. Roger Sisson	August 14, 1921	
	Michael F. Skerry	January 3, 1909	
	Thomas J. Slack	February 10, 1914	
	Fletcher Smith Jr.	May 20, 1918	
	George T. Smith	March 18, 1888	
	Leo Sontag	August 16, 1922	
	Anthony William Spadafora	October 20, 1924	
	George I. Spatcher	February 2, 1902	
	C. Clifford Stone	August 20, 1897	
	Franklin Sturgis Jr.	October 18, 1883	
	William Christopher Sullivan	October 13, 1924	
	Joseph A. Sylvia	August 19, 1892	
	Joseph A. Sylvia Jr.	September 16, 1903	
	Alvin C. Tamkin	June 19, 1924	
	Armand N. Tancrati	May 3, 1914	
	Frank Daniel Tanner	February 3, 1888	
	Duncan Forbes Thayer	February 14, 1900	
	John F. Thompson	May 20, 1920	
	George Hawley Thompson	June 8, 1917	
	Irene Thresher	July 6, 1900	
	Nathaniel Tilden	November 3, 1903	
	Robert Xavier Tivnan	June 9, 1924	
	John Joseph Toomey	March 25, 1909	
	Herbert Tuckerman	May 2, 1921	
	Earle Stanley Tyler	December 18, 1896	
	John Taylor Tynan	June 7, 1920	
	Theodore Jack Vaitses	May 8, 1901	
	William X. Wall	July 1, 1904	
	Joseph Francis Walsh	February 9, 1907	
	Barclay H. Warburton III	February 5, 1922	
	Joseph D. Ward	March 26, 1914	
	Martha Ware	October 6, 1917	
	Chester H. Waterous	November 18, 1905	
	Norman S. Weinberg	1919	
	Philip F. Whitmore	September 10, 1892	
	Charles E. Wilkinson	December 26, 1883	
	Joseph Wisniowski	March 1, 1918	
	Thomas Casmere Wojtkowski	September 18, 1926	
	Stanislaus George Wondolowski	August 20, 1909	
	Alton Hamilton Worrall	April 20, 1893	
	John Yerxa	April 23, 1904	
	Albert H. Zabriskie	December 7, 1917	
	John F. Zamparelli	December 13, 1922	
	Paul G. Zollo	August 26, 1904	

== See also ==
- 84th United States Congress
- List of Massachusetts General Courts
