= Robert F. Murphy (politician) =

American politician (1899-1976)

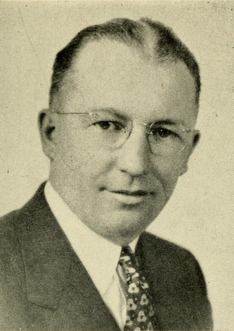
- Murphy c. 1945

59th Lieutenant Governor of Massachusetts
- In office January 3, 1957 – October 6, 1960
- Governor: Foster Furcolo
- Preceded by: Sumner G. Whittier
- Succeeded by: Edward F. McLaughlin, Jr.

Member of the Massachusetts House of Representatives from the 21st Middlesex District
- In office 1943–1955

Majority Leader of the Massachusetts House of Representatives
- In office 1949–1953
- Succeeded by: John F. Thompson

Minority Leader of the Massachusetts House of Representatives
- In office 1953–1955
- Preceded by: Charles Gibbons
- Succeeded by: Charles Gibbons

Chairman of the Metropolitan District Commission
- In office 1960–1964
- Preceded by: John L. Maloney
- Succeeded by: Howard J. Whitmore, Jr.

Personal details
- Born: January 24, 1899 Somerville, Massachusetts, U.S.
- Died: January 9, 1976 (aged 76) Malden, Massachusetts, U.S.
- Party: Democratic
- Education: Malden public schools, Dean Academy, Trinity College
- Profession: Journalist

Robert F. Murphy (January 24, 1899 – January 9, 1976) was an American politician who was a member of the Massachusetts House of Representatives. In 1949 Murphy became the first Democrat to serve as the Majority Leader of the Massachusetts House of Representatives. Murphy also served as the 59th lieutenant governor of Massachusetts from January 1957 to October 6, 1960, when he was appointed by political foe Foster Furcolo to take over the scandal-ridden Metropolitan District Commission. Murphy was the son of Franklin E. Murphy, a telegrapher from Danvers, Massachusetts. Robert's mother, Alice Murphy, worked as a milliner in Boston.

== See also ==
- Massachusetts legislature: 1943–1944, 1945–1946, 1947–1948, 1949–1950, 1951–1952, 1953–1954

== Bibliography ==
- New York Times, Robert F Murphy, Mass Lt Gov, '56–60, dies Jan 9 in Malden (Mass) at 76. Served 6 terms in Mass Legis and in '49 became Dem party's 1st majority leader in House, Page 45, Column 2 (January 11, 1976).
- 1947 1948 Public officers of the Commonwealth of Massachusetts, Boston, MA: Commonwealth of Massachusetts, 1947, p. 243.

Party political offices
Preceded by Paul A. Dever	Democratic nominee for Governor of Massachusetts; 1954	Succeeded by Foster Furcolo
Preceded by James A. Burke	Democratic nominee for Lieutenant Governor of Massachusetts; 1956, 1958	Succeeded by Edward F. McLaughlin Jr.
Political offices
Preceded by Sumner G. Whittier	Lieutenant Governor of Massachusetts; 1957–1961	Succeeded by Edward F. McLaughlin, Jr.
