= Newland H. Holmes =

American politician

Newland Holmes
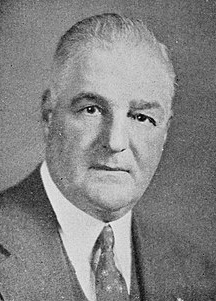
- Newland Holmes, circa 1953

President of the Massachusetts Senate
- In office 1957–1958
- Preceded by: Richard I. Furbush
- Succeeded by: John E. Powers

Personal details
- Born: August 30, 1891 Brockton, Massachusetts
- Died: January 27, 1965 (aged 73) Plymouth, Massachusetts
- Party: Republican
- Profession: Deputy Sheriff

Newland Howard Holmes (August 30, 1891 – January 27, 1965) was a Massachusetts politician who served as President of the Massachusetts Senate from 1957 to 1958. As of 2026, he is the last Republican to hold this position.

== Early life ==
Holmes was born in Brockton, Massachusetts on August 30, 1891. He was a descendant of John Holmes, gentleman of Colchester, Essex, Messenger of the General Court of Plymouth Colony and the executioner of Thomas Granger. He was a cousin of John Haynes Holmes.

== Career ==
Holmes was a member of the Massachusetts House of Representatives from five years before moving to the Senate in 1929. He was the Senate Majority Leader from 1955 to 1956.

In 1956, Richard I. Furbush did not run for re-election and Holmes sought to succeed him as Senate President. At the Republican caucus held before the floor vote, Holmes lost to Senator Philip A. Graham fifteen votes to six. However, Holmes chose not to abide by the caucus decision and ran against Graham and Democratic leader John E. Powers for the Senate Presidency.

On the first ballot, Powers received the vote of all nineteen Democrats while the Republican vote was split between Graham (sixteen votes) and Holmes (five votes). Powers preferred Holmes to Graham and after a lengthy caucus with the Democrats, he was able to convince fifteen Democrats to support Holmes. On the second ballot, Holmes won the Presidency with twenty votes to Graham's sixteen and Powers' four.

Holmes remained President until the Republicans lost their majority following the 1958 election. He remained in the Senate until he was defeated by William Weeks, the son of former United States Secretary of Commerce and United States Senator Sinclair Weeks, in 1964. Holmes' thirty-six year tenure in the Massachusetts Senate is the longest in that body's history.

== Freemasonry ==
Holmes became a Master Mason at Orphan's Hope Lodge in East Weymouth on May 11, 1916. He became a 33° Scottish Rite mason in 1920 serving as the Thrice Potent Master of the Boston Lafayette Lodge of Perfection from 1938 to 1942.

== See also ==
- Massachusetts legislature: 1925–1926, 1927–1928, 1929–1930, 1931–1932, 1935–1936, 1937–1938, 1939, 1941–1942, 1943–1944, 1947–1948, 1949–1950, 1951–1952, 1953–1954, 1955–1956, 1957–1958
- Massachusetts Senate's Norfolk and Plymouth district
