= Howard S. Russell =

American politician

Howard Symmes Russell (1887–1980) was an American author, gardener, and politician.

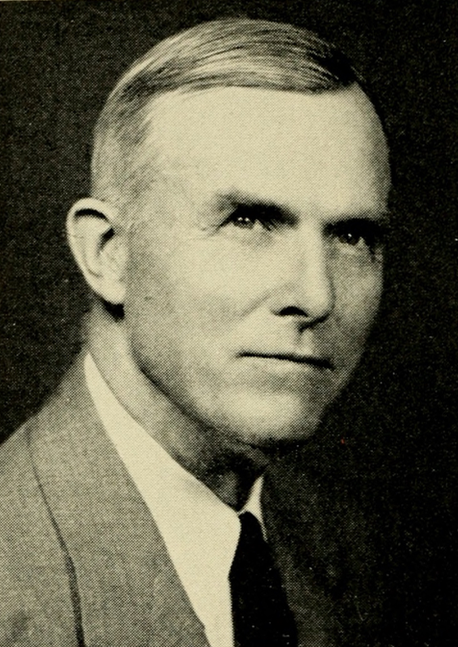
Russell in 1953

Howard Symmes Russell was born on July 28, 1887, to Ira Locke Russell and Louisa Symmes Locke. After graduating from Arlington High School, Russell ended his pursuit of higher education to manage the family market garden upon his father retirement. Russell married Mabel Coolidge in 1913, and moved to Wayland after selling his land in Arlington. Russell became a farm fire insurance broker and actively engaged in public service. He served as a trustee of the Massachusetts Agricultural College, and held the position of Wayland town moderator from 1939 to 1959, and several terms in the Massachusetts House of Representatives from 1949 to 1954. He represented the 10th Middlesex district as a Republican.

Russell wrote A Long, Deep Furrow in 1976, followed by the posthumous publication of Indian New England before the Mayflower in 1980. He died on April 8, 1980. His wife Mabel Russell died on August 30, 1983.

== See also ==
- 1949–1950 Massachusetts legislature
- 1951–1952 Massachusetts legislature
- 1953–1954 Massachusetts legislature
