= Martha Ware =

American politician

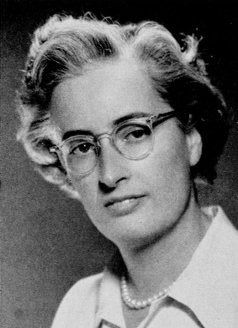
- Martha Ware, circa 1953

Member of the Massachusetts House of Representatives
- In office January 1951 – 1956

Judge of the Massachusetts District Court
- In office 1956–1979

Personal details
- Born: October 6, 1917 Weymouth, Massachusetts, U.S.
- Died: August 4, 2009 (aged 91)
- Education: Boston University

Martha Ware (October 6, 1917 – August 4, 2009) was an American district court judge in Plymouth County, Massachusetts.

== Early life ==
Judge Ware was born in Weymouth, Massachusetts and raised in Abington. An only child, she graduated from Abington High School in 1935 and attended Colby–Sawyer College, where she graduated in 1937 with an associate's degree in secretarial science.

In 1941 she went on to study at Boston University and Portia Law School (now the New England School of Law), where she graduated with an LL.B cum laude in 1941.

== Career ==
After passing the state bar in 1942, Ware became the first female selectman in Abington, the first in Plymouth County.

In 1950 she was elected to the Massachusetts House of Representatives and served three terms in the Massachusetts General Court until 1956. During her campaign for the Legislature in 1950 she was stricken with polio and was bedridden for three months but she won the seat by 13 votes after a recount. Sitting in a wheelchair, she was sworn into office in January 1951.

In 1956 Ware, then 38, was appointed by Governor Christian Herter as the first female judge in Plymouth County, serving primarily in the state's juvenile courts until her retirement in 1979.

== Affiliations ==
Martha Ware was named a trustee for Colby–Sawyer College, Stonehill College, the New England College of Law, and the Whitman Mutual Federal Savings Bank (now known as Mutual Bank). Ware received honorary doctorate degrees from Stonehill in 1979, the New England College of Law in 1988, and Colby–Sawyer in 1994. She was president of Plymouth County's Society for the Prevention of Cruelty to Children and later served as chairman of two area March of Dimes chapters.

== Legacy ==
In 1983 she founded the Samuel L. and May Davis Ware Memorial Scholarship fund, named after her parents, to assist students in receiving a college education. On September 4, 1990, Colby–Sawyer College dedicated its Library-Commons building and Fernald Library as the Ware Campus Center, in honor of Judge Ware and her parents.

== See also ==
- 1951–1952 Massachusetts legislature
- 1953–1954 Massachusetts legislature
- 1955–1956 Massachusetts legislature
