= John W. Costello =

American attorney and politician (1927–2020)

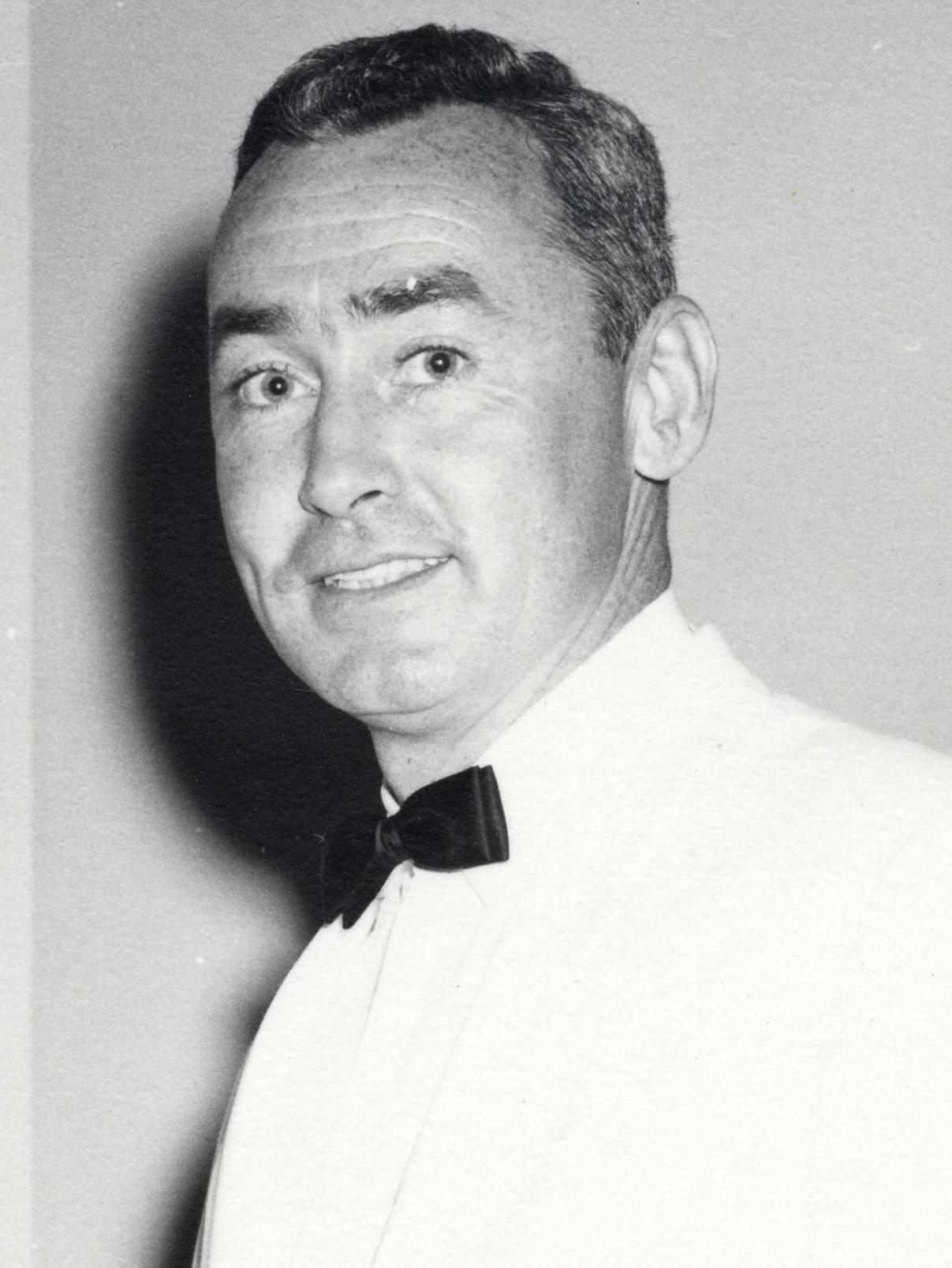
- Costello in the 1960s

Member of the Massachusetts Governor's Council from the 3rd District
- In office 1961–1965
- Preceded by: Edward J. Cronin
- Succeeded by: George F. Cronin, Jr.

Member of the Massachusetts House of Representatives from the 18th Suffolk district
- In office 1951–1961
- Preceded by: James J. Craven, Jr.
- Succeeded by: Stephen Davenport

Personal details
- Born: April 20, 1927 Boston, Massachusetts, U.S.
- Died: September 11, 2020 (aged 93) Weston, Massachusetts, U.S.
- Resting place: Linwood Cemetery; Weston, Massachusetts
- Party: Democratic Party
- Education: College of the Holy Cross (BA); Suffolk University (LLB)
- Occupation: Lawyer

John W. Costello was an American attorney and politician who served as a member of the Massachusetts House of Representatives, the Massachusetts Governor's Council, and was the Democratic nominee for Lieutenant Governor of Massachusetts in 1964.

== Early life ==
Costello was born on April 30, 1927, in Boston. He graduated from Cathedral High School and went on to attend the College of the Holy Cross, where he majored in political science, played end for the Holy Cross Crusaders football team, and was a member of the school's swim team.

== Political career ==
=== Massachusetts House of Representatives ===
In 1950, while a senior at Holy Cross, Costello ran for one of the 18th Suffolk district seats in the Massachusetts House of Representatives. The 18th Suffolk district consisted of Costello's home neighborhood of Jamaica Plain, as well as Forest Hills and Roslindale. During the final month of the primary race, he practiced football in the afternoon and campaigned at night. He finished second out of sixteen candidates in the Democratic primary, which secured him a spot on the general election ballot and, due to the 18th Suffolk being a strong Democratic district, was tantamount to election. During his first year in the legislature, Costello attended class during the day, worked at the state house during the afternoon, and studied at night. Costello remained in the House for ten years and for a time was a member of the House Ways and Means Committee. While a member of the House, Costello earned a law degree from the Suffolk University Law School.

=== Massachusetts Governor's Council ===
In 1961, he was selected by the Massachusetts General Court to fill a vacancy on the Massachusetts Governor's Council caused by Edward J. Cronin's appointment as clerk of the Newton District Court. He was chosen over fellow representative Anthony Colonna 25 votes to 5 in the Senate and 125 to 99 in the House. Costello was elected to the Council in his own right in 1962 and reelected in 1964.

=== Campaigns for lieutenant governor ===
On May 18, 1964, Costello announced his candidacy for lieutenant governor. He was one of fourteen candidates going into the Democratic convention and won the party's endorsement on the fifth ballot by defeating Worcester attorney and Industrial Accident Board member Joseph E. McGuire 724 votes to 691 after five rounds of balloting. None of Costello's convention opponents chose to run in the primary, and he won the nomination unopposed. In the general election, Costello was defeated by Republican Elliot Richardson 50% to 49%.

In 1966, Costello was again a candidate for lieutenant governor. However, this time the convention endorsement was won by McGuire, who defeated Costello, John J. McGlynn, and John F. Dever Jr. after only two rounds balloting. Costello chose to drop out of the race after the convention.

=== Attempted comeback ===
In 1998, Costello ran for his old seat on the Governor's Council. He finished fifth in an eight-candidate Democratic primary.

== Death ==
Costello died on September 11, 2020, at his home in Weston, Massachusetts. His wife, Orry Ann (Kelly) Costello, predeceased him by hours.

== See also ==
- 1951–1952 Massachusetts legislature
- 1953–1954 Massachusetts legislature
- 1955–1956 Massachusetts legislature

Party political offices
Preceded by Francis Bellotti	Democratic nominee for Lieutenant Governor of Massachusetts; 1964	Succeeded by Joseph E. McGuire
