= Richard Caples =

American politician (1921–2002)

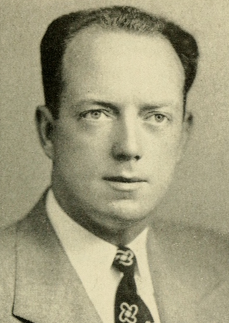

Massachusetts Commissioner of Public Safety
- In office December 22, 1964 – September 28, 1965
- Preceded by: Robert W. MacDonald
- Succeeded by: Leo L. Laughlin

Member of the Massachusetts Senate from the 3rd Suffolk District
- In office 1959–1963
- Preceded by: John Yerxa
- Succeeded by: Oliver F. Ames

Member of the Massachusetts House of Representatives from the 20th Suffolk District
- In office 1951–1959

Personal details
- Born: December 23, 1921 Boston
- Died: April 28, 2002 (aged 80) Lebanon, New Hampshire
- Party: Democratic
- Education: Princeton University; Boston University School of Law

Richard Robert Caples (December 23, 1921 – April 28, 2002) was an American politician who served as Massachusetts public safety commissioner.

== Early life ==
Caples was born on December 23, 1921, in Boston. He attended the Brighton High School, Princeton University, and the Boston University School of Law. He served in the United States Navy during World War II and was a member of the Naval Reserve for 27 years.

== Political career ==
Caples was a member of the Massachusetts House of Representatives from 1951 to 1959 and the Massachusetts Senate from 1959 to 1963. He then served as a legislative aide to Massachusetts Governor Endicott Peabody.

== Public safety Commissioner ==
Peabody lost his reelection bid in 1964 and spent his final days appointing aides to government positions. Peabody had until December 31 to legally make an appointment that could not be recalled by his successor, but due to Christmas break, this deadline was pushed to midnight on December 23. Men who held Caples position were usually appointed to judgeships, however there were no vacancies available. On December 22, it was announced that public safety commissioner Robert W. MacDonald had resigned and Caples would succeed him. Caples and his family arrived at the Governor's office for his swearing in, however, MacDonald showed up and announced that he never intended to resign. MacDonald's wife, however, convinced her husband to return to his law practice and at 11:35 pm on December 22, Caples was sworn in.

Caples appointment was to fill the unexpired term of Frank S. Giles, who had been suspended since his indictment on charges of conspiracy, larceny, aiding and abetting in making false reports, and conflict of interest. However, Giles resigned on September 27, 1965, and Governor John A. Volpe appointed Leo L. Laughlin to succeed him. Caples claimed that he could not legally be replaced until the expiration of Giles' term on July 20, 1966, and refused to give up his office. Laughlin instead took a temporary office in the agency's headquarters while Caples pursued legal action. On September 30, 1965, Suffolk County Superior Court Judge Harry T. Kalus refused to issue an injunction to prevent the Secretary of the Commonwealth from issuing Laughlin's commission and Laughlin moved into the commissioner's office. Kalus later ruled that Laughlin was "the legally and duly qualified Commissioner of Public Safety". His decision was affirmed by the Massachusetts Supreme Judicial Court.

== Later career ==
Caples practiced law in Boston for many years and during the 1970s also served as an assistant attorney general under Robert H. Quinn. He later retired to Wolfeboro, New Hampshire, where he worked as a real estate broker.

Caples died on April 28, 2002, in Lebanon, New Hampshire.

== See also ==
- 1951–1952 Massachusetts legislature
- 1953–1954 Massachusetts legislature
- 1955–1956 Massachusetts legislature
