= James R. Lawton =

American politician and jurist (1925-2007)

James R. Lawton Hon.
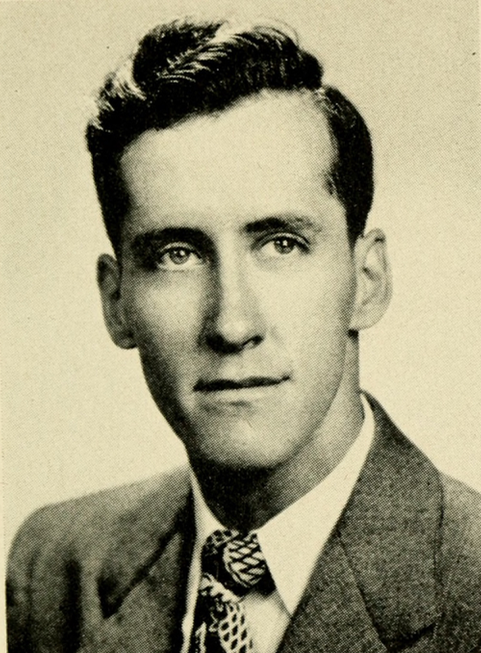
- Portrait of James R. Lawton

Massachusetts Registrar of Motor Vehicles
- In office 1963–1964
- Preceded by: Clement A. Riley
- Succeeded by: Richard E. McLaughlin

Member of the Massachusetts House of Representatives for the 8th Plymouth District
- In office 1953–1963
- Preceded by: C. Gerald Lucey
- Succeeded by: James P. Downey

Personal details
- Born: October 20, 1925 Brockton, Massachusetts
- Died: February 3, 2007 (aged 81) Brockton, Massachusetts
- Party: Democratic
- Education: Suffolk University; Portia Law School
- Profession: Attorney; Government official Judge

James R. Lawton (October 20, 1925 – February 3, 2007) was an American jurist and politician who served as a probate judge in Plymouth County, Massachusetts, member of the Massachusetts House of Representatives, and a Brockton city councilor.

== Early life ==
Lawton was born on October 20, 1925, in Brockton to Irish immigrant parents. In 1931, Lawton's father was killed by a hit-and-run driver who was never apprehended. During his youth, Lawton did impersonations of public figures, including Adolf Hitler, Winston Churchill, Franklin D. Roosevelt, and Eleanor Roosevelt, for money.

He attended Brockton High School until his junior year, when he left to enlist in the United States Army. He served in the 513th Parachute Infantry Regiment. On March 24, 1945, he participated in Operation Varsity, the final Allied airborne invasion of Europe. Six days later he was seriously wounded in action in Munster. He spent the next eighteen months in Army hospitals and was discharged in November 1946. He then returned to Brockton High School and graduated. He went on to earn degrees from Suffolk University and Portia Law School (later known as New England School of Law).

== Political career ==
In 1947, Lawton was elected to the Brockton City Council. At the age of 22 he was the youngest councilor ever elected in the history of Brockton. In 1950, Lawton was an unsuccessful candidate for a seat in the Massachusetts House of Representatives. He ran again two years later and this time was successful. At the time, he was one of the few Democrats from Plymouth County to serve on Beacon Hill. During his tenure in the House, Lawton served on the Ways & Means Committee, chaired the Committee on Bills in Third Reading, and served as House Chairman on the Commission to Redistrict Legislative, Council & Congressional seats.

In 1960, Lawton was a last-minute candidate for Lieutenant Governor of Massachusetts. He showed surprising strength on the first ballot at the Democratic convention, but did not win the party's endorsement. After the convention, Lawton decided that he would run for Attorney General of Massachusetts in 1962 if there was a vacancy. He won the endorsement of the Massachusetts Democratic Party at the party convention, but lost the nomination to Francis E. Kelly in the primary election.

In 1963, Lawton became legislative secretary to governor Endicott Peabody. That May, Peabody appointed Lawton to the position of Registrar of Motor Vehicles. During his tenure as Registrar, Lawton supported mandatory use of seat belts, licensing for auto mechanics, compulsory vehicle inspections, and retraining for drivers with frequent violations. He also took a stand against public officials who sought to have their constituents' traffic tickets "fixed".

== Legal career ==
In October 1964, Peabody appointed Lawton to the Plymouth County Probate Court. In February 1995, Lawton presided over a child custody case involving 10-year-old identical twin girls. After consulting with both children, he found that one of the girls strongly desired to live with their mother while the other expressed a very strong desire to live with their father. Lawton decided to accommodate the children and ruled that one girl should live with their mother and the other should live with their father. The decision gained national attention and lingered in court until 1998, when a different judge placed both twins with their mother. Lawton remained a judge until October 20, 1995, when he reached the mandatory retirement age of seventy.

From 1969 until his death, Lawton was Chairman of the Board of Trustees of his alma mater, the New England School of Law. During his tenure, the school moved from Beacon Hill to Newbury Street and then from Newbury Street to the Boston Theater District.

== Personal life and death ==
On October 16, 1948, Lawton married Jeanne Cashman in Brockton. They had five sons, one of whom, Mark Lawton, also served in the Massachusetts House of Representatives and as a state court judge.

On February 3, 2007, Lawton fell and broke his hip at his Brockton home. He never recovered and died in Brockton Hospital on March 20.

== See also ==
- 1953–1954 Massachusetts legislature
- 1955–1956 Massachusetts legislature
