= John Yerxa =

American politician

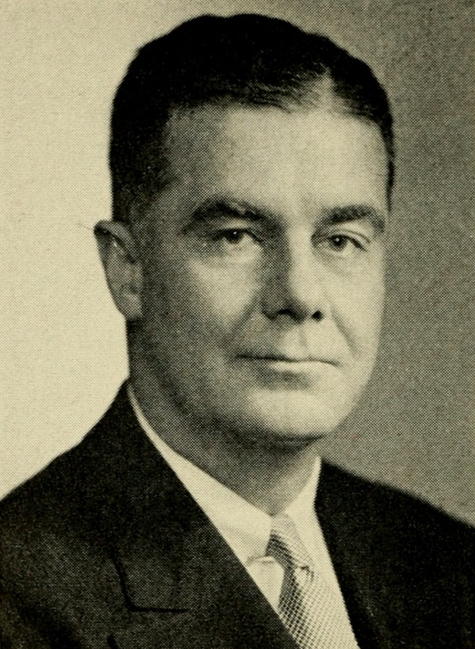
- Yerxa c. 1953

Member of the Massachusetts Senate from the 3rd Suffolk District
- In office 1957–1959
- Preceded by: Charles John Innes
- Succeeded by: Richard Caples

Member of the Massachusetts House of Representatives from the 5th Suffolk District
- In office 1953–1957
- Preceded by: Sherman Miles
- Succeeded by: William F. Otis

Member of the Boston City Council from Ward 14
- In office 1948–1952
- Preceded by: James C. Bayley Jr.
- Succeeded by: Seat eliminated

Personal details
- Born: April 23, 1904 Boston, Massachusetts, U.S.
- Died: June 22, 1967 (aged 63)
- Party: Republican
- Education: Harvard College

John Eliot Yerxa (April 23, 1904 – June 22, 1967) was an American politician who served on the Boston City Council, the Massachusetts House of Representatives, and the Massachusetts Senate.

== Early life ==
Yerxa was born on April 23, 1904, in Boston. He attended the Noble and Greenough School and the Berkshire School. He graduated from Harvard College in 1926. He planned on a career in civil engineering and his first job out of college was as a draftsman for the Moffat Tunnel Commission in Denver. He returned to Boston after a few months due to a family illness and spent some time studying at Harvard Law School.

== Business career ==
In 1928, Yerxa entered the brokerage business. He was associated with the firm of Townsend, Anthony, & Tyson. He became a member of the Boston Stock Exchange in 1936 and in 1937 joined its board of governors and public relations committee. In 1939 he was elected president of the exchange. At the age of 35, he was the youngest leader in the exchange's history. He retired from the Boston Stock Exchange in May 1942 to join the United States Army Air Corps. He served with the Air Transport Command at Presque Isle Air Force Base and left the service with the rank of lieutenant colonel. After the war, he spent six years as New England regional manager of Pan American World Airways. He then served as vice president of Allied Research & Service Corp.

== Personal life ==
In 1927, Yerxa married Constance Gilpin. She died in 1950. He later married Marjorie Speare, daughter of Frank Palmer Speare. He had one daughter by his first wife and one son and one daughter by his second wife. In 1957 he moved from Boston to Dedham, Massachusetts.

== Political career ==
Yerxa's grandfather, who served on the Cambridge board of selectmen, first interested him in politics. From 1948 to 1951 he was a member of the Boston City Council. From 1953 to 1957 he was a member of the Massachusetts House of Representatives. He then served one term representing the 3rd Suffolk District in the Massachusetts Senate. In 1958, Yerxa was the Republican nominee for state treasurer. He lost to Democratic incumbent John Francis Kennedy 62% to 37%. Yerxa died on June 22, 1967.

== See also ==
- 1953–1954 Massachusetts legislature
- 1955–1956 Massachusetts legislature

Party political offices
Preceded by Robert H. Beaudreau	Republican nominee for Treasurer and Receiver-General of Massachusetts; 1958	Succeeded by Walter J. Trybulski
