= Philip Kimball =

American lawyer and politician

Philip K. Kimball (June 6, 1918 – September 5, 2005) was an American lawyer and politician.

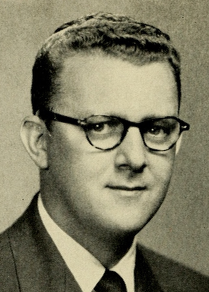

Born in Springfield, Massachusetts, Kimball graduated from Classical High School. He served in the United States Army during World War II. Kimball received his law degree from Northeastern University School of Law and practiced law in Springfield. Kimball served in the Massachusetts House of Representatives from 1949 to 1969 and was a Republican. Kimball died at Hartford Hospital in Hartford, Connecticut. He was Jewish.

== See also ==
- Massachusetts legislature: 1949–1950, 1951–1952, 1953–1954, 1955–1956
