= Edward DeSaulnier =

American politician and jurist

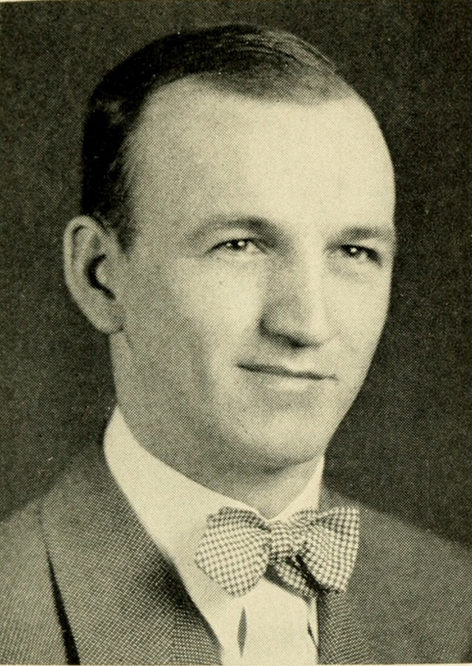

Judge of the Massachusetts Superior Court
- In office 1958–1972

Member of the Massachusetts Senate
- In office 1957–1958

Member of the Massachusetts House of Representatives
- In office 1949–1957

Personal details
- Born: Edward Joseph DeSaulnier Jr; January 8, 1921 Chelmsford, Massachusetts, U.S.
- Died: April 20, 1989 (aged 68) Juno Beach, Florida, U.S.
- Children: 5, including Mark
- Education: College of the Holy Cross (BA); Boston University (LLB)

Edward Joseph DeSaulnier Jr. (January 8, 1921 – April 20, 1989) was an American politician and judge from the commonwealth of Massachusetts. He served in the Massachusetts House of Representatives from 1949 to 1957, in the Massachusetts Senate from 1957 to 1958, and on the Massachusetts Superior Court from 1958 to 1972. His son, Mark DeSaulnier, is a member of the United States House of Representatives from California.

== Early life ==
DeSaulnier was from Chelmsford, Massachusetts, the son of a French Canadian immigrant. He attended the College of the Holy Cross, then during World War II, served as a combat pilot in the United States Marine Corps; he served during the Battle of Iwo Jima. After the war, he graduated from the Boston University School of Law.

== Career ==
DeSaulnier served in the Massachusetts House of Representatives from 1949 to 1957, then served one term in the Massachusetts Senate. Governor Foster Furcolo appointed DeSaulnier to the Massachusetts Superior Court in December 1958.

In 1971, DeSaulnier was accused of accepting bribes from a criminal defendant. Although the statute of limitations meant he could not be charged, he was disbarred by the Massachusetts Supreme Judicial Court on January 11, 1972, and resigned his judgeship.

After his disbarment, DeSaulnier worked for a company that sold bulletproof vests. He developed alcoholism, recovered, and then earned a degree from Rutgers University's School of Alcohol Studies and became deputy director of Broward County, Florida's commission on alcoholism. He petitioned the Massachusetts Board of Bar Overseers to reinstate his law license in 1979, but his request was denied in 1980. In 1981, the New England Patriots hired him to consult on issues around substance abuse.

== Personal life and death ==
DeSaulnier and his wife, Virginia, had five children, including Mark DeSaulnier, a U.S. Congressman from California. They raced horses under the name Claymore Stables. The marriage ended in divorce; he remarried and was divorced a second time after moving to Florida.

DeSaulnier, who also had a gambling problem, died in 1989 in his home in Juno Beach, Florida, by a self-inflicted gunshot. He is buried in Arlington National Cemetery.

== See also ==
- Massachusetts legislature: 1949–1950, 1951–1952, 1953–1954, 1955–1956
- Massachusetts Senate's 1st Middlesex district
