= Howard J. Whitmore Jr. =

American politician (1905-1998)

Mayor of Newton, Massachusetts
- In office January 1, 1954 – December 31, 1959
- Preceded by: Theodore R. Lockwood
- Succeeded by: Donald L. Gibbs

Metropolitan District Commissioner
- In office 1964–1970
- Preceded by: Robert F. Murphy
- Succeeded by: John W. Sears

Member of the Massachusetts House of Representatives
- In office 1947–1953

Personal details
- Born: May 9, 1905 Newton, Massachusetts, U.S.
- Died: June 19, 1998 (aged 93) Boston, Massachusetts, U.S.
- Party: Republican
- Education: Harvard College
- Occupation: Investment counsel

Howard J. Whitmore Jr. (May 9, 1905 – June 19, 1998) was an American politician who was a member of the Massachusetts House of Representatives from 1947 to 1953 and Mayor of Newton, Massachusetts from 1954 to 1959.

== Early years ==
A native of Newton, Massachusetts, Whitmore played baseball for Newton High School. He went on to Harvard College, was a "star right-hander" pitching for the Crimson baseball team, and graduated in 1929. After his freshman year at Harvard in 1926, he played summer baseball for Chatham in the Cape Cod Baseball League.

== Political career ==
Whitmore's political career began in 1940 when he was elected to the Newton Board of Aldermen. From 1947 to 1953, he was a member of the Massachusetts House of Representatives, where he was the Chairman of the House Committee on Ways and Means. He left the House in 1953 after being elected Mayor of Newton.

Whitmore did not seek reelection in 1959. He was considered to be a frontrunner for the Republican nomination for Governor in 1960, but dropped out of the race after he lost the convention vote to John A. Volpe. He was the Republican nominee for United States Senate in 1964. He lost to incumbent Ted Kennedy by over one million votes.

== Later years ==
After his defeat in the 1964 Senate race, Whitmore was named Commissioner of the Metropolitan District Commission, a post he held until 1970. He died in Boston, Massachusetts in 1998 at age 93.

== See also ==
- Massachusetts legislature: 1947–1948, 1949–1950, 1951–1952, 1953–1954

Party political offices
Preceded by George C. Lodge	Republican nominee for U.S. Senator from Massachusetts (Class 1); 1964	Succeeded by Josiah Spaulding
