= James H. Kelly =

American politician (1919–1984)

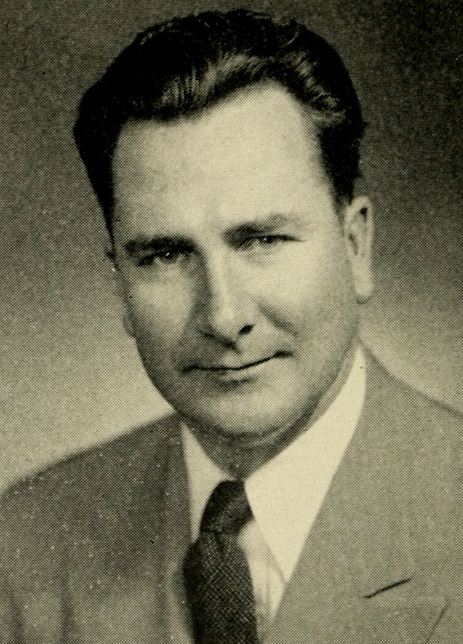
James H. Kelly

James H. Kelly (October 15, 1919 – July 13, 1984) was an American politician who served as Boston Fire Commissioner and a member of the Massachusetts House of Representatives.

== Early life ==
Kelly was born on October 15, 1919, in Boston. He graduated from Mission High School and Northeastern University and worked as an insurance broker.

== Political career ==
Kelly was a member of the Massachusetts House of Representatives from 1953 to 1967. He was an unsuccessful candidate for state auditor in 1966, losing to incumbent Thaddeus M. Buczko 60% to 40% in the Democratic primary. After leaving the legislature, Kelly served as deputy state treasurer under Robert Q. Crane. In November 1968 he was named Boston Fire Commissioner by Mayor Kevin White. He retired on July 11, 1975, while under investigation for allegedly violating state law by pressuring members of the department into contributing to White's 1971 campaign. He would be the last civilian commissioner of the department until 2006. On August 15, 1975, he and deputy chief Leslie Magoon were indicted on charges of conspiracy and violating three of the state's election laws. According to the indictment, the two and others promised to promote BFD personnel in exchange for contributions to White's mayoral campaign. On July 1, 1976, Kelly and Magoon were acquitted of the conspiracy charge.

Kelly died on July 13, 1984, at his home in Hyannis, Massachusetts.

== See also ==
- 1953–1954 Massachusetts legislature
- 1955–1956 Massachusetts legislature

Fire appointments
Preceded by William J. Fitzgerald	Commissioner of the Boston Fire Department; 1968–1975	Succeeded by George Paul
