= C. Eugene Farnam =

American politician (1916-1999)

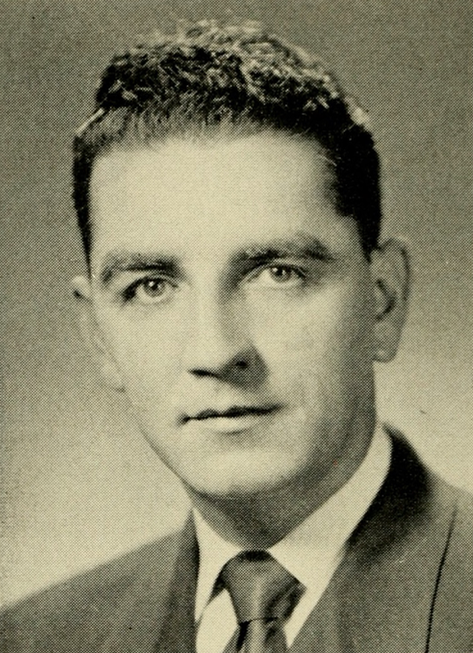
- Portrait of C. Eugene Farnam

Massachusetts Insurance Commissioner
- In office 1962–1971
- Preceded by: Otis M. Whitney
- Succeeded by: John G. Ryan

Member of the Massachusetts Senate for the 6th Middlesex District
- In office 1959–1962
- Preceded by: Frederick T. McDermott
- Succeeded by: Philibert Pellegrini

Member of the Massachusetts House of Representatives for the 26th Middlesex District
- In office 1951–1957
- Preceded by: John J. Fitzpatrick
- Succeeded by: ^{1}

Personal details
- Born: December 31, 1916 Charlestown
- Died: November 8, 1999 (aged 82) Peabody, Massachusetts
- Resting place: Oak Grove Cemetery; Medford, Massachusetts
- Party: Republican
- Education: Northeastern University; University of Miami

Clarence Eugene Farnam (December 31, 1916 – November 8, 1999) was an American politician who served as Massachusetts Insurance Commissioner and as a member of the Massachusetts General Court.

== Early life ==
Farnam was born on December 31, 1916, in the Charlestown neighborhood of Boston. He attended Medford High School, Northeastern University, and the University of Miami.

== Political career ==
Farnam was a member of the Medford Board of Aldermen from 1948 to 1949. He represented the 26th Middlesex District in the Massachusetts House of Representatives from 1951 to 1957 and the 6th Middlesex District in the Massachusetts Senate from 1959 to 1962. From 1962 to 1971 he was the state insurance commissioner.

== Business career ==
While serving in the House of Representatives, Farnam was a group representative for the Hardware Mutual Casualty Co. He was the owner of C. Eugene Farnam Insurance Agency in Medford. After retiring as state insurance commissioner in September 1971, he became a consultant to the insurance industry and the United States Department of Transportation.

== Death ==
Farnam died on November 8, 1999, in Peabody, Massachusetts.

== See also ==
- 1951–1952 Massachusetts legislature
- 1953–1954 Massachusetts legislature
- 1955–1956 Massachusetts legislature

== Notes ==
1. The 26th Middlesex District sent three representatives to the Massachusetts House of Representatives during Farnam's tenure. In 1957, Farnam and John F. Zamparelli were succeeded by Alexander J. Cella and Michael Catino. The third member, Thomas J. Doherty, was reelected.
