= Richard I. Furbush =

American politician

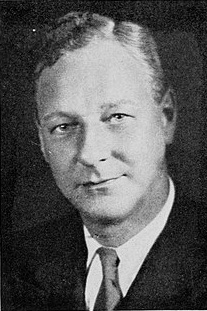
- Richard Furbush, circa 1953

President of the Massachusetts Senate
- In office 1951–1957
- Preceded by: Harris S. Richardson
- Succeeded by: Newland H. Holmes

Member of the Massachusetts Senate from the 5th Middlesex District
- In office 1943–1956
- Preceded by: Louis Benedict Connors
- Succeeded by: William E. Hays

Personal details
- Born: January 4, 1904 Waltham, Massachusetts, U.S.
- Died: July 15, 1990 (aged 86) Waltham, Massachusetts, U.S.
- Party: Republican

Richard I. Furbush (January 4, 1904 – July 15, 1990) was an American politician who served as President of the Massachusetts Senate.

== Early life ==
Furbush was born on January 4, 1904, in Waltham, Massachusetts. He dropped out of high school after his sophomore year to help support his widowed mother (he later earned his high school equivalency from Harvard University extension courses). He first worked at a factory making sweater sleeves. He then worked for the Waltham Watch Company. During the 1950s he was vice president of Adams Engineering Co.

== Political career ==
Furbush began his political career in 1936 by campaigning for Republican gubernatorial candidate John W. Haigis. Furbush ran for delegate to the state Republican convention, but lost to George Drury by 31 votes. Drury urged Furbush to run for Waltham city council. He was elected and the following year ran for a seat in the Massachusetts House of Representatives. He served in the House from 1939 to 1943. He then represented the 5th Middlesex District in the Massachusetts Senate. In 1950 he was the majority floor leader. From 1951 to 1957 he was President of the Senate. In 1956, he ran for Secretary of the Commonwealth. He lost to incumbent Edward J. Cronin 53% to 46%. From 1957 to 1974, Furbush was executive secretary of the Metropolitan District Commission.

Furbush died on July 15, 1990, in Waltham, Massachusetts.

== See also ==
- Massachusetts legislature: 1939, 1941–1942, 1943–1944, 1947–1948, 1949–1950, 1951–1952, 1953–1954, 1955–1956

Party political offices
Preceded by Michael J. McCarthy	Republican nominee for Secretary of the Commonwealth of Massachusetts; 1956	Succeeded by Marion Curran Boch
