= Leo L. Laughlin =

American law enforcement officer and businessman (1910-1997)

Massachusetts Public Safety Commissioner
- In office September 28, 1965 – August 31, 1969
- Preceded by: Richard Caples
- Succeeded by: William Powers

Personal details
- Born: September 10, 1910 Shenandoah, Pennsylvania
- Died: April 13, 1997 (aged 86) Belleair, Florida
- Spouse: Mary E. Galligan
- Education: Catholic University, B.A.; L.L.B
- Profession: Law enforcement officer Business executive Non-profit executive

Leo L. Laughlin (September 10, 1910 – April 13, 1997) was an American law enforcement officer and businessman who worked for the Federal Bureau of Investigation and served as Massachusetts' Commissioner of Public Safety.

== Early life ==
Laughlin was born on September 10, 1910, in Shenandoah, Pennsylvania. He earned a Bachelor of Arts and a Bachelor of Laws degree from The Catholic University of America.

== FBI career ==
Laughlin joined the Federal Bureau of Investigation on December 2, 1935. He was recommended for the job by U.S. Senator Joseph F. Guffey and U.S. Representative James H. Gildea. His first assignment was as a special agent in the Boston field office. In 1937 he transferred to the New York office. On January 9, 1938, he was designated the Number One Man of the Newark office. That May he had an argument with a special agent and this, along with a personality clash with the office's special agent in charge, resulted in a transfer back to New York. When the SAC from Newark transferred to New York in the fall of 1938, Laughlin relocated to the Cincinnati office. In 1940, Laughlin was promoted to supervisor in the investigative division. The following year he moved to the security division, where he worked in the espionage section. In 1944, Laughlin was transferred to the St. Paul field office and promoted to assistant special agent in charge. He was transferred to the Baltimore office in 1945. On June 21, 1945, he was named acting special agent in charge of the office in Providence. He was designated SAC of Providence on July 17, 1945, and remained there until that fall when J. Edgar Hoover loaned him and Joseph Carroll to the War Assets Administration. Laughlin served as the WAA's deputy director of the compliance enforcement division. Although the assignment was to be temporary, he remained with the WAA until 1947, as the head of the administration, Robert McGowan Littlejohn refused to let Laughlin and Carroll return to the FBI until after Hoover got the White House to intervene. On April 1, 1947, Laughlin returned to the FBI as an inspector. From 1947 to 1953 he supervised the FBI's liaison and loyalty sections. In the role, Laughlin was involved in the investigations of Judith Coplon, William Remington, and Harry Dexter White. He then served as special agent in charge of the Washington field office until 1957, when he returned to Boston as special agent in charge.

In March 1962, Massachusetts Governor John A. Volpe announced that Laughlin was his choice to become the next Commissioner of the Boston Police Department. Laughlin was prepared to take a two-year leave of absence from the FBI to run the department. However, the Massachusetts General Court took the power to appoint the Boston Police Commissioner away from the Governor and returned it to the Mayor of Boston. Boston Mayor John F. Collins announced Laughlin as a finalist for the position, but Laughlin took himself out of the running, stating that he was "not interested in becoming commissioner". One of Laughlin's subordinates, Edmund McNamara, was chosen instead.

== Business career ==
In 1962, Laughlin retired from the FBI and became the executive vice president of the Harrington & Richardson Firearms Company. He later became president of the company. Laughlin left H&R in 1963 due to ill health and later ran a management security consulting business in Boston.

== Massachusetts Commissioner of Public Safety ==
On September 29, 1965, suspended Commissioner of Public Safety Frank S. Giles resigned and Governor John A. Volpe appointed Laughlin to replace him. After he was sworn in, Laughlin found that Richard Caples, who served as acting commissioner during Giles' suspension, would not give up his office, as Caples claimed that he could not legally be replaced until the expiration of Giles' term on July 20, 1966. Laughlin instead took a temporary office in the agency's headquarters while Caples pursued legal action. On September 30, 1965, Suffolk County Superior Court Judge Harry T. Kalus refused to issue an injunction to prevent the Secretary of the Commonwealth from issuing Laughlin's commission and Laughlin moved into the commissioner's office. Kalus later ruled that Laughlin was "the legally and duly qualified Commissioner of Public Safety". His decision was affirmed by the Massachusetts Supreme Judicial Court.

Laughlin was appointed to a five-year term in January 1966. In 1967, The Boston Globe reported that Volpe wanted to oust Laughlin due to complaints over the way Laughlin handled the agency. Among the reported issues with Laughlin's leadership were his refusal to accept advice from his staff and low morale among members of the Massachusetts State Police. However, Laughlin refused to quit and Volpe could not remove him, as the accusations were not serious enough to justify bringing charges against him. Laughlin resigned as Commissioner of Public Safety effective August 31, 1969, to become executive director of 100 Club, a charitable organization that provides aid to the widows and children of police officers and firefighters killed in the line of duty.

== Family life ==
Laughlin married Mary E. Galligan they had five children. His first cousin, James M. Quigley, was a United States representative from Pennsylvania and Assistant Secretary of Health, Education, and Welfare. While working in Boston, Laughlin resided in Winchester, Massachusetts, across the street from John A. Volpe.

== Later life and death ==
In 1978, Laughlin retired to Kennebunk, Maine, and Belleair, Florida He died in Belleair, Florida, on April 13, 1997.
