= Frank S. Giles =

American politician (1915-1991)

Massachusetts Public Safety Commissioner
- In office July 20, 1961 – September 28, 1965
- Preceded by: J. Henry Goguen
- Succeeded by: Leo L. Laughlin

Minority Leader of the Massachusetts House of Representatives
- In office 1957–1961
- Preceded by: Charles Gibbons
- Succeeded by: Sidney Curtiss

Member of the Massachusetts House of Representatives 5th Essex District
- In office 1947–1961

Personal details
- Born: June 15, 1915 Methuen, Massachusetts
- Died: March 2, 1991 (aged 75) Burlington, Massachusetts
- Party: Republican
- Education: McIntosh College
- Profession: Theatre and concessions

Frank S. Giles Jr. (born June 15, 1915, in Methuen, Massachusetts – died March 2, 1991, in Burlington, Massachusetts ) was a politician who was a Member of the Massachusetts House of Representatives and the Massachusetts Public Safety Commissioner.

== Business career ==
Giles was a Theatre manager, and the proprietor of the Merrimack Concession Co.

== Government service ==
Giles was a member of the Massachusetts House of Representatives from the 5th Essex District from 1947 to 1961. He was named House Minority Leader in 1957. Giles was also a Methuen town meeting member for 22 years and a member of the Methuen school committee for six years, five as chairman. In 1960, Giles ran for Governor of Massachusetts, he lost the convention nomination to John A. Volpe and did not run in the primary. Giles was appointed Massachusetts Public Safety Commissioner by Volpe on July 20, 1961.

== Indictment and resignation ==
On March 26, 1964, Giles was indicted on charges of conspiracy, larceny, aiding and abetting in making false reports, and conflict of interest. As a result, on March 30, 1964, Giles was suspended from his job as Massachusetts Public Safety Commissioner. Robert McDonald was appointed acting commissioner on April 16, 1964, by Governor Endicott Peabody. On December 23, 1964, Peabody chose Richard Caples to succeed McDonald as Acting Public Safety Commissioner. Giles was found guilty of perjury on February 18, 1965. He resigned as Commissioner on September 27, 1965. His resignation was accepted by the Governor on September 28, 1965. As Giles suspension was terminated by his resignation, Caples temporary appointment also ended, and Leo L. Laughlin was appointed by Governor John A. Volpe to fill the vacancy that was created by Giles' resignation. Giles conviction was set aside on June 22, 1967.

== See also ==
- Massachusetts legislature: 1947–1948, 1949–1950, 1951–1952, 1953–1954, 1955–1956
