= Silvio O. Conte =

American politician (1921–1991)

Silvio Conte
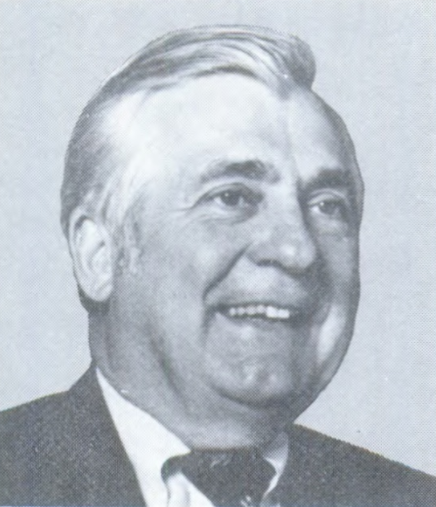
- Conte in 1989

Member of the U.S. House of Representatives from Massachusetts's 1st district
- In office January 3, 1959 – February 8, 1991
- Preceded by: John W. Heselton
- Succeeded by: John Olver

Member of the Massachusetts Senate from the Berkshire district
- In office January 3, 1951 – January 3, 1959
- Preceded by: Michael H. Condron
- Succeeded by: Robert P. Cramer

Personal details
- Born: Silvio Ottavio Conte; November 9, 1921 Pittsfield, Massachusetts, US
- Died: February 8, 1991 (aged 69) Bethesda, Maryland, US
- Party: Republican
- Spouse: Corinne Conte
- Children: 4
- Education: Boston College (LLB)
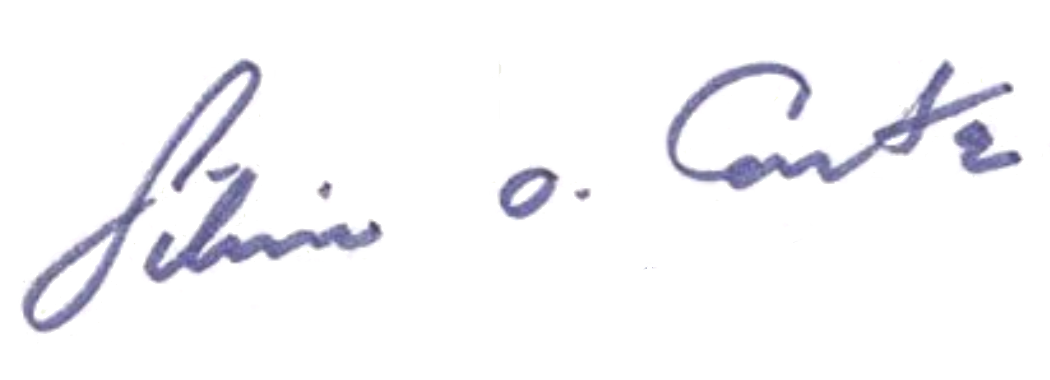
- Signature

Military service
- Allegiance: United States of America
- Branch/service: United States Navy
- Years of service: 1942–1944
- Battles/wars: World War II
- Silvio O. Conte's voice Conte speaks in support of FY1989 interior appropriations Recorded June 29, 1988

Silvio Ottavio Conte (November 9, 1921 – February 8, 1991) was an American lawyer and politician. He was a Republican member of the United States House of Representatives for 16 terms, representing the 1st congressional district of Massachusetts from January 3, 1959, until his death in Bethesda, Maryland, in 1991. He strongly supported legislation to protect the environment, as well as federal funding of medical and scientific research.

== Early life and education ==
Conte was born to parents who were Italian immigrants in Pittsfield, Massachusetts. He attended local public schools, including Pittsfield Vocational High School, graduating in 1940 and later worked as a machinist and pressman. He served as a construction mechanic in the United States Navy SeaBees during World War II from 1942 to 1944.

After the war, Conte went on to college, graduating from Boston College and Boston College Law School under the G. I. Bill of Rights. He was a member of the Boston College Eagles football and basketball teams. He earned his law degree (LL.B.) in 1949 and passed the Massachusetts bar.

He married Corinne Duvall in 1948 and they had four children together.

== Political career ==
Conte returned to Pittsfield and immediately turned his attention to politics. He was elected to the Massachusetts Senate in 1950, serving from 1951 to 1958.

He was elected to the U.S. House of Representatives in 1958, defeating James M. Burns, a professor at Williams College. Conte was appointed to the House Appropriations Committee, a seat that he would keep for all of his long congressional career. He served as the ranking minority member of the committee at the time of his death.

== Congressional career ==
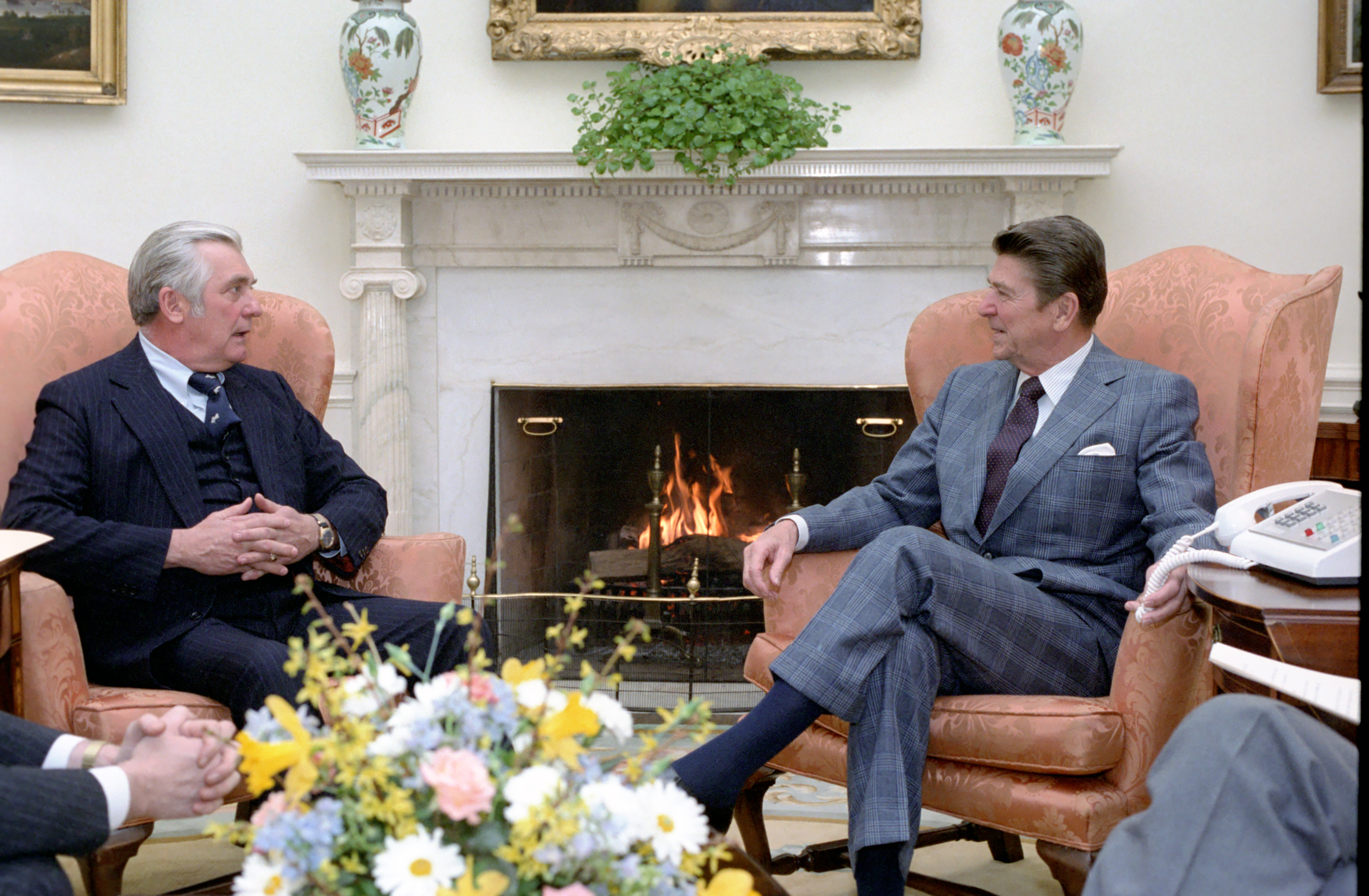
Conte with President Ronald Reagan in 1981

Conte was effective in taking care of his district, which covered most of Western Massachusetts. He helped to win defense contracts for the General Electric plant in Pittsfield. An avid fisherman and environmentalist, he introduced legislation to bring back Atlantic salmon to the Connecticut River and worked to protect other natural resources.

He supported federal funding of research, and secured funding for a polymer research center at the University of Massachusetts Amherst. As he was a passionate advocate for federal funded health research through the National Institutes of Health, the NIH continues to honor him today with grants for neurological research awarded in his name.

Conte never lost an election; he was the only Republican member of Congress who did not have an opponent in the 1964 election. He is somewhat famous for wearing a pig mask in a 1983 press conference, as a protest against pork barrel spending.

Conte voted in favor of the Civil Rights Act of 1960, the Civil Rights Act of 1964 and the Civil Rights Act of 1968, as well as the 24th Amendment to the U.S. Constitution and the Voting Rights Act of 1965, and like fellow Massachusetts Republicans F. Bradford Morse, William H. Bates, Joseph W. Martin Jr., and Hastings Keith, voted in favor of the Medicare health program.

In 1966, along with three Republican senators and four other Republican representatives, Conte signed a telegram sent to Georgia governor Carl E. Sanders regarding the Georgia legislature's refusal to seat the recently elected Julian Bond in their state House of Representatives. This refusal, said the telegram, was "a dangerous attack on representative government. None of us agree with Mr. Bond's views on the Vietnam War; in fact we strongly repudiate these views. But unless otherwise determined by a court of law, which the Georgia Legislature is not, he is entitled to express them."

A member of the Republican Party, Conte was part of what was then its liberal Northern tradition. Conte voted against U.S. involvement in the 1991 Gulf War, one of only three Republicans in the House to oppose the resolution, along with Frank Riggs (CA) and Connie Morella (MD).

On social issues, Conte's record was more conservative, also reflecting his Roman Catholic faith; for instance, he was opposed to abortion. He encouraged a generation of young activists whom he hired as staff. For instance, Betty Boothroyd worked for him as a legislative assistant between 1960 and 1962; she later became Speaker of the House of Commons of the United Kingdom.

== Death and burial ==
Conte died at age 69 of prostate cancer in Bethesda, Maryland, on February 8, 1991. He is buried in St. Joseph's Cemetery in his home town of Pittsfield. More than 5,000 of his constituents waited in line in 5 °F (−15 °C) weather to attend his wake at tiny All Souls Church, his childhood church, in Pittsfield.

His funeral was attended by four U.S. Cabinet secretaries, 100 members of Congress, and the sitting vice president of the United States, Dan Quayle. He was eulogized by long-time political friends Tip O'Neill (former U.S. Speaker of the House) and Senator Edward Kennedy.

He was survived by his wife Corinne (née Duval), and their four children. John Olver, a Democrat, succeeded him in Congress.

== Legacy and honors ==
- 1963: awarded the Commander of the Order of Merit of the Italian Republic for his work in support of the North Atlantic Treaty Organization (NATO).
- 1988, Conte Forum, a multi-purpose sports arena at Boston College, is named for him.
- The Silvio O. Conte National Fish and Wildlife Refuge in Massachusetts, Vermont, New Hampshire, and Connecticut is named for him.
- The Silvio O. Conte National Center for Polymer Research at UMass Amherst was named in his honor, as was Building 49 of the National Institutes of Health (NIH) in Bethesda, Maryland.
- Several universities have established Silvio O. Conte Centers for neuroscience research.
- The National Archives regional center in Pittsfield is named after Conte.
- West Side Elementary School in Pittsfield was renamed Silvio O. Conte Community School after his death.
- The former Silvio O. Conte Middle School, now Colegrove Park Elementary School, in North Adams, Massachusetts was named for him.
- Silvio O. Conte Anadromous Fish Research Center in Turners Falls, MA was founded by him and renamed in his honor after his death
- The Silvio O. Conte Federal Building in Pittsfield is named after Conte.

== See also ==
- Massachusetts legislature: 1951–1952, 1953–1954, 1955–1956
- List of members of the United States Congress who died in office (1950–1999)

Massachusetts Senate
Preceded by Michael H. Condron	Member of the Massachusetts Senate from the Berkshire district 1951–1959	Succeeded by Robert P. Cramer
U.S. House of Representatives
Preceded by John W. Heselton	Member of the U.S. House of Representatives from Massachusetts's 1st congressional district 1959–1991	Succeeded by John Olver
New office	Ranking Member of the House Small Business Committee; 1975–1979	Succeeded by Joseph M. McDade
Preceded by Al Cederberg	Ranking Member of the House Appropriations Committee; 1979–1991	Succeeded by Joseph M. McDade
