= John Brox =

American farmer and politician

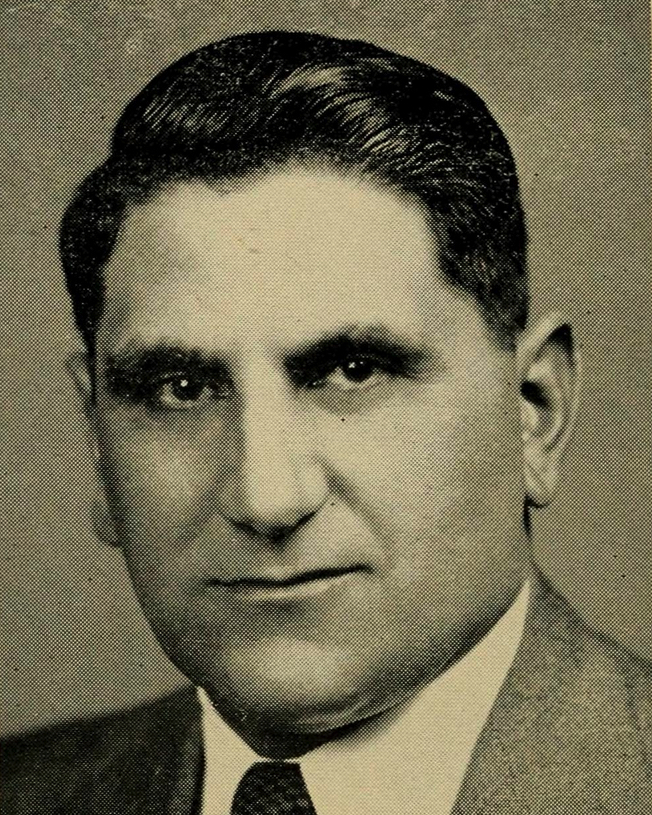

Member of the Massachusetts House of Representatives from the 19th Middlesex district
- In office January 1949 – January 6, 1965
- Preceded by: Harold E. Tivey
- Succeeded by: Felix Perrault

Personal details
- Born: Felix Raymond Perrault; November 16, 1910 Dracut, Massachusetts, U.S.
- Died: December 30, 1995 (aged 85) Lowell, Massachusetts, U.S.
- Party: Republican
- Spouse: Antoinette Rossi
- Education: UMass Amherst

John Brox (November 16, 1910 – December 30, 1995) was an American farmer and politician who served in the Massachusetts House of Representatives. A member of the Republican Party, he was defeated for reelection in a new district in 1964 by Felix Perrault.

== See also ==
- Massachusetts legislature: 1949–1950, 1951–1952, 1953–1954, 1955–1956
