= Michael F. Skerry =

American politician (1909-1989)

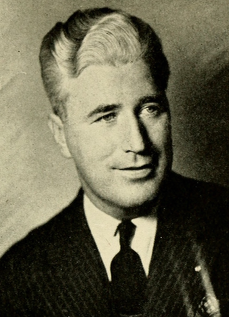

Speaker of the Massachusetts House of Representatives
- In office 1955–1957
- Preceded by: Charles Gibbons
- Succeeded by: John F. Thompson

Personal details
- Born: January 3, 1909 Medford, Massachusetts
- Died: September 30, 1989 (aged 80) Laconia, New Hampshire
- Party: Democratic Party
- Profession: Salesman, Politician, Clerk of Courts

Michael Francis Skerry (January 3, 1909 – September 28, 1989) was a Massachusetts legislator; he served in the Massachusetts House of Representatives for six terms, from 1941–1957, and was the speaker from 1955 to 1957. Skerry served as delegate from the 8th District of Middlesex County to the Democratic National Convention from Massachusetts in 1944 and again in 1956. Michael Skerry began his political career in 1936 when he was elected to the Medford Board of Aldermen, representing Ward 1 for four years. After leaving the Massachusetts Legislature, Skerry served as clerk of the Malden District Court from 1957 to 1978. Michael Skerry died on September 30, 1989.

The personal papers of Michael Skerry which document his career in the Massachusetts House of Representatives from 1955–1959 are contained in the John F. Kennedy Library National Archives and Records Administration, Boston Massachusetts.

== See also ==
- Massachusetts legislature: 1941–1942, 1943–1944, 1945–1946, 1947–1948, 1949–1950, 1951–1952, 1953–1954, 1955–1956

Massachusetts House of Representatives
Preceded by Charles Gibbons	Speaker of the Massachusetts House of Representatives; 1955 — 1957	Succeeded by John F. Thompson
