= Fred I. Lamson =

American politician (1910–1981)

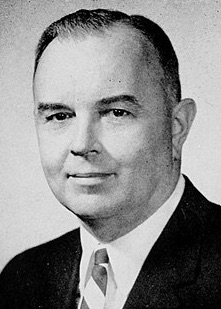
- Fred Lamson, circa 1967

Minority Leader of the Massachusetts Senate
- In office 1959–1963
- Preceded by: John E. Powers
- Succeeded by: Philip A. Graham

Member of the Massachusetts Senate from the 4th Middlesex District
- In office 1953–1973
- Preceded by: Sumner G. Whittier
- Succeeded by: Stephen McGrail

Mayor of Malden, Massachusetts
- In office 1948–1957
- Preceded by: John D. McCarthy
- Succeeded by: Walter J. Kelliher

Personal details
- Born: December 11, 1910 Stonington, Maine
- Died: December 24, 1981 (aged 71) Malden, Massachusetts
- Party: Republican
- Occupation: Merchant

Fred Irvin Lamson (1910-1981) was an American politician who served as Mayor of Malden, Massachusetts and was a member of the Massachusetts Senate.

== Early life ==
Lamson was born on December 11, 1910, in Stonington, Maine. He graduated from Everett High School in Everett, Massachusetts. In 1934 he opened Lamson and Davis Hardware with his father-in-law.

== Politics ==
Lamson served on the Malden Common Council from 1940 to 1941. He then served as an Alderman until 1943 when he unsuccessfully challenged incumbent John D. McCarthy for the mayoralty. In 1944 he was elected to the Massachusetts House of Representatives. The following year he once again lost to McCarthy in the mayors race. In 1947 he defeated McCarthy 8720 votes to 8042. He remained Mayor until 1957.

From 1953 to 1973, Lamson represented the 4th Middlesex District in the Massachusetts Senate. He was the Senate Minority Leader from 1959 to 1963. From 1973 to 1979 he was the state's deputy commissioner of public safety.

== Death ==
Lamson died on December 24, 1981, in Malden Hospital.

== See also ==
- 1945–1946 Massachusetts legislature
- 1947–1948 Massachusetts legislature
- 1955–1956 Massachusetts legislature
