= Charles John Innes =

American politician (1901-1971)

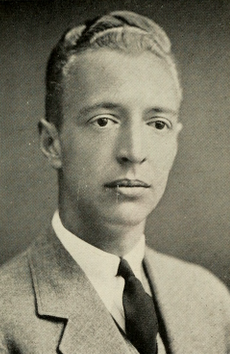
- Portrait of Charles John Innes

Legal Counsel to the Massachusetts Senate
- In office 1956–1971
- Preceded by: Thomas R. Bateman
- Succeeded by: James McIntyre

Member of the Massachusetts Senate from the 3rd Suffolk District
- In office 1943–1956
- Preceded by: Laurence Curtis
- Succeeded by: John Yerxa

Personal details
- Born: June 1, 1901 New York City
- Died: November 27, 1971 (aged 70) Boston
- Party: Republican
- Education: Harvard University; Boston University Law School

Charles John Innes (June 1, 1901 – November 27, 1971) was an American politician who served as a member of the Massachusetts General Court and was the legal counsel to the Massachusetts Senate.

Innes was born on June 1, 1901, in New York City. His father, Charles Hiller Innes, was a Massachusetts Republican Party leader. Innes graduated from Harvard College in 1922 and the Boston University School of Law in 1926.

From 1927 to 1930, Innes was assistant corporation counsel for the city of Boston. From 1933 to 1943 he was a member of the Massachusetts House of Representatives. He then represented the 3rd Suffolk District in the Massachusetts Senate. From 1947 to 1949 and again from 1951 to 1955 he was the Republican floor leader. In 1956, Innes was named legal counsel to the Senate. He held this position until June 1971, when ill health forced him to step down. He was allowed to stay on as associate counsel until his death on November 27, 1971.

== See also ==
- Massachusetts legislature: 1933–1934, 1935–1936, 1937–1938, 1939, 1941–1942, 1943–1944, 1947–1948, 1949–1950, 1951–1952, 1953–1954, 1955–1956
