= Charles Gibbons =

American politician (1901–1968)

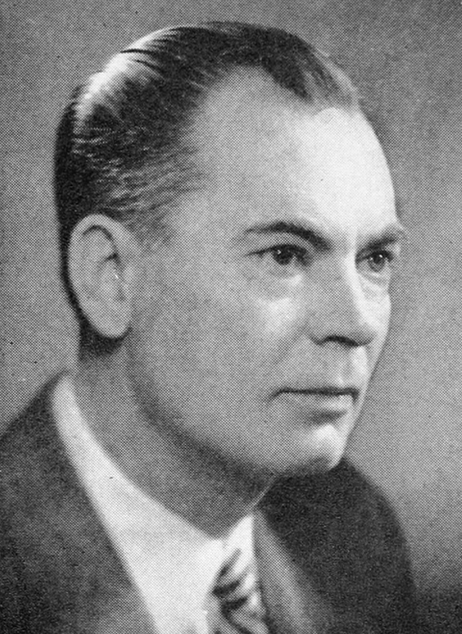
- Charles Gibbons, circa 1953

Commissioner of Administration and Finance
- In office 1961–1962
- Governor: John A. Volpe
- Preceded by: Charles F. Mahoney
- Succeeded by: William Waldron

Speaker of the Massachusetts House of Representatives
- In office 1953–1955
- Preceded by: Tip O'Neill
- Succeeded by: Michael F. Skerry

Minority Leader of the Massachusetts House of Representatives
- In office 1955–1957
- Preceded by: Robert F. Murphy
- Succeeded by: Frank S. Giles
- In office 1949–1953
- Preceded by: Tip O'Neill
- Succeeded by: Robert F. Murphy

Personal details
- Born: July 21, 1901 Grider, Kentucky, U.S.
- Died: February 2, 1968 (aged 66) Damariscotta, Maine, U.S.
- Party: Republican
- Spouse: Lillian Gibbons
- Education: Barboursville Baptist College
- Profession: Parcel delivery

Charles Gibbons (born July 21, 1901 – February 2, 1968) was a U.S. politician who served as the Speaker of the Massachusetts House of Representatives from 1953 to 1955 as a Republican. As of 2026, he was the last Republican to serve as Speaker of the Massachusetts House.

== Early life ==
Gibbons was born on July 21, 1901, in a log cabin on his family's farm in Grider, Kentucky. His father was a Baptist minister. Gibbons attended Barboursville Baptist College with the intention on becoming a teacher. From 1919 to 1925 he served in the United States Navy. He later worked for the Postal Telegraph Company. In 1932 he started The Minute Man Messenger Service.

== Political career ==
In 1940, Gibbons was an unsuccessful candidate for the Stoneham, Massachusetts Board of Selectmen. He ran again the following year and was elected easily. In 1942 he was elected to the Massachusetts House of Representatives. Gibbons soon became a major figure in state Republican politics. In 1949 he was elected Republican floor leader and four years later was elected Speaker of the House. The Republicans lost control of the House in 1955 and Gibbons spent the next two years as Minority Leader. In 1956, Gibbons was the Republican nominee for lieutenant governor, but lost to Robert F. Murphy. After the election he was elected Chairman of the Massachusetts Republican State Committee. In 1958, following the death of the Republicans' only gubernatorial candidate, George Fingold, Gibbons ran for the party's nomination as a write-in candidate. He won the nomination, but lost the general election to incumbent Foster Furcolo 56%-43%.

== Commissioner of Administration and Finance ==
In 1961, Governor John A. Volpe appointed Gibbons to the position of Commissioner of Administration and Finance. After accepting the job he moved to Beacon Hill. In 1962 he was appointed Chairman of the State Government Center Commission.

On May 8, 1964, Gibbons was indicted on 23 counts of accepting bribes during his tenure as Commissioner of Administration and Finance. He was one of twenty-six people indicted by a special grand jury investigating corruption.

After over three and a half years without a trial, the Massachusetts Supreme Judicial Court ordered the Attorney General to start the trial by January 8, 1968. On January 8, Assistant Attorney General Richard E. Backman told Suffolk Superior Court Judge Felix Forte that the government was "unable to proceed" and Forte dismissed all of the charges against Gibbons.

Two days after the charges against him were dropped, Gibbons, who had been in ill health for some time, entered the hospital. He died on February 2, 1968.

== Later life and death ==
Gibbons spent his later years in Wiscasset, Maine.

== See also ==
- Massachusetts legislature: 1943–1944, 1945–1946, 1947–1948, 1949–1950, 1951–1952, 1953–1954, 1955–1956
- Massachusetts House of Representatives' 22nd Middlesex district

Massachusetts House of Representatives
Preceded by Thomas P. O'Neill	Speaker of the Massachusetts House of Representatives; 1953–1955	Succeeded by Michael F. Skerry
Party political offices
Preceded by Ralph H. Bonnell	Chairman of the Massachusetts Republican State Committee; 1956–1958	Succeeded by Daniel E. McLean
Preceded by Sumner G. Whittier	Republican nominee for Lieutenant Governor of Massachusetts; 1956	Succeeded by Elmer C. Nelson
Preceded by Sumner G. Whittier	Republican nominee for Governor of Massachusetts; 1958	Succeeded by John Volpe
