= Anthony M. Scibelli =

American politician (1911–1998)

Anthony Moreno Scibelli
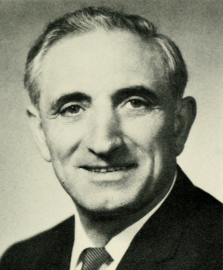
- Portrait of Anthony Moreno Scibelli

Member of the Massachusetts House of Representatives from the 10th Hampden district
- In office 1950 – October 16, 1999
- Preceded by: Daniel J. Bresnahan
- Succeeded by: Cheryl Coakley-Rivera

Personal details
- Born: October 16, 1911 Springfield, Massachusetts, US
- Died: September 18, 1998 (aged 86) Springfield, Massachusetts, US
- Resting place: Saint Michaels Cemetery
- Party: Democratic
- Spouse: Lea (Baraldi) Scibelli

Anthony M. Scibelli (1911-1998) was the longest-serving representative in the history of the Massachusetts House of Representatives. He served the South End of Springfield, Massachusetts, the Tenth District in Hampden County, for 48 years, until he died in 1999.

== Early life ==
Anthony M. Scibelli was born Antony Moreno Scibelli in Springfield, Massachusetts, on October 16, 1911. He was the son of recent immigrants from Italy, Andrea Scibelli and Filomena Ciccarella. Anthony was born at home on Water Street in the South End, a center of Italian community in Springfield.

Anthony has an older brother and two younger sisters. There was also an older son named Anthony who died in infancy.

His father, Andrea, was a laborer, then a barber in 1911. In 1920, he managed a billiards parlor. In 1930, the year before Anthony graduated from Cathedral High School, his father, called Andrew Scibelli, worked as a real estate agent.

== Political career ==
In 1937, Anthony M. Scibelli entered local politics as a Democrat. The impetus for his decision was a local trucking company that, in Scibelli's view, enjoyed an unfair advantage in securing contracts with the city. He ran for city council and served for twelve years.

In 1950, Scibelli was elected to the Massachusetts House of Representatives. He served for forty-eight years, setting the record for the Massachusetts House of Representatives. In 1999, his record was exceeded by just two other state legislators in the United States.

Tony Scibelli was known as a man of the people. He attributed his longevity as a politician to the personal satisfaction he derived from helping others. He was known as "The Dean" of the House.

In 1965, he was appointed chair of the powerful Ways and Means Committee in the Massachusetts House of Representatives.

== Real Estate ==
In addition to his civil service, Scibelli was a real estate broker. He owned property in Blandford, Vineyard Haven, Agawam, East Longmeadow, Wilbraham and Springfield, in Massachusetts. In Florida, he owned condominiums in Fort Lauderdale and Lauderdale Lakes, and an apartment in Hollywood.

== Personal life ==
In 1940, Scibelli married his high school classmate, Lea Baraldi. They had no children.

He was a member of the Knights of Columbus, Elks, Eagles, Sons of Italy, and the Ludlow Country Club.

Scibelli had a son around 1964 with Shirley A. Fowell, who was named Michael A. Mellberg. Mellberg changed his name to Michael A. Scibelli in 1986.

In March 1989, Anthony and Lea Scibelli donated $30,000 to an endowment fund at Cathedral High School, their alma mater.

== Connection to Al Bruno ==
In April 1989, Anthony M. Scibelli wrote a letter of reference to the state Advisory Board of Pardons on behalf of Springfield Mafia boss Adolfo "Big Al" Bruno. Bruno wanted a pardon for a 1966 conviction for possession of stolen goods: a crime he denied committing. Parole board member and future Springfield mayor Michael J. Albano was quoted in the news, saying the pardon was unlikely to be approved.

== Death ==
Scibelli died from pneumonia on 18 September 1998. He was 86. Although he was too ill to campaign or even vote in the primary election, Scibelli won his party's nomination to retain his position as House representative for the Tenth District.

A bust bearing his likeness was unveiled on the one-year anniversary of his death. The bust was stolen from its location outside the Mount Carmel Society, and its base damaged, in 2016.

Lea B. Scibelli, his widow, died at the age of 105 from COVID-19 on May 18, 2020 in Agawam.

== See also ==
- 1951–1952 Massachusetts legislature
- 1953–1954 Massachusetts legislature
- 1955–1956 Massachusetts legislature
