= Gladys Crockett =

American politician

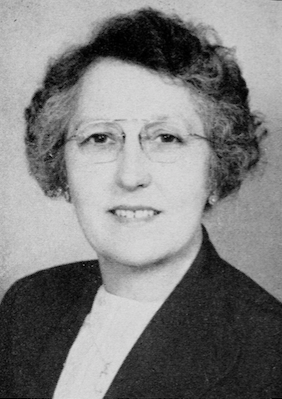

Member of the Massachusetts House of Representatives from the 9th Worcester district
- In office 1953–1954

Gladys Gertrude Crockett (born December 1, 1895) was an American Republican politician from Upton, Massachusetts. She represented the 9th Worcester district in the Massachusetts House of Representatives from 1953 to 1954.
