= Sidney Curtiss =

American politician (1917-1994)

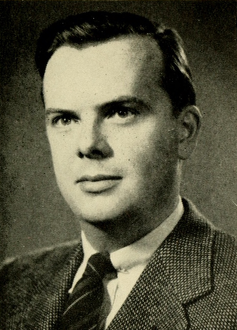

Minority Leader of the Massachusetts House of Representatives
- In office 1961–1971
- Preceded by: Frank S. Giles
- Succeeded by: Francis W. Hatch, Jr.

Member of the Massachusetts House of Representatives from the 6th Berkshire district
- In office 1949–1979
- Preceded by: District created
- Succeeded by: District eliminated

Personal details
- Born: September 4, 1917 Sheffield, Massachusetts
- Died: January 24, 1994 (aged 76) Lenox, Massachusetts
- Party: Republican
- Education: Harvard College; Boston University Law School
- Occupation: Lawyer; Politician

Sidney Quinn Curtiss (September 4, 1917 – January 24, 1994) was an American politician who was a member of the Massachusetts House of Representatives from 1949 to 1979.

== Early life ==
Curtiss was born on September 4, 1917, in Sheffield, Massachusetts. He attended St. Paul's School and graduated from Harvard College in 1940. He served in the United States Army during World War II. He graduated from Boston University Law School in 1947.

== Political career ==
Curtiss was a longtime officeholder in Sheffield. From 1948 to 1977 he was town counsel. From 1951 to 1977 he was town moderator. He also served on the town's board of assessors.

Curtiss represented the 6th Berkshire district in the Massachusetts House of Representatives from 1949 to 1979. From 1961 to 1971 he was House minority leader.

== Death ==
Curtiss died on January 24, 1999, in Lenox, Massachusetts.

== See also ==
- Massachusetts legislature: 1949–1950, 1951–1952, 1953–1954, 1955–1956
