= Christian A. Herter Jr. =

American politician

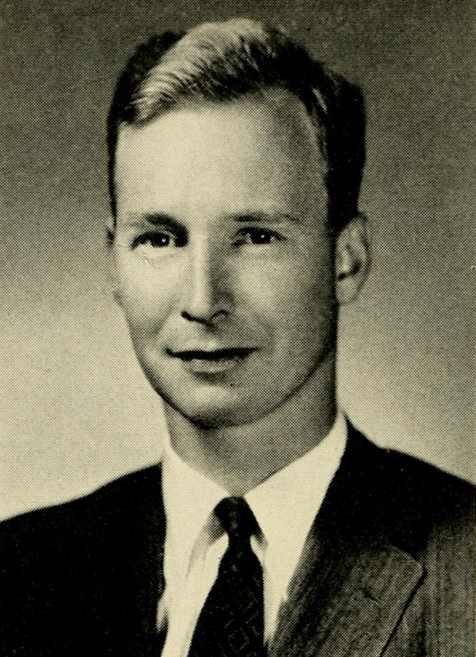

Member of the Massachusetts Governor's Council for the 3rd District
- In office 1957–1959
- Preceded by: Endicott Peabody
- Succeeded by: Edward J. Cronin

Member of the Massachusetts House of Representatives for the 4th Middlesex District
- In office 1951–1953

Personal details
- Born: Christian Archibald Herter Jr. January 29, 1919 Brooklyn, New York, U.S.
- Died: September 16, 2007 (aged 88) Washington D.C., U.S.
- Party: Republican
- Education: Harvard College; Harvard Law School

Christian Archibald Herter Jr. (January 29, 1919 – September 16, 2007) was an American politician, diplomat, academic, and vice president of Mobile Oil Corporation. He was also the first chairman of the New York Urban Coalition.

== Early life ==
Herter was born Brooklyn, New York and grew up in Boston, Massachusetts. His parents were Mary Catherine (nee Pratt) and Christian A. Herter, a U.S. Congressman, Governor of Massachusetts, and the United States Secretary of State. His maternal great-grandfather was Charles Pratt, a partner in Standard Oil of New Jersey and the founder of the Pratt Institute in Brooklyn, New York.

He received his B.A. from Harvard University.

Herter joined the U.S. Army in 1941, before the Pearl Harbor attack. In World War II, Herter was an officer in Europe, serving as an intelligence officer with the 14th Armored Division and was wounded by artillery shrapnel. He was awarded the Purple Heart and a Bronze Star.

After the war, he graduated from Harvard Law School in 1948.

== Career ==
Herter joined the Boston law firm of Bingham, Dana & Gould, where he became an authority on helping U.S. companies trying to expand into the international market

In 1950, he was elected to the Massachusetts House of Representatives as the representative for West Newton. He was re-elected in 1952. However, he resigned from office when his father became governor. "I found it difficult to represent Newton," he told the Boston Globe, "while I was almost unanimously regarded as spokesman for my father."

In 1953 he became an aide to Vice President Richard Nixon and traveled with Nixon on his first tour of Asia that same year. After working with Nixon, Herter became the general counsel to the Foreign Operations Administration, an overseas aid program then led by former Minnesota Governor Harold E. Stassen. Herter returned to Massachusetts in the mid-1950s and served one term on the Governor's Council.

Believing the Democratic leadership at the State House had ignored development and turned the state into an economic shell, he decided to run against Governor Foster Furcolo, a Democrat. He failed to win the support of the Republican Party of Massachusetts convention in the summer, however, and withdrew to support the nominee, Massachusetts Attorney General George Fingold.

The party backed Herter to run for attorney general. He lost the general election to Democrat Edward J. McCormack.

In 1961 Herter joined the Mobil Oil Corporation, becoming its vice president by 1967. New York Mayor John V. Lindsay asked Herter to serve on the New York Urban Coalition in 1967. Herter was a founding member of the coalition of business, labor, and neighborhood leaders who worked to improve New York's slums. Herter was the group's first chairman, serving from 1967 to 1969.

In 1970 President Nixon appointed Herter the deputy assistant secretary of state for environmental and population affairs. Next Herter became a professor of environmental law at the University of New Mexico. He also taught international law at the Johns Hopkins University School of Advanced International Studies.

In 1983, President Ronald Reagan appointed him deputy United States commissioner on the International Whaling Commission. Herter later served as chairman of the U.S. Section of the International Joint Commission of the United States and Canada.

== Personal life ==
Herter first married Suzanne Clery (later Treadway). They had three children before divorcing. Next, he married Susan Cable, but that marriage also ended in divorce. His third marriage was to Catherine Hooker.

He was a member of the Council on Foreign Relations, the Metropolitan Club, the Cosmos Club and the Chevy Chase Club.

In 2007, Herter died at his home in Washington D.C. of chronic obstructive pulmonary disease at the age of 88 years.

== See also ==
- 1951–1952 Massachusetts legislature
- 1953–1954 Massachusetts legislature

Party political offices
Preceded by George Fingold	Republican nominee for Attorney General of Massachusetts; 1958	Succeeded by George Michaels
