= William E. Hays =

Massachusetts politician (1903–1999)

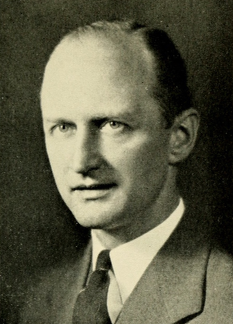

Member of the Massachusetts Senate from the 5th Middlesex district
- In office 1957–1964

Member of the Massachusetts House of Representatives from the 7th Middlesex district
- In office 1943–1956

Personal details
- Born: November 28, 1903 Emmitsburg, Maryland, US
- Died: October 23, 1999 (aged 95) Bedford, Massachusetts, US
- Education: Lafayette College (BA); Harvard Law School (LLB)

William E. Hays (November 28, 1903 – October 23, 1999) was an American politician who was the member of the Massachusetts House of Representatives from the 7th Middlesex district and a member of the Massachusetts Senate from the 5th Middlesex distract.
