= Stephen T. Chmura =

American politician (1916–1967)

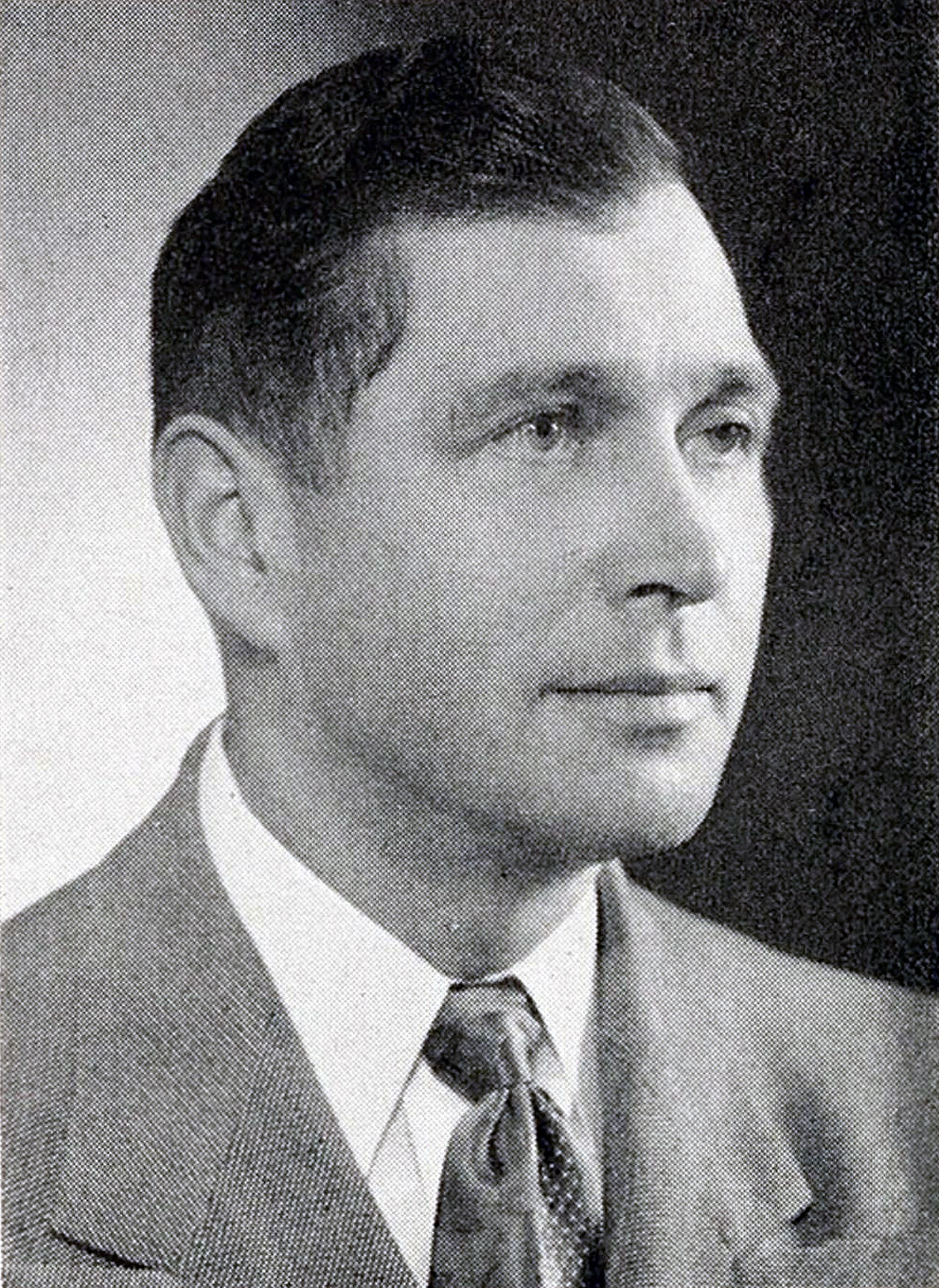

Member of the Massachusetts House of Representatives from the 12th Hampden district
- In office 1951 – August 30, 1967

Personal details
- Born: August 25, 1916; Holyoke, Massachusetts, U.S.
- Died: August 30, 1967 (aged 51); Holyoke, Massachusetts, U.S.
- Political party: Democratic

Stephen Thomas Chmura (August 25, 1916 – August 30, 1967) was an American politician who served as a member of the Massachusetts House of Representatives from 1951 to 1967, representing the 12th Hampden district. He was a member of the Democratic Party.
