= John F. Thompson (politician) =

American politician (1920-1965)

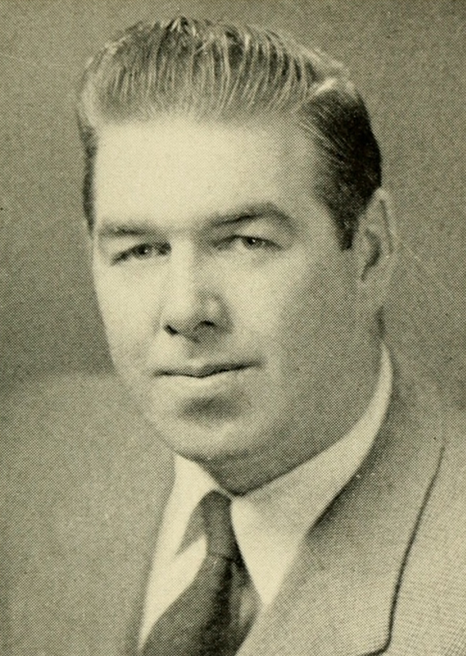
- John Forbes Thompson, circa 1953

Speaker of the Massachusetts House of Representatives
- In office 1958–1964
- Preceded by: Michael F. Skerry
- Succeeded by: John Davoren

Member of the Massachusetts House of Representatives from the 2nd Hampden district
- In office 1949–1973
- Preceded by: Frederick A. Warren
- Succeeded by: Iris K. Holland

Personal details
- Born: May 20, 1920 Ludlow, Massachusetts
- Died: August 12, 1965 (aged 45) Norwood, Massachusetts
- Party: Democratic Party
- Education: Boston University; Boston College Law School
- Profession: Public relations

John Forbes Thompson (May 20, 1920 – August 12, 1965) was a U.S. politician who was a member of the Massachusetts House of Representatives from 1949–1964. He served as the House Majority Leader from 1955 to 1957 and Speaker of the House from 1958 to 1964.

Thompson continued to hold the office of speaker in 1964 following a bribery indictment, but did not preside during a debate on a motion to declare the office vacant, which was defeated on May 11, 1964. Nor did he preside from the rostrum for the remainder of the annual session that ended in the early morning of July 4, 1964. He was reelected as State Representative in November, 1964. He was not a candidate for Speaker when the House convened in 1965. He died before the bribery case was resolved.

John F. Thompson Hall, a center for social and behavioral science classrooms and offices at the University of Massachusetts Amherst, is named after him.

== See also ==
- Massachusetts legislature: 1949–1950, 1953–1954, 1955–1956, 1957–1958, 1959–1960, 1961–1962, 1963–1964
- Massachusetts House of Representatives' 2nd Hampden district

Massachusetts House of Representatives
Preceded by Michael F. Skerry	Speaker of the Massachusetts House of Representatives; 1958 — 1964	Succeeded by John Davoren
