= 1963–1964 Massachusetts legislature =

163rd Massachusetts General Court
←	162nd	164th	→

Overview
- Legislative body: General Court
- Term: January 2, 1963 – July 4, 1964

Senate
- Members: 40
- President: John E. Powers
- Majority Leader: Maurice A. Donahue
- Minority Leader: Philip A. Graham
- Party control: Democrat

House
- Members: 240
- Speaker: John F. Thompson
- Majority Leader: John Davoren
- Majority Whip: Robert H. Quinn
- Minority Leader: Sidney Curtiss
- Minority Whip: Alfred R. Shrigley
- Party control: Democrat

John Powers, Senate president.

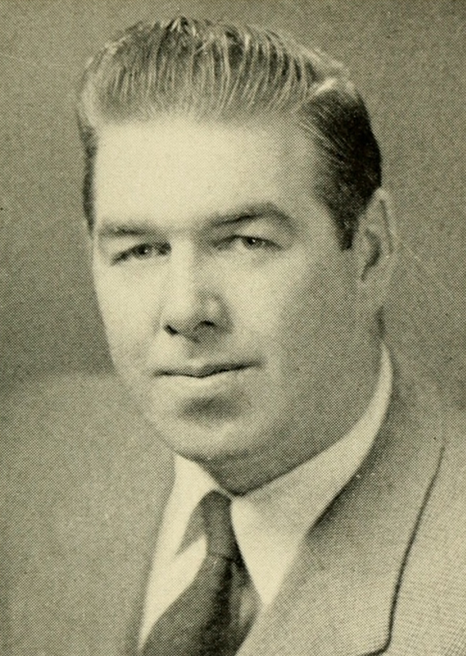
John Thompson, House speaker.

Leaders of the Massachusetts General Court, 1963-1964.

The 163rd Massachusetts General Court, consisting of the Massachusetts Senate and the Massachusetts House of Representatives, met in 1963 and 1964 during the governorship of Endicott Peabody. John E. Powers served as president of the Senate and John F. Thompson served as speaker of the House.

On May 9, 1964, a special grand jury indicted House speaker Thompson on 29 counts of bribery. On June 16, 1964, the General Court passed the bill establishing the University of Massachusetts Boston co-sponsored by Senate Majority Leader Maurice A. Donahue, Senator George V. Kenneally Jr., and House Majority Whip Robert H. Quinn along with a $200,000 appropriation.

== Senators ==
portrait	name	date of birth	district
	Oliver F. Ames	December 13, 1920	23rd Middlesex
	Paul H. Benoit	January 5, 1916	
	Charles A. Bisbee Jr.	June 8, 1918	
	James F. Burke	September 7, 1914	
	John J. Conte	May 3, 1930	
	Leslie Bradley Cutler	March 24, 1890	
	Maurice A. Donahue	September 12, 1918	2nd Hampden
	William Daniel Fleming	April 14, 1907	
	Mary L. Fonseca	March 30, 1915	
	A. Frank Foster	February 8, 1910	
	Michael J. Galvin	September 7, 1907	
	Joseph Francis Gibney	January 9, 1911	
	Philip A. Graham	May 21, 1910	3rd Essex
	George D. Hammond	October 29, 1906	
	John Edward Harrington Jr.	July 30, 1930	
	Kevin B. Harrington	January 9, 1929	
	William E. Hays	November 28, 1903	
	James W. Hennigan Jr.	March 27, 1927	
	Charles V. Hogan	April 12, 1897	
	Newland H. Holmes	August 30, 1891	
	Allan Francis Jones	June 29, 1921	
	George V. Kenneally Jr.	December 29, 1929	
	Fred I. Lamson	December 11, 1910	
	James J. Long	November 15, 1913	
	Francis X. McCann	September 2, 1912	
	James S. McCormack		
	Denis L. Mckenna	August 14, 1922	
	Charles William Olson	August 24, 1889	
	John Francis Parker	May 29, 1907	
	Philibert L. Pellegrini	September 4, 1918	
	John E. Powers	November 10, 1910	4th Suffolk
	James Paul Rurak	November 9, 1911	
	Harry Della Russo	May 26, 1907	
	Antone L. Silva		
	Edmund R. St. John Jr.	April 28, 1920	
	George A. Sullivan Jr.		
	Mario Umana	May 5, 1914	
	William X. Wall	July 1, 1904	
	Joseph D. Ward	March 26, 1914	
	Stanley John Zarod	April 11, 1920	

== Representatives ==
portrait	name	date of birth	district
	Walter T. Anderson	January 6, 1891	23rd Middlesex
	Julius Ansel	April 27, 1908	
	John A. Armstrong	June 12, 1901	
	Peter George Asiaf	August 15, 1905	
	Normand J. Babineau	January 4, 1928	
	John Dowkontt Barrus	August 19, 1924	
	David M. Bartley	February 9, 1935	
	Fred A. Baumeister	September 24, 1892	
	Raymond H. Beach	August 11, 1888	
	Roger L. Bernashe	September 9, 1927	
	John T. Berry	November 20, 1924	
	Francis Bevilacqua	August 12, 1923	
	Donald T. Bliss	1937	
	Belden Bly	September 29, 1914	
	Stanley Joseph Bocko	August 26, 1920	
	Robert Joseph Bohigian	July 24, 1922	
	Royal L. Bolling	June 19, 1920	
	Gordon Dickson Boynton	August 9, 1901	
	G. Edward Bradley	October 21, 1906	
	Joseph G. Bradley	June 14, 1930	
	John Cornelius Bresnahan	November 14, 1919	
	Joseph E. Brett	May 19, 1907	
	Alfred Sylvester Brothers	November 4, 1919	
	John Brox	November 16, 1910	
	John Patrick Buckley	1906	
	Thaddeus M. Buczko	February 23, 1926	
	Charles J. Buffone	1919	
	William Bulger	February 2, 1934	
	George H. Burgeson	December 25, 1907	
	Anthony Joseph Burke	July 17, 1931	
	Walter T. Burke	August 5, 1911	
	Louis Buttiglieri	May 18, 1916	
	Patrick Edmund Callaghan	August 13, 1895	
	Gardner E. Campbell	November 22, 1886	
	Levin H. Campbell	January 2, 1927	
	Raymond Edward Carey	January 6, 1899	
	William A. Carey	January 28, 1920	
	Daniel William Carney	August 17, 1925	
	Philip N. Carney	June 6, 1919	
	Ralph W. Cartwright Jr.	October 5, 1920	
	William J. Casey (Massachusetts politician)	June 27, 1905	
	Paul A. Cataldo	May 15, 1935	
	Michael Catino	February 21, 1904	
	Emmett J. Cauley	February 28, 1903	
	Paul J. Cavanaugh	February 22, 1936	
	Robert L. Cawley	July 30, 1934	
	Harrison Chadwick	February 25, 1903	
	Perlie Dyar Chase	July 31, 1905	
	Amelio Della Chiesa	July 31, 1901	
	Stephen T. Chmura	August 25, 1916	
	John George Clark	February 26, 1902	
	Thomas Francis Coady Jr.	May 8, 1905	
	Beryl Cohen	September 18, 1934	
	Keith E. Collins	April 24, 1929	
	Anthony M. Colonna	May 2, 1916	
	James Francis Condon	February 4, 1899	
	Lloyd E. Conn	November 26, 1904	
	William Augustine Connell, Jr	November 17, 1922	
	James C. Corcoran Jr.	September 22, 1926	
	Beatrice Corliss	October 21, 1910	
	Gilbert M. Coroa	January 13, 1925	
	Leo Joseph Cournoyer	December 11, 1905	
	Russell H. Craig	February 4, 1924	
	Robert Q. Crane	March 21, 1926	
	James J. Craven, Jr.	March 24, 1919	
	Wallace Boyd Crawford	November 19, 1908	
	John J. Cronin	August 1, 1910	
	Walter A. Cuffe	January 29, 1898	
	Sidney Curtiss	September 4, 1917	7th Berkshire
	Michael A. D'Avolio		
	Stephen Davenport	June 27, 1924	
	John Davoren	July 27, 1915	9th Worcester
	Joseph Del Grosso	July 25, 1904	
	James DeNormandie	November 10, 1907	
	Arthur Leo Desrocher	January 25, 1930	
	Theophile Jean DesRoches	June 27, 1902	
	Gerard F. Doherty	April 6, 1928	
	John F. Dolan	September 7, 1922	
	Thomas Francis Donohue	December 6, 1902	
	John F. Donovan Jr.	August 21, 1931	
	Harold Lawrence Dower	September 16, 1908	
	James P. Downey	January 9, 1911	
	Charles Robert Doyle	September 24, 1925	
	Charles E. Luke Driscoll	October 1, 1909	
	Michael Dukakis	November 3, 1933	
	Joseph D. Early	January 31, 1933	
	John Marshall Eaton Jr.	March 26, 1918	
	Arnold Irving Epstein	April 5, 1920	
	Thomas Francis Fallon	December 4, 1929	
	Manuel Faria	March 7, 1906	
	Thomas F. Farrell	October 10, 1897	
	Michael Paul Feeney	March 26, 1907	
	Cornelius T. Finnegan Jr.	December 13, 1918	
	William H. Finnegan	March 29, 1926	
	Irving Fishman	March 29, 1921	
	John Joseph Fitzgerald	February 28, 1918	
	Charles L. Flannery	March 22, 1920	
	Vernon R. Fletcher	February 8, 1924	
	Maurice Richard Flynn Jr.	December 20, 1917	
	Bernard J. Pat Foley	July 20, 1917	
	Jeremiah J. Foley	October 28, 1915	
	John Winslow Frenning	July 19, 1922	
	Albert A. Gammal Jr.	1928	
	Julie Gilligan	August 5, 1911	
	Ernest L. Goff Jr.	October 10, 1907	
	Robert C. Hahn	March 25, 1921	
	David Boyce Hamilton	December 4, 1890	
	Samuel Harmon	April 29, 1911	
	Edward D. Harrington Jr.	August 11, 1921	
	David E. Harrison	June 19, 1933	
	Francis W. Hatch Jr.	May 6, 1925	
	Winston Healy	October 20, 1937	
	Timothy William Hickey	February 14, 1938	
	Herbert B. Hollis	September 10, 1899	
	William P. Homans Jr.	March 18, 1921	
	Charles Iannello	April 25, 1906	
	John Peter Ivascyn	October 19, 1909	
	John Janas	September 4, 1910	
	Carl R. Johnson Jr.	August 22, 1926	
	William F. Joyce	July 26, 1909	
	Joseph M. Kearney	February 23, 1927	
	James A. Kelly Jr.	May 11, 1926	
	James H. Kelly	October 15, 1919	
	Archibald E. Kenefick	November 4, 1896	
	John P. Kennedy	February 24, 1918	
	Gregory Benjamin Khachadoorian	July 8, 1928	
	Cornelius F. Kiernan	August 15, 1917	
	Philip Kimball	June 6, 1918	
	William James Kingston	October 17, 1909	
	Edward P. Kirby	January 10, 1928	
	Benjamin Klebanow	November 2, 1900	
	Freyda Koplow	October 26, 1907	
	Walter Kostanski	December 10, 1923	
	Albert Kramer	July 4, 1933	
	Mitsie T. Kulig	May 18, 1921	
	Matthew J. Kuss	December 5, 1915	
	Richard E. Landry	May 29, 1936	
	Joseph A. Langone, III	January 25, 1917	
	Frank F. Lemos	January 6, 1901	
	David H. Locke	August 4, 1927	
	Gerald P. Lombard	January 4, 1916	
	John J. Long	December 10, 1927	
	William Longworth	August 17, 1914	
	William Q. MacLean Jr.	November 4, 1934	
	J. Robert Mahan	December 14, 1903	
	Donald J. Manning	June 23, 1929	
	Joseph F. McEvoy Jr.	April 27, 1918	
	Thomas W. McGee	May 24, 1924	
	Robert J. McGinn	December 18, 1918	
	John J. McGlynn	February 26, 1922	
	Allan McGuane	July 26, 1928	
	James McIntyre (politician)	May 25, 1930	
	Arthur James McKenna	October 29, 1914	
	George G. Mendonca	March 26, 1924	
	Paul C. Menton	April 15, 1925	
	William James Moran	June 24, 1921	
	William H. Mork	May 13, 1895	
	Gerald J. Morrissey	May 20, 1927	
	Edward S. Morrow	March 20, 1921	
	Edwin Herbert Morse	January 7, 1902	
	Charles A. Mullaly Jr.	September 28, 1910	
	James Gerard Mullen	May 5, 1922	
	Paul F. Murphy	October 14, 1932	
	Paul Maurice Murphy	February 24, 1932	
	Cornelius Joseph Murray	August 19, 1890	
	Lorenz Francis Muther Jr.	September 26, 1908	5th Middlesex
	John J. Navin	September 9, 1915	
	Michael Anthony Nazzaro Jr.	June 2, 1925	
	Patrick William Nee	November 22, 1938	
	Mary B. Newman	February 15, 1909	2nd Middlesex
	Thomas M. Newth	March 15, 1911	
	James R. Nolen	April 17, 1933	
	Leo James Normandin	December 14, 1922	
	James Anthony O'Brien, Jr	June 22, 1919	
	James Anthony O'Brien, Jr	June 22, 1919	
	Walter Wilson O'Brien	October 14, 1910	
	David J. O'Connor	November 9, 1924	
	George Henry O'Farrell	November 15, 1910	
	William F. Otis	October 12, 1903	
	Domenick S. Pasciucco	August 1, 1921	
	Albert P. Pettoruto	September 29, 1915	
	Vite Pigaga		
	Lincoln Pope Jr.	May 29, 1916	
	George William Porter	November 6, 1885	
	Philip Andrew Quinn	February 21, 1910	
	Robert H. Quinn	January 30, 1928	12th Suffolk
	William I. Randall	September 13, 1915	
	Paul de Hoff Reed Jr.		
	Leo Joseph Reynolds	February 29, 1920	
	Frank G. Rico	June 2, 1912	
	Daniel H. Rider	July 15, 1912	
	J. Hilary Rockett	January 16, 1935	
	Harold Rosen (politician)	1906	
	Nathan Rosenfeld	January 31, 1906	
	Raymond F. Rourke	October 10, 1917	
	George Sacco	July 19, 1936	
	Roger A. Sala	August 8, 1893	
	Joseph Douglas Saulnier	April 14, 1906	
	Anthony M. Scibelli	October 16, 1911	
	Vincent Joseph Shanley	January 27, 1916	
	Charles Louis Shea	June 28, 1927	
	Thomas A. Sheehan	March 21, 1933	
	Alfred R. Shrigley	June 6, 1914	3rd Plymouth
	Andre Rives Sigourney	June 30, 1927	
	Milton Raymond Silva	June 16, 1923	
	Michael John Simonelli	May 9, 1913	
	Saul Simons	February 5, 1906	
	George T. Smith	March 18, 1888	
	Lawrence Philip Smith	December 4, 1919	
	George William Spartichino	June 11, 1924	
	George I. Spatcher	February 2, 1902	
	Janet Kirkland Starr	October 11, 1918	
	C. Clifford Stone	August 20, 1897	
	Joseph A. Sylvia	August 19, 1892	
	Frank Daniel Tanner	February 3, 1888	
	John F. Thompson	May 20, 1920	2nd Hampden
	George Breed Thomson	January 10, 1921	
	John Joseph Toomey	March 25, 1909	
	Joseph Thomas Travaline		
	Henry Andrews Turner	March 22, 1887	
	Warren A. Turner	January 25, 1905	
	Leo J. Turo	December 11, 1923	
	John Taylor Tynan	June 7, 1920	
	Theodore Jack Vaitses	May 8, 1901	
	Dave Norman Vigneault	September 3, 1936	
	George B. Walsh	March 21, 1907	
	Joseph B. Walsh	November 15, 1923	
	Martin H. Walsh	July 31, 1916	
	Chester H. Waterous	November 18, 1905	
	Stephen Weekes	February 1, 1925	
	Norman S. Weinberg	1919	
	Benjamin Horace White	April 11, 1902	
	Thomas M. White		
	John W. Whittemore	January 30, 1906	
	Harold H. Wicher		
	Arthur Williams	December 14, 1915	
	Thomas Casmere Wojtkowski	September 18, 1926	
	Albert H. Zabriskie	December 7, 1917	
	Edward S. Zelazo	May 27, 1924	
	Paul G. Zollo	August 26, 1904	

== See also ==
- 88th United States Congress
- List of Massachusetts General Courts
