= 1965–1966 Massachusetts legislature =

164th Massachusetts General Court
←	163rd	165th	→

Overview
- Legislative body: General Court
- Term: January 6, 1965 – September 7, 1966

Senate
- Members: 40
- President: Maurice A. Donahue
- Majority Leader: Kevin B. Harrington
- Minority Leader: Philip A. Graham
- Party control: Democrat

House
- Members: 240
- Speaker: John Davoren
- Majority Leader: Robert H. Quinn
- Majority Whip: Theophile Jean DesRoches
- Minority Leader: Sidney Curtiss
- Minority Whip: Thomas M. Newth
- Party control: Democrat

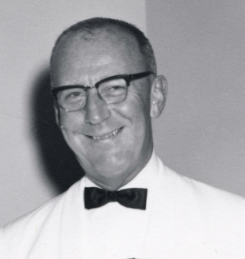
Maurice Donahue, Senate president.

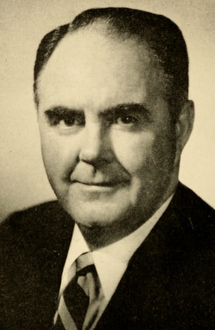
John Davoren, House speaker.

Leaders of the Massachusetts General Court, 1965-1966.

The 164th Massachusetts General Court, consisting of the Massachusetts Senate and the Massachusetts House of Representatives, met in 1965 and 1966 during the governorship of John Volpe. Maurice A. Donahue served as president of the Senate and John Davoren served as speaker of the House. On April 22, 1965, Rev. Martin Luther King Jr. delivered an address to a joint session of the General Court after meeting with Massachusetts Governor John Volpe. In the same month, Volpe filed a request for legislation from the state legislature that defined schools with nonwhite enrollments greater than 50 percent to be imbalanced and granted the State Board of Education the power to withhold state funds from any school district in the state that was found to have racial imbalance, which Volpe would sign into law the following August.

== Senators ==
portrait	name	date of birth	district
	Oliver F. Ames	December 13, 1920	3rd Suffolk
	Charles A. Bisbee Jr.	June 8, 1918	
	James F. Burke	September 7, 1914	
	Beryl Cohen	September 18, 1934	
	John J. Conte	May 3, 1930	
	Leslie Bradley Cutler	March 24, 1890	
	Stephen Davenport	June 27, 1924	
	James DeNormandie	November 10, 1907	
	Maurice A. Donahue	September 12, 1918	
	Mary L. Fonseca	March 30, 1915	
	Philip A. Graham	May 21, 1910	
	George D. Hammond	October 29, 1906	
	Kevin B. Harrington	January 9, 1929	
	John Edward Harrington Jr.	July 30, 1930	
	Charles V. Hogan	April 12, 1897	
	Allan Francis Jones	June 29, 1921	
	James A. Kelly Jr.	May 11, 1926	
	George V. Kenneally Jr.	December 29, 1929	
	Fred I. Lamson	December 11, 1910	
	James J. Long	November 15, 1913	
	Francis X. McCann	September 2, 1912	
	James McIntyre (politician)	May 25, 1930	
	Denis L. Mckenna	August 14, 1922	
	Joe Moakley	April 27, 1927	
	Andrea F. Nuciforo Sr.	July 14, 1927	
	John Francis Parker	May 29, 1907	
	Philibert L. Pellegrini	September 4, 1918	
	Vite Pigaga		
	John M. Quinlan	July 11, 1935	
	Philip Andrew Quinn	February 21, 1910	
	William I. Randall	September 13, 1915	
	James Paul Rurak	November 9, 1911	
	Harry Della Russo	May 26, 1907	
	Mario Umana	May 5, 1914	
	William X. Wall	July 1, 1904	
	Joseph D. Ward	March 26, 1914	
	William D. Weeks	May 9, 1926	
	Stanley John Zarod	April 11, 1920	

== Representatives ==
portrait	name	date of birth	district
	Antone S. Aguiar Jr.	January 2, 1930	5th Bristol
	David C. Ahearn	July 28, 1929	
	Robert B. Ambler	1927	
	John A. Armstrong	June 12, 1901	
	Peter George Asiaf	August 15, 1905	
	Jack Backman	April 26, 1922	
	Wilfred E. Balthazar	July 17, 1914	
	David L. Barrett	February 4, 1920	
	John Dowkontt Barrus	August 19, 1924	
	David M. Bartley	February 9, 1935	
	Robert A. Belmonte	July 2, 1930	
	Roger L. Bernashe	September 9, 1927	
	John T. Berry	November 20, 1924	
	Francis Bevilacqua	August 12, 1923	
	Donald T. Bliss	1937	
	Belden Bly	September 29, 1914	
	Stanley Joseph Bocko	August 26, 1920	
	Robert Joseph Bohigian	July 24, 1922	
	Royal L. Bolling	June 19, 1920	
	Joseph G. Bradley	June 14, 1930	
	John Cornelius Bresnahan	November 14, 1919	
	Joseph E. Brett	May 19, 1907	
	John R. Buckley	1932	
	Charles J. Buffone	1919	
	William Bulger	February 2, 1934	
	Anthony Joseph Burke	July 17, 1931	
	George G. Burke	August 3, 1932	
	Walter T. Burke	August 5, 1911	
	William Francis Butters		
	Louis Buttiglieri	May 18, 1916	
	Fred F. Cain	November 5, 1909	
	Eleanor Campobasso	August 10, 1923	
	Raymond Edward Carey	January 6, 1899	
	William A. Carey	January 28, 1920	
	Philip N. Carney	June 6, 1919	
	Daniel William Carney	August 17, 1925	
	Ralph W. Cartwright Jr.	October 5, 1920	
	Paul A. Cataldo	May 15, 1935	
	Michael Catino	February 21, 1904	
	Emmett J. Cauley	February 28, 1903	
	Paul J. Cavanaugh	February 22, 1936	
	Robert L. Cawley	July 30, 1934	
	Harrison Chadwick	February 25, 1903	
	Amelio Della Chiesa	July 31, 1901	
	Stephen T. Chmura	August 25, 1916	
	John George Clark	February 26, 1902	
	Thomas Francis Coady Jr.	May 8, 1905	
	Abraham L. Cohn	May 24, 1898	
	Lincoln P. Cole, Jr.	September 18, 1918	
	Andrew Collaro	March 21, 1910	
	H. Thomas Colo	December 27, 1929	
	James Francis Condon	February 4, 1899	
	Lloyd E. Conn	November 26, 1904	
	William Augustine Connell, Jr	November 17, 1922	
	George Thomas Contalonis		
	Leo Joseph Cournoyer	December 11, 1905	
	Edward P. Coury	October 19, 1927	
	Russell H. Craig	February 4, 1924	
	James J. Craven, Jr.	March 24, 1919	
	John J. Cronin	August 1, 1910	
	Sidney Curtiss	September 4, 1917	
	John Davoren	July 27, 1915	
	John Joseph Desmond	July 1, 1930	
	Arthur Leo Desrocher	January 25, 1930	
	Theophile Jean DesRoches	June 27, 1902	
	Edward J. Dever, Jr	June 21, 1936	
	Joseph DiCarlo	March 21, 1936	
	Edward M. Dickson	March 12, 1912	
	George DiLorenzo	March 24, 1919	
	Thomas Henry Doherty Jr.	August 8, 1930	
	John F. Dolan	September 7, 1922	
	John F. Donovan Jr.	August 21, 1931	
	James P. Downey	January 9, 1911	
	Charles E. Luke Driscoll	October 1, 1909	
	Wilfred C. Driscoll	December 31, 1926	
	Michael Dukakis	November 3, 1933	
	Richard J. Dwinell	August 5, 1917	
	Joseph D. Early	January 31, 1933	
	John Marshall Eaton Jr.	March 26, 1918	
	Arnold Irving Epstein	April 5, 1920	
	Thomas Francis Fallon	December 4, 1929	
	Manuel Faria	March 7, 1906	
	Vernon R. Farnsworth, Jr	April 18, 1934	
	Thomas F. Farrell	October 10, 1897	
	Michael Paul Feeney	March 26, 1907	
	William H. Finnegan	March 29, 1926	
	Irving Fishman	March 29, 1921	
	John Joseph Fitzgerald	February 28, 1918	
	Edward M. Flanagan	January 9, 1929	
	Charles L. Flannery	March 22, 1920	
	David Lawrence Flynn	February 5, 1933	
	Bernard J. Pat Foley	July 20, 1917	
	Jeremiah J. Foley	October 28, 1915	
	John Winslow Frenning	July 19, 1922	
	Albert A. Gammal Jr.	1928	
	Lester J. Gates		
	T. Harold Gayron	August 31, 1914	
	Julie Gilligan	August 5, 1911	
	Joel S. Greenberg	May 31, 1930	
	James L. Grimaldi	May 3, 1911	
	Anthony P. Grosso	October 19, 1913	
	Gerard A. Guilmette	October 22, 1911	
	Samuel Harmon	April 29, 1911	
	Michael J. Harrington	September 2, 1936	
	Edward D. Harrington Jr.	August 11, 1921	
	David E. Harrison	June 19, 1933	
	Francis W. Hatch Jr.	May 6, 1925	
	Michael E. Haynes	May 9, 1927	
	Winston Healy	October 20, 1937	
	Timothy William Hickey	February 14, 1938	
	William Francis Hogan	June 6, 1925	
	Franklin W. Holgate	May 3, 1929	
	Herbert B. Hollis	September 10, 1899	
	Marie Elizabeth Howe	June 13, 1939	
	Charles Iannello	April 25, 1906	
	John Peter Ivascyn	October 19, 1909	
	John Janas	September 4, 1910	
	Carl R. Johnson Jr.	August 22, 1926	
	Katherine Kane	April 12, 1935	
	Joseph M. Kearney	February 23, 1927	
	James H. Kelly	October 15, 1919	
	Gregory Benjamin Khachadoorian	July 8, 1928	
	Cornelius F. Kiernan	August 15, 1917	
	Philip Kimball	June 6, 1918	
	Edward P. Kirby	January 10, 1928	
	William I. Kitterman	July 19, 1928	
	Benjamin Klebanow	November 2, 1900	
	Freyda Koplow	October 26, 1907	
	Walter Kostanski	December 10, 1923	
	Mitsie T. Kulig	May 18, 1921	
	Matthew J. Kuss	December 5, 1915	
	Richard E. Landry	May 29, 1936	
	J. Louis Leblanc	January 6, 1940	
	Peter J. Levanti	March 19, 1903	
	David H. Locke	August 4, 1927	
	Alexander Lolas	July 9, 1932	
	Gerald P. Lombard	January 4, 1916	
	John J. Long	December 10, 1927	
	William Longworth	August 17, 1914	
	Joseph S. Loughman	January 11, 1928	
	William Q. MacLean Jr.	November 4, 1934	
	J. Robert Mahan	December 14, 1903	
	Paul F. Malloy	April 29, 1940	
	Theodore D. Mann	May 13, 1922	
	Donald J. Manning	June 23, 1929	
	Thomas W. McGee	May 24, 1924	
	Robert J. McGinn	December 18, 1918	
	John J. McGlynn	February 26, 1922	
	Allan McGuane	July 26, 1928	
	Arthur James McKenna	October 29, 1914	
	James Robert McMahon Jr.		
	John F. Melia	June 5, 1915	
	Paul C. Menton	April 15, 1925	
	William James Moran	June 24, 1921	
	Hugh J. Morgan Jr.	April 4, 1921	
	Gerald J. Morrissey	May 20, 1927	
	Edwin Herbert Morse	January 7, 1902	
	Charles A. Mullaly Jr.	September 28, 1910	
	James Gerard Mullen	May 5, 1922	
	Paul F. Murphy	October 14, 1932	
	Paul Maurice Murphy	February 24, 1932	
	Albert L. Nash	May 13, 1921	
	John J. Navin	September 9, 1915	
	Patrick William Nee	November 22, 1938	
	Mary B. Newman	February 15, 1909	2nd Middlesex
	Thomas M. Newth	March 15, 1911	
	James R. Nolen	April 17, 1933	
	Karl S. Nordin	September 10, 1906	
	James Anthony O'Brien, Jr	June 22, 1919	
	John Paul O'Brien	June 10, 1937	
	Walter Wilson O'Brien	October 14, 1910	
	David J. O'Connor	November 9, 1924	
	George Henry O'Farrell	November 15, 1910	
	Charles Ohanian	September 2, 1936	
	Domenick S. Pasciucco	August 1, 1921	
	Raymond S. Peck	December 10, 1922	
	Felix Perrault	October 27, 1915	
	Albert P. Pettoruto	September 29, 1915	
	George William Porter	November 6, 1885	
	Robert H. Quinn	January 30, 1928	
	Manuel Raposa, Jr.	May 13, 1915	
	Paul de Hoff Reed Jr.		
	Leo Joseph Reynolds	February 29, 1920	
	Frank G. Rico	June 2, 1912	
	Daniel H. Rider	July 15, 1912	
	William G. Robinson	March 10, 1926	
	J. Hilary Rockett	January 16, 1935	
	George Rogers (Massachusetts politician)	August 2, 1933	
	Maurice E. Ronayne, Jr	November 16, 1917	
	Harold Rosen (politician)	1906	
	Nathan Rosenfeld	January 31, 1906	
	Raymond F. Rourke	October 10, 1917	
	George Sacco	July 19, 1936	
	Roger A. Sala	August 8, 1893	
	Duane Thomas Sargisson		
	Joseph Douglas Saulnier	April 14, 1906	
	Anthony James Scalli	November 11, 1914	
	Frederic W. Schlosstein, Jr	March 17, 1923	
	Anthony M. Scibelli	October 16, 1911	
	John W. Sears	December 18, 1930	
	Jerome A. Segal	June 3, 1931	
	George W. Shattuck	July 17, 1916	
	Charles Louis Shea	June 28, 1927	
	Thomas A. Sheehan	March 21, 1933	
	Paul J. Sheehy	November 1, 1934	
	Aaron M. I. Shinberg		
	Alfred R. Shrigley	June 6, 1914	
	Andre Rives Sigourney	June 30, 1927	
	Michael John Simonelli	May 9, 1913	
	Ralph E. Sirianni Jr.	1923	
	Lawrence Philip Smith	December 4, 1919	
	George William Spartichino	June 11, 1924	
	George I. Spatcher	February 2, 1902	
	Janet Kirkland Starr	October 11, 1918	
	Chandler Harrison Stevens		
	Joseph A. Sylvia	August 19, 1892	
	A. Edward Talbot	January 24, 1915	
	Frank Daniel Tanner	February 3, 1888	
	John F. Thompson (politician)	May 20, 1920	
	David Spence Tobin	March 16, 1939	
	John Joseph Toomey	March 25, 1909	
	Joseph Thomas Travaline		
	Warren A. Turner	January 25, 1905	
	Elbert Tuttle	August 19, 1931	
	George E. Twomey	February 3, 1920	
	John Taylor Tynan	June 7, 1920	
	Dave Norman Vigneault	September 3, 1936	
	George B. Walsh	March 21, 1907	
	Joseph B. Walsh	November 15, 1923	
	Martin H. Walsh	July 31, 1916	
	Stephen Weekes	February 1, 1925	
	Norman S. Weinberg	1919	
	Robert D. Wetmore	July 24, 1930	
	James G. Wheeler		
	Arthur Williams	December 14, 1915	
	Thomas Casmere Wojtkowski	September 18, 1926	
	Edward S. Zelazo	May 27, 1924	
	Samuel Zoll	June 20, 1934	

== See also ==
- 89th United States Congress
- List of Massachusetts General Courts
