= 1959–1960 Massachusetts legislature =

161st Massachusetts General Court
| ← | 160th | 162nd | → |

Overview
- Legislative body: General Court
- Term: January 7, 1959 – November 24, 1960

Senate
- Members: 40
- President: John E. Powers
- Party control: Democrat

House
- Members: 240
- Speaker: John F. Thompson
- Party control: Democrat

John Powers, Senate president.

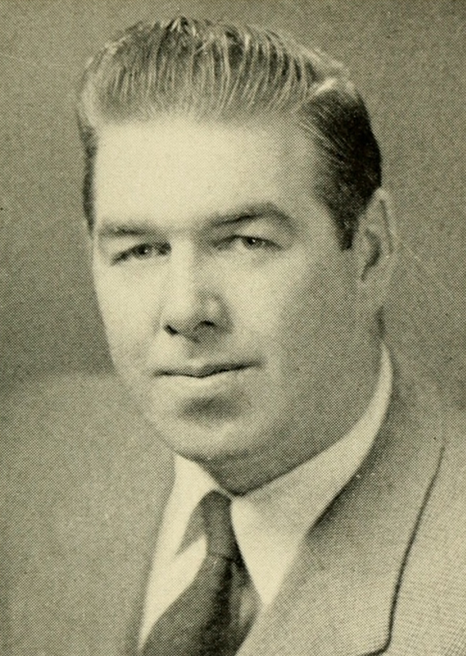
John Thompson, House speaker.

Leaders of the Massachusetts General Court, 1959-1960.

The 161st Massachusetts General Court, consisting of the Massachusetts Senate and the Massachusetts House of Representatives, met in 1959 and 1960 during the governorship of Foster Furcolo. John E. Powers served as president of the Senate and John F. Thompson served as speaker of the House.

== Senators ==
| portrait | name | date of birth | district |
|---|---|---|---|
| | John Joseph Beades | June 8, 1916 | 7th Suffolk |
| | Paul H. Benoit | January 5, 1916 | |
| | Otto F. Burkhardt | January 17, 1902 | |
| | Harold Wilson Canavan | May 13, 1915 | |
| | Richard Caples | December 23, 1921 | |
| | James J. Corbett | November 27, 1896 | |
| | Robert P. Cramer | October 22, 1916 | |
| | Leslie Bradley Cutler | March 24, 1890 | |
| | Maurice A. Donahue | September 12, 1918 | |
| | C. Eugene Farnam | December 31, 1916 | |
| | William Daniel Fleming | April 14, 1907 | |
| | Mary L. Fonseca | March 30, 1915 | |
| | A. Frank Foster | February 8, 1910 | |
| | Donald Linwood Gibbs | August 7, 1904 | |
| | Joseph Francis Gibney | January 9, 1911 | |
| | Philip A. Graham | May 21, 1910 | |
| | Kevin B. Harrington | January 9, 1929 | |
| | William E. Hays | November 28, 1903 | |
| | Charles W. Hedges | March 27, 1901 | |
| | James W. Hennigan Jr. | March 27, 1927 | |
| | Charles V. Hogan | April 12, 1897 | |
| | Newland H. Holmes | August 30, 1891 | |
| | Warren Sherman Keith | June 12, 1892 | |
| | Fred I. Lamson | December 11, 1910 | |
| | Francis L. Lappin | January 13, 1915 | |
| | Michael LoPresti | June 25, 1908 | |
| | Harold R. Lundgren | May 22, 1894 | |
| | William Charles Madden | July 9, 1915 | |
| | Ralph Collins Mahar | January 4, 1912 | |
| | Francis X. McCann | September 2, 1912 | |
| | Peter M. McCormack | April 22, 1919 | |
| | Arthur Joseph Mullen | July 20, 1922 | |
| | Charles William Olson | August 24, 1889 | |
| | John Francis Parker | May 29, 1907 | |
| | John E. Powers | November 10, 1910 | |
| | James Paul Rurak | November 9, 1911 | |
| | Elizabeth Stanton | May 27, 1909 | |
| | Edward C. Stone | June 29, 1878 | |
| | William X. Wall | July 1, 1904 | |
| | Stanley John Zarod | April 11, 1920 | |

== Representatives ==
| portrait | name | date of birth | district |
|---|---|---|---|
| | Harry Benjamin Albro | January 21, 1887 | 2nd Barnstable |
| | Walter T. Anderson | January 6, 1891 | |
| | Julius Ansel | April 27, 1908 | |
| | John A. Armstrong | June 12, 1901 | |
| | John George Asiaf | June 30, 1900 | |
| | John Robert Ayers | February 18, 1911 | |
| | Fred A. Baumeister | September 24, 1892 | |
| | Raymond H. Beach | August 11, 1888 | |
| | Roger L. Bernashe | September 9, 1927 | |
| | Francis Bevilacqua | August 12, 1923 | |
| | Charles A. Bisbee Jr. | June 8, 1918 | |
| | Vinson Blanchard | August 1, 1916 | |
| | Carlton H. Bliss | August 7, 1900 | |
| | Belden Bly | September 29, 1914 | |
| | Stanley Joseph Bocko | August 26, 1920 | |
| | Robert Joseph Bohigian | July 24, 1922 | |
| | Frank Edwin Boot | November 8, 1905 | |
| | Gordon Dickson Boynton | August 9, 1901 | |
| | Malcolm Blanchard Boynton | November 13, 1894 | |
| | G. Edward Bradley | October 21, 1906 | |
| | John Cornelius Bresnahan | November 14, 1919 | |
| | Joseph E. Brett | May 19, 1907 | |
| | Lawrence F. Bretta | January 12, 1928 | |
| | John D. Brown | January 30, 1900 | |
| | John Brox | November 16, 1910 | |
| | John Patrick Buckley | 1906 | |
| | Thaddeus M. Buczko | February 23, 1926 | |
| | George H. Burgeson | December 25, 1907 | |
| | Anthony Joseph Burke | July 17, 1931 | |
| | Walter T. Burke | August 5, 1911 | |
| | Gardner E. Campbell | November 22, 1886 | |
| | John J. Campbell | August 26, 1922 | |
| | Michael Herbert Cantwell | May 2, 1905 | |
| | Charles W. Capraro | November 2, 1920 | |
| | Michael Joseph Carroll | June 21, 1891 | |
| | Ralph W. Cartwright Jr. | October 5, 1920 | |
| | William J. Casey (Massachusetts politician) | June 27, 1905 | |
| | Michael Catino | February 21, 1904 | |
| | John Joseph Cavanaugh | December 16, 1921 | |
| | Alexander J. Cella | March 1, 1929 | |
| | Harrison Chadwick | February 25, 1903 | |
| | Amelio Della Chiesa | July 31, 1901 | |
| | Stephen T. Chmura | August 25, 1916 | |
| | Peter Joseph Cloherty | February 19, 1923 | |
| | Thomas Francis Coady Jr. | May 8, 1905 | |
| | Anthony M. Colonna | May 2, 1916 | |
| | James Francis Condon | February 4, 1899 | |
| | Lloyd E. Conn | November 26, 1904 | |
| | Gilbert M. Coroa | January 13, 1925 | |
| | John W. Costello | April 20, 1927 | |
| | Leo Joseph Cournoyer | December 11, 1905 | |
| | Russell H. Craig | February 4, 1924 | |
| | Robert Q. Crane | March 21, 1926 | |
| | James J. Craven, Jr. | March 24, 1919 | |
| | Wallace Boyd Crawford | November 19, 1908 | |
| | John J. Cronin | August 1, 1910 | |
| | Sidney Curtiss | September 4, 1917 | |
| | John A. Davis | May 9, 1912 | |
| | John Davoren | July 27, 1915 | |
| | James DeNormandie | November 10, 1907 | |
| | Domenic Victor DePari | October 27, 1910 | |
| | Wilfred Adolphus Derosier | March 2, 1908 | |
| | Cornelius Desmond | October 4, 1893 | |
| | Theophile Jean DesRoches | June 27, 1902 | |
| | Gerard F. Doherty | April 6, 1928 | |
| | John F. Dolan | September 7, 1922 | |
| | Richard T. Dolan | January 4, 1924 | |
| | Edmond J. Donlan | December 19, 1899 | |
| | Henry C. Donnelly | April 13, 1922 | |
| | Thomas Francis Donohue | December 6, 1902 | |
| | Harold Lawrence Dower | September 16, 1908 | |
| | Charles Robert Doyle | September 24, 1925 | |
| | John T. Driscoll | October 26, 1925 | |
| | Charles E. Luke Driscoll | October 1, 1909 | |
| | James V. Duffy | March 14, 1920 | |
| | John Marshall Eaton Jr. | March 26, 1918 | |
| | Thomas Edward Enright | August 1, 1881 | |
| | Thomas Francis Fallon | December 4, 1929 | |
| | Manuel Faria | March 7, 1906 | |
| | Thomas F. Farrell | October 10, 1897 | |
| | Michael Paul Feeney | March 26, 1907 | |
| | Lawrence F. Feloney | September 11, 1921 | |
| | A. Richard Ferullo | December 29, 1929 | |
| | Cornelius T. Finnegan Jr. | December 13, 1918 | |
| | William H. Finnegan | March 29, 1926 | |
| | Thomas M. Flaherty | September 6, 1903 | |
| | Vernon R. Fletcher | February 8, 1924 | |
| | Maurice Richard Flynn Jr. | December 20, 1917 | |
| | Jeremiah J. Foley | October 28, 1915 | |
| | John Winslow Frenning | July 19, 1922 | |
| | Joseph Garczynski, Jr | February 14, 1927 | |
| | Frank S. Giles | June 15, 1915 | |
| | Louis Harry Glaser | June 15, 1910 | |
| | Edwin Daniel Gorman | November 19, 1912 | |
| | Thomas T. Gray | July 22, 1892 | |
| | George Greene | March 7, 1897 | |
| | Henry W. Hallinan | February 1, 1915 | |
| | David Boyce Hamilton | December 4, 1890 | |
| | Samuel Harmon | April 29, 1911 | |
| | Edward D. Harrington Jr. | August 11, 1921 | |
| | Russell Palmer Hayden | February 14, 1915 | |
| | Arthur Graham Heaney | July 7, 1908 | |
| | William John Hill | October 4, 1930 | |
| | Herbert B. Hollis | September 10, 1899 | |
| | Charles F. Holman | June 21, 1892 | |
| | J. Philip Howard | February 16, 1907 | |
| | Richard Lester Hull | November 30, 1917 | |
| | Walter Forbes Hurlburt | February 18, 1917 | |
| | Charles Iannello | April 25, 1906 | |
| | John Peter Ivascyn | October 19, 1909 | |
| | Carl R. Johnson Jr. | August 22, 1926 | |
| | Ernest A. Johnson | March 13, 1897 | |
| | Allan Francis Jones | June 29, 1921 | |
| | Oswald Louis Jordan | May 9, 1912 | |
| | William F. Joyce | July 26, 1909 | |
| | Sumner Z. Kaplan | February 3, 1920 | |
| | William Francis Keenan | January 8, 1921 | |
| | James A. Kelly Jr. | May 11, 1926 | |
| | James H. Kelly | October 15, 1919 | |
| | Archibald E. Kenefick | November 4, 1896 | |
| | George V. Kenneally Jr. | December 29, 1929 | |
| | John P. Kennedy | February 24, 1918 | |
| | Edward L. Kerr | March 6, 1909 | |
| | Gregory Benjamin Khachadoorian | July 8, 1928 | |
| | Cornelius F. Kiernan | August 15, 1917 | |
| | Philip Kimball | June 6, 1918 | |
| | William James Kingston | October 17, 1909 | |
| | Thomas Edward Kitchen | December 16, 1924 | |
| | Freyda Koplow | October 26, 1907 | |
| | Walter Kostanski | December 10, 1923 | |
| | Matthew J. Kuss | December 5, 1915 | |
| | John Joseph Lawless | July 15, 1912 | |
| | James R. Lawton | October 20, 1925 | |
| | Frank F. Lemos | January 6, 1901 | |
| | Peter J. Levanti | March 19, 1903 | |
| | Emmit Joseph Line | June 17, 1927 | |
| | John Joseph Linehan | March 26, 1933 | |
| | Gerald P. Lombard | January 4, 1916 | |
| | John J. Long | December 10, 1927 | |
| | William Longworth | August 17, 1914 | |
| | John Donald Bain Macmillan | July 14, 1917 | |
| | J. Robert Mahan | December 14, 1903 | |
| | Francis Joseph Marr | October 10, 1927 | |
| | Rico Matera | June 21, 1917 | |
| | Joseph F. McEvoy Jr. | April 27, 1918 | |
| | John J. McGlynn | February 26, 1922 | |
| | James McIntyre (politician) | May 25, 1930 | |
| | Manuel Victor Medeiros | March 15, 1908 | |
| | Paul C. Menton | April 15, 1925 | |
| | Joe Moakley | April 27, 1927 | |
| | Robert Francis Mooney | February 16, 1931 | |
| | William James Moran | June 24, 1921 | |
| | Edward S. Morrow | March 20, 1921 | |
| | William Dix Morton Jr. | November 5, 1904 | |
| | Charles A. Mullaly Jr. | September 28, 1910 | |
| | James Gerard Mullen | May 5, 1922 | |
| | Robert John Mulligan | March 29, 1931 | |
| | Cornelius Joseph Murray | August 19, 1890 | |
| | Harold Clinton Nagle | July 27, 1917 | |
| | John J. Navin | September 9, 1915 | |
| | Michael Anthony Nazzaro Jr. | June 2, 1925 | |
| | Mary B. Newman | February 15, 1909 | 2nd Middlesex |
| | Thomas M. Newth | March 15, 1911 | |
| | James R. Nolen | April 17, 1933 | |
| | Leo James Normandin | December 14, 1922 | |
| | William F. Nourse | September 12, 1922 | |
| | Walter Wilson O'Brien | October 14, 1910 | |
| | David J. O'Connor | November 9, 1924 | |
| | George Henry O'Farrell | November 15, 1910 | |
| | Joseph Michael O'Loughlin | November 26, 1914 | |
| | George J. O'Shea Jr. | January 5, 1929 | |
| | Daniel Matthew O'Sullivan | August 17, 1921 | |
| | William F. Otis | October 12, 1903 | |
| | Charles Louis Patrone | March 17, 1914 | |
| | Theodore Clark Perkins | January 7, 1915 | |
| | Francis W. Perry | April 21, 1913 | |
| | Vite Pigaga | | |
| | Lincoln Pope Jr. | May 29, 1916 | |
| | Michael A. Porrazzo | June 2, 1913 | |
| | George William Porter | November 6, 1885 | |
| | Meyer Pressman | February 11, 1907 | |
| | Stuart D. Putnam | February 2, 1906 | |
| | Robert H. Quinn | January 30, 1928 | |
| | Philip Andrew Quinn | February 21, 1910 | |
| | William I. Randall | September 13, 1915 | |
| | George E. Rawson | December 6, 1886 | |
| | Leo Joseph Reynolds | February 29, 1920 | |
| | Frank G. Rico | June 2, 1912 | |
| | Daniel H. Rider | July 15, 1912 | |
| | Harold Rosen (politician) | 1906 | |
| | Nathan Rosenfeld | January 31, 1906 | |
| | Raymond F. Rourke | October 10, 1917 | |
| | Harry Della Russo | May 26, 1907 | |
| | Roger A. Sala | August 8, 1893 | |
| | Joseph Douglas Saulnier | April 14, 1906 | |
| | Anthony M. Scibelli | October 16, 1911 | |
| | John Ralph Sennott Jr. | April 22, 1910 | |
| | Vincent Joseph Shanley | January 27, 1916 | |
| | Charles Louis Shea | June 28, 1927 | |
| | Antone L. Silva | | |
| | Joseph Silvano | March 1, 1909 | |
| | Michael John Simonelli | May 9, 1913 | |
| | Fletcher Smith Jr. | May 20, 1918 | |
| | Lawrence Philip Smith | December 4, 1919 | |
| | George William Spartichino | June 11, 1924 | |
| | George I. Spatcher | February 2, 1902 | |
| | Edmund R. St. John Jr. | April 28, 1920 | |
| | C. Clifford Stone | August 20, 1897 | |
| | William Christopher Sullivan | October 13, 1924 | |
| | John A. Sweeney | October 22, 1926 | |
| | Joseph A. Sylvia | August 19, 1892 | |
| | Alvin C. Tamkin | June 19, 1924 | |
| | Armand N. Tancrati | May 3, 1914 | |
| | Frank Daniel Tanner | February 3, 1888 | |
| | Edna Telford | February 28, 1899 | |
| | John F. Thompson (politician) | May 20, 1920 | |
| | George Hawley Thompson | June 8, 1917 | |
| | George Breed Thomson | January 10, 1921 | |
| | Irene Thresher | July 6, 1900 | |
| | J. Robert Tickle | February 27, 1918 | |
| | John Joseph Toomey | March 25, 1909 | |
| | Henry Andrews Turner | March 22, 1887 | |
| | Warren A. Turner | January 25, 1905 | |
| | John Taylor Tynan | June 7, 1920 | |
| | Theodore Jack Vaitses | May 8, 1901 | |
| | Alfred R. Voke | February 12, 1919 | |
| | Joseph Francis Walsh | February 9, 1907 | |
| | Martin H. Walsh | July 31, 1916 | |
| | Barclay H. Warburton III | February 5, 1922 | |
| | Chester H. Waterous | November 18, 1905 | |
| | Norman S. Weinberg | 1919 | |
| | Benjamin Horace White | April 11, 1902 | |
| | Philip F. Whitmore | September 10, 1892 | |
| | John W. Whittemore | January 30, 1906 | |
| | Clarence Wilkinson | September 26, 1910 | |
| | Arthur Williams | December 14, 1915 | |
| | Thomas Casmere Wojtkowski | September 18, 1926 | |
| | Alton Hamilton Worrall | April 20, 1893 | |
| | Albert H. Zabriskie | December 7, 1917 | |
| | Paul G. Zollo | August 26, 1904 | |

== See also ==
- 86th United States Congress
- List of Massachusetts General Courts
