= William Bulger =

American politician, lawyer and educator (born 1934)

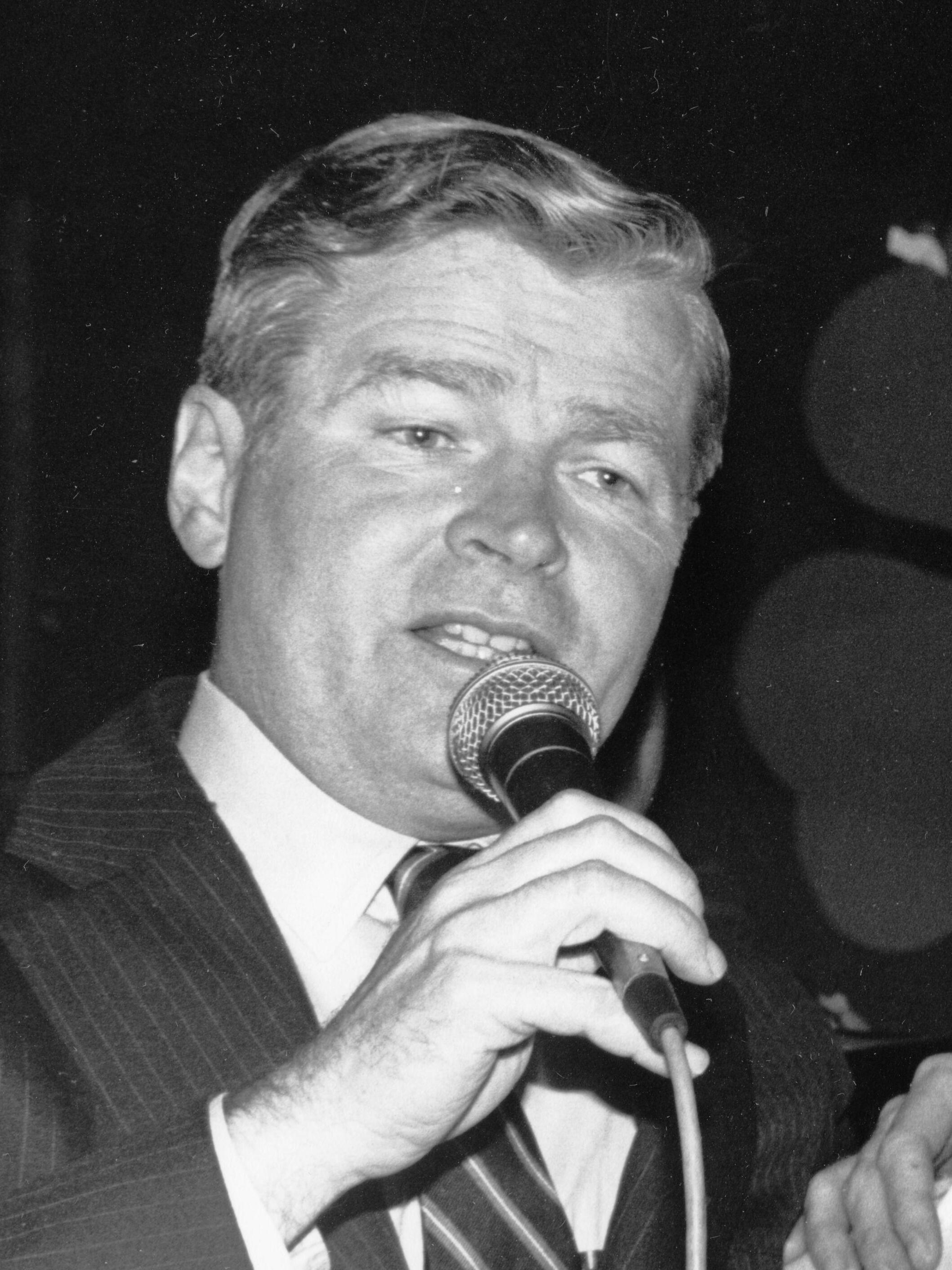
- Bulger c. 1984–1987

President of the University of Massachusetts
- In office January 4, 1996 – September 1, 2003
- Appointed by: Bill Weld
- Preceded by: Shirley Penney
- Succeeded by: Jack M. Wilson

President of the Massachusetts Senate
- In office January 6, 1978 – January 3, 1996
- Preceded by: Kevin B. Harrington
- Succeeded by: Tom Birmingham

Member of the Massachusetts Senate from the 1st Suffolk district
- In office January 6, 1971 – January 3, 1996
- Preceded by: Joe Moakley
- Succeeded by: Stephen Lynch

Member of the Massachusetts House of Representatives from Suffolk County
- In office January 4, 1961 – January 6, 1971
- Preceded by: Joe Moakley
- Succeeded by: Raymond Flynn
- Constituency: 7th Suffolk district (1961–1965); 5th Suffolk district (1965–1969); 6th Suffolk district (1969–1971)

Personal details
- Born: William Michael Bulger; February 2, 1934 (age 92) Dorchester, Massachusetts, U.S.
- Party: Democratic
- Spouse: Mary Foley (m. 1960; died 2020)
- Relations: Whitey Bulger (brother)
- Children: 9
- Education: Boston College (BA, JD)
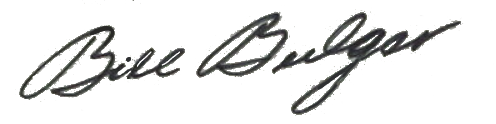
- Signature
- Nickname: Billy

Military service
- Branch/service: United States Army
- Years of service: 1953–1955

William Michael Bulger (born February 2, 1934) is an American former Democratic politician, lawyer, and educator from South Boston, Massachusetts. His eighteen-year tenure as President of the Massachusetts Senate is the longest in history. After leaving office, he became president of the University of Massachusetts.

Bulger came from Old Harbor Village Housing Development (now more commonly known as the Mary Ellen McCormick Housing Development). He graduated from Boston College High School in 1952, then from Boston College in Classics, then from Boston College Law School.

Bulger was the younger brother of the convicted mob boss James "Whitey" Bulger, who led the Winter Hill Gang, and he received harsh criticism for refusing to distance himself from his brother, who was convicted of participating in 11 murders and sentenced to life in prison, or to cooperate with authorities after he became a fugitive. He was forced to resign from the presidency of the University of Massachusetts. Bulger went on to teach as a visiting scholar at Suffolk University, but has since removed himself from public life.

== Early life ==
William Bulger's father, James Joseph Bulger Sr., was from Harbour Grace, Newfoundland. After settling in Everett, Massachusetts, James Sr. married Jane Veronica "Jean" McCarthy, a first-generation Irish immigrant. William Bulger was born in Dorchester, Massachusetts, and is the third of six children in the family, and younger brother of former mob boss James Joseph "Whitey" Bulger Jr. (1929–2018).

Bulger's father worked as a union laborer and occasional longshoreman; he lost his arm in an industrial accident and the family was reduced to poverty. In May 1938, when Bulger was four years old, the family moved to South Boston's Old Harbor Village housing project, soon after it opened. He grew up there and has maintained lifelong friendships with many of those who were his former neighbors, including best friend, Korean War Marine P.O.W. and Purple Heart recipient Fred L. Toomey. The late Congressman Joe Moakley (1927–2001) was also a close childhood neighbor. Although the Bulger family was poor, William matriculated into Boston College High School. He enrolled at Boston College in 1952, but his undergraduate career was interrupted when he joined the United States Army. He served from September 1953 to November 1955, then returned to Boston College, completing his undergraduate degree in English Literature with the help of the G.I. Bill. He attended Boston College Law School, from which he received his Doctor of Jurisprudence degree in 1961. He is also the recipient of over 20 honorary degrees from a variety of academic institutions.

== Political career ==
Bulger became interested in politics in 1959 and was first elected to the Massachusetts House of Representatives as a Democrat in 1960. After serving five terms, Bulger was elected to the Massachusetts State Senate in 1970 representing the First Suffolk District. In 1973, he was named Second Assistant Floor Majority Leader. After Joseph DiCarlo's conviction for extortion in 1977, Bulger succeeded him as Senate Majority Leader. Bulger was elected President of the Massachusetts State Senate in 1978 and was re-elected every two years through 1996, making his time as State Senate president the longest tenure in Massachusetts history.

Like other Massachusetts politicians who were elected leaders of their legislative chambers, Bulger was frequently pilloried in the media, but remained very popular in his district. He won his district election every two years from 1961 to 1994 without ever facing a serious challenger other than in the Democratic primary in 1988, when Stephen Holt, a neophyte liberal activist and bookstore owner from Dorchester, won 31 out of 60 precincts, only to lose by a landslide due to the huge turnout of Bulger supporters in South Boston.

Bulger appeared in Primary Motive as Senator William Bulger.

For many years, Bulger hosted the annual St. Patrick's Day Breakfast in South Boston; it is a "roast" of politicians.

=== Political milestones ===
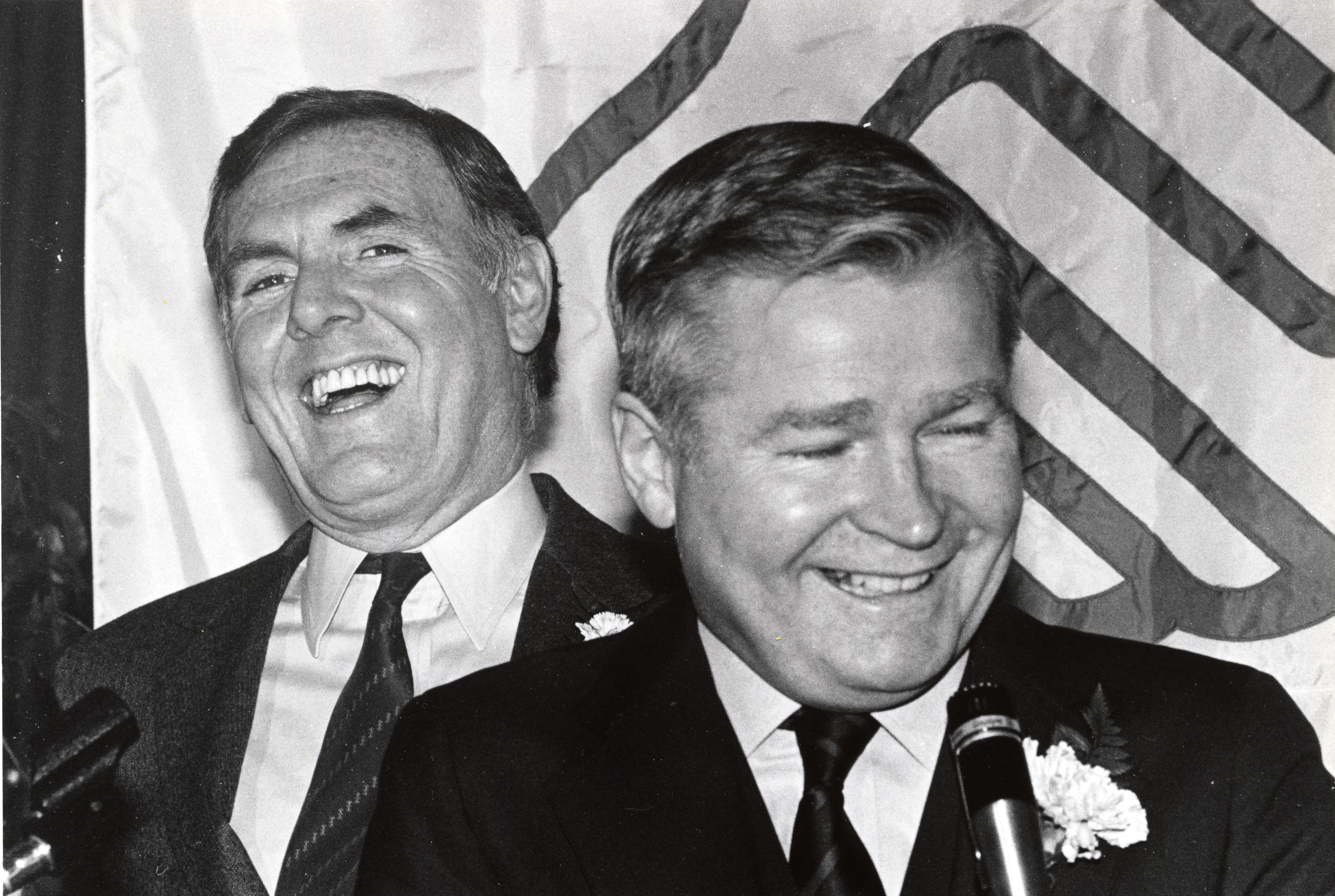
Bulger (right), with Boston Mayor Raymond Flynn (left), in the 1980s

Bulger was a leading opponent of the desegregation of Boston schools achieved through busing. During one protest, he called the police who were arresting protestors against desegregation "the Gestapo".

During the 1960s, Bulger led efforts to write the first child abuse reporting laws in the state. He was supportive of environmental protection legislation.

Bulger was among the first advocates of charter schools and public school choice. During the 1980s, he advocated funding of public libraries, the expansion of childhood nutrition services and fuel assistance programs. As Senate president, Bulger led the debate on welfare reform in the early 1990s, with the resulting legislation becoming the model for a national law.

== President of the University of Massachusetts system ==
Bulger was appointed president of the University of Massachusetts by the board of trustees on November 28, 1995. His candidacy for the UMass position was supported by Governor William Weld. The appointment was controversial in academic circles, as Bulger had no prior experience in higher education, and lacked the academic doctoral degree usually required for the presidency of a major state university system.

On August 6, 2003, Bulger announced that he would resign as president of the system effective September 1, 2003. His resignation came due to pressure from Governor Mitt Romney after Bulger had refused to cooperate with authorities who were searching for Bulger's brother, the notorious mobster James "Whitey" Bulger.

== Extortion investigation ==
In 1989, a close associate of Bulger, Thomas Finnerty, was accused of extorting $500,000 from a real estate developer, Harold Brown. Bulger received $240,000 of the payment. Both men maintained that it was a loan from Brown. After an investigation by U.S. Attorney Jeremiah O'Sullivan, no charges against Bulger were pressed. However, it has been asserted by reporter Dick Lehr and Harvard law professor Alan Dershowitz that O’Sullivan may have had a Conflict of interest regarding his decision not to prosecute Bulger since he was aware that his brother Whitey Bulger was an FBI informant and was supportive of Bulger's efforts which helped O’Sullivan prosecute the mafia.

== Whitey Bulger controversy ==
Bulger's older brother James "Whitey" Bulger Jr., was a convicted crime boss and multiple murderer and the former boss of the Winter Hill Gang. Whitey was a fugitive from 1995 until his arrest in June 2011. William Bulger lived next door to a house owned by one of his brother's associates, "where the gang hatched plots, stored an arsenal of weapons and even committed murder."

In 1999, Whitey's longtime aide, Kevin Weeks, pleaded guilty to a number of charges related to Whitey's crime spree and became a cooperating witness. Weeks revealed that in 1995, William talked to Whitey during an arranged phone conversation just two weeks after Whitey fled a pending racketeering indictment. When William testified before a grand jury in 2001, a federal prosecutor pressed him without success for information on his brother:

So just to be clear, you felt more loyalty to your brother than you did to the people of the Commonwealth of Massachusetts? I never thought about it that way, Bulger replied. But I do have an honest loyalty to my brother, and I care about him (…) It’s my hope that I'm never helpful to anyone against him (…) I don't have an obligation to help everyone catch him.

When asked why he didn't urge Whitey to turn himself in, William replied that he didn't feel it was in his brother's best interest to give himself up at the time.

After invoking the Fifth Amendment when called to testify in 2002 before a Congressional committee investigating his brother's corrupt relationship with the FBI, he testified in June 2003, after being granted immunity from prosecution for obstruction of justice. Bulger claimed that he did not know that his brother was involved in murder or with narcotics and even denied that he’d ever heard of the Winter Hill Gang. According to a book about Whitey Bulger quoted by The New York Times: "Asked if he wanted Whitey to give himself up, 'the normally loquacious Bulger sat for several moments, unable to speak."

At the hearing, Bulger revealed that he went to an arranged location in 1995 to take a call from his fugitive brother, apparently to avoid electronic eavesdropping. He claimed that not notifying authorities about the call was "in no way inconsistent with my devotion to my own responsibilities, my public responsibilities" as state senate president. Asked what he thought his brother did for a living, William Bulger said:

I had the feeling that he was in the business of gaming and ... whatever. It was vague to me but I didn't think, for a long while he had some jobs but ultimately it was clear that he was not being, you know, he wasn't doing what I'd like him to do.

He added that he loved his brother and hoped that the most brutal rumors concerning him would be proven false.

Bulger came under harsh criticism for evasiveness, and Governor Mitt Romney, among others, demanded his resignation as president of the University of Massachusetts. Under pressure from all quarters, Bulger resigned in the fall of 2003.

Bulger also testified that the FBI never asked if he knew of Whitey's location. Those remarks were disputed by a former FBI agent who claimed Bulger declined to submit to an interview with the FBI. Months later, the committee report found Bulger's testimony "inconsistent" about whether the FBI had contacted him in the search for his fugitive brother.

Upon Whitey's arrest in California in June 2011, William Bulger issued a statement expressing his "sympathies to the families hurt" in the case, and asking for privacy for his family.

The New York Times reported in 2013, after Whitey Bulger was convicted of murder, that William Bulger's attitude toward his brother led to unfavorable comparisons with the brother of the Unabomber, who provided authorities with information leading to the apprehension of Ted Kaczynski, who subsequently was convicted in the bombings. The Times concluded that "by contrast, it is hard to imagine what, if anything, would ever make Mr. Bulger turn on his brother."

== Active retirement and family ==
Bulger is a past president of the Boston Public Library and past member of the board of trustees. He is also overseer emeritus of the Boston Symphony Orchestra. In addition, he is a former member of the Massachusetts General Hospital board of trustees, Museum of Fine Arts board of trustees, and McLean Hospital board of trustees. He joined the faculties of Boston College and Suffolk University as a lecturer of political science in 2004. Bulger lived in South Boston with Mary Foley (1935–2020), his wife whom he married in 1960 until her death on June 7, 2020. Bulger and his wife have nine children and 33 grandchildren. According to the Massachusetts Open Checkbook list of state pensions, Bulger's pension from Massachusetts for his position as University of Massachusetts president ranged from $198,926 to $201,266 for the years 2011 to 2019.

== See also ==
- Massachusetts House of Representatives' 5th Suffolk district
- 1961–1962 Massachusetts legislature
- 1963–1964 Massachusetts legislature
- 1965–1966 Massachusetts legislature
- 1967–1968 Massachusetts legislature
- 1969–1970 Massachusetts legislature
- 1971–1972 Massachusetts legislature
- 1973–1974 Massachusetts legislature
- 1975–1976 Massachusetts legislature
- 1977–1978 Massachusetts legislature
- 1979–1980 Massachusetts legislature
- 1981–1982 Massachusetts legislature
- 1983–1984 Massachusetts legislature
- 1985–1986 Massachusetts legislature
- 1987–1988 Massachusetts legislature
- 1989–1990 Massachusetts legislature
- 1991–1992 Massachusetts legislature
- 1993–1994 Massachusetts legislature
- 1995–1996 Massachusetts legislature

== Biographical works ==
- Bulger, William M. While the Music Lasts: My Life in Politics. New York: Houghton Mifflin, 1996. ISBN 0-395-72041-9.
- Bulger, William M. James Michael Curley: A Short Biography with Personal Reminiscences by William M. Bulger. Beverly, Massachusetts: Commonwealth Editions, 2009. ISBN 978-1-933212-97-5.
- Burke, John J. A Profile in Political Power, a 2010 documentary produced by JAMAR Productions, highlights the political career of William M. Bulger.

Political offices
Preceded by Joseph DiCarlo	Majority Leader of the Massachusetts Senate; 1977–1978	Succeeded by Daniel J. Foley
Preceded by Kevin Harrington	President of the Massachusetts Senate; 1978–1996	Succeeded by Thomas Birmingham
Academic offices
Preceded by Sherry H. Penney	President of the University of Massachusetts; 1996–2003	Succeeded by Jack M. Wilson
