= Robert H. Quinn =

American attorney and politician (1928–2014)

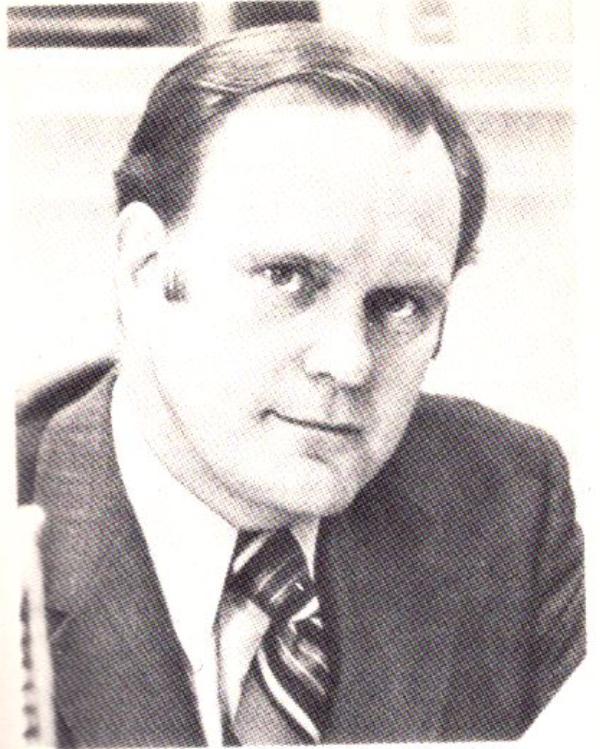
- Quinn, c. 1973

38th Attorney General of the Commonwealth of Massachusetts
- In office 1969–1975
- Governor: Francis Sargent
- Preceded by: Elliot Richardson
- Succeeded by: Francis Bellotti

Speaker of the Massachusetts House of Representatives
- In office 1967–1969
- Preceded by: John Davoren
- Succeeded by: David M. Bartley

Majority Leader of the Massachusetts House of Representatives
- In office 1964–1967
- Preceded by: John Davoren
- Succeeded by: David M. Bartley

Member of the Massachusetts House of Representatives
- In office 1957–1969
- Preceded by: Thomas J. Hannon
- Succeeded by: James F. Hart

Personal details
- Born: January 30, 1928 Boston, Massachusetts, U.S.
- Died: January 12, 2014 (aged 85) Falmouth, Massachusetts, U.S.
- Party: Democratic
- Education: Boston College; Harvard Law School
- Occupation: Attorney; Politician

Robert Henry Quinn (January 30, 1928 – January 12, 2014) was an American attorney and politician in the state of Massachusetts.

== Early life ==
Quinn was born January 30, 1928, in Boston, Massachusetts. He was the youngest of seven children. When Quinn was six his father died.

Quinn received a scholarship to Boston College High School and attended Boston College on a football scholarship. While at BC, he was stricken with tuberculosis and it was believed that he would die. Quinn recovered after spending three years in the hospital. He went on to finish college and graduated from Harvard Law School in 1955.

== Political career ==
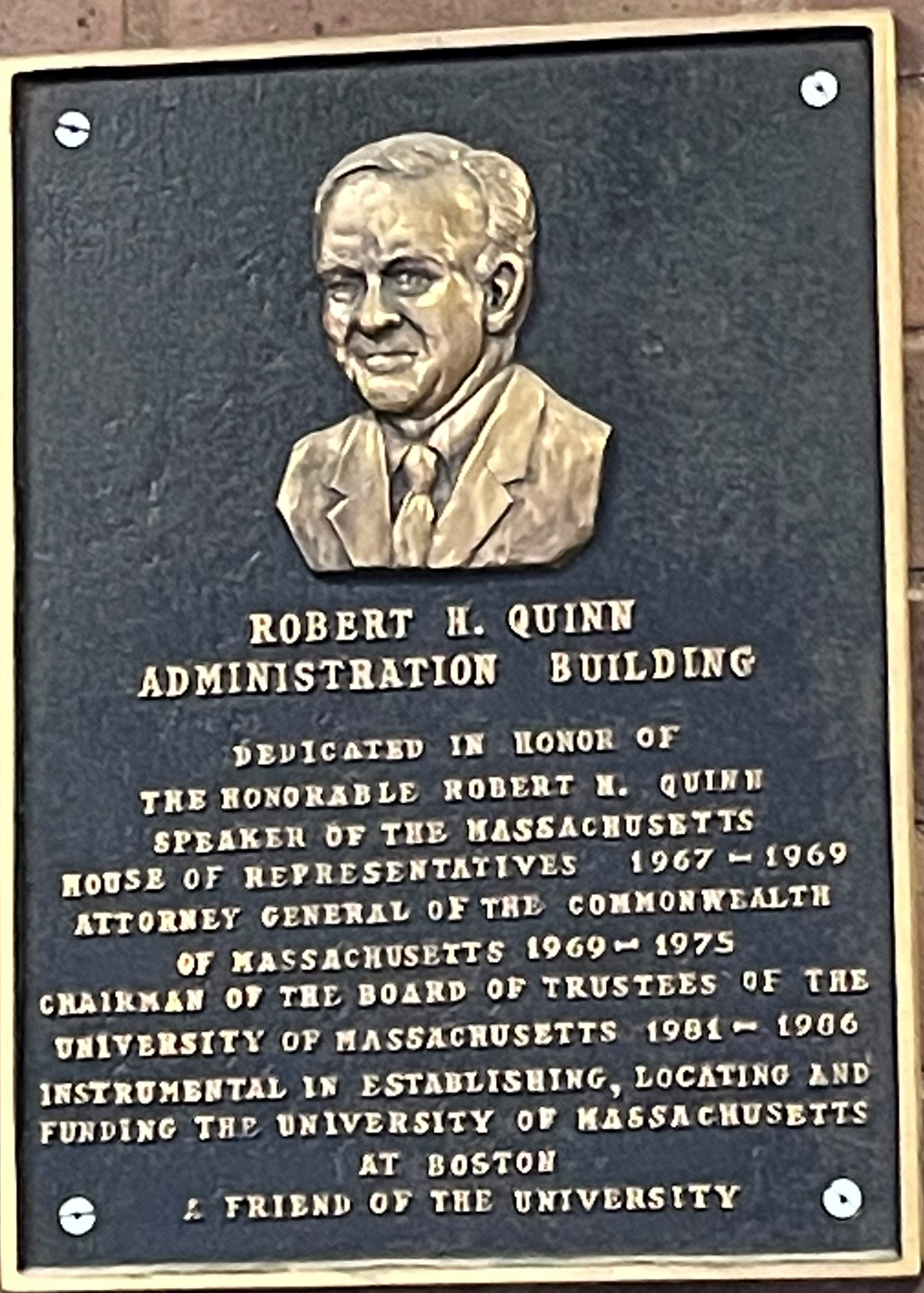
Plaque commemorating Robert H. Quinn at the University of Massachusetts Boston

Quinn was a member of the Massachusetts House of Representatives from 1957 to 1969 and the speaker of that body from 1967 to 1969. During his tenure in the house, he played a role in the founding of the University of Massachusetts Boston by co-sponsoring the legislation that established the university in conjunction with Massachusetts Senate Majority Leader Maurice A. Donahue.

Quinn was elected Massachusetts Attorney General by the Massachusetts Legislature sitting in Joint Convention following Elliot Richardson's selection as Under Secretary of State. He won a full four-year term in 1970. In 1970, Quinn championed legislation that offered financial incentives to law enforcement officers who pursued higher education, which became known as the "Quinn Bill".

Quinn sought the Democratic nomination for governor in 1974, but was defeated by Michael Dukakis.

== Later life and death ==
Following his defeat, co-founded the Quinn and Morris law firm and was a prominent lobbyist. He also served as chairman of the board of trustees of University of Massachusetts (1981–1986) and the Massachusetts Convention Center Authority.

Quinn died in Falmouth, Massachusetts, on January 12, 2014, at the age of 85.

== See also ==
- Massachusetts House of Representatives' 9th Suffolk district
- 1957–1958 Massachusetts legislature
- 1959–1960 Massachusetts legislature
- 1961–1962 Massachusetts legislature
- 1963–1964 Massachusetts legislature
- 1965–1966 Massachusetts legislature
- 1967–1968 Massachusetts legislature

Party political offices
Preceded by Francis Bellotti	Democratic nominee for Attorney General of Massachusetts; 1970	Succeeded by Francis Bellotti
Massachusetts House of Representatives
Preceded by John Davoren	Speaker of the Massachusetts House of Representatives; 1969 – 1975	Succeeded by David M. Bartley
Legal offices
Preceded by Elliot Richardson	Attorney General of Massachusetts; 1969 – 1975	Succeeded by Francis X. Bellotti
