= John E. Powers =

American politician

- Powers, circa 1963

President of the Massachusetts Senate
- In office 1959–1964
- Preceded by: Newland H. Holmes
- Succeeded by: Maurice A. Donahue

Minority Leader of the Massachusetts Senate
- In office 1950–1959
- Preceded by: Chester A. Dolan Jr.
- Succeeded by: Fred I. Lamson

Member of the Massachusetts Senate from the 4th Suffolk District
- In office 1947–1964
- Preceded by: Leo J. Sullivan
- Succeeded by: Joe Moakley

Personal details
- Born: November 10, 1910 Boston, Massachusetts
- Died: July 31, 1998 (aged 87) Hyannis, Massachusetts
- Party: Democratic

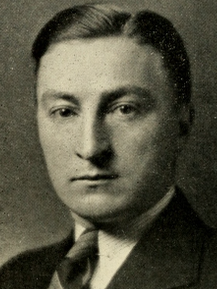
Powers circa 1939

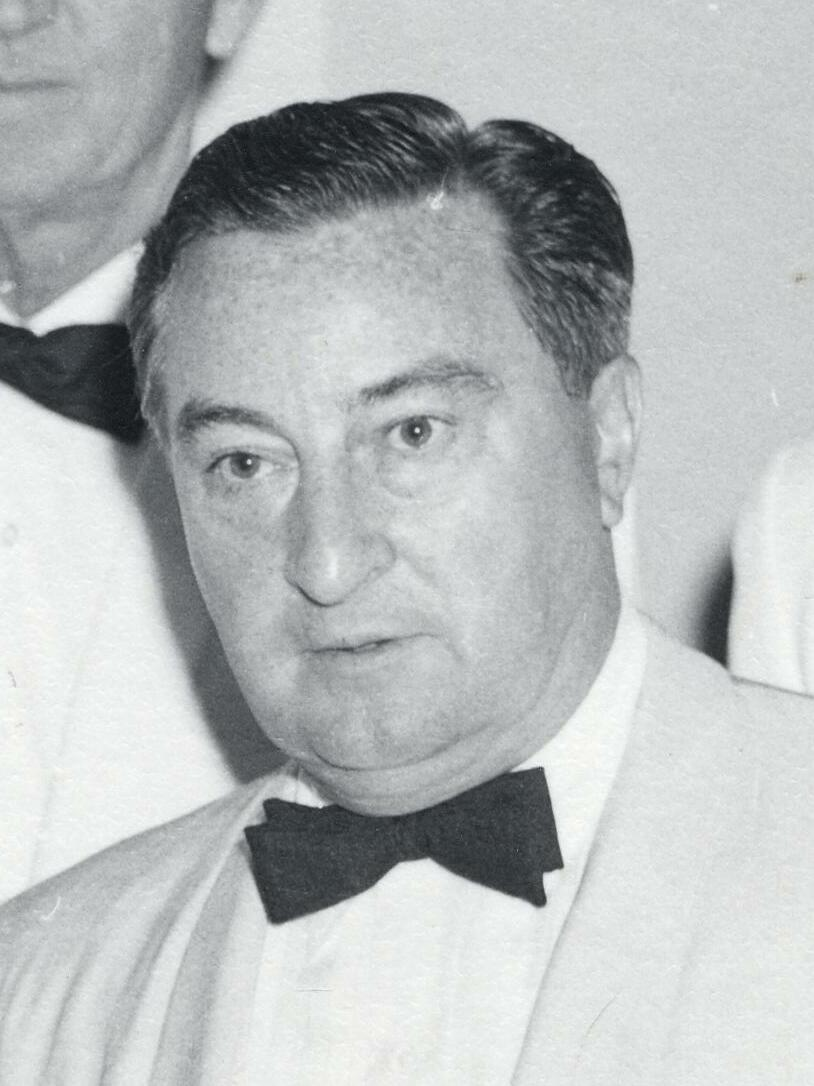
Powers in the 1960s

John E. Powers (November 10, 1910 – July 31, 1998) was an American politician who served as President of the Massachusetts Senate from 1959 to 1964.

Powers, a former clam digger, messenger, and machine operator, served as a State Senator from Boston from 1940 to 1964 and Supreme Judicial Court of Suffolk County from 1964 to 1988. He was twice a candidate for Mayor of Boston. He lost to incumbent John B. Hynes in the 1955 mayoral election. Following Hynes's retirement, Powers became the front-runner for the mayorship, however he lost to Boston City Council member John F. Collins in the 1959 mayoral election, despite having the most votes in the preliminary election amongst five candidates.

Powers is remembered on the Boston Irish Heritage Trail.

== See also ==
- Massachusetts legislature: 1939, 1941–1942, 1943–1944, 1945–1946, 1947–1948, 1949–1950, 1951–1952, 1953–1954, 1955–1956, 1957–1958, 1959–1960, 1961–1962, 1963–1964
