= 1955 Boston mayoral election =

Election in Massachusetts, United States

- November 8, 1955
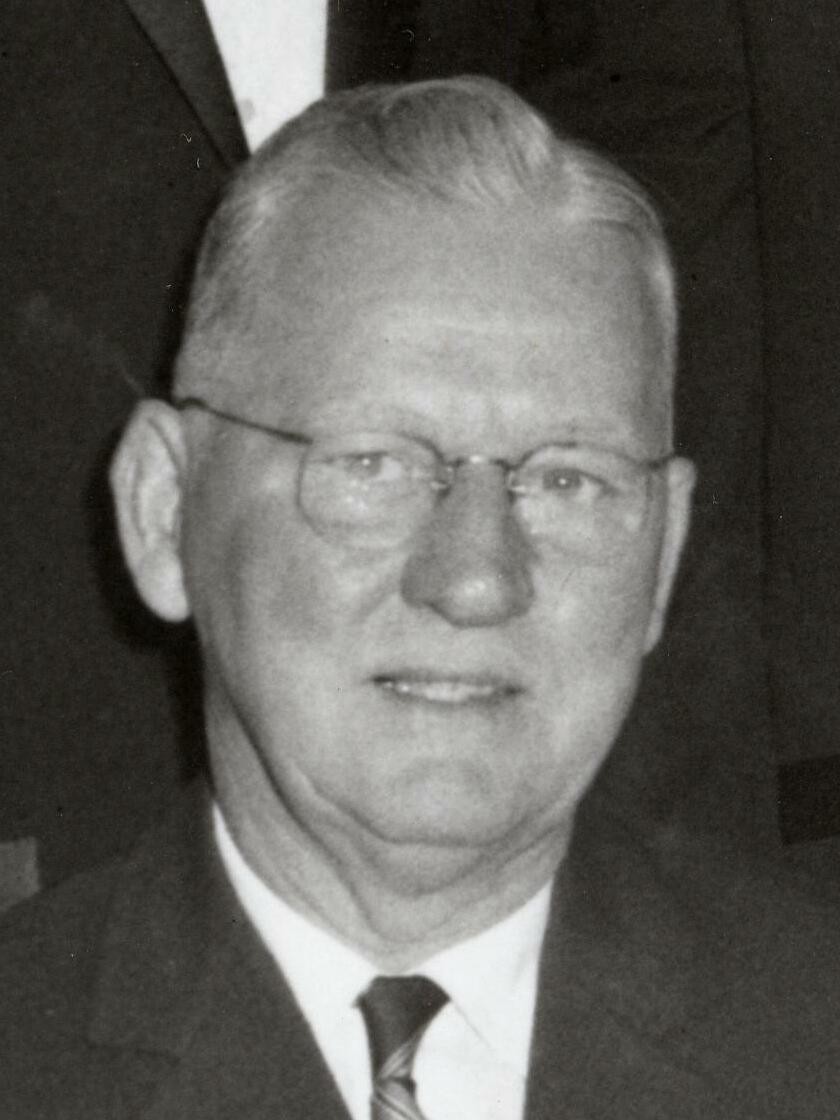

Candidate	John B. Hynes	John E. Powers
Party	Nonpartisan	Nonpartisan
Popular vote	124,301	111,775
Percentage	52.77%	47.23%
- Results by ward Hynes: 50–60% 60–70% 70–80% Powers: 50–60% 60–70% 70–80%
Mayor before election
John B. Hynes
Elected mayor
John B. Hynes

The Boston mayoral election of 1955 occurred on Tuesday, November 8, 1955, between Mayor John B. Hynes and State Senator John E. Powers. Hynes was elected to his third term.

The nonpartisan municipal preliminary election was held on September 27, 1955.

This election was the first held under new ward boundaries, which remain in place for the city of Boston as of 2023.

== Candidates ==
- John B. Hynes, Mayor of Boston, Massachusetts since 1950, Acting Mayor in 1947.
- John E. Powers, member of the Massachusetts Senate since 1940.

=== Candidates eliminated in preliminary ===
- James Michael Curley, Mayor of Boston from 1914 to 1918, 1922 to 1926, 1930 to 1934, 1946 to 1950. Member of the United States House of Representatives from 1913 to 1914 and from 1943 to 1947. Governor of Massachusetts from 1935 to 1937. Member of the Massachusetts House of Representatives from 1902 to 1903.
- Chester A. Dolan Jr., Clerk of the Massachusetts Supreme Judicial Court. President of the Massachusetts Senate in 1949.

== Results ==
Candidates	Preliminary election		General election	
Candidates	Votes	%	Votes	%
John B. Hynes (incumbent)	50,957	39.16	124,301	52.77
John E. Powers	36,407	28.00	111,775	47.23
James Michael Curley	24,209	18.60		
Chester A. Dolan	18,551	14.25		

== See also ==
- List of mayors of Boston, Massachusetts
