= Kevin B. Harrington =

American politician (1929–2008)

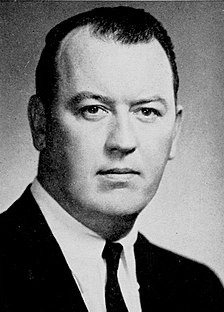
- Harrington in 1967

President of the Massachusetts Senate
- In office 1971–1978
- Preceded by: Maurice A. Donahue
- Succeeded by: William Bulger

Member of the Massachusetts Senate from the 2nd Essex District
- In office 1959–1978
- Preceded by: Herbert Tuckerman
- Succeeded by: John G. King

President of the National Conference of State Legislatures
- In office 1975
- Preceded by: inaugural holder
- Succeeded by: Tom Jensen

Personal details
- Born: Kevin Brian Harrington; January 9, 1929 Salem, Massachusetts
- Died: November 27, 2008 (aged 79) Danvers, Massachusetts
- Party: Democratic
- Spouse: Kathleen M. Carney
- Children: 5
- Education: Saint Louis University; Suffolk Law School
- Profession: Teacher

Kevin Brian Harrington (January 9, 1929 – November 27, 2008) was a Massachusetts politician who served as President of the Massachusetts State Senate.

== Early life, education, and career ==
The youngest of six children, Harrington was born on January 9, 1929 in Salem, Massachusetts to Cornelius and Mary (née Whalen) Harrington. His family was Irish, coming from Donegal, and was politically prominent: two Harringtons served as Mayors of Salem, two more in the State Senate, two in the State House and one in Congress. Cornelius Harrington died in 1935 when Kevin was just 6 years old. Despite this, Harrington graduated from St. Mary's Boys High School in Lynn, and attended Saint Louis University on a basketball scholarship. He taught government and history and coached basketball at Merrimack College.

He was a member of the Salem City Council during 1957–1959 and was elected to the State Senate in 1958. While in the senate, he helped to devise a gerrymander that helped Democrats to hold control of the previously-mostly Republican controlled institution. In 1965, he was chosen as Majority Floor Leader.

He became Senate President in 1971. One of his major decisions was to block the reinstatement of the death penalty in 1976. He was touted as a primary challenger to governor Mike Dukakis until he retired from the Senate in 1978 amid an investigation into a $2,000 illegal campaign check he allegedly cashed in 1970.

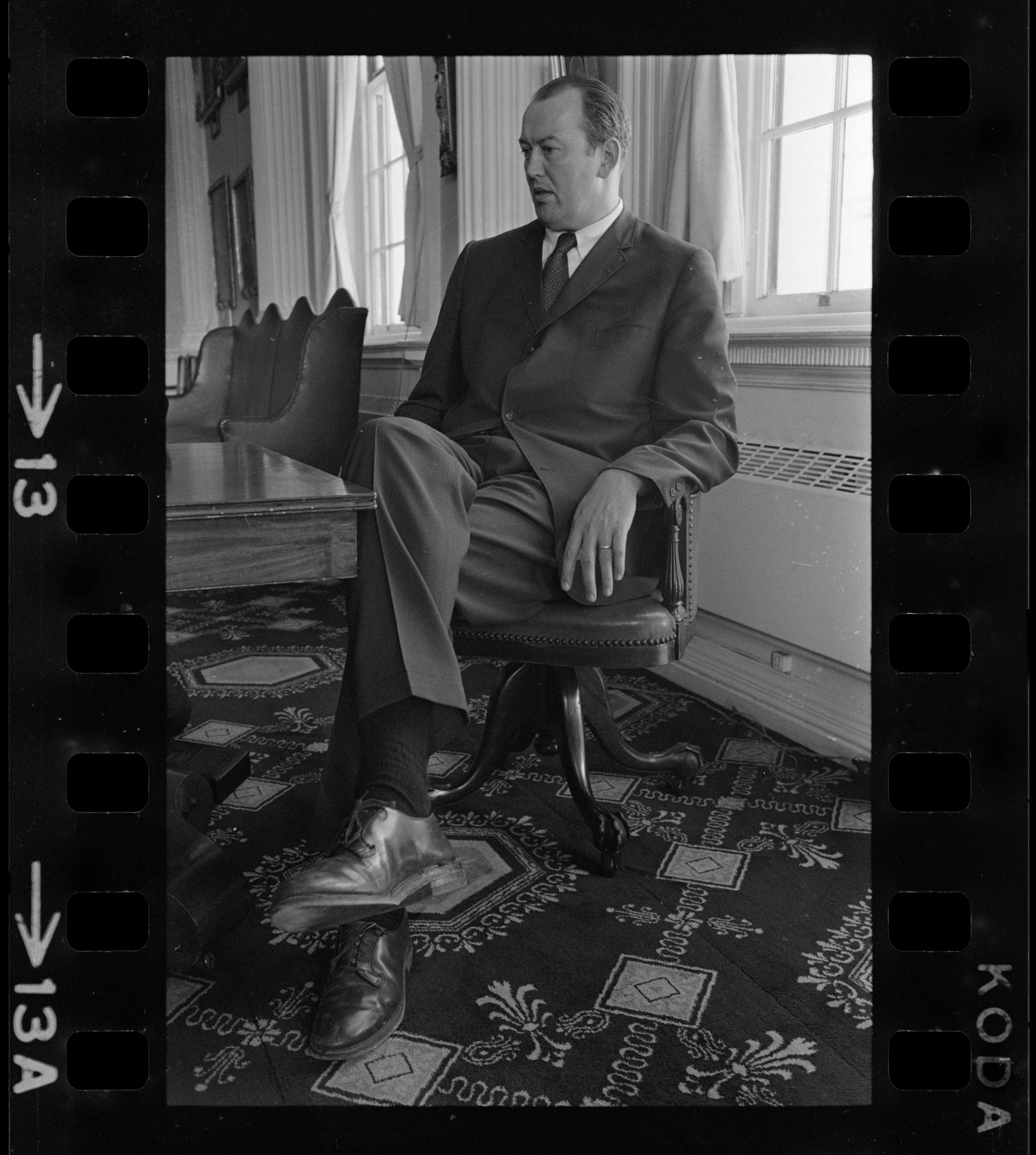
Harrington, Kevin (senator) Jan. 7, 1971 New Senate President

== Personal life ==
He married Kathleen Carney in 1955, and had two sons and three daughters. He was a Roman Catholic.

Harrington was a member of Saint Anselm College Board of Trustees and was instrumental in the creation of the New Hampshire Institute of Politics at the college. Because of his work at Saint Anselm College, The Kevin B. Harrington Student Ambassador Program is named in his legacy.

== See also ==
- 1959–1960 Massachusetts legislature
- 1961–1962 Massachusetts legislature
- 1963–1964 Massachusetts legislature
- 1965–1966 Massachusetts legislature
- 1967–1968 Massachusetts legislature
- 1969–1970 Massachusetts legislature
- 1971–1972 Massachusetts legislature
- 1973–1974 Massachusetts legislature
- 1975–1976 Massachusetts legislature
- 1977–1978 Massachusetts legislature
- The Harrington family

Political offices
Preceded by Maurice A. Donahue	President of the Massachusetts Senate; 1971 – July 31, 1978	Succeeded by William M. Bulger
