= Maurice A. Donahue =

American politician

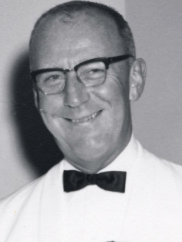
- Donahue, circa 1960-1968

President of the Massachusetts Senate
- In office 1964–1971
- Preceded by: John E. Powers
- Succeeded by: Kevin B. Harrington

Member of the Massachusetts Senate from the 2nd Hampden District
- In office 1951–1971
- Preceded by: William E. Nolan
- Succeeded by: Roger L. Bernashe

Personal details
- Born: September 21, 1918 Holyoke, Massachusetts
- Died: January 13, 1999 (aged 80)
- Party: Democratic
- Relations: Martin J. Dunn (nephew)

Maurice A. Donahue (September 21, 1918 – January 13, 1999) was an American politician who served as President of the Massachusetts Senate from 1964 to 1971.

Donahue was first elected to the Massachusetts Senate in 1950 after spending two years in the Massachusetts House of Representatives. He became the Senate Majority Leader in 1958 and was elected Senate President in 1964. In the same year, and in conjunction with House Majority Whip Robert H. Quinn, Donahue introduced a corresponding bill in the Senate to establish the University of Massachusetts Boston. In 1970 he ran for Governor of Massachusetts, but lost the Democratic nomination to Boston Mayor Kevin H. White. He resigned from the Senate in 1971 to become Professor of Political Science and Director of the Institute for Governmental Services at the University of Massachusetts Amherst. In February 1989 the Institute was renamed in his honor and is now known as the UMass Donahue Institute.

He was a Knight of Columbus and a past grand knight of Holyoke Council number 90. Honoring Donahue is the Maurice A. Donohue Elementary School and the Maurice A. Donahue Building at Holyoke Community College both located in Holyoke, Massachusetts.

== See also ==
- Massachusetts legislature: 1951–1952, 1953–1954, 1955–1956, 1957–1958, 1959–1960, 1961–1962, 1963–1964, 1965–1966, 1967–1968, 1969–1970, 1971–1972
