= Edna Telford =

American politician

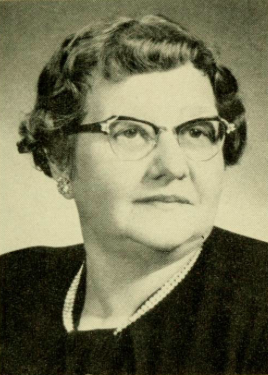

Member of the Massachusetts House of Representatives from the 9th Norfolk district
- In office 1955–1960

Edna Berenice Telford (born February 28, 1899) was an American Democratic politician from Plainville, Massachusetts. She represented the 9th Norfolk district in the Massachusetts House of Representatives from 1955 to 1960.
