= Irving Fishman =

American politician

Member of the Massachusetts Senate

Member of the Massachusetts House of Representatives

Personal details
- Born: March 29, 1921
- Died: January 4, 2014 (aged 92)
- Party: Democratic

not to be confused with Irving Fiske, born "Irving Louis Fishman"

Irving Fishman (March 29, 1921 – January 4, 2014) was an American lawyer and politician.

Born in Lynn, Massachusetts, Fishman received his bachelor's degree from Boston University and his law degree from Harvard Law School. Fishman then practiced law. He served in the Massachusetts House of Representatives 1962–1968 and the Massachusetts State Senate 1971–1974.

== Personal life ==
He was Jewish.
