= Gerald J. Morrissey =

American politician

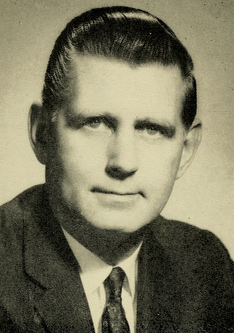
- Morrissey in 1967

Member of the Massachusetts House of Representatives
- In office 1963–1968

Personal details
- Born: May 20, 1927
- Died: May 2, 2018 (aged 90)
- Party: Democratic
- Education: Boston College; Calvin Coolridge College; Portia Law School

Gerald J. Morrissey (May 20, 1927 – May 2, 2018) was an American politician. He served as a Democratic member of the Massachusetts House of Representatives.

== Life and career ==
Morrissey attended Memorial High School, Boston College, Calvin Coolridge College and Portia Law School.

Morrissey served in the Massachusetts House of Representatives from 1963 to 1968.

Morrissey died on May 2, 2018, at the age of 90.
