= George J. O'Shea Jr. =

American politician (1929–2022)

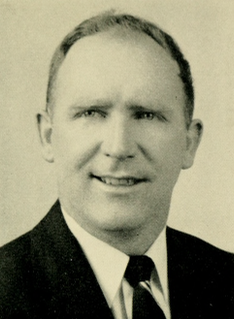

Member of the Massachusetts House of Representatives from the 12th Essex district
- In office 1957–1963
- Preceded by: Pasquale Caggiano
- Succeeded by: Thomas W. McGee

Personal details
- Born: January 5, 1929 Lynn, Massachusetts
- Died: December 27, 2022 (aged 93)
- Party: Democratic
- Spouse: Ann
- Education: Boston College
- Occupation: Real estate Insurance

George J. O'Shea Jr. (January 5, 1929 – December 27, 2022) was an American politician who represented the 12th Essex District in the Massachusetts House of Representatives from 1957 to 1963. He retired for the state legislature to run for the 6th congressional district in 1962, but lost to Republican incumbent William H. Bates. Outside politics he worked in real estate and insurance. He held several other titles, including assistant commissioner of the state department of youth services, director of the state's school adjustment counselor program, and professor at Northeastern University. He was the son of state representative George J. O'Shea Sr.
