= Philip N. Carney =

American politician

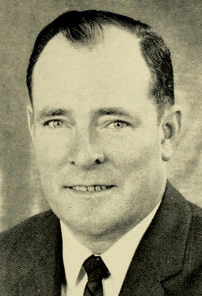

Member of the Massachusetts House of Representatives
- In office 1961–1971
- Preceded by: Michael J. Carroll
- Succeeded by: James J. Carrigan

Personal details
- Born: June 6, 1919 Lynn, Massachusetts
- Died: December 27, 2005 (aged 86) Nahant, Massachusetts
- Party: Democratic
- Education: Bentley School of Accounting and Finance; Boston University

Philip N. Carney (June 6, 1919 – December 27, 2005) was an American politician from Lynn, Massachusetts, who served in the Massachusetts House of Representatives.

== Early life ==
Carney was born on June 6, 1919, in Lynn, Massachusetts. He attended Saint Mary's Boys High School, Bentley School of Accounting and Finance, Boston University School of Business Administration. Prior to entering politics, Carney worked in real estate.

== Politics ==
From 1954 to 1957, Carney was a member of the Lynn City Council. In 1961 he ran in the special election fill the vacancy in the Massachusetts House of Representatives caused by the death of Michael J. Carroll. He won the Democratic primary over John F. Clancy by one vote and defeated Republican John F. Boot 3590 to 3173 in the special election. During his tenure, Carney brought forth legislation to build the Nahant Street area seawall along Lynn Shore Drive. He left the House in 1971.

== Later life ==
Carney lived in Nahant, Massachusetts, and Naples, Florida, during his final years. He died on December 27, 2005, in Nahant.
