= Mary Collins (First Lady of Boston) =

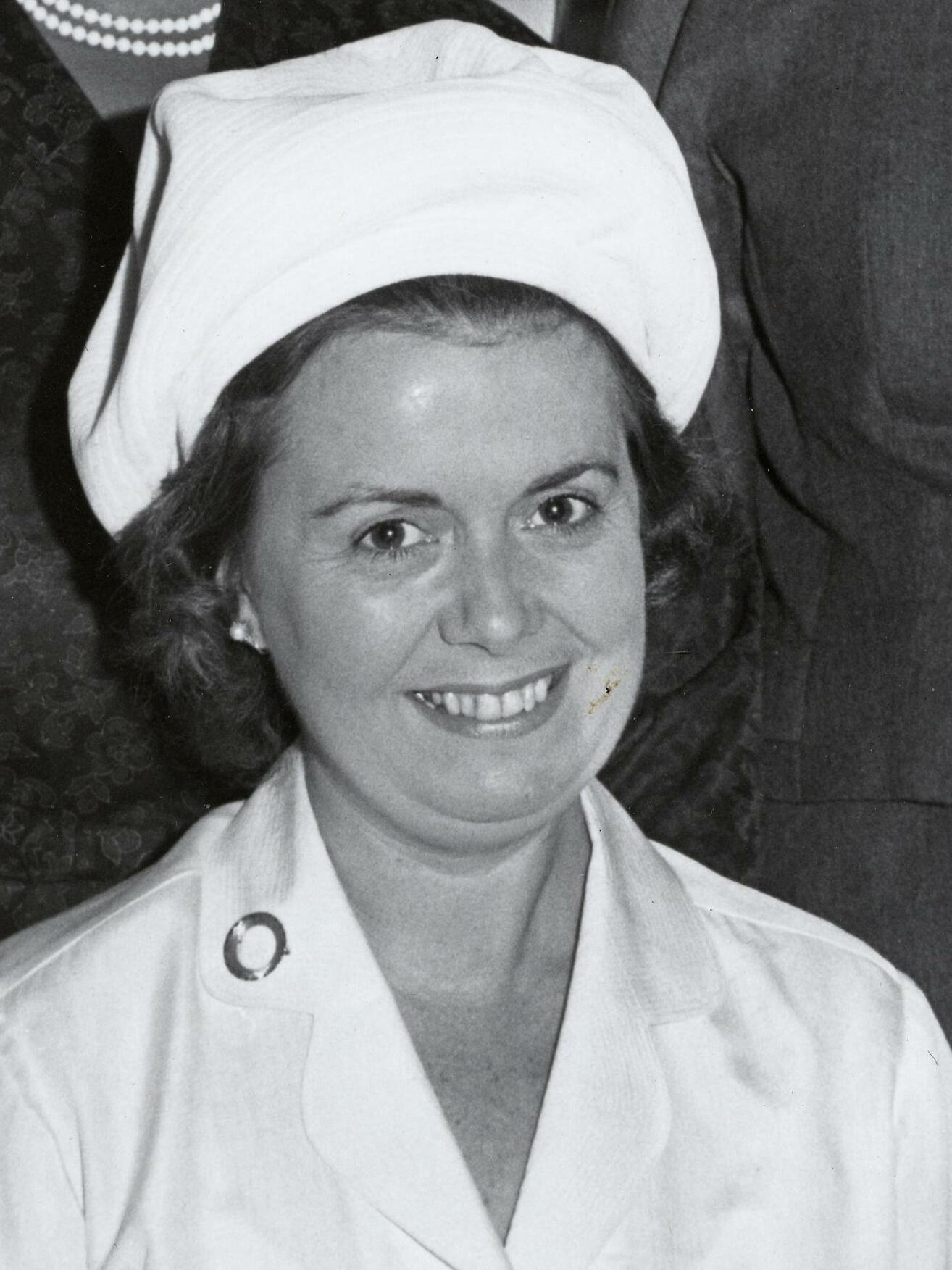
- Collins during her time as first lady of Boston

First Lady of Boston
- In office January 4, 1960 – January 1, 1968
- Mayor: John F. Collins
- Preceded by: Mary Hynes
- Succeeded by: Kathryn White

Personal details
- Born: Mary Patricia Cunniff; June 1920 Roxbury, Boston, Massachusetts, U.S.
- Died: November 5, 2010 (age 90) Falmouth, Massachusetts
- Resting place: St. Joseph Cemetery in West Roxbury, Massachusetts, U.S.
- Spouse: John F. Collins (m. 1946; died 1995)
- Children: 4

Mary Patricia Cunniff Collins (June 1920 – November 5, 2010) was an American who served as the First Lady of Boston from 1960 until 1968 during the mayoral tenure of her husband John F. Collins. Collins was considered an active municipal first lady. Collins' activities during her husband's mayoralty included serving a chairwoman of March of Dimes and on the boards of Faulkner Hospital and Boston's Museum of Fine Arts. Collins was also regarded as a key figure in her husband's political campaigns.

== Early life ==
Collins was born Mary Patricia Cunniff in June 1920 in the Roxbury neighborhood of Boston, Massachusetts. Before her birth, Collins' parents had immigrated to the United States from County Galway, Ireland and settled in Roxbury.

Collins graduated from St. Joseph's Academy, located in the Roxbury neighborhood.

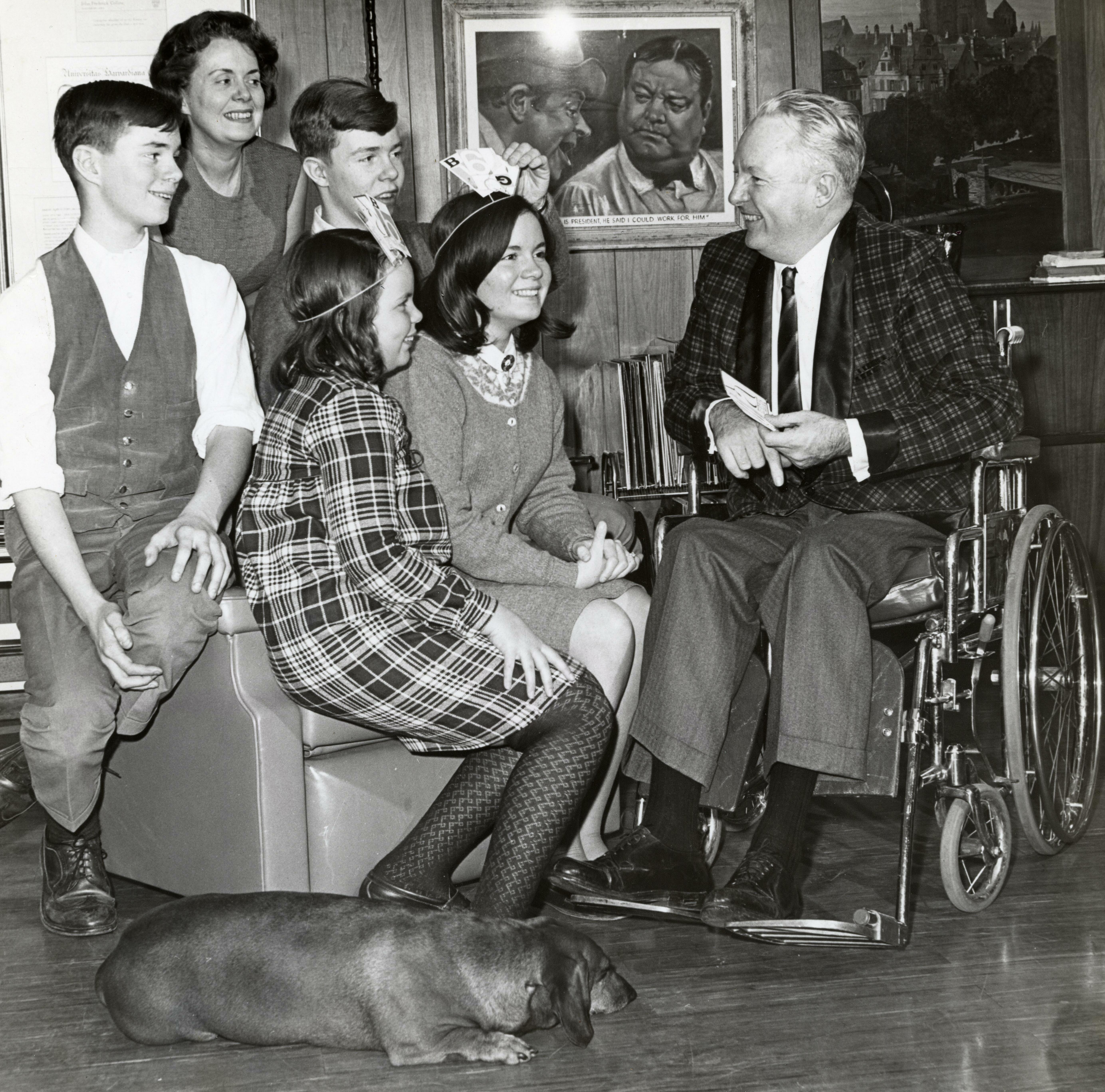
Collins with her husband and children (circa 1960-1968)

After training to become a legal secretary, Collins worked as a legal secretary at the Suffolk Superior Court in Boston in the 1940s. In her work, she met John F. Collins, who was working as a lawyer. After John F. Collins' service in as a military intelligence officer in World War II, the two married in 1946. They settled in the Jamaica Plain neighborhood of Boston, where they lived for three decades. Together they had four children: sons John F. Collins. Jr and Thomas F. Collins and daughters Margaret A. Collins and Mary Patricia Potter (née Collins).

== Work on her husband's political campaigns ==
Collins' husband entered politics, being elected to the Massachusetts House of Representatives in 1947. He would also serve as a Massachusetts state senator and a Boston City Councilor before his election as mayor of Boston. During her husband's political campaigns, Collins involved herself in his debate preparations by asking him practice questions and assisting him in refining his answers.

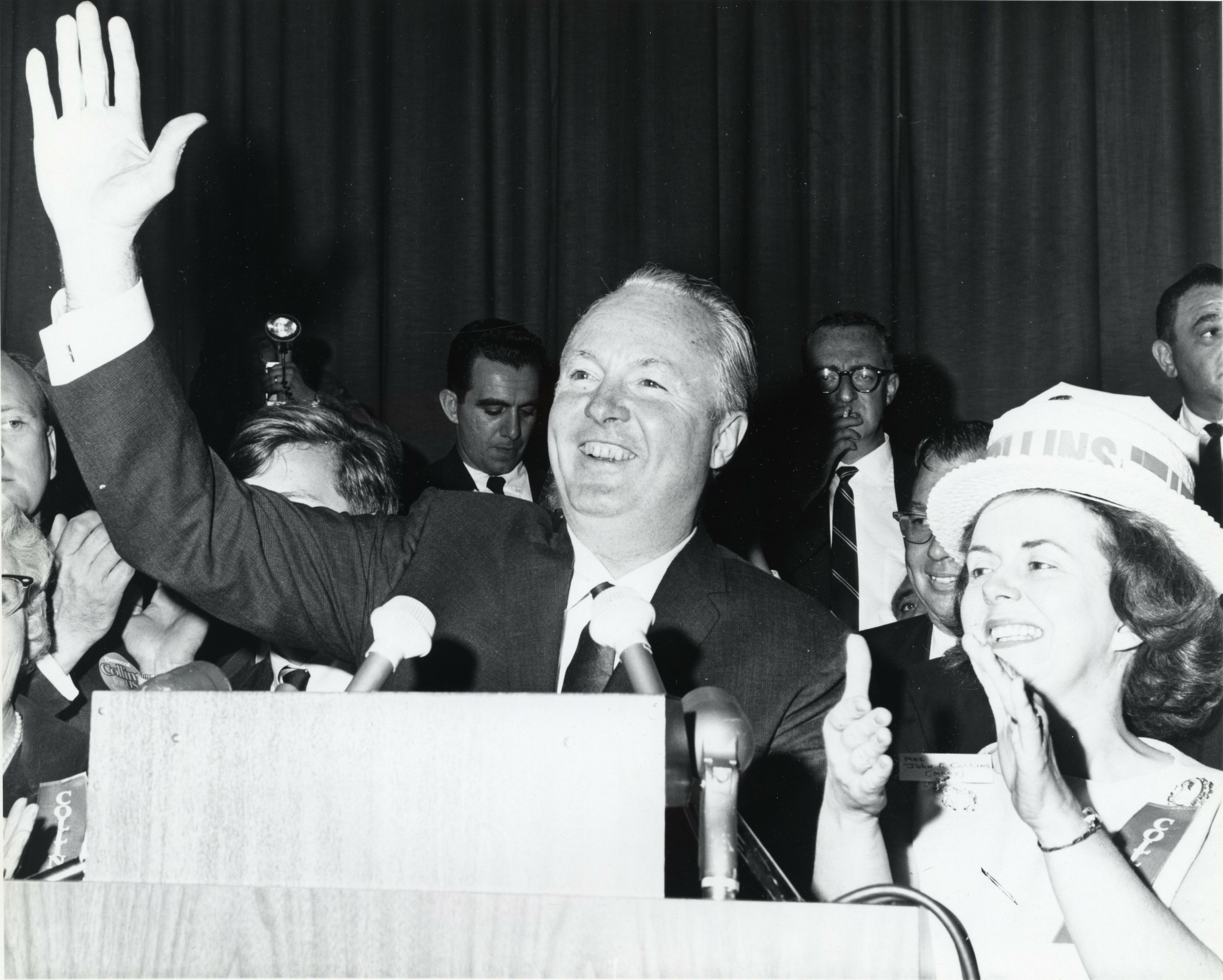
Collins (right) with her husband at an event for his 1966 United States Senate campaign

Collins would act as a major campaign surrogate for her husband during the multiple political campaigns he ran after his partial paralysis from polio in 1955. The Associated Press credited Collins as a "pleasing and persistent vote getter" for her husband's campaigns.

=== 1955 City Council campaign ===
In 1955, Collins' husband ran for election to the Boston City Council. The election was an at-large multi-seat election.

In September 1955, only ten days prior to the nonpartisan primary election, John F. Collins and three of the Collins's children (Patricia, John Jr., and Tommy) contracted the Polio virus. While the Collins children recovered without any lasting effects, John Collins Sr. was left partially paralyzed.

With her husband unable to campaign in the closing days before the primary, Mary Collins became an active surrogate for him. She visited all 22 wards of the city, speaking on behalf of her husband's candidacy. Collins's husband managed to prevail as one of the 18 candidates to advance to the general election. However, he was still bedridden in the hospital unable to campaign for six weeks between the primary and general election. As a result, Mary Collins continued to be a surrogate stump speaker. Her hard campaigning secured a third-place finish, making John Collins one of the nine candidates to be elected to the city council.

Collins' husband had his legs paralyzed in 1955 after contracting polio. His bout with polio took place during his campaign for election to the Boston City Council. During her husband's hospitalization, Collins ran his campaign as a co-manager, working from their personal residence in the Jamaica Plain neighborhood of Boston.

=== 1959 mayoral ===
Her husband's victory in the 1959 Boston mayoral election was considered the biggest upset victories in city politics in decades. Prognosticators had broadly seen him as an underdog, and did not expect him to advance to the general election. His advancement to the general election (denying Powers a widely-predicted second-place finish in the primary) and ultimate victory was a major political surprise.

=== 1966 U.S. Senate ===
During his mayoralty, Collins' husband unsuccessfully ran in the 1966 United States Senate election in Massachusetts. Collins played an active role in her husband's United States Senate campaign.

== First Lady of Boston ==
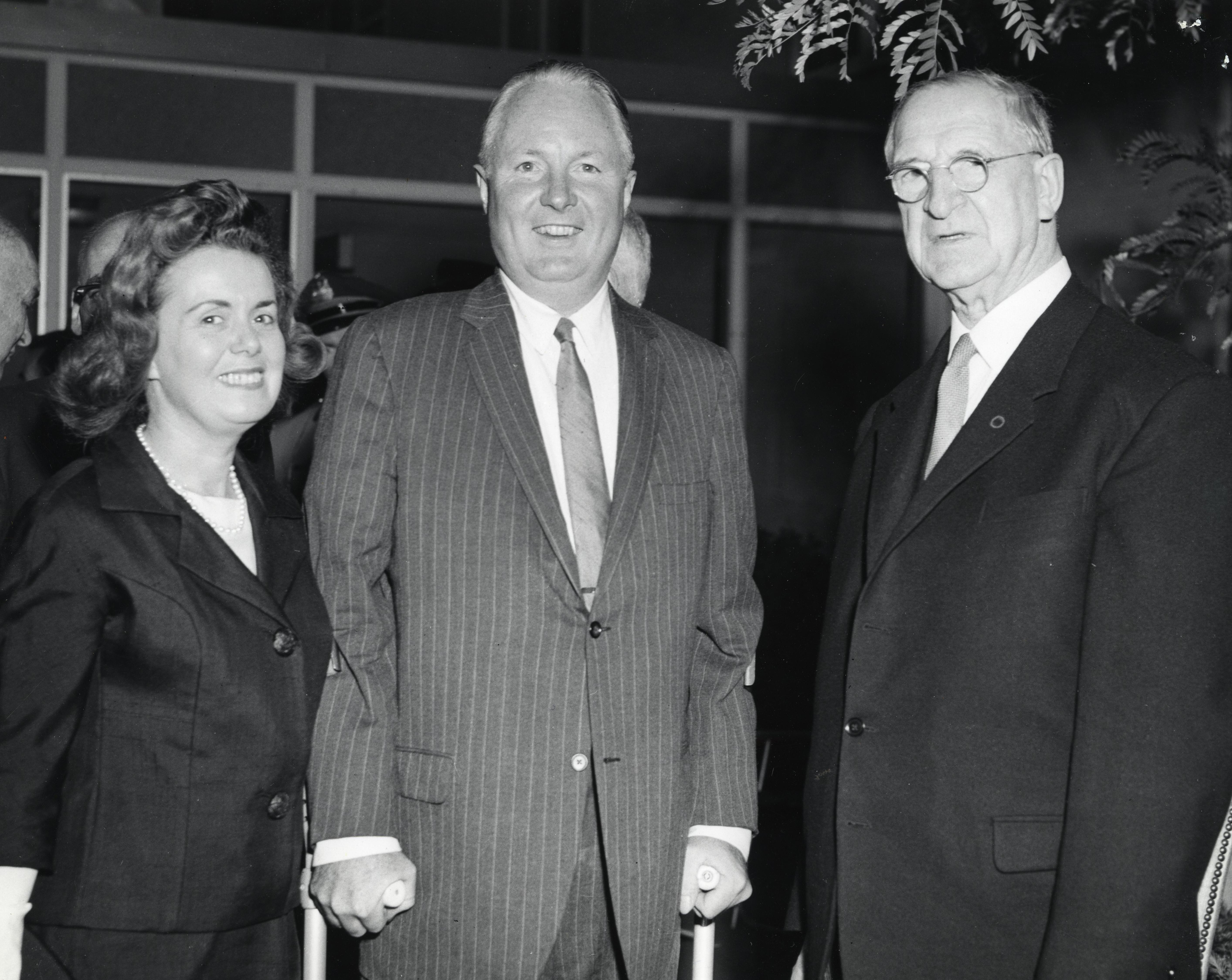
Collins and her husband meet with Éamon de Valera (right), the president of Ireland

Collins' husband was elected mayor of Boston in 1959. Collins is considered to have been a primary player in the success of her husband's candidacy. Her husband served as mayor from 1960 until 1968, being reelected in 1963.During her husband's mayoralty, Collins was an active municipal first lady.

Collins served for a time as a chairwoman of March of Dimes a nonprofit organization which raised funds for polio treatment and research. She also served on the boards of several institutions, including Faulkner Hospital and Boston's Museum of Fine Arts.

== Later life ==
In the 1990s, Collins and her husband moved to Falmouth, Massachusetts. Collins would live there for the next fifteen years. She served on the boards of several local nonprofits in Falmouth. Her husband died in 1995, leaving Collins a widow.

Collins died from a heart attack at the age of 90 on November 5, 2010, at the Atria Woodbriar Living Group assisted living facility in Falmouth. After her death, Raymond Flynn, a one-time mayor of Boston, remarked that Collins, "was a wonderful mother, wife, friend and great first lady of Boston. She and Mayor Collins represented all that was special about Boston." She was interred alongside her late husband at St. Joseph Cemetery in West Roxbury, Massachusetts.
