= John P. McMorrow =

American politician (1926–2008)

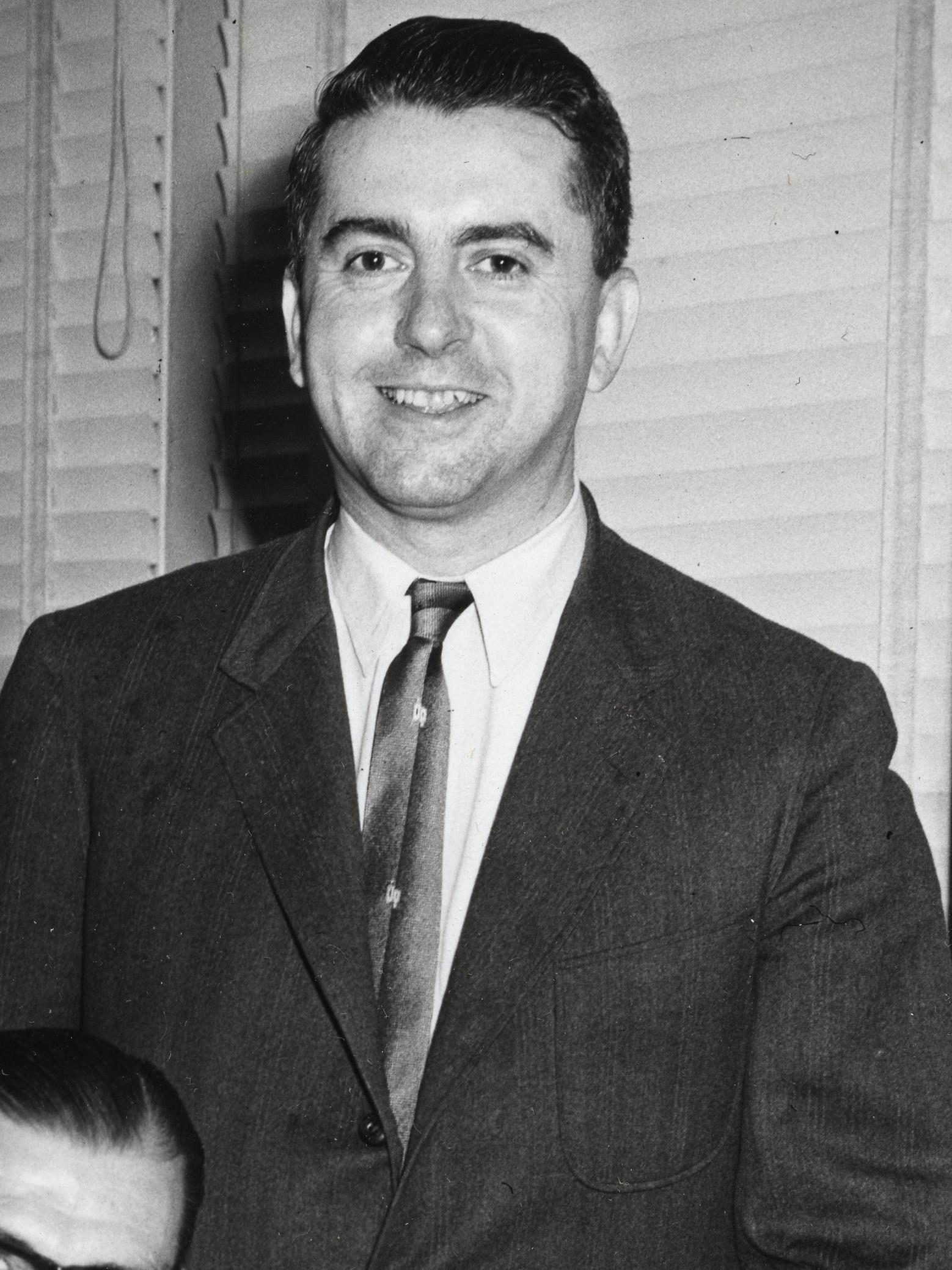
- McMorrow in the 1960s

Deputy Mayor of Boston
- In office 1960–1961
- Preceded by: William Arthur Reilly
- Succeeded by: Henry Scagnoli

Chairman of the Boston School Committee
- In office 1957
- Preceded by: Joseph Lee
- Succeeded by: George F. Hurley

Member of the Boston School Committee
- In office 1956–1960

Member of the Massachusetts House of Representatives for the 15th Suffolk District
- In office 1953–1957
- Preceded by: Francis Xavier Joyce
- Succeeded by: George V. Kenneally Jr.

Personal details
- Born: September 19, 1926 Dorchester
- Died: November 23, 2008 (aged 82) Roslindale
- Party: Democratic
- Education: Harvard College; Harvard University; Boston College

John Philip McMorrow (1926–2008) was an American politician and government official for the city of Boston.

== Early life ==
McMorrow was born on September 19, 1926, to Philip and Theresa (Murphy) McMorrow. His father served in the Massachusetts House of Representatives from 1939 to 1947.

McMorrow grew up in Dorchester. He graduated from the Boston Latin School in 1943. From 1944 to 1946 he served in the United States Navy in the Pacific and China. He resumed his education after the War and graduated from Harvard College in 1948. He earned a Master of Arts degree from the Harvard Graduate School of Arts and Sciences in 1950 and later received a Master of Education degree from Boston College.

Outside of politics, McMorrow taught English at Boston Latin and Newman Preparatory School and was director of research and statistics for the Massachusetts Department of Education. In the latter role, McMorrow was responsible for the disbursement of $35 million in funds to schools throughout Massachusetts.

== Political career ==
From 1953 to 1957, McMorrow represented Dorchester in the Massachusetts House of Representatives.

In 1955, McMorrow ran for a seat on the Boston School Committee. He campaigned on a platform supporting the single-salary system for teachers and building new schools. He spent the final week of the campaign in the hospital with a viral infection. He finished third in an eight candidate race where the top five were elected. In 1957, McMorrow was unanimously elected chairman of the board. In the 1957 election, McMorrow topped the ticket in a contest that saw five supporters of the single-salary schedule elected to the board.

McMorrow was a candidate in the 1959 Boston mayoral election. He finished fifth in the five candidate primary election with 9% of the vote. Following his defeat, McMorrow backed second-place finisher John F. Collins over Senate President John E. Powers in the general election. Powers had the backing of the majority of Boston's politicians, including 40 of the city's 44 state representatives and U.S. Senator John F. Kennedy. The other two unsuccessful candidates, Gabriel F. Piemonte and James W. Hennigan Jr., declined to endorse either candidate. During the campaign, McMorrow worked as a strategist and assistant for Collins and following his upset victory, was his chief aide during the transition period. He studied a number of reforms aimed at streamlining city government, specifically in the areas of urban renewal, public relations, assessing, recreation, and administration. Collins took trips to Philadelphia and Newark to further study these reforms.

On December 18, 1959, Collins announced that McMorrow would serve as his deputy mayor (a position officially titled director of administrative services). In this role, McMorrow would "see that the policies enunciated by the administration are carried out", according to Collins. During his tenure as deputy mayor, McMorrow was known as "Mac the Knife" for his work in cutting the city budget.

In 1961, McMorrow was appointed to the newly created position of director of administrative management for the Boston Redevelopment Authority. He held this position until his retirement.

McMorrow died on November 23, 2008, at the Hebrew Rehabilitation Center in Boston.

== See also ==
- 1953–1954 Massachusetts legislature
- 1955–1956 Massachusetts legislature
