= John F. Collins =

American politician (1919–1995)

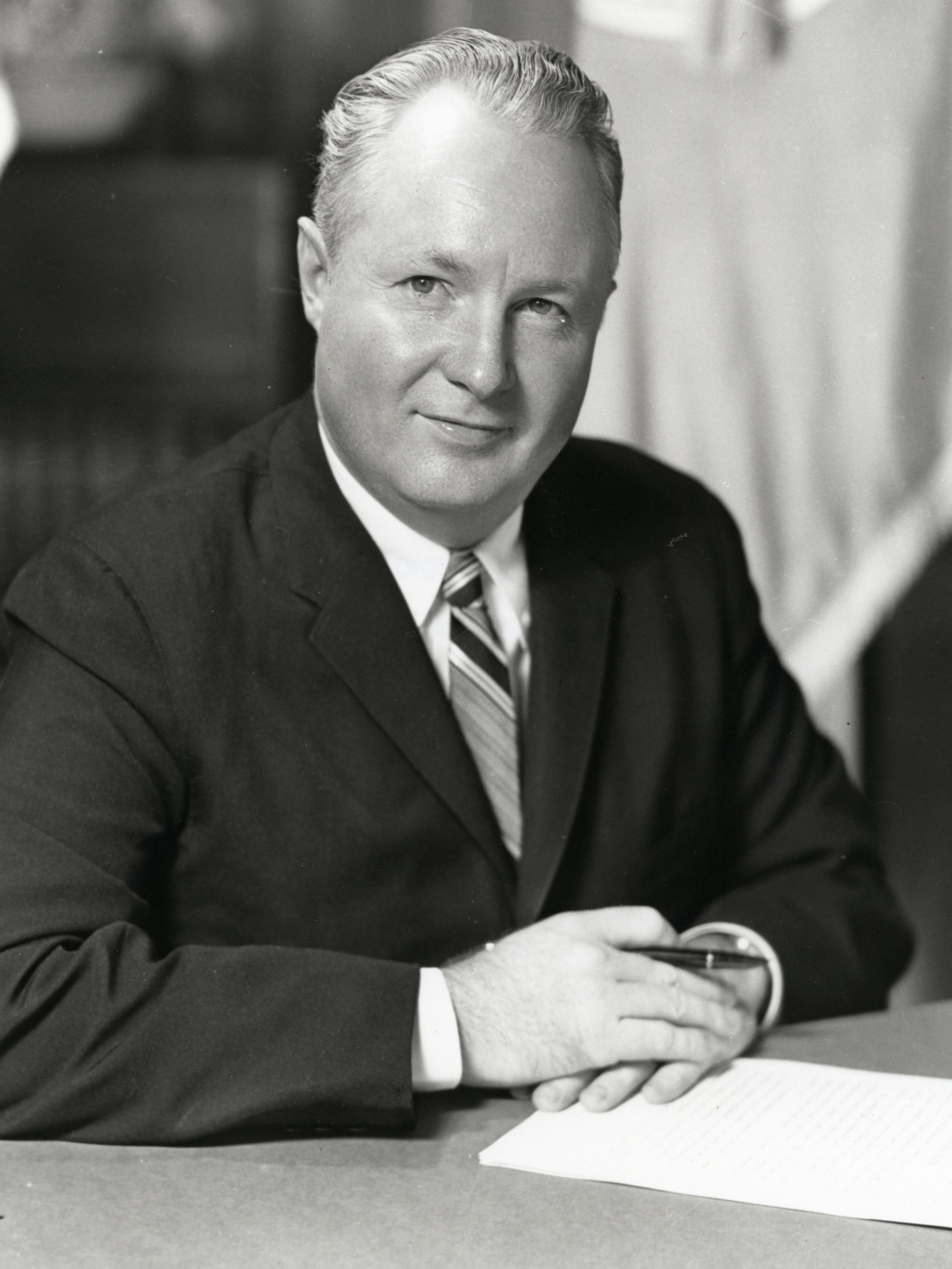
- Portrait of Collins in the 1960s

Mayor of Boston
- In office January 4, 1960 – January 1, 1968
- Preceded by: John Hynes
- Succeeded by: Kevin White

37th President of the National League of Cities
- In office 1964
- Preceded by: Lewis Wesley Cutrer
- Succeeded by: Henry Maier

Member of the Massachusetts Senate
- In office 1951–1955
- Preceded by: Chester A. Dolan Jr.
- Succeeded by: James W. Hennigan Jr.
- Constituency: 5th Suffolk

Member of the Massachusetts House of Representatives
- In office 1949–1951
- Preceded by: Vincent A. Mannering
- Succeeded by: Timothy J. McInerney, Philip Anthony Tracy, and David J. O'Connor
- Constituency: 10th Suffolk
- In office 1947–1949
- Preceded by: Frederick R. Harvey and Vincent A. Mannering
- Succeeded by: George Greene and Louis K. Nathanson
- Constituency: 11th Suffolk

Personal details
- Born: John Frederick Collins; July 20, 1919 Boston, Massachusetts, U.S.
- Died: November 23, 1995 (aged 76) Boston, Massachusetts, U.S.
- Resting place: St. Joseph Cemetery in West Roxbury, Massachusetts, U.S.
- Party: Democratic
- Spouse: Mary Patricia Cunniff (m. 1946)
- Education: Suffolk University Law School
- Profession: Lawyer

Military service
- Allegiance: United States
- Branch/service: United States Army
- Years of service: 1941-1946
- Rank: Captain
- Unit: Counterintelligence Corps
- Battles/wars: World War II

John Frederick Collins (July 20, 1919 – November 23, 1995) was an American lawyer who served as the mayor of Boston from 1960 to 1968. Collins was a lawyer who served in the Massachusetts Legislature from 1947 to 1955. He and his children caught polio during a 1955 outbreak. He was reliant on a wheelchair and crutches the rest of his life. After partially recovering, he ran for mayor in 1959 as an underdog. He successfully portrayed himself as outside corrupt "machine politics" and was elected.

As mayor, Collins is most remembered for a massive urban redevelopment program, which was spearheaded by Edward J. Logue and the Boston Redevelopment Authority and led to a rejuvenation of business in Boston. The city's seafront began changing into the business and tourist-friendly district seen in later decades. His actions were emulated by urban planners around the country, and the campaign was credited by later mayors as ensuring that Boston did not continue shrinking.

Later in his second term, Collins made an unsuccessful run in the Democratic primary of the 1966 United States Senate election in Massachusetts. After leaving politics, he worked as a visiting professor and lecturer.

== Early life ==
John Collins was born in Roxbury on July 20, 1919, to an Irish Catholic family. His father, Frederick "Skeets" Collins, worked as a mechanic for the Boston Elevated Railway. Collins graduated from Roxbury Memorial High School, and in 1941, from Suffolk University Law School. He served a tour in the Army Counterintelligence Corps during World War II, rising in rank from private to captain. He was a member of the Knights of Columbus.

In 1946, Collins married Mary Patricia Cunniff, a legal secretary, who Collins had met through his work as an attorney. She would later campaign for Collins when he was incapacitated by polio. The couple had four children.

== Early political career ==
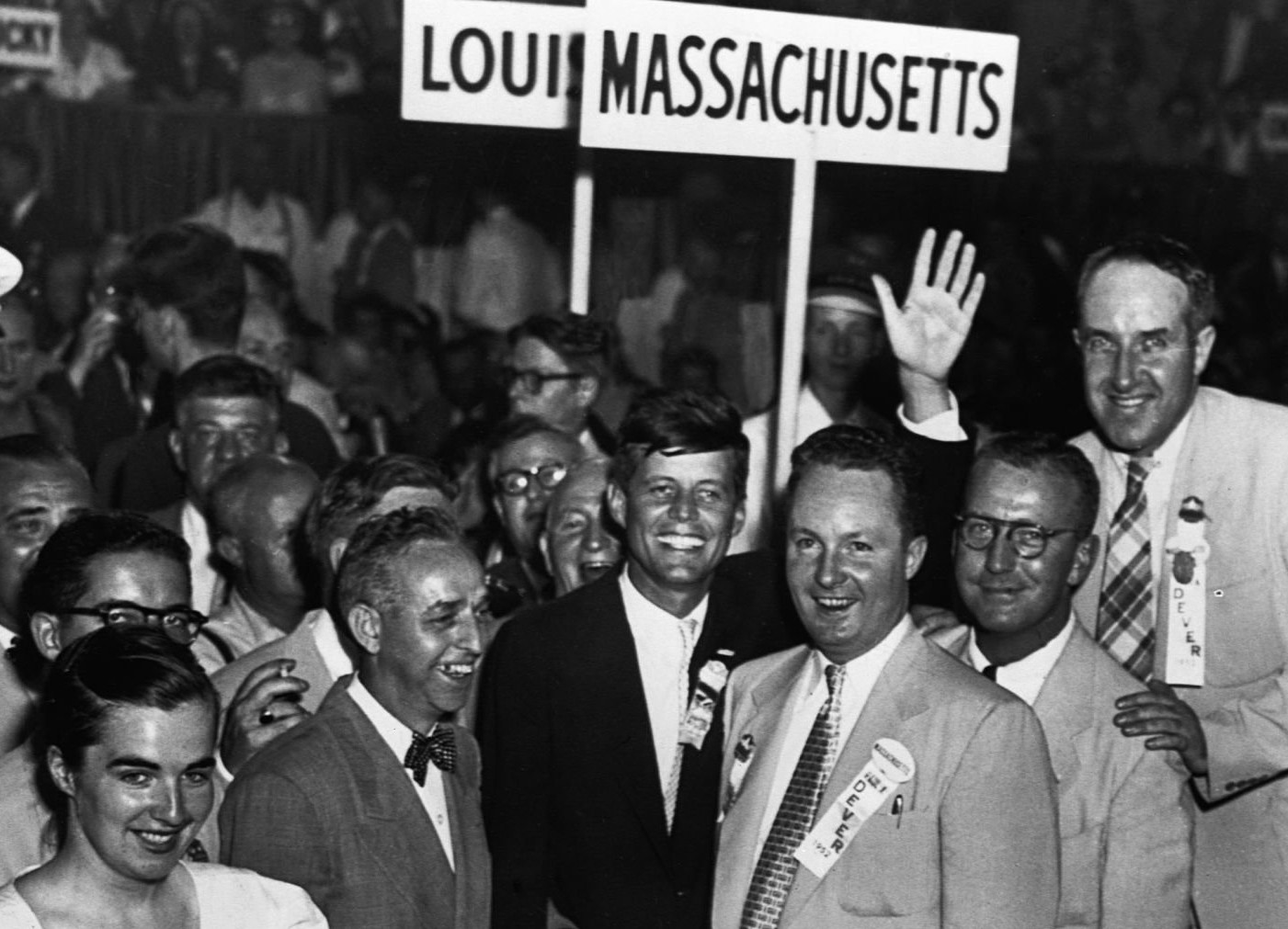
Collins (third from right) with then-congressman John F. Kennedy (fourth from right) and other members of the Massachusetts delegation at the 1952 Democratic National Convention

In 1947, Collins was elected to the Massachusetts House of Representatives, representing Jamaica Plain, and, in 1950, to the Massachusetts State Senate. Collins spent two terms as senator and then ran unsuccessfully for state attorney general in 1954, losing to George Fingold. While campaigning for a seat on the City Council in 1955, Collins and his children contracted polio. Collins's children recovered and he continued with his campaign despite warnings from his doctors. As a result of the disease, Collins was reliant on a wheelchair or crutches for the rest of his life. He was elected to the council and the following year was appointed Register of Probate for Suffolk County.

== Mayor of Boston ==
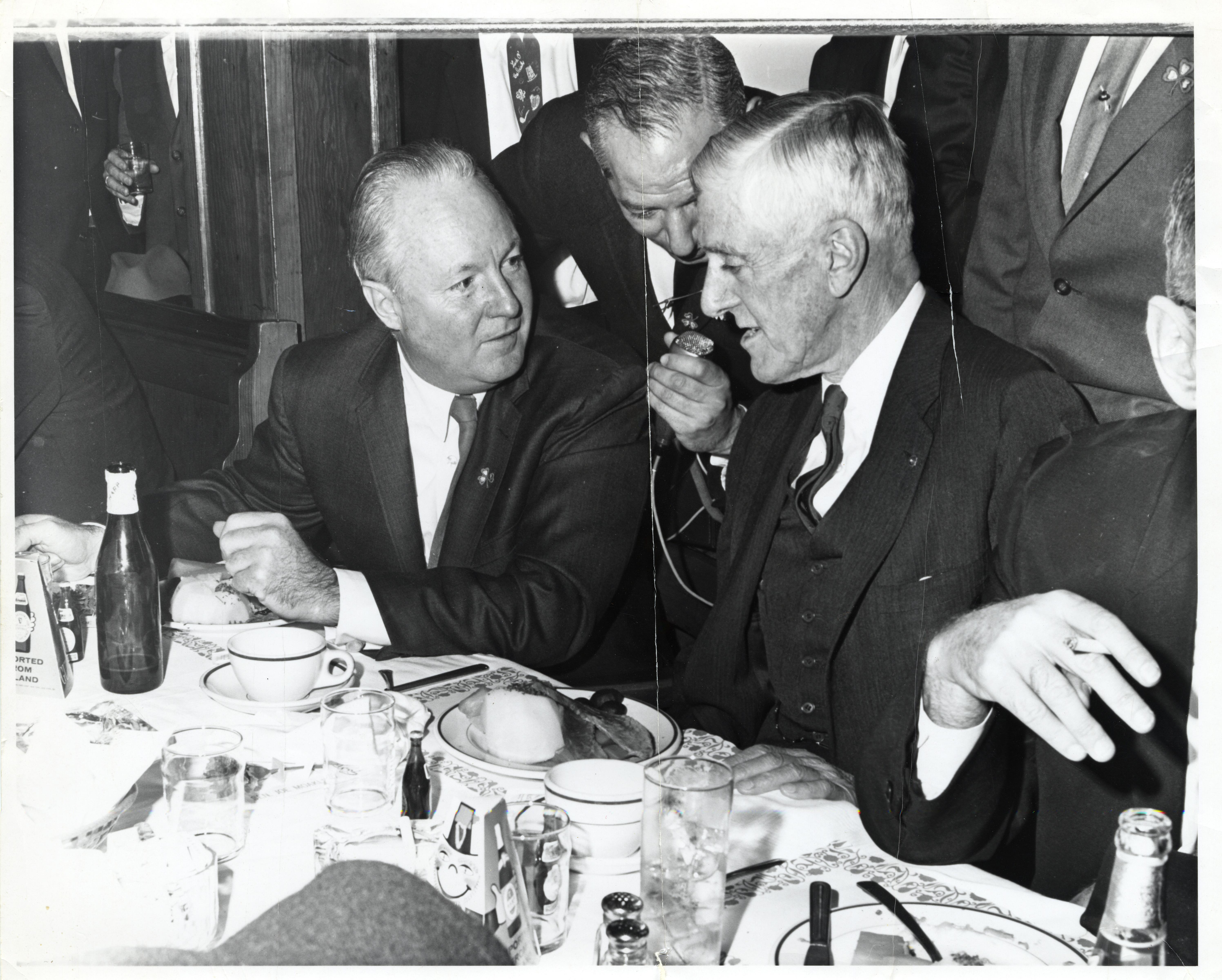
Collins with Massachusetts U.S. Senator Leverett Saltonstall (1945–1967). In 1966, Collins ran to succeed Saltonstall when Saltonstall retired but lost in the Democratic primary to former Massachusetts Governor Endicott Peabody (who in turn lost to Massachusetts Attorney General Edward Brooke).

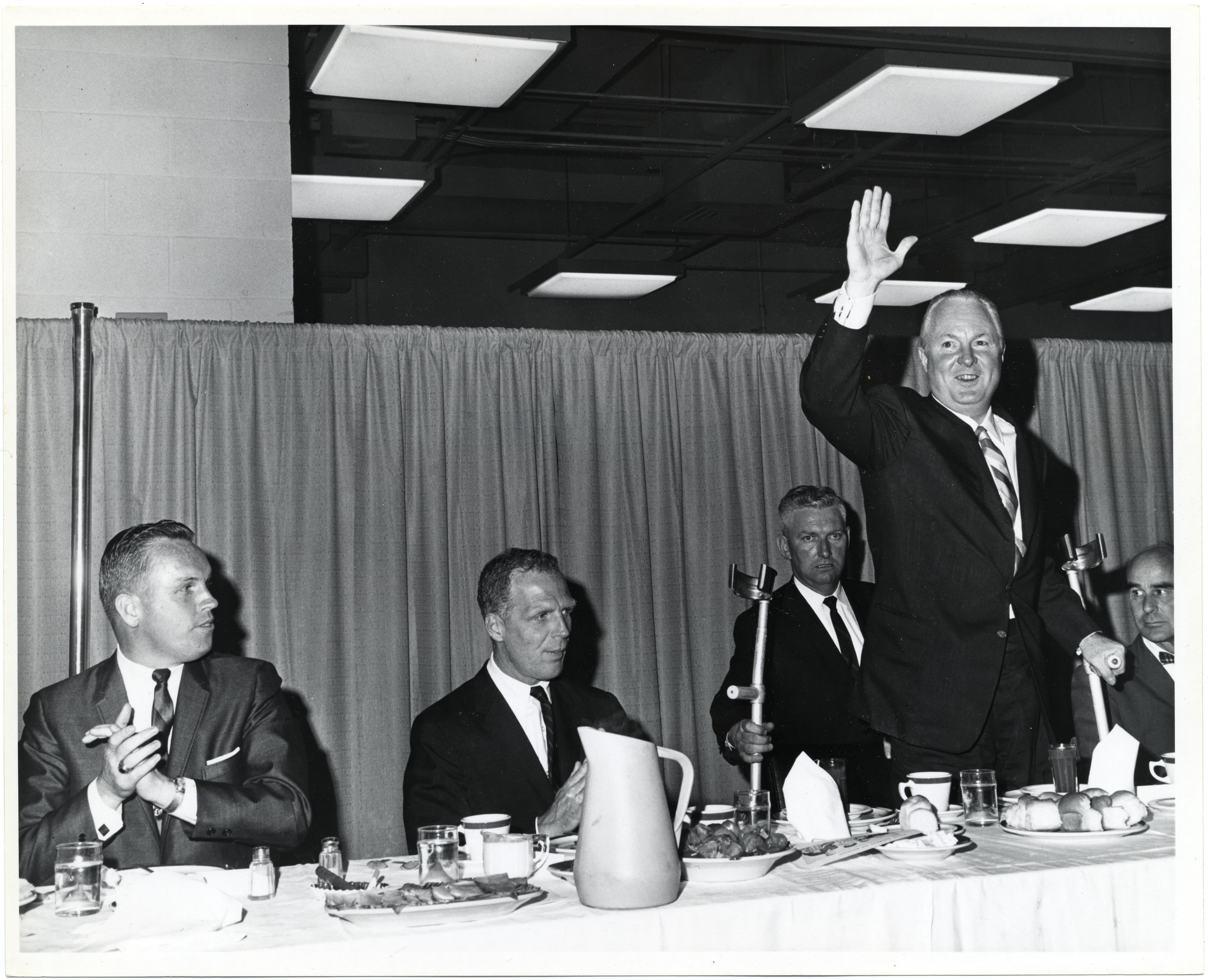
Collins with Massachusetts Secretary of the Commonwealth Kevin White (1961–1967). White would succeed Collins following the 1967 mayoral election.

In 1959, Collins ran against Massachusetts Senate President John E. Powers for Mayor of Boston. Collins was widely viewed as the underdog in the race. Powers was supported by Massachusetts U.S. Senator John F. Kennedy. Collins ran on the slogan "stop power politics", and was widely seen as independent of any political machine. Collins's victory in the 1959 mayoral election was considered the biggest upset in city politics in decades. Boston University political scientist Murray Levin wrote a book on the race, titled The Alienated Voter: Politics in Boston, which attributed Collins's victory to the voters' cynicism and resentment of the city's political elite.

Collins won re-election in 1963, easily defeating City Councilor Gabriel Piemonte. In 1966, a Boston Globe poll showed deep dissatisfaction with the Collins administration's urban renewal policies.

=== Urban renewal ===
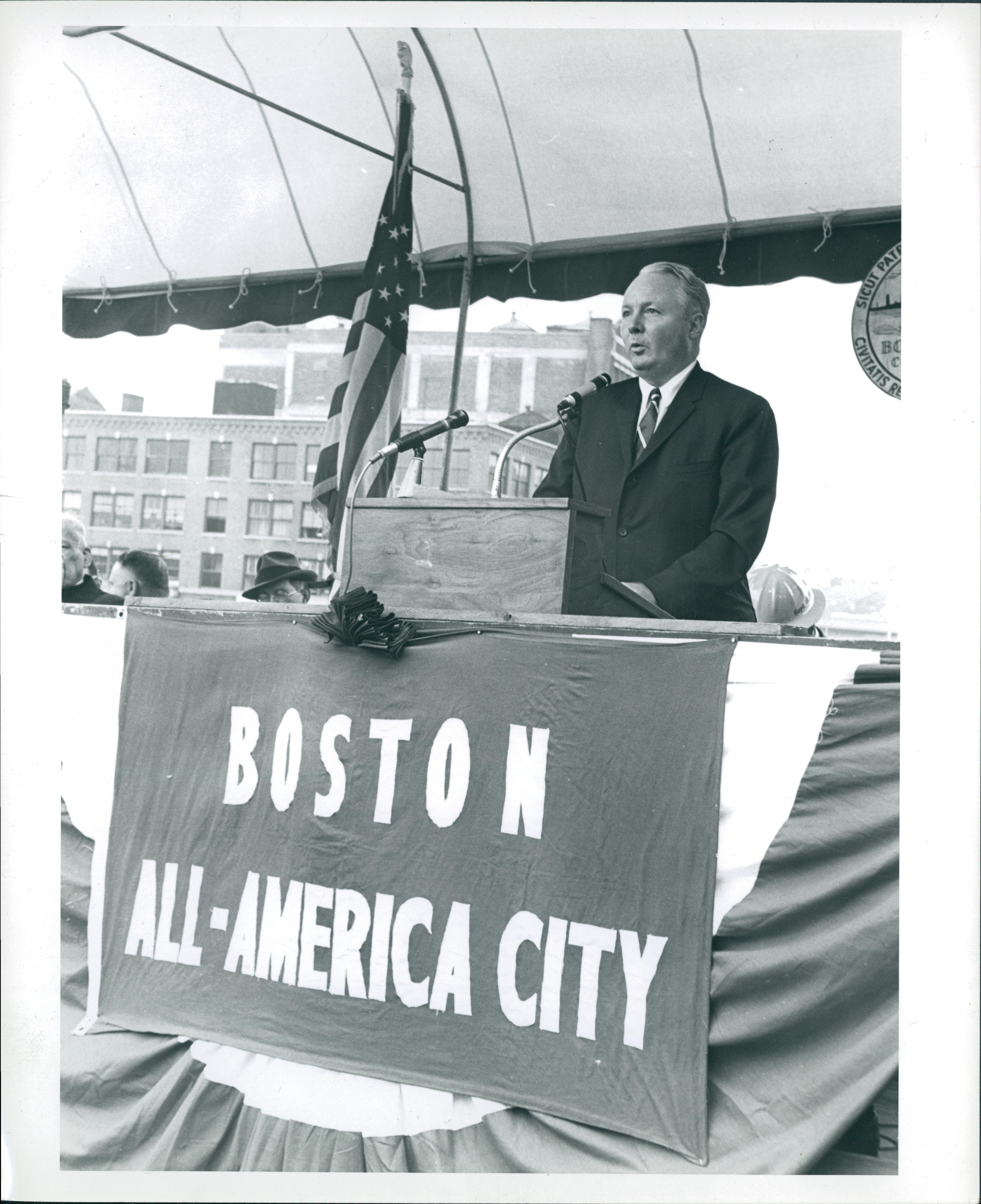
Collins speaking at the groundbreaking of Boston City Hall in 1963.

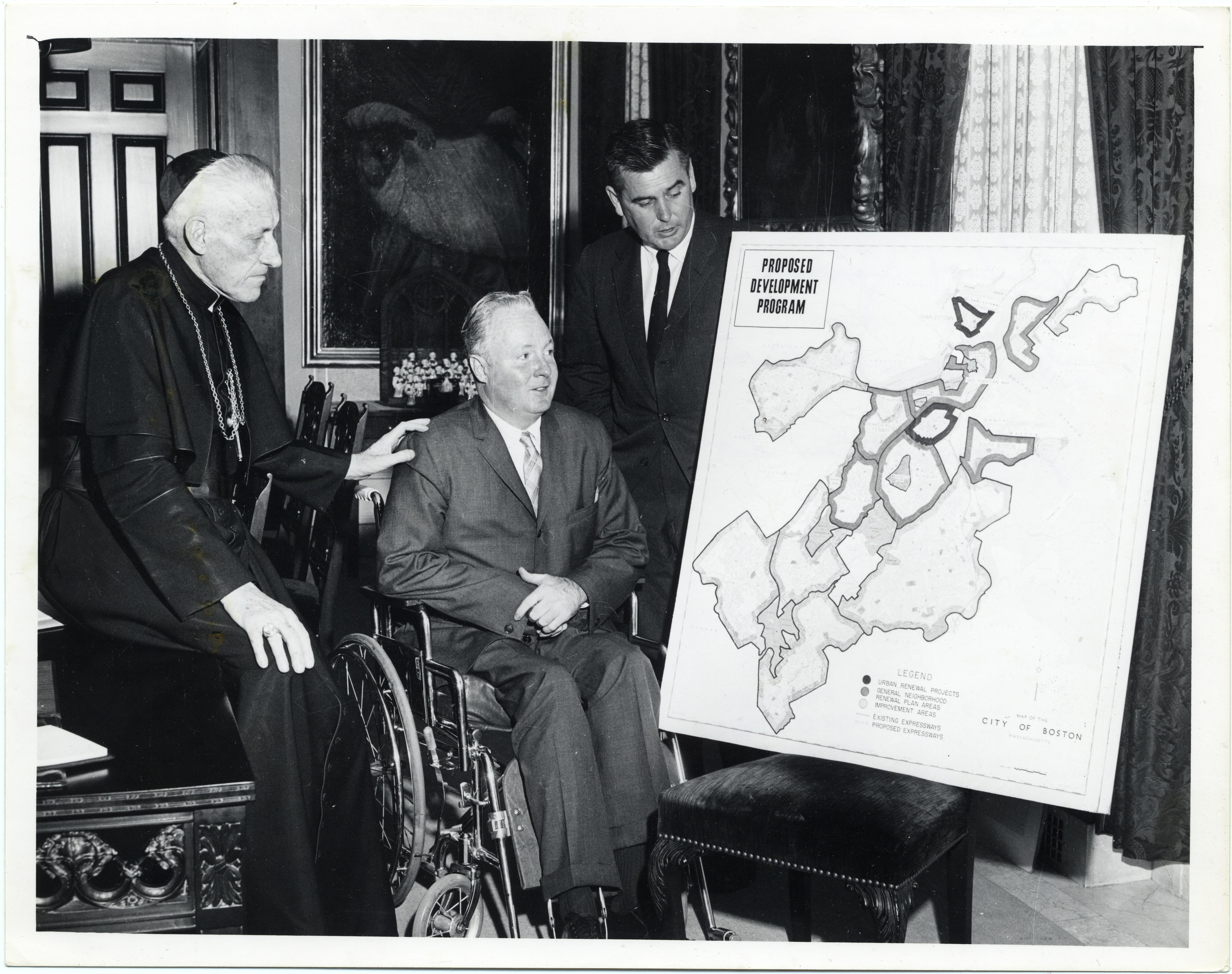
Boston Redevelopment Authority executive Edward J. Logue presents city redevelopment plans to Collins and Cardinal Richard Cushing, Archbishop of the Catholic Archdiocese of Boston (1944–1970).

Collins inherited a city in fiscal distress. Property taxes in Boston were twice as high as in New York or Chicago, even as the city's tax base was declining. Collins established a close relationship with a group of local business leaders known as the Vault, cut taxes in five of his eight years in office and imposed budget cuts on city government. Collins's administration focused on downtown redevelopment: Collins brought the urban planner Edward J. Logue (who had been serving as the administrator of the New Haven Redevelopment Agency) to Boston to lead the Boston Redevelopment Authority and Collins's administration supervised the construction of the Prudential Center complex and of Government Center.

When Collins lost his campaign for Massachusetts Attorney General in 1954, only one new private office building had appeared on the city skyline since 1929. One in five of the city's housing units were classified as dilapidated or deteriorating and the city was ranked lowest among major cities in building starts, while the only growing industries in the city were government and universities (leading to a narrowing tax base) and the city already had a higher number of municipal employees per capita than any major city in the United States. Urban renewal would affect 3,223 acres of the city, be highly profitable for the city's business community, and by the 1970s, led to Boston having the fourth-largest central-business-district office space in the United States as well as the highest construction rates. However, the city would lose more dwelling units than it would gain during the 1960s as Collins's budget priorities led to a decrease in city services outside of downtown, particularly parks, playgrounds, and schools in residential neighborhoods, and would often displace poor blacks and whites into neighborhoods with higher rents.

In March 1965, an investigative study of property tax assessment practices published by the National Tax Association of 13,769 properties sold within the City of Boston from January 1, 1960, to March 31, 1964, found that the assessed values in the neighborhood of Roxbury in 1962 were at 68 percent of market values while the assessed values in West Roxbury were at 41 percent of market values, and the researchers could not find a nonracial explanation for the difference. In 1963, the city government broke ground on a new city hall and surrounding plaza in Scollay Square. In the same year, Collins and Edward Logue organized a consortium of savings banks, cooperatives, and federal and state savings and loan associations in the city called the Boston Banks Urban Renewal Group (B-BURG) that would provide $2.5 million in Federal Housing Administration (FHA) insured rehabilitation and home-ownership loans at less than 5.25% interest in Washington Park around Dudley Square in Roxbury. From 1968 through 1970, B-BURG would reverse redline census tracts in Dorchester, Roxbury, and Mattapan along Blue Hill Avenue.

In the mid-1960s, Carl Ericson, Vice President of the Suffolk Franklin Savings Bank (a B-BURG member institution), began making loans to white professionals in the South End, causing displacement of the decades-old local black population into North Dorchester. In 1964, the Congress of Racial Equality (CORE) organized 21 black families in the city's first rent strike, and in 1965, CORE distributed a list of property owners in the city in violation of state and city building codes. In the summer of 1967, FHA Executive Assistant Commissioner Edwin G. Callahan conducted a suitability tour for a 2,000-unit housing rehabilitation program in Roxbury called the Boston Rehabilitation Program (BURP). At a press conference at Freedom House in Roxbury on December 3, 1967, U.S. Secretary of Housing and Urban Development Robert C. Weaver announced the $24.5 million program. On March 20, 1968, a $996,000 FHA commitment was made through the Boston Rehabilitation Program (BURP) to the Sanders Associates (a housing development group created by Boston Celtics forward Tom Sanders in response to a search led by local energy business executive Eli Goldston) for the rehabilitation of 83 units in Roxbury after local community activists (including Mel King) criticized BURP for a lack of sufficient community control and racial equity.

=== Public housing ===
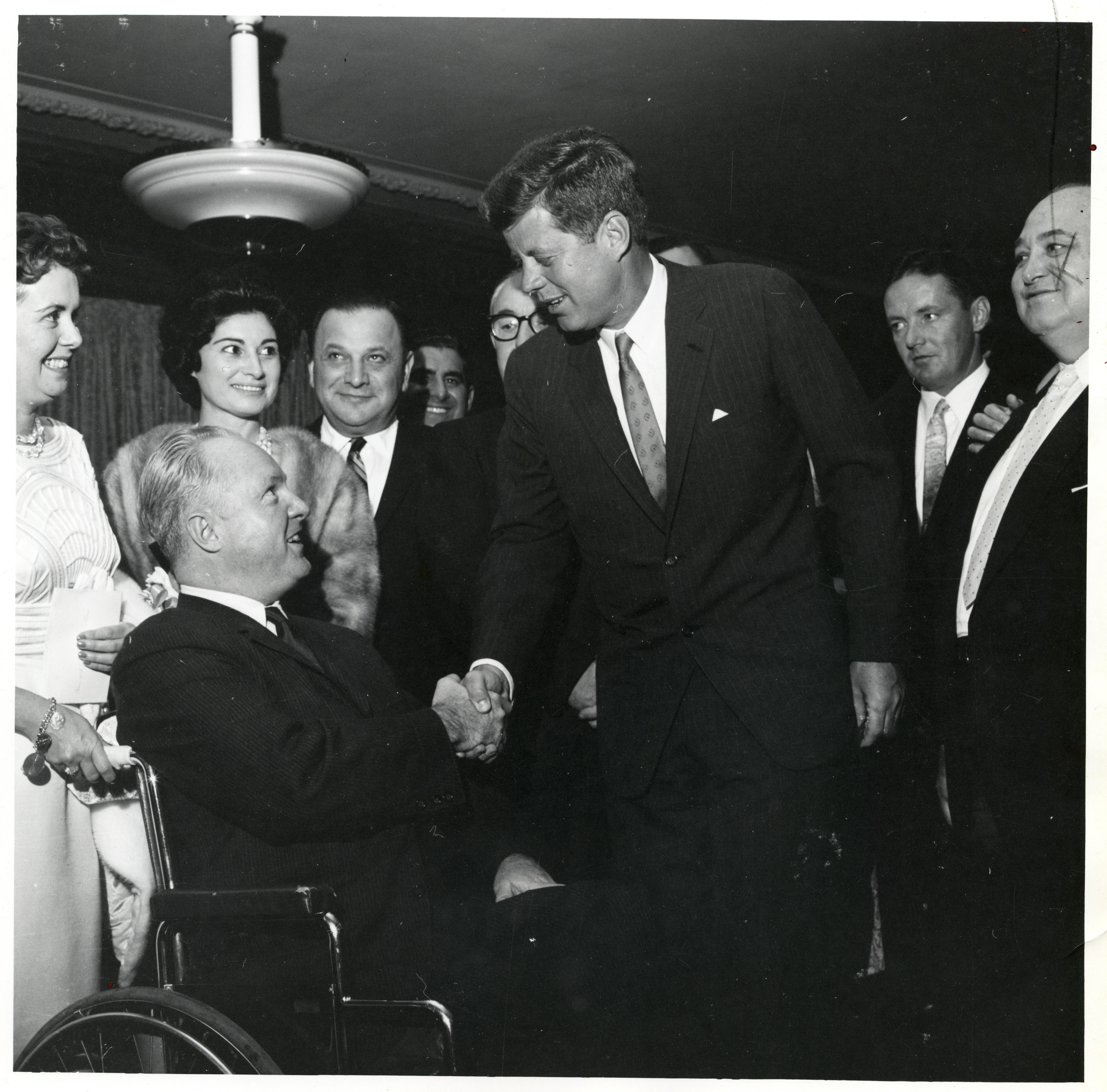
Collins with his wife and President John F. Kennedy (1961–1963). On November 20, 1962, President Kennedy issued Executive Order 11063 requiring all federal agencies to prevent racial discrimination in federally funded subsidized housing in the United States.

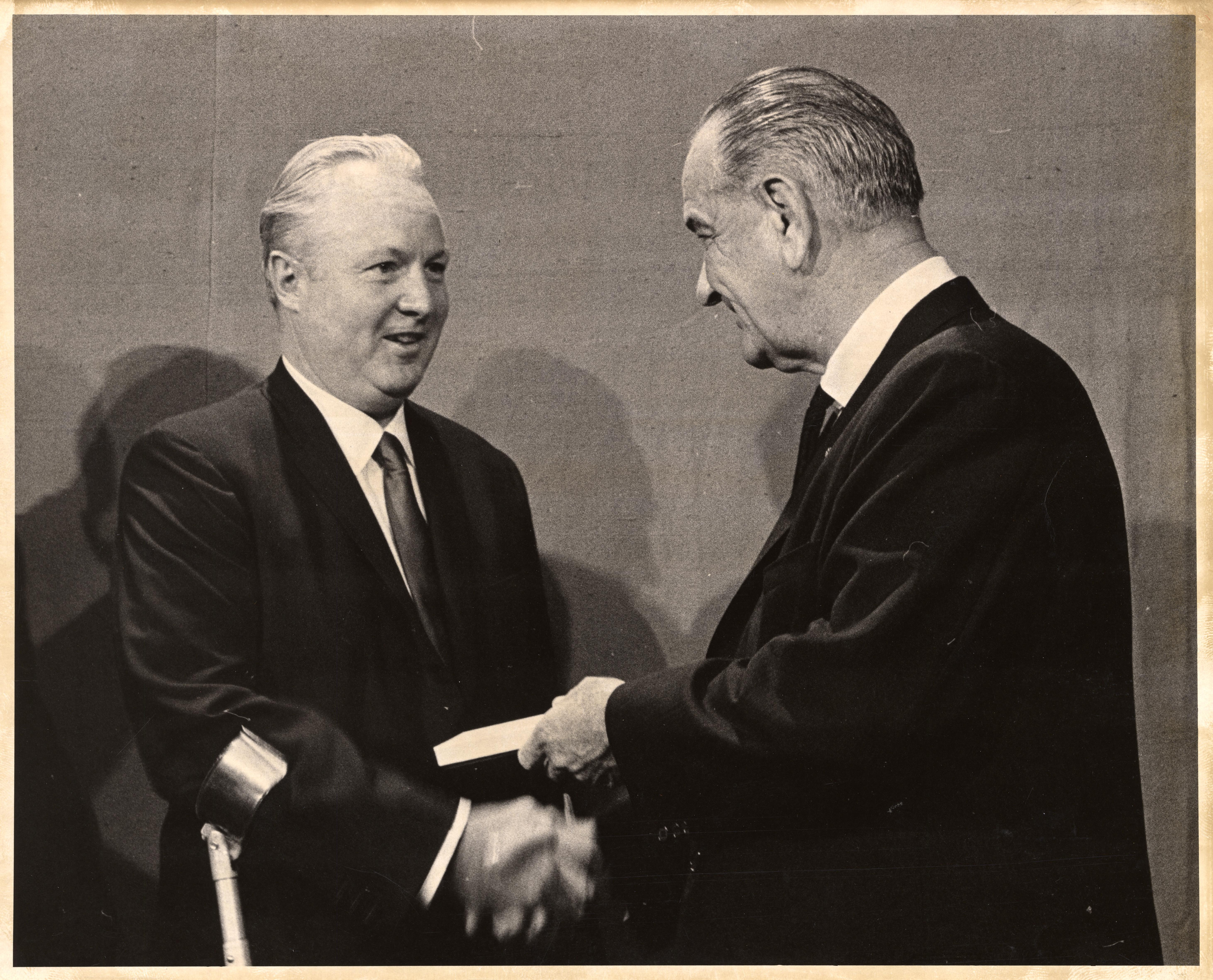
Collins with President Lyndon B. Johnson (1963–1969). On April 11, 1968, President Johnson signed into law the Civil Rights Act of 1968 including Titles VIII and IX introduced by Massachusetts U.S. Senator Edward Brooke prohibiting discrimination in the sale or rental of housing.

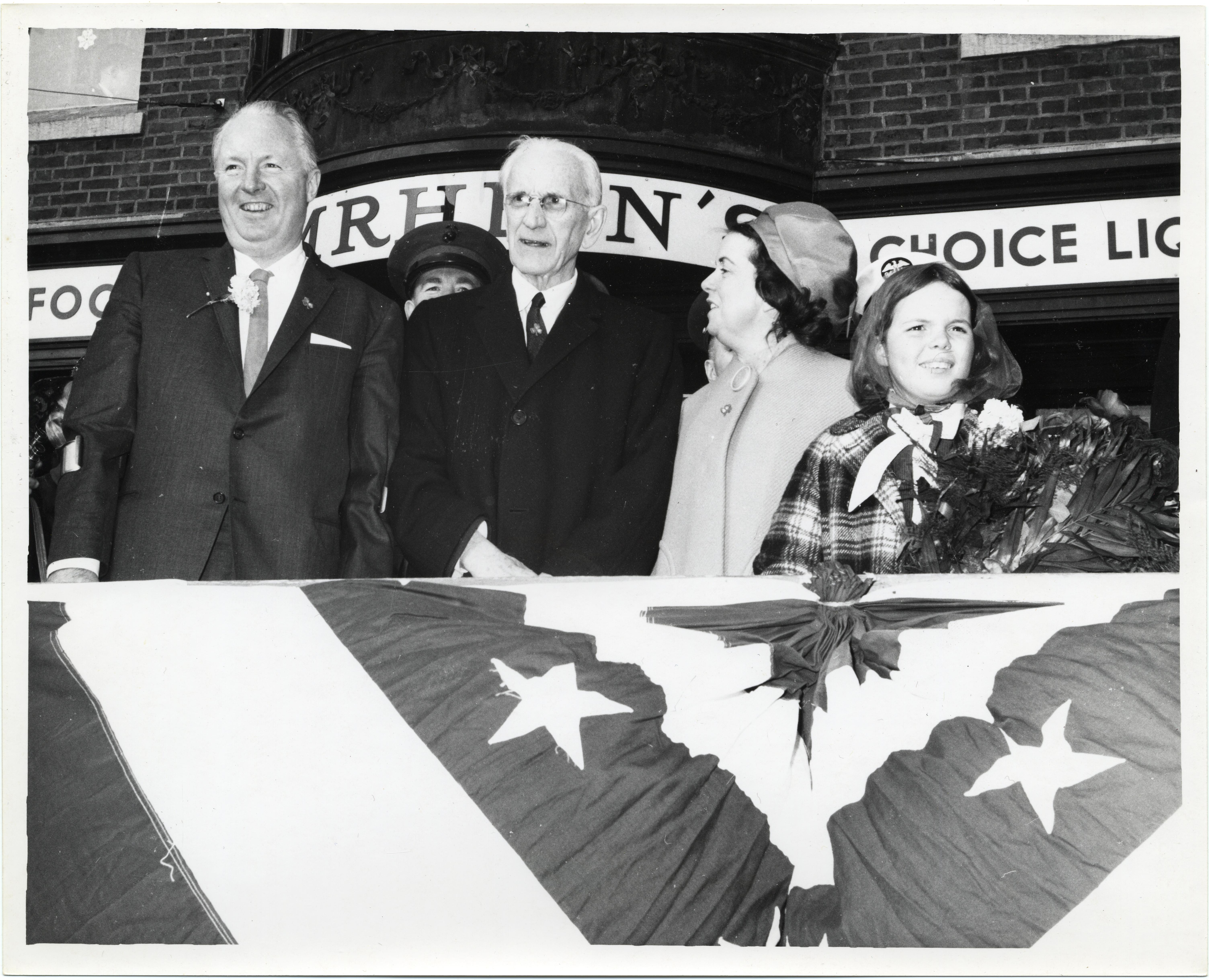
Collins with Speaker of the U.S. House of Representatives John W. McCormack (1962–1971) during a St. Patrick's Day parade in South Boston.

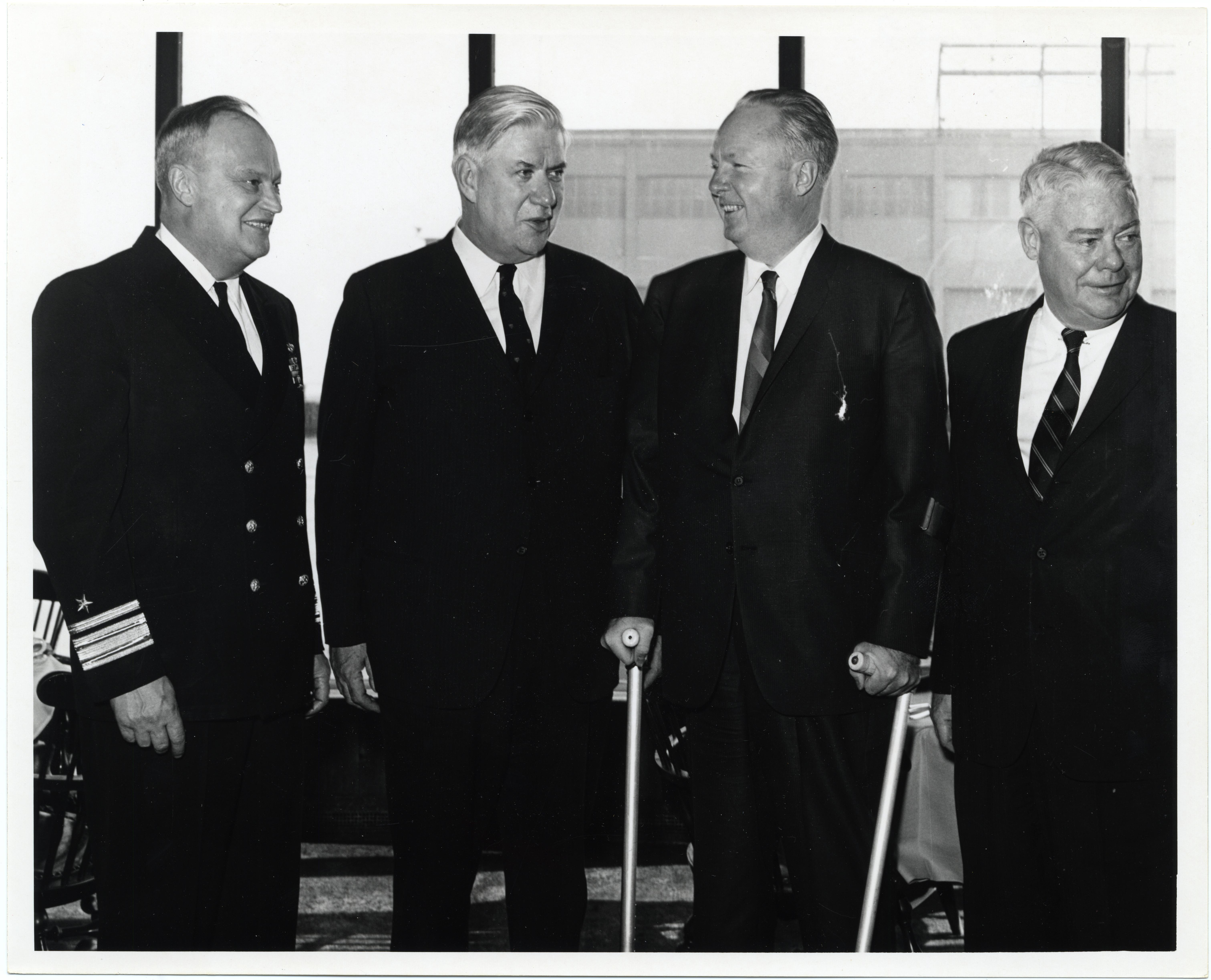
Collins with U.S. Representative Tip O'Neill from Massachusetts's 11th (1953–1963) and 8th congressional districts (1963–1987).

In May 1962, Boston NAACP President Melnea Cass filed a formal complaint with the Massachusetts Commission Against Discrimination alleging a pattern of discrimination in public housing in the city, citing that the Mission Hill Extension project went from 314 nonwhite families in 1957 to 492 nonwhite families of 572 units in 1961 while the Mission Hill project remained all-white. In the same year, upon receipt of a lawsuit filed by a civil rights group, the West Broadway Housing Development was desegregated after having been designated by the city for white-only occupancy since 1941. Despite the passage of legislation in 1950 by the 156th Massachusetts General Court prohibiting racial discrimination or segregation in housing, under Public Housing Administration regulations, a public housing authority could designate projects as integrated even if it housed only one nonwhite tenant.

In September 1962, 17 of the 25 public housing developments for families and all 5 elderly-only developments were collectively 99 percent white, while 4 of the 8 remaining family developments were 93 percent nonwhite and the other 4 located in Roxbury, the South End, Jamaica Plain, and Columbia Point were becoming increasingly nonwhite. When the Columbia Point development first opened in 1953, white tenants made up more than 90 percent of the population while black families made up approximately 7 percent, but by the early 1960s, white families started refusing assignment there and the Boston Housing Authority (BHA) reserved developments in South Boston for them instead, while moving black families to Columbia Point. Also in September 1962, the city's federally funded developments were highly segregated, and of the 3,686 state-funded units, only 129 were occupied by whites and two-thirds of nonwhites in state-sponsored units were living in an all-black development adjacent to the all-black Lenox Street Projects.

On November 20, 1962, President Kennedy issued Executive Order 11063 requiring all federal agencies to prevent racial discrimination in federally funded subsidized housing in the United States. On February 28, 1963, Collins met with President Kennedy at the White House. Despite continuing to make efforts to sustain segregation in the city's public housing developments, Collins appointed Ellis Ash, Edward Logue's deputy at the Boston Redevelopment Authority, to be the acting Administrator of the BHA in May 1963 and Ash later noted that though Collins opposed integration he believed it was inevitable. In 1964, all 852 Old Colony Housing Project units had white tenants, only 1 of the 1,010 Mission Hill units had a nonwhite tenant, while the Mission Hill Extension project had 509 nonwhite tenants of 580 units, and 220 of the 1,392 Columbia Point units had nonwhite tenants (or approximately 16 percent).

In 1967, the city government agreed to fully desegregate the Mission Hill and Mission Hill Extension developments, which were still 97 percent white and 98 percent black respectively, while 8 projects in the city as a whole remained more than 95 percent white and 5 others remained 90 percent white and nonwhites made up the majority of the waiting list. Despite Ellis Ash's appointment, the BHA Board Chair retained effective control over tenant assignment until 1968, and BHA Board Chair Edward Hassan (1960–1965), a Collins appointee, also opposed integration. Ash would continue to receive bureaucratic resistance against integration from the Board and BHA departments through at least 1966, as well as from state officials when attempting to desegregate the state's Chapter 200 public housing program in 1964.

Also in 1963, the Congress of Racial Equality requested comments from the BHA Board with allegations of discrimination by family composition and source of income in rejecting applications from mothers with illegitimate children or who were receiving Aid to Dependent Children (ADC) payments. The non-marital birthrate among whites and nonwhites nationally rose from 2 percent and 17 percent respectively in 1940 (5 years after ADC was created under the Social Security Act signed into law by President Franklin D. Roosevelt in 1935) to 4 percent and 26 percent respectively when the Moynihan Report was published in March 1965.

In November 1965, under new BHA chair Jacob Brier, the BHA adopted new Occupancy Standards to replace a set of 15 exclusionary criteria while continuing to allow the board to screen tenants using the previous criteria. Screened applications were referred to a Tenant and Community Relations Department staffed by social workers, and while the majority of the referrals remained for out-of-wedlock births, of the first 297 referrals the new department received only 14 (less than 5 percent) were denied. On April 11, 1968, President Lyndon B. Johnson signed into law the Civil Rights Act of 1968 including Titles VIII and IX introduced by Massachusetts U.S. Senator Edward Brooke prohibiting discrimination in the sale or rental of housing.

=== UMass Boston and Boston Public Schools ===
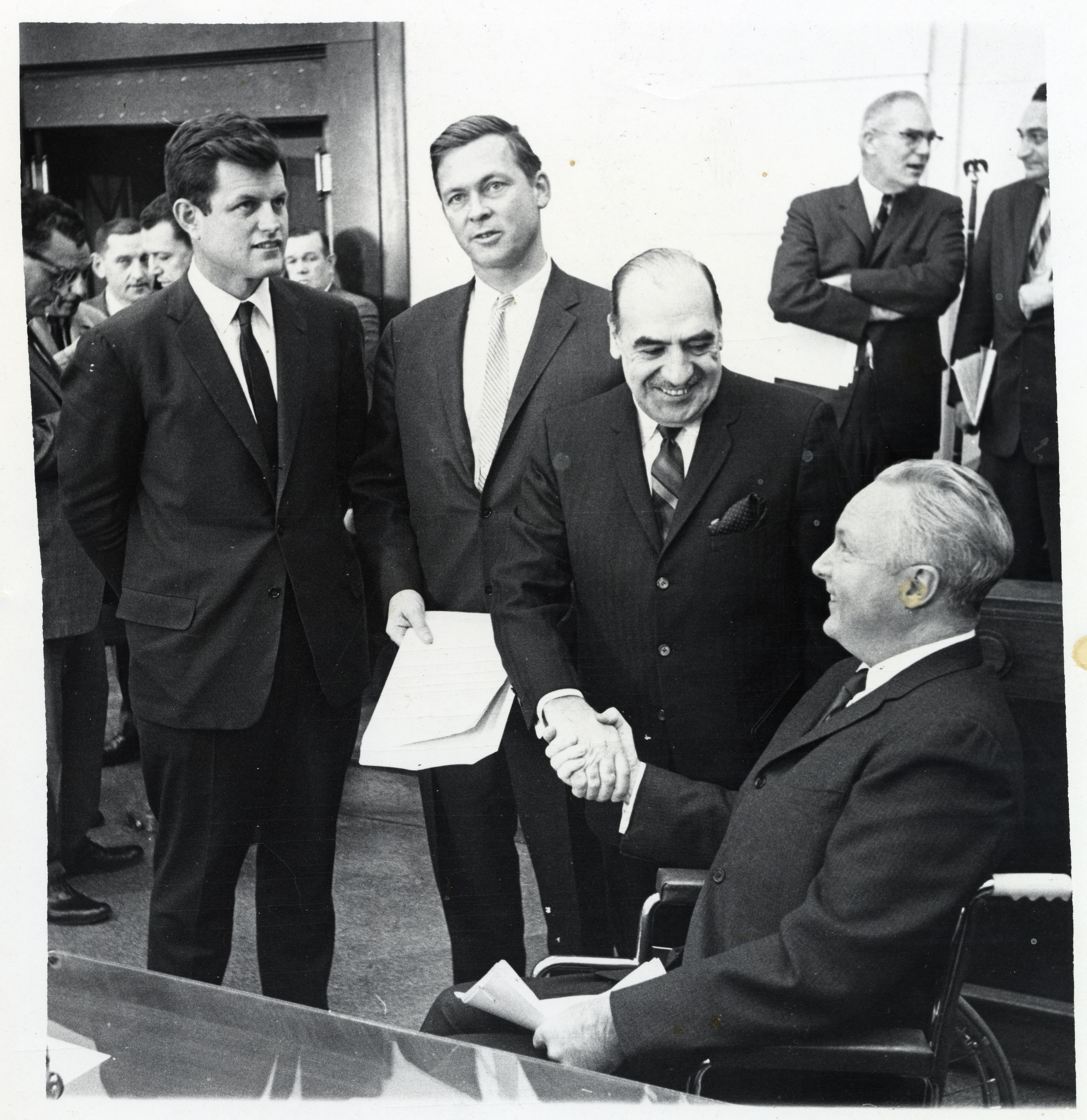
Collins with Massachusetts U.S. Senator Ted Kennedy (1962–2009) and Massachusetts Governor Endicott Peabody (1963–1965) in January 1964. On June 18, 1964, Governor Peabody signed into law the bill establishing the University of Massachusetts Boston.

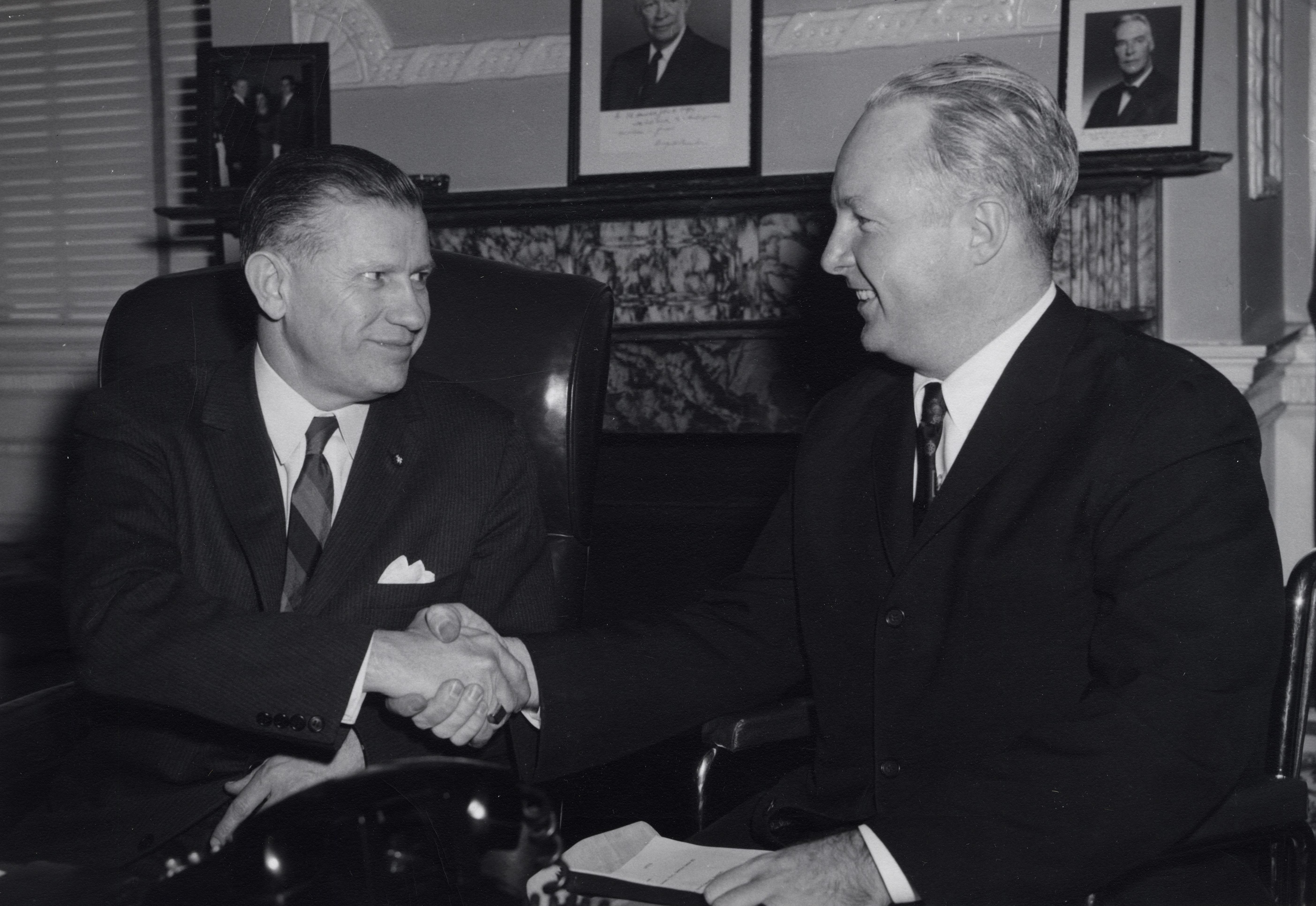
Collins with Massachusetts Governor John Volpe (1961–1963 & 1965–1969). In August 1965, Governor Volpe signed the Racial Imbalance Act of 1965 into law following the release of a report by a committee appointed by the Massachusetts Education Commissioner the previous April showing the Boston Public Schools to be racially imbalanced by housing segregation.

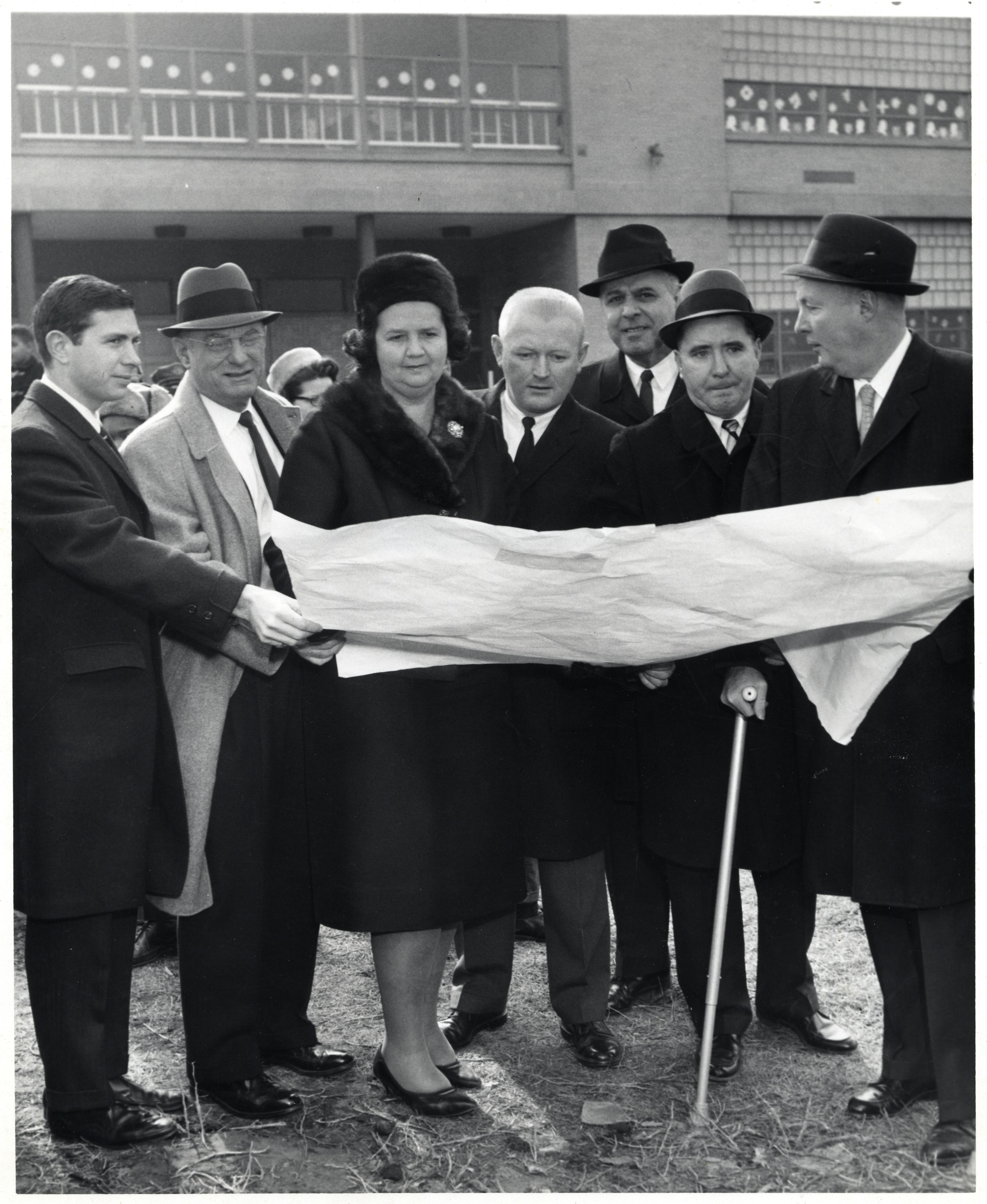
Collins with Boston School Committee Chair Louise Day Hicks (1963–1965).

On June 18, 1964, Massachusetts Governor Endicott Peabody signed into law the bill establishing the University of Massachusetts Boston, and in September 1965, undergraduate courses began at the former headquarters of the Boston Gas Company in Park Square. In August 1965, Collins publicly requested that UMass Boston Chancellor John W. Ryan not consider a permanent campus at its current site in Park Square or elsewhere in Downtown Boston (as a disproportionate amount of the real estate there was already owned by many colleges and other non-profit institutions exempt from the city government's property taxes), and to move to a suburban campus or one located in an underdeveloped section of Roxbury instead, while University of Massachusetts President John W. Lederle insisted on a campus inside the city limits.

In May 1966, following organized opposition from residents, Collins spoke with Chancellor Ryan and a proposal to locate the UMass Boston campus near Highland Park was cancelled. In 1967, the Boston Redevelopment Authority proposed locating the campus permanently at a former landfill on the Columbia Point peninsula closed in 1963. In response, in November 1967, 1,500 faculty and students organized a rally on Boston Common demanding a location in Copley Square. Over multiple counterproposals from Chancellors Ryan and Francis L. Broderick and at the public urging of Speaker of the Massachusetts House of Representatives Robert H. Quinn, Massachusetts Senate Majority Leader Kevin B. Harrington, and State Senator George V. Kenneally Jr., the UMass Board of Trustees voted 12 to 4 to accept the Columbia Point campus proposal from the BRA in December 1968 and the university would move to the campus in January 1974.

On April 1, 1965, a special committee appointed by Massachusetts Education Commissioner Owen Kiernan released its final report finding that more than half of black students enrolled in Boston Public Schools (BPS) attended institutions with enrollments that were at least 80 percent black and that housing segregation in the city had caused the racial imbalance. From its creation under the National Housing Act of 1934 signed into law by President Franklin D. Roosevelt, the Federal Housing Administration used its official mortgage insurance underwriting policy explicitly to prevent school desegregation. In response, on April 20, the Boston NAACP filed a lawsuit in federal district court against the city seeking the desegregation of the city's public schools. Massachusetts Governor John Volpe filed a request for legislation from the state legislature that defined schools with nonwhite enrollments greater than 50 percent to be imbalanced and granted the State Board of Education the power to withhold state funds from any school district in the state that was found to have racial imbalance, which Volpe would sign into law the following August.

Also in August 1965, along with Governor Volpe and BPS Superintendent William H. Ohrenberger, Collins opposed and warned the Boston School Committee that a vote that they held that month to abandon a proposal to bus several hundred blacks students from Roxbury and North Dorchester from three overcrowded schools to nearby schools in Dorchester and Brighton, and purchase an abandoned Hebrew school in Dorchester to relieve the overcrowding instead, could now be held by a court to be deliberate acts of segregation. Pursuant to the Racial Imbalance Act, the state conducted a racial census and found 55 imbalanced schools in the state with 46 in Boston, and in October 1965, the State Board required the School Committee to submit a desegregation plan, which the School Committee did the following December.

In April 1966, the State Board found the plan inadequate and voted to rescind state aid to the district, and in response, the School Committee filed a lawsuit against the State Board challenging both the decision and the constitutionality of the Racial Imbalance Act the following August. In January 1967, the Massachusetts Superior Court overturned a Suffolk Superior Court ruling that the State Board had improperly withdrawn the funds and ordered the School Committee to submit an acceptable plan to the State Board within 90 days or else permanently lose funding, which the School Committee did shortly thereafter and the State Board accepted. In June 1967, the Massachusetts Supreme Judicial Court upheld the constitutionality of the Racial Imbalance Act and the U.S. Supreme Court under Chief Justice Earl Warren (1953–1969) declined to hear the School Committee's appeal in January 1968.

=== Grove Hall riots and race relations ===
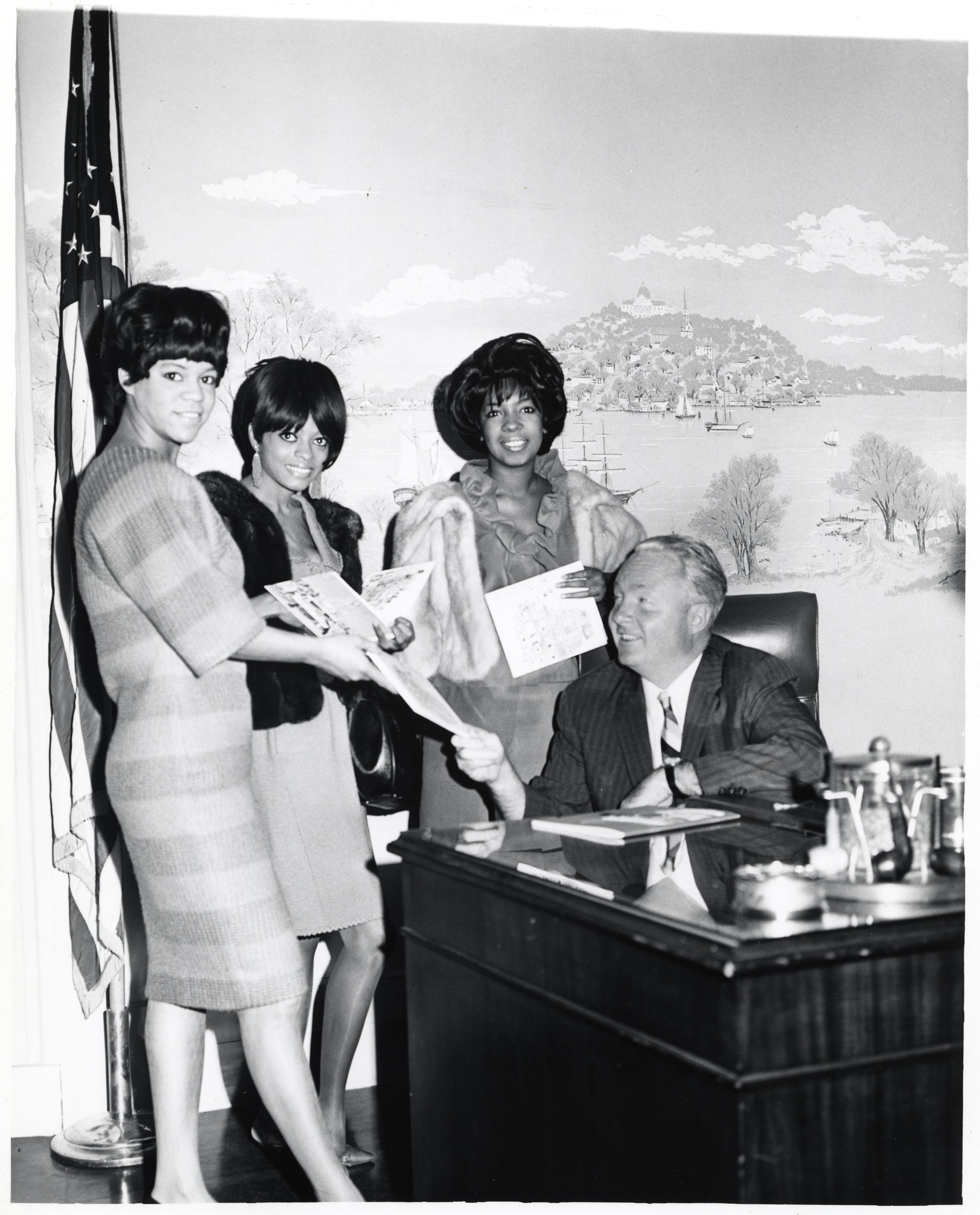
Collins with The Supremes, L–R: Florence Ballard, Diana Ross, and Mary Wilson (ca. 1966)

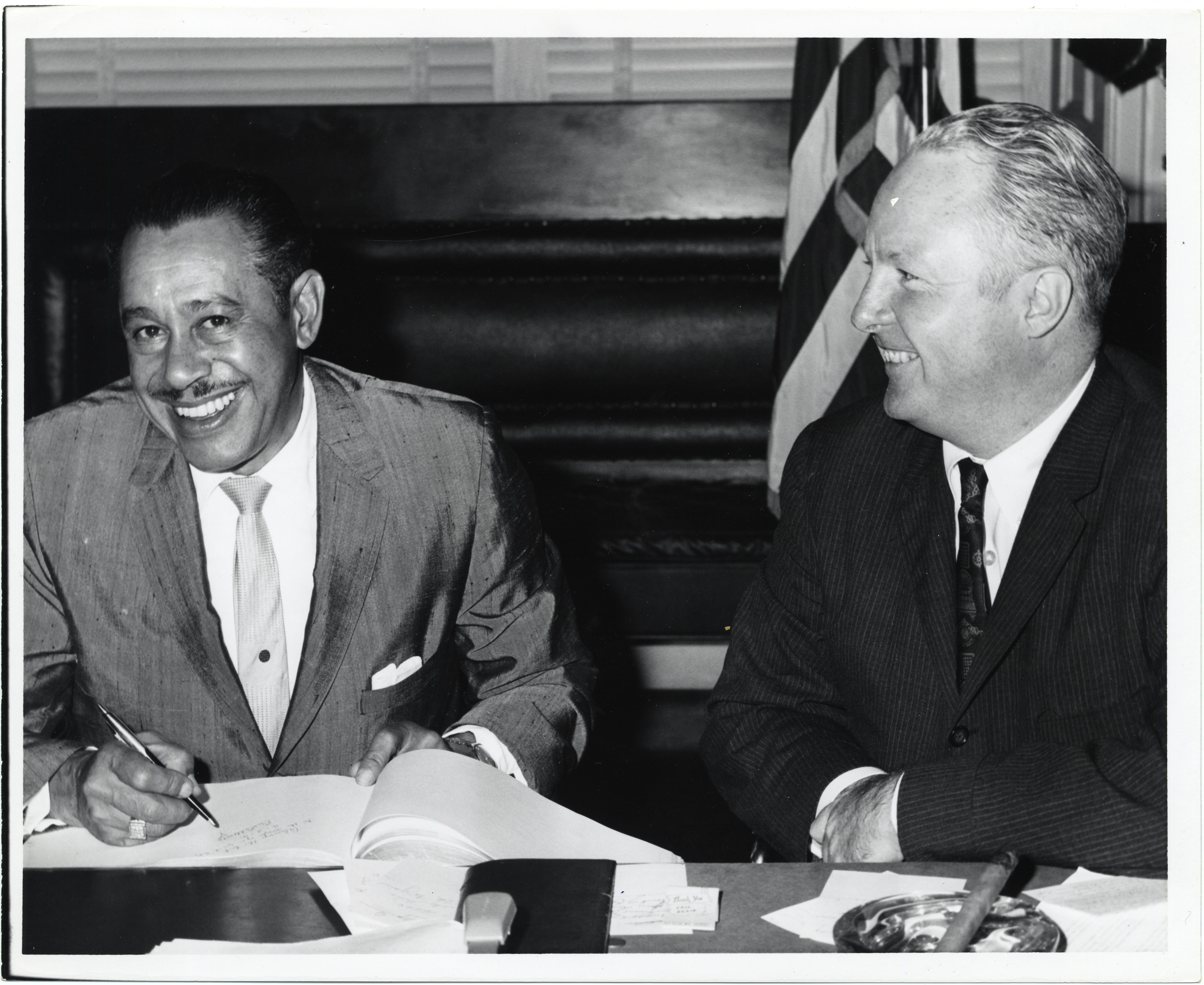
Collins with Cab Calloway.

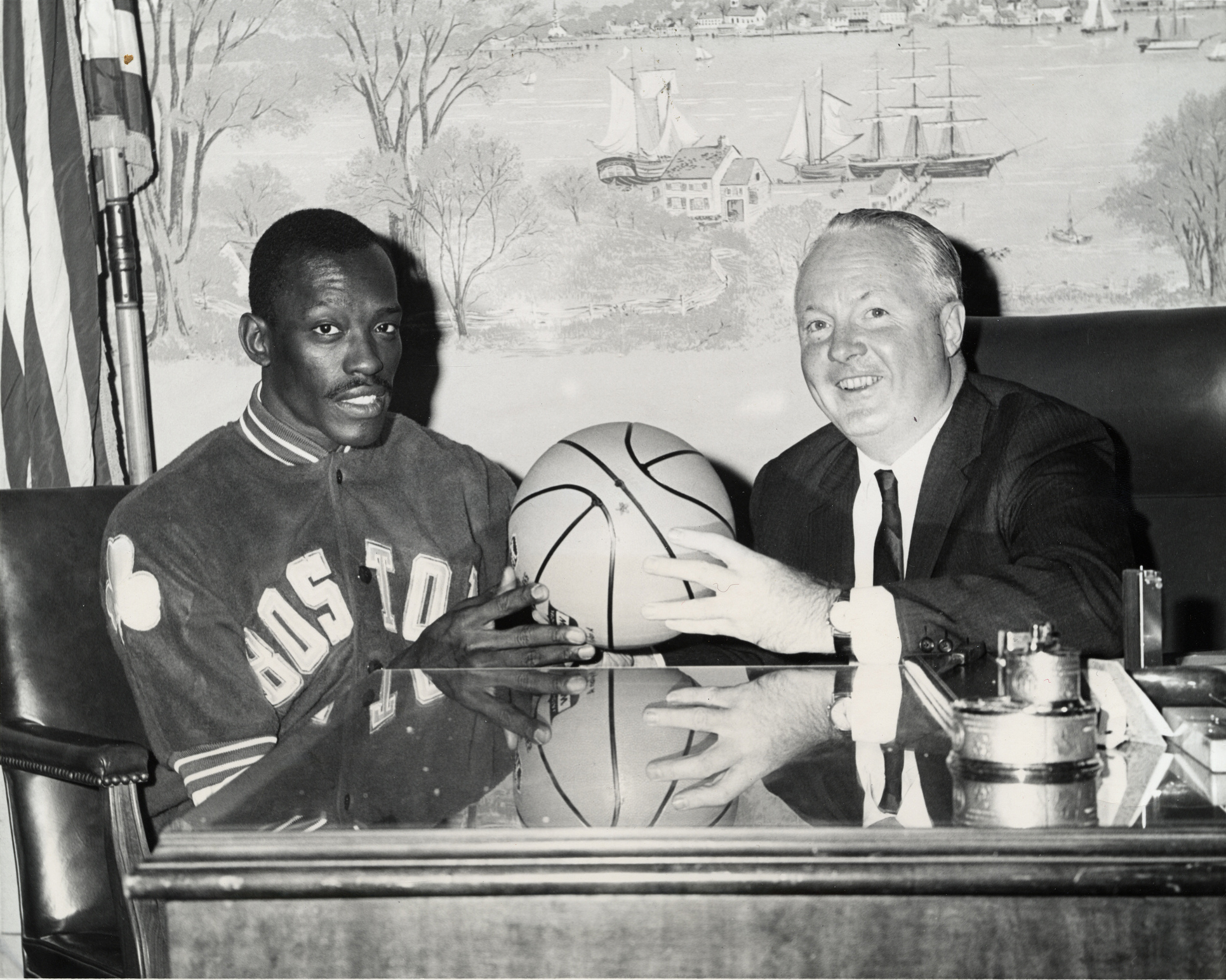
Collins with Boston Celtics forward Tom Sanders. On March 20, 1968, a housing development group created by Sanders received a $996,000 FHA commitment through the Boston Rehabilitation Program (BURP) for the rehabilitation of 83 units in Roxbury.

In April 1962, Collins's administrative staff described protests in Columbia Point following a six-year-old girl being run over and killed by a dump truck operated by a negligent city government employee as "interracial riots." In response to the Boston NAACP complaint in May 1962 to the Massachusetts Commission Against Discrimination, the Boston Housing Authority rented a single apartment to an elderly black woman in the Mission Hill development which was stoned over two consecutive nights, and Collins aides scuttled a formal probe of the incident by the Massachusetts Attorney General's office. Amidst growing urban race rioting in the United States, in December 1965, the American Sociological Review published a survey conducted by sociologists Stanley Lieberson and Arnold R. Silverman of 76 black–white race riots in the United States from 1913 to 1963 and found that riots were more common in cities with smaller percentages of blacks who were store owners, smaller proportions of blacks on the city police force relative to the local black population, and where the population per city councilor was larger or where city councilors were elected at-large rather than by ward.

In 1949, an amendment to the city charter reduced membership on the Boston City Council from 22 seats elected by ward down to 9 seats elected by citywide at-large elections, and in 1951, the only African American sitting on the City Council, Laurence H. Banks of Roxbury (a former member of the Massachusetts House of Representatives) lost re-election, and no African Americans would serve on the City Council until the election of Thomas Atkins in 1967. From 1960 to 1970, the ratio of Boston's population that was black grew from 9 percent to 16 percent, as part of the second wave of the African-American Great Migration (1916–1970), while the total population of the city declined from approximately 697,000 to 641,000. As late as 1970, less than 3 percent of Boston Police Department officers were black, and 70 percent of black men in the city were employed as manual workers in comparison to slightly less than half of white men, and as in 1950, black men earned only three-quarters of what their white counterparts did.

On January 15, 1961, American Nazi Party founder George Lincoln Rockwell and a fellow Nazi Party member attempted to picket the local premiere of the film Exodus at the Saxon Theatre on Tremont Street in Downtown Boston while staying at the Hotel Touraine across the street. After Collins declined to deny Rockwell the right to picket, members of the local Jewish community organized a counterdemonstration of 2,000 protestors in response on the corner of Tremont and Boylston Streets on the day of the premiere, which forced police to converge on the theater and force Rockwell into a police cruiser that took him to Logan International Airport where Rockwell was then boarded onto a flight to Washington, DC. On April 23, 1965, after leading a march from Roxbury to Boston Common and giving speeches at both locations, Rev. Martin Luther King Jr. met with Collins in an informal after-hours meeting along with Rev. Ralph Abernathy and Rev. Virgil Wood (the regional representative of the Southern Christian Leadership Conference and former pastor at the Diamond Hill Baptist Church in Lynchburg, Virginia). On May 22, 1966, Collins declared the 142nd day of the year as "Melnea Cass Day" in the city in honor of Boston NAACP President Melnea Cass.

On April 26, 1965, the recently formed Mothers for Adequate Welfare (MAW) organized a sit-in at the Welfare Department Office on Hawkins Street, marched on the Massachusetts State House in July 1966 and organized a subsequent sit-in at a welfare office on Blue Hill Avenue on May 26, 1967. On Friday, June 2, during a summer when 159 race riots occurred across the United States, 25 white and black MAW members and a contingent of college students arrived at the Grove Hall welfare office at 4:20 PM, presented a list of 10 demands, and chained the doors from the inside, preventing 58 office employees from leaving. At 4:45 PM, fire and police arrived while a crowd grew outside, and upon receiving a call that an office worker was having heart trouble, Collins ordered the police to enter by any means possible, remove the workers, and arrest the protestors.

By 5:30 PM, police had entered the rear of the facility, and a woman appeared at a window screaming that the police were beating people inside. By 8:10 PM, the police had emptied the building, while the crowd had begun throwing missiles at the police and then migrated from Grove Hall across nearly 15 blocks of Blue Hill Avenue. By 9:30 PM, 30 people had been seriously injured and more than $500,000 in property damage had been committed. By 4:30 AM, arsonists had destroyed two buildings (with damage estimated at $50,000), police had made 44 arrests, and the injured numbered 45. The following morning, Saturday, June 3, MAW stated that a deputy superintendent said, "get them, beat them, use clubs if you have to, but get them out of here," with one mother described being "beaten, kicked, dragged, abused, insulted and brutalized" by police who used "vulgar language" and repeated the word "nigger," while Deputy Superintendent William A. Bradley stated, "The demonstrators refused to move. … As officers tried to break in, they were kicked, beaten, thrown to the floor and cut with glass."

Collins called the demonstration, "the worst manifestation of disrespect for the rights of others that this city has ever seen." Collins ordered the Boston Police Department to close all bars and liquor stores on Blue Hill Avenue, but by 10:30 PM, fire alarms were being falsely set off, and unplanned spontaneous outbursts of violence occurred among roving gangs in Roxbury through the night. On the evening of Sunday, June 4, 1,900 police were called in to quell further rioting and looting in the Grove Hall area, making 11 arrests, and with 11 more being injured. On Monday, June 5, violence began subsiding with only sporadic outbursts, and on Tuesday, June 6, 60 fire alarms were falsely set off while no violence occurred. Collins and the Boston Police Department attributed the violence to a criminal element among the rioters rather than race relations in the city.

=== 1966 U.S. Senate campaign ===
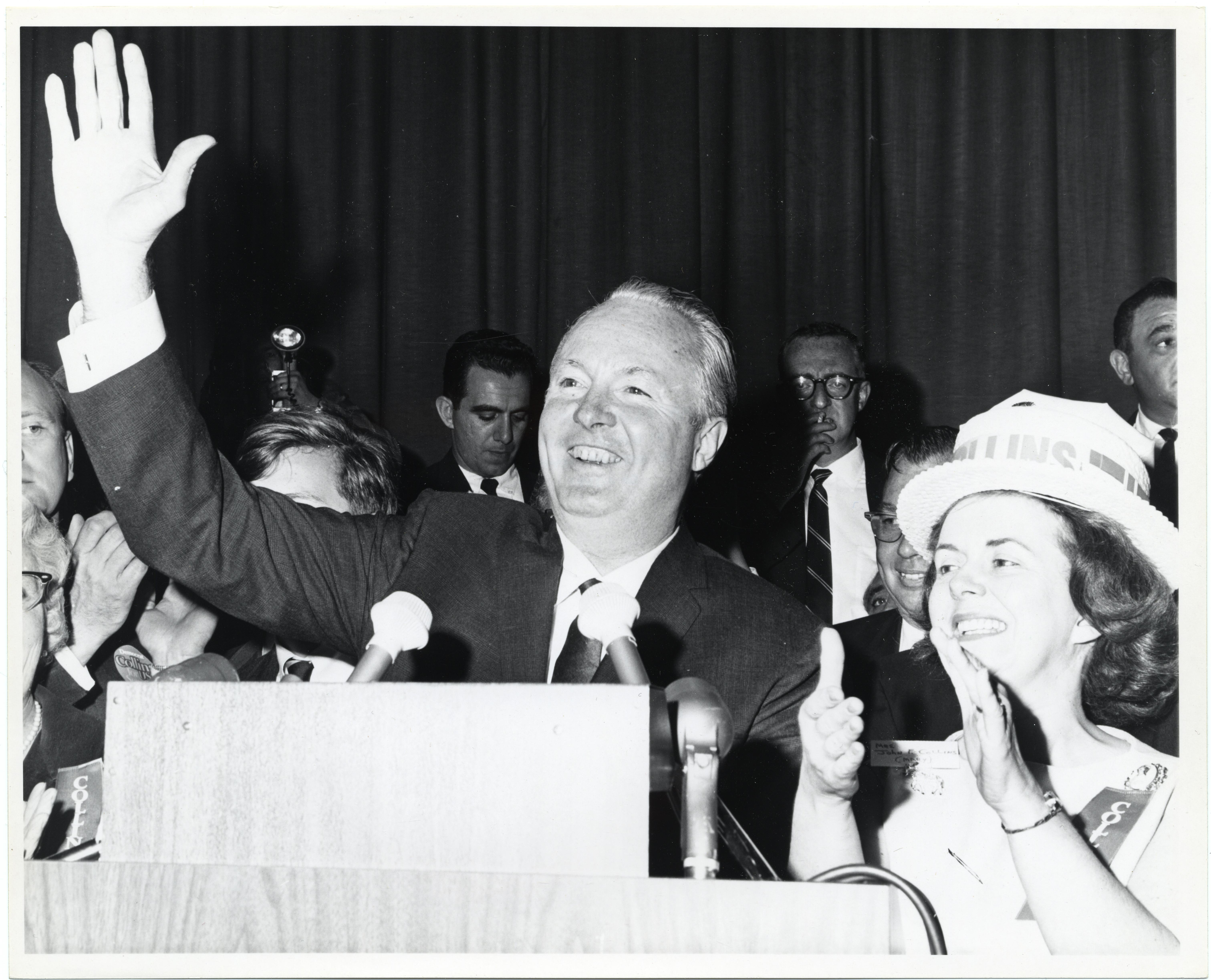
Collins and his wife at an event for Collins's U.S. Senate campaign

In 1966, Collins ran for the United States Senate seat being vacated by the retiring former Senate Republican Conference Whip Leverett Saltonstall, but lost in the primary to former Massachusetts Governor Endicott Peabody (who in turn would lose to Massachusetts Attorney General Edward Brooke). Despite receiving 42 percent of the vote statewide, Collins lost 21 out of Boston's 22 wards. Weakened politically, Collins declined to seek reelection in 1967 and was succeeded by Massachusetts Secretary of the Commonwealth Kevin White.

== Retirement and legacy ==
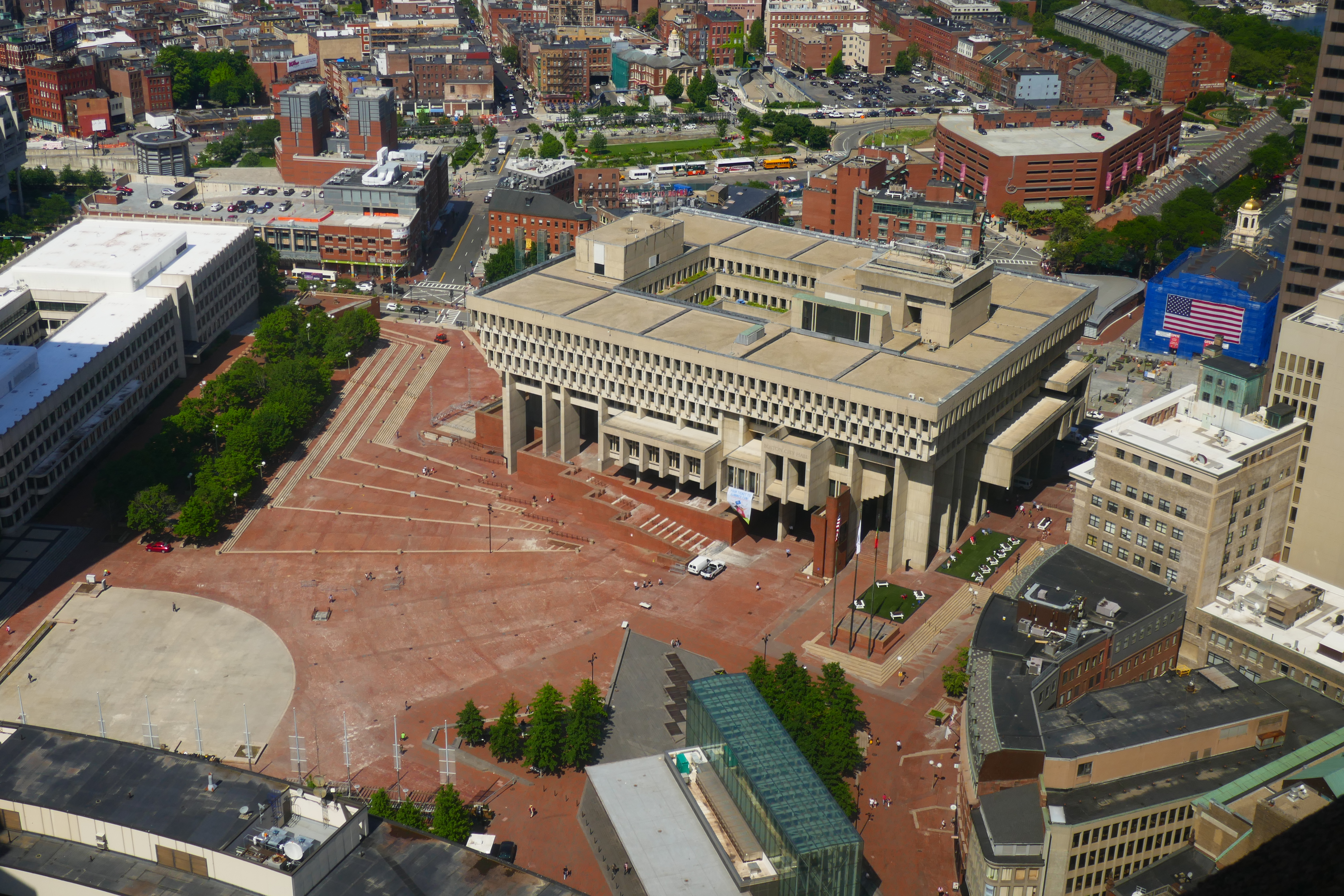
Boston City Hall Plaza was dedicated to Collins in 2002.

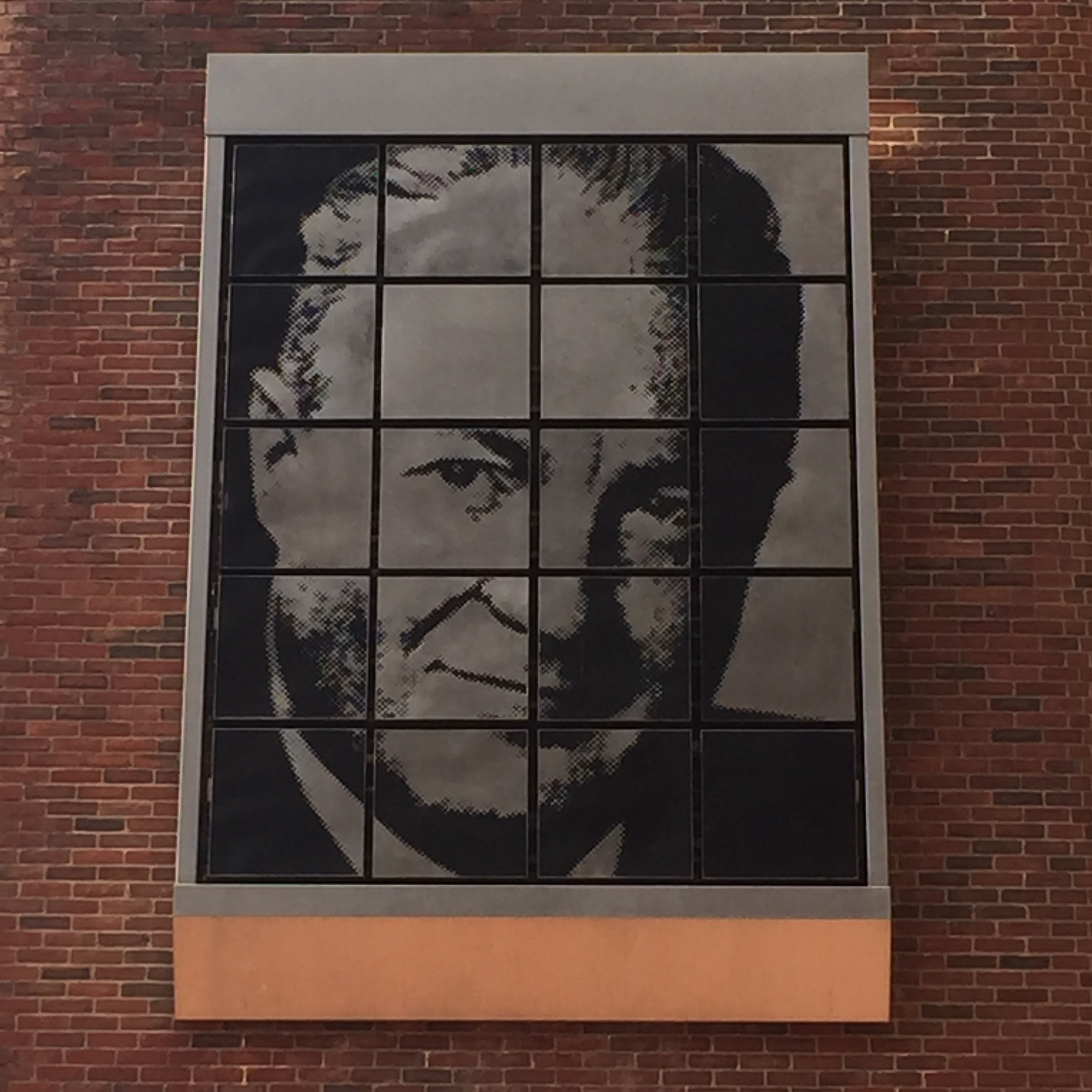
Mural of Collins commissioned in 2004 on Boston City Hall's exterior by Government Center station.

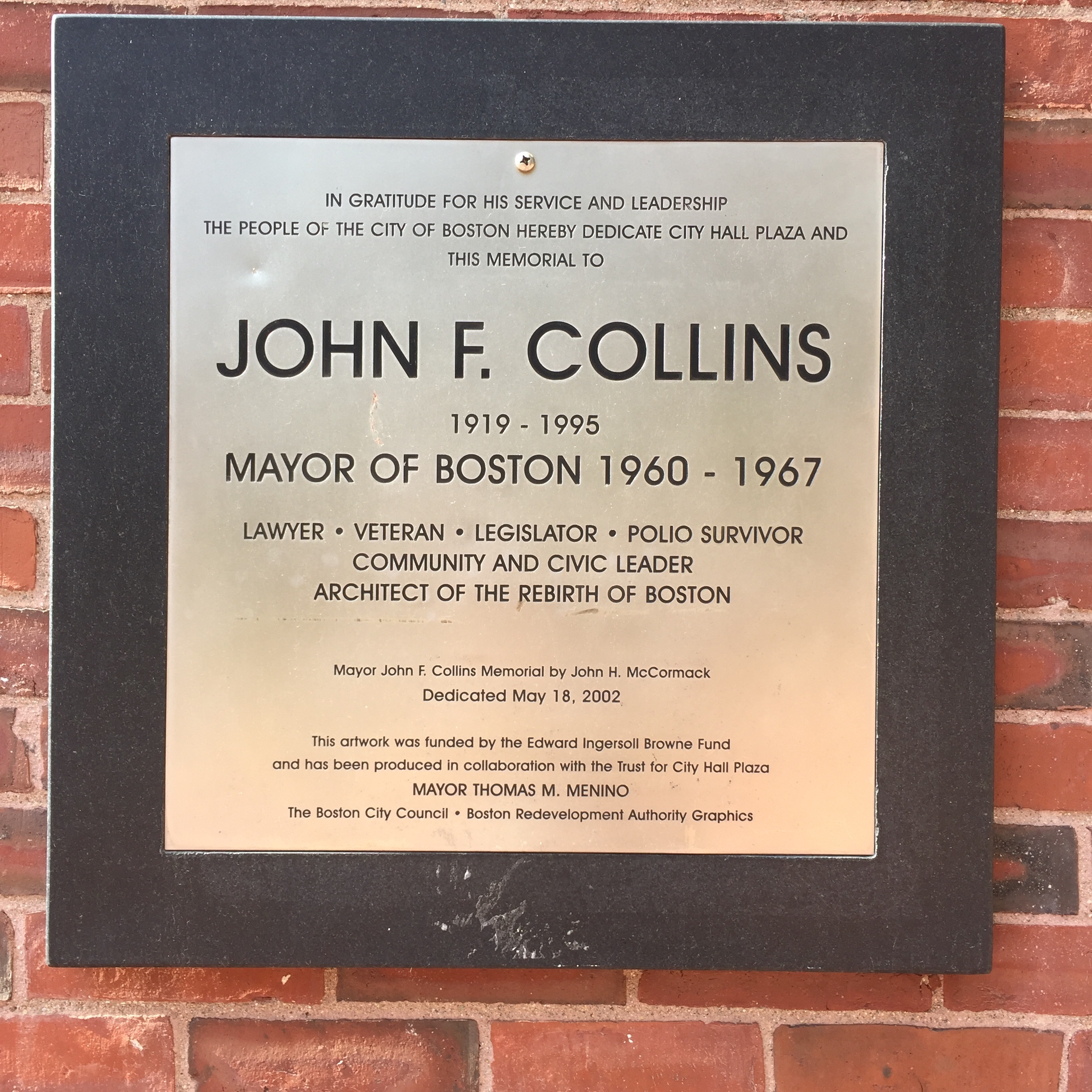
Mural marker.

After leaving office in 1968, Collins held visiting and consulting professorships at the Massachusetts Institute of Technology for 13 years. In the early 1970s, Collins drifted away from the Democratic Party. He chaired the group Massachusetts Democrats and Independents for Nixon and, in 1972, attacked Democrats for "their crazy policies of social engineering and abortion." Collins was considered for the position of Secretary of Commerce in the Nixon administration.

== Death and burial ==
Collins died of pneumonia in Boston, on November 23, 1995. Five days later, he was buried at St. Joseph Cemetery in West Roxbury following a funeral Mass at Boston's Holy Cross Cathedral celebrated by Cardinal Bernard Francis Law, Archbishop of Catholic Archdiocese of Boston (1984–2002). The Associated Press obituary noted that the urban renewal policies Collins implemented in Boston were emulated across the United States. In 2004, the city government commissioned a mural of Collins on the exterior of Boston City Hall adjacent to Government Center station and dedicated City Hall Plaza to him as well.

== See also ==
- Timeline of Boston, 1960s

== Bibliography ==
- Feldberg, Michael (2015). UMass Boston at 50: A Fiftieth-Anniversary History of the University of Massachusetts Boston. Amherst, MA: University of Massachusetts Press. ISBN 978-1625341693.
- Formisano, Ronald P. (2004) [1991]. Boston Against Busing: Race, Class, and Ethnicity in the 1960s and 1970s. Chapel Hill, NC: University of North Carolina Press. ISBN 978-0807855263.
- Levine, Hillel; Harmon, Lawrence (1992). The Death of an American Jewish Community: A Tragedy of Good Intentions. New York: Free Press. ISBN 978-0029138656.
- Rothstein, Richard (2017). The Color of Law: A Forgotten History of How Our Government Segregated America. New York: Liveright Publishing Corporation. ISBN 978-1631494536.
- Tager, Jack (2001). Boston Riots: Three Centuries of Social Violence. Boston: Northeastern University Press. ISBN 978-1555534615.
- Vale, Lawrence J. (2000). From the Puritans to the Projects: Public Housing and Public Neighbors. Cambridge, MA: Harvard University Press. ISBN 978-0674025752.

Party political offices
Preceded by Francis E. Kelly	Democratic nominee for Attorney General of Massachusetts; 1954	Succeeded by Edward J. McCormack Jr.
Political offices
Preceded by John Hynes	Mayor of Boston; 1960–1968	Succeeded by Kevin White
