= St. Joseph Cemetery (West Roxbury, Massachusetts) =

Cemetery in Massachusetts, United States

Coordinates: 42.293°N 71.173°W

- Interactive map of St. Joseph Cemetery

Details
- Established: 1888
- Location: West Roxbury, Massachusetts
- Size: 200 acres (81 ha)

In 1888 the directors of the Holyhood Cemetery Association purchased land in West Roxbury to develop St. Joseph Cemetery. At about 200 acres (81 ha), St. Joseph is one of the largest cemeteries in New England.

In 1950, the Directors of Holyhood 1950 opened a new section on VFW Parkway called St. James the Apostle. Extensive landscape improvements have been carried out over the last ten years, and the main cemetery is almost fully developed.

The cemetery contains two British Commonwealth war graves of a Canadian Army Private from each of the two World Wars.

== Notable burials ==
- Whitey Bulger (1929–2018), American organized crime boss, gangster, and FBI informant
- Jeremiah E. Burke (1867–1931), superintendent of Boston Public Schools
- John F. Collins (1919–1995), Massachusetts State Representative (1947–51), Massachusetts State Senator (1951–55), Mayor of Boston (1960–68)
- Mary Collins (1920–2010), first lady of Boston (1960–68)
- Paul A. Dever (1903–1958), Governor of Massachusetts and Massachusetts Attorney General
- John Joseph Douglass (1873–1939), Massachusetts State Representative (1899, 1900, 1906, and 1913), member of the United States House of Representatives from Massachusetts (1925–35)
- Arthur Fiedler (1894–1979), American conductor known for his association with both the Boston Symphony and Boston Pops orchestras
- John Francis "Honey Fitz" Fitzgerald (1863–1950), member of the United States House of Representatives from Massachusetts (1895–1901), Mayor of Boston (1906–08), grandfather and namesake of U.S. President John F. Kennedy
- Louise Day Hicks (1916–2003), member of the United States House of Representatives from Massachusetts (1971–73), President of the Boston City Council (1976)
- John Patrick Higgins (1893–1955), Massachusetts State Representative (1929–34), member of the United States House of Representatives from Massachusetts (1935–37)
- John Bernard Hynes (1897–1970), Mayor of Boston (1950–60), President of the United States Conference of Mayors (1955–57)
- Gregory Eric “Greg” Kelley (1944–1961), American figure skater
- John Joseph “Jack” Kirrane Jr. (1928–2016), American ice hockey player
- John William McCormack (1891–1980), Massachusetts State Representative (1920–22), Massachusetts State Senator (1923–28), member of the United States House of Representatives from Massachusetts (1928–71), Speaker of the United States House of Representatives (1962–71)
- William Sarsfield McNary (1863–1930), Massachusetts State Senator (1889–90, 1891–92), Chairperson of the Massachusetts Democratic Party (1901–04), Massachusetts State Representative (1900–02), member of the United States House of Representatives from Massachusetts (1903–07)
- Joseph Francis O'Connell (1872–1942), member of the United States House of Representatives from Massachusetts (1907–11)
- H. James Shea Jr. (1939–1970), Massachusetts State Representative (1969–70) and anti-war activist
- William Joseph Stewart (1895–1964), American coach and sports official who was a referee in the National Hockey League (NHL) and an umpire in Major League Baseball (MLB), inductee of the United States Hockey Hall of Fame
- William Sweeney (1886–1948), infielder in Major League Baseball (1907–14)
- Kevin Hagan White (1929–2012), Massachusetts Secretary of the Commonwealth (1961–67), Mayor of Boston (1968–84)

== See also ==
- List of cemeteries in Boston, Massachusetts
