= 1959 Boston mayoral election =

Election in Massachusetts, United States

- November 3, 1959
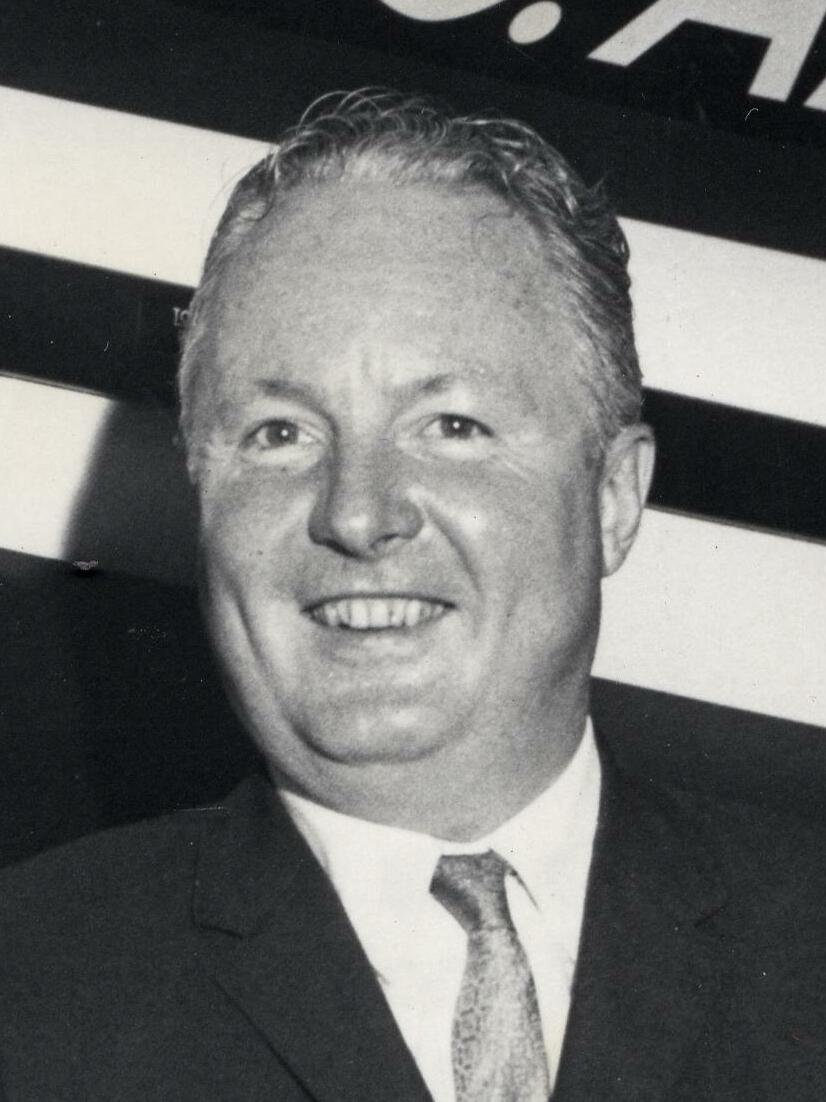

Candidate	John F. Collins	John E. Powers
Party	Nonpartisan	Nonpartisan
Popular vote	114,210	90,142
Percentage	55.89%	44.11%
- Results by ward Collins: 50–60% 60–70% Powers: 50–60% 60–70% 70–80%
Mayor before election
John B. Hynes
Elected mayor
John F. Collins

The Boston mayoral election of 1959 occurred on Tuesday, November 3, 1959, between former Boston City Council member John Frederick Collins and President of the Massachusetts Senate John E. Powers. Collins was elected to his first term, and was inaugurated on Monday, January 4, 1960.

The nonpartisan municipal preliminary election was held on Tuesday, September 22, 1959.

Collins' victory was considered the biggest upset victory in city politics in decades. Boston University political scientist Murray Levin wrote a book on the race, titled The Alienated Voter: Politics in Boston, which attributed Collins' victory to the voters' cynicism and resentment of the city's political elite. Collins had been widely viewed as the underdog in the race and Powers had been regarded as the front-runner, making Collins' victory a political surprise. Collins had run on the slogan "stop power politics", and was widely seen as independent of any political machine.

== Candidates ==
- John F. Collins, member of the Boston City Council from 1956 to 1957, member of the Massachusetts Senate from 1951 to 1955
- John E. Powers, member of the Massachusetts Senate since 1940, Massachusetts senate president since 1959

=== Candidates eliminated in preliminary ===
- James W. Hennigan Jr., member of the Massachusetts Senate since 1955 and the Massachusetts House of Representatives from 1953 to 1955
- John P. McMorrow, member of the Boston School Committee
- Gabriel F. Piemonte, member of the Boston City Council since 1952 to 1959

== Results ==
Candidates	Preliminary Election		General Election	
Candidates	Votes	%	Votes	%
John F. Collins	28,489	21.87	114,210	55.89
John E. Powers	44,079	33.84	90,142	44.11
Gabriel F. Piemonte	25,850	19.85		
James W. Hennigan, Jr.	19,742	15.16		
John P. McMorrow	12,100	9.29		

== See also ==
- List of mayors of Boston, Massachusetts
