= 1966 United States Senate election in Massachusetts =

- November 8, 1966
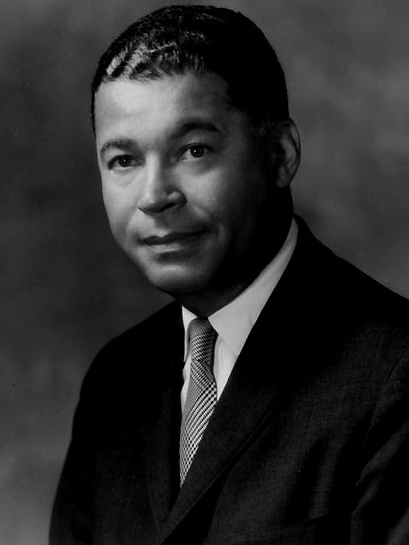

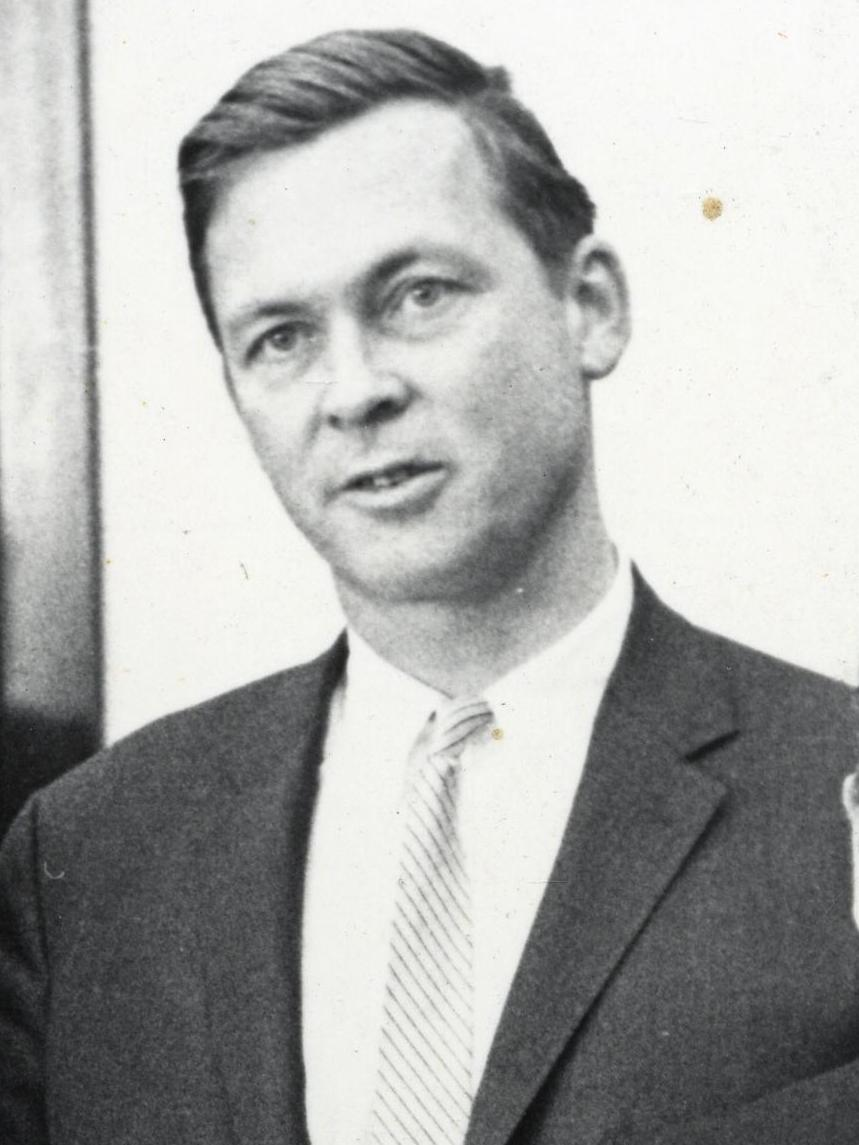
| Nominee | Edward Brooke | Endicott Peabody |
| Party | Republican | Democratic |
| Popular vote | 1,213,473 | 774,761 |
| Percentage | 60.68% | 38.74% |
- Brooke: 40–50% 50–60% 60–70% 70–80% 80–90% >90% Peabody: 40–50% 50–60% 60–70%
U.S. senator before election
Leverett Saltonstall
Republican
Elected U.S. Senator
Edward Brooke
Republican

The 1966 United States Senate election in Massachusetts was held on November 8, 1966. Republican incumbent Leverett Saltonstall retired after serving for 22 years. Massachusetts attorney general Edward Brooke defeated former Massachusetts governor Endicott Peabody in a landslide.

Brooke was the first African American elected to the United States Senate after the end of Reconstruction and the first ever popularly elected, as Reconstruction ended before the passage of the Seventeenth Amendment to the United States Constitution. This election marked the first time since Reconstruction in 1874 that an African-American was elected to the United States Senate and Edward Brooke's inauguration was the first time since 1881 that an African-American United States senator held a United States Senate seat.

== Republican primary ==
=== Candidates ===
- Edward Brooke, Massachusetts attorney general since 1963
- J. Alan MacKay, Boston attorney and founding member of Young Americans for Freedom

==== Declined ====
- Leverett Saltonstall, incumbent U.S. senator since 1945

=== Campaign ===
MacKay campaigned against Brooke for refusing to back Barry Goldwater's 1964 presidential campaign. During the first stage of the campaign, conservative spokespersons engaged in an anti-Brooke publicity and letter-writing campaign. Conservatives were particularly critical of Brooke's book, The Challenge of Change. A critical review of the book was mailed to all Republican convention delegates, along with a questionnaire linking Brooke's views to the Communist Party and Americans for Democratic Action. A third mailing went out accusing Brooke of participating in "the phony Great Society schemes of L.B.J. and his curious crew."

However, conservative attacks were blunted when Goldwater endorsed Brooke in May and made a $100 donation to his campaign. Brooke also received the support of George W. Romney, a leading contender for the presidency in 1968. In advance of the convention, Brooke asked the party to formally endorse the United States policy in the Vietnam War and the recent Supreme Court decision regarding the rights of detainees in Miranda v. Arizona. McKay argued for a more aggressive bombing campaign in Southeast Asia and criticized Miranda as "rendering more difficult the proper enforcement of our laws."

=== Results ===
Brooke won the party endorsement at the June 25 convention and was unopposed in the September primary. Following the result, which precluded MacKay from seeking a primary challenge, Brooke declared, "This is a proud moment in my life, a moment which has no parallel."

1966 Republican state convention
| Party | Candidate | Votes | % |
|---|---|---|---|
| Republican | Edward W. Brooke | 1,485 | 87.35% |
| Republican | J. Alan MacKay | 215 | 12.65% |
| Total votes | | 1,700 | 100.00% |

== Democratic primary ==
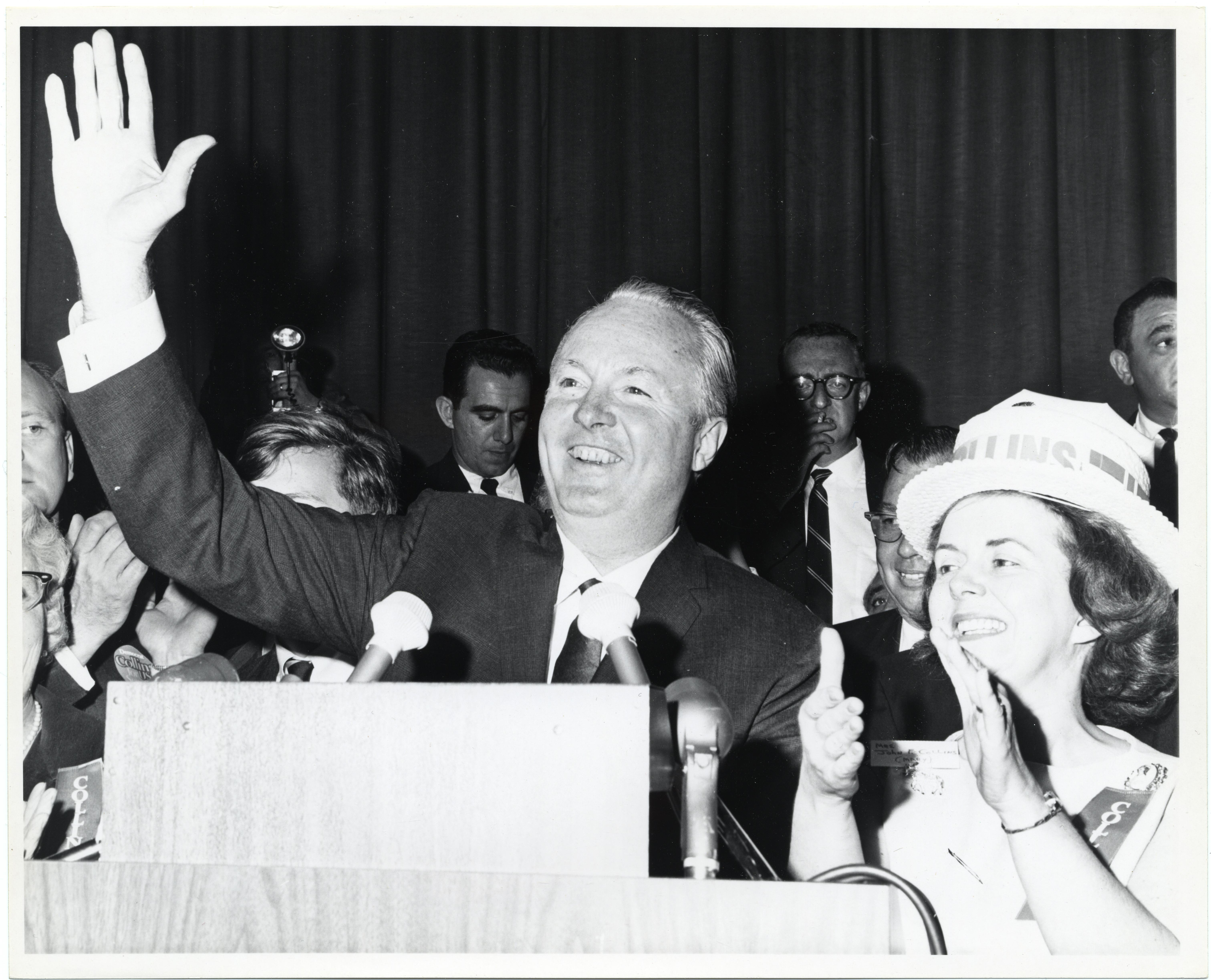
Democratic primary runner-up John F. Collins campaigning

=== Candidates ===
- Thomas Boylston Adams, academic and member of the Adams political family
- John F. Collins, mayor of Boston
- Endicott Peabody, former governor of Massachusetts

=== Results ===
1966 Democratic U.S. Senate primary
| Party | Candidate | Votes | % |
|---|---|---|---|
| Democratic | Endicott Peabody | 320,967 | 50.35% |
| Democratic | John F. Collins | 265,016 | 41.85% |
| Democratic | Thomas Boylston Adams | 51,435 | 8.07% |
| Total votes | | 637,418 | 100.00% |

== General election ==
=== Candidates ===
- Edward Brooke, Massachusetts attorney general since 1963 (Republican)
- Lawrence Gilfedder, perennial candidate (Socialist Labor)
- Endicott Peabody, former governor of Massachusetts (Democratic)
- Mark R. Shaw, perennial candidate and nominee for vice president of the United States in 1964 (Prohibition)

=== Results ===
General election
| Party | Candidate | Votes | % | ±% |
|---|---|---|---|---|
| Republican | Edward Brooke | 1,213,473 | 60.68% | ▲4.49 |
| Democratic | Endicott Peabody | 774,761 | 38.74% | ▼4.72 |
| Socialist Labor | Lawrence Gilfedder | 6,790 | 0.34% | ▲0.10 |
| Prohibition | Mark R. Shaw | 4,833 | 0.24% | ▲0.12 |
| Total votes | | 1,999,857 | 100.00% | |

== See also ==
- 1966 United States Senate elections

== External links and references ==
- Race details at ourcampaigns.com
