= George V. Kenneally Jr. =

American lawyer and politician (1929–1999)

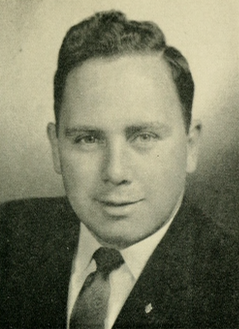
- George V. Kenneally Jr. in 1961

Member of the Massachusetts Senate
- In office 1963–1971
- Preceded by: John J. Beades
- Succeeded by: Joseph B. Walsh
- Constituency: 7th Suffolk (1963–1971); 6th Suffolk (1971)

Member of the Massachusetts House of Representatives for the 15th Suffolk district
- In office 1957–1963
- Preceded by: John P. McMorrow
- Succeeded by: Paul Murphy

Personal details
- Born: George Vincent Kenneally Jr. December 29, 1929 Boston, Massachusetts, U.S.
- Died: January 11, 1999 (aged 69) Florida, U.S.
- Party: Democratic
- Education: Northeastern University; Suffolk University Law School
- Occupation: Lawyer; Politician

George Vincent Kenneally Jr. (December 29, 1929 – January 11, 1999) was an American lawyer and politician who served in the Massachusetts General Court and was legal counsel to the Massachusetts Senate.

== Early life ==
Kenneally was born on December 29, 1929, in Boston. His father, George Kenneally, was a National Football League player and a teacher and coach at Revere High School. Kenneally graduated from The English High School, Northeastern University, and Suffolk University Law School.

== Political career ==
Kenneally first ran for the Massachusetts House of Representatives at the age of 22. After two unsuccessful attempts, he was elected in 1956. From 1963 to 1971 he was a member of the Massachusetts Senate. In 1964, Kenneally and Massachusetts Senate Majority Leader Maurice A. Donahue introduced a bill to establish the University of Massachusetts Boston, with Majority Whip of the Massachusetts House of Representatives Robert H. Quinn co-sponsoring the House bill. The bill was signed into law by Massachusetts Governor Endicott Peabody on June 16, 1964.

== Legal career ==
In 1971, Kenneally resigned to become the associate legal counsel of the Massachusetts Senate. He served as acting legal counsel from 1984 until his retirement on July 1, 1991. He died on January 11, 1999, after suffering a heart attack at his vacation home in West Palm Beach, Florida. He was 69 years old.
