= Executive Order 11063 =

1962 executive order signed by John F. Kennedy

Executive Order 11063 was an executive order signed by United States President John F. Kennedy on November 20, 1962. According to the United States Department of Housing and Urban Development circa 2006, the order prohibited "discrimination in the sale, leasing, rental, or other disposition of properties and facilities owned or operated by the federal government or provided with federal funds." Specifically, it banned segregation in federally funded housing, directing all executive branch agencies, to the extent related to housing, to "take all action necessary and appropriate to prevent discrimination because of race, color, creed, or national origin" in housing either owned or operated by the federal government, provided by loans either agreed to, insured, guaranteed, or secured by the federal government, or provided by property involved in slum clearance or urban renewal, and in lending practices related to loans insured of guaranteed by the federal government.

== See also ==
- Civil Rights Act of 1866 (prohibiting discrimination in housing, but had no enforcement provision)
- Civil Rights Act of 1964 (prohibiting discrimination by all programs and activities receiving federal funds)
- Civil Rights Act of 1968 (prohibiting discrimination in all housing)
