= Government of Chelsea, Massachusetts =

The city government of Chelsea, Massachusetts was incorporated in 1857. From 1739 to 1857, Chelsea was incorporated as a town. From 1857 to 1991 (with the exception of 1908 to 1911), the city's head of government was the mayor of Chelsea. The office of mayor ceased to exist after the city went into receivership. Since 1995, Chelsea has been led by a city manager.

== Town government ==
Chelsea was settled as part of Boston in 1624 by Samuel Maverick under the name of Winnisimmet (meaning "good spring nearby"). In 1739, Winnisimmet, along with the settlements Rumney Marsh, and Pullen Point (excluding Hog Island and Noddle's Island) was incorporated as a town. Upon its incorporation the town named after Chelsea, a neighborhood in London, England. Under this form of government, Chelsea was governed by a Town Meeting and Board of Selectmen. On February 22, 1841, part of Chelsea was annexed by Saugus, Massachusetts. On March 19, 1846, Rumney Marsh and Pullen Point became a separate town known as North Chelsea. Pullen Point later separated from North Chelsea to form Winthrop, Massachusetts and the remainder of North Chelsea changed its name to Revere, Massachusetts.

== City government ==
=== Mayor and aldermen ===
In 1857, Chelsea was incorporated as a city. It was governed by a mayor and board of aldermen. The city's first mayor was Francis B. Fay.

=== Board of Control ===
On April 12, 1908, nearly half the city was destroyed and 18,000 people (56% of the population) were left homeless by the first Great Chelsea Fire. In May 1908 the Massachusetts General Court passed an act creating a Board of Control to perform the duties of the mayor and board of aldermen during the recovery. It also appointed a five-member School Committee to take the place the fifteen-member elected one. The board consisted of five members appointed by Acting Governor Eben Sumner Draper. Three were appointed to a term of five years, one was appointed to a term of two years, and one was appointed to a term of one year. The members selected to the two- and one-year term were subject to reelection by the voters of Chelsea. In 1911, elections were held for the board of aldermen and mayor. However, the Board of Control remained as a supervisory board. In 1912, the board was dissolved as a result of a referendum.

Acting Governor Draper appointed William E. McClintock, a civil engineer and former chairman of the Massachusetts Highway Commission and City Engineer of Chelsea, Mark Wilmarth, a civil engineer from Malden, Massachusetts, Alton C. Ratschesky, a financier from Boston and Beverly, Massachusetts who was president of the United States Trust Company, Alton E. Briggs, a former teacher at Chelsea High School, and businessman George H. Dunham to the board. Dunham and Briggs were subject to reelection; Dunham in 1909 and Briggs in 1910. Both were reelected. The board met for the first time on June 3, 1908 and McClintock was elected chairman.

=== Return of mayor and aldermen ===
On December 12, 1911, Chelsea elected its first mayor and board of aldermen since the Board of Control took charge of the city government. James H. Malone defeated George W. Ford by 791 votes to become the city's first mayor in over three years. Alexander Cook, Marcus M. Merritt, William S. Young, William A. O'Brien, George F. Henderson, Jr., James J. Kane, Samuel Markell, David Wilte, and William J. Williams were elected to the board of aldermen, and Cook was chosen to serve as the board's president. Malone and the board were sworn in on January 1, 1912.

=== Receivership ===
During the late 1980s and early 1990s, the city was facing financial difficulties due to poor municipal accounting and unsound decisions made by the city's elected leaders. By 1991, Chelsea was facing a $9.5 million deficit and was faced with the possibility of laying off 25% of the city's employees. A proposed $2 million Proposition 2 1/2 override was rejected by the voters, which prevented the city from raising taxes high enough to cover the deficit. The city was faced with the possibility of being annexed by Boston or entering state receivership. On September 11, 1991, the state legislature approved Governor William Weld's proposal to appoint a receiver to take over Chelsea's municipal government. The receiver was granted almost unilateral control of the city, including the sole power to formulate budgets, issue bonds, and abrogate contracts. The office of mayor was eliminated and the board of aldermen was reduced to an advisory role. Weld chose businessman and former state Commissioner of Commerce, Secretary of Transportation, and MBTA Chairman James Carlin to serve as the city's receiver.

=== City manager and city council ===
In August 1995, a new city charter was enacted. The new charter placed policy and legislative authority in an eleven-member city council and vested strong executive and administrative powers in an appointed city manager. The city manager is the chief executive of the city and is responsible for the day-to-day administration of city affairs.

== List of mayors ==
This is a list of the Mayors of Chelsea, Massachusetts.

#	Mayor	Picture	Term	Party	Notes
1st	Francis B. Fay		1857 – January 4, 1858	Whig	
2nd	Hosea Ilsley		January 4, 1858 – 1860		
3rd	Frank B. Fay		1861 – January 4, 1864	Republican	
4th	Eustace C. Fitz		January 4, 1864 – 1866	None	
5th	Rufus S. Frost		1867 – 1868	Republican	
6th	James B. Forsyth		1869 – 1870		
7th	John W. Fletcher		1871 – 1872		
8th	Charles H. Ferson		1873 – 1875		
9th	Thomas Green		1876 – 1877		
10th	Isaac Stebbins		1877 – 1879		
11th	Andrew J. Bacon		1879 – 1881		
12th	Samuel Parcher Tenney		1881 – 1883		
13th	Thomas Strahan		1883 – 1884	Republican	
14th	Eugene F. Endicott		1885 – 1886	Republican	
15th	George E. Mitchell		1887 – 1888	Republican	
16th	Arthur B. Champlin		1888 – 1889	Republican	
17th	Albert D. Bosson		1891	Democratic	
18th	Alfred C. Converse		1892 – 1893	Republican	
19th	George H. Carter		1894 – 1895	Republican	Elected as a Republican in 1894, and in 1895 he was reelected having been nominated on the Republican and Citizens Party tickets.
20th	John C. Loud		1896		
21st	Hermon W. Pratt		1897	Republican	
22nd	Seth J. Littlefield		1898 – 1899	Republican	
23rd	James Gould		1900 – 1901		
24th	Edward E. Willard		1902 – 1907	Republican	
25th	John E. Beck		1908 – June 3, 1908	Republican	
26th	James H. Malone		1912		
27th	Edward E. Willard		1913 – 1914	Republican	
28th	James H. Malone		1915 – 1916		
29th	Edward E. Willard		1917 – 1918	Republican	
30th	Melvin B. Breath		1919 – 1921	Democratic	
31st	Lawrence F. Quigley		1922 – 1926	Democratic	
32nd	John J. Whalen		1927	Democratic	This was the last of the one year mayoral terms.
33rd	Lawrence F. Quigley		1928 – 1929	Democratic	This was the first of the two-year mayoral terms.
34th	John J. Whalen		1930 – 1931	Democratic	
35th	Lawrence F. Quigley		1932 – 1935	Democratic	
36th	Edward J. Voke		1936 – 1941	Democratic	
37th	Bernard L. Sullivan		1942 – 1947		
38th	Tom Keating		1948 – 1949		
39th	Joseph A. Melley		1950 – 1951	Democratic	
40th	Andrew P. Quigley		1952 – 1955	Democratic	
41st	Hugh McLaughlin		1956 – 1959		
42nd	Alfred R. Voke		1960 – 1963		
43rd	John J. Slater, Jr.		1964 – 1969		
44th	Joseph Margolis		1970		
Acting	Charles W. DeIorio		1971		Became acting mayor when Mayor Joseph Margolis died in office
45th	Philip J. Spellman		1972 – 1975		
46th	Joel Pressman		1976 – 1983	Democratic	
47th	James D. Mitchell		1984 – 1985		
48th	Thomas Nolan		1986 – 1987		
49th	John J. Brennan, Jr.		1988 – September 12, 1991		

== List of city managers ==
This is a list of the city managers of Chelsea, Massachusetts.

#	City manager	Picture	Term	Notes
1st	Guy A. Santagate		August 18, 1995 – June 30, 2000	
Interim	Andrew Maylor		June 30, 2000 – September 7, 2000	Chelsea's Finance Director. Served as interim city manager after the city council became deadlocked between Jay Ash and Robert Markel.
2nd	Jay Ash		September 7, 2000 – December 19, 2014	
Interim	Ned Keefe		December 19, 2014 – July 20, 2015	Chelsea's deputy city manager. Became interim city manager after Ash became the state's Secretary of Housing and Economic Development.
3rd	Thomas G. Ambrosino		July 20, 2015 – January 30, 2023	
Interim	Ned Keefe		January 31, 2023 – December 31, 2023	Chelsea's deputy city manager. Became interim city manager after Ambrosino became the court administrator of the Trial Court for Massachusetts.
4th	Fidel Maltez		January 1, 2024 – present	

== See also ==
Chelsea Historical Society, Mayors of Chelsea 1857 – 1991.^{[usurped]}
