= Alfred Collins =

Alfred Collins may refer to:

- Alf Collins (1866–1951), British actor
- Sonny Collins (Alfred Eugene Collins, born 1953), American football player
- Alfred Collins (American football) (born 2001), American football player

== See also ==
- Alfred Collins Converse (1827–1915), American businessman and politician
- Alfred Collins Lockwood (1875–1951), American judge and politicians
