= Ann Norton =

Ann Norton may refer to:

- Ann Frasier Norton (1893–1918), yeomanette in the U.S. Navy
- Ann McBride Norton (1944–2020), American activist and business executive
- Ann Weaver Norton (1905–1982), American sculptor and writer of children's books
- Anne Norton (born 1954), American professor of political science and comparative literature

== See also ==
- Anne Norton (born 1954), American professor of political science and comparative literature
- Anne Turner (murderer) (born Anne Norton)
