= Edward Willard =

Edward Willard may refer to:

- Edward E. Willard (1862–1929), American mayor of Chelsea, Massachusetts
- E. S. Willard (Edward Smith Willard, 1853–1915), English actor
