= Andrew P. Quigley =

American politician and newspaper publisher (1926–1990)

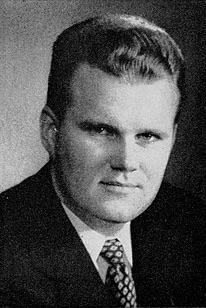

Mayor of Chelsea, Massachusetts
- In office 1952–1955
- Preceded by: Joseph A. Melley
- Succeeded by: Hugh J. McLaughlin

Member of the Massachusetts Senate for the 1st Suffolk district
- In office 1951–1957
- Preceded by: Joseph A. Melley
- Succeeded by: Harold W. Canavan

Personal details
- Born: January 13, 1926 Chelsea, Massachusetts, U.S.
- Died: May 25, 1990 (aged 64) Boston, Massachusetts, U.S.
- Resting place: Woodlawn Cemetery; Everett, Massachusetts
- Party: Democratic
- Occupation: Newspaper publisher

Andrew Patrick Quigley (January 13, 1926 – May 25, 1990) was an American politician and newspaper publisher who served as mayor of Chelsea, Massachusetts from 1952 to 1955.

== Early life ==
Quigley was born on January 13, 1926, in Chelsea, Massachusetts. His father, Lawrence F. Quigley, served as mayor of Chelsea for 11 years and was the commandant of the Chelsea Soldiers' Home. His mother, Zita L. Quigley, was a trustee of the Chelsea Public Library for over 40 years and a member of the Chelsea School Committee during the 1940s. Quigley attended Cranwell Preparatory School and graduated from Chelsea High School in 1944. He served as a Seaman 1st Class aboard a United States Navy PT boat during World War II. After his discharge in 1946, Quigley attended the Georgetown School of Foreign Service.

== Politics ==
In 1948, Quigley was elected to the Massachusetts House of Representatives. In 1949, he ran for mayor of Chelsea, but lost to Joseph A. Melley. In 1950, he was elected to the Massachusetts Senate. In 1951, he again ran for mayor and this time defeated Melley by 1548 votes. At 25 years old, Quigley was one of the youngest mayors in Massachusetts. In 1953, he defeated former alderman Andrew P. Murphy by 736 votes to win a second term. In 1955, Quigley was defeated by alderman and state representative Hugh J. McLaughlin 8,419 votes to 7,042.

Quigley remained in the state senate while serving as mayor. In 1956, he challenged Massachusetts's 7th congressional district representative Thomas J. Lane. Quigley finished a distant second to Lane, who was in prison for tax evision during the election, in a five-candidate Democratic primary. Following his defeat, Quigley represented the Massachusetts department of commerce in New York City.

In 1959, McLaughlin did not run for reelection and Quigley ran to succeed him. He lost the general election to state representative Alfred R. Voke 7,440 votes to 6,554.

In 1961, Quigley returned to elected office as a member of the Chelsea school committee. In 1986, he proposed a partnership with Boston University that saw BU take over the Chelsea Public Schools. The university was given the power to set budgets, devise curriculum, and negotiate all union contracts. Quigley remained on the school committee until his death on May 25, 1990.

== Publishing ==
In 1949, Quigley purchased the Winthrop Transcript. In 1959, he merged the paper with the Winthrop Sun to form the Winthrop Sun Transcript. In 1976, he took over the dying Chelsea Record as both publisher and editor. In 1979, he was given awards for best editorial and best news story from the Massachusetts Press Association. In 1981, he was given the New England Press Association's award for best editorial. In 1983, he purchased the Saugus Advertiser and three years later he created the East Boston Sun-Transcript. In 1988 he sold all four papers to Journal-Transcripts Publishing of Revere.
