= Melvin B. Breath =

American politician (1881–1950)

Melvin Bernard Breath
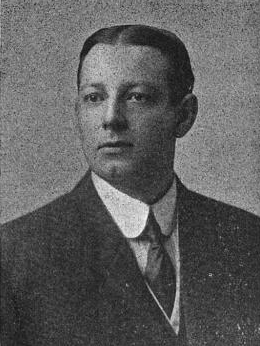

30th Mayor of Chelsea, Massachusetts
- In office 1919–1921
- Preceded by: Edward E. Willard
- Succeeded by: Lawrence F. Quigley

Member of the Massachusetts House of Representatives 26th Suffolk District
- In office 1911–1912
- Preceded by: William M. Robinson
- Succeeded by: William M. Robinson

Member of the Chelsea, Massachusetts Board of Aldermen
- In office 1908–1908

Personal details
- Born: March 28, 1881
- Died: July 1, 1950 (aged 69) Chelsea, Massachusetts
- Spouse: Lillian Constance Murray
- Education: Boston College, Boston University School of Law
- Profession: Lawyer

Melvin Bernard Breath (March 28, 1881 – July 1, 1950) was an American lawyer and politician who served in the Massachusetts House of Representatives; and on the Board of Aldermen, and as the thirtieth Mayor of Chelsea, Massachusetts.

== Early life ==
Breath was born on March 28, 1881, to Melvin L. and Maria (Noone) Breath.

== Education ==
Breath attended the Chelsea, Massachusetts public schools, he graduated from Chelsea High School, Boston College and Boston University School of Law.

== Law practice ==
Melvin B. Breath was a partner, with Robert W. Frost, in the law firm of Frost and Breath, their offices were in the Tremont Building (no. 817), 110 Tremont Street, Boston, Massachusetts.

== Notes ==
Political offices
Preceded by Edward E. Willard	30th Mayor of Chelsea, Massachusetts; 1919–1921	Succeeded by Lawrence F. Quigley
