= Melley =

Melley is a surname. Notable people with the surname include:

- Joseph A. Melley (1902–1983), American attorney and politician
- Maura Melley (fl. 1973), American lawyer, insurance executive, and civil servant
