= Alfred R. Voke =

American politician (1919–1983)

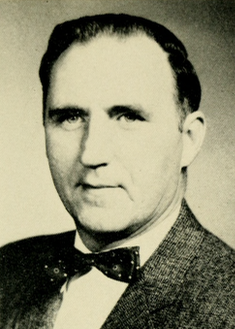

Mayor of Chelsea, Massachusetts
- In office 1960–1963
- Preceded by: Hugh J. McLaughlin
- Succeeded by: John J. Slater Jr.

Member of the Massachusetts House of Representatives for the 23rd Suffolk district
- In office 1957–1963
- Preceded by: Harry Coltun
- Succeeded by: John F. Donovan Jr.

Personal details
- Born: February 12, 1919 Boston, Massachusetts, U.S.
- Died: September 14, 1983 (aged 64) Boston, Massachusetts, U.S.
- Party: Democratic

Alfred R. Voke (February 12, 1919 – September 14, 1983) was an American politician who served as mayor of Chelsea, Massachusetts and was a member of the Massachusetts House of Representatives.

== Early life ==
Voke was born on February 12, 1919, in Boston's Charlestown neighborhood. He was the son of Chelsea fire chief Charles G. Voke and the nephew of Chelsea mayor and Massachusetts Superior Court justice Edward J. Voke. He graduated from Chelsea High School in 1936 and the Lawrence Academy in 1938. He studied pre-law at Boston University and attended Suffolk University Law School until World War II, when he left school to join the United States Army. He retired from the Army in 1947 with the rank of captain.

== Politics ==
In 1956, Voke was elected to the Massachusetts House of Representatives. In 1959, he defeated former mayor Andrew P. Quigley 7,440 votes to 6,554 to become mayor of Chelsea. He served as mayor and state representative concurrently, which was not uncommon in Chelsea due to the Mayor's low salary. In 1961, he defeated board of aldermen president William A. Quigley (no relation to Andrew P. Quigley) by a 2 to 1 margin to win a second term as mayor. He did not run for reelection in 1963.

== Later life ==
In 1964, Voke was appointed chairman of the board of project review, which was tasked with arbitrating disputes between the state Department of Public Works and the 10 communities on the planned route for the ill-fated Inner Belt. He later served as a statistical investigator for the state. His son, Richard A. Voke, followed in his footsteps and also served in the Massachusetts House of Representatives. Voke died on September 14, 1983, at the Veterans Administration Hospital in West Roxbury.
