= Nancy Gardner Prince =

African-American writer (1799–c. 1859)

Nancy Gardner Prince (September 15, 1799 – c. 1859) was an African-American woman born free in Newburyport, Massachusetts, She wrote about her travels in Russia and Jamaica during the nineteenth century in her autobiography titled A Narrative of The Life And Travels of Mrs. Nancy Prince, published in 1850.

== Early life ==
Little is known about Nancy Gardner Prince's family life.

She was daughter to Tobias Wornton, a slave taken captive from Africa by Captain Winthrop Sargent. Her father was Thomas Gardner, a seaman from Nantucket, who died when she was an infant, leaving her in the care of her mother who subsequently married several times, and had seven children. They sold berries to support the family and Prince eventually went on to work as a servant for white families.

== Marriage ==
Nancy Gardner met Nero Prince in Massachusetts on September 1, 1823, when he arrived in Boston. He was the second grand master of the Prince Hall Freemasons in Boston and originally came from Russia, where he was a member of the Imperial Court. On February 15, 1824, they were married and later travelled to Russia, where she opened a boarding home and made clothing for infants, while her husband was a footman to Czar Alexander I in St. Petersburg.

== Travels ==
Her published autobiography includes an account of how her marriage led her to the Russian Courts of Alexander I and Nicholas I in 1824. In Russia she encountered many new customs and events that she had to attend, including funerals, burials, holiday celebrations, religious practices, and coronations. She also witnessed first hand the Flood of 1824, The St. Petersburg cholera outbreak, and the Decembrist Revolution as they unfolded in Russia.

The newspaper she participated in

In 1840, Prince went on two missionary trips to Jamaica, where the nation's enslaved people had recently been freed in 1838, with the support of abolitionists W. L Garrison and Lucretia Mott. In her time in Jamaica, she worked in Kingston alongside church officials and raised funds for a free labor school for Jamaican girls. Her travels to Jamaica also brought her into contact with the Returned Jamaican Maroons of Flagstaff, who had returned to Jamaica after half a century's exile in Sierra Leone. They had been exiled from Jamaica after the Second Maroon War of 1795–1796.

== Later life and death ==
In her years after Russia, she opened an orphanage for black children and a sewing shop in Boston. She gave lectures about her travels to Russia and Jamaica, also aiding in the progression of the Anti-Slavery Society established by W. L. Garrison where she attended meetings. She worked for emancipation and against the Fugitive Slave Act and attended at least one Women's Rights Convention. She died on November 6, 1859, and was buried in Everett, Massachusetts, in the First Baptist Church of Boston (which she joined in 1858) lot in Woodlawn Cemetery.

Prince's most notable work

== Implications ==
Prince's most notable work, A Narrative of The Life And Travels of Mrs. Nancy Prince, was published in 1853 and gives an account of her travels in Europe, Russia and Jamaica, as well as her personal life. In the book, Prince critiques the state of the times through the lens of an African-American woman. Prince does this by adapting to the cultural and historical customs of the places she visits and comparing them to her lived experiences in her early life in America as a Black Woman. Due to this contribution to African-American literature, Prince's documentation is notable as the precedent example of combining the traditions of the travel narrative, autobiography and the slave narrative into a unified body of work.
