= William Matthew Prior =

American painter

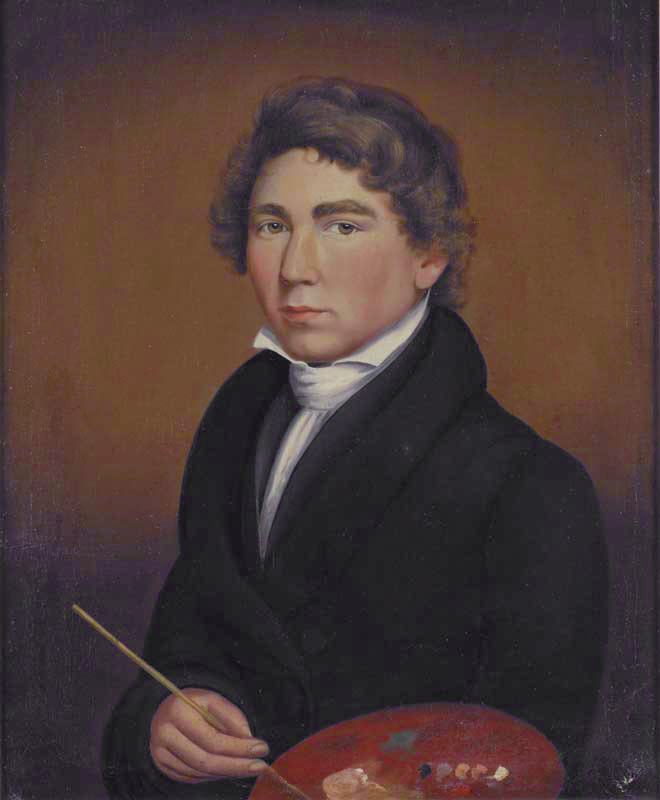
- Self-portrait (1825)
- Born: William Matthew Prior; May 16, 1806; Bath, Massachusetts
- Died: January 21, 1873 (aged 66); East Boston, Massachusetts
- Known for: Folk art
- Spouse: Rosamund Clark Hamblin

William Matthew Prior (May 16, 1806 – January 21, 1873) was an American folk artist known for his portraits, particularly of families and children.

== Biography ==
The son of Captain William, a shipmaster, and Sarah Bryant Prior, William Matthew Prior was born in Bath, Massachusetts (it would become part of Maine in 1820) on May 16, 1806. Prior completed his first portrait in 1823, at the age of 17 after training under Charles Codman, another Maine-based painter.

In 1840, Prior moved to East Boston, Massachusetts, from his native Bath with his in-laws, notably fellow painter Sturtevant J. Hamblin, to invigorate his career as an artist. The paintings of Prior and Hamblin, when unsigned, are so similar in style as to be indistinguishable, and are commonly attributed to the "Prior-Hamblin School". According to the 1852 directory of Boston, Prior lived at 36 Trenton Street in East Boston.

He was a follower of the preacher William Miller, who prophesied that the end of the world was imminent. Prior wrote two books about Miller's teachings, The King's Vesture (1862) and The Empyrean Canopy (1868).

Prior died on January 21, 1873, and was interred at Woodlawn Cemetery in Everett, Massachusetts.

About 1,500 portraits are attributed to Prior. His works are in many museums and institutions around the United States including the Harvard Art Museums, Museum of Fine Arts, Boston, and the National Gallery of Art.

Prior is the subject of an exhibition, Artist and Visionary: William Matthew Prior Revealed, shown at the Fenimore Art Museum, Cooperstown, New York (May 26 – December 31, 2012) and subsequently at the American Folk Art Museum in New York City (January 24 – May 26, 2013).

== Works ==
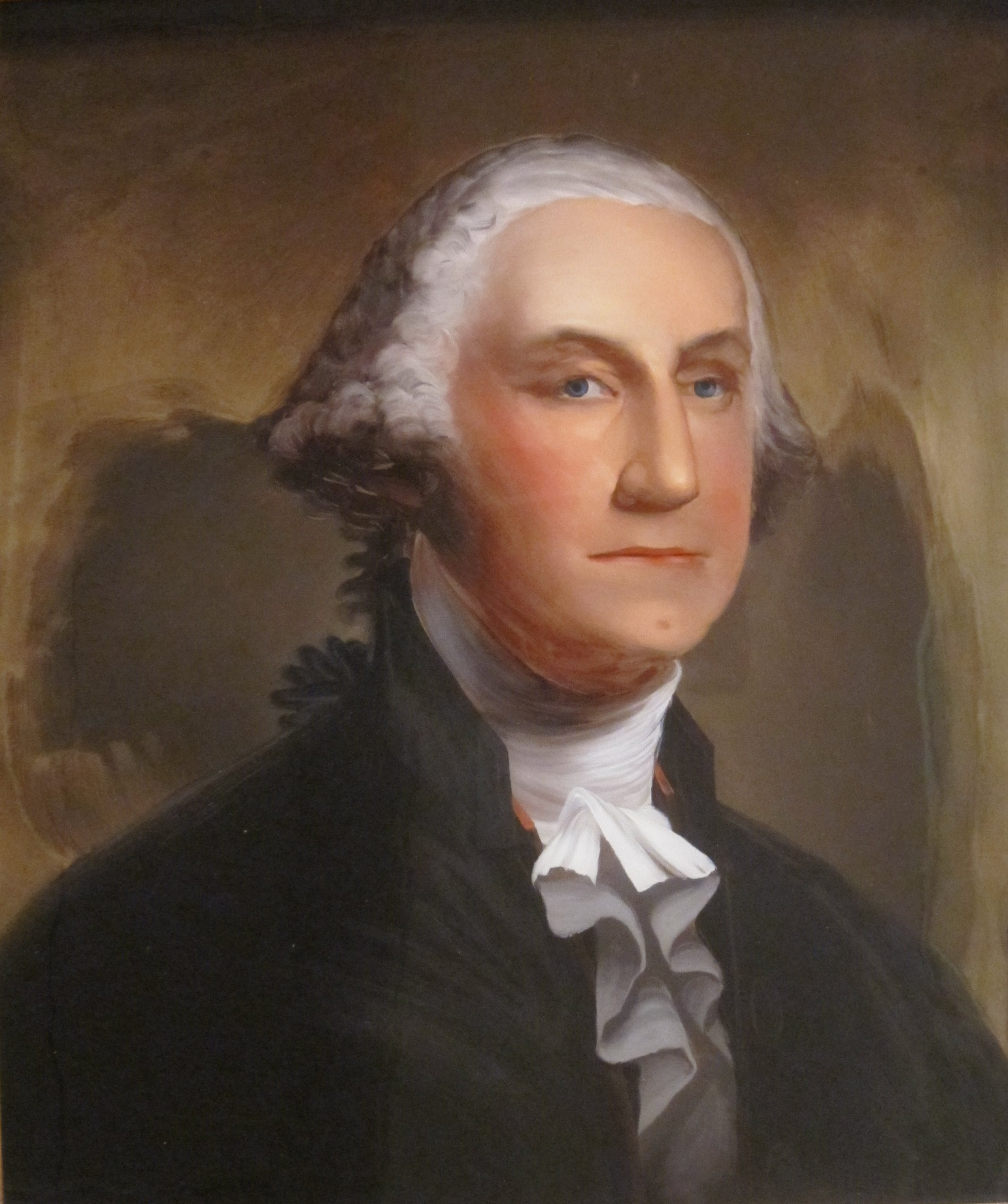
George Washington, c. 1860

Mrs. Nancy Lawson, 1843

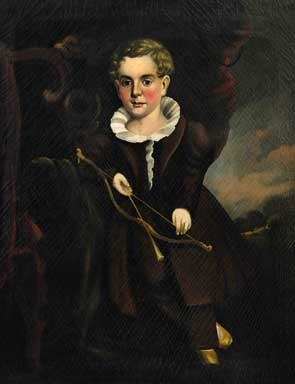
Portrait of a Young Boy with Flounced Collar and Brown Suit Holding a Bow and Arrow

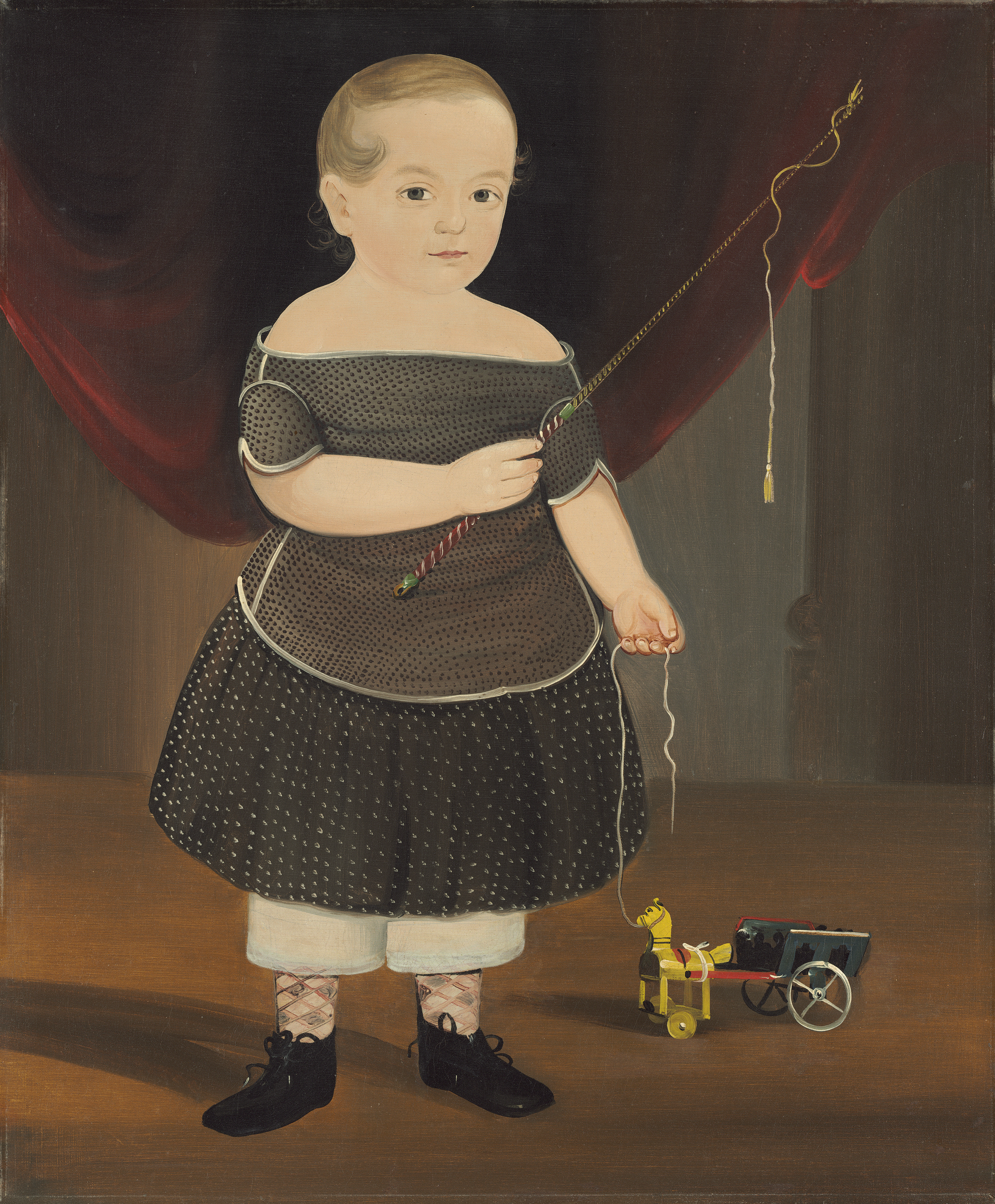
Boy with Toy Horse and Wagon
