= William H. Howe =

Medal of Honor recipient

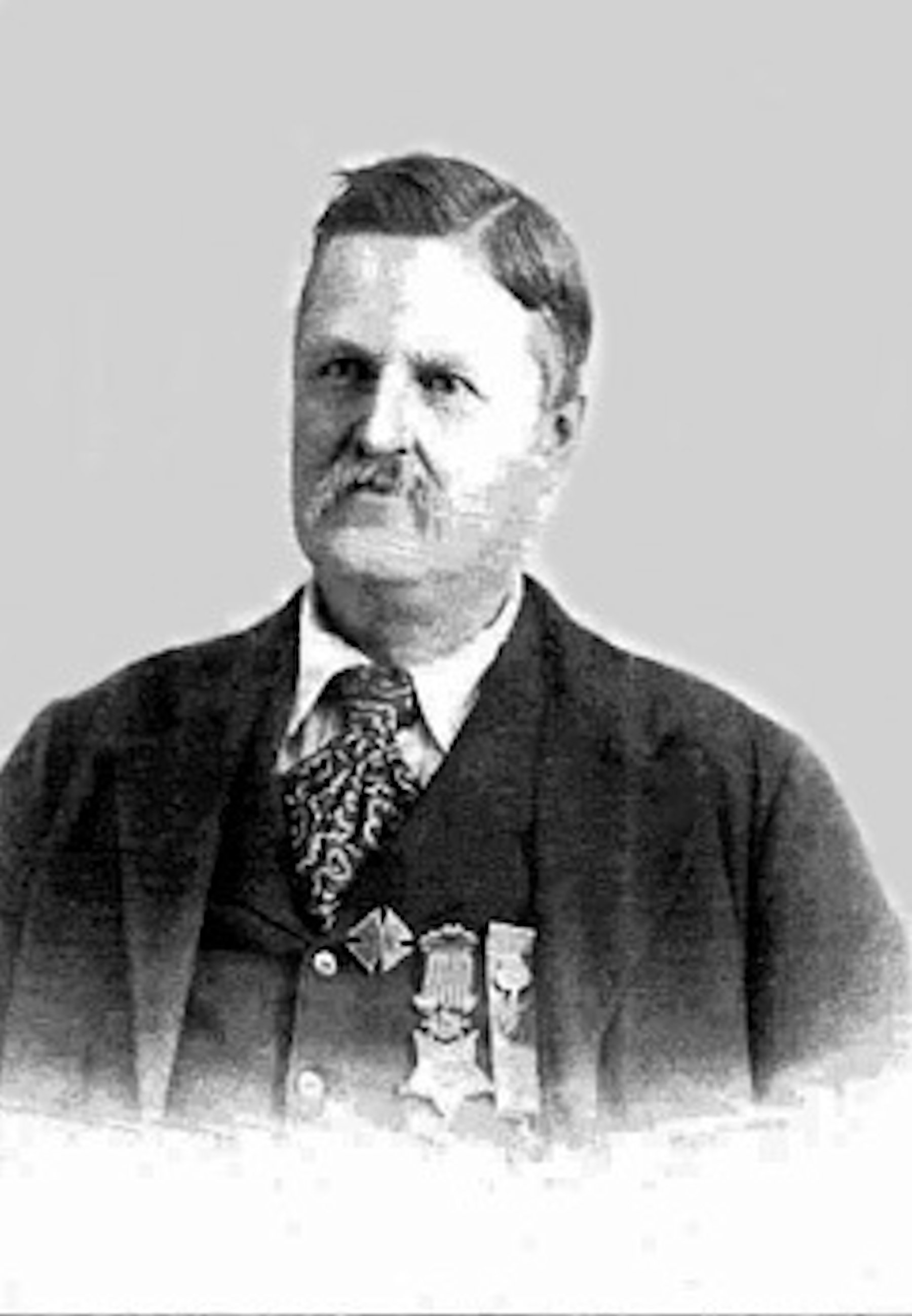
William H. Howe c. 1899

William H. Howe (April 11, 1837 – April 23, 1907) was an American soldier and Medal of Honor recipient who served in the Union Army during the American Civil War.

== Biography ==
Howe was born in Haverhill, Massachusetts on April 11, 1837. He served as Sergeant and eventually a First Lieutenant in Company K of the 29th Massachusetts Volunteer Infantry Regiment. He earned his medal on March 25, 1865, at the Battle of Fort Stedman, Virginia. His medal was issued on March 8, 1895. He died on April 23, 1907, in Everett, Massachusetts and is now interred in Woodlawn Cemetery, Everett.

== Medal of Honor Citation ==
Served an abandoned gun under heavy fire.
