= Howard Adams Carson =

American civil engineer

- Born: November 28, 1842; Westfield, Massachusetts, US
- Died: October 26, 1931 (aged 88); Malden, Massachusetts, US
- Burial place: Woodlawn Cemetery, Everett, Massachusetts
- Occupation: civil engineer

Howard Adams Carson (1842–1931) was an American civil engineer and pioneer of tunnel construction.

== Career ==
Carson received his B.S. from MIT in 1869. He was an assistant engineer at the Providence, Rhode Island water works from 1871 to 1877. He then became an engineer for Boston's metropolitan engineering department. He was appointed as the chief engineer for Boston's new sewage and drainage system, which he designed in 1887. When the Boston Transit Commission was created in 1894, he was appointed as the Commission's Chief Engineer. Carson is most famous as the chief engineer for the Tremont Street subway, which was begun in March 1895 and completed in September 1897. He was also the chief engineer of the East Boston and Washington Street subways. In 1909 he resigned from the Boston Transit Commission and then served as a consultant for several engineering projects, including the construction of the New York subway and a two-track railway tunnel under the Detroit River. He wrote the article Tunnel for the 11th edition of the Encyclopædia Britannica.

Carson served as president of the Alumni Association of Massachusetts Institute of Technology from 1884 to 1887. In 1906 he was awarded the honorary degree of A.M. by Harvard University.

== Personal life ==
In 1870 he married Nancy Wilmarth (1845–1913) of Boston.
