= Eugene F. Endicott =

American politician

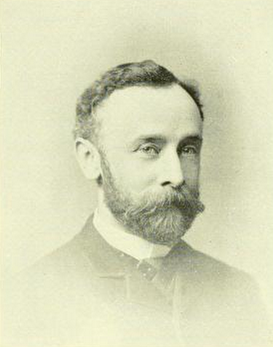

Member of the Massachusetts House of Representatives 28th Suffolk District
- In office 1905–1905
- Majority: 2,902

14th Mayor of Chelsea, Massachusetts
- In office 1885–1886
- Preceded by: Thomas Strahan
- Succeeded by: George E. Mitchell

President of the Chelsea, Massachusetts Common Council
- In office 1882–1884
- Preceded by: Thomas Strahan

Member of the Chelsea, Massachusetts Common Council
- In office 1880–1884

Personal details
- Born: October 14, 1848 Chelsea, Massachusetts
- Died: December 10, 1914 (aged 66) Chelsea, Massachusetts
- Party: Republican
- Profession: Manager of the Universalist Publishing House.

Eugene F. Endicott (October 14, 1848 – December 10, 1914) was a Massachusetts politician who served as the fourteenth Mayor of Chelsea, Massachusetts.]

== Notes ==
Political offices
Preceded by Thomas Strahan	14th Mayor of Chelsea, Massachusetts; 1885–1886	Succeeded by George E. Mitchell
Preceded by Thomas Strahan	President of the Common Council of Chelsea, Massachusetts; 1882–1884	Succeeded by
