= Albert D. Bosson =

American judge (1853–1926)

Albert Davis Bosson
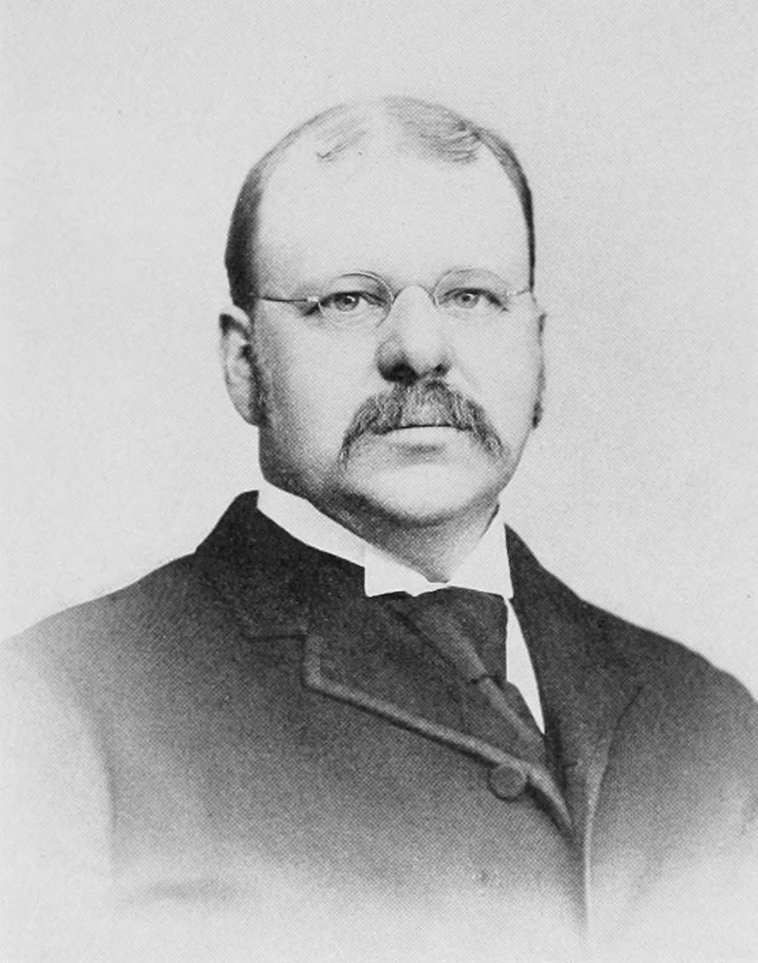

17th Mayor of Chelsea, Massachusetts
- In office 1891–1891
- Preceded by: Arthur B. Champlin
- Succeeded by: Alfred C. Converse

Justice of the Chelsea District Court
- In office July 1892 – April 4, 1926
- Nominated by: William E. Russell

Associate Justice of Chelsea District Court
- In office December 1882 – July 1892
- Nominated by: John Davis Long

Personal details
- Born: November 8, 1853 Chelsea, Massachusetts
- Died: April 4, 1926 Boston, Massachusetts
- Party: Republican (to 1884); Democratic
- Spouse: Alice Lavinia Campbell
- Children: Campbell Bosson, b. November 18, 1888; Pauline Arlaud Bosson, b. February 24, 1894
- Education: Phillips Exeter; Brown (1875); Boston University School of Law
- Profession: Attorney; Banker; Judge

Albert Davis Bosson (November 8, 1853 – April 4, 1926) was a Massachusetts jurist, attorney, and politician who served as the seventeenth Mayor of Chelsea, Massachusetts.

== Early life ==
Bosson was born in Chelsea, Massachusetts, on November 8, 1853, to George Chapman and Jennie (Hood) Bosson.

== Family life ==
In 1887 Bosson married Alice Lavinia Campbell the daughter of Charles A. and Lavinia (Hutchinson) Campbell. They had two children, a son, Campbell Bosson, born on November 18, 1888, and a daughter, Pauline Arlaud Bosson, born on February 24, 1894.

== Judgeship ==
In December 1882 Governor John Davis Long appointed Bosson as a Special Justice of the Chelsea Police Court. In 1892 Bosson was nominated by Governor William E. Russell to be a full Justice of the Chelsea Police Court. Bosson's nomination was approved at a meeting of the Governor's Council in July 1892.

== Death ==
Bosson died on Easter Sunday, April 4, 1926, in his apartment at the Hotel Sheraton at 91 Bay State Road, in Boston's Back Bay neighborhood.

== Notes ==
Political offices
Preceded by Arthur B. Champlin	17th Mayor of Chelsea, Massachusetts; 1891	Succeeded by Alfred C. Converse
