= James B. Forsyth =

American mayor (1809–1872)

6th Mayor of Chelsea, Massachusetts
- In office 1869–1870
- Preceded by: Rufus S. Frost
- Succeeded by: John W. Fletcher

Personal details
- Born: James Brander Forsyth; October 25, 1809 Farmington, Maine
- Died: March 8, 1872 (aged 62) Chelsea, Massachusetts
- Profession: Physician

James Brander Forsyth (October 25, 1809 – March 8, 1872) was a Massachusetts medical doctor and politician who served as a city councilor, alderman and as the sixth Mayor of Chelsea, Massachusetts.

== Notes ==
Political offices
Preceded by Rufus S. Frost	6th Mayor of Chelsea, Massachusetts; 1869–1870	Succeeded by John W. Fletcher
