= Mary E. Elliot =

American writer, lecturer (1851–1942)

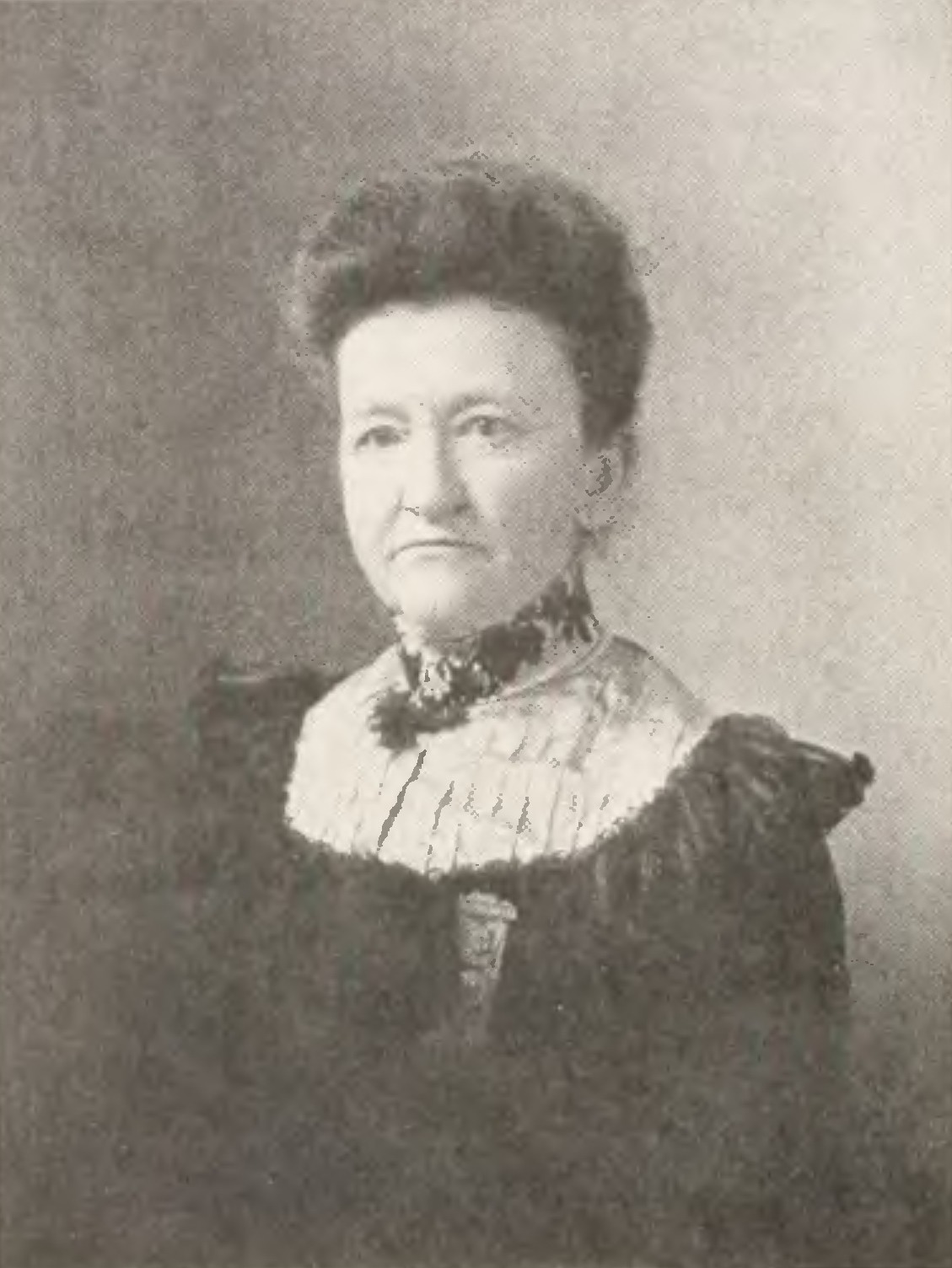
- Born: Mary Elvira Elliott; February 2, 1851; Somerville, Massachusetts, U.S.
- Died: November 7, 1942 (aged 91); Somerville
- Occupations: writer; lecturer
- Known for: 50 years, Secretary, Department of Massachusetts, Woman's Relief Corps
- Notable work: Sketches of representative women of New England

Signature
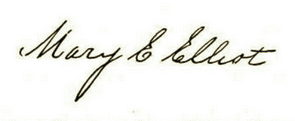

Mary E. Elliot (1851–1942) was an American writer and lecturer. She was active within the Woman's Relief Corps (W.R.C.) where she served for 50 years as Secretary of the Department of Massachusetts, and was also the organization's National Press Correspondent, 1908. Elliot was a regular contributor to the military department of The Boston Globe. From 1867 to 1885, she was active in temperance work.

== Early life and education ==
Mary Elvira Elliot (or Elliott) was born February 2, 1851, in Somerville, Massachusetts. Her parents were Joseph and Zenora (Tucker) Elliot. Joseph and Zenora (Tucker) Elliot had three children—Charles Darwin, Alfred Lawrence, and Mary E. Mrs. Zenora Elliot was a woman of progressive ideas and of literary talent, several of her poems having been published. Mary's brother, Charles Darwin Elliot, served in the civil war. He was the first city engineer of Somerville, and for three years, was president of the Historical Society of that city.

She was educated at the public schools of Somerville, and Cambridge, Massachusetts, and at a private school in Foxborough, Massachusetts.

== Career ==
Elliot began writing for the press in 1867, and published numerous articles and reports.

From 1867 to 1885, she was active in temperance work, giving addresses in many places in Massachusetts and having a wide acquaintance with workers in the cause in other States.

She inherited a love for patriotic principles, and, when invited to assist in organizing a W.R.C. in Somerville, readily accepted. This corps was formed in 1878 as an auxiliary to Willard C. Kinsley Post, No. 139, Grand Army of the Republic (G.A.R.), and was one of the first societies of the kind organized in the country on the basis of ritualistic work. She prepared the ritual under which its meetings were conducted, and was its president three years. (Note: Who's who in New England (1909) records that Elliott assisted in organizing one of the first relief corps of the G.A.R., Somerville, 1878, and was its president for five years.) This was a so-called independent organization, conducting its work on local lines only, until May 1892, when it united with the Department of Massachusetts, and was reorganized on a broader basis. It was instituted May 11, 1882, as Relief Corps No. 21, and thereafter was connected with the State organization, being one of the leading corps among the one 174 of the State.

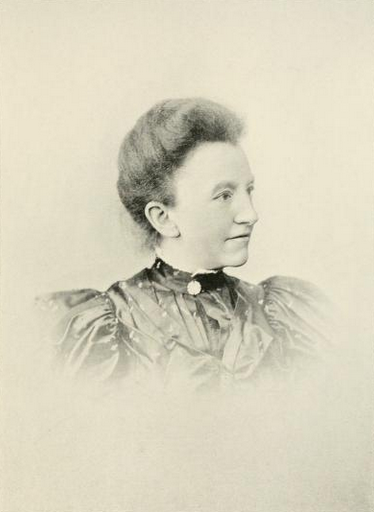
(no later than 1895)

Elliot was president of this corps nearly two years and secretary one year. In June 1885, she was appointed by Mary S. Goodale, Department President, to the office of Department Secretary, to fill a vacancy caused by the resignation of Sarah E. Fuller, who had been elected National President of the order at Portland, Maine.

Elliot held the position of Department Secretary for 50 years, having been annually reappointed by the succeeding Department Presidents. There being 174 subordinate corps and over 14,000 members, her office was one of great responsibility.

She participated in all the National Conventions since 1883, and in the performance of this duty, traveled in nearly all the States and Territories of the Union. In 1895, she was chair of a committee to compile a history of the Department of Massachusetts, W.R.C., a volume of 400 pages.

Elliot delivered Memorial Day addresses in Massachusetts and New Hampshire by invitation of G.A.R. posts, and participated in several hundred patriotic gatherings. She was chair of the Press Committee for the National Convention in Boston (1904), a position she held during the arrangements for the National Convention in Boston in 1890, and was also a member of the Executive Committee, Entertainment and other committees for that gathering. She was presented a valuable gold watch and chain set with diamonds, a testimonial from members throughout the State, and her friends also presented her portrait to department headquarters in the Boylston Building.

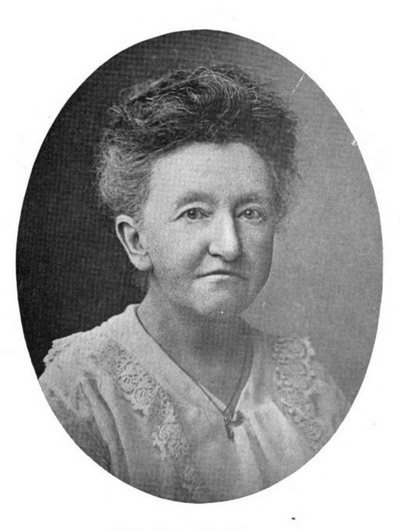
(no later than 1920)

For 20 years, she was a regular contributor to the military department of The Boston Globe, and wrote extensively upon woman's patriotic efforts. She prepared but did not publish a book giving historical and biographical data concerning the men in whose honor the posts of the G.A.R. are named.

Elliot was an officer of the Ladies' Aid Association of the Soldiers' Home in Massachusetts, and her name was on its first roll of membership. She is also a charter member of Bunker Hill Chapter, Daughters of the American Revolution, a member of the Somerville Historical Society, of the New England Historic Genealogical Society, and of other organizations. She took a special interest in historical matters. She was also an honorary member of the Massachusetts Union Ex-Prisoners of War Association.

Elliot is one of the compilers of Sketches of representative women of New England, 1904.

== Personal life ==
She was liberal in her religious belief, being a Universalist.

Mary E. Elliot died in Somerville, November 7, 1942, and was buried at Woodlawn Cemetery, in Everett, Massachusetts.
