= Thomas G. Ambrosino =

American politician and government official

Court Administrator of the Trial Court for Massachusetts
- In office January 30, 2023 – Present
- Preceded by: John A. Bello

City Manager of Chelsea, Massachusetts
- In office July 20, 2015 – January 30, 2023
- Preceded by: Jay Ash
- Succeeded by: Ned Keefe (interim)

Mayor of Revere, Massachusetts
- In office 2000–2012
- Preceded by: Robert J. Haas, Jr.
- Succeeded by: Daniel Rizzo

Personal details
- Born: November 21, 1961 (age 64)
- Education: Boston University; Harvard Law School
- Occupation: Lawyer; Mayor; Public agency director City manager

Thomas G. Ambrosino is an American politician and government official who served as Mayor of Revere, Massachusetts from 2000 to 2012, City Manager of Chelsea, Massachusetts from 2015 to 2023, and Court Administrator of the Trial Court for Massachusetts from 2023 to present.

== Early life ==
Ambrosino was born on November 21, 1961, to Frederick and Margaret Ambrosino. His father was a lieutenant with the Revere Police Department and his mother was a kitchen aide at a local nursing home. Ambrosino graduated from Revere High School in 1979. He went on to pursue a bachelor's degree in political science from Boston University in 1983 and a Juris Doctor degree from Harvard Law School in 1986. After passing the bar, Ambrosino spent fourteen years as a practicing attorney. From 1986 to 1994, he was an associate at the Boston firm of Palmer & Dodge. He then ran his independent practice in Revere until he became mayor.

== Politics ==
From 1990 to 1996, Ambrosino was a member of the Revere School Committee. He then served on the Revere City Council from 1996 to 2000.

=== Mayor of Revere ===
In 1999, Ambrosino ran for Mayor of Revere against four-term incumbent Robert J. Haas, Jr. He ran on a platform of limiting taxes and improving education while refraining from sharply criticizing Haas. On November 2, Ambrosino defeated Hass with 7,742 votes to 4,238. John Laidler of The Boston Globe described Ambrosino's 3,504-vote margin of victory as "stunning" and stated that "voters overwhelmingly embraced Ambrosino despite ample evidence that Revere is on the upswing under its current mayor".

Ambrosino made economic development one of his top priorities. During his tenure as Mayor, Saunders Hotel Group, Hampton Inn, and Marriott Residence Inn, all opened new hotels in Revere, Necco constructed a new headquarters in the city, a retail development was built at Suffolk Downs, several small commercial properties were constructed, and plans were announced for a mixed-use project on beachfront land adjacent to the MBTA's Wonderland station.

Also during Ambrosino's tenure, Revere made a number of infrastructure improvements, including the construction of four new schools.

In 2011, Ambrosino chose not to run for reelection, as he felt he had accomplished almost all of the things he had set out to do when he first took office and was feeling a bit worn down by the job.

== Executive director of the Supreme Judicial Court ==
In the fall of 2011, Ambrosino applied for the position of executive director of the Massachusetts Supreme Judicial Court. He was selected out of a pool of over 100 applicants. His hiring was announced on January 4, 2012, two days after leaving office. As executive director of the Supreme Judicial Court, Ambrosino oversaw the day-to-day administration of the Supreme Judicial Court as well as assisting the chief justice for administration and management of the trial court and the court administrator in the overall operation of the trial courts. He received an annual salary of $129,000.

== Chelsea city manager ==
In 2015, Ambrosino and former Portland, Maine city manager Mark Rees were finalists to succeed Jay Ash as city manager of Chelsea, Massachusetts. On June 8, 2015, the Chelsea city council voted 8 to 3 to hire Ambrosino. He negotiated a four-year contract with the council and took office on July 20, 2015.

== Court administrator of the Trial Court for Massachusetts ==
On January 30, 2023, Ambrosino left his previous office and become the Court Administrator of the Trial Court for Massachusetts.
