= Freeman Gill =

- Born: September 5, 1851; Boston, Massachusetts, U.S.
- Died: April 8, 1905 (aged 53); Chelsea, Massachusetts, U.S.
- Burial place: Woodlawn Cemetery and Crematory Everett, Massachusetts
- Military career
- Allegiance: United States
- Branch: United States Navy
- Rank: Gunner's Mate First Class
- Unit: USS Marblehead (C-11)
- Conflicts: Spanish–American War
- Awards: Medal of Honor

Freeman Gill (September 5, 1851 – April 8, 1905) was a Gunner's Mate first class serving in the United States Navy during the Spanish–American War who received the Medal of Honor for bravery.

== Biography ==
Gill was born on September 5, 1851, in Boston, Massachusetts and entering the Navy was sent to fight in the Spanish–American War aboard the USS Marblehead (C-11) as a Gunner's Mate first class.

He died April 8, 1905.

== Medal of Honor citation ==
Rank and organization: Gunner's Mate First Class, U.S. Navy. Born: 5 September 1851, Boston, Mass. Accredited to: Massachusetts. G.O. No.: 55, 19 July 1901.

Citation:

On board the U.S.S. Marblehead during the operation of cutting the cable leading from Cienfuegos, Cuba, 11 May 1898. Facing the heavy fire of the enemy, Gill set an example of extraordinary bravery and coolness throughout this action.

== See also ==
- List of Medal of Honor recipients for the Spanish–American War
