= Arthur B. Champlin =

American politician

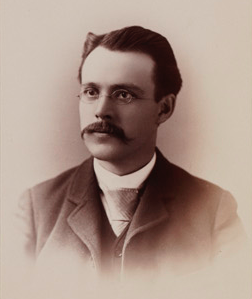

16th Mayor of Chelsea, Massachusetts
- In office 1888–1889
- Preceded by: George E. Mitchell
- Succeeded by: Albert D. Bosson

Member of the Massachusetts State Senate

Member of the Massachusetts House of Representatives
- In office 1887–1888

President of the Chelsea, Massachusetts Common Council
- In office 1885–1886

Member of the Chelsea, Massachusetts Common Council
- In office 1881–1886

Personal details
- Born: February 7, 1858 Chelsea, Massachusetts
- Died: January 8, 1946 (aged 87) Chelsea, Massachusetts
- Party: Republican
- Spouse: Alice M. Roberts
- Children: Norman A. Champlin; Nathan R. Champlin; Marion L. Champlin;
- Profession: Journalist

Arthur Babcock Champlin (February 7, 1858 – January 8, 1946) was a Massachusetts journalist and politician who served in both branches of the Massachusetts legislature, as a city councilor, and as the Mayor of Chelsea, Massachusetts.

== Newspaper career ==
Champlin started out his career in journalism when he became a district reported for The Boston Globe at the age of 16. When The Chelsea Record was started two years later Champlin became one of its managers while still a teenager. In 1886 Champlin became the founder and publisher of The Chelsea Gazette.

Political offices
Preceded by George E. Mitchell	16th Mayor of Chelsea, Massachusetts; 1888–1889	Succeeded by Albert D. Bosson
