= John J. Slater Jr. =

American politician

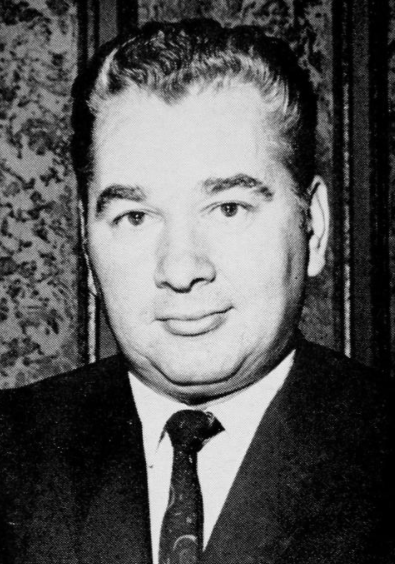

Member of the Massachusetts House of Representatives from the 16th Suffolk district
- In office January 1, 1969 – January 6, 1971
- Preceded by: John F. Donovan Jr.
- Succeeded by: Robert F. Donovan

Mayor of Chelsea, Massachusetts
- In office 1964–1969
- Preceded by: Alfred R. Voke
- Succeeded by: Joseph Margolis

Personal details
- Born: John Joseph Slater Jr. November 27, 1925 Chelsea, Massachusetts
- Died: July 17, 1998 (aged 72) Boston, Massachusetts
- Party: Democratic
- Spouse: Natalie M. Fothergill
- Children: 6
- Education: Boston College (BS, LLB)

Military service
- Branch/service: United States Navy
- Years of service: 1944–1946
- Battles/wars: World War II

John Joseph Slater Jr. (November 25, 1925 – July 17, 1998) was an American lawyer and politician who served as mayor of Chelsea, Massachusetts, and as a member of the Massachusetts House of Representatives.

== Early life ==
Slater was born on November 27, 1925, in Chelsea. During World War II he was a radio operator for the United States Navy in the Pacific theater. Slater graduated from Boston College and Boston College Law School.

== Political career ==
From 1960 to 1963, Slater was a member of the Chelsea board of aldermen. From 1964 to 1969 he was the mayor of Chelsea. He then represented the 16th Suffolk district in the Massachusetts House of Representatives from 1969 to 1971.

During the administration of mayor Kevin White, Slater served as the assistant corporation counsel for the City of Boston. He then served as assistant counsel to the Massachusetts House of Representatives.

== Personal life and death ==
He was married to Natalie M. Fothergill. Together, they had six children. One of his children, John J. Slater III, is also a lawyer. Slater died on July 17, 1998, of pancreatic cancer at Massachusetts General Hospital.
