= Rufus S. Frost =

American politician

Rufus Smith Frost
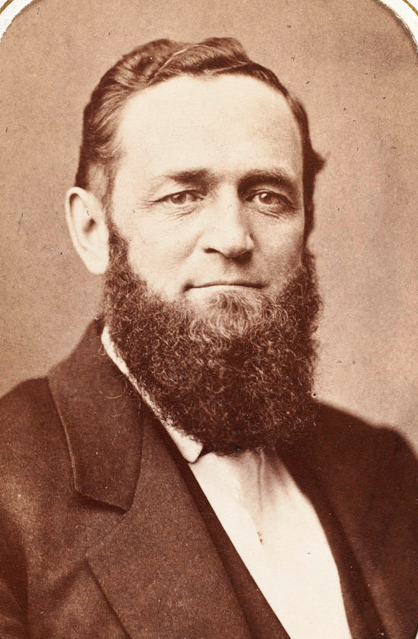

Member of the U.S. House of Representatives from Massachusetts's 4th district
- In office March 4, 1875 – July 28, 1876
- Preceded by: Samuel Hooper
- Succeeded by: Josiah Gardner Abbott

Massachusetts Executive Council Fourth Councilor District
- In office 1873–1874

Massachusetts State Senate First Suffolk District
- In office 1871–1872

5th Mayor of Chelsea, Massachusetts
- In office 1867–1868
- Preceded by: Eustace C. Fitz
- Succeeded by: James B. Forsyth

Personal details
- Born: July 18, 1826 Marlborough, New Hampshire, US
- Died: March 6, 1894 (aged 67) Chicago, Illinois, US
- Resting place: Woodlawn Cemetery, Everett, Massachusetts, US
- Party: Republican
- Spouse(s): Ellen M. Hubbard, Catherine Emily Wickham (m. June 18, 1879)
- Children: John P. Frost, Albert P. frost

Rufus Smith Frost (July 18, 1826 – March 6, 1894) was a U.S. representative from Massachusetts.

Born in Marlborough, New Hampshire to Joseph Frost and Lucy (Wheeler) Frost, the family moved to Boston, Massachusetts, in 1833, where Frost attended the public schools. He engaged in mercantile pursuits and participated in local politics, serving as mayor of Chelsea, Massachusetts, in 1867 and 1868, as a member of the Massachusetts State Senate in 1871 and 1872, and of the Governor's council in 1873 and 1874.

Frost presented credentials as a Republican Member-elect to the Forty-fourth Congress and served from March 4, 1875, until July 28, 1876, when he was succeeded by Josiah G. Abbott, who contested his election. He was an unsuccessful candidate for election in 1876 to the Forty-fifth Congress.

He served as president of the National Association of Woolen Manufacturers from 1877 to 1884, and of the Boston Board of Trade from 1878 to 1880. A patron of the arts, he served as president of the New England Conservatory of Music, and was one of the founders of the New England Law and Order League and of the Boston Art Club. He also served as delegate to the 1892 Republican National Convention.

Frost died in Chicago, Illinois, at the age of 67. He was interred in Woodlawn Cemetery, Everett, Massachusetts.

== See also ==
- 1871 Massachusetts legislature
- 1872 Massachusetts legislature

U.S. House of Representatives
Preceded by Samuel Hooper	Member of the U.S. House of Representatives from Massachusetts's 4th congressional district March 4, 1875 – July 28, 1876	Succeeded by Josiah G. Abbott
Political offices
Preceded by Eustace C. Fitz	5th Mayor of Chelsea, Massachusetts; 1867–1868	Succeeded by James B. Forsyth
