= George Edwin Mitchell =

American mayor

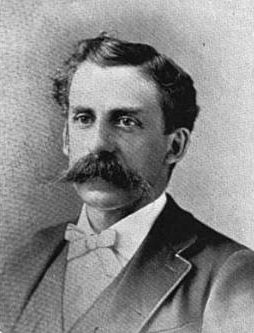

15th Mayor of Chelsea, Massachusetts
- Preceded by: Eugene F. Endicott
- Succeeded by: Arthur B. Champlin
- In office 1885–1886

Personal details
- Born: May 8, 1844 Cambridge, Massachusetts
- Died: September 11, 1911 (aged 67) Chelsea, Massachusetts
- Party: Republican

Military service
- Allegiance: United States of America; Union
- Branch/service: Union Army
- Unit: Somerville Light Infantry; 5th Massachusetts Volunteers
- Battles/wars: American Civil War

George Edwin Mitchell (May 8, 1844 – September 11, 1911) was a Massachusetts politician who served as the fifteenth mayor of Chelsea, Massachusetts.

== Early life ==
Mitchell was son of Lorenzo Dow and Hannah (Hill) Mitchell.

== Notes ==
Political offices
Preceded by Eugene F. Endicott	15th Mayor of Chelsea, Massachusetts; 1883–1884	Succeeded by Arthur B. Champlin
