= Jay Ash =

American politician and basketball player

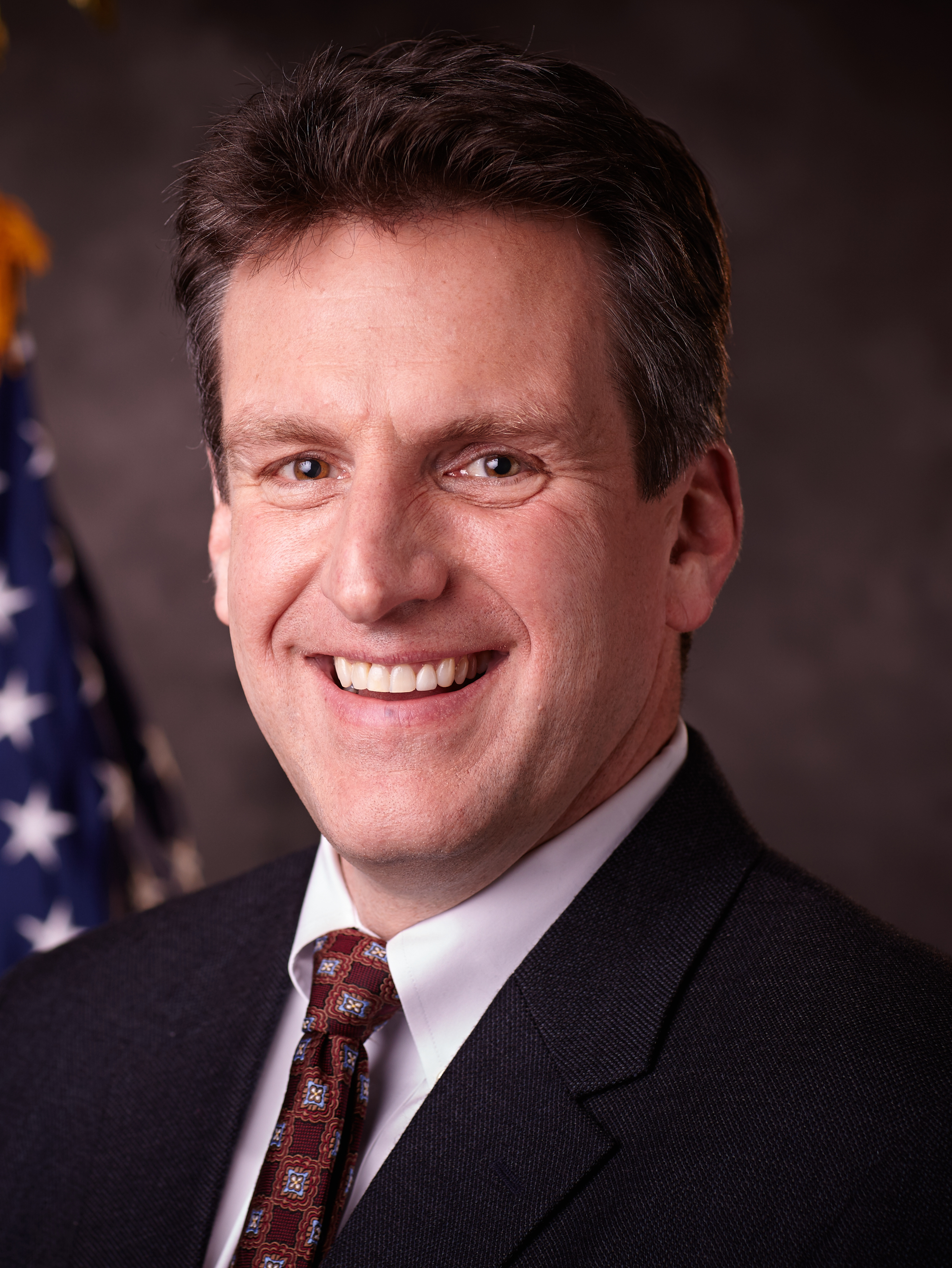
- Official portrait, 2015

Massachusetts Secretary of Housing and Economic Development
- In office January 8, 2015 – December 28, 2018
- Governor: Charlie Baker
- Preceded by: Greg Bialecki
- Succeeded by: Mike Kennealy

City Manager of Chelsea, Massachusetts
- In office September 7, 2000 – December 19, 2014
- Preceded by: Guy A. Santagate
- Succeeded by: Thomas G. Ambrosino

Personal details
- Born: 1961 (age 64–65) Chelsea, Massachusetts
- Party: Democratic
- Spouse: Susan Carney Ash
- Children: 2 sons
- Occupation: City Manager; State cabinet secretary

Robert "Jay" Ash, Jr. (born 1961) is an American political figure who served as Massachusetts Secretary of Housing and Economic Development under Governor Charlie Baker from 2015 to 2018. He previously served as City Manager of Chelsea, Massachusetts.

== Early life ==
Ash was born and raised in Chelsea, Massachusetts. His father was a truck driver, and his mother was a homemaker. His parents divorced when he was ten and Ash lived with his mother. Growing up, his family received welfare for a time and lived in subsidized housing. He graduated from Chelsea High School in 1979, where he was captain of the school's basketball team and a member of its track and cross-country teams. He then attended Clark University where he was also captain of the basketball team. He graduated from Clark in 1983 with a bachelor's degree in government.

== Early career ==
Ash began his career in government in 1984 as an aide to state representative Richard A. Voke. From 1991 to 1996 Ash served as Voke's staff director, who was then the House Majority Leader. In 1996, Voke was defeated in his effort to become Speaker of the House and decided not to run for reelection. Ash then accepted an offer to become Chelsea's Executive Director of Planning and Development. During Ash's tenure as head of Planning and Development, Chelsea attracted sixteen new economic development projects, including the construction of a $17 million, 180-room luxury hotel by Wyndham Hotels & Resorts and built seven new public schools and several new parks.

== City Manager of Chelsea ==
=== Appointment ===
Following the resignation of Guy A. Santagate, Ash applied for the position of Chelsea City Manager. When it came time to appoint a new City Manager, the Chelsea City Council became deadlocked. Six councilors supported Ash and five supported former Mayor of Springfield, Massachusetts Robert Markel (the city charter required seven votes to appoint a city manager). As a result, Chelsea Finance Director Andrew Maylor was named interim city manager after Santagate's contract expired on June 30, 2000. Ash's opponents cited his relationship with Voke, who had been investigated by the United States Attorney's office for corruption, his reluctance to commit to reside in the city (he lived in Saugus, Massachusetts at the time), and his lack of a master's degree in administration or planning as reasons for the opposition. His supporters, however, noted the progress the city had made during his time as Executive Director of Planning and Development. On August 16, 2000, after three weeks of debate and thirteen rounds of voting, Ash was appointed City Manager by a 7 to 4 vote after councilor Calvin T. Brown changed his vote in order to end the standoff.

=== Tenure ===
During Ash's tenure as City Manager, Chelsea saw a number of new development projects, including the construction of Market Basket's flagship supermarket, a local FBI headquarters, new office spaces, several new hotels, 2,000 new housing units, and several apartment buildings, including the One North of Boston luxury apartment complex which included a yoga studio, outdoor pool, and dog day care. Due to its proximity to Boston and lower cost of living, Chelsea saw an influx of new residents, including young professionals. Ash worked to connect Chelsea to the MBTA's Silver Line bus service. He was one of many local officials who successfully lobbied the state government to expand its gambling laws to allow for casinos. Ash was also a supporter of the city's large immigrant community. He issued permits for pro-immigration marches and greeted demonstrators when they marched past City Hall, supported the City Council's decision to declare Chelsea a sanctuary city for illegal immigrants, and welcomed migrant children to the city during the 2014 American immigration crisis. During Ash's tenure, Chelsea won the National Civic League's All-America City Award and its bond rating was upgraded by Standard & Poor's.

Also while Ash was in office, the Executive Director of the Chelsea Housing Authority, Michael E. McLaughlin, pleaded guilty to four felonies. Due to McLaughlin's mismanagement, the Massachusetts Supreme Judicial Court granted a request made by Governor Deval Patrick to appoint a receiver to run the Chelsea Housing Authority. Although Ash did not hire McLaughlin and was never implicated in any wrongdoing at the authority, he did appoint the board tasked with overseeing him.

In addition to serving as City Manager of Chelsea, Ash was also President of the Metropolitan Area Planning Council and a founding member of the Metro Mayors Coalition.

== Secretary of Housing and Economic Development ==
Shortly after he won the 2014 Massachusetts gubernatorial election, Charlie Baker announced that Ash would serve as his Secretary of Housing and Economic Development. Ash's appointment was the first announced by Baker, who hoped that his selection of the Democrat would show his commitment to bipartisanship. He stepped down as Chelsea City Manager on December 19, 2014 and was sworn in by Baker on January 8, 2015, shortly after Baker's own inauguration.

The Boston Globe jointly named Ash, John Barros, Steve Kadish, and Dan Koh its 2016 "Bostonians of the Year", crediting them with having been behind the deal which brought General Electric's headquarters to the city, each having done so, "with marching orders from their bosses".

After serving in the Baker administration for nearly four years, Ash announced on December 18, 2018 that he would be stepping down from the position effective December 28, 2018 to become CEO of the Massachusetts Competitive Partnership, a nonprofit organization of local industry leaders that promotes economic growth in Massachusetts. Ash was replaced by Mike Kennealy on January 2, 2019. Kennealy previously served as Ash's assistant secretary for business growth.
