= Edward W. Hathaway =

- Born: July 9, 1839; Plymouth, Massachusetts
- Died: April 6, 1916 (aged 76)
- Burial place: Woodlawn Cemetery; Everett, Massachusetts
- Military career
- Allegiance: United States
- Branch: United States Navy
- Rank: Seaman
- Unit: (United States Navy) USS Sciota
- Conflicts: American Civil War; Siege of Vicksburg
- Awards: Medal of Honor

Edward W. Hathaway (July 9, 1839 – April 6, 1916) was a Union Navy sailor in the American Civil War who received the U.S. military's highest decoration, the Medal of Honor.

Born on July 9, 1839, in Plymouth, Massachusetts, Hathaway was still living in that city when he joined the Navy. He served during the Civil War as a seaman on the USS Sciota. On June 28, 1862, Sciota was heading down the Mississippi River to participate in an attack on Vicksburg when it came under heavy fire. Hathaway "displayed exceptional courage" after being severely wounded. For this action, he was awarded the Medal of Honor five years later on October 3, 1867.

Hathaway's official Medal of Honor citation reads:

On board the U.S.S. Sciota prior to the battle Vicksburg, on 28 June 1862. Struck by a bullet which severed his left arm above the elbow, Hathaway displayed exceptional courage as his ship sustained numerous damaging hits from stem to stern while proceeding down the river to fight the battle of Vicksburg.

Hathaway died on April 6, 1916, at age 76 and was buried in Everett, Massachusetts.

== See also ==
- USS Sciota
- Siege of Vicksburg
