= Thomas Strahan =

American politician

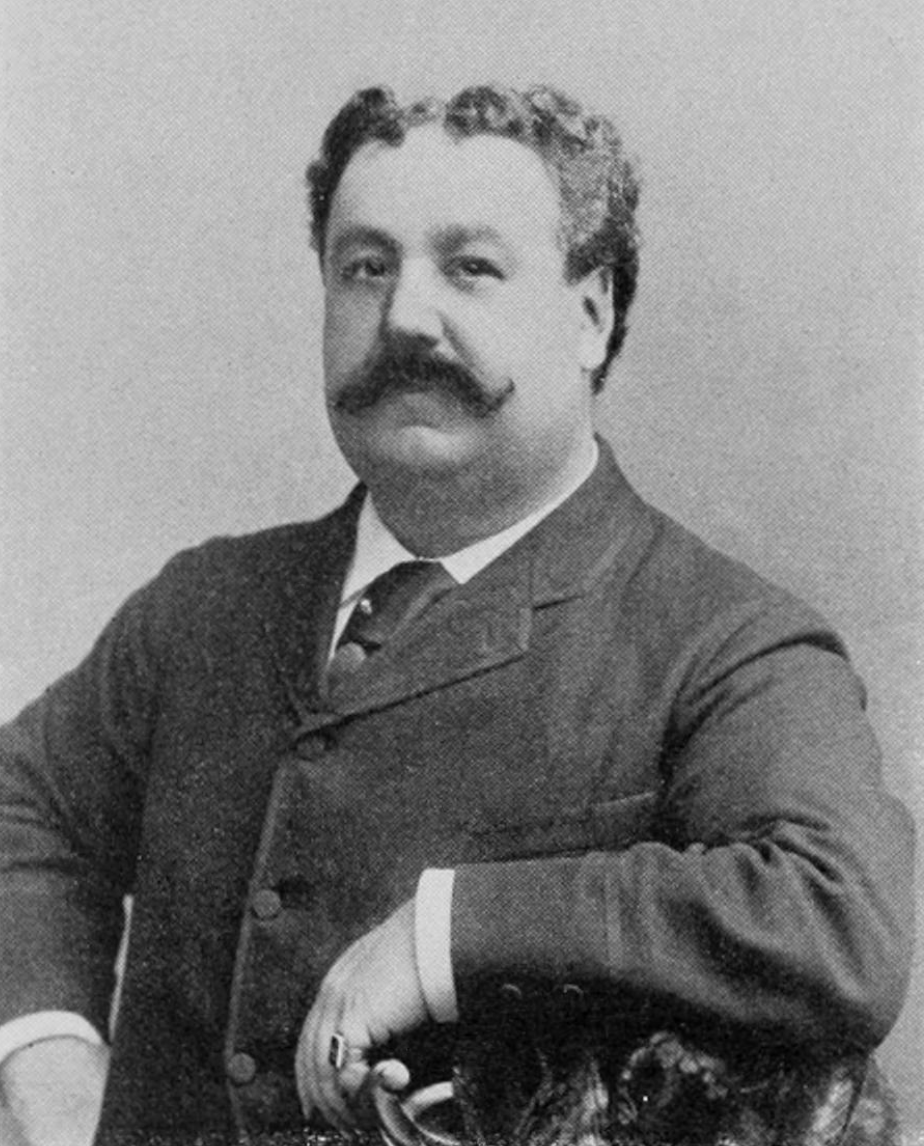

Member of the Massachusetts House of Representatives
- In office 1884

13th Mayor of Chelsea, Massachusetts
- In office 1883–1884
- Preceded by: Samuel P. Tenney
- Succeeded by: Eugene F. Endicott

President of the Chelsea, Massachusetts Common Council
- In office 1882–1883

Member of the Chelsea, Massachusetts Common Council
- In office 1880–1883

Personal details
- Born: May 10, 1847 Stirling, Scotland
- Died: December 19, 1910 (aged 63) Brookline, Massachusetts, United States
- Party: Republican
- Spouse: Esther Lawrence (m. 1867)
- Education: Phillips Exeter Academy
- Profession: Wallpaper manufacturer

Thomas Strahan (May 10, 1847 – December 19, 1910) was a Massachusetts businessman and politician who served as the thirteenth Mayor of Chelsea, Massachusetts and in the Massachusetts House of Representatives.

== Biography ==
Thomas Straham was born in Stirling, Scotland on May 10, 1847. He was educated at the Cotting Academy in Arlington, Virginia, and at Phillips Exeter Academy.

He married Esther Lawrence on November 28, 1867, and they had six children.

A Republican, he served on the Common Council of Chelsea, Massachusetts from 1880 to 1883, and was its president in the latter year. He was elected Chelsea's mayor in 1883, and was a member of the Massachusetts House of Representatives in 1884.

He died in Brookline, Massachusetts on December 19, 1910.

== Thomas Strahan Company ==
Strahan formed the Thomas Strahan Company in 1866. Thomas Strahan is one of the oldest wallpaper companies in America.

== Notes ==
Political offices
Preceded by Samuel P. Tenney	13th Mayor of Chelsea, Massachusetts; 1883-1884	Succeeded by Eugene F. Endicott
