= Russell C. Elliott =

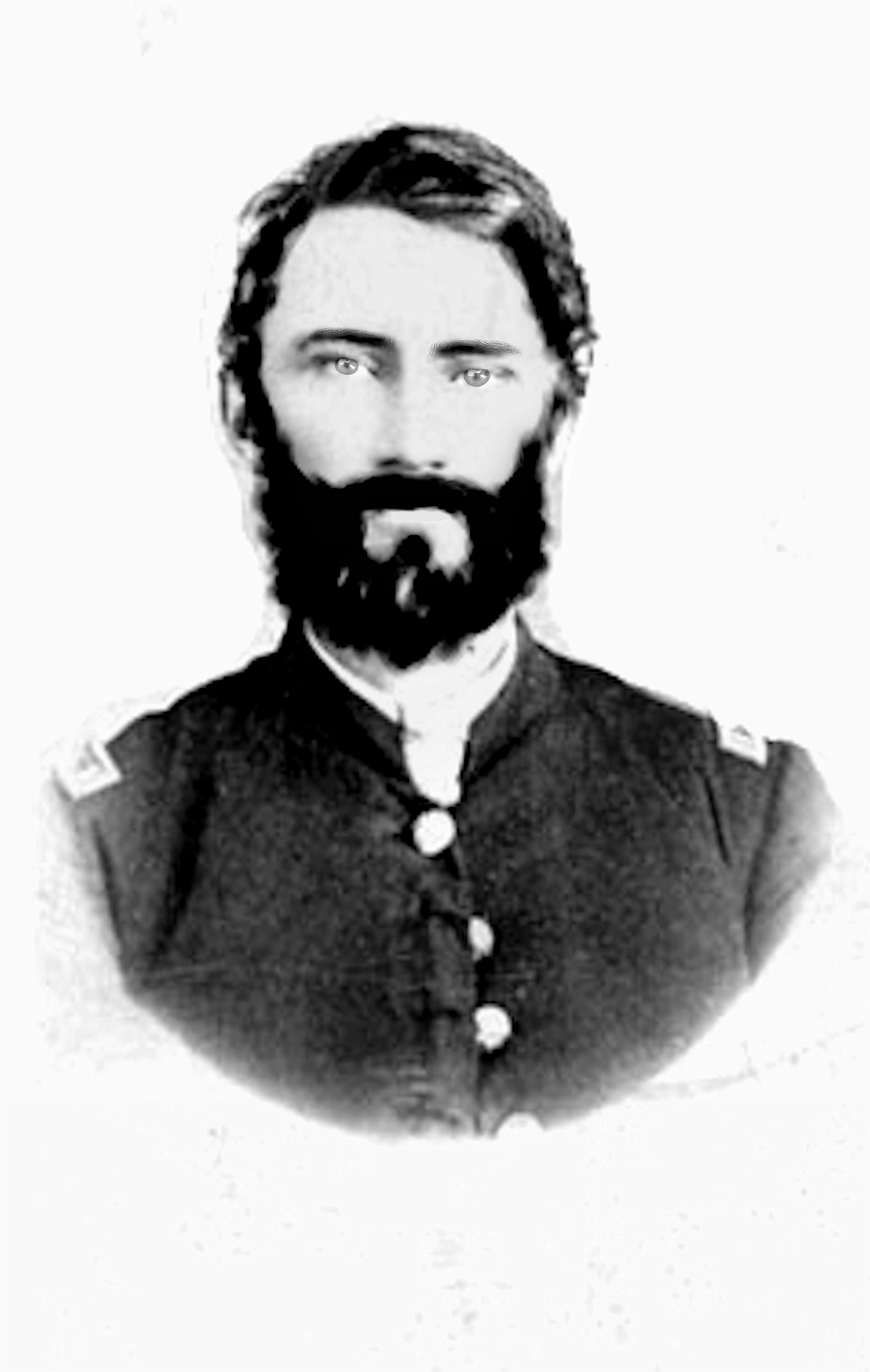
- Medal of Honor Winner Russell C. Elliott
- Born: 1842; Concord, New Hampshire, US
- Died: October 23, 1898 (aged 55–56); Everett, Massachusetts, US
- Burial place: Woodlawn Cemetery and Crematory, Everett, Massachusetts
- Military career
- Allegiance: United States
- Branch: US Army
- Service years: 1862–1865
- Rank: Sergeant; Second Lieutenant
- Units: Company B, 3rd Massachusetts Volunteer Cavalry
- Awards: Medal of Honor

Russell C. Elliott (1842–October 23, 1898) was a Union soldier who fought in the American Civil War. Elliott received the country's highest award for bravery during combat, the Medal of Honor, for his action at Natchitoches, Louisiana, on 19 April 1864. He was honored with the award on 20 November 1896.

== Biography ==
Elliott was born in Concord, New Hampshire in 1842. He joined the Army from Boston in August 1862. He was commissioned as a Second Lieutenant in December 1864 and mustered out with his regiment in September 1865. Elliott died on 23 October 1898, and his remains are interred at Woodlawn Cemetery and Crematory in Everett, Massachusetts.

== Medal of Honor citation ==
The President of the United States of America, in the name of Congress, takes pleasure in presenting the Medal of Honor to Sergeant Russell C. Elliott, United States Army, for extraordinary heroism on 19 April 1864, while serving with Company B, 3d Massachusetts Cavalry, in action at Natchitoches, Louisiana. Seeing a Confederate officer in advance of his command, Sergeant Elliott charged on him alone and unaided and captured him.

== See also ==
- List of American Civil War Medal of Honor recipients: A–F
