= Lawrence F. Quigley =

American politician (1893–1948)

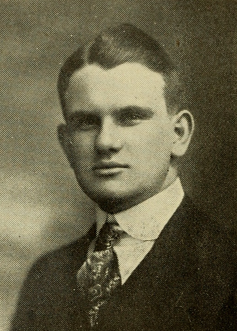

Mayor of Chelsea, Massachusetts
- In office 1932–1935
- Preceded by: John J. Whalen
- Succeeded by: Edward J. Voke
- In office 1928–1929
- Preceded by: John J. Whalen
- Succeeded by: John J. Whalen
- In office 1922–1926
- Preceded by: Melvin B. Breath
- Succeeded by: John J. Whalen

Personal details
- Born: September 15, 1893 Chelsea, Massachusetts, U.S.
- Died: December 19, 1948 (aged 55) Boston, Massachusetts, U.S.
- Resting place: Holy Cross Cemetery; Malden, Massachusetts
- Party: Democratic
- Children: 4, including Andrew P. Quigley

Lawrence Francis Quigley (September 15, 1893 – December 19, 1948) was an American politician who was mayor of Chelsea, Massachusetts from 1922 to 1926, 1928 to 1929, and 1932 to 1935.

== Early life ==
Quigley was born in Chelsea on September 15, 1893. During World War I, he was a commissary steward in the United States Navy. After the war, he worked as a salesman and was secretary of a Boston clothing business. He was the first commander of the Chelsea American Legion post.

== Career ==
Quigley represented the 23rd Suffolk district in the Massachusetts House of Representatives in 1917 and 1918. In the 1921 Chelsea mayoral election, he defeated Alton E. Briggs, a former member of the Chelsea board of control, by 1554 votes. He was reelected in 1922, 1923, and 1924.

Quigley was a delegate to the 1924 Democratic National Convention, where he gained national attention for his fight against the Ku Klux Klan. During a debate over the League of Nations, he was punched by a fellow Massachusetts delegate, John H. Backus.

On August 6, 1925, Quigley and 43 others were indicted for violating the Volstead Act. Despite the indictment, he was reelected that December by a larger majority than the previous election. Six defendants pleaded guilty before the trial and United States Attorney Harold P. Williams requested directed verdicts of not guilty for seven members of the Chelsea police department. The first trial ended on March 6, 1926, in a hung jury, with 11 favoring conviction and one opposed. A second trial resulted in the conviction of five of the defendants, including Quigley's brother, Thomas, and the acquittal of six. Once again, the jury was unable to come to an agreement on Quigley's guilt.

Quigley was a candidate for the United States House of Representatives seat in Massachusetts's 10th congressional district in the 1926 election. He finished second in the four-candidate Democratic primary behind incumbent John J. Douglass. Despite pledging not to seek another term as mayor, he ran as a sticker candidate in that December's election. He finished second behind John J. Whalen, but ahead of primary runner-up Maurice Caro. He ran again in 1927 and defeated Whalen by 939 votes. The pair faced off again in 1929 and this time Whalen was victorious by 157 votes. Whalen did not run for reelection in 1931 and Quigley defeated state representative John W. MacLeod by 1342 votes to return to the mayor's office. He was reelected in 1933 over state representative William H. Melley.

== Later career ==
Quigley was appointed commandant of the Chelsea Soldiers' Home on December 27, 1934 and took office on January 1, 1935. He served out the remainder of his term as mayor while running the Soldiers' Home. From 1946 to 1947, he was state commander of the American Legion.

== Personal life and death ==
In 1921, Quigley married Zita Lawlor. She was a trustee of the Chelsea Public Library for over 40 years and a member of the Chelsea School Committee during the 1940s. They had four children, including Andrew P. Quigley, who also served as mayor of Chelsea.

Quigley died on December 19, 1948, at Massachusetts General Hospital, following a long illness.
