= Warren Alpert =

American entrepreneur and philanthropist

- Born: December 2, 1920; Chelsea, Massachusetts
- Died: March 3, 2007 (aged 86); Manhattan, New York
- Resting place: Woburn, Massachusetts
- Education: Boston University; Harvard Business School
- Honours: Purple Heart

Warren Alpert (December 2, 1920 – March 3, 2007) was an American entrepreneur and philanthropist. Born to poor immigrant parents, he served in U.S. military intelligence during World War II. His privately held businesses distributed gasoline, tobacco and food, and operated a chain of convenience stores and gas stations in the Northeastern United States. He gave away much of his fortune to support medical research at universities and hospitals, donating hundreds of millions of dollars.

== Early life and education ==
Alpert was born in Chelsea, Massachusetts on December 2, 1920. His parents, Goodman Alpert and Tina Horowitz Alpert, were immigrants from Lithuania, and his father worked as a peddler selling dry goods. He was the youngest of five children. At age 13, Alpert started selling towels and sheets out of the trunk of his father's car. He graduated from Chelsea High School and sold hats after school. He worked seven days a week while earning his bachelor's degree from Boston University College of Arts and Sciences, graduating in 1942. He served in military intelligence during World War II, was wounded on Omaha Beach during the D-Day invasion of France, and received a Purple Heart. After the war, he attended Harvard Business School on the GI Bill, and earned a Master of Business Administration in 1947.

== Business career ==
Alpert worked for Standard Oil of California for several years before returning to the east coast to start his own business in 1950. He had a used car, $1000 in savings and a $9000 loan from an older brother, Benjamin Alpert. Initially, he owned and operated a dry goods store, and then he bought and operated some gas stations. He was soon able to pay back the loan his brother had given him. His business, Warren Equities Inc. was headquartered in Providence, Rhode Island. Gradually, he expanded into distribution of gasoline, food and tobacco in the wholesale and retail markets, and he established a chain of gas stations and convenience stores called Xtra Mart, operating in New England, New York and Pennsylvania. According to industry analysts, most Xtra Marts "are located in close-knit rural communities where each store serves as a sort of town center." The Xtra Mart chain grew to over 250 locations under his leadership. His privately held businesses had no long term debt and had annual sales of $2 billion at the time of his death.

Alpert stepped down from active management of his businesses in 1993, turning over control to his nephew, Herbert Kaplan.

== Philanthropy ==
In 1974, Alpert donated money to Boston University to convert a parking lot to a tree lined park with a grassy berm to cut down on traffic noise. The park is named the Warren Alpert Mall, but is commonly called the BU Beach. He also donated money to the Harvard Business School, the Albert Einstein College of Medicine and the Sutton Place Synagogue in Manhattan.

In 1986, he established the Warren Alpert Foundation with the goal of improving the health of the public.

In 1993, Alpert donated $20 million to the Harvard Medical School. At that time, he said, "I want cures, cures for cancer, Alzheimer's and AIDS", adding that he was donating to Harvard because he thought they were most likely to discover the cures. In 2000, he donated $15 million to Mount Sinai Hospital in Manhattan.

In 2007, five weeks before his death, Alpert donated $100 million to the medical school at Brown University in Providence, the city where his business was headquartered.

== Personal life ==
Alpert was never married. He was an outgoing man of simple tastes who did not own a yacht or a private plane or employ a chauffeur. According to his nephew Herbert Kaplan, "he had a tremendous zeal for life" and would wear a red tie to a black tie event, enjoying the attention. In his later years, Alpert turned management of his businesses over to Kaplan, and continued to live at the Ritz Tower in Manhattan.

Alpert died at Mount Sinai Hospital in Manhattan on March 3, 2007. He was buried in Woburn, Massachusetts.

== Legacy ==
The Warren Alpert Medical School at Brown University is named after him. His foundation, in cooperation with Harvard, operates the Warren Alpert Foundation Prize, which awards $500,000 to teams of outstanding medical researchers annually.
