= Greg Bialecki =

American attorney and government figure (1960–2024)

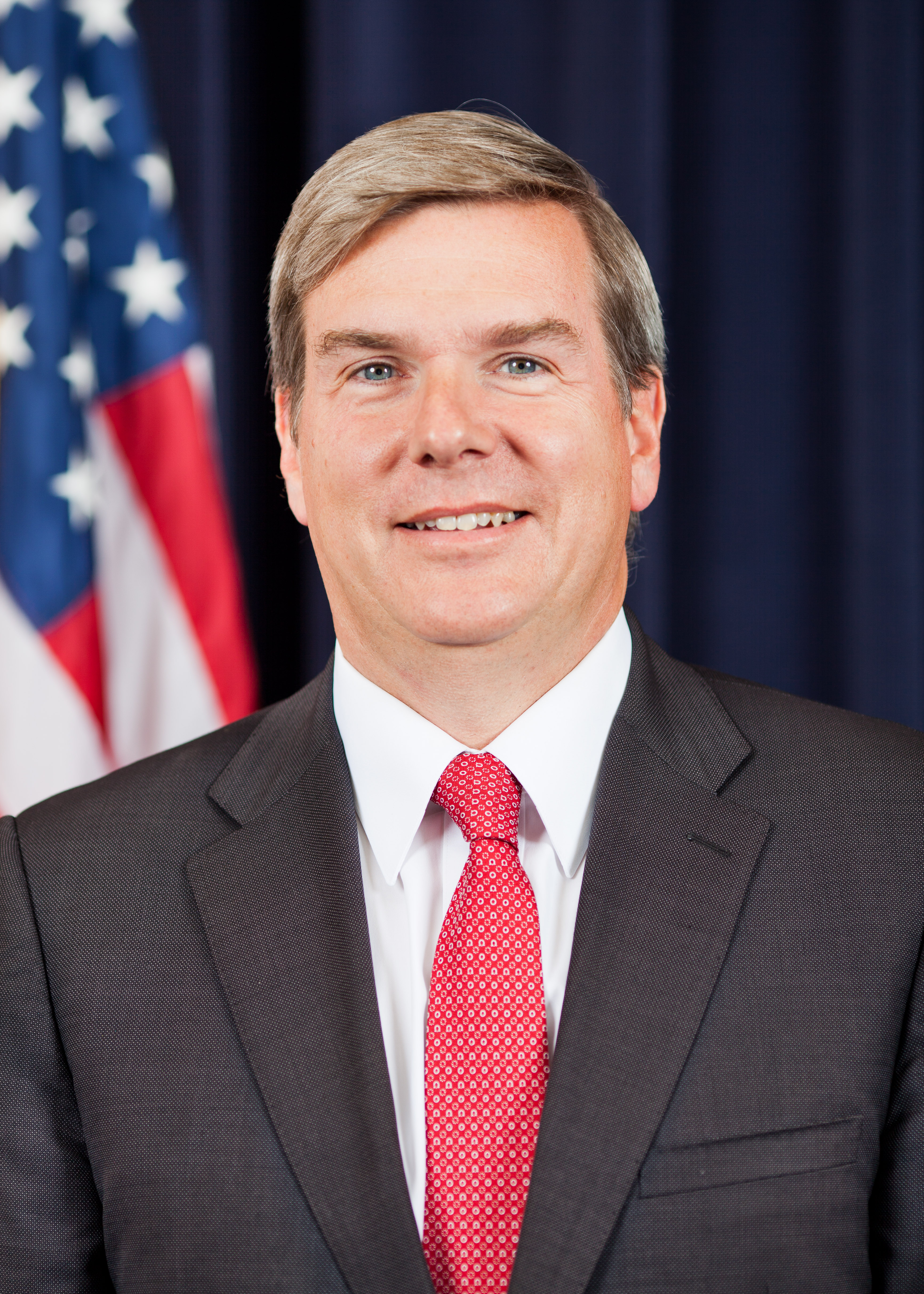
- Official portrait, 2013

Massachusetts Secretary of Housing and Economic Development
- In office 2009–2015
- Governor: Deval Patrick
- Preceded by: Ranch C. Kimball
- Succeeded by: Jay Ash

Personal details
- Born: August 12, 1960 New Haven, Connecticut, U.S.
- Died: November 14, 2024 (aged 64) Newton, Massachusetts, U.S.
- Party: Democratic
- Children: 4
- Education: Harvard College; Harvard Law School
- Profession: Attorney

Greg Bialecki (August 12, 1960 – November 14, 2024) was an American attorney and government figure who served as Massachusetts Secretary of Housing and Economic Development under Governor Deval Patrick from 2009 to 2015. Prior to serving as secretary, Bialecki was Undersecretary of Business Development and spent twenty years as a real estate and environmental attorney at the law firms Hill & Barlow and DLA Piper.

Bialecki attended Harvard University for both his undergraduate studies and law school. In 2009 Bialecki was tapped to head up the Governor's efforts to bring controversial casino gambling to Massachusetts. The Boston Globe reported in 2011 that Bialecki may have violated state ethics laws by purchasing stock in two casinos during the time at which he was helping to craft legislation that would benefit those companies. Bialecki sold the stocks at a 30 percent profit only after being contacted by The Globe. Bialecki and Governor Deval Patrick came under fire for failing to investigate Assistant Secretary for Policy and Planning Carl Stanley McGee (Stan McGee), their point man on casino legislation and negotiating a state casino compact with an Indian tribe, following his 2007 arrest in Florida where he was charged with sexually assaulting a 12- to 15-year-old boy.

Bialecki died in Newton, Massachusetts, on November 14, 2024, at the age of 64.
