= Woodlawn Cemetery (Everett, Massachusetts) =

Rural cemetery in Middlesex County, Massachusetts, US

Coordinates: 42.419°N 71.036°W

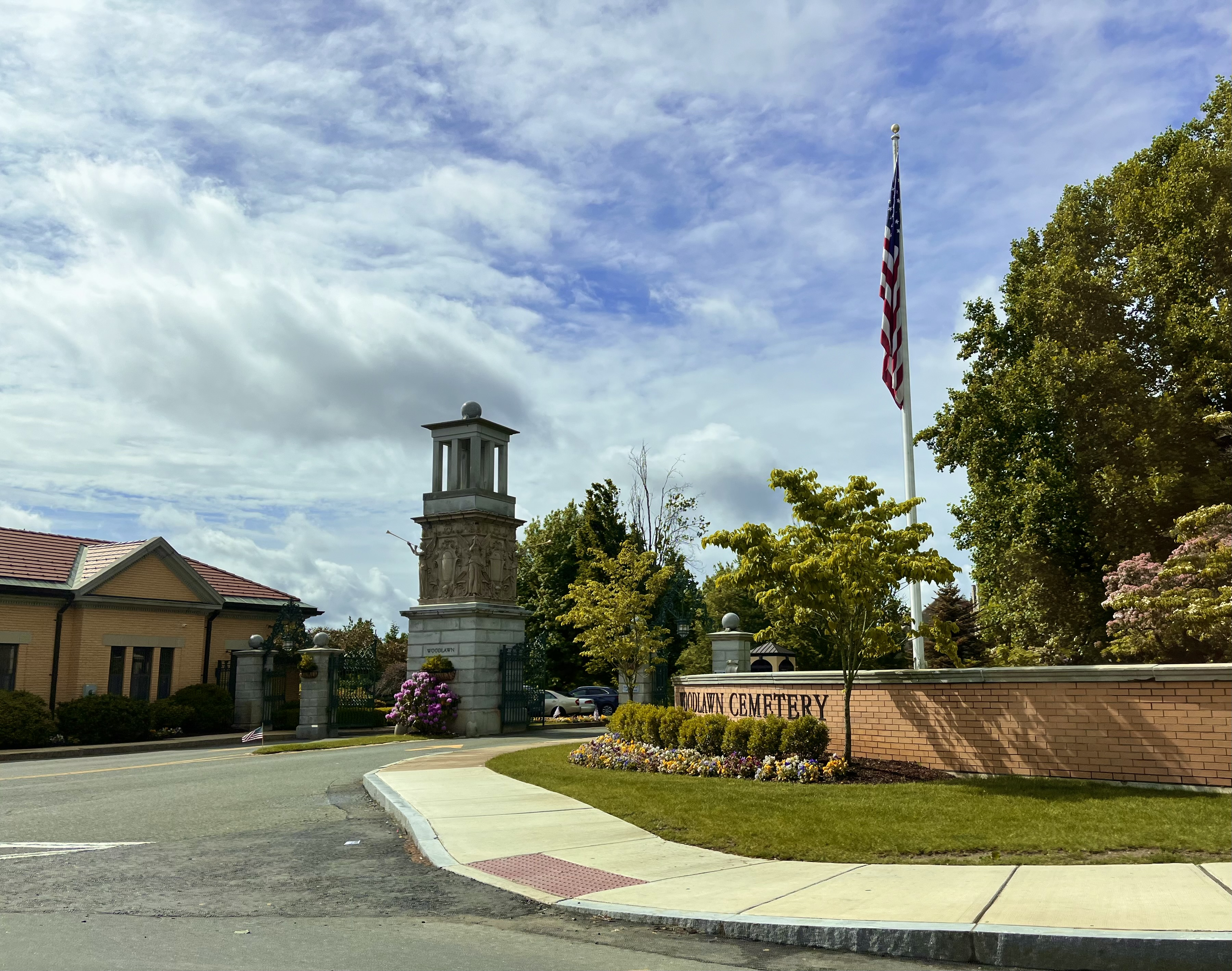
Woodlawn Cemetery

Woodlawn Cemetery is an American rural cemetery in Everett, Massachusetts. It is the third-oldest rural cemetery in Greater Boston.

== History ==
On August 31, 1850, the Woodlawn Cemetery corporation was organized to purchase land for and establish a cemetery. In 1851, the corporation purchased an 80-acre parcel of land that was primarily situated in Malden, Massachusetts, but also included a portion in the town of North Chelsea (now known as Revere, Massachusetts). In 1870, a part of Malden which included Woodlawn Cemetery was set off from the town and incorporated into as town of Everett.

The cemetery was inspired by Mount Auburn Cemetery and many of Woodlawn's founding directors also served on the Mount Auburn board. Henry Weld Fuller, a member of the Massachusetts Horticultural Society, was cemetery's chief designer. The cemetery featured extensive rockwork, rustic work, and plantings, and included a gatehouse, well-house, rustic archway, receiving tombs, artificial pond, and a 30-foot tall great tower. In 1998, the cemetery had 200 varieties of trees and 124,000 plants on the graves and the traffic islands.

Woodlawn Cemetery was consecrated on July 2, 1851. The exercises consisted of a chant of Psalm 23, a reading of the scriptures by Rev. J. P. Langworthy of Chelsea, a prayer by William Ives Budington, an original hymn by Rev. J. H. Clinch of Boston, an address by George Edward Ellis, a hymn by H. W. Fuller, and a prayer and benediction by Rev. Levi Tucker of Boston. The first person buried in Woodlawn Cemetery was Augustus F. Bowen, who was interred on July 3, 1851.

By June 1, 1856, Woodlawn Cemetery had 948 interments. By 1868, half of Woodlawn's burial plots had been sold, so the cemetery expanded by acquired an adjoining 75-acre property. A greenhouse was constructed on this lot and the house on this property was repaired and used as a residence for the cemetery's gardener. In 1905, the Woodlawn Cemetery corporation purchased a 1.5 acre property on Elm Street to complete its frontage on Woodlawn Square.

In 1910, construction began on a new chapel at the entrance to the cemetery. The concrete and granite Gothic revival building was designed by Loring & Phipps. The children of Elisha S. Converse, a former president of the corporation, donated $15,000 of the $25,000 needed for the construction. The remaining $10,000 came from contributions from around 700 other lot owners. The chapel was dedicated on September 16, 1911

In 1998, Woodlawn Cemetery completed a major capital improvement program, which included the construction of its new reception area, Patton Hall, and the refurbishment of the chapel.

== Notable burials ==
- John L. Bates, Governor of Massachusetts (1903–1905)
- James Benson, one of five Medal of Honor winners buried in Woodlawn Cemetery
- Howard Adams Carson, civil engineer and pioneer of tunnel construction
- Leonard B. Chandler, businessman and politician
- Eunice Hale Cobb, writer, public speaker, and activist
- Elisha S. Converse, businessman, philanthropist, and the first mayor of Malden, Massachusetts
- Mary Parker Converse, philanthropist and the first woman to be commissioned by the United States Merchant Marine
- Joseph DiCarlo, politician
- Mary Elvira Elliott, writer, lecturer
- Russell C. Elliott, Medal of Honor winner
- Francis B. Fay, member of the United States House of Representatives (1852–1853) and first mayor of Chelsea, Massachusetts (1857)
- Rufus S. Frost, member of the United States House of Representatives (1875–1876)
- Freeman Gill, Medal of Honor winner
- Edward W. Hathaway, Medal of Honor winner
- Harriet Hayden, Black abolitionist
- Lewis Hayden, Black abolitionist, member of the Massachusetts House of Representatives
- William H. Howe, Medal of Honor winner
- Hester C. Jeffrey, African-American activist, suffragist, and community organizer in Rochester, New York, and New York City
- Hermon Atkins MacNeil, sculptor
- Mary Eliza Mahoney, first African-American to study and work as a professionally trained nurse in the United States
- Hugh J. McLaughlin, mayor of Chelsea, Massachusetts (1956–1959)
- Paul McCullough, comedian
- Ann Frasier Norton, U.S. Navy sailor during World War I. First woman to be buried with full military honors
- Henry Oxley, baseball player
- Emily Rebecca Page, poet and editor
- Mary Ann Brown Patten, first female commander of an American merchant vessel
- Nancy Gardner Prince, author
- William Matthew Prior, folk artist
- Andrew P. Quigley, newspaper publisher and politician
- Ernest W. Roberts, member of the United States House of Representatives (1899–1917)
- John Rock, abolitionist
- Edward J. Voke, mayor of Chelsea, Massachusetts (1936–1941)
- Joseph Frank Wehner, World War I flying ace
- William Allan Wilde, state representative
