= Joseph Margolis (politician) =

American politician (1919–1983)

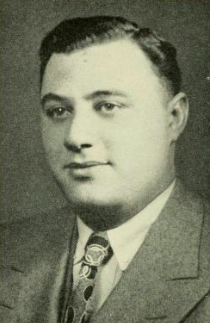

Mayor of Chelsea, Massachusetts
- In office January 5, 1970 – December 29, 1970
- Preceded by: John J. Slater Jr.
- Succeeded by: Charles W. DeIorio

Member of the Massachusetts House of Representatives for the 23rd Suffolk district
- In office 1941–1945
- Preceded by: Joseph A. Melley
- Succeeded by: Patrick F. Cronin

Personal details
- Born: September 28, 1908 Lawrence, Massachusetts, U.S.
- Died: December 27, 1970 (aged 62) Everett, Massachusetts, U.S.
- Party: Democratic

Joseph H. Margolis (September 28, 1908 – December 29, 1970) was an American politician who served as mayor of Chelsea, Massachusetts in 1970.

Margolis was born on September 28, 1908, in Lawrence, Massachusetts. He attended Chelsea Public Schools and worked as a salesman outside of politics. He began his political career in 1933 as an unsuccessful candidate for the Chelsea board of aldermen. Two years later he won the ward 2 seat by 61 votes. In 1940, Margolis was elected to the Massachusetts House of Representatives. He left the house after two terms and enlisted in the United States Navy. He was a chief petty officer with the Seabees in World War II. After the war, Margolis served multiple terms on the Chelsea board of aldermen and was assistant sergeant-at-arms and doorkeeper of the Massachusetts House of Representatives. In 1943, 1959, and 1963, Margolis was an unsuccessful candidate for mayor. In 1969, Margolis achieved his longtime ambition of becoming mayor of Chelsea. He was the city's first Jewish mayor. 358 days into his first term, Margolis died suddenly at Whidden Memorial Hospital in Everett, Massachusetts. He was 62 years old.
