= Hermon W. Pratt =

American politician

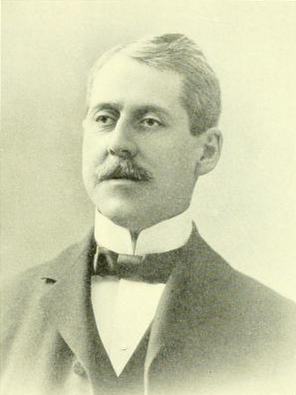

21st Mayor of Chelsea, Massachusetts
- In office 1897–1897
- Preceded by: John C. Loud
- Succeeded by: Seth J. Littlefield
- Majority: 2,305

Member of the Chelsea, Massachusetts Board of Aldermen
- In office 1895–1896

Member of the Chelsea, Massachusetts Board of Aldermen
- In office 1888–1887

Personal details
- Born: July 20, 1845
- Died: May 2, 1918 Everett, Massachusetts
- Party: Republican

Hermon W. Pratt (July 20, 1845 – May 2, 1918) was a Massachusetts politician who served as the 21st Mayor of Chelsea, Massachusetts.

== Chelsea City Council and Board of Aldermen ==
Pratt was on the Chelsea city council from 1884 to 1886, and on the Chelsea Board of Aldermen in 1887–88 and 1895–96.

== Election as Mayor of Chelsea ==
In 1896 Pratt ran for Mayor of Chelsea, Massachusetts. In the Chelsea Republican caucuses held on November 24, 1896, Pratt received the Republican nomination Mayor of Chelsea, beating Seth J. Littlefield by 214 Votes. In December 1896 Pratt was elected Mayor of Chelsea by a Plurality of 2,305 votes over John T Hadaway President of the Chelsea Board of Aldermen. In November 1897 Pratt announced that he would not be a candidate for reelection.

== Chelsea Board of Trade ==
After he was mayor Pratt served as the President of the Chelsea Board of Trade.

== Death ==
Pratt died May 2, 1918 at Whidden Hospital, Everett, Massachusetts, as a result of illness with which he was stricken on April 16, 1918.

Political offices
Preceded by John C. Loud	21st Mayor of Chelsea, Massachusetts; 1897	Succeeded by Seth J. Littlefield
