= Hugh J. McLaughlin (politician) =

American politician (1915–2014)

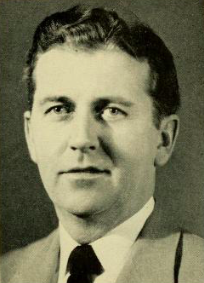

Mayor of Chelsea, Massachusetts
- In office 1956–1959
- Preceded by: Andrew P. Quigley
- Succeeded by: Alfred R. Voke

Personal details
- Born: September 27, 1915 Chelsea, Massachusetts, U.S.
- Died: September 24, 2014 (aged 98) Naples, Florida, U.S.
- Resting place: Woodlawn Cemetery; Everett, Massachusetts
- Party: Democratic
- Education: Bates College
- Occupation: Police officer Food broker

Hugh J. McLaughlin (September 27, 1915 – September 24, 2014) was an American politician who served as mayor of Chelsea, Massachusetts from 1956 to 1959.

== Early life ==
McLaughlin was born on September 27, 1915, in Chelsea. His father was a member of the Chelsea board of aldermen. McLaughlin graduated from Immaculate Conception High School in Revere, Massachusetts, Bridgton Academy, and Bates College. He served in the United States Navy during World War II and after his discharge became a Chelsea police officer. He left law enforcement to start a food brokerage business.

== Politics ==
In 1953, McLaughlin ran for public office for the first time and was the top vote-getter in the Chelsea alderman-at-large race. In 1954, he was elected to the Massachusetts House of Representatives. The following year he defeated incumbent 8,419 votes to 7,042 to become mayor of Chelsea. He was reelected by a large margin in 1957 and did not run for a third term in 1959. In 1962, McLaughlin was an unsuccessful candidate for the 1st Suffolk district seat in the Massachusetts Senate.
