= William M. Robinson =

American politician

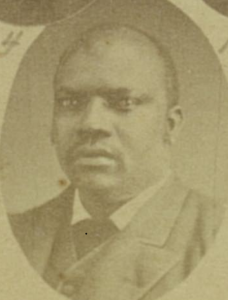

Member of the Mississippi House of Representatives
- In office 1884–1885

Personal details
- Born: c. 1946
- Profession: Politician

William M. Robinson was a state legislator in Mississippi. He represented Hinds County, Mississippi in the Mississippi House of Representatives in 1884 and 1885.

He was born in Mississippi. He married. He lived in Raymond, Mississippi.

== See also ==
- African American officeholders from the end of the Civil War until before 1900
