= Ann Frasier Norton =

Ann Frasier Norton (April 10, 1893 – October 10, 1918) was a Yeomanette who served in the United States Navy during World War I. She was the first woman to be buried with full military honors.

== Early life ==
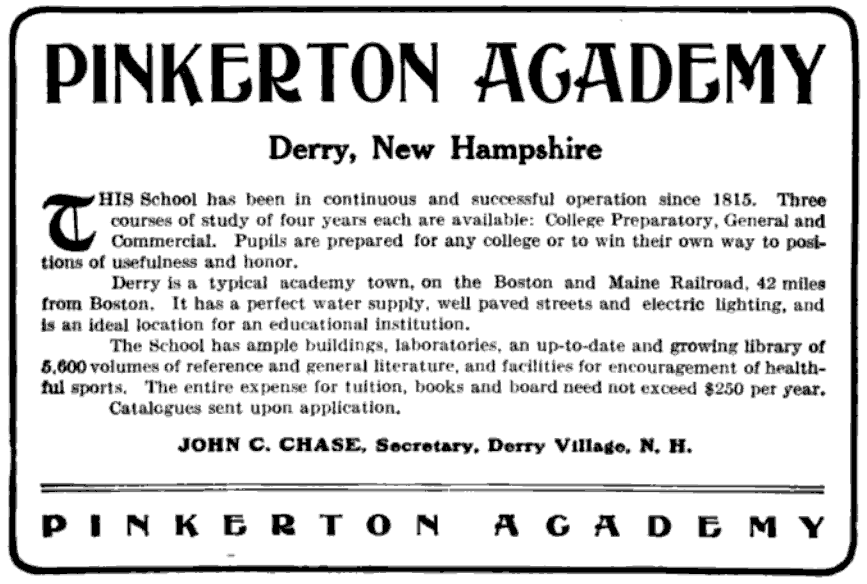
Advert from Pinkerton Academy, a school attended by Norton before her service in the U.S. Navy

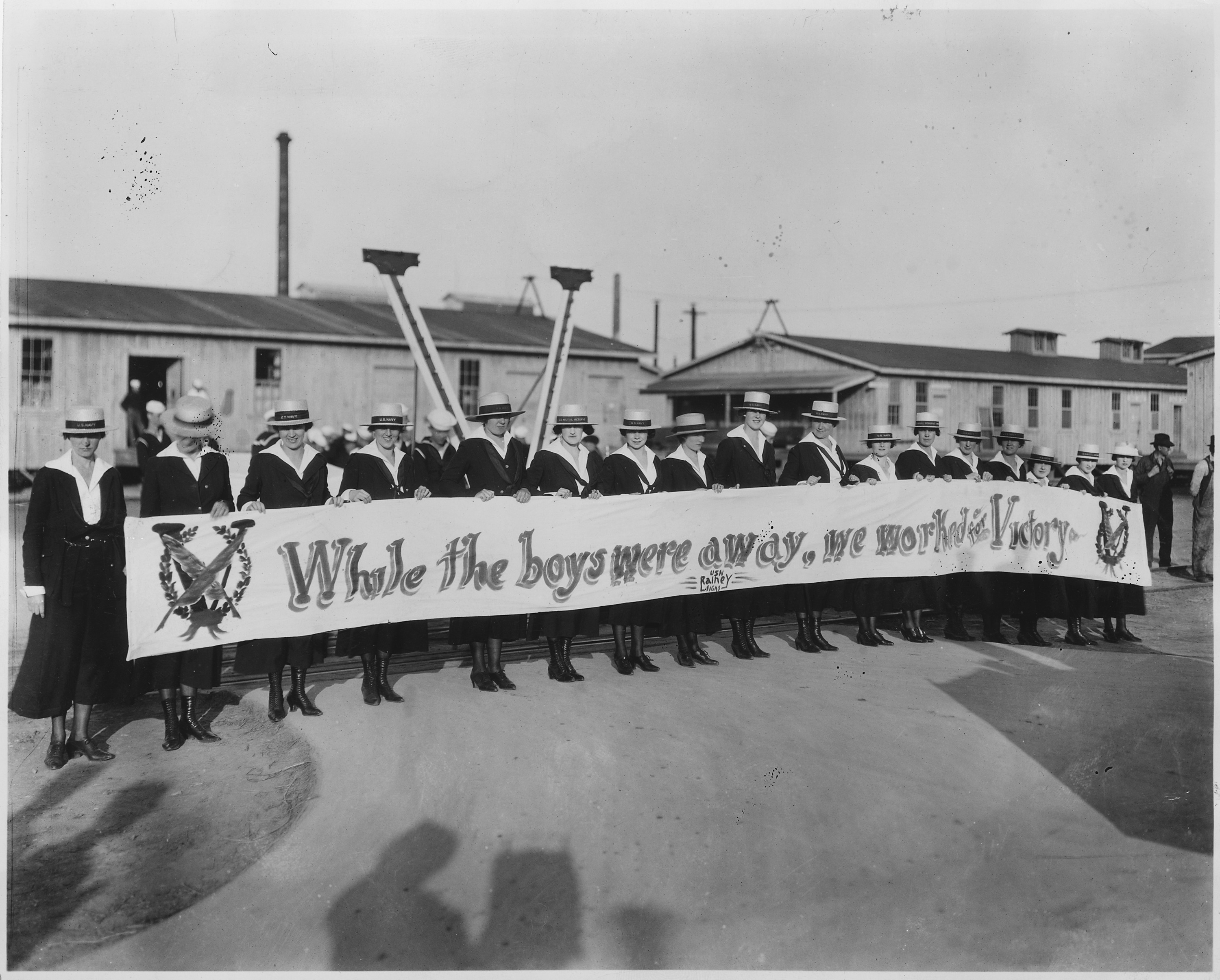
Supply Department Yeomanettes posed in front of their barracks

=== Childhood ===
Ann Frasier Norton was born in Boston, Massachusetts on April 10, 1893, to Charles Warren Frasier and Catherine Walsh Frasier. in 1902, when Catherine was nine, her mother died. Directly following this, her father was injured while working for the Boston Fire Department as a steam engine driver. Charles' injury and the death of Catherine prompted the family to move to New Hampshire.

=== Education ===
After moving to New Hampshire, Ann Frasier Norton was enrolled in the Pinkerton Academy in Derry, New Hampshire. Ann excelled in schooling and graduated in 1911, and chose to continue her education further at Bryant & Stratton Business College.

== Military service ==
Following graduation from Bryant and Stratton Business College, Ann married fellow Pinkerton Academy graduate Ewin Asa Norton. Edwin enlisted in the United States Army following the outbreak of World War one. Edwin departed for Field Artillery Officer Candidate school in Kentucky, and Ann traveled to Portsmouth, New Hampshire on 10 August 1918 where she enlisted in the Naval Coastal Defense Reserve, A component of the U.S. Navy. Following the entrance of the United States into the first World War, the U.S. Navy found itself lacking in manpower, and therefore created the position of Yeoman (F), allowing females to serve with the navy as nurses, messengers, radio operators, and other clerical positions. Ann was assigned the position of stenographer and secretary in the Commandant's office in Portsmouth.

== Death ==
Within a year of her enlistment with the Naval Coastal Defense Reserve, Ann contracted influenza, and died a day after falling ill on October 10, 1918. Ann had been admitted to the Naval Shipyard Hospital, and her body was escorted from the hospital to Woodlawn Cemetery, where she was buried. Ann was escorted by an all female group who acted as pallbearers and buried her with military honors. This makes Ann Frasier Norton the first woman to die while on active duty service with the U.S. military, and the first woman to officially be buried with military honors.
