= Edward E. Willard =

American politician

Edward Elsworth Willard
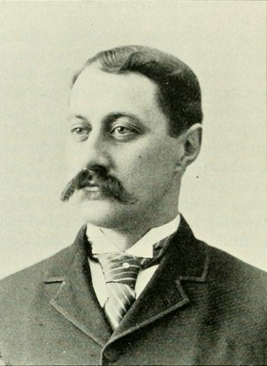

24th, 27th, & 29th Mayor of Chelsea, Massachusetts
- In office 1902–1907
- Preceded by: James Gould
- Succeeded by: John E. Beck
- In office 1913–1914
- Preceded by: James H. Malone
- Succeeded by: James H. Malone
- In office 1917–1918
- Preceded by: James H. Malone
- Succeeded by: Melvin B. Breath

Personal details
- Born: September 25, 1862 Lancaster, Massachusetts, U.S.
- Died: January 11, 1929 (aged 66) Phoenix, Arizona, U.S.
- Party: Republican
- Spouse: Lissis Doan Nickerson

Edward Elsworth Willard (September 25, 1862 – January 11, 1929) was an American politician who served as Mayor of Chelsea, Massachusetts.

== Early life ==
Willard was born in Lancaster, Massachusetts, on September 25, 1862, to Edman and Elizabeth E. Willard.

== Family life ==
Willard married Lissis Doan Nickerson of Chatham, Massachusetts, in that town in December 1895.

== See also ==
- 1920 Massachusetts legislature
- 1921–1922 Massachusetts legislature

== Notes ==
Political offices
Preceded by James Gould	24th Mayor of Chelsea, Massachusetts; 1902–1907	Succeeded by John E. Beck
Preceded by James H. Malone	27th Mayor of Chelsea, Massachusetts; 1913–1914	Succeeded by James H. Malone
Preceded by James H. Malone	29th Mayor of Chelsea, Massachusetts; 1917–1918	Succeeded by Melvin B. Breath
