= Alfred C. Converse =

American politician and businessman

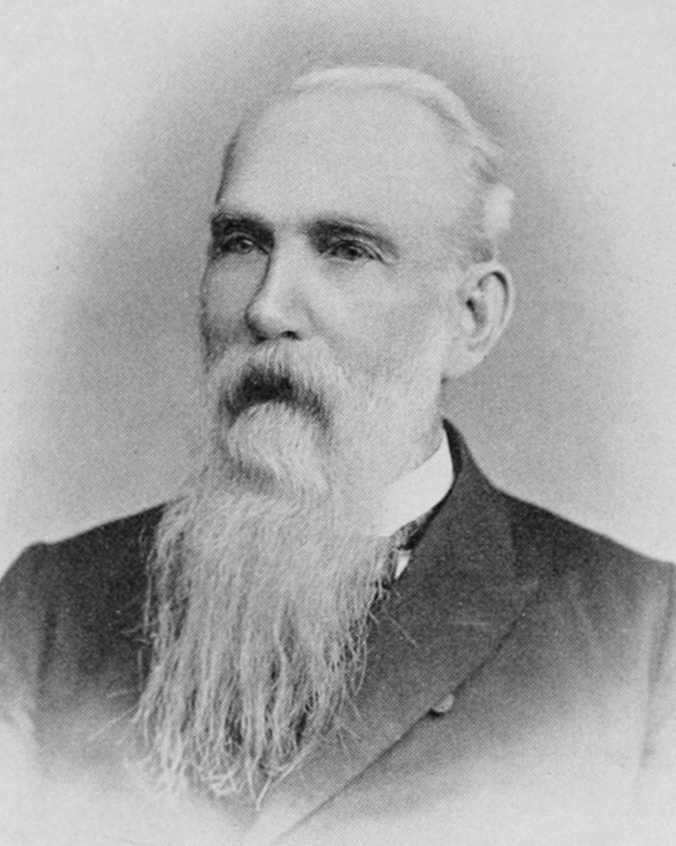

18th Mayor of Chelsea, Massachusetts
- In office 1892–1893
- Preceded by: Albert D. Bosson
- Succeeded by: George H. Carter

Personal details
- Born: Alfred Collins Converse; March 17, 1827 Rindge, New Hampshire
- Died: April 26, 1915 (aged 88) East Rindge, New Hampshire
- Party: Republican

Alfred Collins Converse (March 17, 1827 – April 26, 1915) was a Massachusetts businessman and politician who served as the eighteenth Mayor of Chelsea, Massachusetts.

== Biography ==
Alfred C. Converse was born in Rindge, New Hampshire on March 17, 1827.

He served as mayor of Chelsea, Massachusetts from 1892 to 1893.

He died in East Rindge, New Hampshire on April 26, 1915.

Political offices
Preceded by Albert D. Bosson	18th Mayor of Chelsea, Massachusetts; 1892–1893	Succeeded by George H. Carter
