= Joseph A. Melley =

American politician

Joseph Aloysius Melley
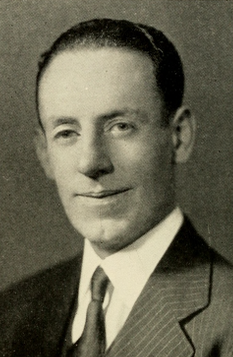
- Portrait of Joseph Aloysius Melley member of the Massachusetts House of Representatives 1939

39th Mayor of Chelsea, Massachusetts
- In office 1950–1951
- Preceded by: Tom Keating
- Succeeded by: Andrew P. Quigley

Member Massachusetts Senate 1st Suffolk District
- In office 1947–1950
- Preceded by: William R. Conley
- Succeeded by: Andrew P. Quigley

Member Massachusetts House of Representatives 23rd Suffolk District
- In office 1937–1940
- Preceded by: William H. Melley
- Succeeded by: Joseph Margolis

Personal details
- Born: March 1, 1902 Chelsea, Massachusetts
- Died: October 28, 1983 (aged 81) Chelsea, Massachusetts
- Party: Democratic
- Education: Boston College High School, Boston College, A.B., 1928; Boston University School of Law, 1928
- Profession: Attorney

Joseph Aloysius Melley (March 1, 1902 – October 28, 1983) was a Massachusetts attorney and politician who served as the thirty ninth Mayor of Chelsea, Massachusetts, USA, and in both houses of the Massachusetts legislature.

== See also ==
- Massachusetts legislature: 1937–1938, 1939, 1947–1948, 1949–1950

Political offices
Preceded by Tom Keating	39th Mayor of Chelsea, Massachusetts; 1950–1951	Succeeded by Andrew P. Quigley
Preceded by William R. Conley	Member of the Massachusetts Senate; 1st Suffolk District; 1947–1950	Succeeded by Andrew P. Quigley
