= Chelsea Public Schools =

School district in Massachusetts, U.S.

Location
- Chelsea, Massachusetts United States
- Coordinates: 42.3937°N 71.0333°W

District information
- Grades: PreK–12
- Superintendent: Almudena G. Abeyta
- Asst. superintendent(s): Tamara Blake-Canty, Michelle Martinello
- Budget: $103,895,124 total $14,334 per pupil (2016)
- NCES District ID: 2503540

Other information
- Website: www.chelseaschools.com

Chelsea Public Schools is a school district headquartered in Chelsea, Massachusetts in Greater Boston.

== Demographics ==
At the start of the 2013–2014 school year the district had 5,500 students. Due to a wave of immigrant children entering the district, the enrollment count increased to 6,200 by the end of the year. Dr. Mary Bourque, the superintendent, characterized the increase as "dramatic" and explained that "It’s a big strain in terms of being able to address the needs without knowing ahead of time that those will be the needs." Of the new students, 75 arrived from Arizona and Texas and 285 directly arrived from outside the United States.

== Schools ==
=== High school ===
- Chelsea High School
- Chelsea Opportunity Academy
- Chelsea Virtual Learning Academy

=== Middle school ===
- Browne Middle School
- Morris H. Siegal Clark Avenue Middle School
- Eugene Wright Science and Technology Academy

=== Elementary schools ===
- William A. Berkowitz Elementary School
- Edgar Hooks Elementary School
- George F. Kelly Elementary School
- Frank M. Sokolowski Elementary School
- Early Learning Center
