= Chelsea High School (Massachusetts) =

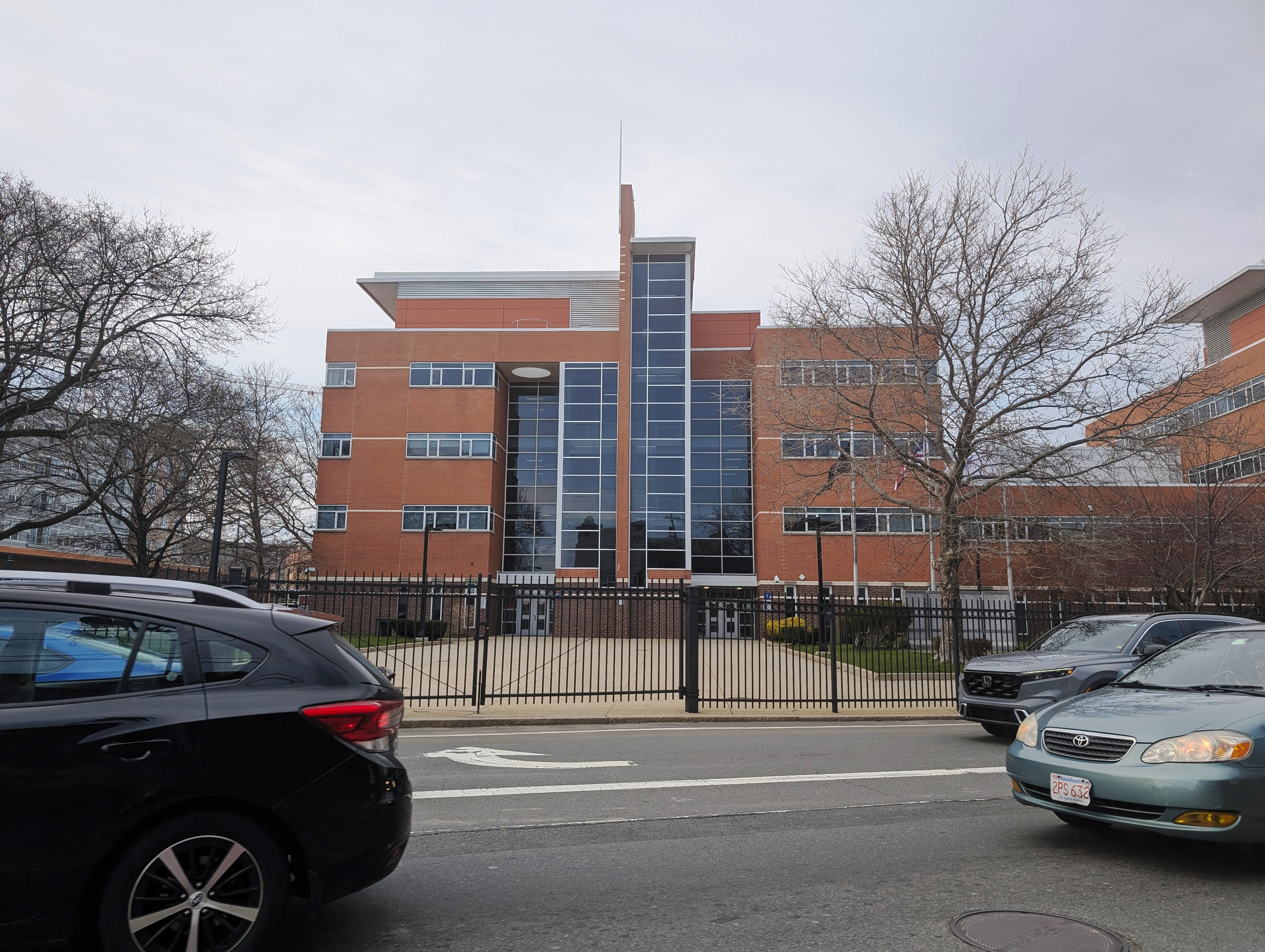
- Western wing of the high school

Location
- 299 Everett Avenue; Chelsea, Massachusetts 02150; United States; 42.4005°N 71.0403°W

Information
- School type: Public
- Established: 1845
- School district: Chelsea Public Schools
- Principal: Alan Beausoleil
- Teaching staff: 116.10 (FTE)
- Grades: 9–12
- Enrollment: 1,680 (2023-2024)
- Student to teacher ratio: 14.47
- Color
- Athletics conference: Greater Boston League
- Mascot: Red Devil
- Website: Chelsea High School

The Chelsea High School is located in Chelsea, Massachusetts, United States and is the only public high school in Chelsea. It is a part of Chelsea Public Schools. Established in 1845, Chelsea High moved into its current school building in 1996. Chelsea High School is located at 299 Everett Avenue, Chelsea, Massachusetts 02150.

Clubs provided are Drama Club, GSA (Gay Straight Alliance), Yearbook Club, Art Club, Rotary Club, Reach program, Chelsea Green Thumbs, Book club, among others. Athletics provided are football, basketball, softball, baseball, soccer, volleyball, track, cross country, and cheerleading.

School colors are Red, Black, and White. The school's mascot is the Red Devil, named in honor of the city's history of devastating fires.

== History ==
The first school opened on June 1, 1845, at Broadway and the corner of Malden (Everett Avenue) Street located in what was called Haskell's Hall. This location was used only temporarily until an actual building dedicated specifically for schooling was built in 1850. Although the building's sole purpose was that of a school it wasn't exclusive used as a high school. Four of the eight rooms were dedicated to the primary school. When enrollment increased a new school was built in 1872 located on Bellingham street. The new building came equipped with a modern laboratory for conducting physics and chemistry experiments. This school would later be destroyed in the 1908 Chelsea fire and its land would be donated to the Park Department and turned into a playground, known as Bossom Park. In 1904, four years prior to the fire of 1908, a new building was built on Crescent Avenue. The Crescent Avenue School was renovated in 1926 and a new addition was added to which extended from Clark Avenue to Tudor Street which bookended Crescent Avenue. During the times of their new renovated building Chelsea witnessed basketball success winning MIT Tournaments which is now considered State Championships. They won in the years of 1930, 1934, 1935, 1938. The school remained unchanged for 44 years until a fire in 1970 destroyed the auditorium. The school closed in 1996 as the high school was moved to a new building on Everett Avenue. The former school was closed for two years while determinations were made for the disposition before being renovated and reopened as a middle school educating 5th and 6th grade students and renamed as the Clark Avenue School.

In 1996 as part of a citywide school building plan a new school located on Everett was opened. Features included a large library, a 400-seat auditorium, modern science classrooms, and dedicated computer classrooms. In 2002, growing enrollment and crowded hallways forced a renovation adding a second gymnasium, a third wing, and the construction of new corridors between the three wings.

== Acknowledgments ==
Chelsea High School was acknowledged with the AP Small District of the Year Award in 2013 from College Board for their expansion in AP Courses while still improving their AP Scores.

== Notable alumni ==
- Warren Alpert (1920–2007), entrepreneur and philanthropist.
- Raymond W. Bliss (1888–1965), U.S. Army major general
- William Bryden (1880–1972), U.S. Army major general
- Vannevar Bush (1890–1974), director of the former U.S. Office of Scientific Research and Development
- Chick Corea (1941–2021), jazz musician
- Anna Christy Fall (1855–1930), American lawyer
