= 1931–1932 Massachusetts legislature =

147th Massachusetts General Court
←	146th	148th	→

Overview
- Legislative body: General Court

Senate
- Members: 40

House
- Members: 240

The 147th Massachusetts General Court, consisting of the Massachusetts Senate and the Massachusetts House of Representatives, met in 1931 and 1932.

== Senators ==
Portrait	Name	Date of birth	District
	Chester Willard Allen		
	Gaspar G. Bacon	March 7, 1886	6th Suffolk
	Malcolm Lawrie Bell	November 30, 1890	
	Albert C. Bray		
	Conde Brodbine	April 4, 1897	
	John P. Buckley	June 12, 1889	
	William S. Conroy	October 2, 1877	
	Joseph R. Cotton	November 16, 1890	
	Elbert M. Crockett	August 14, 1871	
	J. Bradford Davis	September 26, 1889	
	Joseph Finnegan		
	Erland F. Fish	December 7, 1883	
	Angier Goodwin	January 30, 1881	
	Cornelius F. Haley	July 15, 1875	
	Arthur W. Hollis	April 29, 1877	
	Newland H. Holmes	August 30, 1891	
	Frank Hurley	March 9, 1900	
	Thomas H. Johnston	March 5, 1872	
	Frederick E. Judd		
	Roger Keith		
	John D. Mackay	April 7, 1872	
	Joseph William Monahan		
	James G. Moran	May 2, 1870	
	George G. Moyse	December 21, 1878	
	Christian Nelson		
	George H. Nelson		
	Donald W. Nicholson	August 11, 1888	
	Edward H. Nutting	July 6, 1869	
	Henry Parkman Jr.	April 26, 1894	
	Theodore Robinson Plunkett	May 10, 1882	
	James Conlan Scanlan	December 18, 1896	
	William F. Shanahan		
	Charles Abbot Stevens		
	James J. Twohig	September 26, 1886	
	Max Ulin		
	Michael James Ward	September 19, 1899	
	Charles C. Warren		
	James E. Warren		
	Lawrence Theodore Woolfenden		
	Samuel H. Wragg	June 9, 1882	

== Representatives ==
Portrait	Name	Date of birth	District
	Henry Achin Jr.	June 30, 1883	14th Middlesex
	Augustine Airola		
	Charles W. Ames	March 10, 1860	
	George P. Anderson	February 19, 1873	
	Josiah Babcock Jr.	May 21, 1880	
	William Brooks Baker	January 10, 1879	
	William H. Barker	December 20, 1892	
	Philip Barnet	December 2, 1892	
	Mary Livermore Barrows	June 30, 1877	
	Albert L. Bartlett	June 1, 1851	
	Thomas R. Bateman	October 11, 1878	
	James D. Bentley	February 6, 1884	
	Alfred M. Bessette	March 25, 1876	
	Albert F. Bigelow	October 4, 1880	10th Norfolk
	Leo Birmingham	April 14, 1893	
	Frederick H. Bowser Jr.		
	Emma E. Brigham	June 10, 1872	
	George Francis Brooks	August 23, 1856	
	Harry Dunlap Brown		
	William Albert Brown	February 5, 1888	
	Charles Bruce		
	Albert W. Bullock	April 18, 1872	
	John K. Burgess	1863	
	Arthur I. Burgess	October 13, 1894	
	Albert H. Burnham		
	Marion Cowan Burrows	May 7, 1865	
	Fred L. Butler		
	Horace T. Cahill	December 12, 1894	
	Jerome Joseph Cahill		
	Thomas Francis Carroll		
	William Casey	November 20, 1884	
	Abraham B. Casson		
	Charles Thomas Cavanagh	June 12, 1893	
	Edward Michael Cawley		
	Chester W. Chase	August 27, 1885	
	Charles Daniel Chevalier		
	John Patrick Clancy		
	Francis Peter Clark	August 22, 1896	
	James W. Clark		
	Frank Clarkson	June 21, 1877	
	Daniel J. Coakley	November 18, 1880	
	Harold E. Cole		
	John T. Comerford	June 8, 1887	
	John J. Concannon		
	John Patrick Connolly	June 28, 1894	9th Suffolk
	William Patrick Corbett		
	Timothy J. Costello		
	Frank Bernard Coughlin	January 11, 1891	
	Richard D. Crockwell	October 23, 1886	
	Timothy James Cronin		
	Arthur Payne Crosby	August 1, 1879	
	Nelson B. Crosby	June 20, 1871	
	John J. Crowley	September 20, 1900	
	Francis Daniel Dailey		
	Daniel P. Day		
	Harry E. Day		
	Ernest J. Dean	April 5, 1883	
	John S. Derham		
	Louis N. M. DesChenes	April 7, 1872	
	Paul A. Dever	January 15, 1903	
	Burt Dewar	December 29, 1884	
	William Charles Dolan		
	Joseph H. Downey	December 6, 1890	
	Anthony R. Doyle	August 8, 1895	
	William Henry Doyle		
	Harold R. Duffie		
	Norman Le Roy Duncan		
	Eugene Patrick Durgin	December 12, 1884	
	Sven August Erickson	December 9, 1875	
	Archibald M. Estabrook		
	Henry A. Estabrook	April 22, 1850	
	Bruno M. Findeisen		
	Bernard Finkelstein	July 4, 1887	
	Peter J. Fitzgerald	September 13, 1899	
	John Ford	January 17, 1871	
	Winfred F. Forward		
	John P. Gaffney		
	Owen Ambrose Gallagher	May 24, 1902	
	Arthur F. Ganley		
	Tony Garofano	May 28, 1885	
	George A. Gilman	August 16, 1880	
	Eugene H. Giroux	January 20, 1903	
	J. Henry Goguen	March 8, 1899	
	Arthur Goulart		
	Lewis S. Gray		
	Joseph B. Grossman	July 15, 1892	
	James E. Hagan	January 25, 1902	
	John Halliwell	February 21, 1864	
	Ralph N. Hamilton	November 16, 1898	
	Arthur Alexander Hansen		
	Louis E. Hathaway	June 28, 1863	
	Jeremiah Joseph Healy	July 2, 1872	
	James W. Hennigan Sr.	1890	
	Christian Herter	March 28, 1895	
	William P. Hickey	November 17, 1871	
	John P. Higgins		
	William Anthony Higgins	July 23, 1897	
	Charles Sumner Holden		
	John Holmes	November 27, 1882	
	Herbert P. Houghton		
	William T. Hudson		
	John E. Hurley	November 2, 1906	
	Alfred Wesley Ingalls		
	John Joseph Irwin		
	Felix Irzyk		
	Victor Francis Jewett		
	Richard E. Johnston	March 22, 1873	
	Arthur Westgate Jones	January 11, 1873	
	John Alfred Jones		
	William A. Jones	March 27, 1885	
	Michael H. Jordan	February 7, 1863	
	Francis Kearney		
	William H. Keating		
	Charles A. Kelley	March 24, 1862	
	Edward J. Kelley	December 25, 1897	
	Francis Joseph Kelley	March 21, 1890	
	Thomas S. Kennedy		
	John V. Kimball	July 17, 1875	
	William E. Kirkpatrick	November 12, 1901	
	John Quincy Knowles	May 21, 1895	
	Wilfrid J. Lamoureux	December 13, 1869	
	Thomas J. Lane	July 6, 1898	
	Elmer E. Lane		
	Robert L. Lee		
	Robert Vincent Lee		
	Arnold Leonard		
	Marcus J. Levins		
	Joseph W. Leyden		
	Lester Blaine Libbey		
	Joseph A. Logan		
	Clarence S. Luitwieler		
	John P. Lyons	June 24, 1879	
	Harold Wayne Macauley		
	Frank E. MacLean		
	John Whitman MacLeod		
	William F. Madden	January 4, 1897	
	John V. Mahoney	July 20, 1889	
	Thomas F. Malloy		
	Stephen Andrew Manning		
	Felix A. Marcella		
	Philip M. Markley	March 28, 1897	
	Paul G. Martel		
	Dennis F. McCarthy		
	William Henry McCarthy		
	Elmer L. McCulloch		
	Timothy J. McDonough		
	Frank Joseph McFarland		
	Fred Joseph McGuinness		
	Owen D. McLellan		
	George McLeod		
	George C. McMenimen		
	Anthony A. McNulty		
	James Philip Meehan	June 25, 1893	
	William H. Melley	May 18, 1903	
	Harry Carrol Mohr		
	Patrick J. Moore	December 22, 1863	
	Daniel F. Moriarty		
	John Francis Murphy		
	Patrick Francis Nestor		
	Frank Daniel O'Brien	April 25, 1905	
	Michael T. O'Brien	December 3, 1868	
	Daniel J. O'Connor Jr.		
	Daniel W. O'Connor	March 12, 1877	
	James H. O'Dea		
	Joseph N. O'Kane	May 26, 1873	
	John Thomas O'Neill	August 22, 1900	
	Ralph Emerson Otis	January 16, 1890	
	Herman Pehrsson		
	Francis H. Perry	June 24, 1855	
	Tycho Mouritz Petersen	August 29, 1892	
	Louis Pfeiffer		
	Herbert Wilson Porter		
	Albert L. Potter		
	C. F. Nelson Pratt	February 4, 1891	
	William Patrick Prendergast		
	Francis E. Rafter	November 14, 1892	
	John J. Reardon		
	Josiah B. Reed		
	Joseph N. Roach	March 22, 1883	
	Victor E. Rolander	March 8, 1871	
	Joseph D. Rolfe	May 17, 1893	
	Elmer Gould Royce		
	Samuel Rushton		
	Leverett Saltonstall	September 1, 1892	
	Edward Julius Sandberg	October 21, 1866	
	John Sauter		
	Roland D. Sawyer	January 8, 1874	
	Frank O. Scott		
	William J. Sessions	December 18, 1859	
	Herbert Parker Philip Shaughnessy		
	Charles H. Shaylor		
	Howard Samuel Shepard	September 18, 1865	
	Philip Sherman		
	Leslie W. Sims		
	Harry D. Sisson	January 9, 1863	
	Charles Henry Slowey		
	B. Farnham Smith		
	Dexter Avery Snow	January 3, 1890	
	Norman Leon Snow		
	Julius H. Soble	March 1, 1906	
	Ernest H. Sparrell		
	Arthur T. Squires		
	Philip Huntley Stacy		
	Richard H. Stacy	August 18, 1864	
	Lemuel W. Standish		
	Edward William Staves	May 9, 1887	
	Alexander Francis Sullivan		
	Lewis R. Sullivan Jr.	March 9, 1900	
	Clyde Henry Swan		
	Martin Swanson	July 20, 1872	
	Frank A. Teele	August 25, 1866	
	Joseph E. Theberge	April 27, 1903	
	William Franklin Thomas Jr.		
	William R. Thomas	September 24, 1871	
	Jabez P. Thompson		
	Rupert C. Thompson		
	George Henry Tinker		
	Joseph Walton Tuttle Jr.	August 20, 1894	
	George M. Underwood		
	Herbert W. Urquhart	October 19, 1883	
	Eliot Wadsworth	1876	
	Ira C. Ward	March 7, 1862	
	Andrew C. Warner		
	Kendrick Harlow Washburn	July 29, 1893	
	Harold B. Webber		
	Louis A. Webster		
	Patrick J. Welsh	October 8, 1893	
	John J. Whalen	June 5, 1876	
	Ralph Wheelright		
	Frank Lewis Whipple		
	Joseph C. White	1899	
	Ernest Albert White		
	Sydney M. Williams		
	John Chester Wilson	August 14, 1889	
	Carl A. Woekel		
	Charles Frederick Young		
	Arthur Lincoln Youngman		
	Michael Zack		

== See also ==
- 1932 Massachusetts gubernatorial election
- 72nd United States Congress
- List of Massachusetts General Courts
