= 1933–1934 Massachusetts legislature =

148th Massachusetts General Court
←	147th	149th	→

Overview
- Legislative body: General Court

Senate
- Members: 40

House
- Members: 240

The 148th Massachusetts General Court, consisting of the Massachusetts Senate and the Massachusetts House of Representatives, met in 1933 and 1934.

== Senators ==
Portrait	Name	Date of birth	District
	Albert C. Bray		
	Edward C. Carroll	December 15, 1893	4th Suffolk
	Russell D. Chase		
	William S. Conroy	October 2, 1877	
	Joseph R. Cotton	November 16, 1890	
	Frank D. Crowley		
	J. Bradford Davis	September 26, 1889	
	Edgar C. Erickson	July 18, 1896	
	Joseph Finnegan		
	Erland F. Fish	December 7, 1883	
	Owen Ambrose Gallagher	May 24, 1902	
	Angier Goodwin	January 30, 1881	
	Cornelius F. Haley	July 15, 1875	
	Arthur W. Hollis	April 29, 1877	
	J. Frank Hughes		
	Frank Hurley	March 9, 1900	
	Thomas H. Johnston	March 5, 1872	
	George William Knowlton Jr.		
	Joseph A. Langone Jr.	September 8, 1896	
	John D. Mackay	April 7, 1872	
	William F. Madden	January 4, 1897	
	Charles Gardner Miles	December 2, 1879	
	Joseph William Monahan		
	James G. Moran	May 2, 1870	
	George G. Moyse	December 21, 1878	
	Donald W. Nicholson	August 11, 1888	
	Edward H. Nutting	July 6, 1869	
	Henry Parkman Jr.	April 26, 1894	
	Theodore Robinson Plunkett	May 10, 1882	
	Harry Bancroft Putnam	September 7, 1878	
	James Conlan Scanlan	December 18, 1896	
	William F. Shanahan		
	Charles Abbot Stevens		
	John S. Sullivan	December 18, 1875	
	Charles C. Warren		
	James E. Warren		
	Joseph C. White	1899	
	Lawrence Theodore Woolfenden		
	Samuel H. Wragg	June 9, 1882	

== Representatives ==
Portrait	Name	Date of birth	District
	Henry Achin Jr.	June 30, 1883	14th Middlesex
	Augustine Airola		
	William A. Akeroyd	October 24, 1883	
	Charles W. Ames	March 10, 1860	
	James Earl Arnold		
	John Francis Aspell	July 8, 1906	
	Josiah Babcock Jr.	May 21, 1880	
	Edward P. Bacigalupo	October 19, 1897	
	William Brooks Baker	January 10, 1879	
	William A. Baldwin	January 18, 1874	
	Philip Barnet	December 2, 1892	
	Mary Livermore Barrows	June 30, 1877	
	Thomas Edmund Barry	May 14, 1899	
	Albert L. Bartlett	June 1, 1851	
	Wilfred P. Bazinet		
	Malcolm Lawrie Bell	November 30, 1890	
	James D. Bently		
	Alfred M. Bessette	March 25, 1876	
	Albert F. Bigelow	October 4, 1880	10th Norfolk
	Leo Birmingham	April 14, 1893	
	Albert Lionel Bourgeois	June 7, 1899	
	Philip Griggs Bowker	April 17, 1899	
	Fred Emerson Briggs	March 14, 1875	
	Emma E. Brigham	June 10, 1872	
	Warren Kingsbury Brimblecom	June 25, 1899	
	Harry Dunlap Brown		
	William Albert Brown	February 5, 1888	
	Albert W. Bullock	April 18, 1872	
	Arthur I. Burgess	October 13, 1894	
	Horace T. Cahill	December 12, 1894	
	Charles J. Campbell	September 28, 1877	
	Zacheus H. Cande		
	Leo Edward Joseph Carney	November 16, 1899	
	Thomas Francis Carroll		
	Charles Thomas Cavanagh	June 12, 1893	
	Edward Michael Cawley		
	Tony A. Centracchio	May 25, 1906	
	Chester W. Chase	August 27, 1885	
	Charles Daniel Chevalier		
	Ralph Vester Clampit	March 28, 1896	
	Francis Peter Clark	August 22, 1896	
	James W. Clark		
	Frank Clarkson	June 21, 1877	
	Joseph Francis Cleary	September 4, 1901	
	Maynard Clemons	December 11, 1866	
	Francis David Coady	January 20, 1884	
	Andrew J. Coakley	November 6, 1906	
	Samuel H. Cohen		
	Harold E. Cole		
	John T. Comerford	June 8, 1887	
	Richard Comerford	October 13, 1905	
	John J. Concannon		
	Charles H. Cooke	May 13, 1878	
	Frank Bernard Coughlin	January 11, 1891	
	John Joseph Craven	August 29, 1907	
	Nelson B. Crosby	June 20, 1871	
	John J. Crowley	September 20, 1900	
	Laurence Curtis	September 3, 1893	
	George H. Dale	November 25, 1870	
	Ernest J. Dean	April 5, 1883	
	Hiram Nichols Dearborn	December 21, 1867	
	Thomas A. Delmore	December 21, 1894	
	George Demeter	March 13, 1896	
	John S. Derham		
	Louis N. M. DesChenes	April 7, 1872	
	Paul A. Dever	January 15, 1903	
	Burt Dewar	December 29, 1884	
	Thomas Patrick Dillon	February 19, 1901	
	George Lincoln Dodd	May 3, 1868	
	William Charles Dolan		
	Fred Belding Dole	January 23, 1895	
	John E. Donahue		
	James P. Donnelly	February 26, 1890	
	Cornelius P. Donovan	March 15, 1895	
	Thomas Dorgan	August 15, 1892	
	Joseph H. Downey	December 6, 1890	
	Anthony R. Doyle	August 8, 1895	
	William Henry Doyle		
	George F. Driscoll		
	Norman Le Roy Duncan		
	Samuel Eisenstadt		
	Sven August Erickson	December 9, 1875	
	Henry A. Estabrook	April 22, 1850	
	John Patrick Flavin		
	Frank L. Floyd	October 17, 1893	
	Winfred F. Forward		
	Owen Gallagher	November 12, 1884	
	Tony Garofano	May 28, 1885	
	Eugene H. Giroux	January 20, 1903	
	J. Henry Goguen	March 8, 1899	
	Hollis M. Gott	May 25, 1885	
	William Patrick Grant	November 5, 1904	
	James A. Gunn	June 7, 1883	
	James E. Hagan	January 25, 1902	
	John Halliwell	February 21, 1864	
	Ralph N. Hamilton	November 16, 1898	
	William Arthur Hannaford	October 14, 1892	
	Arthur Alexander Hansen		
	Joseph J. Harnisch	December 28, 1883	
	Clayton Locke Havey	July 17, 1897	
	Lawrence Alanson Haworth	May 23, 1871	
	Martin Hays	October 14, 1876	
	Charles W. Hedges	March 27, 1901	
	James W. Hennigan Sr.	1890	
	Christian Herter	March 28, 1895	
	William P. Hickey	November 17, 1871	
	John Patrick Higgins	February 19, 1893	
	William Anthony Higgins	July 23, 1897	
	Daniel J. Honan	January 19, 1884	
	John E. Hurley	November 2, 1906	
	Fred A. Hutchinson	April 5, 1881	
	Alfred Wesley Ingalls		
	Charles John Innes	June 1, 1901	
	John Joseph Irwin		
	Felix Irzyk		
	Victor Francis Jewett		
	Adolph Johnson	July 20, 1885	
	Archibald L. Jones	June 26, 1900	
	John Alfred Jones		
	William A. Jones	March 27, 1885	
	Michael H. Jordan	February 7, 1863	
	Charles A. Kelley	March 24, 1862	
	Edward J. Kelley	December 25, 1897	
	Francis Joseph Kelley	March 21, 1890	
	James Edward Kendall	September 4, 1870	
	George F. Killgoar		
	James J. Kilroy	September 26, 1902	
	John V. Kimball	July 17, 1875	
	Orvis F. Kinney	May 23, 1880	
	William E. Kirkpatrick	November 12, 1901	
	John Quincy Knowles	May 21, 1895	
	Leroy Litchfield Knowlton		
	Wilfrid J. Lamoureux	December 13, 1869	
	Thomas J. Lane	July 6, 1898	
	Joseph Lawrence Larson		
	John Whitin Lasell		
	Robert L. Lee		
	Robert Vincent Lee		
	Marcus J. Levins		
	Joseph W. Leyden		
	Henry Cabot Lodge Jr.	July 5, 1902	
	Joseph A. Logan		
	Terrance Joseph Lomax Jr.	August 29, 1907	
	Clarence S. Luitwieler		
	John P. Lyons	June 24, 1879	
	Frank E. MacLean		
	John V. Mahoney	July 20, 1889	
	Hyman Manevitch		
	Stephen Andrew Manning		
	Philip M. Markley	March 28, 1897	
	James M. McCracken	July 30, 1877	
	Elmer L. McCulloch		
	Paul John McDonald		
	Timothy J. McDonough		
	Frank Joseph McFarland		
	Lawrence P. McHugh		
	Owen D. McLellan		
	Anthony A. McNulty		
	James Philip Meehan	June 25, 1893	
	William H. Melley	May 18, 1903	
	Joseph A. Milano	April 8, 1883	
	Archie Foster Minnis		
	Daniel F. Moriarty		
	Albert Edward Morris	April 4, 1903	
	George Samuel Mycock		
	David G. Nagle	October 22, 1901	
	Elmer C. Nelson	June 1, 1900	
	Frank Daniel O'Brien	April 25, 1905	
	Michael T. O'Brien	December 3, 1868	
	Daniel J. O'Connell		
	Raymond Francis O'Connell	August 11, 1901	
	Daniel W. O'Connor	March 12, 1877	
	James H. O'Dea		
	Joseph N. O'Kane	May 26, 1873	
	John Thomas O'Neill	August 22, 1900	
	Ralph Emerson Otis	January 16, 1890	
	Bartol Parker		
	Royal Bartlett Patriquin	January 7, 1895	
	Herman Pehrsson		
	Tycho Mouritz Petersen	August 29, 1892	
	Frederick Everett Pierce	May 5, 1862	
	C. F. Nelson Pratt	February 4, 1891	
	William Eben Ramsdell	May 4, 1895	
	George Edmund Rice	February 22, 1899	
	Joseph N. Roach	March 22, 1883	
	Victor E. Rolander	March 8, 1871	
	Joseph D. Rolfe	May 17, 1893	
	Cyrus Cole Rounseville Jr.		
	Francis Edward Ryan	October 6, 1895	
	Harold G. Sackett		
	Leverett Saltonstall	September 1, 1892	
	Frank Joseph Sargent	March 11, 1900	
	Roland D. Sawyer	January 8, 1874	
	Louis James Scanlon	March 25, 1899	
	Frank O. Scott		
	William J. Sessions	December 18, 1859	
	Frank Chester Sheridan	July 21, 1893	
	Philip Sherman		
	Harry D. Sisson	January 9, 1863	
	Donald Nelson Sleeper		
	E. Hayes Small	December 23, 1876	
	B. Farnham Smith		
	Dexter Avery Snow	January 3, 1890	
	Julius H. Soble	March 1, 1906	
	J. Francis Southgate	May 4, 1883	
	Ernest H. Sparrell		
	Arthur T. Squires		
	Philip Huntley Stacy		
	Richard H. Stacy	August 18, 1864	
	Edward William Staves	May 9, 1887	
	George A. Stetson		
	Alexander Francis Sullivan		
	Arthur Vincent Sullivan		
	James J. Sullivan		
	Lewis R. Sullivan Jr.	March 9, 1900	
	William T. Swain	December 2, 1878	
	Martin Swanson	July 20, 1872	
	Mollie Ashby Sweetser	April 17, 1882	
	Chester Randall Swenson		
	Joseph E. Theberge	April 27, 1903	
	James Francis Tobin	May 8, 1903	
	Horace F. Tuttle		
	Joseph Walton Tuttle Jr.	August 20, 1894	
	Herbert W. Urquhart	October 19, 1883	
	Ira C. Ward	March 7, 1862	
	Michael James Ward	September 19, 1899	
	Dwight S. Waring		
	Waterman Goulding Warren		
	Kendrick Harlow Washburn	July 29, 1893	
	Harold B. Webber		
	Patrick J. Welsh	October 8, 1893	
	John J. Whalen	June 5, 1876	
	Frank Lewis Whipple		
	Joseph L. Whiton		
	William Whitwham		
	Sydney M. Williams		
	John Chester Wilson	August 14, 1889	
	Carl A. Woekel		
	Martin E. Young	January 5, 1896	
	Arthur Lincoln Youngman		

== See also ==
- 1934 Massachusetts gubernatorial election
- 73rd United States Congress
- List of Massachusetts General Courts
