= 1935–1936 Massachusetts legislature =

149th Massachusetts General Court
←	148th	150th	→

Overview
- Legislative body: General Court
- Election: November 6, 1934

Senate
- Members: 40
- President: James G. Moran (1st Bristol district)
- Party control: Republican (21–19)

House
- Members: 240
- Speaker: Leverett Saltonstall (5th Middlesex)
- Party control: Republican

Sessions
- 1st: January 2, 1935 – August 15, 1935
- 2nd: January 1, 1936 – July 2, 1936

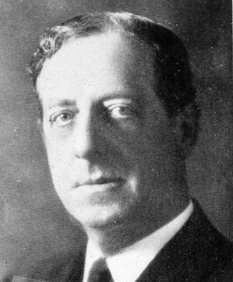
James Moran, Senate president.

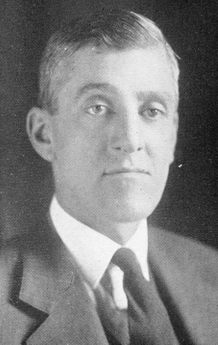
Leverett Saltonstall, House speaker.

Leaders of the Massachusetts General Court, 1935.

The 149th Massachusetts General Court, consisting of the Massachusetts Senate and the Massachusetts House of Representatives, met in 1935 and 1936 during the governorship of James Michael Curley. James G. Moran served as president of the Senate and Leverett Saltonstall served as speaker of the House.

== Senators ==
Portrait	Name	Date of birth	District	Hometown	Party	Since
	Thomas M. Burke	May 30, 1898	8th Suffolk	Dorchester	Democratic	1935
	Edward C. Carroll	December 15, 1893	4th Suffolk	South Boston	Democratic	1933
	Patrick Eugene Casey	September 24, 1886	4th Worcester	Milford	Democratic	1935
	Charles Thomas Cavanagh	June 12, 1893	2nd Middlesex	Cambridge	Democratic	1934
	Albert Cole	December 28, 1904	1st Essex	Lynn	Republican	1935
	William S. Conroy	October 2, 1877	2nd Bristol	Fall River	Democratic	1929
	Walter L. Considine	August 7, 1900	3rd Bristol	New Bedford	Democratic	1935
	Joseph R. Cotton	November 16, 1890	7th Middlesex	Lexington	Republican	1927
	Charles Thomas Daly	March 12, 1882	6th Middlesex	Medford	Democratic	1935
	William Aiken Davenport	October 23, 1869	Franklin and Hampshire	Greenfield	Republican	1935
	Joseph P. Donahoe	September 18, 1891	7th Suffolk	Dorchester	Democratic	1935
	John F. Donovan	April 26, 1897	1st Suffolk	Chelsea	Democratic	1935
	Edgar C. Erickson	July 18, 1896	2nd Worcester	Worcester	Republican	1933
	Erland F. Fish	December 7, 1883	Norfolk and Suffolk	Brookline	Republican	1925
	Angier Goodwin	January 30, 1881	4th Middlesex	Melrose	Republican	1929
	Cornelius F. Haley	July 15, 1875	3rd Essex	Rowley	Republican	1927
	Arthur W. Hollis	April 29, 1877	1st Middlesex	Newton	Republican	1929
	Newland H. Holmes	August 30, 1891	Norfolk and Plymouth	Weymouth	Republican	1931
	Frank Hurley	March 9, 1900	2nd Hampden	Holyoke	Democratic	1929
	Thomas H. Johnston	March 5, 1872	Worcester and Hampden	Clinton	Republican	1931
	Joseph A. Langone Jr.	September 8, 1896	2nd Suffolk	Boston	Democratic	1933
	John D. Mackay	April 7, 1872	Norfolk	Quincy	Republican	1930
	William F. Madden	January 4, 1897	5th Suffolk	Jamaica Plain	Democratic	1933
	Charles Albert Proctor McAree	November 3, 1908	4th Essex	Haverhill	Democratic	1935
	William F. McCarthy	November 9, 1902	8th Middlesex	Lowell	Democratic	1935
	Francis M. McKeown		1st Hampden	Springfield	Democratic	1935
	James Philip Meehan	June 25, 1893	5th Essex	Lawrence	Democratic	1934
	Charles Gardner Miles	December 2, 1879	Plymouth	Brockton	Republican	1933
	James G. Moran	May 2, 1870	1st Bristol	Mansfield	Republican	1923
	George G. Moyse	December 21, 1878	5th Middlesex	Waltham	Republican	1925
	Donald W. Nicholson	August 11, 1888	Cape and Plymouth	Wareham	Republican	1927
	Edward H. Nutting	July 6, 1869	3rd Worcester	Leominster	Republican	1931
	Henry Parkman Jr.	April 26, 1894	3rd Suffolk	Boston	Republican	1929
	Albert Pierce	February 29, 1876	2nd Essex	Salem	Republican	1935
	Theodore Robinson Plunkett	May 10, 1882	Berkshire	Adams	Republican	1931
	Harry Bancroft Putnam	September 7, 1878	Berkshire, Hampshire, and Hampden	Westfield	Republican	1933
	James Conlan Scanlan	December 18, 1896	3rd Middlesex	Somerville	Democratic	1931
	John S. Sullivan	December 18, 1875	1st Worcester	Worcester	Democratic	1933
	Joseph C. White	1899	6th Suffolk	Jamaica Plain	Democratic	1933
	Samuel H. Wragg	June 9, 1882	Norfolk and Middlesex	Needham	Republican	1925

== Representatives ==
Portrait	Name	Date of birth	District
	Henry Achin Jr.	June 30, 1883	14th Middlesex
	Augustine Airola		
	William A. Akeroyd	October 24, 1883	
	George T. Ashe	February 6, 1905	
	John Francis Aspell	July 8, 1906	
	Frank David Babcock	August 16, 1877	
	Josiah Babcock Jr.	May 21, 1880	
	Edward P. Bacigalupo	October 19, 1897	
	William Brooks Baker	January 10, 1879	
	William A. Baldwin	January 18, 1874	
	Philip Barnet	December 2, 1892	
	Mary Livermore Barrows	June 30, 1877	
	Thomas Edmund Barry	May 14, 1899	
	Stanley Spilsted Bates	August 10, 1890	
	Walter Ray Baylies	April 28, 1902	
	Malcolm Lawrie Bell	November 30, 1890	
	Albert Bergeron	June 23, 1886	
	Alfred M. Bessette	March 25, 1876	
	Rodolphe G. Bessette	September 14, 1911	
	Albert F. Bigelow	October 4, 1880	10th Norfolk
	Leo Birmingham	April 14, 1893	
	Fred Arthur Blake	January 13, 1895	
	Edward Boland	October 1, 1911	
	Rufus Hallowell Bond	December 24, 1896	
	Albert Lionel Bourgeois	June 7, 1899	
	Philip Griggs Bowker	April 17, 1899	
	Albert Ovila Boyer	May 27, 1908	
	Edward T. Brady	October 23, 1908	
	Fred Emerson Briggs	March 14, 1875	
	Emma E. Brigham	June 10, 1872	
	Warren Kingsbury Brimblecom	June 25, 1899	
	William Albert Brown	February 5, 1888	
	Arthur I. Burgess	October 13, 1894	
	Horace T. Cahill	December 12, 1894	
	Zacheus H. Cande		
	Leo Edward Joseph Carney	November 16, 1899	
	Michael Joseph Carroll	June 21, 1891	
	Bernard P. Casey	July 29, 1894	
	Tony A. Centracchio	May 25, 1906	
	Chester W. Chase	August 27, 1885	
	Ralph Vester Clampit	March 28, 1896	
	Frank Clarkson	June 21, 1877	
	Ignatius B. Cleary	May 19, 1892	
	Joseph Francis Cleary	September 4, 1901	
	Francis David Coady	January 20, 1884	
	Andrew J. Coakley	November 6, 1906	
	John W. Coddaire Jr.		
	Edward A. Coffey	October 17, 1892	
	Samuel H. Cohen		
	John T. Comerford	June 8, 1887	
	Richard Comerford	October 13, 1905	
	Edward J. Connelly	October 10, 1876	
	Charles H. Cooke	May 13, 1878	
	Timothy Joseph Cooney	September 30, 1909	
	Frank Bernard Coughlin	January 11, 1891	
	Francis X. Coyne	March 15, 1892	
	Nelson B. Crosby	June 20, 1871	
	Ralph Raymond Currier	October 28, 1892	
	Laurence Curtis	September 3, 1893	
	Ernest J. Dean	April 5, 1883	
	Hiram Nichols Dearborn	December 21, 1867	
	Thomas A. Delmore	December 21, 1894	
	George Demeter	March 13, 1896	
	Burt Dewar	December 29, 1884	
	Thomas Patrick Dillon	February 19, 1901	
	Fred Belding Dole	January 23, 1895	
	John Joseph Donahue	March 14, 1906	
	Martin William Donahue	January 4, 1893	
	James P. Donnelly	February 26, 1890	
	Cornelius P. Donovan	March 15, 1895	
	Joseph William Dooley	October 25, 1904	
	Thomas Dorgan	August 15, 1892	
	Joseph H. Downey	December 6, 1890	
	Anthony R. Doyle	August 8, 1895	
	George F. Driscoll		
	Clarence N. Durant	May 15, 1884	
	Sven August Erickson	December 9, 1875	
	Henry A. Estabrook	April 22, 1850	
	Gustave William Everberg	June 24, 1890	
	John J. Falvey	February 22, 1904	
	Bernard Finkelstein	July 4, 1887	
	Thomas A. Flaherty	December 21, 1898	
	Thomas J. Flannery	August 9, 1886	
	Frank L. Floyd	October 17, 1893	
	John J. Foley	January 25, 1888	
	Katherine A. Foley	May 10, 1889	
	Owen Gallagher	November 12, 1884	
	John J. Gilmartin	September 25, 1892	
	Eugene H. Giroux	January 20, 1903	
	John Leo Gleason	June 27, 1903	
	Hollis M. Gott	May 25, 1885	
	William Patrick Grant	November 5, 1904	
	James A. Gunn	June 7, 1883	
	John Halliwell	February 21, 1864	
	Ralph N. Hamilton	November 16, 1898	
	William Arthur Hannaford	October 14, 1892	
	Thomas J. Hannon	December 9, 1900	
	Joseph J. Harnisch	December 28, 1883	
	George Paterson Hassett	May 25, 1888	
	William Alexander Hastings	February 22, 1868	
	James Dolan Hathaway	November 17, 1907	
	Clayton Locke Havey	July 17, 1897	
	Martin Hays	October 14, 1876	
	Jeremiah Joseph Healy	July 2, 1872	
	Charles W. Hedges	March 27, 1901	
	James W. Hennigan Sr.	1890	
	Christian Herter	March 28, 1895	
	William Francis Higgins	June 16, 1899	
	Charles V. Hogan	April 12, 1897	
	Daniel J. Honan	January 19, 1884	
	Frank Hathaway Horton	July 15, 1874	
	Fred A. Hutchinson	April 5, 1881	
	Charles John Innes	June 1, 1901	
	Francis William Irwin	November 19, 1905	
	Adolph Johnson	July 20, 1885	
	Archibald L. Jones	June 26, 1900	
	Gerald Denison Jones	August 24, 1878	
	William A. Jones	March 27, 1885	
	Michael H. Jordan	February 7, 1863	
	Patrick Joseph Kearns	September 8, 1912	
	Charles A. Kelley	March 24, 1862	
	Edward J. Kelley	December 25, 1897	
	Francis Joseph Kelley	March 21, 1890	
	James Edward Kendall	September 4, 1870	
	James J. Kiley	July 5, 1911	
	George F. Killgoar		
	John V. Kimball	July 17, 1875	
	Orvis F. Kinney	May 23, 1880	
	William E. Kirkpatrick	November 12, 1901	
	John Quincy Knowles	May 21, 1895	
	George M. Kurzon		
	William Landergan	August 28, 1899	
	Leo P. Landry	July 10, 1897	
	Thomas J. Lane	July 6, 1898	
	John Whitin Lasell		
	Frank M. Leonardi	August 17, 1891	
	Henry Cabot Lodge Jr.	July 5, 1902	
	Terrance Joseph Lomax Jr.	August 29, 1907	
	Clarence S. Luitwieler		
	William Christopher Lunney	December 24, 1910	
	John P. Lyons	June 24, 1879	
	Donald Alexander MacDonald	February 21, 1893	
	Frank E. MacLean		
	Arthur Ulton Mahan	June 18, 1900	
	James Francis Mahoney	September 24, 1890	
	John Francis Manning	January 4, 1906	
	Philip M. Markley	March 28, 1897	
	Joseph Patrick McCooey		
	James M. McCracken	July 30, 1877	
	Elmer L. McCulloch		
	Frederick T. McDermott	November 20, 1906	
	Paul John McDonald		
	Timothy J. McDonough		
	James Maxwell McElroy		
	Lawrence P. McHugh		
	Henry Parker McLaren		
	Owen D. McLellan		
	Roger Alton McNamara		
	Anthony A. McNulty		
	William H. Melley	May 18, 1903	
	Joseph A. Milano	April 8, 1883	
	Charles H. Morrill	October 6, 1874	
	Albert Edward Morris	April 4, 1903	
	Frank J. Morrison	September 2, 1902	
	Joseph L. Murphy	January 25, 1907	
	John E. Murphy	February 13, 1900	
	John Joseph Murphy	August 28, 1892	
	Timothy Joseph Murphy	September 23, 1909	
	John A. Murray	May 6, 1906	
	David G. Nagle	October 22, 1901	
	Elmer C. Nelson	June 1, 1900	
	Frank Daniel O'Brien	April 25, 1905	
	Michael T. O'Brien	December 3, 1868	
	Raymond Francis O'Connell	August 11, 1901	
	Joseph N. O'Kane	May 26, 1873	
	Edwin Lawrence Olander	October 31, 1891	
	Charles William Olson	August 24, 1889	
	Ralph Emerson Otis	January 16, 1890	
	Katherine Vose Parker	November 16, 1888	
	Arthur E. Paul	January 6, 1902	
	Richard Farnsworth Paul	January 17, 1888	
	Tycho Mouritz Petersen	August 29, 1892	
	George Wesley Pettengill	September 17, 1868	
	Frederick Everett Pierce	May 5, 1862	
	George Francis Pierce	August 13, 1895	
	William Eben Ramsdell	May 4, 1895	
	Frederick Henry Reinstein	April 14, 1899	
	George Edmund Rice	February 22, 1899	
	Joseph N. Roach	March 22, 1883	
	Victor E. Rolander	March 8, 1871	
	Joseph D. Rolfe	May 17, 1893	
	David A. Rose	1905	
	Albert Rubin	January 15, 1872	
	Francis Edward Ryan	October 6, 1895	
	Leverett Saltonstall	September 1, 1892	
	Frank Joseph Sargent	March 11, 1900	
	Charles H. Savage	January 7, 1893	
	Roland D. Sawyer	January 8, 1874	
	Louis James Scanlon	March 25, 1899	
	Martin Robert Schofield	September 28, 1906	
	Mason Sears	December 29, 1899	
	William J. Sessions	December 18, 1859	
	John Richard Shaughnessy	February 6, 1901	
	Charles H. Shea	December 14, 1891	
	Frank Chester Sheridan	July 21, 1893	
	Philip Sherman		
	Edward Sirois	December 18, 1898	
	Harry D. Sisson	January 9, 1863	
	E. Hayes Small	December 23, 1876	
	Frank William Smith	January 26, 1895	
	J. Francis Southgate	May 4, 1883	
	Ernest H. Sparrell		
	Richard H. Stacy	August 18, 1864	
	Edward William Staves	May 9, 1887	
	George Sawyer Stone	February 3, 1866	
	Patrick Gilbert Sullivan	November 18, 1904	
	William T. Swain	December 2, 1878	
	Martin Swanson	July 20, 1872	
	Mollie Ashby Sweetser	April 17, 1882	
	Edmond Talbot Jr.	June 1, 1898	
	George Grosvenor Tarbell	1886	
	Frederick H. Tarr Jr.	March 25, 1903	
	Joseph E. Theberge	April 27, 1903	
	James Francis Tobin	May 8, 1903	
	Joseph Walton Tuttle Jr.	August 20, 1894	
	Christopher J. Tyrrell	June 21, 1895	
	Herbert W. Urquhart	October 19, 1883	
	John H. Valentine	July 21, 1896	
	Magorisk Lawrence Walls	August 5, 1898	
	Ira C. Ward	March 7, 1862	
	Michael James Ward	September 19, 1899	
	Kendrick Harlow Washburn	July 29, 1893	
	Patrick J. Welsh	October 8, 1893	
	John B. Wenzler	June 11, 1881	
	John J. Whalen	June 5, 1876	
	John Philip White		
	John Chester Wilson	August 14, 1889	
	Carl A. Woekel		
	Martin E. Young	January 5, 1896	
	Abraham I. Zimon		

== See also ==
- 1936 Massachusetts gubernatorial election
- 74th United States Congress
- List of Massachusetts General Courts
