= 1925–1926 Massachusetts legislature =

144th Massachusetts General Court
←	143rd	145th	→

Overview
- Legislative body: General Court

Senate
- Members: 40

House
- Members: 240

The 144th Massachusetts General Court, consisting of the Massachusetts Senate and the Massachusetts House of Representatives, met in 1925 and 1926.

== Senators ==
portrait	name	date of birth	district
	Gaspar G. Bacon	March 7, 1886	8th Suffolk
	Alfred M. Bessette	March 25, 1876	
	Alvin E. Bliss		
	John B. Cashman		
	George Dudley Chamberlain		
	Edward J. Cox		
	Hugh Cregg	1888	
	Warren Chapman Daggett	May 10, 1868	
	J. Bradford Davis	September 26, 1889	
	Eben S. Draper Jr.	August 30, 1893	
	Erland F. Fish	December 7, 1883	
	William J. Francis		
	Charles Benjamin Frothingham	November 11, 1858	
	Harvey A. Gallup	October 16, 1869	
	Harry Peabody Gifford		
	John W. Haigis	July 31, 1881	
	Charles H. Hartshorn		
	William Ignatius Hennessey		
	Charles P. Howard		
	Clarence P. Kidder		
	William J. Look	June 20, 1867	
	Daniel Aloysius Martin		
	John W. McCormack	December 21, 1891	
	Walter E. McLane		
	James G. Moran	May 2, 1870	
	George G. Moyse	December 21, 1878	
	James J. Mulvey		
	Christian Nelson		
	Walter Perham		
	Frank B. Phinney		
	Abbott B. Rice		
	Walter Shuebruk		
	Dexter Avery Snow	January 3, 1890	
	John A. Stoddart	May 10, 1869	
	John E. Thayer Jr.		
	George M. Webber		
	Wellington Wells	April 18, 1868	
	Samuel H. Wragg	June 9, 1882	

== Representatives ==
portrait	name	date of birth	district
	Charles E. Abbott	February 22, 1856	9th Essex
	Henry Achin Jr.	June 30, 1883	
	Elijah Adlow	August 15, 1896	
	George B. Ager	December 30, 1860	
	William A. Akeroyd	October 24, 1883	
	Harry Benjamin Albro	January 21, 1887	
	Walter Dickey Allen	March 15, 1896	
	Charles W. Ames	March 10, 1860	
	George P. Anderson	February 19, 1873	
	Charles H. Annis	January 12, 1869	
	Charles H. Ashley	February 13, 1860	
	Thomas N. Ashton	April 27, 1884	
	Josiah Babcock Jr.	May 21, 1880	
	Benjamin Barnes	October 19, 1880	
	Edmund M. Bartlett	March 15, 1886	
	Charles Rodman Bassett	October 2, 1865	
	Thomas R. Bateman	October 11, 1878	
	Robert L. Baylies	July 26, 1864	
	John E. Beck	May 10, 1869	
	William J. Bell	December 7, 1884	
	William A. Bennett	March 7, 1887	
	James D. Bentley	February 6, 1884	
	Thomas H. Bilodeau	February 3, 1885	
	Leo Birmingham	April 14, 1893	
	Arthur Franklin Blanchard	January 27, 1883	
	Harold M. Bradbury	July 9, 1886	
	Frank A. Brainerd	May 6, 1870	
	George Francis Brooks	August 23, 1856	
	Robert S. Brown	November 20, 1869	
	John P. Buckley	June 12, 1889	
	Albert W. Bullock	April 18, 1872	
	John K. Burgess	1863	
	Garrett H. Byrne	November 29, 1897	
	Julius F. Carman	August 7, 1861	
	George H. Carpenter	November 14, 1869	
	Charles L. Carr	December 25, 1876	
	Lemuel D. Carter	October 25, 1872	
	Bernard P. Casey	July 29, 1894	
	James Bernard Casey	June 19, 1897	
	Francis E. Cassidy	February 14, 1888	
	Clifford F. Chamberlain	February 17, 1879	
	Francis Peter Clark	August 22, 1896	
	Ezra W. Clark	October 12, 1842	
	Maynard Clemons	December 11, 1866	
	Daniel J. Coakley	November 18, 1880	
	Arthur Willard Colburn	December 1, 1877	
	Emerson J. Coldwell	April 29, 1888	
	William J. Conlon	March 14, 1868	
	William S. Conroy	October 2, 1877	
	Francis X. Coyne	March 15, 1892	
	Richard D. Crockwell	October 23, 1886	
	Arthur Payne Crosby	August 1, 1879	
	Thomas Charles Crowther	April 28, 1892	
	Daniel Joseph Curley	December 23, 1875	
	Bert S. Currier	August 2, 1864	
	George H. Dale	November 25, 1870	
	Elbridge Gerry Davis	August 20, 1877	
	John P. Day	January 25, 1878	
	Ernest J. Dean	April 5, 1883	
	Hiram Nichols Dearborn	December 21, 1867	
	Louis N. M. DesChenes	April 7, 1872	
	Burt Dewar	December 29, 1884	
	Robert Dinsmore	December 22, 1897	
	Oscar U. Dionne	March 3, 1897	
	George Lincoln Dodd	May 3, 1868	
	Sylvia Donaldson	July 12, 1849	
	John F. Donovan	April 26, 1897	
	Thomas F. Donovan	September 26, 1890	
	Timothy Francis Donovan	August 21, 1889	
	Walter Franklyn Douglas	August 22, 1869	
	Robert W. Dow	July 15, 1868	
	Andrew P. Doyle	August 15, 1869	
	William L. DuBois	July 31, 1892	
	Eugene Patrick Durgin	December 12, 1884	
	Henry T. G. Dyson	October 4, 1858	
	Frank W. Eaton	February 22, 1871	
	Henry A. Estabrook	April 22, 1850	
	Gustave William Everberg	June 24, 1890	
	John T. Farrell	January 30, 1893	
	Allan S. Farwell	July 2, 1867	
	Walter H. Faunce		
	Bernard Finkelstein	July 4, 1887	
	William Arthur Fish	July 4, 1885	
	Peter J. Fitzgerald	September 13, 1899	
	John I. Fitzgerald	July 18, 1882	
	Maurice E. Foley	February 8, 1893	
	Charles R. Foote	July 9, 1865	
	Tony Garofano	May 28, 1885	
	Hugh H. Garrity	May 4, 1883	
	Richard J. Garvey	July 19, 1892	
	Herbert J. George	May 16, 1868	
	George A. Gilman	August 16, 1880	
	Bernard Ginsburg	August 1, 1898	
	Angier Goodwin	January 30, 1881	
	Patrick E. Granfield	March 17, 1894	
	Walter Bernard Grant	February 11, 1885	
	Louis L. Green		
	William Jeremiah Greenler		
	Thomas J. Griffin		
	Frederick David Griggs	November 2, 1890	4th Hampden district
	C. Wesley Hale	February 13, 1872	
	Albert Harrison Hall		
	Arthur Alexander Hansen		
	Harriet Russell Hart	February 1, 1878	
	Leslie T. Haskins		
	Benjamin A. Hastings		
	James William Hayes		
	Martin Hays	October 14, 1876	
	Jeremiah Joseph Healy	July 2, 1872	
	William H. Hearn		
	Thomas J. Hefferon		
	William P. Hickey	November 17, 1871	
	Matthew A. Higgins		
	Lyman A. Hodgdon		
	Charles Sumner Holden		
	Robert H. J. Holden		
	Arthur W. Hollis	April 29, 1877	
	Newland H. Holmes	August 30, 1891	
	Elisha Hooper		
	Michael F. Hourihan		
	Harold E. Howard		
	Edgar F. Howland		
	John C. Hull (politician)	November 1, 1870	
	James Melville Hunnewell		
	Joseph L. Hurley	April 20, 1898	
	Fred A. Hutchinson	April 5, 1881	
	Alfred Wesley Ingalls		
	Herbert Jackson		
	George Frederick James		
	Victor Francis Jewett		
	Thomas H. Johnston	March 5, 1872	
	John Alfred Jones		
	Arthur Westgate Jones	January 11, 1873	
	Michael H. Jordan	February 7, 1863	
	Frederick E. Judd		
	George Edward Keegan		
	Roland M. Keith	March 16, 1847	
	Francis Joseph Kelley	March 21, 1890	
	Charles A. Kelley	March 24, 1862	
	Edward J. Kelley	December 25, 1897	
	Thomas S. Kennedy		
	William E. Kirkpatrick	November 12, 1901	
	John Fenderson Kyes		
	Alfred Napoleon LaBrecque		
	William D. Lancaster		
	Joseph Lawrence Larson		
	Robert Sumner Leonard		
	Joseph W. Leyden		
	Arthur E. Littlefield		
	Clarence S. Luitwieler		
	James H. Lyons		
	William F. Madden	January 4, 1897	15th Suffolk
	George E. Malcolm		
	George E. Malcolm		
	Felix A. Marcella		
	Joseph Martin	February 18, 1867	
	Edward M. Matz		
	John J. McCarthy		
	Richard J. McCormick	August 11, 1888	
	Elmer L. McCulloch		
	Willard Spaulding McKay		
	Bennett V. McLaughlin		
	George C. McMenimen		
	Carroll Meins	October 22, 1892	
	John Mitchell	September 4, 1877	
	Daniel F. Moriarty		
	Thomas J. Morton	March 2, 1856	
	James Ashton Mulhall		
	Joseph J. Mulhern		
	Luke David Mullen		
	Patrick Francis Nestor		
	Donald W. Nicholson	August 11, 1888	
	Edward H. Nutting	July 6, 1869	
	John J. O'Brien	October 18, 1879	
	Daniel W. O'Connor	March 12, 1877	
	James H. O'Dea		
	Joseph N. O'Kane	May 26, 1873	
	Cornelius Jerome O'Neill		
	Olof F. Ohlson		
	Frank Wellman Osborne		
	Ralph Emerson Otis	January 16, 1890	
	Herman Pehrsson		
	George Penshorn		
	Chauncey Pepin		
	Francis H. Perry	June 24, 1855	
	Joseph Earl Perry	December 30, 1884	
	Lewis Hilton Peters		
	Charles Stuart Phelps		
	Chester Arthur Pike		
	George K. Pond		
	Leonard H. Porter		
	Edgar F. Power		
	Thomas Joseph Powers		
	William Patrick Prendergast		
	Everett R. Prout		
	Langdon Prouty		
	Francis E. Rafter	November 14, 1892	
	Harry C. Rice		
	George Louis Richards		
	Henry Francis Ripley		
	Joseph N. Roach	March 22, 1883	
	Leverett Saltonstall	September 1, 1892	
	Edward Julius Sandberg	October 21, 1866	
	Roland D. Sawyer	January 8, 1874	
	Walter E. Schuster		
	Frank O. Scott		
	Henry Lee Shattuck	October 12, 1879	
	Michael F. Shaw	September 12, 1865	
	Charles H. Shaylor		
	Charles Henry Slowey		
	Walter Herbert Snow		
	Ernest H. Sparrell		
	Elmer E. Spear	January 2, 1887	
	Lemuel W. Standish		
	J. Sidney Stone		
	Ralph Raymond Stratton		
	Patrick J. Sullivan		
	Albert Austin Sutherland		
	Charles Symonds		
	George Ira Tarr		
	Frank A. Teele	August 25, 1866	
	William Franklin Thomas Jr.		
	John Thomas	January 27, 1859	
	Elwin L. Thompson		
	James A. Torrey	September 27, 1868	
	James J. Twohig	September 26, 1886	
	George M. Underwood		
	Herbert W. Urquhart	October 19, 1883	
	Irving Everett Walker		
	Edward F. Wallace		
	Joseph M. Ward		
	James E. Warren		
	Frederick A. Warren		
	Slater Washburn		
	James T. Welch		
	William H. Wellen		
	Sargent Holbrook Wellman		
	Renton Whidden		
	Lawrence Theodore Woolfenden		
	Willard Otis Wylie		

== See also ==
- 1926 Massachusetts gubernatorial election
- 69th United States Congress
- List of Massachusetts General Courts
