= 1927–1928 Massachusetts legislature =

145th Massachusetts General Court
←	144th	146th	→

Overview
- Legislative body: General Court

Senate
- Members: 40

House
- Members: 240

The 145th Massachusetts General Court, consisting of the Massachusetts Senate and the Massachusetts House of Representatives, met in 1927 and 1928.

== Senators ==
Portrait	Name	Date of birth	District
	Charles H. Annis	January 12, 1869	
	Gaspar G. Bacon	March 7, 1886	6th Suffolk
	Alfred M. Bessette	March 25, 1876	
	Robert E. Bigney		
	Thomas H. Bilodeau	February 3, 1885	
	Alvin E. Bliss		
	John B. Cashman		
	George Dudley Chamberlain		
	Joseph R. Cotton	November 16, 1890	
	Edward J. Cox		
	Hugh Cregg	1888	
	Elbert M. Crockett	August 14, 1871	
	Warren Chapman Daggett	May 10, 1868	
	J. Bradford Davis	September 26, 1889	
	George B. Farrington		
	Erland F. Fish	December 7, 1883	
	Harvey A. Gallup	October 16, 1869	
	Cornelius F. Haley	July 15, 1875	
	Charles H. Hartshorn		
	William Ignatius Hennessey		
	Charles Ward Johnson	March 8, 1894	
	Frederick E. Judd		
	Clarence P. Kidder		
	Henry L. Kincaide		
	Daniel Aloysius Martin		
	Walter E. McLane		
	James G. Moran	May 2, 1870	
	George G. Moyse	December 21, 1878	
	James J. Mulvey		
	Donald W. Nicholson	August 11, 1888	
	Walter Perham		
	George K. Pond		
	Edward Simoneau	April 24, 1890	
	John E. Thayer Jr.		
	Charles C. Warren		
	George M. Webber		
	Wellington Wells	April 18, 1868	
	Samuel H. Wragg	June 9, 1882	

== Representatives ==
Portrait	Name	Date of birth	District
	Henry Achin Jr.	June 30, 1883	14th Middlesex
	George Irving Adams		
	George B. Ager	December 30, 1860	
	Augustine Airola		
	William A. Akeroyd	October 24, 1883	
	Harry Benjamin Albro	January 21, 1887	
	George L. L. Allen		
	Charles W. Ames	March 10, 1860	
	George P. Anderson	February 19, 1873	
	J. Willis Andrews		
	Thomas N. Ashton	April 27, 1884	
	Harrison H. Atwood		
	Clinton E. Austin		
	Edward Avery		
	Josiah Babcock Jr.	May 21, 1880	
	William A. Baldwin	January 18, 1874	
	William H. Barker	December 20, 1892	
	Elliott R. Barker		
	Benjamin Barnes	October 19, 1880	
	Edwin N. Bartlett		
	Thomas R. Bateman	October 11, 1878	
	John E. Beck	May 10, 1869	
	William A. Bennett	March 7, 1887	
	James D. Bentley	February 6, 1884	
	Albert F. Bigelow	October 4, 1880	10th Norfolk
	Leo Birmingham	April 14, 1893	
	Arthur Franklin Blanchard	January 27, 1883	
	Harold M. Bradbury	July 9, 1886	
	Frank A. Brainerd	May 6, 1870	
	George E. Briggs	May 3, 1873	
	Conde Brodbine	April 4, 1897	
	Martha N. Brookings	November 16, 1881	
	George Francis Brooks	August 23, 1856	
	John P. Buckley	June 12, 1889	
	Albert W. Bullock	April 18, 1872	
	John K. Burgess	1863	
	Garrett H. Byrne	November 29, 1897	
	Julius F. Carman	August 7, 1861	
	Thomas Harold Carr		
	William Casey	November 20, 1884	
	Abraham B. Casson		
	Jeremiah K. Chandler	September 30, 1863	
	Chester W. Chase	August 27, 1885	
	Francis Peter Clark	August 22, 1896	
	Ezra W. Clark	October 12, 1842	
	Maynard Clemons	December 11, 1866	
	Henry Cloutier		
	Daniel J. Coakley	November 18, 1880	
	Emerson J. Coldwell	April 29, 1888	
	D. Herbert Cook	June 2, 1851	
	Azarie Z. Coutu		
	Francis X. Coyne	March 15, 1892	
	Arthur Payne Crosby	August 1, 1879	
	Frank D. Crowley		
	Thomas Charles Crowther	April 28, 1892	
	William J. Davison		
	Ernest J. Dean	April 5, 1883	
	Hiram Nichols Dearborn	December 21, 1867	
	George A. Dennett		
	John S. Derham		
	Louis N. M. DesChenes	April 7, 1872	
	Burt Dewar	December 29, 1884	
	Oscar U. Dionne	March 3, 1897	
	Sylvia Donaldson	July 12, 1849	
	Robert W. Dow	July 15, 1868	
	Andrew P. Doyle	August 15, 1869	
	Charles R. Doyle		
	William L. DuBois	July 31, 1892	
	Harold R. Duffie		
	Horace E. Dunkle		
	Henry T. G. Dyson	October 4, 1858	
	Frank W. Eaton	February 22, 1871	
	Louis Ellenwood		
	Sven August Erickson	December 9, 1875	
	Henry A. Estabrook	April 22, 1850	
	Archibald M. Estabrook		
	Howard Fall		
	Joseph Finnegan		
	Peter J. Fitzgerald	September 13, 1899	
	Maurice E. Foley	February 8, 1893	
	Charles R. Foote	July 9, 1865	
	John Ford	January 17, 1871	
	Isidore H. Fox		
	John P. Gaffney		
	Owen Ambrose Gallagher	May 24, 1902	
	Arthur F. Ganley		
	Tony Garofano	May 28, 1885	
	Hugh H. Garrity	May 4, 1883	
	Félix Gatineau	November 12, 1857	
	Charles E. Gerrish		
	George A. Gilman	August 16, 1880	
	Angier Goodwin	January 30, 1881	
	Patrick E. Granfield	March 17, 1894	
	Louis L. Green		
	Frederick David Griggs	November 2, 1890	4th Hampden district
	Joseph B. Grossman	July 15, 1892	
	Edward J. Gurry		
	James E. Hagan	January 25, 1902	
	C. Wesley Hale	February 13, 1872	
	Albert Harrison Hall		
	Lemuel C. Hall		
	John Halliwell	February 21, 1864	
	Bernard F. Hanrahan	July 27, 1875	
	Arthur Alexander Hansen		
	Ernest W. Haskell		
	Louis E. Hathaway	June 28, 1863	
	Martin Hays	October 14, 1876	
	Jeremiah Joseph Healy	July 2, 1872	
	William H. Hearn		
	Thomas J. Hefferon		
	William P. Hickey	November 17, 1871	
	Francis J. Hickey		
	Lyman A. Hodgdon		
	Charles Sumner Holden		
	Robert H. J. Holden		
	Arthur W. Hollis	April 29, 1877	
	John Holmes	November 27, 1882	
	Charles H. Holmes		
	Newland H. Holmes	August 30, 1891	
	Horace W. Hosie	February 2, 1864	
	Joseph L. Hurley	April 20, 1898	
	Fred A. Hutchinson	April 5, 1881	
	John Joseph Irwin		
	George Frederick James		
	Victor Francis Jewett		
	G. Adolph Johnson	September 9, 1889	17th Worcester
	Thomas H. Johnston	March 5, 1872	
	Richard E. Johnston	March 22, 1873	
	John Alfred Jones		
	Arthur Westgate Jones	January 11, 1873	
	Michael H. Jordan	February 7, 1863	
	John Kendall Joy Jr.		
	Roland M. Keith	March 16, 1847	
	Charles A. Kelley	March 24, 1862	
	Thomas S. Kennedy		
	William E. Kirkpatrick	November 12, 1901	
	John Fenderson Kyes		
	Alfred Napoleon LaBrecque		
	Wilfrid J. Lamoureux	December 13, 1869	
	Thomas J. Lane	July 6, 1898	
	Joseph Lawrence Larson		
	Arnold Leonard		
	Robert Sumner Leonard		
	Joseph W. Leyden		
	Charles J. Little		
	Joseph A. Logan		
	Martin Lomasney	December 3, 1859	
	Clarence S. Luitwieler		
	Allan Barker MacGregor		
	James E. Mahler		
	Joseph Martin	February 18, 1867	
	William Henry McCarthy		
	Richard J. McCormick	August 11, 1888	
	Elmer L. McCulloch		
	Willard Spaulding McKay		
	Bennett V. McLaughlin		
	George C. McMenimen		
	Anthony A. McNulty		
	Carroll Meins	October 22, 1892	
	Wilbert T. Moore		
	Daniel F. Moriarty		
	Patrick E. Murray	August 22, 1869	
	Patrick Francis Nestor		
	Edward H. Nutting	July 6, 1869	
	Daniel W. O'Connor	March 12, 1877	
	Joseph N. O'Kane	May 26, 1873	
	John J. O’Leary		
	Bernard J. O’Neil		
	Edwin Lawrence Olander	October 31, 1891	
	Frank Wellman Osborne		
	Ralph Emerson Otis	January 16, 1890	
	Herman Pehrsson		
	George Penshorn		
	Francis H. Perry	June 24, 1855	
	Joseph Earl Perry	December 30, 1884	
	Lewis Hilton Peters		
	Chester Arthur Pike		
	Albert L. Potter		
	Edgar F. Power		
	Walter G. Powers		
	C. F. Nelson Pratt	February 4, 1891	
	Francis E. Rafter	November 14, 1892	
	Harry C. Rice		
	Henry Francis Ripley		
	Joseph N. Roach	March 22, 1883	
	Edward J. Robbins		
	Henry D. Rockwell		
	Leverett Saltonstall	September 1, 1892	
	Edward Julius Sandberg	October 21, 1866	
	John Sauter		
	Roland D. Sawyer	January 8, 1874	
	Frank O. Scott		
	John F. Scott		
	Richard D. Seamans		
	William J. Sessions	December 18, 1859	
	Henry Lee Shattuck	October 12, 1879	
	Charles H. Shaylor		
	William M. Silverman		
	Florence Slocomb	April 26, 1867	19th or 20th Worcester
	Walter Herbert Snow		
	Ernest H. Sparrell		
	Lemuel W. Standish		
	Frank K. Stearns		
	Ralph Stevens		
	J. Sidney Stone		
	Lewis R. Sullivan	1874	
	Charles Sumner Sullivan Jr.		
	Edward J. Sullivan		
	Charles Symonds		
	William Franklin Thomas Jr.		
	J. Valentine Thomas		
	Rupert C. Thompson		
	Maurice J. Tobin	May 22, 1901	
	James A. Torrey	September 27, 1868	
	James J. Twohig	September 26, 1886	
	Herbert W. Urquhart	October 19, 1883	
	Eliot Wadsworth	1876	
	Wilford Almon Walker		
	Irving Everett Walker		
	Frank W. Warfield		
	Andrew C. Warner		
	James E. Warren		
	Kendrick Harlow Washburn	July 29, 1893	
	Slater Washburn		
	Harold B. Webber		
	William H. Wellen		
	Patrick J. Welsh	October 8, 1893	
	Ralph Wheelright		
	Renton Whidden		
	Carl A. Woekel		
	Lawrence Theodore Woolfenden		
	Thomas J. Worrell	August 21, 1874	
	Willard Otis Wylie		

== See also ==
- 1928 Massachusetts gubernatorial election
- 70th United States Congress
- List of Massachusetts General Courts
