= 1929–1930 Massachusetts legislature =

146th Massachusetts General Court
←	145th	147th	→

Overview
- Legislative body: General Court
- Election: November 6, 1928

Senate
- Members: 40
- President: Gaspar G. Bacon (6th Suffolk)
- Party control: Republican

House
- Members: 240
- Speaker: Leverett Saltonstall (5th Middlesex)
- Party control: Republican

Sessions
- 1st: January 2, 1929 – May 29, 1930
- 2nd: October 20, 1930 – October 20, 1930

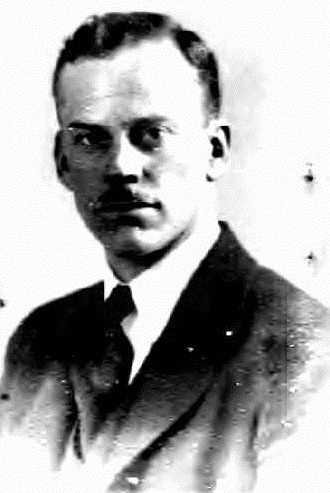
Gaspar Bacon, Senate president.

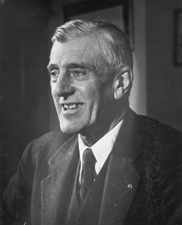
Leverett Saltonstall, House speaker.

Leaders of the Massachusetts General Court, 1929.

The 146th Massachusetts General Court, consisting of the Massachusetts Senate and the Massachusetts House of Representatives, met in 1929 and 1930 during the governorship of Frank G. Allen. Gaspar G. Bacon served as president of the Senate and Leverett Saltonstall served as speaker of the House.

== Senators ==
Portrait	Name	Date of birth	District
	Gaspar G. Bacon	March 7, 1886	6th Suffolk
	Robert E. Bigney		
	Conde Brodbine	April 4, 1897	
	John P. Buckley	June 12, 1889	
	John Francis Buckley	December 5, 1894	
	William S. Conroy	October 2, 1877	
	Joseph R. Cotton	November 16, 1890	
	Elbert M. Crockett	August 14, 1871	
	Warren Chapman Daggett	May 10, 1868	
	J. Bradford Davis	September 26, 1889	
	Cady R. Elder		
	Charles William Faulkner		
	Erland F. Fish	December 7, 1883	
	Angier Goodwin	January 30, 1881	
	C. Wesley Hale	February 13, 1872	
	Cornelius F. Haley	July 15, 1875	
	Arthur W. Hollis	April 29, 1877	
	Frank Hurley	March 9, 1900	
	Charles Ward Johnson	March 8, 1894	
	Frederick E. Judd		
	Roger Keith		
	Clarence P. Kidder		
	Henry L. Kincaide		
	James G. Moran	May 2, 1870	
	George G. Moyse	December 21, 1878	
	Joseph J. Mulhern		
	George H. Nelson		
	Donald W. Nicholson	August 11, 1888	
	Frank Wellman Osborne		
	Henry Parkman Jr.	April 26, 1894	
	Walter Perham		
	Henry Francis Ripley		
	Nathaniel P. Sowle	October 30, 1857	
	Warren E. Tarbell		
	James A. Torrey	September 27, 1868	
	Michael James Ward	September 19, 1899	
	Charles C. Warren		
	James E. Warren		
	Thomas J. Worrell	August 21, 1874	
	Samuel H. Wragg	June 9, 1882	

== Representatives ==
Portrait	Name	Date of birth	District
	Henry Achin Jr.	June 30, 1883	14th Middlesex
	Harry L. Adams		
	Augustine Airola		
	William A. Akeroyd	October 24, 1883	
	Charles W. Ames	March 10, 1860	
	George P. Anderson	February 19, 1873	
	Josiah Babcock Jr.	May 21, 1880	
	William Brooks Baker	January 10, 1879	
	William A. Baldwin	January 18, 1874	
	William H. Barker	December 20, 1892	
	Elliott R. Barker		
	Philip Barnet	December 2, 1892	
	Mary Livermore Barrows	June 30, 1877	
	Thomas R. Bateman	October 11, 1878	
	Wilfred P. Bazinet		
	Malcolm Lawrie Bell	November 30, 1890	
	William J. Bell	December 7, 1884	
	Albert F. Bigelow	October 4, 1880	10th Norfolk
	Leo Birmingham	April 14, 1893	
	Seth Howard Boardman		
	Joseph James Borgatti		
	Frank A. Brainerd	May 6, 1870	
	James Michael Brennan	October 30, 1902	
	Edgar Turner Brickett		
	George E. Briggs	May 3, 1873	
	Emma E. Brigham	June 10, 1872	
	Martha Brooks	November 16, 1881	
	George Francis Brooks	August 23, 1856	
	Harry Dunlap Brown		
	Albert W. Bullock	April 18, 1872	
	Arthur I. Burgess	October 13, 1894	
	John K. Burgess	January 1, 1863	
	Thomas S. Burgin		
	Marion Cowan Burrows	May 7, 1865	
	Fred L. Butler		
	Horace T. Cahill	December 12, 1894	
	Henry W. Caldwell		
	Thomas Harold Carr		
	Thomas Francis Carroll		
	William Casey	November 20, 1884	
	Abraham B. Casson		
	Charles Thomas Cavanagh	June 12, 1893	
	Edward Michael Cawley		
	Chester W. Chase	August 27, 1885	
	Charles Daniel Chevalier		
	Francis Peter Clark	August 22, 1896	
	James W. Clark		
	Maynard Clemons	December 11, 1866	
	Daniel J. Coakley	November 18, 1880	
	James S. Coffey	February 5, 1899	
	John Patrick Connolly	June 28, 1894	9th Suffolk
	William Patrick Corbett		
	Everett C. Crane		
	William C. Creed		
	Richard D. Crockwell	October 23, 1886	
	Timothy James Cronin		
	Arthur Payne Crosby	August 1, 1879	
	Frank D. Crowley		
	Thomas Charles Crowther	April 28, 1892	
	Francis Daniel Dailey		
	Charles Robert Damon		
	W. Taylor Day		
	Harry E. Day		
	Ernest J. Dean	April 5, 1883	
	Hiram Nichols Dearborn	December 21, 1867	
	John S. Derham		
	Louis N. M. DesChenes	April 7, 1872	
	Paul A. Dever	January 15, 1903	
	Burt Dewar	December 29, 1884	
	Sylvia Donaldson	July 12, 1849	
	Robert W. Dow	July 15, 1868	
	Anthony R. Doyle	August 8, 1895	
	Harold R. Duffie		
	Eugene Patrick Durgin	December 12, 1884	
	Felix J. Dussault		
	Louis Ellenwood		
	Sven August Erickson	December 9, 1875	
	Henry A. Estabrook	April 22, 1850	
	Archibald M. Estabrook		
	Howard Fall		
	Joseph Finnegan		
	John Ford	January 17, 1871	
	Isidore H. Fox		
	John P. Gaffney		
	Owen Ambrose Gallagher	May 24, 1902	
	Arthur F. Ganley		
	Tony Garofano	May 28, 1885	
	George A. Gilman	August 16, 1880	
	Bernard Ginsburg	August 1, 1898	
	Richard D. Gleason	September 22, 1896	
	Arthur Goulart		
	Emile J. Gravel		
	Lewis S. Gray		
	John Joseph Hackett		
	James E. Hagan	January 25, 1902	
	John Halliwell	February 21, 1864	
	Ralph N. Hamilton	November 16, 1898	
	Arthur Alexander Hansen		
	Martin Hays	October 14, 1876	
	Jeremiah Joseph Healy	July 2, 1872	
	William H. Hearn		
	William P. Hickey	November 17, 1871	
	Francis J. Hickey		
	John Patrick Higgins	February 19, 1893	
	Charles Sumner Holden		
	Charles H. Holmes		
	Newland H. Holmes	August 30, 1891	
	John Holmes	November 27, 1882	
	Horace W. Hosie	February 2, 1864	
	Fred A. Hutchinson	April 5, 1881	
	Alfred Wesley Ingalls		
	John Joseph Irwin		
	Victor Francis Jewett		
	Richard E. Johnston	March 22, 1873	
	William A. Jones	March 27, 1885	
	John Alfred Jones		
	Arthur Westgate Jones	January 11, 1873	
	Michael H. Jordan	February 7, 1863	
	John Kendall Joy Jr.		
	Francis Kearney		
	William H. Keating		
	Francis Joseph Kelley	March 21, 1890	
	Charles A. Kelley	March 24, 1862	
	Edward J. Kelley	December 25, 1897	
	Thomas S. Kennedy		
	George Thomas Keyes		
	John V. Kimball	July 17, 1875	
	Orvis F. Kinney	May 23, 1880	
	Orvis F. Kinney	May 23, 1880	
	William E. Kirkpatrick	November 12, 1901	
	Samuel Knowles		
	George William Knowlton Jr.		
	Millard B. LaCroix		
	Wilfrid J. Lamoureux	December 13, 1869	
	Thomas J. Lane	July 6, 1898	
	Joseph Lawrence Larson		
	Arnold Leonard		
	Joseph W. Leyden		
	Lester Blaine Libbey		
	Joseph A. Logan		
	Clarence S. Luitwieler		
	John P. Lyons	June 24, 1879	
	Allan Barker MacGregor		
	Frank E. MacLean		
	John Whitman MacLeod		
	John V. Mahoney	July 20, 1889	
	Felix A. Marcella		
	Paul G. Martel		
	Dennis F. McCarthy		
	William Henry McCarthy		
	Elmer L. McCulloch		
	Timothy J. McDonough		
	Frank Joseph McFarland		
	Willard Spaulding McKay		
	George McLeod		
	George C. McMenimen		
	William M. McMorrow		
	Anthony A. McNulty		
	James Philip Meehan	June 25, 1893	
	William A. Menzie		
	Daniel F. Moriarty		
	Luke David Mullen		
	Patrick Francis Nestor		
	Edward H. Nutting	July 6, 1869	
	Ignatius Jerome O'Connor		
	Daniel W. O'Connor	March 12, 1877	
	Joseph N. O'Kane	May 26, 1873	
	Edwin Lawrence Olander	October 31, 1891	
	Ralph Emerson Otis	January 16, 1890	
	Charles Louis Page		
	Herman Pehrsson		
	Joseph Earl Perry	December 30, 1884	
	Francis H. Perry	June 24, 1855	
	Tycho Mouritz Petersen	August 29, 1892	
	Thomas G. Portmore		
	Albert L. Potter		
	Edgar F. Power		
	Frank A. Powers		
	C. F. Nelson Pratt	February 4, 1891	
	Francis E. Rafter	November 14, 1892	
	John J. Reardon		
	Joseph N. Roach	March 22, 1883	
	Edward J. Robbins		
	Victor E. Rolander	March 8, 1871	
	Leverett Saltonstall	September 1, 1892	
	Edward Julius Sandberg	October 21, 1866	
	John Sauter		
	Roland D. Sawyer	January 8, 1874	
	Frank O. Scott		
	William J. Sessions	December 18, 1859	
	Henry Lee Shattuck	October 12, 1879	
	Charles H. Shaylor		
	Leslie W. Sims		
	Harry D. Sisson	January 9, 1863	
	Charles Henry Slowey		
	Thomas Smith Jr.		
	B. Farnham Smith		
	H. Merton Snow		
	Dexter Avery Snow	January 3, 1890	
	Norman Leon Snow		
	Ernest H. Sparrell		
	Elmer E. Spear	January 2, 1887	
	Arthur T. Squires		
	Richard H. Stacy	August 18, 1864	
	Philip Huntley Stacy		
	Lemuel W. Standish		
	Edward William Staves	May 9, 1887	
	Ralph Stevens		
	Joseph Fayette Stone	February 8, 1858	
	Charles Sumner Sullivan Jr.		
	Denis J. Sullivan	July 24, 1889	
	Timothy Daniel Sullivan		
	Lewis R. Sullivan Jr.	March 9, 1900	
	Clyde Henry Swan		
	Martin Swanson	July 20, 1872	
	Frank A. Teele	August 25, 1866	
	William Franklin Thomas Jr.		
	William R. Thomas	September 24, 1871	
	Rupert C. Thompson		
	Bayard Tuckerman Jr.	April 19, 1889	
	James J. Twohig		
	Eliot Wadsworth	January 1, 1876	
	Wilford Almon Walker		
	Ira C. Ward	March 7, 1862	
	Andrew C. Warner		
	Kendrick Harlow Washburn	July 29, 1893	
	Slater Washburn		
	Harold B. Webber		
	Louis A. Webster		
	William H. Wellen		
	Patrick J. Welsh	October 8, 1893	
	Levi Lincoln Wetherbee		
	Ralph Wheelright		
	Renton Whidden		
	Joseph C. White	January 1, 1899	
	Sidney M. Williams		
	John Chester Wilson	August 14, 1889	
	Carl A. Woekel		
	Lawrence Theodore Woolfenden		
	Arthur Lincoln Youngman		
	Michael Zack		

== See also ==
- 1930 Massachusetts gubernatorial election
- 71st United States Congress
- List of Massachusetts General Courts
