= Martha N. Brookings =

American politician (1881–1967)

Martha Nutting Brookings
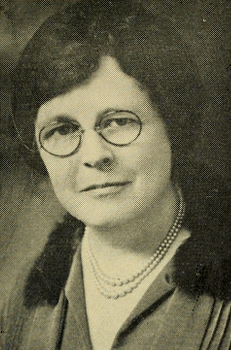

Member of the Massachusetts House of Representatives from the 16th Essex district district
- In office 1927–1930

Martha Nutting Brookings (November 16, 1881 – April 12, 1967) was an American Republican politician from Gloucester, Massachusetts. She represented the 16th Essex district in the Massachusetts House of Representatives from 1927 to 1930.

Brookings was born Martha Nutting Brooks. She married Walter Dubois Brookings in 1929.

Brookings died in Alexandria, Virginia on April 12, 1967 at the age of 86.

== See also ==
- 1927-1928 Massachusetts legislature
- 1929-1930 Massachusetts legislature
