= Samuel H. Wragg =

American politician (1882-1959)

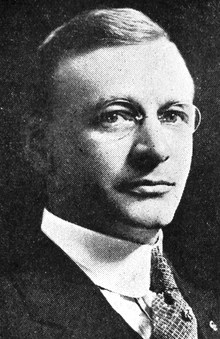
- Samuel Wragg, circa 1923

Norfolk County, Massachusetts Sheriff
- In office 1939–1959
- Preceded by: Samuel Capen
- Succeeded by: Peter M. McCormack

President of the Massachusetts Senate
- In office 1937–1939
- Preceded by: James G. Moran
- Succeeded by: Joseph R. Cotton

Member of the Massachusetts Senate
- In office 1925–1939
- Preceded by: Frank G. Allen
- Succeeded by: Mason Sears
- Constituency: 1st Norfolk District (1925-27); Norfolk and Middlesex District (1927-39)

Personal details
- Born: June 9, 1882 Needham, Massachusetts
- Died: May 13, 1959 (aged 76) Needham, Massachusetts
- Party: Republican

Samuel H. Wragg (June 9, 1882 – May 13, 1959) was an American politician who served as President of the Massachusetts Senate from 1937 to 1939 and sheriff of Norfolk County, Massachusetts, from 1939 to 1959.

== Early life ==
Wragg was born on June 9, 1882, in Needham, Massachusetts. He attended public schools in Needham and worked in manufacturing before entering politics.

== Political career ==
Wragg served on the Needham Board of Selectmen from 1914 to 1920 and in the Massachusetts House of Representatives from 1919 to 1924. In 1924, Wragg was elected to the Massachusetts Senate. During his tenure in the Senate, Wragg chaired the Joint Committee on Municipal Finance and the special commission on public expenditures and was a member of the rules, conservation, and public welfare committees. From 1931 to 1955, Wragg also served as Needham's town moderator.

=== Senate leadership ===
In 1935, Republican James G. Moran was elected president of the Senate with the votes of 19 Democrats and 1 Republican. Moran routinely sided with the Democrats and the majority of Republican Senators voted to form a steering committee, chaired by Wragg, which would serve as the party's official organization in the Senate. In July 1936, Wragg announced that he would seek the Senate presidency in the 1937-38 session. Wragg secured more Republican support than floor leader Donald W. Nicholson and was elected president.

=== Sheriff of Norfolk County ===
In 1938, Wragg was elected Sheriff of Norfolk County. He held the position until his death on May 13, 1959.

== See also ==
- Massachusetts legislature: 1919, 1920, 1921–1922, 1923–1924, 1925–1926, 1927–1928, 1929–1930, 1931–1932, 1933–1934, 1935–1936, 1937–1938
