= John Patrick Connolly =

American politician (1894–1971)

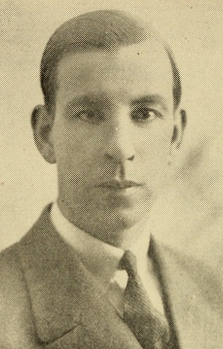

Member of the Boston City Council
- In office 1959–1961
- Preceded by: Gabriel F. Piemonte
- Succeeded by: Gabriel F. Piemonte / John J. Tierney^{1}

Clerk of the Suffolk Superior Court of Civil Business
- In office 1936–1939
- Preceded by: Francis A. Campbell
- Succeeded by: James F. McDermott

Member of the Massachusetts House of Representatives for the 9th Suffolk District
- In office 1929–1933

Personal details
- Born: June 28, 1894 Lowell, Massachusetts
- Died: October 30, 1971 (aged 77)
- Party: Democratic
- Education: Suffolk Law School

John Patrick Connolly (June 28, 1894 – October 30, 1971) was an American politician who served as clerk of the Suffolk Superior Court of Civil Business from 1936 to 1939. He was convicted of bribery in 1941 for receiving kickbacks from court employees. He later returned to elected office as a Boston City Councilor

== Early life ==
Connolly was born on June 28, 1894, in Lowell, Massachusetts. He graduated from Suffolk Law School.

== Political career ==
=== Early career ===
From 1929 to 1933, Connolly represented the 9th Suffolk District in the Massachusetts House of Representatives. From 1935 to 1937 he was an assistant attorney general in the office of Paul A. Dever.

=== Suffolk Superior Court ===
Connolly was elected clerk of the Suffolk Superior Court of Civil Business in 1936. He assumed office on December 1, 1936, succeeding the deceased Francis A. Campbell. After taking office, Connolly fired nearly 50 clerks, all without a reason. The dismissed employees filed complaints with Attorney General Dever and Governor Charles F. Hurley. In 1938, one of the terminated employees hired attorney Reuben L. Laurie to investigate the firings. The following year the matter was referred to the Boston Bar Association. On June 16, 1939, the Boston Bar Association filed a petition with the Massachusetts Supreme Judicial Court for Connolly's removal. The petition alleged that Connolly, his principal clerk, and another legal figure coerced clerk's office employees to pay Connolly kickbacks in order to retain their jobs. The Bar Association also accused Connolly of forcing employees to work on his reelection campaign, hiring lawyers who did little work for the office, and having employees intercede in traffic cases. On July 19, 1939, five days before his removal hearing was to begin, Connolly resigned his office. James F. McDermott, who was appointed to succeed Connolly on an acting basis, removed employees hired by Connolly and offered reinstatement to those Connolly had fired. In December 1939, Laurie's evidence against Connolly was presented to a grand jury. The grand jury returned six indictments against Connolly and his co-conspirator, William T. Conway. Connolly and Conway's trial began on March 4, 1940. The pair were found guilty of bribery. Connolly was sentenced to three to four years in the State Prison. His sentence was stayed pending appeal. His conviction was upheld and he began serving his sentence on April 8, 1941.

=== Release from prison ===
On September 2, 1943, the Massachusetts State Parole Board voted to parole Connolly on October 7 of that year. Upon his release, Connolly worked as a union business agent at the Bethlehem Atlantic Works in East Boston. In 1947, Connolly was recommended for a pardon by Governor Maurice J. Tobin, but on the advice of Attorney General Clarence A. Barnes, the Massachusetts Governor's Council’s Committee on Pardons voted 4 to 1 to deny the pardon. On December 20, 1950, the Governor's Council voted 6 to 2 in favor of pardoning Connolly. According to Governor Paul A. Dever, the pardon was granted to allow Connolly to take the civil service exam. From 1950 to 1960, Connolly worked as a night shift laborer for the Metropolitan Transit Authority. He also served as president of Laborers Local 223 and a delegate to the Boston Central Labor Union. After reaching the mandatory retirement age of 65, the MTA rehired Connolly as a legal counsel for its detective force. His final job was with the Boston park's department.

=== Boston City Council ===
Connolly was an unsuccessful candidate for the Boston City Council in 1951, 1953, 1955, and 1957. In 1959 he won a seat on the council by finishing 9th in a race where only 8 incumbents ran for reelection. He defeated his nearest opponent, teacher and first-time candidate Thomas A. Sullivan, by less than 1,000 votes. In 1961, Connolly lost his bid for reelection, finishing 17th in the general election.

Connolly died on October 30, 1971, at the age of 77.

== See also ==
- 1929–1930 Massachusetts legislature
- 1931–1932 Massachusetts legislature

== Notes ==
1. In the 1961 city council election, the nine candidates with the most votes were elected to the council. Connolly and fellow incumbent Frederick C. Langone finished outside the top nine so their seats went to challengers Gabriel F. Piemonte and John J. Tierney.
