= Horace T. Cahill =

American politician (1894-1976)

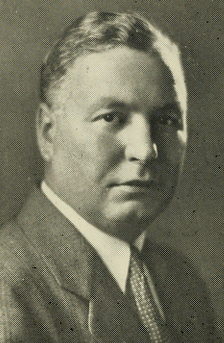
- Horace Cahill, circa 1935

54th Lieutenant Governor of Massachusetts
- In office January 5, 1939 – January 3, 1945
- Governor: Leverett Saltonstall
- Preceded by: Francis E. Kelly
- Succeeded by: Robert F. Bradford

Speaker of the Massachusetts House of Representatives
- In office 1937–1938
- Preceded by: Leverett Saltonstall
- Succeeded by: Christian Herter

Personal details
- Born: December 12, 1894 New York City
- Died: August 22, 1976 (aged 81) Quincy, Massachusetts
- Party: Republican

Horace Tracy Cahill (December 12, 1894 – August 22, 1976) was an American politician who served in the Massachusetts House of Representatives, as Speaker of the Massachusetts House of Representatives and, from 1939 to 1945, as the 54th lieutenant governor of Massachusetts. In 1944 Cahill was the unsuccessfully Republican candidate for governor.

== Early life ==
Cahill was born to George William and Alice Gertrude (Dallon) Cahill in New York City on December 12, 1894. After his father's death Cahill moved with his family to Boston, Massachusetts.

== Career ==
Prior to becoming a politician, Cahill served in the United States Army in World War I. From 1947 to 1973 he was a Superior Court judge. There is an auditorium in Braintree, Massachusetts named in his honor.

== See also ==
- Massachusetts legislature: 1929–1930, 1931–1932, 1933–1934, 1935–1936, 1937–1938

Party political offices
| Preceded by Leverett Saltonstall | Republican nominee for Lieutenant Governor of Massachusetts; 1938, 1940, 1942 | Succeeded by Robert F. Bradford |
| Preceded by Leverett Saltonstall | Republican nominee for Governor of Massachusetts; 1944 | Succeeded by Robert F. Bradford |
Massachusetts House of Representatives
| Preceded by Leverett Saltonstall | Speaker of the Massachusetts House of Representatives; 1937 – 1939 | Succeeded by Christian Herter |
Political offices
| Preceded by Francis E. Kelly | Lieutenant Governor of Massachusetts; 1939 – 1945 | Succeeded by Robert F. Bradford |
