= Edward J. Connelly =

American politician

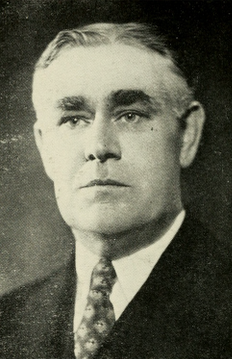
- Portrait of Edward Connelly member of the Massachusetts House of Representatives

Member of the Massachusetts House of Representatives from the 19th Middlesex district
- In office 1935–1937
- Preceded by: Maynard Clemons
- Succeeded by: Joseph Hines

Personal details
- Born: October 10, 1876 Chelsea, Massachusetts
- Died: December 28, 1960 (aged 84) Wakefield, Massachusetts
- Party: Democratic
- Spouse: Kathryn I. Cuff
- Occupation: Soldier; Retail merchant Politician
- Awards: Croix de Guerre; Distinguished Flying Cross; Silver Star

Military service
- Branch/service: United States Army
- Rank: Colonel

Edward J. Connelly (October 10, 1876 – December 28, 1960) was an American military officer during World War I. He would later serve in the Massachusetts House of Representatives.

== Early life ==
Connelly was born on October 10, 1876, in Chelsea, Massachusetts. His family later moved to Wakefield, Massachusetts and he graduated from Wakefield High School.

== Military career ==
Connelly enlisted as a private in the Massachusetts Volunteer Militia, which saw action in Puerto Rico during the Spanish–American War. He later served in the 104th Infantry Regiment, where he rose to the rank of captain. Shortly after the Armistice was signed, Connelly was severely wounded. He was awarded the Croix de guerre and was presented with the Distinguished Flying Cross by General John J. Pershing. On June 3, 1919, he was awarded the Silver Star for his actions during the Battle of Seicheprey.

== Post-military career ==
After he returned home, Connelly established the People's Clothing Store in Wakefield. He was also incorporator of the Wakefield Savings Bank and a director of the Wakefield Chamber of Commerce and the Wakefield Cooperative Bank.

Connelly was involved in politics as well. He served on Wakefield's Finance Board and was a member of Massachusetts House of Representatives from 1935 to 1937.

Connelly was a founder of the local American Legion post and was also a member of the Veterans of Foreign Wars, United Spanish War Veterans, Yankee Division Veterans Association, Benevolent and Protective Order of Elks, Knights of Columbus, and Ancient Order of Hibernians.

== Death and legacy ==
Connelly died on December 28, 1960, in Wakefield. Wakefield's Connelly Park and the Edward J. Connelly Criminal Justice Training Center in Agawam, Massachusetts are named after Connelly.

== See also ==
- 1935–1936 Massachusetts legislature
