= Harvey A. Gallup =

American politician

Harvey Alpheus Gallup
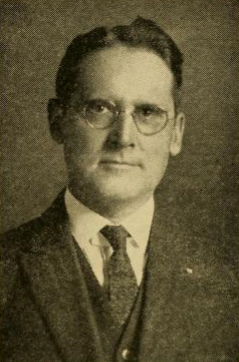

Member of the Massachusetts State Senate Berkshire District
- In office 1925–1928
- Preceded by: William A. O'Hearn

12th Mayor of North Adams, Massachusetts
- In office 1921–1922
- Preceded by: Ezra D. Whitaker
- Succeeded by: William K. Greer

Member of the North Adams, Massachusetts City Council

Personal details
- Born: October 16, 1869 Clarksburg, Massachusetts
- Died: August 6, 1946 (aged 76) Adams, Massachusetts
- Party: Republican
- Spouse(s): Edith Adele Dibble; m. January 18, 1893; Kathryn L. Lyons m. October 16, 1933
- Children: Katheryn F. Gallup, Harvey A. Gallup, Harry W. Gallup Elizabeth W. Gallup, d. November 27, 1990
- Profession: Insurance agent, Real Estate and Investment Securities

Harvey Alpheus Gallup (1869–1946) was an American politician who served as a Massachusetts State Senator, on the city council, and as the twelfth Mayor of North Adams, Massachusetts. Records indicate he was either born on Oct. 7 or 17th in Clarksburg, Berkshire County, Massachusetts and died on August 6, 1946, in Adams, Berkshire County, Massachusetts.

== Insurance Agency ==
In 1891 Gallup formed the Harvey A. Gallup Agency with his brother Clarence.

== See also ==
- 1925–1926 Massachusetts legislature
- 1927–1928 Massachusetts legislature

== Notes ==
Political offices
Preceded by Ezra D. Whitaker	12th Mayor of North Adams, Massachusetts; 1921–1922	Succeeded by William K. Greer
