= Thomas J. Lane =

American politician (1898–1994)

Thomas Lane
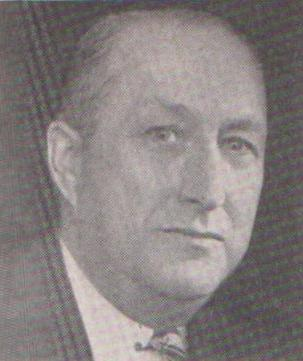

Member of the Massachusetts Governor's Council from the 5th district
- In office 1965–1977
- Preceded by: John Buckley
- Succeeded by: John Markey

Member of the U.S. House of Representatives from Massachusetts's 7th district
- In office December 30, 1941 – January 3, 1963
- Preceded by: Lawrence J. Connery
- Succeeded by: F. Bradford Morse (redistricting)

Member of the Massachusetts Senate from the 5th Essex district
- In office 1939–1941
- Preceded by: James Meehan
- Succeeded by: Michael Flanagan

Member of the Massachusetts House of Representatives
- In office 1927–1938

Personal details
- Born: Thomas Joseph Lane; July 6, 1898 Lawrence, Massachusetts, U.S.
- Died: June 14, 1994 (aged 95) Lawrence, Massachusetts, U.S.
- Party: Democratic
- Education: Suffolk University (LLB)

Thomas Joseph Lane (July 6, 1898 – June 14, 1994) was a U.S. representative from Massachusetts from 1941 to 1963, notable for having been re-elected after serving time in federal prison.

Lane was born in Lawrence, Massachusetts on July 6, 1898 and graduated from Lawrence High School. Lane received an LL.B. in 1925 from Suffolk University Law School in Boston, Mass and then served in the United States Army.

== Massachusetts General Court ==
Lane was lawyer in private practice and a member of the Massachusetts House of Representatives from 1927 to 1938 and a member of the Massachusetts Senate from 1939 to 1941.

== Congress ==
Lane was elected as a Democrat to the Seventy-seventh Congress, by special election, to fill the vacancy caused by the death of United States Representative Lawrence J. Connery, and reelected to the Seventy-eighth and the nine succeeding Congresses. Lane, also, sponsored the legislation in the House of Representatives that called for the National Conference on Citizenship (NCoC) to become a Congressional – chartered organization. He later served on the Board of the Directors of the NCoC. He served from December 30, 1941 to January 3, 1963.

In 1956, Lane was re-elected after serving four months in prison for evading $38,542 in income taxes.

== Later life ==
Lane was an unsuccessful candidate for reelection to the Eighty-eighth Congress in 1962. He served as a member of the Governor’s Council for the Commonwealth of Massachusetts from 1965 to 1977.

He died on June 14, 1994, in Lawrence, Massachusetts and his interment was at Holy Sepulchre Cemetery, North Andover, Massachusetts.

== See also ==
- Massachusetts legislature: 1927–1928, 1929–1930, 1931–1932, 1933–1934, 1935–1936, 1937–1938, 1939, 1941–1942
- List of American federal politicians convicted of crimes
- List of federal political scandals in the United States
- Suffolk University Law School

U.S. House of Representatives
Preceded by Lawrence J. Connery	Member of the U.S. House of Representatives from Massachusetts's 7th congressional district 1941–1963	Succeeded by Torbert Macdonald
