= John K. Burgess =

American politician

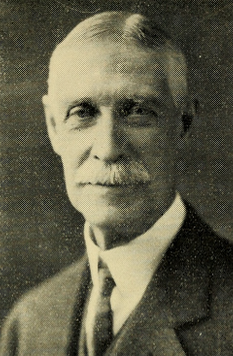
John K. Burgess in 1929

John K. Burgess (circa 1863–1941) was a selectmen and state representative from Dedham, Massachusetts. He lived in the Broad Oak estate. At the time of his death in 1941, he was 78 years old and a retired farmer and engineer.

Burgess was a selectman from 1921 to 1927 and served in the Great and General Court during the same time period. He was a member of the Union Club of Boston and a director of the Dedham Institution for Savings. He was survived by a daughter, Barbara Royce. He was a descendant of Ebenezer Burgess.

Burgess was buried in Old Village Cemetery.

== See also ==
- 1925–1926 Massachusetts legislature
- 1927–1928 Massachusetts legislature
- 1929–1930 Massachusetts legislature
- 1931–1932 Massachusetts legislature
