= Joseph R. Cotton =

American jurist and politician (1890–1983)

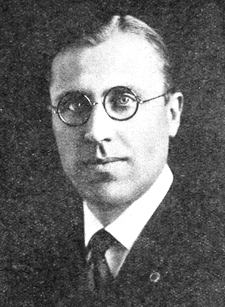
- Joseph R. Cotton, circa 1923

President of the Massachusetts Senate
- In office 1939–1941
- Preceded by: Samuel H. Wragg
- Succeeded by: Angier Goodwin

Chair of the Massachusetts Department of Public Utilities
- In office 1939–1940
- Preceded by: Francis M. McKeown
- Succeeded by: Carroll L. Meins

Member of the Massachusetts Senate from the 7th Middlesex District
- In office 1927–1941
- Preceded by: Charles P. Howard
- Succeeded by: Arthur W. Coolidge

Personal details
- Born: Joseph Russell Cotton; November 16, 1890 Charlestown, Boston
- Died: October 28, 1983 (aged 92)
- Party: Republican
- Education: Harvard College; Harvard Law School
- Occupation: Lawyer; Judge

Joseph Russell Cotton (November 16, 1890 – October 28, 1983) was an American jurist and politician who served as a judge of the Massachusetts Land Court and President of the Massachusetts Senate.

== Early life ==
Cotton was born on November 16, 1890, in Charlestown. His father, Henry Ward Beecher Cotton, was an attorney and a member of the Boston Common Council from 1880 to 1881. Cotton's family moved to Lexington, Massachusetts, when he was three years old. He attended Lexington public schools, Roxbury Latin School, and graduated from the Boston University School of Law in 1912. He practiced law for many years with his father. During World War I, Cotton served in the United States Army at Camps Devens and Grant, but was never sent oversees. He was mustered out of the Army following the Armistice of November 11, 1918 and later served as the first commander of Lexington's American Legion post.

== Political career ==
In 1919, Cotton was elected town moderator of Lexington. Two years later he was elected to the town's board of selectmen. In 1923 he was elected to the Massachusetts House of Representatives and in 1927 he was elected to the Massachusetts Senate in the 7th Middlesex District. In 1928 he faced a tough primary fight against Alice F. D. Pearson, the wife of former Senator Gardner Pearson. Cotton won 6,115 votes to 4,576. He was never challenged for the Republican nomination again. In 1938, Senate President Samuel H. Wragg was elected Sheriff of Norfolk County, Massachusetts, and Cotton was chosen to succeed him with little opposition. In December 1939, Cotton was appointed to the additional position of chairman of the state Public Utilities Commission. Cotton did not run for reelection in 1940 and instead was named secretary to Massachusetts Governor Leverett Saltonstall.

== Judicial career ==
In 1943, Cotton was appointed as an associate judge of the Massachusetts Land Court. He remained on the court until his retirement in 1965.

== Death ==
Cotton died on October 28, 1983, following a long illness.

== See also ==
- Massachusetts legislature: 1923–1924, 1927–1928, 1929–1930, 1931–1932, 1933–1934, 1935–1936, 1937–1938, 1939
