= Maynard Clemons =

American politician

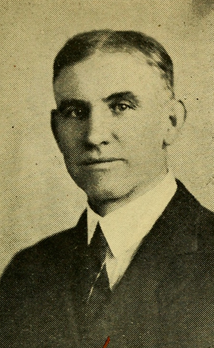
- Maynard Clemons Massachusetts House of Representatives 1923

Member of the Massachusetts House of Representatives from the 19th Middlesex district
- In office 1933–1935
- Preceded by: Charles F. Young
- Succeeded by: Edward J. Connelly
- In office 1923–1931
- Preceded by: Jordan P. Loring
- Succeeded by: Charles F. Young

Personal details
- Born: December 11, 1866 Saugus, Massachusetts
- Died: November 18, 1946 (aged 79) Boston
- Party: Republican
- Spouse: Lilla F. Goodwin
- Education: Boston University Law School
- Occupation: Attorney; Politician

Maynard E. S. Clemons (1866-1946) was an American attorney and politician who served as Town Counsel of Wakefield, Massachusetts, and was a member of the Massachusetts House of Representatives.

Clemons was born on December 11, 1866, in Saugus, Massachusetts. He graduated from the Punchard Free School and Boston University Law School.

From 1899 to 1938 he was Town Counsel of Wakefield.

From 1923 to 1931, Clemons represented the 19th Middlesex District in the Massachusetts House of Representatives. He was defeated by Charles F. Young in 1930 by 53 votes. He defeated Young in 1932 and served one more term in the House. During his tenure in the House, Clemons was chairman of the House Committee on Legal Affairs and was one of the leaders of the legislature.

Clemons also had a law office in Boston and was a trustee of and attorney for the Charlestown Five Cents Savings Bank. On November 18, 1946, Clemons suffered a heart attack at the Old State House subway entrance. He was pronounced dead on arrival at Boston City Hospital.

== See also ==
- 1923–1924 Massachusetts legislature
- 1925–1926 Massachusetts legislature
- 1927–1928 Massachusetts legislature
- 1929–1930 Massachusetts legislature
- 1933–1934 Massachusetts legislature
