= James M. McCracken =

American politician

James M. McCracken was a Massachusetts politician.

McCracken represented Dedham, Needham and Wellesley, Massachusetts in the Massachusetts House of Representatives.

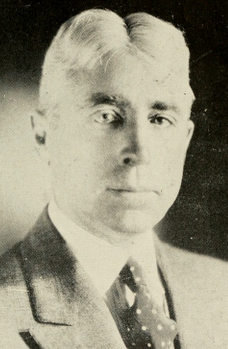
James M. McCracken

== See also ==
- 1933–1934 Massachusetts legislature
- 1935–1936 Massachusetts legislature
