= Angier Goodwin =

American politician (1881-1975)

Angier Louis Goodwin
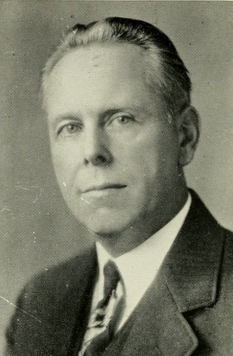

Member of the U.S. House of Representatives from Massachusetts's 8th district
- In office January 3, 1943 – January 3, 1955
- Preceded by: Arthur Daniel Healey
- Succeeded by: Torbert Macdonald

Chairman of the Massachusetts Commission on Administration and Finance
- In office 1941–1942
- Preceded by: Patrick J. Moynihan
- Succeeded by: Paul W. Foster

President of the Massachusetts Senate
- In office 1941–1941
- Preceded by: Joseph R. Cotton
- Succeeded by: Jarvis Hunt

Member of the Massachusetts Senate from the 4th Middlesex district
- In office 1929–1941
- Preceded by: Alvin E. Bliss
- Succeeded by: Sumner G. Whittier

Mayor of Melrose, Massachusetts
- In office 1921 – January 2, 1923
- Preceded by: Charles H. Adams
- Succeeded by: Paul H. Provandle

Member of the Massachusetts House of Representatives from the 22nd Middlesex district
- In office 1925–1928
- Preceded by: Charles H. Gilmore
- Succeeded by: Mary Livermore Barrows

Personal details
- Born: January 30, 1881 Fairfield, Maine
- Died: June 20, 1975 (aged 94)
- Party: Republican
- Education: Colby College; Harvard Law School

Angier Louis Goodwin (January 30, 1881 – June 20, 1975) was a United States representative from Massachusetts.

Goodwin graduated from Colby College in 1902, and from Harvard Law School three years later. He was admitted to the Maine bar that same year and the Massachusetts bar in the next, and practiced law in Boston.

He became a member of the Melrose, Massachusetts Board of Aldermen in 1912, and served until 1914. Goodwin rejoined the board in 1916, and served four more years; he served as president in 1920. He was mayor of Melrose from 1921 to 1923.

Goodwin became a member of the Massachusetts State Guard and legal adviser to aid draft registrants during the First World War. He was a member of the Planning Board and chairman of the Board of Appeal in Melrose between 1923 and 1925.

He served in the Massachusetts House of Representatives from 1925 to 1928, and was a member of the Massachusetts Senate from 1929 to 1941, serving as Senate president in his last year. Goodwin was chairman of the Massachusetts Commission on Participation in the New York World's Fair in 1939 and 1940, and chairman of the Massachusetts Commission on Administration and Finance in 1942.

Goodwin was elected as a Republican to the Seventy-eighth and to the five succeeding Congresses (January 3, 1943 – January 3, 1955). Defeated for re-election to Congress in 1954, he was a member of the Massachusetts State Board of Tax Appeals from 1955 to 1960.

== See also ==
- Massachusetts legislature: 1925–1926, 1927–1928, 1929–1930, 1931–1932, 1933–1934, 1935–1936, 1937–1938, 1939, 1941–1942

Political offices
Preceded by	Mayor of Melrose, Massachusetts; 1921 – January 2, 1923	Succeeded by Paul H. Provandle
Preceded by Joseph R. Cotton	President of the Massachusetts Senate; 1941	Succeeded by Jarvis Hunt
U.S. House of Representatives
Preceded by Arthur D. Healey	Member of the U.S. House of Representatives from Massachusetts's 8th congressional district January 3, 1943 – January 3, 1955	Succeeded by Torbert H. Macdonald
