= Gaspar G. Bacon =

American politician (1886–1947)

Gaspar Griswold Bacon Sr.
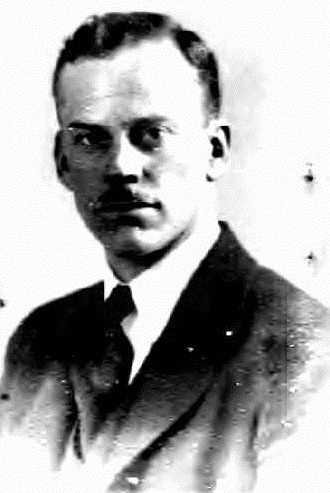
- Bacon, c. 1920

51st Lieutenant Governor of Massachusetts
- In office 1933–1935
- Governor: Joseph B. Ely
- Preceded by: William S. Youngman
- Succeeded by: Joseph L. Hurley

President of the Massachusetts Senate
- In office 1929–1932
- Preceded by: Wellington Wells
- Succeeded by: Erland F. Fish

Member of the Massachusetts Senate from the 6th Suffolk district
- In office 1925–1932

Personal details
- Born: March 7, 1886 Jamaica Plain, Boston, U.S.
- Died: December 25, 1947 (aged 61) Dedham, Massachusetts, U.S.
- Party: Republican
- Spouse: Priscilla Toland (m. 1910)
- Children: Gaspar G. Bacon Jr.
- Parent: Robert Bacon
- Relatives: Robert Low Bacon, brother
- Profession: Lawyer

Gaspar Griswold Bacon Sr. (March 7, 1886 – December 25, 1947) was an American politician who served as the president of the Massachusetts Senate from 1929 to 1932 and as the 51st lieutenant governor of Massachusetts from 1933 to 1935.

== Biography ==
Bacon was born in Jamaica Plain, Boston, on March 7, 1886, to Robert Bacon. Bacon had a brother, Robert L. Bacon.

Bacon received his undergraduate degree from Harvard College in 1908; he then went on to earn his law degree from Harvard Law School in 1912.

In 1912, Bacon actively campaigned for Theodore Roosevelt and the Progressive Party. He was involved in the founding of the Military School at Harvard College in 1919. He was also a lecturer on the staff of Boston University in the late 1920s. He also served on the board of overseers of Harvard University.

In 1920, he was a supporter of Leonard Wood's campaign for the Republican nomination for president and was a delegate to the Republican National Convention that year. Bacon served in the Massachusetts State Senate in from 1925 to 1932. From 1933 to 1934, he was Lieutenant Governor of Massachusetts.

In 1934, Bacon was the Republican nominee for Massachusetts Governor. An opponent of Franklin Roosevelt's New Deal, Bacon was defeated by Boston Mayor James Michael Curley.

Bacon was in American forces sent to Mexico under General Pershing in 1916. Bacon was in the Field Artillery Officers' Reserve Corps, where he served as a captain and major during World War I.

During World War I, Bacon was a lieutenant colonel on General George Patton's staff, where he served for three years and ten months, in the G5, as the chief of the Government Affairs Branch.

Bacon died on Christmas Day, December 25, 1947, in Dedham, Massachusetts. His funeral was held at St. Paul's Protestant Episcopal Church. He was buried in Walnut Hills Cemetery in Brookline, Massachusetts.

Bacon was elected a member of the Ancient and Honorable Artillery Company of Massachusetts on April 6, 1925 and served until his death on Christmas Day 1947.

== Awards ==
- Croix de Guerre
- Legion of Honor

== Family life ==
Bacon married Priscilla Toland on July 16, 1910, in St. Thomas' Church in Whitemarsh, Pennsylvania. Bacon and his wife were the parents of three sons. One of Bacon's sons was the actor Gaspar G. Bacon Jr., better known as David Bacon.

== See also ==
- 1925–1926 Massachusetts legislature
- 1927–1928 Massachusetts legislature
- 1929–1930 Massachusetts legislature
- 1931–1932 Massachusetts legislature

== Publications ==
- Bacon, Gaspar G. The Constitution of the United States in Some of Its Fundamental Aspects. Cambridge, Massachusetts: Harvard University Press, 1928. OCLC 1201082
- Bacon, Gaspar G. The Founding of the Town of Barnstable, Commonwealth of Massachusetts: 1639–1939, Tercentenary Address. Barnstable, MA: [publisher not identified], 1939. OCLC 828629383
- Bacon, Gaspar G. Political Parties in the United States: Empty Bottles or Flowing Streams. Boston, Mass. : [publisher not identified], 1940. OCLC 958275937
- Bacon, Gaspar G., and Wendell Dearborn Howie. One by One. Cambridge, Massachusetts: [Harvard University Print. Office], 1943. OCLC 1446768

Party political offices
Preceded by William S. Youngman	Republican nominee for Lieutenant Governor of Massachusetts; 1932	Succeeded by John W. Haigis
Preceded by William S. Youngman	Republican nominee for Governor of Massachusetts; 1934	Succeeded by John W. Haigis
Political offices
Preceded by Wellington Wells	President of the Massachusetts Senate; 1929-1932	Succeeded by Erland F. Fish
Preceded by William S. Youngman	Lieutenant Governor of Massachusetts; 1933–1935	Succeeded by Joseph L. Hurley
