= Sylvia Donaldson =

American politician

M. Sylvia Donaldson
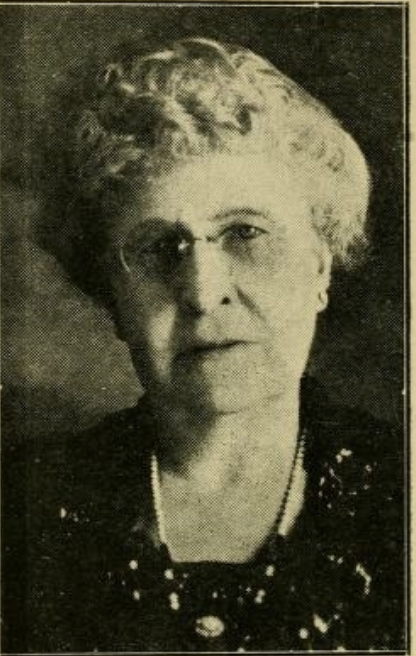

Member of the Massachusetts House of Representatives from the 10th Plymouth district
- In office 1924–1930

Personal details
- Born: July 12, 1849 Falmouth, Massachusetts, U.S.
- Died: June 15, 1937 (aged 87)
- Resting place: Oak Grove Cemetery
- Party: Republican
- Education: Boston University

M. Sylvia Donaldson (July 12, 1849 – June 15, 1937) was one of the first women elected to the Massachusetts House of Representatives. She was elected in 1924 at the age of seventy-three and served until 1930. Donaldson, a Republican, represented the tenth district (Plymouth/Brockton).

== Life and career ==
Donaldson was born in Falmouth, Massachusetts on July 12, 1849. She studied to be a teacher at Boston University. She taught in the Brockton School District from 1873 to 1919 where she was principal and served on the school board.

In 1923, the first women, Donaldson and Susan Fitzgerald, were elected to the Massachusetts State Legislature. Donaldson served as honorary Speaker of the House on February 18, 1926. In addition to her work as a teacher and legislator, Donaldson was active in the Audubon Society, Daughters of the American Revolution, the National Education Association, League of Women Voters, and the Women's Civic Federation.

Stonehill College has created The Sylvia Donaldson Society for Women in Politics for female students at Stonehill College.

== See also ==
- Massachusetts House of Representatives' 10th Plymouth district
- 1923–1924 Massachusetts legislature
- 1925–1926 Massachusetts legislature
- 1927–1928 Massachusetts legislature
- 1929–1930 Massachusetts legislature
