= Leo Birmingham =

American businessman and politician

Leo M. Birmingham
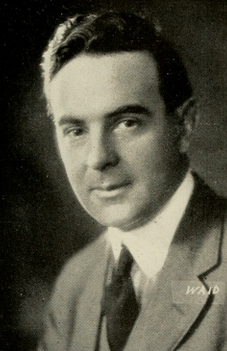
- Portrait, 1935
- Born: April 14, 1893; Brighton, Boston, United States
- Died: January 15, 1936 (aged 42)
- Education: Boston College
- Occupations: Businessman, politician
- Political party: Democratic

Leo M. Birmingham (April 14, 1893 – January 15, 1936) was an American businessman and politician. Birmingham was born in Boston, Massachusetts, in the Brighton neighborhood. He graduated from the Boston College High School. In 1915, he graduated from Boston College. He served in World War I as a U.S. Navy ensign. He worked for the New England Telephone and Telegraph Company. Birmingham then owned a funeral home in Brighton. He served in the Massachusetts House of Representatives from 1925 until his death in 1936. Birmingham was a Democrat. Birmingham was elected House Democratic Floor Leader in 1929, a position he held until 1934. He died at his home in Brighton after a long illness. Shortly after his death, the House voted to rename Soldier's Field Road Extension as the Leo M. Birmingham Parkway in Brighton.

== See also ==
- Massachusetts legislature: 1925–1926, 1927–1928, 1929–1930, 1931–1932, 1933–1934, 1935–1936
