= Tony Garofano =

American politician and barber

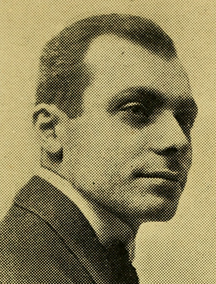
- Tony Garofano Massachusetts House of Representatives 1923

Member of the Massachusetts House of Representatives from the 10th Essex district
- In office 1927–1935

Member of the Massachusetts House of Representatives from the 13th Essex district
- In office 1920; 1923 – 1927

Personal details
- Born: May 28, 1885 Italy
- Died: 1946
- Party: Democrat
- Occupation: Barber

Tony A. Garofano was an American politician and barber who served in the Massachusetts House of Representatives in 1920 and from 1923 to 1935. After leaving the legislature, he served as the chairman of the Board of Registration of Barbers and was an employee in the State Department of Public Works. Garofano was also an incorporator of the Saugus Trust Company, a Saugus, Massachusetts-based Trust company that existed from 1928 until it was purchased by Eastern Bank in 1994.

== See also ==
- 1920 Massachusetts legislature
- 1923–1924 Massachusetts legislature
- 1925–1926 Massachusetts legislature
- 1927–1928 Massachusetts legislature
- 1929–1930 Massachusetts legislature
- 1931–1932 Massachusetts legislature
- 1933–1934 Massachusetts legislature
