= Marion Cowan Burrows =

American politician

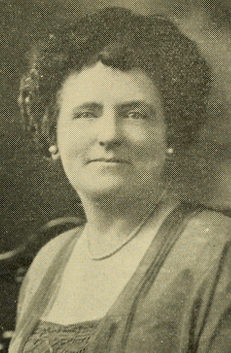
Portrait of Marion Cowan Burrows, circa 1929

Marion Cowan Burrows (May 7, 1865? – November 13, 1952) was an American physician, pharmacist, and state legislator in Massachusetts.

== Early life and education ==
Marion Cowan was born in Scranton, Pennsylvania, the daughter of James Cowan and Jane Carey Cowan. Her father was a foreman at a foundry. She earned a pharmacy degree from the Massachusetts College of Pharmacy and a medical degree from Tufts Medical College. She held board certifications in pharmacy from Maine, Massachusetts, and New York.

== Career ==
From 1900 to 1905, Cowan was the chemist and bacteriologist at the Board of Health in Lynn, Massachusetts; she was believed to be the only woman chemist working in such a capacity in the United States at the time. She also ran a small drugstore in Lynn, with her sister Janet. She became the medical inspector of schools in 1905, and continued in that role until 1910.

While married, Burrows was not employed by the city, but instead turned her interest to clubwork and politics. In 1915, she petitioned the state legislature to fund the removal of roadside weeds, as a public health measure. She helped register women to vote in 1920. She was also one of the first women to be a presidential elector from Massachusetts, in 1920. In 1924 she was a delegate to the Republican National Convention in Cleveland. "Politics is not a hobby. Politics is a duty," she explained to a newspaper reporter. "Travel is my hobby."

Burrows ran for the state legislature in 1922, and won the Republican nomination. In 1928, Marion C. Burrows was elected to the Massachusetts legislature, as a Republican representing the 11th Essex district. She also campaigned for Herbert Hoover that year. While in office, she introduced a bill allowing political candidates to use the name by which they are best known, whether or not it is their legal name. She served in office until 1932, one of three women in the Massachusetts legislature at the time.

== Personal life ==
In 1910, Marion Cowan and businessman Charles Irving Burrows eloped, announcing their marriage by letters to friends and family the next day. Marion Cowan Burrows was widowed in 1923. She died in 1952.

== See also ==
- 1929–1930 Massachusetts legislature
- 1931–1932 Massachusetts legislature
