= Mary Livermore Barrows =

American politician (1877–1955)

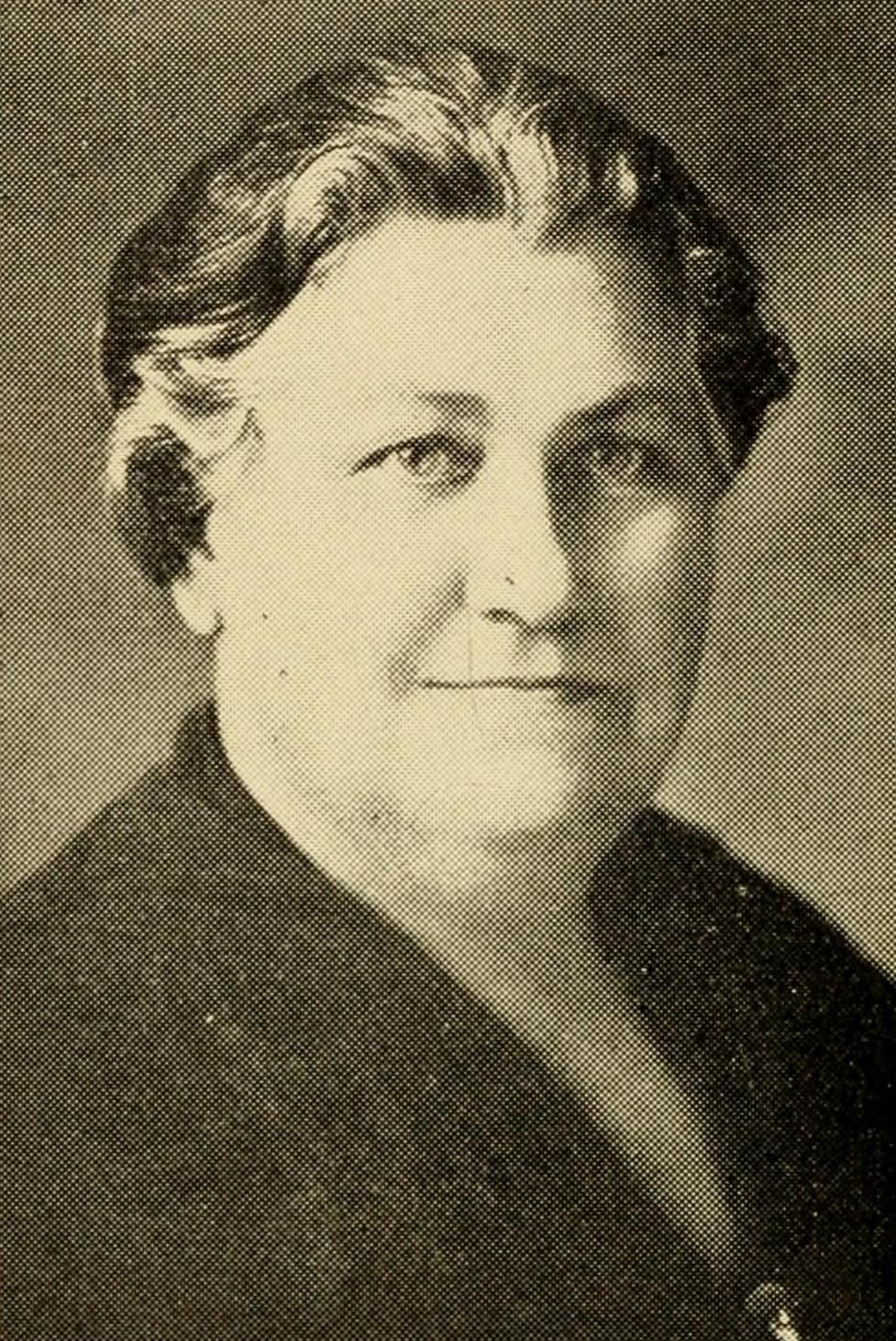
- Barrows c. 1930

Member of the Massachusetts House of Representatives from the 22nd Middlesex district
- In office January 2, 1929 – January 4, 1939
- Preceded by: Angier Goodwin
- Succeeded by: Theodore P. Hollis

Member of the Melrose, Massachusetts Board of Aldermen
- In office 1926–1928

Personal details
- Born: June 30, 1877 Melrose, Massachusetts
- Died: March 1, 1955 (aged 77) Melrose, Massachusetts
- Party: Republican
- Spouse: Malcolm Dana Barrows (1901–d. 1945)
- Children: 2
- Education: Wellesley College

Mary Livermore Norris Barrows (June 30, 1877 – March 1, 1955) was an American politician. She represented Melrose in the Massachusetts House of Representatives.

== Early life and education ==
Born on June 30, 1877, to Oscar and Henrietta White (Livermore) Norris in Melrose, Massachusetts. Barrows was a granddaughter of Mary Livermore. She graduated from Wellesley College, where she was a member of the College Equal Suffrage League. On July 1, 1901, she married Malcolm Dana Barrows, brother of Alice Barrows. They had two sons, Malcolm Jr. and John.

== Political career ==
Before entering the Massachusetts House, Barrows was a member of the Melrose board of aldermen. She was first elected as an alderwoman in 1926, becoming Melrose's first alderwoman.

Barrows was first elected to the Massachusetts House in 1928, and was the first woman to represent Melrose. She retired from the House in 1938.

Barrows was a Republican.

Barrows died on March 1, 1955, in Melrose Hospital.

== See also ==
- Massachusetts legislature: 1929–1930, 1931–1932, 1933–1934, 1935–1936, 1937–1938
