= Joseph C. White =

American politician

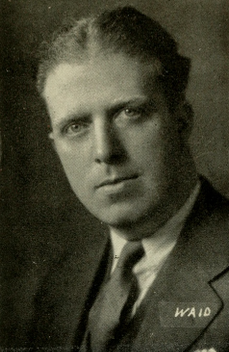
Portrait of Joseph C. White in 1935

Joseph Charles White (1899–1967) was a Massachusetts state senator, state representative, Boston City Council president and chairman of the Boston School Committee. He was the father of Kevin Hagan White who was a mayor of Boston.

White was in the Massachusetts House of Representatives from 1929–1932. He was in the State Senate from 1933–1936. White was a Roman Catholic and a member of the Knights of Columbus.

== See also ==
- Massachusetts legislature: 1929–1930, 1931–1932, 1933–1934, 1935–1936

== Sources ==
- Congressional statement honoring the life of Kevin White
- notes to Oral History interview of James W. Hennigan, Jr
- Political Graveyard listing for White

Preceded by Francis X. Ahearn	President of the Boston City Council; 1954	Succeeded by William F. Hurley
