= Julius H. Soble =

American politician

Julius H. Soble was a member of the Massachusetts House of Representatives. He was born in 1898 He was from Ward 14 in Dorchester. In 1931, he was the youngest member of the House. A lawyer, he was admitted to practice in federal courts. He graduated from Harvard College and Harvard Law School.

== See also ==
- 1931–1932 Massachusetts legislature
- 1933–1934 Massachusetts legislature
