= James E. Hagan =

American politician and businessman (1902-1965)

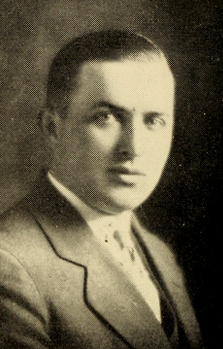
- Portrait of James E. Hagan member of the Massachusetts House of Representatives 1929

21st Mayor of Somerville, Massachusetts
- In office January 1, 1934 – January 6, 1936
- Preceded by: John J. Murphy
- Succeeded by: Leslie E. Knox

Member of the Massachusetts House of Representatives 23rd Middlesex District
- In office 1927–1932

Personal details
- Born: January 25, 1902 Somerville, Massachusetts
- Died: November 1965 (aged 63)
- Party: Democratic
- Profession: Salesman

James E. Hagan (January 25, 1902 – November 1965) was an American businessman and politician who served in the Massachusetts House of Representatives and as the twenty first mayor of Somerville, Massachusetts.

== Mayor of Somerville ==
In October 1933, Hagan defeated eleven other candidates to win Somerville's first non-partisan mayoral primary.

== See also ==
- 1927–1928 Massachusetts legislature
- 1929–1930 Massachusetts legislature
- 1931–1932 Massachusetts legislature
- 1933–1934 Massachusetts legislature

== Notes ==
Political offices
Preceded by John J. Murphy	21st Mayor of Somerville, Massachusetts; January 1, 1934 – January 6, 1936	Succeeded by Leslie E. Knox
