= John J. Murphy =

American politician (1890–1973)

United States Marshal for the District of Massachusetts
- In office 1934–1939
- Preceded by: William J. Keville
- Succeeded by: J. Henry Goguen

Mayor of Somerville, Massachusetts
- In office 1930–1934
- Preceded by: Leon M. Conwell
- Succeeded by: James E. Hagan

Personal details
- Born: 1890 Somerville, Massachusetts
- Died: July 9, 1973 (aged 82) Malden, Massachusetts
- Party: Democratic Party
- Education: Suffolk University Law School
- Occupation: Salesman; Accountant

John J. Murphy (1890–1973) was an American politician who served as mayor of Somerville, Massachusetts and United States Marshal for the District of Massachusetts.

== Early life ==
Murphy was born in 1890 in Somerville. He entered the workforce at the age of 14 and continued his education at the Somerville Evening High School. During World War I he organized a yeomans school and was later placed in charge of recruiting for the 1st Naval District. During this time he met his future wife, Elizabeth Tiffany, who was working as a government clerk in Boston. When Murphy was elected mayor, his wife and their 5-year-old daughter, Barbara, were residing in California while Barbara attempted to become a child actress. After the war, Murphy returned to the electrical company he had worked for as a boy. He eventually became assistant sales manager; however, the job required a lot of traveling and Murphy gave it up to focus on politics. He remained with the company as a sales agent and managed a gas station. In 1918 he graduated from Suffolk University Law School.

== Politics ==
Murphy was an unsuccessful candidate for the Massachusetts Senate in 1916 and the Massachusetts House of Representatives in 1928. He was the Democratic nominee for mayor in 1921, 1923, 1925, and 1927, losing each time. In 1929 he became the first Democrat to win the mayoralty in Somerville. He was reelected in 1931 and was preparing to run again in 1933 until he was offered the position of United States Marshal by President Franklin D. Roosevelt's patronage manager James Farley. Murphy resigned as US Marshal in 1939. In 1944, Murphy was a candidate for the United States House of Representatives seat in Massachusetts's 11th congressional district, but lost the Democratic nomination to incumbent James Michael Curley.

== Later life ==
Elizabeth Tiffany Murphy died in 1938. Murphy later remarried Agnes L. MacAdams. With MacAdams, Murphy had one daughter, MaryAnne, and was stepfather to two sons from her first marriage. After leaving political office, Murphy spent many years as a cost accountant. He died on July 9, 1973, at his home in Malden, Massachusetts.
