= Roland D. Sawyer =

American state legislator (1874–1969)

Member of the Massachusetts General Court
- In office 1913–1941

Personal details
- Born: January 8, 1874 Kensington, New Hampshire, U.S.
- Died: October 1969 (age 95) Kensington, New Hampshire, U.S.
- Party: Socialist (1912-13); Democratic
- Education: Revere Lay College

Roland Douglas Sawyer was a Congregationalist minister and Massachusetts state legislator. He is best remembered as one of the leading Christian socialists of the first decade of the 20th century and as the author of an array of self-published books and pamphlets on genealogy and the local history of New England.

== Biography ==
=== Early years ===
Roland Douglas Sawyer was born January 8, 1874, in Kensington, New Hampshire, the son of a father who was a shoemaker and a mother who taught school. Roland dropped out of school at age 16 to learn he craft of shoemaking from his father, but at the age of 20 he made the decision to change his career path and entered the now defunct Revere Lay College in Revere, Massachusetts, a Protestant evangelical seminary.

Upon graduation from Revere in 1898, Sawyer took a position as a pastor at Hope Chapel in Brockton, Massachusetts, the first of four Congregational churches he would head.

=== Political career ===
The national newspaper The Christian Socialist produced a "Roland D. Sawyer Special" edition in conjunction with his 1912 Massachusetts gubernatorial run.

In about 1907, the previously conservative Sawyer began to gain an interest in Christian socialism, a growing movement in that day.

Sawyer joined the Socialist Party of America and ran for Governor of Massachusetts on the Socialist ticket in 1912.

In 1913, Sawyer ran in a non-partisan race for city council in Ware, Massachusetts. Under the rules of the organization during its early period, Socialists were not permitted to run in non-partisan campaigns without having been previously granted extraordinary permission from the organization, however, and Sawyer was therefore expelled from the Socialist Party of Massachusetts. Following his expulsion, Sawyer joined the Democratic Party.

Running as a Democrat in the fall of 1913, Sawyer ran for the Massachusetts General Court, the state legislature. Unlike his previous electoral experiences, this time Sawyer won his race for office. He ran for re-election and won every two years thereafter for more than a quarter century, sitting in the Massachusetts General Court until 1941.

Sawyer took an interest in the case of Sacco and Vanzetti, two anarchists accused of murder in conjunction with a 1920 armed robbery in South Braintree, Massachusetts, and was active in the unsuccessful campaign to win the pair a stay of execution and a new trial.

In the Massachusetts General Court, Sawyer was regarded as a crusader against political corruption. In 1940 he was the first representative to call for the impeachment of Governor's Councilor Daniel H. Coakley. Coakley would be impeached by the House and found guilty and removed from office by the Senate the following year.

Sawyer ran four more campaigns for higher political office as a Democrat, all without success: for U.S. Congress in 1925 and in 1942, a second try for Governor of Massachusetts in 1928, and a race for U.S. Senate in 1930.

=== Clerical career ===
Sawyer was a Congregationalist minister throughout his life, heading churches at Brockton (1898-1900), Hanson (1900-1905), Ward Hill (1905-1909), and Ware (1909-1950s) in the state of Massachusetts.

Sawyer was also, particularly early in his clerical career, active in conservative social organizations, including the Anti-Profanity League, the Christian Endeavor Society, the Anti-Saloon League, and other temperance organizations. Ironically, as a Massachusetts legislator Sawyer came to believe that liquor prohibition was a failed system with unintended negative consequences and was involved in campaigns for its abolition.

Following his retirement in the 1950s, Sawyer spent his remaining years at his home in Kensington working on research projects in local history and genealogy.

=== Death and legacy ===
Sawyer died in October 1969 at the age of 95.

Sawyer's papers reside in the Milne Special Collections department in the library at the University of New Hampshire in Manchester. The collection runs to 165 archival boxes, some 55 cubic feet (1.6 m^{3}) of material.

An additional 13 boxes of materials, chiefly his dime novel collection, reside at the Athenaeum of Philadelphia.

== See also ==
- Massachusetts legislature: 1915, 1917, 1918, 1919, 1920, 1921–1922, 1923–1924, 1925–1926, 1927–1928, 1929–1930, 1931–1932, 1933–1934, 1935–1936, 1937–1938, 1939

== Works ==
- America's Most Prevalent Vice: A Sermon. Hanson, MA: Anti-Profanity League, n.d. [after 1902].
- "Jesus, Woman and Divorce," The Arena, vol. 41, whole no. 231 (March–June 1909), pp. 304–306.
- The Making of a Socialist. Westwood, MA: Ariel Press, n.d. [1911].
- What Move Shall We Make in the Interests of True Temperance? Ware, MA: Sawyer, 1911.
- Walt Whitman, the Prophet-Poet. Boston, R.G. Badger, 1913.
- The Glad Green Days: Leaves from a Summer Journal. Ware, MA: Sawyer, n.d. [c. 1914].
- My Early Years. Farmington, ME : D.H. Knowlton, 1915.
- The Country Home with the English-Speaking Poets. Farmington, ME : D.H. Knowlton, 1915.
- Under Swaying Pines. Farmington, ME : D.H. Knowlton, 1915. —children's book.
- My Youth and Early Manhood. Farmington, ME : D.H. Knowlton, 1916.
- Tranquil Hours: My Tenth Season in Camp: Excerpts from Newspaper Articles. Ware, MA: Sawyer, 1916.
- Sketches of Kensington History, Rockingham County, New Hampshire... Exeter, NH: Sawyer, 1918–19.
- Epistles from an Unassuming Philosopher: Short Studies in What I Have Learned in My Forty-six Years of Life. Farmington, ME : D.H. Knowlton, 1920.
- The Seven Golden Candle-Sticks and Simplification: My Personal Gospel: Two Preachments. Farmington, ME : D.H. Knowlton, 1922.
- Cal Coolidge, President. Boston: Four Seas Co., 1924.
- Outline History of Kensington. Ware, MA: Sawyer, 1926.
- The Sawyer Family of Hill, New Hampshire: Betfield and Thomas Sawyer, Their Ancestry and Posterity. Ware, MA: Sawyer, n.d. [1928?].
- Two Decades in Ware: A Record of Public service, Pastoral Offices, Intellectual Pursuits, Personal Life. Farmington, ME : D.H. Knowlton, 1929.
- Jesus, as Portrayed by his Earliest Followers: Seven Pen Pictures of the Christ, Selected from Apostolic Material in the Gospels: One Week's Daily Devotional Reading. Ware, MA: Sawyer, n.d. [1920s].
- Man's Love for Wild Nature. Farmington, ME : D.H. Knowlton, n.d. [1920s].
- Charms of the Changing Year. Farmington, ME : D.H. Knowlton, n.d. [1920s].
- Chirps from the Woods. Ware, MA: Sawyer, n.d. [1920s?].
- A Personal Narrative. Farmington, ME : D.H. Knowlton, 1930.
- A Quarter Century in Tent, Cabin and Cottage: Pen Pictures of the Delights of my Summer Seasons at Kensington, NH. Farmington, ME: Knowlton & McLeary, 1932.
- My Mother, Her Family and Ancestry: An Account of the Life, Family and Ancestry of Phoebe Maria (Blake) Sawyer of Kensington, NH... Ware, MA: Sawyer, 1935.
- An Epilogue to the Joys of my Summer Life at Kensington. Farmington, ME : D.H. Knowlton, 1939.
- Material for a History of Kensington, NH: In Three Parts and an Appendix. Kensington, NH: Ware, 1940–42.
- Kensington Vital Statistics, 1737-1907. Ware, MA: Sawyer, 1943.
- The History of Kensington, New Hampshire: 1663 to 1945 (282 years) with a Family and Homestead Register of the Pioneer Families, Early Settlers and Permanent Citizens of the Town. Farmington, ME : D.H. Knowlton, 1946.
- Homesteads of Kensington, Two Hundred and Seventy-Six Years, 1670-1946: Being a Reprint of Chapter 20 of the History of Kensington, NH. Ware, MA: Sawyer, n.d. [c. 1946].
- The Ilsley-Chase Account Books. Salem, MA : Essex Institute, 1950.
- An Historical Sermon Preached in the First Church in Ware, Mass., on August 5, 1951. Ware, MA: Sawyer, 1951.

undated

- A Backward Glance at Summer Joys. Ware, MA: Sawyer, n.d.
- Brentwood Graveyards and Cemeteries. Ware, MA: Sawyer, n.d.
- The World's Great Teachers of Wisdom and Virtue. Ware, MA: Sawyer, n.d.
- The World's Two Christians... Ware, MA: Sawyer, n.d.
