= James G. Moran =

American politician (1870-1941)

President of the Massachusetts Senate
- In office 1935–1936
- Preceded by: Erland F. Fish
- Succeeded by: Samuel H. Wragg

Member of the Massachusetts Senate from the 1st Bristol District
- In office 1923–1936
- Preceded by: Silas D. Reed
- Succeeded by: Jarvis Hunt

Personal details
- Born: May 2, 1870 Mansfield, Massachusetts, U.S.
- Died: April 12, 1941 (aged 71) Mansfield, Massachusetts, U.S.
- Party: Republican
- Spouse: Jane E. Chase (1903-1934; her death)
- Education: Northeastern University Law School
- Occupation: Attorney; Railroad signal tower operator

James G. Moran (May 2, 1870 – April 12, 1941) was an American politician who served as President of the Massachusetts Senate from 1935 to 1936.

== Early life ==
Moran was born on May 2, 1870, in Mansfield, Massachusetts. He graduated from Mansfield High School in 1887. He then spent a year at the Lawrence Academy at Groton. He studied civil engineering at the Massachusetts Institute of Technology, but left after a year due to the death of his father. He then worked for many years as a signal tower operator for the New York, New Haven and Hartford Railroad. On February 19, 1903, Moran married Jane E. Chase of Mansfield. They remained married until her death in September 1934. They had no children. Moran graduated from the Northeastern University School of Law in 1914 and was admitted to the bar in 1916.

== Political career ==
Moran was a member of Mansfield Republican organization since his early years. In 1911 he was appointed postmaster of Mansfield by President William Howard Taft. He was replaced by Taft's Democratic successor, Woodrow Wilson. From 1917 to 1919, Moran was a member of the Massachusetts House of Representatives. He returned to the legislature in 1922 as a member of the Massachusetts Senate. He was the first Mansfield resident elected to the Senate in 56 years.

=== Senate presidency ===
Following the 1934 election, the Senate consisted of 21 Republicans and 19 Democrats. The Democrats wanted to persuade a Republican to run against incumbent Erland F. Fish for the Senate presidency in exchange for an equal division of committee chairmanships. Henry Parkman Jr. was reportedly approached, but Parkman denied working with the Democrats. The Democrats then chose to back Moran, who agreed to run for president. As the most senior member of the Senate, Moran also presided over the balloting for Senate president. The first six ballots ended with Fish and Moran each receiving 19 votes. Moran took a lead on the seventh ballot, with 18 votes to Fish's 17 and three other senators receiving 1 vote each. On the eighth ballot, Republican William A. Davenport switched sides and Moran was elected with 20 votes to Fish's 13 and Samuel H. Wragg's 5. Immediately after reading the result of the vote, Moran collapsed and was carried off to the Senate reading room, where he was attended to by Senator Charles G. Miles, who was a physician. Moran was reported to be under a great deal of strain due to his separation from his Republican colleagues and the stress of presiding over the tumultuous balloting for Senate president. During his tenure as president, Moran often sided with Democratic Governor James Michael Curley. In December 1936, Curley appointed Moran to the state racing commission. Moran died on April 12, 1941, following three years of illness.

== See also ==
- Massachusetts legislature: 1917, 1918, 1919, 1923–1924, 1925–1926, 1927–1928, 1929–1930, 1931–1932, 1933–1934, 1935–1936
