= Donald W. Nicholson =

American politician (1888-1968)

Donald William Nicholson
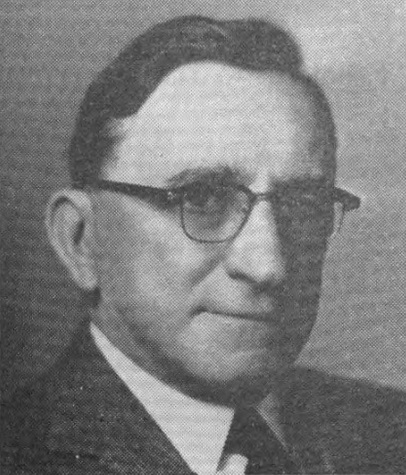

Member of the U.S. House of Representatives from Massachusetts's 9th district
- In office November 18, 1947 – January 3, 1959
- Preceded by: Charles L. Gifford
- Succeeded by: Hastings Keith

Member of the Massachusetts Senate
- In office 1926 – 1947

Member of the Massachusetts House of Representatives
- In office 1925 – 1926

Personal details
- Born: August 11, 1888 Wareham, Massachusetts, U.S.
- Died: February 16, 1968 (aged 79) Wareham, Massachusetts, U.S.
- Party: Republican

Military service
- Branch/service: United States Army
- Battles/wars: World War I

Donald William Nicholson (August 11, 1888 – February 16, 1968) was an American politician from the state of Massachusetts.

== Early life ==
Born in Wareham, Massachusetts, Nicholson attended the public schools and took college extension courses. He first worked as a salesman before serving in the United States Army during World War I from 1917 to 1919. He served in the 236th Prisoner of War Escort Company Army Service Corps and rose to the rank of sergeant.

== Career ==
Returning to Massachusetts, he entered politics and served as selectman, assessor, and overseer of the poor in Wareham from 1920 to 1925. He served as a delegate to all Republican state conventions from 1924 to 1947; served in the Massachusetts House of Representatives in 1925 and 1926; as a member of the Massachusetts Senate from 1926 to 1947, and as president of the state senate in 1946 and 1947. He was elected as a Republican to the Eightieth Congress to fill the vacancy caused by the death of United States Representative Charles L. Gifford, and reelected to the five succeeding Congresses (November 18, 1947 – January 3, 1959). Nicholson voted in favor of the Civil Rights Act of 1957.

Nocholson did not seek reelection in 1958, though he likely could have won, even in this Democratic year. He said, “I’m fed up with by-passing of the Constitution, with ’modern Republicanism,’ with huge budgets, with federal interference in the states.” “Congress seems willing to surrender all its constitutional powers to the President and the government. I’ve had it.”

== Personal life ==
Nicholson retired to his home in Wareham, remaining there until his death on February 16, 1968; he is buried in Center Cemetery.

In 1964 a bridge in Wareham was named after Nicholson.

== See also ==
- Massachusetts legislature: 1925–1926, 1927–1928, 1929–1930, 1931–1932, 1933–1934, 1935–1936, 1937–1938, 1939, 1941–1942, 1943–1944, 1945–1946, 1947–1948

U.S. House of Representatives
| Preceded by Charles L. Gifford | Member of the U.S. House of Representatives from Massachusetts's 9th congressional district November 18, 1947 – January 3, 1959 | Succeeded by Hastings Keith |
