= Erland F. Fish =

American politician (1883–1942)

Erland F. Fish Hon.
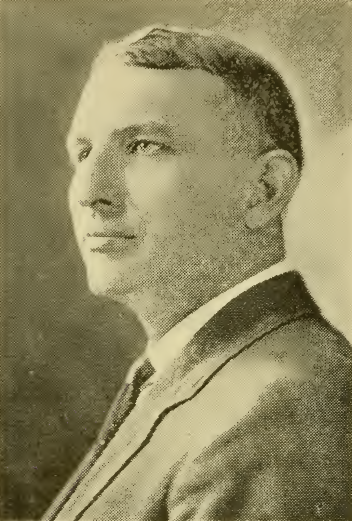

74th President of the Massachusetts Senate
- In office 1933–1934
- Preceded by: Gaspar G. Bacon
- Succeeded by: James G. Moran

Member of the Massachusetts Senate for the Norfolk & Suffolk District
- In office 1925–1937
- Preceded by: William S. Youngman
- Succeeded by: Sybil Holmes

Member of the Massachusetts House of Representatives Second Norfolk District

Personal details
- Born: December 7, 1883 Cambridge, Massachusetts, U.S.
- Died: February 18, 1942 (aged 58)
- Party: Republican
- Education: Harvard College; Harvard Law School (1908)
- Profession: Lawyer

Erland Frederick Fish (December 7, 1883 – February 18, 1942) was a Massachusetts lawyer and politician who served as President of the Massachusetts Senate from 1933 to 1934.

== Biography ==
Fish was born on December 7, 1883. Fish graduated from Harvard College and then Harvard Law School in 1908.

Starting in 1908, he clerked for a year for Justice Oliver Wendell Holmes Jr. at the U.S. Supreme Court. Afterwards, he worked for Gaston, Snow & Saltonstall, and later his family patent law firm, Fish, Richardson & Neave, in Boston.

In 1909, Fish joined the Massachusetts National Guard and served as captain in the 101st Field Artillery Regiment in France during World War I. From 1930 to 1934 he was the commanding general of the 26th Infantry Division, also known as the Yankee Division.

On February 18, 1942, Fish died at age 59 after he was hit by a taxicab driver in Boston.

== See also ==
- List of law clerks for the second seat of the Supreme Court of the United States
- Massachusetts legislature: 1920, 1921–1922, 1923–1924, 1925–1926, 1927–1928, 1929–1930, 1931–1932, 1933–1934, 1935–1936

Political offices
Preceded by Gaspar G. Bacon	President of the Massachusetts Senate; 1933–1934	Succeeded by James G. Moran
Military offices
Preceded by Alfred F. Foote	Commanding General 26th Infantry Division; 1930–1934	Succeeded by Daniel Needham
