= William F. Madden =

American politician (1897–1979)

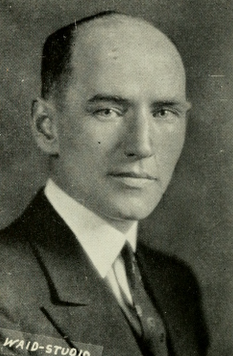
- Madden as a member of the Massachusetts Senate

Member of the Massachusetts Senate for the 5th Suffolk district
- In office 1933–1936
- Preceded by: Michael James Ward
- Succeeded by: James W. Hennigan Sr.

Member of the Massachusetts House of Representatives
- In office 1931–1932; 1925–1926

Personal details
- Born: January 4, 1897 Boston, Massachusetts, U.S.
- Died: September 18, 1979 (aged 82) Boston, Massachusetts, U.S.
- Party: Democratic

William Francis Madden (January 4, 1897 – September 18, 1979) was an American politician who was a member of the Massachusetts House of Representatives from 1925 to 1926 and 1931 to 1932 and the Massachusetts Senate from 1933 to 1936.

== Early life ==
Madden was born in Boston on January 4, 1897. He attended Boston Public Schools and graduated from the High School of Commerce. He played semi-professional baseball, was a veteran of World War I, and worked as a traffic manager.

== Politics ==
In 1924, Madden ran as a sticker candidate for the Massachusetts House of Representatives seat in the 15th Suffolk district following the death of William A. Canty. Although Canty received more votes, the Massachusetts Supreme Judicial Court ruled that Madden should be certified as the winner because "a dead man can not be elected to office". He did not run for reelection but returned to the House in 1931. In 1932, he was elected to represent the 5th Suffolk district in the Massachusetts Senate. In 1934, he helped stage filibusters that blocked the reelection of President of the Massachusetts Senate Erland F. Fish. Fish's successor, James G. Moran, chose Madden to chair the committee on metropolitan affairs. He was the first Democrat to chair this committee.

In 1935, Madden was charged with forging Civil Works Administration work and identification cards for three women so they could get jobs with a CWA project at the Boston Public Library. He was found guilty and sentenced to two months in the Plymouth House of Correction. His conviction was upheld by the United States Court of Appeals for the First Circuit and the United States Supreme Court declined to hear the case.

In 1936, Madden was the Democratic nominee for the United States House of Representatives seat in Massachusetts's 10th congressional district. He lost to Republican incumbent George H. Tinkham 60% to 31%.

In 1936, Madden was appointed director of the markets division of the Massachusetts Department of Agriculture by outgoing Governor James Michael Curley. He held this position until 1938, when Curley's successor, Charles F. Hurley, declined to reappoint him.

== Later life ==
Madden worked as a pharmacist and ran a pharmacy in Jamaica Plain. He died on September 18, 1979, at St. Elizabeth's Hospital in Brighton. He was buried in St. Joseph Cemetery in West Roxbury.
