= Emma E. Brigham =

American politician

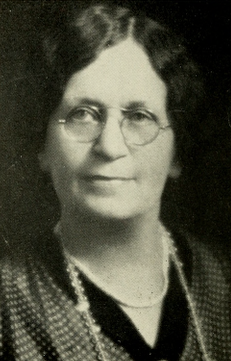

Member of the Massachusetts House of Representatives from the 6th Hampden district
- In office 1928–1936

Personal details
- Born: Emma Elizabeth Neal; June 10, 1872 Hartford, Vermont
- Died: July 17, 1973 (aged 101) Hackettstown, New Jersey

Emma Elizabeth Brigham (née Neal; June 10, 1872 – July 17, 1973) was an American politician.

== Personal life ==
Brigham was born on June 10, 1872, in Hartford, Vermont. She was a descendant of colonial Massachusetts Governors John Winthrop and Thomas Dudley.

She married Fred C. Brigham in 1900 and they had a daughter, Mrs. J. Kendall Joy. She died on July 17, 1973, in Hackettstown, New Jersey, and was survived by two sisters, Alleda T. Neal and Mrs. A.C. Pasini. Her funeral was held at Springfield's Hope Congregational Church and was buried in the city's Oak Grove Cemetery.

== Career ==
After passing the state exam to receive a teacher's certificate at the age of 13, Brigham taught in a rural Vermont school for two years. She then attended the Randolph Normal School before earning a nursing diploma from the Massachusetts General Hospital.

Brigham was the first woman on Springfield, Massachusetts' Common Council and the first woman to serve on its Board of Aldermen. She was inaugurated to the city council on January 1, 1923.

From 1928 to 1936, Brigham represented Springfield's Ward 4 in the Massachusetts House of Representatives as a Republican.
