= Francis E. Rafter =

American lawyer and politician (1892–1956)

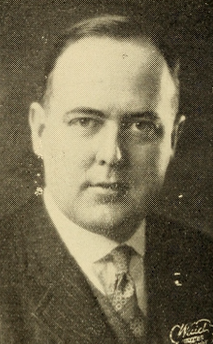
- Rafter as a member of the Massachusetts House of Representatives

Member of the Massachusetts House of Representatives
- In office 1925–1932
- Preceded by: George J. Bates
- Succeeded by: James F. Tobin
- Constituency: 18th Essex district (1925–1926); 14th Essex district (1927–1932)

Personal details
- Born: November 14, 1892 Salem, Massachusetts, U.S.
- Died: June 23, 1956 (aged 63) Salem, Massachusetts, U.S.
- Party: Democratic
- Education: Boston University School of Law
- Occupation: Lawyer; Politician

Francis Edward Rafter (November 14, 1892 – June 23, 1956) was an American attorney and politician who represented Jessie Costello during her murder trial and Daniel H. Coakley during his impeachment trial in the Massachusetts Senate. He was a member of the Massachusetts House of Representatives 1925 to 1932 and the Salem, Massachusetts city council from 1941 until his death in 1956.

== Early life ==
Rafter was born in Salem on November 14, 1892. His parents were Michael J. Rafter, a leather worker and native of Salem, and Ellen E. (Cronin) Rafter, a native of Beverly, Massachusetts. He graduated from Salem High School in 1911 and the Boston University School of Law in 1916.

Rafter served in the United States Navy during World War I. He enlisted in December 1917 and was assigned to the USS North Carolina. He was transferred to the USS New York after receiving a promotion to gunner. He made a number of transatlantic crossings to France and Italy. He was mustered out of the service in January 1919.

== Legal career ==
Rafter was admitted to the bar in 1916 and opened a law office in Salem. In 1933, he represented Jessie Costello, a Peabody, Massachusetts woman who was charged with the murder of her husband. Rafter took over as chief counsel before trial. Costello was acquitted after a highly publicized trial.

In 1938, he represented Frank E. Riley, director of the commercial motor vehicles division of the Massachusetts Public Utilities Commission, who was accused of accepting $2,300 from a trucking company owner. The commission found that the charges against Riley were not substatiated.

In 1941, Rafter and William H. Lewis served as defense counsel of Massachusetts Governor's Councilor Daniel H. Coakley during his impeachment trial. Coakley was accused of for using his position and influence to secure pardons in exchange for financial gain, most notably for mobster Raymond L. S. Patriarca. The Massachusetts Senate found Coakley guilty on 10 of the 14 articles on impeachment, voted 28 to 10 to remove him from office, and voted 23 to 15 to bar him for life from holding a place of "profit or honor or trust" in the Commonwealth.

== Political career ==
From 1925 to 1932, Rafter was a member of the Massachusetts House of Representatives. In 1941, he was elected to the Salem city council. He remained a member of the council until his death on June 23, 1956.
