= Albert F. Bigelow =

Massachusetts politician (1880–1958)

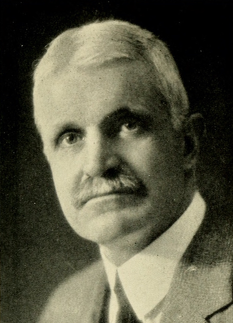

Member of the Massachusetts House of Representatives from the 10th Norfolk district
- In office 1927–1944

Personal details
- Born: October 4, 1880 Boston, Massachusetts
- Died: June 19, 1958 Belmont, Massachusetts
- Education: Harvard College (BA); Harvard Law School (LLB)

Albert F. Bigelow (October 4, 1880– June 19, 1958) was an American politician who was the member of the Massachusetts House of Representatives from the 10th Norfolk district.
