= 1944 Massachusetts elections =

1944 Massachusetts general election
- November 7, 1944

Part of the 1944 United States elections

The 1944 Massachusetts general election was held on November 7, 1944, throughout Massachusetts. Primary elections took place on July 11.

At the federal level, Republican Governor Leverett Saltonstall was elected to the United States Senate over Cambridge mayor John H. Corcoran in a special election to fill the vacancy caused by Henry Cabot Lodge Jr.'s resignation and Republicans won ten of fourteen seats in the United States House of Representatives.

In the race for Governor, Republican Lt. Governor Robert F. Bradford defeated incumbent Democrat Maurice Tobin. Overall, Republicans and Democrats evenly split the state-wide offices, with each party won three of the six elected offices. Republicans won both houses of the Massachusetts General Court

== Governor ==
Republican Incumbent Leverett Saltonstall ran for a seat in the United States Senate rather than seeking reelection. Democratic Mayor of Boston Maurice J. Tobin defeated Republican Lieutenant Governor Horace T. Cahill.

== Lieutenant governor ==
In the race for lieutenant governor, Middlesex County District Attorney Robert F. Bradford (R) defeated Democratic former attorney general Paul A. Dever.

=== Republican primary ===
Middlesex County District Attorney Robert F. Bradford defeated Senate President Jarvis Hunt, Speaker of the House Rudolph King, Beverly mayor Daniel E. McLean, and perennial candidate William McMasters for the Republican nomination.

Republican Lt. gubernatorial primary, 1944
Party	Candidate	Votes	%	±%
Republican	Robert F. Bradford	106,684	54.06%	
Republican	Jarvis Hunt	37,866	19.19%	
Republican	Rudolph King	33,860	17.16%	
Republican	Daniel E. McLean	12,780	6.47%	
Republican	William McMasters	6,142	3.11%	

=== Democratic primary ===
Somerville assessor John B. Carr defeated former Worcester mayor John S. Sullivan, former state representative Alexander F. Sullivan, and Everett city councilor Alfred P. Farese for the Democratic nomination. Although he was a relative unknown in statewide politics, Carr did have a similar name to his party's 1942 lieutenant gubernatorial nominee, John C. Carr.

Democratic Lt. gubernatorial primary, 1944
Party	Candidate	Votes	%	±%
Democratic	John B. Carr	61,222	33.38%	
Democratic	John S. Sullivan	55,140	30.07%	
Democratic	Alexander F. Sullivan	53,267	29.04%	
Democratic	Alfred P. Farese	13,754	7.50%	

=== General election ===
Massachusetts Lt. gubernatorial election, 1944
Party	Candidate	Votes	%	±%
Republican	Robert F. Bradford	975,537	51.65%	
Democratic	John B. Carr	893,487	47.30%	
Socialist Labor	George Leo McGlynn	11,159	0.59%	
Prohibition	Alfred Erickson	8,662	0.46%	

== Secretary of the Commonwealth ==
Twelve-term Republican Incumbent Frederic W. Cook ran unopposed in the primary and defeated Democrat Margaret O'Riordan in the general election for Secretary of the Commonwealth. John M. Bresnahan had defeated Margaret O'Riordan in the Democratic primary, but gave up the nomination to instead run for the United States House of Representatives seat in Massachusetts's 6th congressional district.

=== Democratic primary ===
Lynn school committee member John M. Bresnahan defeated Democratic National Committeewoman Margaret O'Riordan in the Democratic primary. Bresnahan also won the Democratic primary for the United States House of Representatives seat in Massachusetts's 6th congressional district. As he could not be the nominee in both races, Bresnahan relinquished his nomination for Secretary of the Commonwealth. O'Riordan was chosen by acclamation by the State Democratic Committee to replace Bresnahan on the ballot.

1944 Massachusetts Secretary of the Commonwealth Democratic Primary
Party	Candidate	Votes	%
Democratic	John M. Bresnahan	99,373	56.67%
Democratic	Margaret O'Riordan	75,973	43.32%
Write-in	All others	2	0.00%
Total votes		175,346	100.00%

=== General election ===
1944 Massachusetts Secretary of the Commonwealth Election
Party	Candidate	Votes	%	±%
Republican	Frederic W. Cook (incumbent)	1,072,267	59.31%	
Democratic	Margaret O'Riordan	782,664	40.36%	
Socialist Labor	Horace I. Hillis	13,764	0.94%	
Write-in	All others	4	0.00%	
Total votes		1,646,792	100.00%	

== Treasurer and Receiver-General ==
Incumbent Democratic Treasurer and Receiver-General Francis X. Hurley ran for Governor rather than seeking reelection. Democrat John E. Hurley defeated Republican Fred J. Burrell to succeed Hurley.

=== Republican primary ===
Former state treasurer Fred J. Burrell defeated former state senator Laurence Curtis for the Republican nomination.

1944 Massachusetts Treasurer and Receiver-General Republican Primary
Party	Candidate	Votes	%
Republican	Fred J. Burrell	92,236	50.17%
Republican	Laurence Curtis	91,578	49.82%
Write-in	All others	3	0.00%
Total votes		183,814	100.00%

=== Democratic primary ===
John E. Hurley, a former State Representative and secretary to Attorney General Paul A. Dever defeated attorney and Medfield assessor Francis C. McKenna, Democratic state committeeman Michael A. O'Leary, and state Auditor Thomas J. Buckley’s former confidential secretary John F. Welch to win the Democratic primary. Hurley was the fourth consecutive person in the past 14 years named Hurley to win the Democratic nomination for state treasurer, following Charles F. Hurley, William E. Hurley, and Francis X. Hurley.

1944 Massachusetts Treasurer and Receiver-General Democratic Primary
Party	Candidate	Votes	%
Democratic	John E. Hurley	118,955	66.30%
Democratic	Michael A. O’Leary	24,525	13.67%
Democratic	John F. Welch	20,040	11.17%
Democratic	Francis C. McKenna	15,886	8.85%
Write-in	All others	1	0.00%
Total votes		179,404	100.00%

=== General election ===
1944 Massachusetts Treasurer and Receiver-General Election
Party	Candidate	Votes	%	±%
Democratic	John E. Hurley	1,035,093	56.24%	
Republican	Fred J. Burrell	782,664	42.52%	
Socialist Labor	Herbert Crabtree	14,170	0.76%	
Prohibition	Earle L. Smith	8,310	0.45%	
Write-in	All others	35	0.00%	
Total votes		1,840,272	100.00%	

== Auditor ==
Incumbent Democratic Auditor Thomas J. Buckley ran unopposed in the Democratic primary and defeated Republican Frank A. Goodwin in the general election.

=== Republican primary ===
Registrar of Motor Vehicles Frank A. Goodwin defeated former Auditor Russell A. Wood and Young Republican Wallace E. Stearns in the Republican primary.

1944 Massachusetts Auditor Republican Primary
Party	Candidate	Votes	%
Republican	Frank A. Goodwin	108,036	56.82%
Republican	Russell A. Wood	65,028	34.20%
Republican	Wallace E. Stearns	17,049	8.96%
Write-in	All others	3	0.00%

=== General election ===
1944 Massachusetts Auditor Election
Party	Candidate	Votes	%	±%
Democratic	Thomas J. Buckley	972,910	52.17%	
Republican	Frank A. Goodwin	875,930	46.97%	
Socialist Labor	Gote Elvel Palmquist	10,368	0.55%	
Prohibition	Charles E. Vaughn	5,550	0.29%	
Write-in	All others	6	0.00%	
Total votes		1,864,764	100.00%	

== Attorney general ==
Incumbent Republican attorney general Robert T. Bushnell did not run for reelection and was not a candidate for any other office. Republican Clarence A. Barnes defeated Democratic former Lt. Governor Francis E. Kelly to succeed Bushnell.

=== Republican primary ===
Massachusetts Governor’s Councilor Clarence A. Barnes defeated attorneys Charles Fairhurst and James E. Farley in the Republican primary.

1944 Massachusetts Attorney General Republican Primary
Party	Candidate	Votes	%
Republican	Clarence A. Barnes	110,723	58.79%
Republican	James E. Farley	53,071	28.18%
Republican	Charles Fairhurst	24,502	13.01%
Write-in	All others	15	0.00%
Total votes		188,311	100.00%

=== Democratic primary ===
Former Lieutenant Governor Francis E. Kelly defeated former director of the state department of public works’ securities division John H. Backus, attorney Francis D. Harrigan, and World War II veteran Joseph M. McDonough in the Democratic primary.

1944 Massachusetts Attorney General Democratic Primary
Party	Candidate	Votes	%
Democratic	Francis E. Kelly	83,248	43.35%
Democratic	Joseph M. McDonough	53,392	27.80%
Democratic	Francis D. Harrigan	32,883	17.12%
Democratic	John H. Backus	22,454	11.69%
Write-in	All others	20	0.01%
Total votes		191,997	100.00%

=== General election ===
1944 Massachusetts Attorney General Election
Party	Candidate	Votes	%	±%
Republican	Clarence A. Barnes	929,320	49.86%	
Democratic	Francis E. Kelly	918,559	49.28%	
Socialist Labor	Fred E. Oelcher	10,439	0.56%	
Prohibition	Howard Rand	5,444	0.29%	
Write-in	All others	15	0.00%	
Total votes		1,863,777	100.00%	

== United States Senate ==
Governor Leverett Saltonstall (R) defeated Cambridge mayor John H. Corcoran (D) in a special election for the United States Senate seat previously held by Henry Cabot Lodge Jr., who had resigned from Massachusetts's other Senate seat in order to serve in World War II.

General election
Party	Candidate	Votes	%	±%
Republican	Leverett Saltonstall	1,228,754	64.29%	▲11.85
Democratic	John H. Corcoran	667,086	34.90%	▼11.71
Socialist Labor	Bernard G. Kelly	12,296	0.64%	▲0.29
Prohibition	E. Tallmadge Root	3,269	0.17%	▼0.09
Total votes		1,911,405	100.00%	

== United States House of Representatives ==
All of Massachusetts' fourteen seats in the United States House of Representatives were up for election in 1944.

Ten seats were won by Republican Party candidates.

Eleven seats were won by candidates seeking re-election. The 1st District seat (based in Western Massachusetts) was won by Republican John W. Heselton. Heselton defeated Democrat James P. McAndrews in a close race to succeed the retired Allen T. Treadway

== See also ==
- 154th Massachusetts General Court (1945–1946)
