= 1942 Massachusetts elections =

1942 Massachusetts general election
- November 3, 1942

Part of the 1942 United States elections

The 1942 Massachusetts general election was held on November 3, 1942, throughout Massachusetts. Primary elections took place on September 15.

At the federal level, Republican Incumbent Henry Cabot Lodge Jr. was reelected to the United States Senate over Democratic U.S. Representative Joseph E. Casey and Republicans won ten of fourteen seats in the United States House of Representatives.

In the race for Governor, Republican incumbent Leverett Saltonstall defeated Democrat Roger Putnam. Overall, Republicans won four of the six elected state-wide offices and both houses of the Massachusetts General Court.

== Governor ==
Republican Incumbent Leverett Saltonstall defeated Democratic Mayor of Springfield, Massachusetts Roger Putnam.

== Lieutenant governor ==
In the race for lieutenant governor, Republican incumbent Horace T. Cahill defeated Democratic Mayor of Medford John C. Carr. Both were unopposed in their parties’ primaries.

=== General election ===
Massachusetts Lt. gubernatorial election, 1942
Party	Candidate	Votes	%	±%
Republican	Horace T. Cahill (incumbent)	732,474	54.04%	
Democratic	John C. Carr	609,193	44.94%	
Socialist Labor	George L. McGlynn	8,293	0.61%	
Prohibition	E. Frank Searle	5,406	0.39%	

== Secretary of the Commonwealth ==
Eleven-term Republican Incumbent Frederic W. Cook ran unopposed in the primary and defeated Democrat Joseph J. Buckley in the general election for Secretary of the Commonwealth.

=== Democratic primary ===
Joseph J. Buckley, a former WPA employee and a virtual unknown in politics, defeated Leo A. Gosselin in the Democratic primary.

1942 Massachusetts Secretary of the Commonwealth Democratic Primary
Party	Candidate	Votes	%
Democratic	Joseph J. Buckley	136,678	85.64%
Democratic	Leo A. Gosselin	22,909	14.35%
Write-in	All others	1	0.00%
Total votes		159,558	100.00%

=== General election ===
1942 Massachusetts Secretary of the Commonwealth Election
Party	Candidate	Votes	%	±%
Republican	Frederic W. Cook (incumbent)	696,755	51.57%	
Democratic	Joseph J. Buckey	627,900	46.47%	
Socialist Labor	Bernard J. Kelly	16,347	1.21%	
Socialist	Peter Wartiainen Jr.	5,595	0.41%	
Prohibition	Abbie L. Tebbets	4,362	0.32%	
Write-in	All others	2	0.00%	
Total votes		1,350,961	100.00%	

== Treasurer and Receiver-General ==
Incumbent Republican Treasurer and Receiver-General William E. Hurley was constitutionally prevented from running for a fourth consecutive term. Democrat Francis X. Hurley defeated Republican Laurence Curtis to succeed Hurley.

=== Republican primary ===
State senator Laurence Curtis defeated former state senator Sybil Holmes, attorney Edgar A. French, Perennial candidate Wallace E. Stearns, and Boston finance commissioner Richard E. Johnston for the Republican nomination.

1942 Massachusetts Treasurer and Receiver-General Republican Primary
Party	Candidate	Votes	%
Republican	Laurence Curtis	89,100	47.90%
Republican	Sybil Holmes	40,140	21.57%
Republican	Edgar A. French	26,155	14.06%
Republican	Wallace E. Stearns	16,202	8.71%
Republican	Richard E. Johnston	14,406	7.74%
Write-in	All others	4	0.00%
Total votes		186,007	100.00%

=== Democratic primary ===
Attorney and former Massachusetts Auditor Francis X. Hurley defeated former state representative Thomas E. Barry, Boston City Councilor William F. Hurley, and state auditor Thomas J. Buckley’s former confidential secretary John F. Welch to win the Democratic primary. Francis X. Hurley was the third consecutive person in 12 years named Hurley to be elected state treasurer, following Charles F. Hurley and William E. Hurley.

1942 Massachusetts Treasurer and Receiver-General Democratic Primary
Party	Candidate	Votes	%
Democratic	Francis X. Hurley	106,703	48.23%
Democratic	Thomas E. Barry	53,659	24.25%
Democratic	William F. Hurley	40,063	18.11%
Democratic	John F. Welch	20,767	9.38%
Write-in	All others	4	0.00%
Total votes		221,196	100.00%

=== General election ===
1942 Massachusetts Treasurer and Receiver-General Election
Party	Candidate	Votes	%	±%
Democratic	Francis X. Hurley	669,223	49.82%	
Republican	Laurence Curtis	653,838	48.68%	
Socialist	Anders H. Swenson	7,377	0.54%	
Socialist Labor	Gote Elvel Palmquist	6,582	0.49%	
Prohibition	Martha E. Geer	6,061	0.45%	
Write-in	All others	1	0.00%	
Total votes		1,343,081	100.00%	

== Auditor ==
Incumbent Democratic Auditor Thomas J. Buckley defeated his predecessor, Republican Russell A. Wood in the general election.

=== Democratic primary ===
Incumbent Thomas J. Buckley defeated assistant director of Boston’s Bureau of Americanization Leo D. Walsh in the Democratic primary.

1942 Massachusetts Auditor Democratic Primary
Party	Candidate	Votes	%
Democratic	Thomas J. Buckley (incumbent)	162,302	73.01%
Democratic	Leo D. Walsh	59,993	26.98%
Write-in	All others	1	0.00%

=== General election ===
1942 Massachusetts Auditor Election
Party	Candidate	Votes	%	±%
Democratic	Thomas J. Buckley (incumbent)	684,317	51.43%	
Republican	Russell A. Wood	628,742	47.25%	
Socialist Labor	Herbert Crabtree	11,568	0.86%	
Prohibition	Ethel J. Prince	5,774	0.43%	
Write-in	All others	1	0.00%	
Total votes		1,864,764	100.00%	

== Attorney general ==
Incumbent attorney general Robert T. Bushnell (R) defeated former Boston city councilor and Massachusetts Fish and Game Commissioner James E. Agnew (D) to win reelection. Both won their parties’ nominations unopposed.

=== General election ===
1942 Massachusetts Attorney General Election
Party	Candidate	Votes	%	±%
Republican	Robert T. Bushnell (incumbent)	740,275	55.51%	
Democratic	James E. Agnew	575,301	43.13%	
Socialist Labor	Fred E. Oelcher	6,370	0.47%	
Prohibition	Charles F. Danforth	5,925	0.44%	
Socialist	Howard Penley	5,698	0.42%	
Write-in	All others	1	0.00%	
Total votes		1,333,570	100.00%	

== United States Senate ==
Republican Incumbent Senator Henry Cabot Lodge Jr. defeated Democratic U.S. Representative Joseph E. Casey to win his second term.

General election
Party	Candidate	Votes	%	±%
Republican	Henry Cabot Lodge Jr. (incumbent)	721,239	52.44	▲3.91
Democratic	Joseph E. Casey	641,042	46.61	▲5.62
Socialist	George Lyman Paine	4,802	0.35	▼0.19
Socialist Labor	Horace I. Hillis	4,781	0.35	▲0.35
Prohibition	George L. Thompson	3,577	0.26	▲0.26
Total votes		1,375,441	100.00%	

== United States House of Representatives ==
All of Massachusetts' fourteen seats in the United States House of Representatives were up for election in 1942. Republicans won 10 of the 14. Due to the loss of one congressional seat, the districts of Democrats, Thomas A. Flaherty and Thomas H. Eliot, were combined. Flaherty retired and Elliot lost renomination in the new Boston-based 11th congressional district to James Michael Curley. The Republicans gained a seat when Angier Goodwin won the seat previously held by Democrat Arthur Daniel Healey, who resigned when he was appointed to the United States District Court for the District of Massachusetts. Two other incumbents (Democrat Joseph E. Casey and Republican George H. Tinkham) also did not run for reelection and they were succeeded by members of their own party (Philip J. Philbin succeeded Casey in the Worcester County-based 3rd district and Christian Herter succeed Tinkham in the Boston-based 10th district).

== See also ==
- 153rd Massachusetts General Court (1943–1944)
