= 1946 Massachusetts elections =

1946 Massachusetts general election
- November 5, 1946

Part of the 1946 United States elections

The 1946 Massachusetts general election was held on November 5, 1946, throughout Massachusetts. Primary elections took place on June 18.

At the federal level, Republican Henry Cabot Lodge Jr. was elected to the United States Senate over incumbent Senator David I. Walsh, and Republicans won nine of fourteen seats in the United States House of Representatives. Future President of the United States John F. Kennedy was elected to his first term in the House.

In the race for Governor, Republican Lt. Governor Robert F. Bradford defeated incumbent Democrat Maurice Tobin. Overall, Republicans won five of the six elected state-wide offices. Only incumbent Democratic Auditor Thomas J. Buckley retained his office.

== Governor ==
Republican Lieutenant Governor Robert F. Bradford defeated incumbent Democratic Governor Maurice Tobin. Tobin survived a Democratic primary challenge from attorney Francis Harrigan, while Bradford was unopposed for the Republican nomination.

== Lieutenant governor ==
In the race for lieutenant governor, Republican State Senator Arthur W. Coolidge defeated Democratic former attorney general Paul A. Dever.

=== Republican primary ===
State Senator Arthur W. Coolidge defeated Lynn mayor Albert Cole in the Republican primary for Lieutenant Governor.

1946 Republican Lt. gubernatorial primary
Party	Candidate	Votes	%
Republican	Arthur W. Coolidge	124,804	66.39%
Republican	Albert Cole	63,072	33.61%
Total votes		187,876	100.00%

=== Democratic primary ===
Former Attorney General Paul A. Dever defeated Roger Putnam, Daniel J. O'Connell, and John B. Carr for the Democratic nomination for Lt. Governor.

1946 Democratic Lt. gubernatorial primary
Party	Candidate	Votes	%
Democratic	Paul A. Dever	135,991	52.01%
Democratic	Roger Putnam	87,868	33.60%
Democratic	Daniel J. O'Connell	19,669	7.52%
Democratic	John B. Carr	17,908	6.87%
Total votes		261,436	100.00%

=== General election ===
1946 Massachusetts Lt. gubernatorial election
Party	Candidate	Votes	%	±%
Republican	Arthur W. Coolidge	827,192	49.71%	
Democratic	Paul A. Dever	820,405	49.31%	
Socialist Labor	Francis A. Votano	10,708	0.64%	
Prohibition	Alfred Erickson	5,398	0.34%	
Total votes		1,663,703	100.00%	

== Secretary of the Commonwealth ==
Incumbent Republican Secretary of the Commonwealth Frederic W. Cook ran for re-election to a thirteenth two-year term in office.

The Democratic Party nominated Benedict F. Fitzgerald Jr.

The Socialist Labor Party nominated Malcolm T. Rowe.

=== Democratic primary ===
1946 Massachusetts Secretary of the Commonwealth Democratic Primary
Party	Candidate	Votes	%
Democratic	Benedict F. Fitzgerald Jr.	113,606	51.07%
Democratic	John J. Concannon	55,235	24.83%
Democratic	Paul H. Snow	31,320	14.08%
Democratic	Leo Moran	22,302	10.03%
Write-in	All others	2	0.00%
Total votes		222,465	100.00%

=== General election ===
1946 Massachusetts Secretary of the Commonwealth Election
Party	Candidate	Votes	%	±%
Republican	Frederic W. Cook (incumbent)	970,797	59.31%	
Democratic	Benedict F. Fitzgerald Jr.	660,602	40.36%	
Socialist Labor	Malcolm T. Rowe	15,392	0.94%	
Write-in	All others	1	0.00%	
Total votes		1,646,792	100.00%	

== Attorney general ==
Incumbent Republican attorney general Clarence A. Barnes ran for re-election to a second consecutive term. He defeated Democratic former Lt. Governor Francis E. Kelly in the general election.

=== Democratic primary ===
1946 Massachusetts Attorney General Democratic Primary
Party	Candidate	Votes	%
Democratic	Francis E. Kelly	103,684	41.78%
Democratic	Joseph M. McDonough	86,642	34.92%
Democratic	Michael F. Hourihan	25,610	10.32%
Democratic	Harry E. Casey	17,970	7.24%
Democratic	Edward A. Hutchinson	14,241	5.73%
Write-in	All others	3	0.00%
Total votes		248,150	100.00%

=== General election ===
1946 Massachusetts Attorney General Election
Party	Candidate	Votes	%	±%
Republican	Clarence A. Barnes (incumbent)	886,354	54.09%	
Democratic	Francis E. Kelly	733,420	44.76%	
Socialist Labor	William F. Oro	13,063	0.79%	
Prohibition	Howard B. Rand	5,766	0.35%	
Write-in	All others	6	0.00%	
Total votes		1,638,609	100.00%	

== Treasurer and Receiver-General ==
Incumbent Democratic Treasurer and Receiver-General John E. Hurley ran for re-election to a second term in office. He was defeated by Republican former State Senator Laurence Curtis.

The Prohibition Party nominated Charles H. Vaughn, and the Socialist Labor party nominated Lawrence Gilfedder.

=== Democratic primary ===
1946 Massachusetts Treasurer and Receiver-General Democratic Primary
Party	Candidate	Votes	%
Democratic	John E. Hurley (incumbent)	215,026	89.71%
Democratic	Thomas Khoury	24,664	10.29%
Write-in	All others	1	0.00%
Total votes		239,691	100.00%

=== Republican primary ===
1946 Massachusetts Treasurer and Receiver-General Republican Primary
Party	Candidate	Votes	%
Republican	Laurence Curtis	126,487	68.87%
Republican	Fred J. Burrell	57,168	31.13%
Write-in	All others	1	0.00%
Total votes		183,656	100.00%

=== General election ===
1946 Massachusetts Treasurer and Receiver-General Election
Party	Candidate	Votes	%	±%
Republican	Laurence Curtis	867,961	52.94%	
Democratic	John E. Hurley (incumbent)	753,890	45.89%	
Socialist Labor	Lawrence Gilfedder	12,767	0.78%	
Prohibition	Charles H. Vaughn	4,974	0.30%	
Write-in	All others	2	0.00%	
Total votes		1,639,594	100.00%	

== Auditor ==
Incumbent Democratic Auditor Thomas J. Buckley ran for re-election to a fourth term in office. He was re-elected narrowly over Republican Russell A. Wood.

The Prohibition Party nominated Robert A. Simmons, and the Socialist Labor Party nominated Pearl A. Votano.

=== Republican primary ===
==== Candidates ====
- Wallace E. Stearns, resident of the Back Bay and member of the Young Republicans
- Russell A. Wood, former Auditor and State Representative

==== Results ====
1946 Massachusetts Auditor Republican Primary
Party	Candidate	Votes	%
Republican	Russell A. Wood	123,197	71.11%
Republican	Wallace E. Stearns	50,035	28.89%
Write-in	All others	1	0.00%

=== General election ===
1946 Massachusetts Auditor General Election
Party	Candidate	Votes	%	±%
Democratic	Thomas J. Buckley (incumbent)	808,654	49.76%	
Republican	Russell A. Wood	796,980	49.04%	
Socialist Labor	Pearl A. Votano	14,491	0.89%	
Prohibition	Robert A. Simmons	5,041	0.31%	
Write-in	All others	1	0.00%	
Total votes		1,625,167	100.00%	

== United States Senate ==
Incumbent Democratic Senator David I. Walsh ran for re-election to a fourth term. He was defeated by former Senator Henry Cabot Lodge Jr., who had resigned from Massachusetts's other Senate seat in order to serve in World War II.

United States Senate election in Massachusetts, 1946
Party	Candidate	Votes	%	±%
Republican	Henry Cabot Lodge Jr.	989,736	59.55	▲17.17
Democratic	David I. Walsh (incumbent)	660,200	39.72	▼15.92
Socialist Labor	Henning A. Blomen	9,221	0.56	▲0.35
Prohibition	Mark R. Shaw	2,898	0.17	▼0.32
Total votes		1,662,055	100.00%	

== United States House of Representatives ==
All of Massachusetts' fourteen seats in the United States House of Representatives were up for election in 1946.

Nine seats were won by Republican Party candidates.

Twelve seats were won by candidates seeking re-election. The 4th District seat (based in Worcester) was won by Democrat Harold Donohue, defeating incumbent Republican Pehr Holmes. The 11th District seat (based in Boston and Cambridge) was won by John F. Kennedy after incumbent James Michael Curley vacated the seat to become Mayor of Boston.

== See also ==
- 155th Massachusetts General Court (1947–1948)
