= 1948 Massachusetts elections =

1948 Massachusetts general election
- November 2, 1948

Part of the 1948 United States elections

The 1948 Massachusetts general election was held on November 2, 1948, throughout Massachusetts. Primary elections took place on September 14.

Despite some Republican success at the federal level, the 1948 election was a historic victory for the Massachusetts Democratic Party. In the race for governor, Republican incumbent Robert F. Bradford lost re-election to former attorney general Paul Dever. Democrats swept the six statewide offices, defeating incumbents in five races, and took control of the Massachusetts House of Representatives for the first time since the American Civil War.

At the federal level, Harry Truman carried the state over Thomas Dewey in the presidential election, but Republican Leverett Saltonstall was re-elected to the United States Senate, and Republicans won eight of fourteen seats in the United States House of Representatives.

== Governor ==
Republican governor Robert F. Bradford was defeated by Democratic former attorney general Paul Dever in a landslide.

== Lieutenant governor ==
In the race for lieutenant governor, Democratic mayor of Worcester Charles F. Sullivan defeated incumbent Republican Arthur W. Coolidge.

=== Democratic primary ===
==== Candidates ====
===== Declared =====
- Charles F. "Jeff" Sullivan, Mayor of Worcester
- Benedict FitzGerald, attorney
- Edward P. Barry

==== Results ====
1948 Democratic Lt. gubernatorial primary
Party	Candidate	Votes	%
Democratic	Charles F. Sullivan	127,948	48.05%
Democratic	Benedict FitzGerald	99,712	37.44%
Democratic	Edward P. Barry	38,637	14.51%
Total votes		266,297	100.00%

=== General election ===
Massachusetts Lt. gubernatorial election, 1948
Party	Candidate	Votes	%	±%
Democratic	Charles F. Sullivan	1,163,041	56.69%	▲7.38
Republican	Arthur W. Coolidge (incumbent)	870,864	42.45%	▼6.86
Socialist Labor	Lawrence Gilfedder	12,127	0.59%	▼0.05
Prohibition	Guy S. Williams	5,457	0.27%	▼0.07
Total votes		2,051,489	100.00%	

== Secretary of the Commonwealth ==
Incumbent Republican Secretary of the Commonwealth Frederic W. Cook ran for re-election to a record fifteenth two-year term in office, but was narrowly defeated by Democrat Edward J. Cronin.

The Socialist Labor Party nominated Gote E. Palmquist.

=== Democratic primary ===
1948 Massachusetts Secretary of the Commonwealth Democratic Primary
Party	Candidate	Votes	%
Democratic	Edward J. Cronin	148,545	61.82%
Democratic	Jerome P. Troy	93,362	35.94%
Write-in	All others	2	0.00%
Total votes		241,909	100.00%

=== General election ===
1948 Massachusetts Secretary of the Commonwealth Election
Party	Candidate	Votes	%	±%
Democratic	Edward J. Cronin	1,011,397	49.98%	▲9.62
Republican	Frederic W. Cook (incumbent)	997,764	49.30%	▼10.01
Socialist Labor	Gote E. Palmquist	14,416	0.71%	▼0.23
Write-in	All others	1	0.00%	Steady
Total votes		2,023,578	100.00%	

== Attorney general ==
Incumbent Republican attorney general Clarence A. Barnes ran for re-election to a third consecutive term. He was defeated Democratic former lieutenant governor Francis E. Kelly in the general election. This was a re-match of the 1946 election.

=== Democratic primary ===
1948 Massachusetts Attorney General Democratic Primary
Party	Candidate	Votes	%
Democratic	Francis E. Kelly	98,370	35.94%
Democratic	Patrick Gilbert Sullivan	66,395	24.26%
Democratic	John F. Kelley	63,678	23.27%
Democratic	Enrico Cappucci	45,227	16.53%
Write-in	All others	5	0.00%
Total votes		273,675	100.00%

=== General election ===
1948 Massachusetts Attorney General Election
Party	Candidate	Votes	%	±%
Democratic	Francis E. Kelly	1,077,504	53.26%	▲8.50
Republican	Clarence A. Barnes (incumbent)	927,779	45.86%	▼8.23
Socialist Labor	Anthony Martin	17,649	0.87%	▲0.08
Write-in	All others	10	0.00%	Steady
Total votes		2,022,942	100.00%	

== Treasurer and Receiver-General ==
Incumbent Republican Treasurer and Receiver-General Laurence Curtis ran for re-election to a second term but was defeated by Democratic former Treasurer Francis E. Kelly. This was a re-match of the 1946 election.

The Prohibition Party nominated Harold J. Ireland, and the Socialist Labor party nominated Malcolm T. Rowe.

1948 Massachusetts Treasurer and Receiver-General Election
Party	Candidate	Votes	%	±%
Democratic	John E. Hurley	1,120,989	55.21%	▲9.32
Republican	Laurence Curtis (incumbent)	888,767	43.78%	▼9.16
Socialist Labor	Malcolm T. Rowe	13,087	0.64%	▼0.14
Prohibition	Harold J. Ireland	7,279	0.36%	▲0.06
Write-in	All others	4	0.00%	Steady
Total votes		2,030,126	100.00%	

== Auditor ==
Incumbent Democratic Auditor Thomas J. Buckley ran for re-election to a fifth term in office. He was re-elected in a landslide over Republican Russell A. Wood, who he had defeated in 1940, 1942, and 1946.

The Prohibition Party nominated Robert A. Simmons, and the Socialist Labor Party nominated Francis A. Votano.

=== Republican primary ===
1948 Massachusetts State Auditor Republican Primary
Party	Candidate	Votes	%
Republican	Russell A. Wood	91,768	40.18%
Republican	Edwin L. Olander	81,109	35.51%
Republican	Douglas Lawson	41,497	18.17%
Republican	Wallace E. Stearns	14,025	6.14%
Write-in	All others	0	0.00%
Total votes		228,399	100.00%

=== General election ===
1948 Massachusetts Auditor General Election
Party	Candidate	Votes	%	±%
Democratic	Thomas J. Buckley (incumbent)	1,241,653	61.58%	▲11.82
Republican	Russell A. Wood	752,430	37.32%	▼11.72
Socialist Labor	Francis A. Votano	12,510	0.62%	▼0.27
Prohibition	Robert A. Simmons	6,916	0.34%	▲0.03
Write-in	All others	5	0.00%	Steady
Total votes		2,016,214	100.00%	

== United States Senate ==
Incumbent Republican Senator Leverett Saltonstall ran for re-election to a full term in office. Saltonstall won the seat in the 1944 special election created by Henry Cabot Lodge Jr's resignation.

General election
Party	Candidate	Votes	%	±%
Republican	Leverett Saltonstall (incumbent)	1,088,475	52.95%	▼11.34
Democratic	John I. Fitzgerald	954,398	46.43%	▲11.53
Socialist Labor	Henning A. Blomen	9,266	0.44%	▼0.20
Prohibition	E. Tallmadge Root	3,652	0.18%	▲0.01
Total votes		2,055,791	100.00%	

== United States House of Representatives ==
All of Massachusetts' fourteen seats in the United States House of Representatives were up for election in 1948.

Eight seats were won by Republican Party incumbents, and six were won by Democratic candidates.

Thirteen seats were won by candidates seeking re-election. The 2nd District seat (based in Springfield) was won by Democrat Foster Furcolo over incumbent Republican Charles R. Clason.
