= Thomas E. Barry =

American politician (1899–1977)

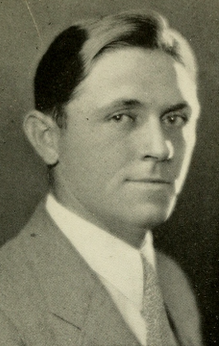
1935 Thomas Barry Massachusetts House of Representatives

Thomas Edmund Barry (May 14, 1899 – January 18, 1977) was an American politician who was a member of the Massachusetts House of Representatives from 1933 to 1939.

== Early life ==
Barry was born on May 14, 1899, in Boston. He served in the American Expeditionary Forces during World War I and was commander of East Boston's American Legion post. He graduated from Ithaca College in 1926 and Columbia University in 1927. Prior to holding elected office, Barry was a teacher and president of the Quincy Club of East Boston.

== Politics ==
Barry represented the Massachusetts House of Representatives' 1st Suffolk district from 1933 to 1939. During his first legislative session, Barry put forward a number of bills that would greatly increase public expenditure, which led to one newspaper nicknaming him "Million Dollar Barry". While in the House, Barry was a vocal critic of the Massachusetts Governor's Council and filed multiple bills to have the power to appoint Boston's police commissioner moved from the Governor of Massachusetts to the Mayor of Boston.

Barry was an candidate for the United States House of Representatives seat in Massachusetts's 11th congressional district in the 1937 special election following the resignation of John P. Higgins. He finished fourth in the Democratic primary behind Thomas A. Flaherty, John F. Cotter, Joseph A. Langone Jr., and Melvin B. Breath. In 1942, Barry finished second in the five candidate Democratic primary for Treasurer and Receiver-General of Massachusetts. He received 24% of the vote to Francis X. Hurley's 48%.

Barry served the United States Armed Forces during World War II and afterwards was the state commander of World War II Allied Veterans, Inc. In 1944, he helped secure a $300 bonus for WWII veterans.

== Personal life ==
Barry was married to the former Helene R. Collins. They had one daughter. In 1937, he was charged with negligent driving, driving the wrong way on a one-way street, failing to stop for an officer, and assault on a police officer. Barry died on January 18, 1977, at his home in Marblehead, Massachusetts.
