= Francis Hurley =

Francis Hurley may refer to:

- Francis Thomas Hurley (1927–2016), Roman Catholic archbishop of Anchorage
- Francis X. Hurley (1903–1976), American politician in Massachusetts
