= Owen A. Gallagher =

American politician (1902–1977)

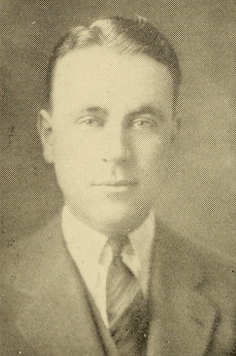

Member of the Massachusetts Senate from the 8th Suffolk District
- In office 1933–1935
- Preceded by: Max Clin
- Succeeded by: Thomas M. Burke

Member of the Massachusetts House of Representatives from the 17th Suffolk District
- In office 1927–1933

Personal details
- Born: May 24, 1902 Newton, Massachusetts
- Died: April 7, 1977 (aged 74) Boston
- Party: Democratic
- Spouse: Emily Couture
- Relations: Daniel J. Gallagher (father)
- Children: none
- Education: Boston College; Boston University School of Law
- Profession: Attorney

Owen Ambrose Gallagher (1902–1977) was an American politician who served in both chambers of the Massachusetts General Court and held positions in city and state government.

== Early life ==
Gallagher was born on May 24, 1902, in Newton, Massachusetts. His father, Daniel J. Gallagher, was a political and legal figure who served as United States Attorney for the District of Massachusetts from 1920 to 1921. Gallagher grew up in Dorchester and graduated from Boston College High School in 1919. He went on to attend Boston College, where he won the Fulton medal for oratory, was class president his senior year, and played third base for the Boston College Eagles baseball team. He graduated from B.C. in 1923 and the Boston University School of Law in 1926.

== Political career ==
Gallagher was a member of the Massachusetts House of Representatives from 1927 to 1933 and represented the 8th Suffolk District in the Massachusetts Senate from 1933 to 1935. In 1934 he was appointed chairman of the board of street commissioners by Boston mayor Frederick Mansfield. He resigned from this position on March 30, 1937, in order to run for district attorney of Suffolk County. He finished second in the Democratic primary behind incumbent William J. Foley.

In 1940, Gallagher ran for Lieutenant Governor of Massachusetts. He narrowly won the Democratic primary — defeating his closest opponent, John C. Carr, by 78 votes. He lost the general election to Horace T. Cahill 50.6% to 47.6%.

During World War II, Gallagher was a lieutenant commander in the United States Navy.

From 1946 to 1949, Gallagher was a member of the state racing commission. In 1950 he was named the director of the Boston Housing Authority's slum clearance and urban renewal program. The following year he was appointed to the authority's board of directors by Mayor John Hynes. He remained on the board until 1961, when Mayor John F. Collins chose not to reappoint him.

== Personal life ==
On April 19, 1951, Gallagher married Emily L. Couture, a switchboard operator at the Suffolk County Courthouse. Gallagher died on April 7, 1977, at the Long Island Hospital. He was predeceased by his wife.

Party political offices
Preceded by James M. Hurley	Democratic nominee for Treasurer and Receiver-General of Massachusetts; 1938	Succeeded by John J. Donahue
Preceded by James Henry Brennan	Democratic nominee for Lieutenant Governor of Massachusetts; 1940	Succeeded by John C. Carr
