= Sybil Holmes =

American politician

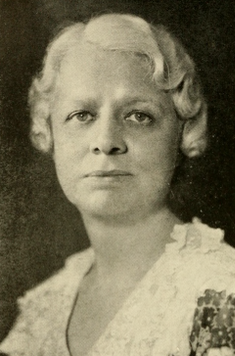

Member of the Massachusetts Senate from the Norfolk and Suffolk District
- In office 1937–1939
- Preceded by: Erland F. Fish
- Succeeded by: Edward Mullowney

Personal details
- Born: June 20, 1889 West Bridgewater, Massachusetts
- Died: July 22, 1979 (aged 90) Roxbury
- Party: Republican
- Occupation: Lawyer; Politician

Sybil Henry Holmes (June 20, 1889 – July 22, 1979) was an American politician who was the first woman elected to the Massachusetts Senate.

== Early life and legal career ==
Holmes was born on June 20, 1889, in West Bridgewater, Massachusetts, to Helen E. (Bangs) and Henry T. Holmes. Her father was a member of the Massachusetts House of Representatives from Chelsea, Massachusetts. She graduated from Bellingham High School in Chelsea and received legal training in the office of Francis P. Garland. Holmes was admitted to the Massachusetts bar in 1911. At the age of 21, she was the youngest woman to become a lawyer in the United States. She specialized in contracts, automobile insurance, industrial and accident, and probate law. During World War I, Holmes served on the Selective Service System's legal advisory board. In 1919, Holmes was elected president of the Massachusetts Association of Women Lawyers.

== Political career ==
Holmes began her political career as a town meeting member in Brookline, Massachusetts. She also served on the "Committee of Thirty", which reviewed appropriations and articles on the annual town meeting warrant. She was also an active member of the Massachusetts Republican Party and the Brookline Republican Town Committee. In 1923, Holmes was an unsuccessful candidate for the Brookline board of selectmen.

In 1922, Governor Channing H. Cox appointed Holmes to the state Commission on Unemployment and Minimum Wage. She also served on the Massachusetts Bay Colony Tercentenary Committee. From 1930 to 1934, she was an Assistant Attorney General. Holmes later became the first woman appointed as a master by the Massachusetts courts.

In 1936, Holmes was elected to the Massachusetts Senate. She was the first woman elected to the Massachusetts Senate. During her tenure in the Senate, Holmes served as chairperson of the legislative committee investigating subversive propaganda. On February 14, 1938, she became the first female to preside over the Senate when she presided over a brief afternoon session in the absence of President Samuel H. Wragg. Holmes was defeated for reelection in 1938 by Edward Mullowney.

In 1942, Holmes was a candidate for state treasurer. She finished a distant second place in the Republican primary to Laurence Curtis, but ahead of three other male candidates. She considered running for the United States Senate seat held by David I. Walsh, but instead supported Henry Cabot Lodge Jr.

From 1948 until 1959 (when she reached the mandatory retirement age of 70), Holmes was recorder of the Massachusetts Land Court.

In 1961, Holmes was a candidate for the Boston City Council. She finished tied for 19th in a 48 candidate preliminary election in which the top 18 candidates moved on.

== Personal life ==
Holmes never married. During her term in the Senate, she resided in Brookline with her sister and nephew. She later moved to Boston's Back Bay neighborhood. Holmes died on July 22, 1979, in Roxbury. She left no immediate survivors and at her request, no memorial service was held.

== See also ==
- 1937–1938 Massachusetts legislature
