= Thomas H. Buckley =

American politician (1897-1960)

Thomas Henry Buckley

Massachusetts Auditor
- In office 1935–1939
- Governor: James M. Curley; Charles F. Hurley
- Preceded by: Alonzo B. Cook
- Succeeded by: Russell A. Wood

First Deputy State Auditor
- In office 1933–1934

Town of Abington, Town Moderator
- In office 1926–1934

Personal details
- Born: September 5, 1897 Abington, Massachusetts
- Died: December 1, 1960 (aged 63)
- Party: Democratic
- Spouse: Helen Moriarty
- Education: Abington High School (1913)
- Profession: Accountant

Thomas Henry Buckley (September 5, 1897 – December 1, 1960) was an American politician who served as Massachusetts Auditor from 1935 to 1939.

Buckley's son, John R. Buckley, served as Secretary of Administration and Finance of Massachusetts and was member of the Massachusetts House of Representatives. He was not a relative of Thomas J. Buckley, who also served as Massachusetts Auditor (1941–1964).

== Bibliography ==
- Curtis, Georgina Pell.: The American Catholic Who's Who, page 40, (1943).
- Clark, William Horace.: The Story of Massachusetts, page 110, (1938).
- Howard, Richard T.: Public officials of Massachusetts, page 25, (1935).

Party political offices
Preceded by Francis X. Hurley	Democratic nominee for Auditor of Massachusetts; 1934, 1936, 1938	Succeeded by Thomas J. Buckley
Political offices
Preceded by Alonzo B. Cook	Massachusetts Auditor; 1935 – 1941	Succeeded by Thomas J. Buckley
Preceded by First	Commissioner of Administration and Finance; 1948 – 1953	Succeeded by Carl A. Sheridan
