= Vahey =

Vahey is a surname. Notable people with this surname include:

- Cristin McCarthy Vahey, American politician
- James H. Vahey (1871–1929), American lawyer and politician
- James H. Vahey Jr. (1900–1949), American lawyer and political figure
- John Haslette Vahey (1881–1938), Northern Irish author of detective fiction
- Robert Vahey (1932–2013), British actor
- William Vahey (1949–2014), American schoolteacher and child molester
