= 1936 United States Senate election in Massachusetts =

- November 3, 1936
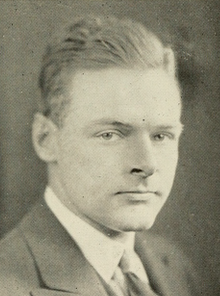

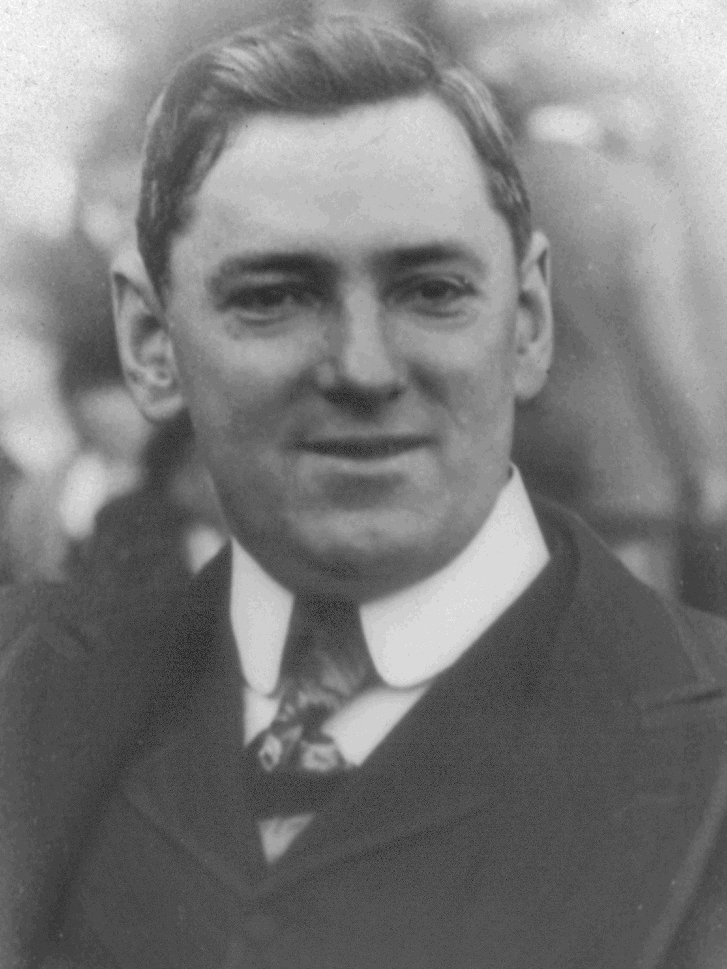

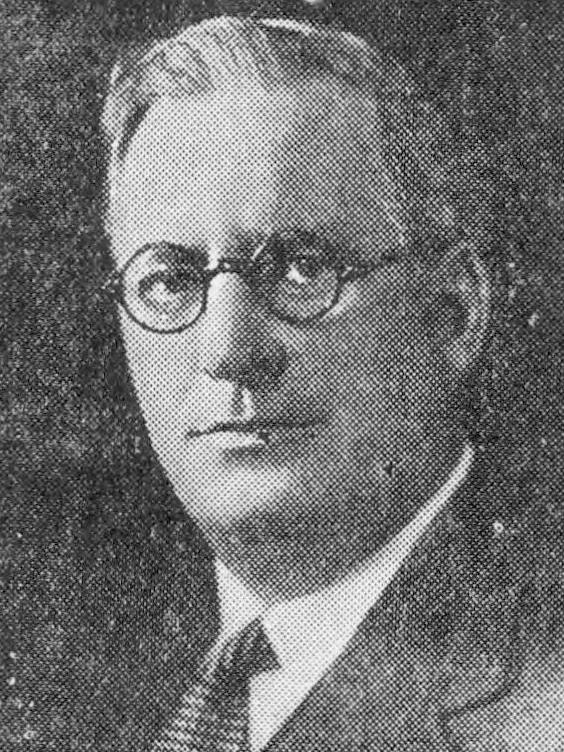
Nominee	Henry Cabot Lodge Jr.	James Michael Curley	Thomas C. O'Brien
Party	Republican	Democratic	Union
Popular vote	875,160	739,751	134,245
Percentage	48.53%	41.02%	7.44%
- Lodge: 40–50% 50–60% 60–70% 70–80% 80–90% >90% Curley: 40–50% 50–60% 60–70% 70–80%
U.S. senator before election
Marcus A. Coolidge
Democratic
Elected U.S. Senator
Henry Cabot Lodge Jr.
Republican

The 1936 United States Senate election in Massachusetts was held on November 3. Incumbent Democratic Senator Marcus A. Coolidge declined to stand for re-election. Republican Henry Cabot Lodge Jr. won the race to succeed him over Democratic Boston mayor James Michael Curley and former Suffolk County prosecutor Thomas C. O'Brien.

The election was notable because although Democrats expanded their overall Senate majority to 74 seats, Massachusetts was the only seat gained by Republicans. Curley's campaign may have been damaged by President Roosevelt's decision to remain aloof and the candidacy of O'Brien, who siphoned many usually Democratic Irish-American votes in Boston.

== Republican primary ==
=== Candidates ===
- Alonzo B. Cook, former Massachusetts Auditor
- Guy M. Gray, State Representative
- Henry Cabot Lodge Jr., State Representative and grandson of former Senator Henry Cabot Lodge
- Thomas C. O'Brien, former Suffolk County District Attorney (also running as Democrat)

==== Withdrew ====
- James T. Cavanaugh, former State Senator from Boston (after loss at convention)
- Sinclair Weeks, former Mayor of Newton and son of former Senator John W. Weeks (after loss at convention)

=== Convention ===
At the Springfield convention, held June 18–21, the fight between Lodge and Weeks came to a head. Observers considered the race the closest of any in the state and both candidates claimed a substantial lead in delegates. James Cavanaugh, by then a decided third, declared that he would not throw his delegates to Weeks in the event of a second ballot, but did not say he would throw them to Lodge.

Weeks received a major boost on the third day, when his candidacy was backed by Joseph W. Martin and John W. Haigis, the candidate for Governor.

The voting itself was not decided until the final state senate district, the Worcester and Hampden district, declared its vote. Although it was a Weeks district, Lodge needed only six of its votes, which he secured about halfway through the roll call.

1936 Republican convention
Party	Candidate	Votes	%
Republican	Henry Cabot Lodge Jr.	336	52.42%
Republican	Sinclair Weeks	299	46.65%
Republican	J. T. Cavanaugh	6	0.94%
Total votes		641	100.00

After the voting concluded, Weeks took the podium to make the endorsement unanimous and give his personal support to Lodge.

=== Primary results ===
1936 Republican U.S. Senate primary
Party	Candidate	Votes	%
Republican	Henry Cabot Lodge Jr.	356,756	83.99%
Republican	Alonzo B. Cook	42,261	9.95%
Republican	Guy M. Gray	18,076	4.26%
Republican	Thomas C. O'Brien	6,834	1.61%
Write-in		821	0.19%
Total votes		424,748	100.00

All three losing candidates entered the general election as the nominees of third parties. Cook ran on an "Economy" ticket, Gray ran on the Social Justice ticket, and O'Brien ran on the national Union Party ticket.

== Democratic primary ==
=== Candidates ===
- James Michael Curley, Governor of Massachusetts and former Mayor of Boston and U.S. Representative
- Robert E. Greenwood, Mayor of Fitchburg
- Thomas C. O'Brien, former Suffolk County District Attorney (also running as Republican)

==== Declined ====
- Marcus A. Coolidge, incumbent Senator

=== Results ===
The Democratic nominee was Governor and former (and future) Mayor of Boston James Michael Curley. President Franklin Roosevelt declined to endorse Curley, which may have affected the final results.

1936 Democratic U.S. Senate primary
Party	Candidate	Votes	%
Democratic	James Michael Curley	245,606	62.97%
Democratic	Robert E. Greenwood	104,615	26.81%
Democratic	Thomas C. O'Brien	39,035	10.01%
Write-in		806	0.21%
Total votes		390,062	100.00

== General election ==
=== Candidates ===
- Alonzo B. Cook, former Massachusetts Auditor (Economy)
- Albert Sprague Coolidge (Socialist)
- James Michael Curley, Governor of Massachusetts and former mayor of Boston and U.S. Representative (Democratic)
- Ernest L. Dodge (Socialist Labor)
- Charles Flaherty (Communist)
- Guy M. Gray, State Representative (Social Justice)
- Moses H. Gulesian (Townsend)
- Henry Cabot Lodge Jr., State Representative from Beverly, journalist, and grandson of former Senator Henry Cabot Lodge (Republican)
- Wilbur D. Moon (Prohibition)
- Thomas C. O'Brien, Suffolk County District Attorney (Union)

=== Campaign ===
Lodge was highly critical of Curley's tenure as Governor, but did not mention him by name. Curley resorted to personal attacks, referring to Lodge, who was only 34 years old, as "Little Boy Blue" and "a young man who parts both his hair and his name in the middle." He accused Lodge of being a reactionary in the supposed mold of his grandfather, Henry Cabot Lodge. Lodge criticized Curley for his failure to achieve federal funding for Massachusetts during the Great Depression, which may have been the result of Curley's personal feud with President Roosevelt. He defended his own record as supportive of labor and economic intervention and his grandfather's as protective of the laboring classes via restriction on immigration and opposition to international adventurism.

O'Brien, who ran at the urging of Charles Coughlin, campaigned for the urban Irish Catholic vote. His campaign was spurred by Curley's efforts to align with President Roosevelt, from whom Coughlin had broken earlier in his term.

Roosevelt made a personal swing through the state as part of his re-election campaign, but when Curley tried to get a photograph with Roosevelt, he made a point of turning away.

Later in the race, Curley tried to have Lodge's name removed from the ballot by arguing, through his political ally and Lodge's primary opponent Alonzo B. Cook, that "Jr." was reserved for the son of a man with the same name, and Lodge was instead the grandson. This controversy was quashed when Lodge produced a birth certificate reading "Jr." In fact, Curley's own legal name did not include "Michael", but he was listed on the ballot as "James Michael Curley" nonetheless. The Lodge campaign did not challenge this discrepancy.

=== Results ===
General election
Party	Candidate	Votes	%	±%
Republican	Henry Cabot Lodge Jr.	875,160	48.53%	▲3.86
Democratic	James Michael Curley	739,751	41.02%	▼12.99
Union	Thomas C. O'Brien	134,245	7.44%	N/A
Economy	Alonzo B. Cook	11,519	0.64%	N/A
Social Justice	Guy M. Gray	9,906	0.55%	N/A
Socialist	Albert Sprague Coolidge	9,763	0.54%	▼0.06
Townsend	Moses H. Gulesian	7,408	0.41%	N/A
Socialist Labor	Ernest L. Dodge	7,091	0.39%	▲0.01
Communist	Charles Flaherty	4,821	0.27%	▼0.06
Prohibition	Wilbur D. Moon	3,677	0.20%	N/A
Write-in		16	0.00%	
Total votes		1,803,357	100.00%	

== See also ==
- United States Senate elections, 1936 and 1937
