= 1944 United States Senate special election in Massachusetts =

- November 7, 1944
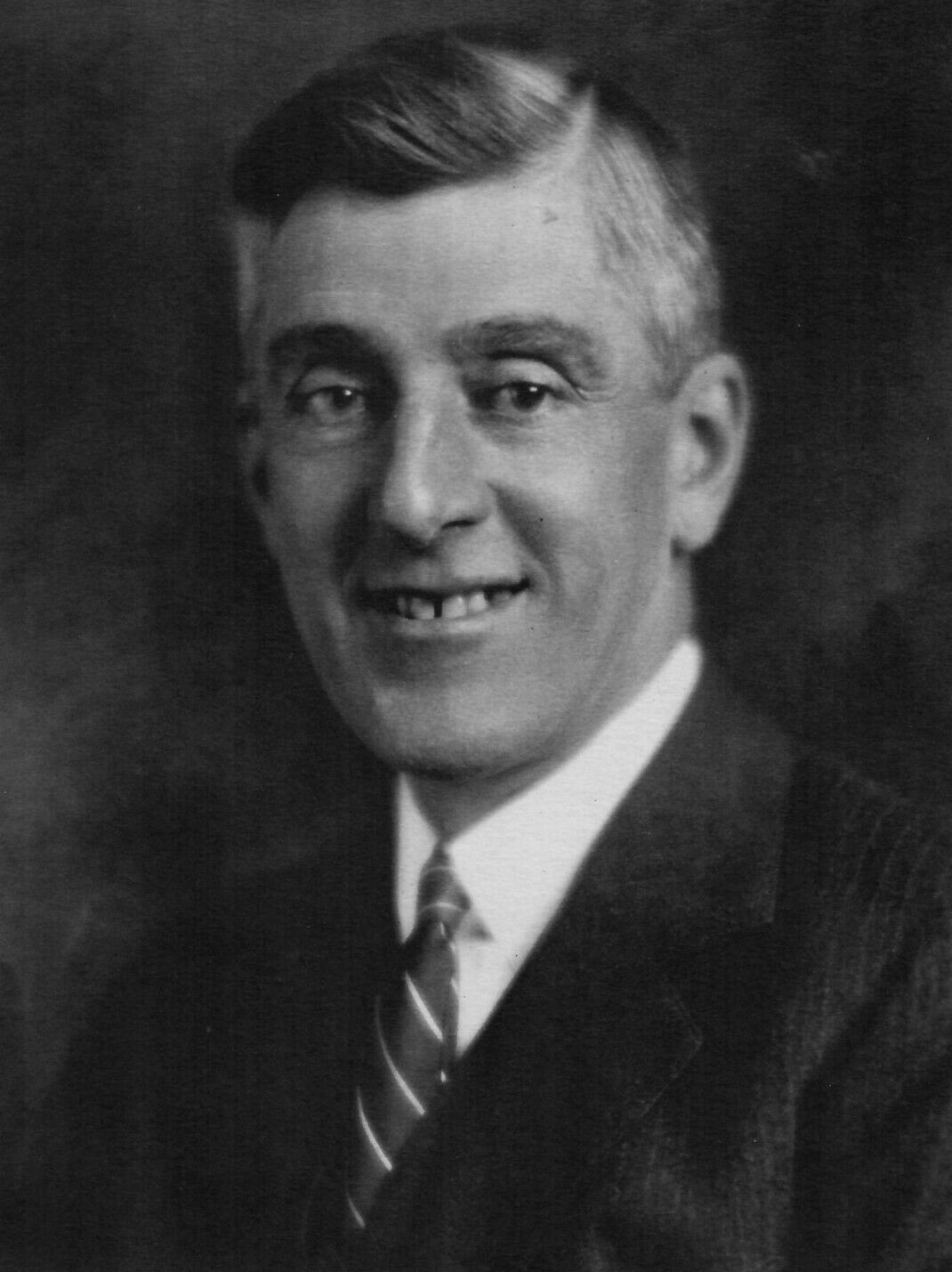

Nominee	Leverett Saltonstall	John H. Corcoran
Party	Republican	Democratic
Popular vote	1,228,754	667,086
Percentage	64.29%	34.90%
- Saltonstall: 40–50% 50–60% 60–70% 70–80% 80–90% >90% Corcoran: 50–60% 60–70% 70–80%
U.S. senator before election
Sinclair Weeks
Republican
Elected U.S. Senator
Leverett Saltonstall
Republican

The 1944 United States Senate special election in Massachusetts was held on November 7, 1944 to complete the unexpired term of Henry Cabot Lodge Jr., who had resigned from the Senate to serve in World War II. Republican governor Leverett Saltonstall defeated Cambridge mayor John H. Corcoran in a landslide.

Primary elections were held on July 10. Saltonstall was unopposed for the Republican nomination, while Corcoran won a highly competitive race for the Democratic nomination in which all four candidates came from Boston or Cambridge.

At the time, Saltonstall's margin of victory was the largest ever recorded by a candidate for statewide office in Massachusetts.

== Background ==
Henry Cabot Lodge Jr. resigned from the Senate on February 3, 1944, to return to active duty in the U.S. Army during World War II.

Despite initial reporting that Leverett Saltonstall would resign as governor so that lieutenant governor Horace T. Cahill could succeed him and appoint him to the vacant seat, Saltonstall opted not to resign. Instead, on February 8, Saltonstall appointed Sinclair Weeks, whom Lodge had narrowly defeated for the Senate nomination at the Republican state convention in 1936.

A special election was scheduled on November 7, concurrent with the regularly scheduled 1944 elections.

== Republican primary ==
=== Candidates ===
- Leverett Saltonstall, governor of Massachusetts since 1939

==== Declined ====
- Sinclair Weeks, interim U.S. senator since February 3

=== Results ===
Governor Saltonstall was unopposed for the Republican nomination.

== Democratic primary ==
=== Candidates ===
- John H. Corcoran, mayor of Cambridge
- Joseph A. Langone Jr., former state senator
- Joseph Lee, former member of the Boston School Committee
- Richard M. Russell, former U.S. representative and mayor of Cambridge

=== Results ===
Democratic primary
Party	Candidate	Votes	%
Democratic	John H. Corcoran	62,537	33.90%
Democratic	Joseph Lee	47,514	25.76%
Democratic	Richard M. Russell	47,080	25.52%
Democratic	Joseph A. Langone Jr.	27,317	14.82%
Total votes		184,448	100.00%

== General election ==
=== Candidates ===
- John H. Corcoran, mayor of Cambridge since 1942 (Democratic)
- Bernard G. Kelly, nominee for Secretary of the Commonwealth in 1942 and Auditor in 1940 (Socialist Labor)
- E. Tallmadge Root, nominee for Governor of Massachusetts in 1940 (Prohibition)
- Leverett Saltonstall, Governor of Massachusetts since 1939 (Republican)

=== Results ===
General election
Party	Candidate	Votes	%	±%
Republican	Leverett Saltonstall	1,228,754	64.29%	▲11.85
Democratic	John H. Corcoran	667,086	34.90%	▼11.71
Socialist Labor	Bernard G. Kelly	12,296	0.64%	▲0.29
Prohibition	E. Tallmadge Root	3,269	0.17%	▼0.09
Total votes		1,911,405	100.00%	

Though he was entitled to be seated immediately upon the certification of the election, Saltonstall did not take office until January 4, 1945, when his term as Governor ended.

== See also ==
- United States Senate elections, 1944
