= John E. White =

American politician

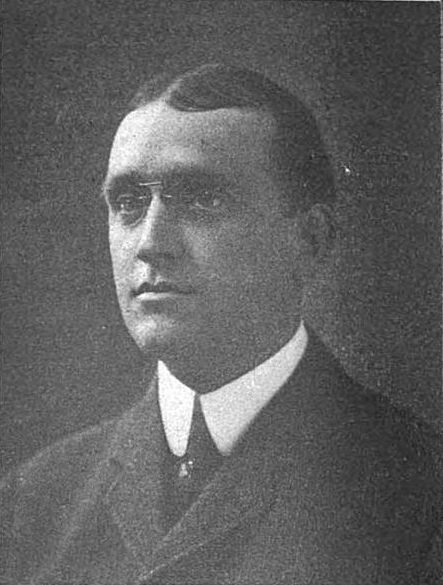

Massachusetts Auditor
- In office July 6, 1911 – 1914
- Governor: Eugene Noble Foss
- Preceded by: Henry E. Turner
- Succeeded by: Frank H. Pope

Member of the Massachusetts State Senate
- In office 1910–1911

Member of the Massachusetts House of Representatives First Dukes District
- In office 1905–1905

Chairman of the Board of Selectmen and Assessors of Edgartown, Massachusetts
- In office 1904–1904

Member of the Board of Selectmen and Assessors of Edgartown, Massachusetts
- In office 1903–1904

Member of the Board of Selectmen and Assessors of Edgartown, Massachusetts
- In office 1899–1901

Personal details
- Born: December 13, 1873 Lawrence, Massachusetts
- Died: September 22, 1943 (aged 69)
- Party: Republican
- Profession: Banker

John E. White (December 13, 1873 – September 22, 1943) was an American banker and politician who served as the Massachusetts Auditor.

== Biography ==
White was born in Lawrence, Massachusetts on December 13, 1873. White received his education in the Lawrence public schools.

In 1905 White was a member of the Massachusetts House of Representatives, White served on the House Committee on Ways and Means.

On July 6, 1911 White was elected by the legislature to fill the vacancy in the Auditor's position, he was elected to a full term in the 1911 state election.

He died on September 22, 1943.

Party political offices
| Preceded by Henry E. Turner | Republican nominee for Auditor of Massachusetts; 1911, 1912, 1913 | Succeeded by Alonzo B. Cook |
Political offices
| Preceded by Henry E. Turner | Massachusetts Auditor; 1911– 1914 | Succeeded by Frank H. Pope |
