= Raceland (estate) =

Estate in Framingham, Massachusetts

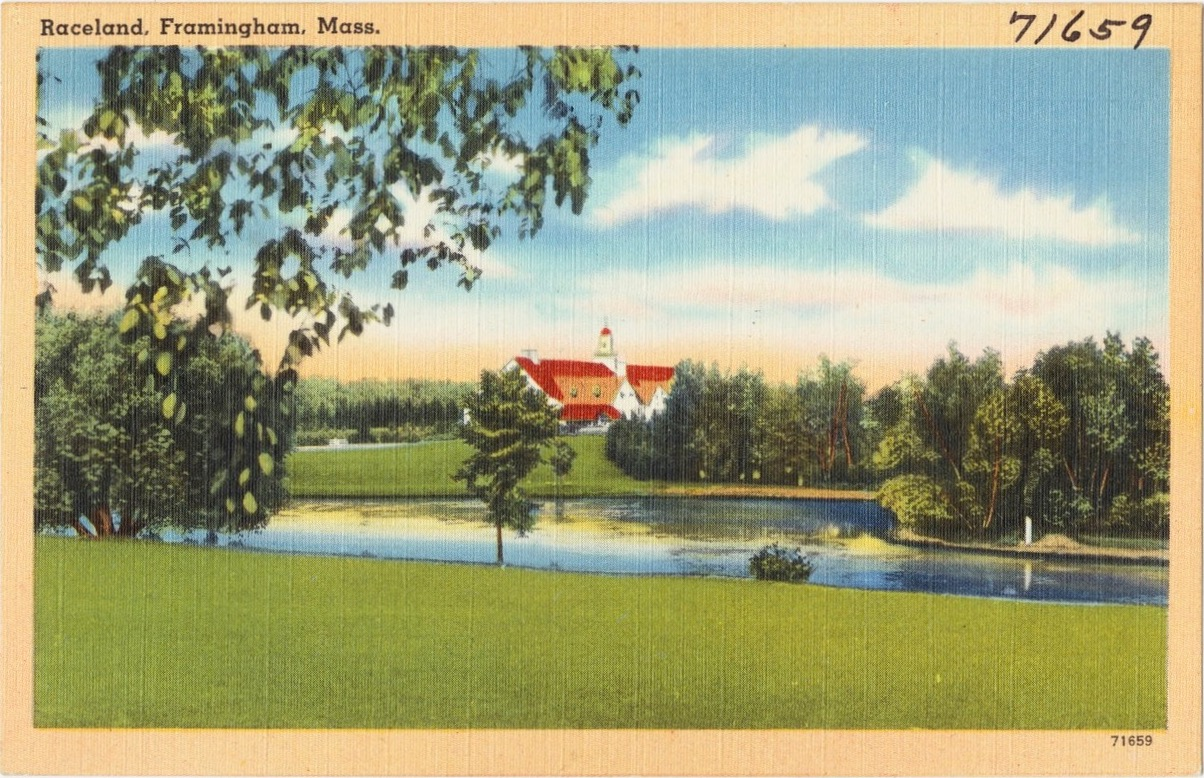
- A postcard of Raceland, c. 1930–1945
- Interactive map of Raceland
- Location: Framingham, Massachusetts, United States
- Coordinates: 42.2897°N 71.4567°W
- Owned by: John R. Macomber
- Date opened: June 1927
- Date closed: 1935
- Race type: Thoroughbred
- Course type: Flat, jump

Raceland was a 220-acre (89 ha) estate in Framingham, Massachusetts, owned by John R. Macomber. The estate contained Macomber's residence, stables, dog kennels, as well as a horse track, steeplechase course, and golf course.

== Original building ==
Raceland was built in 1925. It was designed by the firm of Parker, Thomas & Rice. The original structure was a 150-foot-long (46 m) wooden frame building with a slate roof. Macomber's residence was located on one end of the building and the stable was located at the other. There was also a one-half-mile (0.80 km) flat track, a seven-eighths-mile (1.4 km) steeplechase course, and an enclosed area for spectators.

Racing began in June 1927, and Macomber opened Raceland to the public free of charge for one day of the annual horse meet. By 1930, the meet attracted 29,200 spectators. On August 1, 1930, a fire that started in the hayloft resulted in $200,000 worth of damage as well as the death of Macomber's favorite dog. The only thing left of the buildings were the foundations.

== Second structure ==
During the winter of 1930–31, work was begun to rebuild Raceland. The stables and club house were built with the same plans, but instead used brick, stile, steel, and concrete to make the structure more fire resistant. The club house was also enlarged. The steeple of Macomber's home was topped by a weather vane depicting his most famous horse, Petee-Wrack, a half-brother of Triple Crown winner Gallant Fox.

== Later years ==
Thoroughbred racing continued at Raceland until 1935, when Suffolk Downs opened. Raceland continued to host a number of other events including the Framingham District Kennel Club Dog Show—New England's largest outdoor dog show. In 1939, it was the site of the first meeting of the Vintage Motor Car Club of America.

Macomber died on May 11, 1955, at the age of 80. His will provided for the contiunace of Raceland to care for his horses and dogs for the rest of their lives. Never married, he left much of his estate to the Massachusetts Society for the Prevention of Cruelty to Animals (MSPCA).

Scenes for the 1959 film The Man in the Net were filmed at Raceland. From 1959 to 1967, it was the site of the Millwood Hunt Club horse show. In 1971, 57 acres (23 ha) of the estate were acquired by the town of Framingham for conservation purposes. Known as the Macomber Reservation, a hiking trail is open to the public.

In 1981, the MSPCA reopened Raceland as the Macomber Farm, a working farm and educational facility. The farm closed in 1986 and was purchased by a developer who constructed single-family homes on the property.
