= Henry Gardner Sr. =

American politician (1731–1782)

Henry Gardner, Sr.

1st Massachusetts Treasurer
- In office 1780–1782
- Preceded by: None
- Succeeded by: Thomas Ivers

Personal details
- Born: Henry Gardner; 1731
- Died: October 7, 1782 (aged 50–51) Dorchester, Massachusetts
- Spouse: Hannah Clap
- Children: Henry Gardner; Joseph Gardner
- Education: Harvard College

Henry Gardner Sr. (1731-October 7, 1782) was an American politician who served as Treasurer of the Commonwealth of Massachusetts and the Colony of Massachusetts Bay. He was appointed receiver general and treasurer in 1774 by the Provisional Congress of Massachusetts.

Gardner lived in Stow, Massachusetts and moved to Dorchester, Massachusetts in 1778, the year he married Dorchester native Hannah Clap. The couple had two children.

== State treasurer ==
Gardner was appointed treasurer of the Massachusetts Bay Colony by the Massachusetts Provincial Congress in 1774, and was appointed the first treasurer and receiver general of the State of Massachusetts in 1780 upon adoption of the new state constitution. He served in that post until his death on October 7, 1782. Gardner's grandson, also named Henry Gardner, served as Governor of Massachusetts in the 1850s.

Political offices
| First | Massachusetts Treasurer; 1780–1782 | Succeeded by Thomas Ivers |
