= Massachusetts Alcoholic Beverage Control Commission =

Agency of the U.S. state of Massachusetts

The Alcoholic Beverages Control Commission (ABCC) is a Massachusetts state government agency responsible for licensing or permitting participants in the alcoholic beverages industry in Massachusetts. Structured under the Massachusetts State Treasury, the Commission licenses manufacturers of alcoholic beverages, wholesalers and importers and out-of-state suppliers of alcoholic beverages. Additionally, brokers, salesman, warehouses, planes, trains, ships, ship chandlers, and motor vehicles transporting alcoholic beverages in Massachusetts require licensing. The Commission also approves the granting of every retail pouring or package store license application allowed by a city or town.
