= John R. Macomber =

American financier and sportsman (1875-1955)

- Born: February 1, 1875; Framingham, Massachusetts, U.S.
- Died: May 11, 1955 (aged 80); Framingham, Massachusetts, U.S.
- Education: Massachusetts Institute of Technology
- Occupation: Financier
- Known for: Involvement in Thoroughbred racing; Raceland estate

John Russell Macomber (February 1, 1875 – May 11, 1955) was an American financier and sportsman.

== Early life ==
Macomber was born on February 1, 1875, in Framingham, Massachusetts, to John F. and Helen A. Hunt Macomber. He attended public schools in Framingham and the Chauncey Hill School in Boston. In 1897, he graduated from the Massachusetts Institute of Technology.

== Business career ==
In 1894, Macomber joined the banking firm of N. W. Harris & Co as a messenger. In 1909, he became a partner, and he was named vice president in 1911. In 1916, the firm was succeeded by Harris, Forbes & Co. and Macomber was made president. In 1930, he became chairman of the board of directors. In 1931, the business was consolidated with Chase Securities to become Chase, Harris, Forbes Corporation. In 1934, Chase, Harris, Forbes dissolved its banking affiliates and Macomber became chairman of the First Boston Corporation. He retired from the board on December 31, 1947.

Macomber also served as a director or trustee of a number of companies, including First National Bank of Boston, Harris Trust and Savings Bank, Bankers Trust, the International Paper Company, Chase National Bank, United Shoe Machinery Corporation, and Puget Sound Power and Light. In 1927, Macomber was named chairman of the board of directors for the planned sports arena at North Station which became the Boston Garden. The board, which consisted of members of the Madison Square Garden Corporation, the Boston and Maine Corporation, and a number of Boston businessmen, also included Tex Rickard, Homer Loring, George Hannauer, Edward Lawrence Logan, Louis K. Liggett, Charles F. Adams, Huntington Hardwick, and Joseph Gilman. In 1934, the Madison Square Garden Corporation sold its interest to the Boston Arena Corporation and Macomber served on the Board of the new Boston Garden-Arena Corporation.

== Public service ==
During World War I, Macomber served as chairman of the New England Liberty Loan committee and of Metropolitan Boston trade in the United War Work campaign. From 1919 to 1920, Macomber served as President of the Boston Chamber of Commerce. On September 3, 1920, Massachusetts State Treasurer Fred J. Burrell resigned following an investigation by a special legislative committee and Governor Calvin Coolidge appointed Macomber, Albert P. Langtry, and Henry A. Wyman to administer the office until a successor could be confirmed. In 1922, Macomber was elected a life member of the board of trustees at Tufts College. In 1926, he was named chairman of Massachusetts General Hospital's finance campaign committee.

== Horse racing ==
=== Thoroughbred racing ===
Macomber was a longtime supporter of Thoroughbred racing and breeding. One of his horses, Petee-Wrack, was a half-brother of Triple Crown winner Gallant Fox. Petee-Wrack ran in the 1928 Kentucky Derby and Preakness Stakes and won the 1928 Travers Stakes, 1929 Twin City Handicap, and 1930 Suburban Handicap. Petee-Wrack's offspring included Widener Challenge Cup winner Columbiana, Grand National winner Brother Jones, and Maryland Hunt Cup winners Peterski and Pine Rep.

Macomber was the first president of the Eastern Horse Club, which conducted races at The Country Club and Raceland from 1926 to 1935. After parimutuel betting was legalized in Massachusetts, Macomber, Charles Adams, Bayard Tuckerman Jr., and members of the Eastern Horse Club formed the Eastern Racing Association to open a thoroughbred race track in East Boston. At Macomber's suggestion, the new track was named Suffolk Downs. Beginning in 1956, the closing race of Suffolk Downs' spring meeting was called the John R. Macomber Memorial Handicap.

=== Steeplechase ===
In 1928, Macomber's horse Bridge won the inaugural Master of Foxhounds Association Steeplechase for hunters in front of a crowd of 10,000 at Pimlico Race Course. In 1929, his horse Coronel won The Country Club Grand National steeplechase race.

=== Raceland ===
Macomber was a lifelong resident of Framingham. He lived with his mother in the family home for 50 years. After her death, he developed Raceland, which served as his home as well as a venue for horse racing, dog shows, and automobile shows. Beginning in 1927, Macomber opened Raceland to the public free of charge for one day of the annual horse meet. In 1930, the stable and clubhouse were destroyed by fire, but he replaced the buildings in time for the next year's meet.

== Death ==
Macomber died at his home in Framingham on May 11, 1955, at the age of 80. His will provided for the continuance of Raceland to care for his horses and dogs for the rest of their lives. Never married, he left the bulk of his estate to the Massachusetts Society for the Prevention of Cruelty to Animals (MSPCA) and Massachusetts General Hospital.
