= The Man in the Net =

1959 film by Michael Curtiz

- Theatrical release poster
- Directed by: Michael Curtiz
- Screenplay by: Reginald Rose
- Based on: novel by Patrick Quentin
- Produced by: Walter Mirisch; Alan Ladd
- Starring: Alan Ladd; Carolyn Jones
- Cinematography: John F. Seitz
- Edited by: Richard V. Heermance
- Music by: Hans J. Salter
- Production companies: Jaguar Productions; The Mirisch Corporation
- Distributed by: United Artists
- Release dates: May 29, 1959 (Sweden); June 10, 1959 (United States)
- Running time: 97 minutes
- Country: United States
- Language: English

The Man in the Net is a 1959 American film noir mystery film starring Alan Ladd and Carolyn Jones, and directed by Michael Curtiz. The supporting cast features Diane Brewster.

== Plot ==
Ex-commercial artist John Hamilton and wife Linda leave New York for Stoneville, Connecticut. John spends his time sketching the town's children, whom he's befriended, but his ambitions to be a fine artist are frustrated by a failed art show and bad reviews. Linda longs to return to the city, where John has been offered a lucrative job at his old firm, but John feels the bustle of the city had exacerbated Linda's mental illness and fuelled her alcoholism.

John returns home after a day's sketching to find Steve Ritter, a local policeman, in his house while Linda is upstairs changing clothes. Steve is treated coldly by John, and leaves when Linda appears. The couple argues, and discuss a birthday party at the home of Brad and Vickie Carey, where the guests include another married couple, Roz and Gordon Moreland, as well as the wealthy father of Brad Carey. Linda refuses to go at the last minute. John attends alone, unfamilar with most of the guests, relaying Linda's preferred excuse of a migraine. When Linda unexpectedly appears at the party with a black eye, she claims John inflicted it and invented the migraine excuse for her. They return home where Linda confesses to an extramarital affair with Steve Ritter.

John agrees to go to New York to have a drink with his old boss, a meeting clandestinely arranged by his wife, and refuses the job offer. When he returns, Linda is nowhere to be found. Her suitcase is spotted by a city dump. Police and neighbors suspect John of murder and his house is stoned. When Ritter arrives to arrest him, John flees and seeks refuge with the town children in their secret cave.

Using a tape recording as bait, Brad reveals himself to be the one having an affair with Linda, and John learns Brad's father killed Linda to cover it up. Vickie's defence of Brad ceases when the incriminating tape reveals Brad only married her for her money. She leaves him for John, whose financial success is assured by a National Art Prize for a casual sketch of the children that aided him.

== Cast ==
- Alan Ladd as John Hamilton
- Carolyn Jones as Linda Hamilton
- Diane Brewster as Vickie Carey
- John Lupton as Brad Carey
- Charles McGraw as Sheriff Steve Ritter
- Tom Helmore as Gordon Moreland
- Betty Lou Holland as Roz Moreland
- John Alexander as Mr. Carey, Brad's father
- Ed Binns as State Police Capt. Green
- Kathryn Givney as Mrs. Carey, Brad's mother
- Barbara Beaird as Emily Jones
- Susan Gordon as Angel Jones
- Michael McGreevey as Buck Ritter
- Charles Herbert as Timmie Moreland
- Steven Perry as Leroy, Alonzo's son
- Alvin Childress as Alonzo

== Production ==
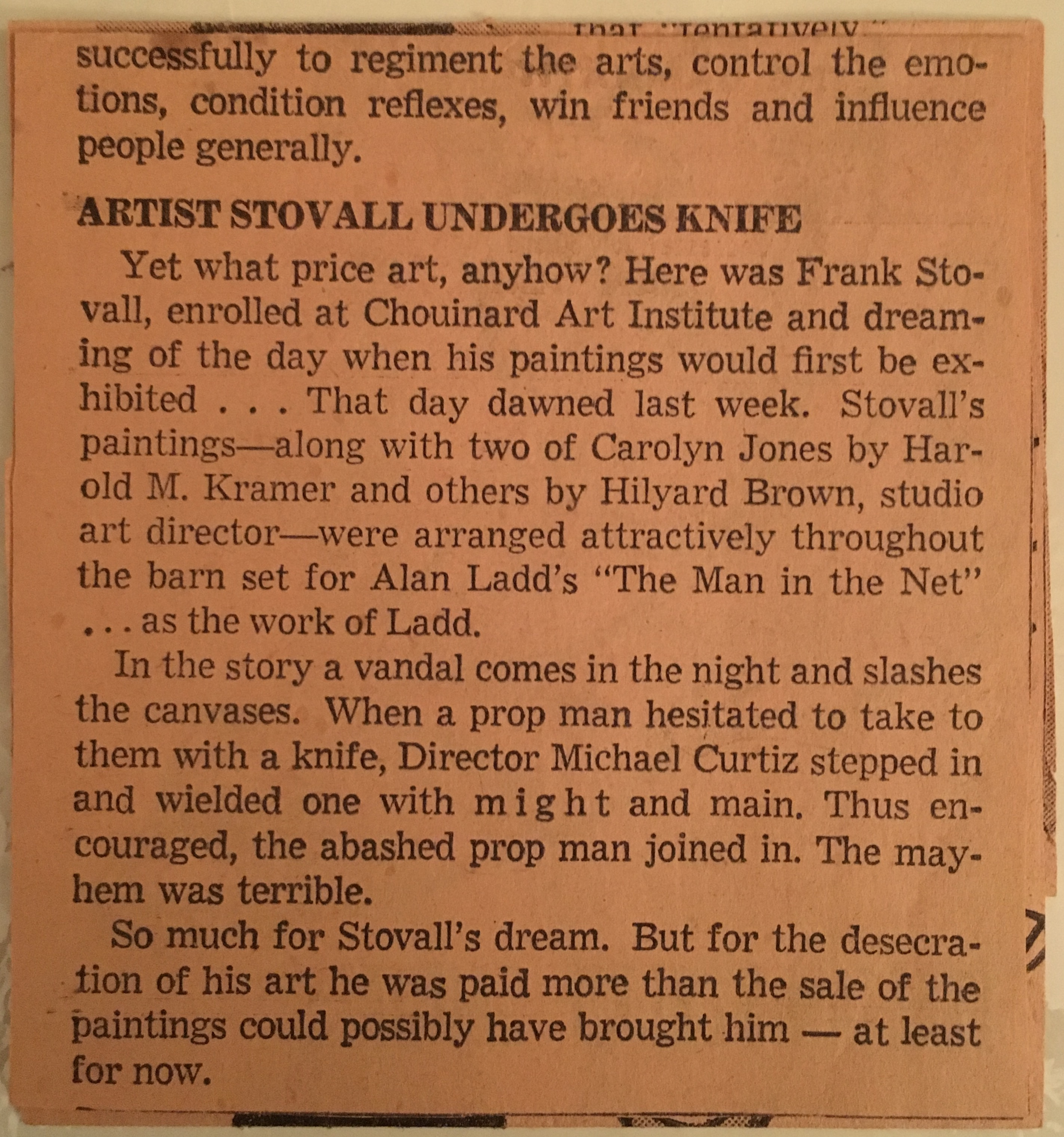
Newspaper clipping about the artists who provided the paintings for the film, June 1958

The film was based on a 1956 novel by Hugh Wheeler, writing as Patrick Quentin (a pseudonym that Wheeler and three other authors also used in collaborative efforts). Film rights were bought the following year by the Mirisch Company, who had a deal with United Artists. Alan Ladd was signed to star in January 1958. Reginald Rose, who had just written Man of the West for the Mirisches, signed to write the screenplay. Michael Curtiz directed.

Filming started 23 June. The film was mostly shot in Hollywood at the Goldwyn Studios with some location shooting at Raceland in Framingham, Massachusetts. Many of the outdoor scenes were shot in Thompson, Connecticut, on the town common where a set was built (gas station) and at the Ballard Farm. Also, the exterior of "The Chimney House", a location that figures prominently in the story is Roseland Cottage in Woodstock, Connecticut.

The paintings done by Ladd's character were painted by Frank Stovall, as well as two of Carolyn Jones by Harold M. Kramer and others by Hilyard Brown.

== Reception ==
When the film was released, Richard W. Nason, film critic for The New York Times, wrote "More interesting is the dialogue by Mr. Rose and his preoccupation with injustice. The lines show a keen love for kids and an honest regard for the need to interject reality into a yarn that is tediously familiar once it settles down into its melodramatic formula. Miss Jones plays the wife with controlled fanaticism. Mr. Ladd, on the other hand, performs in his usual, cool style, which under the hectic circumstances mutes his personality to the point of unreality."

== See also ==
- List of American films of 1959
