= Frank H. Pope =

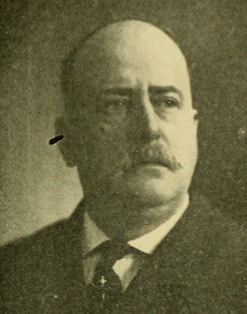

Massachusetts Auditor
- In office 1914–1915
- Governor: David I. Walsh
- Preceded by: John E. White
- Succeeded by: Alonzo B. Cook

Member of the Massachusetts House of Representatives
- In office 1908–1912

Personal details
- Born: March 7, 1854 Sandwich, Massachusetts
- Died: January 27, 1927 (aged 72) Brookline, Massachusetts
- Party: Democratic
- Spouse: Catherine Gertrude Yeaw
- Education: Dean Academy

Frank H. Pope (March 7, 1854 – January 27, 1927) was an elocutionist and newspaper reporter who served as a State Representative and Massachusetts Auditor from 1914–1915. He served one term as an Auditor and later became the State Commissioner of Small Loans.

== Early life and family ==
Frank Hinckley Pope was born in Sandwich, Massachusetts, on Cape Cod on March 7, 1854, to John W. Pope and Susan Cobb Hinckley. The family later moved to Marlboro, Massachusetts, and in 1877, Pope married Kate Yeaw.

== Career ==
Pope became a correspondent for the Boston Globe in 1881 serving in that capacity until he was elected to statewide office in 1914. The Popes moved to Leominster, Massachusetts. In 1906, he wrote Leominster's Lesson to the Growing Cities of Massachusetts. From 1908 to 1912, he served as member of the Massachusetts House of Representatives, elected as a Democrat representing Worcester County, District 11 which included Leominster. He then ran on the Democratic ticket for State Auditor in 1913 and was elected to one term. Pope was appointed Supervisor of Loans for the state by Governor David I. Walsh. He was reappointed to this position by Governor Samuel W. McCall in 1918.

== Death ==
Pope died on January 27, 1927, in Brookline, Massachusetts.

Party political offices
Preceded by James F. Carens	Democratic nominee for Auditor of Massachusetts; 1913, 1914	Succeeded by Jacob C. Morse
Political offices
Preceded by John E. White	Massachusetts Auditor; 1914–1915	Succeeded by Alonzo B. Cook
