= Elizabeth Stanton (Massachusetts politician) =

American politician (1909-1982)

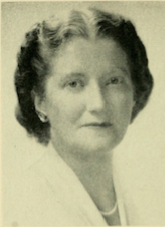

Member of the Massachusetts Senate from the 3rd Worcester district
- In office 1953–1962
- Preceded by: George W. Stanton
- Succeeded by: Joseph D. Ward

Democratic National Committeewoman from Massachusetts
- In office 1956–1962
- Preceded by: Margaret O'Riordan
- Succeeded by: Mary Fantasia

Personal details
- Born: May 27, 1909 Fitchburg, Massachusetts
- Died: March 25, 1982 (aged 72) Fitchburg, Massachusetts
- Resting place: Saint Bernard's Cemetery; Fitchburg, Massachusetts
- Spouse: George W. Stanton (1941–1952; his death)

Elizabeth Ann Stanton (May 27, 1909 – March 25, 1982) was an American politician who represented the 3rd Worcester district in the Massachusetts Senate from 1953 to 1962.

== Early life ==
Stanton was born in Fitchburg, Massachusetts on May 27, 1909 to George Bernard and Clara Isabelle (Sculley) Dormin. She graduated from Fitchburg High School and the State Teachers College at Fitchburg. She worked as a school teacher from 1931 until 1941, when she married state senator George W. Stanton.

== Political career ==
George W. Stanton died on April 24, 1952 and Stanton was elected to her husband's senate seat later that year. In 1956, she defeated Margaret O'Riordan to become the Democratic National Committeewoman from Massachusetts. In 1959, Stanton was one of 9 candidates in the legislative election for Secretary of the Commonwealth of Massachusetts, a position that was vacant following the death of Edward J. Cronin. The legislature elected Joseph D. Ward 169 votes to 92. In 1962, Stanton was appointed postmaster of Fitchburg, a post she held until 1979. While postmaster, Stanton was also a member of Fitchburg's board of health and was vice chairwoman of the Burbank Hospital Board of Trustees. In 1981, she was appointed to the Fitchburg State College board of trustees.

Stanton died on March 25, 1982 in Fitchburg, Massachusetts.
