= Daniel J. Gallagher =

American lawyer (1873–1953)

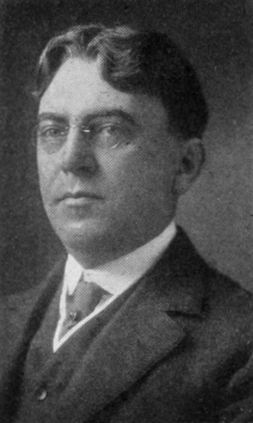

United States Attorney for the District of Massachusetts
- In office 1920–1921
- Preceded by: Thomas J. Boynton
- Succeeded by: Robert O. Harris

Personal details
- Born: August 31, 1873 Newton, Massachusetts
- Died: March 24, 1953 (aged 79) Cambridge, Massachusetts
- Resting place: St. Joseph Cemetery
- Party: Democratic
- Education: Boston College; Boston University School of Law
- Occupation: Attorney

Daniel J. Gallagher (August 31, 1873 – March 24, 1953) was an American attorney and political figure who served as a delegate to the Massachusetts Constitutional Convention of 1917-1918, the United States Attorney for the District of Massachusetts from 1920 to 1921, and a delegate to 1932 Democratic National Convention from Massachusetts.

== Biography ==
Daniel J. Gallagher was born in Newton, Massachusetts on August 31, 1873. He attended Boston College and the Boston University School of Law.

His son, Owen A. Gallagher, was a member of the Massachusetts General Court.

Daniel J. Gallagher died in Cambridge, Massachusetts on March 24, 1953, and was buried at St. Joseph Cemetery in West Roxbury.
