= Henry E. Turner (Massachusetts politician) =

American politician

Henry Edward Turner Jr.
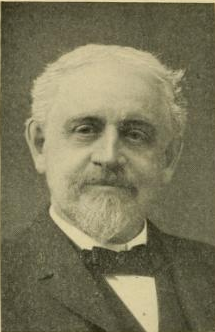

Auditor of the Commonwealth of Massachusetts
- In office 1901–1911
- Governor: Winthrop Murray Crane; John L. Bates; William L. Douglas; Curtis Guild Jr. Eben Sumner Draper
- Preceded by: John W. Kimball
- Succeeded by: John E. White

Personal details
- Born: May 4, 1842 Boston, Massachusetts
- Died: June 28, 1911 (aged 69) Malden, Massachusetts
- Spouse: Lucinda A. Barrett (m. 1863; died 1865)
- Parent(s): Henry Edward Turner Sr. Sophronia Ann Burns
- Education: Pierce Academy

Henry Edward Turner Jr. (May 4, 1842 – June 28, 1911) was an American politician who served as member of the Massachusetts House of Representatives and as Massachusetts Auditor.

== Biography ==
He was born in Boston, Massachusetts, on May 4, 1842, to Henry Edward Turner Sr. and Sophronia Ann Burns.

He married Lucinda A. Barrett on July 1, 1863. She died in March, 1865. On December 17, 1867, he married Huldah S. Crowell of Malden, Massachusetts, and they had two children, Mrs. Anabel Thorne of Malden and Harry H. Turner of Walla Walla, Washington.

He served as Auditor of the Commonwealth of Massachusetts from 1901 until his death.

He died on June 28, 1911, at his home, 37 Washington street, Malden, Massachusetts.

Political offices
Preceded by John W. Kimball	Massachusetts Auditor; 1901– 1911	Succeeded by John E. White
