= Clare Barnes Jr. =

American author and advertising agency art director (c. 1907–1992)

- Born: c. 1907; Boston, Massachusetts, United States
- Died: February 2, 1992 (aged 85); Manhattan, New York City, New York, United States
- Education: Yale University
- Occupations: Author; Advertising agency art director
- Writing career
- Genre: Non fiction

Clarence A. Barnes Jr. (usually referred to as Clare Barnes Jr. during his days as a popular author) (c. 1907 – February 2, 1992) was an American author and advertising agency art director. He was best known for his series of books, starting in 1949 with White Collar Zoo, which featured animal photos with humorous captions. White Collar Zoo was the number 1 non-fiction bestseller of 1949 on the New York Times Best Seller list, and its followup Home Sweet Zoo was number 4.

Barnes was born in Boston and received an undergraduate degree from Yale University in 1929. He worked for a number of advertising agencies. He died in his Manhattan home on February 2, 1992, of emphysema at age 85. He also had a home in Edgartown, Massachusetts.

Barnes' father, Clarence A. Barnes, was a politician and the attorney general of Massachusetts in the late 1940s.

== Bibliography ==
- White Collar Zoo (July 1949)
- Home Sweet Zoo (December 1949)
- Campus Zoo (1950)
- Political Zoo (1952)
- Sleeping Under Blankets (1955)
- White Collar Zoo Revisited (1961)
- The Secret of Cooking for Dogs (with Martin A. Gardner) (1964)
- The Secret of Cooking for Cats (with Martin A. Gardner) (1965)
- John F. Kennedy: Scrimshaw Collector (1969)
