= Jacob H. Loud =

American politician

Jacob Hersey Loud

27th Treasurer and Receiver-General of Massachusetts
- In office 1866–1871
- Governor: Alexander H. Bullock; William Claflin
- Preceded by: Henry K. Oliver
- Succeeded by: Charles Adams Jr.

Member of the Massachusetts Senate
- In office 1864–1865

Member of the Massachusetts House of Representatives
- In office 1863–1863

23rd Treasurer and Receiver-General of Massachusetts
- In office 1853–1855
- Governor: John H. Clifford; Emory Washburn
- Preceded by: Charles B. Hall
- Succeeded by: Thomas J. Marsh

Register of Probate for Plymouth County, Massachusetts
- In office 1830–1852
- Appointed by: Levi Lincoln Jr.
- Preceded by: Beza Hayward

Member of the Plymouth, Massachusetts Board of Selectmen

Moderator of the Plymouth, Massachusetts Town Meeting

Personal details
- Born: February 5, 1802 Hingham, Massachusetts
- Died: February 2, 1880 (aged 77) Boston, Massachusetts
- Spouse: Elizabeth Loring
- Education: Brown University
- Profession: Lawyer

Jacob Hersey Loud (February 5, 1802 – February 2, 1880) was a Massachusetts lawyer and an American politician who served as a member of the Massachusetts House of Representatives, the Massachusetts Senate, for twenty two years as the Register of Probate for Plymouth County, Massachusetts, and twice as the Treasurer and Receiver-General of Massachusetts.

== See also ==
- 85th Massachusetts General Court (1864)

== Notes ==
Political offices
Preceded by Charles B. Hall	23rd Treasurer and Receiver-General of Massachusetts; 1853–1855	Succeeded by Thomas J. Marsh
Preceded by Henry K. Oliver	27th Treasurer and Receiver-General of Massachusetts; 1866–1871	Succeeded by Charles Adams Jr.
