= Fred J. Burrell =

American politician and businessman (1889-1955)

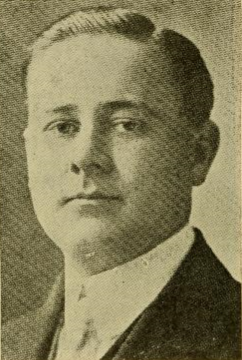

Treasurer and Receiver-General of Massachusetts
- In office January 21, 1920 – September 3, 1920
- Governor: Calvin Coolidge
- Preceded by: Charles L. Burrill
- Succeeded by: Albert P. Langtry; Henry A. Wyman; John R. Macomber (acting)

Delegate to the 1917 Massachusetts Constitutional Convention Representing the 26th Middlesex District of the Massachusetts House of Representatives
- In office June 6, 1917 – April 6, 1918

Member of the Massachusetts House of Representatives 26th Middlesex District
- In office 1917–1919

Personal details
- Born: March 12, 1889 Medford, Massachusetts, U.S.
- Party: Republican
- Occupation: Publisher of textile textbooks, Advertising agent

Fred Jefferson Burrell (March 12, 1889 – October 15, 1955) was a Massachusetts businessman and politician who served in the Massachusetts House of Representatives and as Treasurer and Receiver-General of Massachusetts from January 21, 1920 – September 3, 1920.

== 1917 Massachusetts Constitutional Convention ==
In 1916 the Massachusetts legislature and electorate approved a calling of a Constitutional Convention. In May 1917, Burell was elected to serve as a member of the Massachusetts Constitutional Convention of 1917, representing the 26th Middlesex District of the Massachusetts House of Representatives.

== Massachusetts Treasurer ==
Elected Treasurer in 1919, Burrell resigned from the position on September 3, 1920, following an investigation by a special legislative committee, which revealed that banks using the services of an advertising agency owned by Burrell received increased amounts of state money. Burrell was also criticized for depositing $125,000 of state funds with Hanover Trust Company, a bank run by Charles Ponzi.

Burrell denied any wrongdoing and ran for Treasurer five more times after his resignation, losing to Charles F. Hurley in 1930, John E. Hurley in 1944 and 1950, Roy C. Papalia in the 1952 Republican primary, and Laurence Curtis in the 1956 Republican primary.

== See also ==
- 1917 Massachusetts legislature
- 1918 Massachusetts legislature
- 1919 Massachusetts legislature

Party political offices
Preceded by Charles L. Burrill	Republican nominee for Treasurer and Receiver-General of Massachusetts; 1919	Succeeded by James Jackson
Preceded by John W. Haigis	Republican nominee for Treasurer and Receiver-General of Massachusetts; 1930	Succeeded by Francis Prescott
Preceded by Laurence Curtis	Republican nominee for Treasurer and Receiver-General of Massachusetts; 1944	Succeeded by Laurence Curtis
Preceded by Laurence Curtis	Republican nominee for Treasurer and Receiver-General of Massachusetts; 1950	Succeeded by Roy C. Papalia
