= Margaret O'Riordan =

American politician

Margaret Mary (Cummings) O'Riordan was an American political figure who served as Massachusetts' Democratic National Committeewoman and was the Democratic nominee for Massachusetts Secretary of the Commonwealth in 1944.

== Early life ==
O'Riordan was born in Boston and spent most of her life in Jamaica Plain. She was the daughter of Mathew Cummings, a contractor and a national leader of the Ancient Order of Hibernians. O'Riordan's first involvement with fraternal orders came at the age of 16 with the Ladies Auxiliary of the Ancient Order of Hibernians. She was married to David O'Riordan and they had one son and four daughters.

== Political activities ==
In 1924, O'Riordan was elected as the Democratic state committeewoman for Jamaica Plain. In 1928 she became president of the Jamaica Plain Democratic Woman's Club. From 1932 to 1936 she was the vice-chair of the Democratic State Committee in charge of women's affairs. During the 1934 Massachusetts gubernatorial election she took the stump for James Michael Curley. She also served as president of the United Democratic Women of Massachusetts.

O'Riordan presided over an April 18, 1936, meeting of the United Democratic Women of Massachusetts where Governor James Michael Curley announced that he intended to appoint a woman as state librarian and would allow those gathered to choose who he would nominate. The meeting unanimously chose O'Riordan. She was the first woman ever nominated for the position. Curley formally nominated her on April 22, 1936. O'Riordan's nomination was opposed by the Massachusetts Library Association, Massachusetts Civic League, and the Charles River Library Club due to her lack of training or experience as a librarian. The Massachusetts Governor's Council rejected O'Riordan's nomination five times. In September 1936, Curley nominated Dennis A. Dooley, dean of the Boston College Law School, as state librarian and he was unanimously confirmed.

In 1940, O'Riordan was elected Massachusetts' Democratic national committeewoman. She held this position until 1956, when she was defeated by Elizabeth Stanton.

In 1944, O'Riordan was a candidate for Secretary of the Commonwealth. She lost the Democratic primary to Lynn, Massachusetts, school committee member John M. Bresnahan. Bresnahan also won the Democratic primary for the United States House of Representatives seat in Massachusetts's 6th congressional district and was unable to run in both races. Bresnahan dropped out of the Secretary's race and the Democratic state committee unanimously chose O'Riordan to replace Bresnahan. O'Riordan lost the general election to 24-year incumbent Frederic W. Cook 59% to 40%.

O'Riordan died on November 16, 1972, at Cushing Hospital in Framingham, Massachusetts. She was buried in Holyhood Cemetery in Brookline, Massachusetts.

Party political offices
Preceded by Joseph J. Buckey	Democratic nominee for Secretary of the Commonwealth of Massachusetts; 1944	Succeeded by Benedict F. Fitzgerald Jr.
