= Russell A. Wood =

American politician (1880-1952)

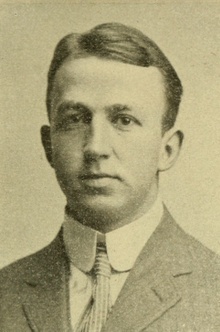

Massachusetts State Auditor
- In office 1939–1941
- Governor: Leverett Saltonstall
- Preceded by: Thomas H. Buckley
- Succeeded by: Thomas J. Buckley

Personal details
- Born: March 25, 1880 Cambridge, Massachusetts, U.S.
- Died: September 19, 1952 (aged 72) Cambridge, Massachusetts, U.S.
- Party: Republican (1904–1912); Progressive Party (1912–1914); Republican (1915–1952)
- Education: Harvard College

Russell Abner Wood (March 25, 1880 – September 19, 1952) was an American politician who was a perennial candidate for statewide office in Massachusetts. He served as Massachusetts State Auditor from 1939 to 1941.

== Early life ==
Wood was born on March 25, 1880, in Cambridge, Massachusetts. He attended Cambridge public schools and graduated from Harvard College in 1903. While at Harvard, Wood served as an editor of The Harvard Crimson alongside Franklin D. Roosevelt. After graduating, Wood worked as a newspaper reporter in Boston.

== Political career ==
=== State representative ===
Wood served on the Cambridge Common Council from 1904 to 1906. From 1909 to 1911 he represented the Third Middlesex District in the Massachusetts House of Representatives. He served on the house committee on taxation all three years he was in the house and served as chairman during his final year. He also chaired the committee on constitutional amendments in 1910. Wood broke with his party in the 1911 United States Senate election in Massachusetts, voting for Harvard University president A. Lawrence Lowell over Republican incumbent Henry Cabot Lodge. Wood was one of the earliest supporters of Prohibition in Massachusetts.

=== Progressive Party ===
In 1911, Wood challenged incumbent Massachusetts Secretary of the Commonwealth Albert P. Langtry. Wood, who ran as a progressive, anti-machine candidate, lost to Langtry in the Republican primary. On December 29, 1911, Wood was elected secretary of the Militant Progressive Republican League of Massachusetts, which was formed to oppose the election of Lodge and Winthrop M. Crane as delegates to the 1912 Republican National Convention. He also founded the Young Men's Progressive Municipal Party of Cambridge. Wood was the Progressive Party nominee for Secretary of the Commonwealth in 1912, 1913, and 1914. In 1914, Governor David I. Walsh nominated Wood for a one-year term on the Commission on Economy and Efficiency. He was renominated in 1915, however the Massachusetts Governor's Council delayed acting on it and it was eventually withdrawn.

=== Return to the Republican party ===
Following the demise of the Progressive Party, Wood returned to the Republican Party. He served as an assistant secretary to Governor Samuel W. McCall. After McCall left office, Wood took a job in the state tax division, which he would hold until he was sworn in as Auditor in 1939. In 1920 he finished third in a five-candidate Republican primary for Secretary of the Commonwealth. In 1922, Wood, who was president of the Anti-Lodge Club, chose to run against the Senator in that year's election. However, on August 7, 1922, he withdrew from the election in favor of Joseph Walker. Wood would later denounce his maverick ways and become a strong supporter of the party line. In 1924 he managed Merrill Griswold's unsuccessful campaign for the United States House of Representatives seat in Massachusetts's 8th congressional district. In 1924 and 1926 he was an unsuccessful candidate for Register of Probate and Insolvency for Middlesex County. In 1928, Wood finished third in the Republican primary for Treasurer and Receiver-General of Massachusetts. In 1930, Wood finished sixth in the Republican primary for state treasurer. In 1932 and 1934 he was an unsuccessful candidate for the 3rd district seat on the Massachusetts Governor's Council.

=== Cambridge school committee ===
In 1927, Wood was elected to a three-year term on the Cambridge school committee. He was sworn into office on January 2, 1928, even though city solicitor Peter J. Nelligan informed him that taking an oath of office was not required and “would have no legal significance”. He would remain on the board until his defeat in 1947.

In March 1928, Wood declared the Willard School was a fire hazard and demanded emergency action. State fire inspector Ambrose W. Izelle disputed Wood’s assertion that the Willard School was unsafe. In January 1929, the school committee considered officially reprimanding Wood for his conduct during a dispute with a school headmaster. Henry W. Holmes, dean of the Harvard School of Education, presented the signatures of 200 Cambridge residents who supported the headmaster. The resolution failed 3-3. In 1929, Wood ran for Mayor of Cambridge, however city solicitor Nelligan ruled that Wood was ineligible for the office because he still had two years left on the school committee and state law prevented any member of the school committee from holding another office. On June 7, 1937, Wood struck a fellow school committee member over the head with a large pad of paper and threw the contents of an ashtray and a pencil at him.

=== State auditor ===
In 1936, Wood was the Republican nominee for state auditor. He lost the general election to Democratic incumbent Thomas H. Buckley 50% to 47%. Wood was the nominee again in 1938 and this time defeated Buckley 49% to 48%. Wood handled over $20 million in orders following the 1940 New England hurricane, a record for the auditor's office. He was defeated for reelection by Thomas J. Buckley, an auditor for the Rug-O-Vator Company and a former WPA bookkeeper who had never held public office before. Buckley's victory was believed to be helped by voters who confused him with former auditor Thomas H. Buckley. Buckley was the only Democrat to win statewide office that year.

=== Saltonstall administration ===
In January 1941, Governor Leverett Saltonstall appointed Wood as chairman of the Fall River, Massachusetts, finance committee. In 1942 he was appointed to the position of deputy state income tax assessor. He held this job until his retirement from state service in 1949. He then returned to the newspaper business, running a news service for trade publications.

=== Later bids for office ===
In 1942, Wood was once again the Republican nominee for auditor. Although The Boston Globe initially reported that Wood had won, Buckley ultimately prevailed by 55,575 votes. In 1944, Wood lost the Republican nomination for auditor to former Registrar of Motor Vehicles Frank A. Goodwin. In the 1946 election, Wood lost to Buckley by only 11,674 votes. He lost to Buckley again in 1948, this time by a margin of almost 500,000 votes. In 1950, Wood instead ran for Secretary of the Commonwealth. He won a 7 candidate primary to secure the Republican nomination, but lost to Democratic incumbent Edward J. Cronin 55% to 44%.

On September 19, 1952, Wood collapsed and died of a heart attack while walking home from the grocery store. He was 72 years old.

Party political offices
First	Progressive nominee for Secretary of the Commonwealth of Massachusetts; 1912, 1913, 1914	Succeeded by None
Preceded by Alonzo B. Cook	Republican nominee for Auditor of Massachusetts; 1936, 1938, 1940, 1940, 1942	Succeeded by Frank A. Goodwin
Preceded by Frank A. Goodwin	Republican nominee for Auditor of Massachusetts; 1946, 1948	Succeeded by William G. Andrew
Preceded by Frederic W. Cook	Republican nominee for Secretary of the Commonwealth of Massachusetts; 1950	Succeeded by Beatrice Hancock Mullaney
