= James H. Vahey Jr. =

American lawyer and political figure (1900–1949)

James H. Vahey

Chairman of the Massachusetts Democratic State Committee
- In office February 19, 1949 – November 3, 1949
- Preceded by: John T. McMorrow
- Succeeded by: John C. Carr

Personal details
- Born: June 29, 1900 Watertown, Massachusetts
- Died: November 3, 1949 (aged 49) Boston
- Party: Democratic
- Education: Princeton University; Boston University School of Law
- Occupation: Lawyer

James Henry Vahey (1900–1949) was an American lawyer and political figure who served as chairman of the Massachusetts Democratic State Committee.

== Early life ==
Vahey was born on June 29, 1900, in Watertown, Massachusetts. His father, James H. Vahey Sr., was a prominent attorney and two time Democratic nominee for Governor of Massachusetts. During World War I, Vahey served in the United States Navy as a quartermaster. He graduated from Princeton University in 1922 and Boston University Law School in 1925.

== Legal career ==
After law school, Vahey worked in his father's law office. Following his death in 1929, the younger Vahey took over the firm and also succeed his father as counsel for the Boston Street Carmen's Union and general counsel for the Amalgamated Association of Street and Electric Railway Employees of America. He later succeeded Frederick Mansfield as counsel for the Massachusetts Federation of Labor. During his career, Vahey represented as many as forty labor unions. During World War II he served as chief counsel for the American Red Cross offices in the Secretary of War and Secretary of the Navy's office. He was tasked with reviewing the service records of discharged servicemen as part of the G.I. Bill. He was responsible for getting the military to revise the records of pilots who broke down after many missions over enemy territory. In 1946 he was appointed assistant corporation counsel for the city of Boston.

== Party chairman ==
In 1948, Vahey was a leader of Paul A. Dever gubernatorial campaign and Harry S. Truman's presidential campaign in Massachusetts. Following Dever's election he and his chief secretary J. John Fox, both former law school classmates of Vahey's, backed him for chairman of the Massachusetts Democratic State Committee. He was elected on February 19, 1949. His tenure as chairman was short however, as Vahey died suddenly on November 3, 1949, after a brief illness.
