= John H. Corcoran =

American politician

John Hubert Corcoran Jr.

Mayor of Cambridge, Massachusetts
- In office 1942 – December 28, 1945
- Preceded by: Francis C. Sennott
- Succeeded by: John D. Lynch

Member of the Cambridge, Massachusetts City Council

Personal details
- Born: January 15, 1897
- Died: December 28, 1945 (aged 48) Boston, Massachusetts
- Party: Democratic
- Education: Harvard University (A.B., M.B.A.)

Military service
- Branch/service: Coast Artillery, United States Army
- Years of service: 1918
- Rank: Lieutenant
- Battles/wars: World War I

John Hubert Corcoran Jr. (January 15, 1897 – December 28, 1945) was a Massachusetts politician who served on the Cambridge, Massachusetts City Council and as the mayor of Cambridge, Massachusetts.

Corcoran's father, John Hubert Corcoran Sr. was a member and president of the Cambridge Common Council and the Cambridge Board of Aldermen.

== Early life ==
Corcoran was born on January 15, 1897, to John Hubert Corcoran Sr. and Ann M. (Ford) Corcoran.

Corcoran attended Harvard College, he graduated with an A.B. in 1918.

On April 23, 1918, Corcoran enlisted as a private in the U.S. Coast Artillery, he was assigned to Fort Strong in Boston Harbor. Corcoran was promoted to Corporal on June 20. On July 4, Corcoran was assigned to the Coast Artillery Officers Training Camp, Fort Monroe, Virginia and promoted to Lieutenant. Corcoran was later transferred to Fort McKinley, Portland, Maine and the 33rd Coast Artillery, Camp Abraham Eustis, Virginia. He was discharged on December 11, 1918.

Corcoran returned to Harvard and received an M.B.A. in June 1920. Corcoran wrote his graduate theses on the Departmental Layout of the Proposed store of a Coöperative Society.

== Political career ==
=== Mayor of Cambridge ===
Cambridge voters changed the city government from a strong mayor to a Plan E (City Council-City Manager) form of government, with Cambridge having a ceremonial mayor. Corcoran, a member of the Cambridge City Council in 1942 was chosen by his fellow councilors to be City's Ceremonial Mayor.

=== 1944 U.S. Senate campaign ===
In 1944 Massachusetts held a special election to fill the Senate seat formerly held by Henry Cabot Lodge Jr. Lodge had resigned from the Senate to join the Army. Corcoran was the Democratic nominee, he lost the election to Leverett Saltonstall by more than 400,000 votes.

== Death ==
Corcoran died unexpectedly, at age 48, from pneumonia in a Boston, Massachusetts hospital on December 28, 1945.

== Notes ==
Political offices
Preceded by Francis C. Sennott	Mayor of Cambridge, Massachusetts; 1942–1945	Succeeded by John D. Lynch
Party political offices
Preceded by Joseph E. Casey	Democratic Party nominee for United States Senator from Massachusetts (Class II); 1944	Succeeded by John I. Fitzgerald
