= William E. Hurley =

American politician

Treasurer and Receiver-General of Massachusetts
- In office 1937–1943
- Governor: Charles F. Hurley; Leverett Saltonstall
- Preceded by: Charles F. Hurley
- Succeeded by: Francis X. Hurley

Personal details
- Born: August 26, 1875 Boston, Massachusetts
- Party: Republican
- Education: Burdett College

William E. Hurley was an American politician who served as Treasurer and Receiver-General of Massachusetts from 1937 to 1943.

Hurley was the post master of Boston from 1918 to 1920 and from 1930 to 1935.

William E. Hurley defeated former Marlborough state representative James M. Hurley in the 1936 election, succeeding Charles F. Hurley, who had chosen to run for governor instead of running for reelection. Because he was constitutionally limited to three, two year terms, William E. Hurley did not run for reelection in 1942 and was succeeded by former State Auditor Francis X. Hurley.

== Notes ==
Party political offices
Preceded by Oscar U. Dionne	Republican nominee for Treasurer and Receiver-General of Massachusetts; 1936, 1938, 1940	Succeeded by Laurence Curtis
Political offices
Preceded by Charles F. Hurley	Treasurer and Receiver-General of Massachusetts; 1937–1943	Succeeded by Francis X. Hurley
