= Robert T. Bushnell =

American politician (1896–1949)

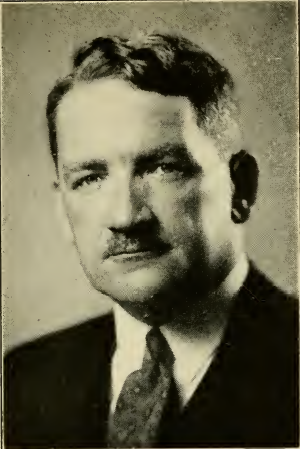

30th Attorney General of Massachusetts
- In office 1941–1945
- Governor: Leverett Saltonstall
- Preceded by: Paul A. Dever
- Succeeded by: Clarence A. Barnes

Middlesex County District Attorney
- In office 1927–1931
- Preceded by: Arthur K. Reading
- Succeeded by: Warren L. Bishop

Personal details
- Born: Robert Tyng Bushnell; January 9, 1896 New York City, U.S.
- Died: October 23, 1949 (aged 53) New York City, U.S.
- Party: Republican
- Spouse: Sylvia P. Folsom (1924-1949)
- Education: Harvard University
- Profession: Lawyer

Robert Tyng Bushnell (January 9, 1896 – October 23, 1949) was an American politician who served as Massachusetts Attorney General from 1941 to 1945.

== Early life and career ==
Born in New York City, Robert Tyng Bushnell graduated from Phillips Andover Academy, Harvard College, and Harvard Law School.

From 1927 to 1931, Bushnell served as District Attorney of Middlesex County, President of the Republican Club of Massachusetts, and chairman of the Boston chapter of the Motion Picture Research Council before being elected Attorney General.

== Attorney General of Massachusetts ==
As Attorney General, Bushnell lead the investigation into the Cocoanut Grove fire. Bushnell's investigation resulted a reform of fire codes and club owner Barney Welansky being convicted of involuntary manslaughter.

In 1941, Bushnell and state representative Benjamin Priest conducted the prosecution during the impeachment trial of Massachusetts Governor's Councilor Daniel H. Coakley. On October 2, 1941, the Massachusetts Senate found Coakley guilty on 10 of the 14 articles on impeachment. The Senate voted 28 to 10 to remove Coakley from office and 23 to 15 to bar him for life from holding a place of "profit or honor or trust" in the Commonwealth.

In 1942, Bushnell tried to have fascist leader Edward Holton James committed to a psychiatric state hospital after he was indicted on charges of criminal libel.

In 1943, he indicted Boston Police Commissioner Joseph F. Timilty and six of his subordinates on charges of conspiracy to permit the operation of gambling houses and the registration of bets.

== Death ==
Bushnell died of a heart attack on October 23, 1949, in his suite at the Hotel Royalton in New York City.

Party political offices
Preceded by Clarence A. Barnes	Republican nominee for Attorney General of Massachusetts; 1940, 1942	Succeeded by Clarence A. Barnes
Legal offices
Preceded by Paul A. Dever	Massachusetts Attorney General; 1941–1945	Succeeded by Clarence A. Barnes
