= Alonzo B. Cook =

American politician (1866-1956)

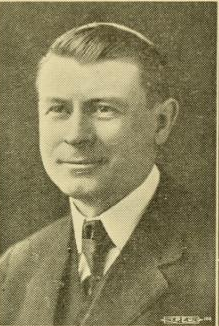

Massachusetts Auditor
- In office 1915–1931
- Governor: David I. Walsh; Samuel W. McCall; Calvin Coolidge; Channing H. Cox; Alvan T. Fuller; Frank G. Allen
- Preceded by: Frank H. Pope
- Succeeded by: Francis X. Hurley

Personal details
- Born: July 31, 1866 Boston, Massachusetts, U.S.
- Died: December 22, 1956 (aged 90) Boston, Massachusetts, U.S.
- Party: Republican; Economy
- Education: Sherwin Grammar, Roxbury High School, University Law School

Alonzo B. Cook (July 31, 1866 – December 22, 1956) was an American politician who served as Massachusetts Auditor from 1915 to 1931 and was a candidate for Mayor of Boston in 1925 and in 1937; and United States Senator in 1936.

== Biography ==
He was born on July 31, 1866, to Levi F. Cook and Eliza Ryan. One of his brothers, Washington Cook, was also involved in politics.

Party political offices
Preceded by John E. White	Republican nominee for Auditor of Massachusetts; 1914, 1915, 1916, 1917, 1918, 1919, 1920, 1922, 1924, 1926, 1928, 1930, 1932, 1934	Succeeded by Russell A. Wood
Political offices
Preceded by Frank H. Pope	Massachusetts Auditor; 1915–1931	Succeeded by Francis X. Hurley
