= John C. Carr (mayor) =

American politician (1891/1892–1967)

City Manager of Medford, Massachusetts
- In office 1961–1962
- Preceded by: Edward J. Conroy
- Succeeded by: Howard Reed

Chairman of the Massachusetts Democratic Party
- In office 1949–1956
- Preceded by: James H. Vahey Jr.
- Succeeded by: William H. Burke, Jr.

13th Mayor of Medford, Massachusetts
- In office 1938–1943
- Preceded by: John J. Irwin
- Succeeded by: George L. Callahan (acting)

Personal details
- Born: 1891 or 1892 Cambridge, Massachusetts
- Died: June 27, 1967 (aged 75) Medford, Massachusetts
- Party: Democratic
- Children: John C. Carr, Jr.
- Profession: Insurance

John C. Carr (1891/1892 – June 27, 1967) was an American politician who served as Mayor of Medford, Massachusetts, Chairman of the Massachusetts Democratic Party, and City Manager of Medford.

== Early life ==
Carr was born in Cambridge, Massachusetts, and raised in Charlestown. He was the seventh of thirteen children born to Frank and Bridget (Berkeley) Carr, Irish immigrants who met and married in the United States. At the age of 21 he passed a civil service examination and got a job as a teller's clerk in the Boston Collectors office. During World War I, Carr served in the United States military. He married Florence Brennan in 1915. Two years later they moved to Medford. Their children include John C. Carr, Jr., who ran for US congress in 1952.

== Board of Aldermen ==
In 1931, Carr was elected to the Medford Board of Aldermen. He moved to Hartford, Connecticut, for business the following year, however he later returned to Medford and served two more terms on the Board. While on the Board, Carr led the effort to eradicate diphtheria in the city.

== Mayor ==
Carr was elected mayor in 1937 in a non-partisan election. He was reelected in 1939 and 1941 as a member of the Democratic Party. During Carr's tenure, the city undertook a building program that replaced the city's final four wooden schools with modern structures and added a 2400-seat auditorium to the High School. He also left Medford with a surplus while maintaining the same tax rate the city had when he entered office.

In 1940, Carr ran for Lieutenant Governor of Massachusetts. He lost the Democratic primary to Owen A. Gallagher by 78 votes. Two years later, Carr won the nomination unopposed, but lost in the general election to Republican incumbent Horace T. Cahill.

During his final term, Carr resigned to enter the armed forces. During World War II, Carr rose to the rank of lieutenant colonel and served as Military Governor of Manila and Tacloban.

He was the Democratic nominee for mayor in 1947, but lost to incumbent Walter E. Lawrence by 808 votes.

== Party Chairman ==
On November 20, 1949, Carr was elected Chairman of the Massachusetts Democratic Party in a special election to finish the term of the deceased James Vahey. His candidacy was supported by Paul A. Dever, Maurice J. Tobin, James Michael Curley, and John William McCormack.

He was reelected in 1952, however his election was challenged by William H. Burke, Jr. On December 15, 1955, the Massachusetts Supreme Judicial Court ruled that Carr's reelection was not legal. On January 11, 1956, both sides came to an agreement and Burke was elected chairman.

== City Manager ==
Carr was appointed City Manager on April 13, 1961, by a 4 to 3 vote. Carr's appointment was challenged by his opponents, as they believed City Councilor John C. Carr, Jr.'s vote for his father was a conflict-of-interest. They also believed he was too old to serve, as the 69-year-old Carr would be forced into mandatory retirement in 11 months. The appointment was upheld by the Middlesex County District Attorney.

During his tenure as City Manager, Carr promoted the construction of the Public Safety Building and the Kennedy School.

In the 1961 election, seven candidates endorsed by the Plan E Civic Association, an organization devoted to removing Carr from office, were elected to the City Council. On January 16, 1962, the Council unanimously voted to dismiss Carr.

Carr died on June 27, 1967, in Medford, at 75 years of age.

Party political offices
| Preceded by Owen A. Gallagher | Democratic nominee for Lieutenant Governor of Massachusetts; 1942 | Succeeded by John B. Carr |
