= John B. Carr =

American politician

- Born: September 18, 1900; Somerville, Massachusetts, US
- Died: June 6, 1969 (aged 68); Somerville, Massachusetts, US
- Burial place: Cambridge Cemetery, Massachusetts
- Occupation: Politician
- Years active: 1920–1962

Member of the Somerville Board of Assessors
- In office 1943–1962
- Appointed by: G. Edward Bradley
- 6 years: Chairman

Democratic Party nominee for Lieutenant Governor of Massachusetts
- Election date 1944
- Running mate: Maurice Tobin (candidate for Governor, won election)
- Opponent: Robert Bradford (won Lieutenant Governor election)

Democratic Party nominee for Massachusetts's 8th congressional district
- Election date 1950
- Opponent: Angier Goodwin
- Incumbent: Angier Goodwin

John B. Carr (September 18, 1900 – June 6, 1969) was an American politician who was active in the Massachusetts Democratic Party. He rose from obscurity to win the party's nomination for Lieutenant Governor of Massachusetts in 1944. He also served as chairman of the Somerville, Massachusetts, board of assessors.

== Early life ==
Carr was born and raised in Somerville. After graduating from Somerville High School he traveled the country as a commercial photographer. In 1932 he met his wife in Rochester, New York. The couple settled in Somerville, where Carr worked for a local manufacturing firm. He eventually rose to the position of sale's manager. The Carrs had two sons.

== Political career ==
Carr became involved in the Democratic party in the early 1920s. In 1929 he helped John J. Murphy get elected Mayor of Somerville. In 1940 he managed Francis E. Kelly's gubernatorial campaign in Somerville. He remained involved in Kelly's political organization and also served as chairman of Somerville's Ward 2 Democratic committee and as vice chairman of the Somerville Democratic committee.

On January 1, 1943, he was appointed to the Somerville board of assessors by mayor G. Edward Bradley. He remained on the board until 1962, when he resigned due to illness. He served as the board's chairman for six years.

In 1944, Carr ran for Lieutenant Governor of Massachusetts. He won the four-way contest for the Democratic nomination with 33% of the vote. Although he was a relative unknown in statewide politics, Carr did have a similar name to his party's 1942 lieutenant gubernatorial nominee, John C. Carr. John C. Carr chose to break with the party and endorse Republican Robert Bradford over John B. Carr in the general election. Carr lost the general election to Bradford 52% to 47%, though his running-mate Maurice Tobin won in his contest, causing the governor and lieutenant governor seats to be held by members of different parties from 1945 to 1947.

Carr ran for lieutenant governor a second time in 1946, but only received 7% of the vote in the Democratic primary.

In 1950, Carr was the Democratic nominee for the United States House of Representatives seat in Massachusetts's 8th congressional district. He lost to Republican incumbent Angier Goodwin 54% to 46%. Carr ran again in 1952, but was ruled off the ballot by the State Ballot Law Commission due to insufficient signatures. Carr alleged that this removal from the ballot occurred due to nepotism; he would have run in the primary against John C. Carr, Jr., the son of John C. Carr who served as the chairman of the state Democratic Committee. After the removal of J. B. Carr from the primary contest, J. C. Carr, Jr. was the only Democratic candidate for the 8th congressional seat; he later lost to Angier Goodwin in the general election.

Carr died on June 6, 1969, after a long illness. He was 68 years old.

Party political offices
Preceded by John C. Carr	Democratic nominee for Lieutenant Governor of Massachusetts; 1944	Succeeded by Paul A. Dever
