= Clarence A. Barnes =

American politician (1882-1970)

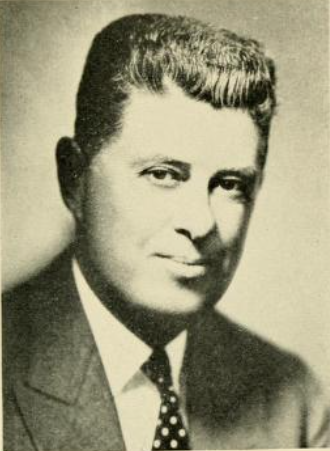

31st Attorney General of the Commonwealth of Massachusetts
- In office 1945–1949
- Governor: Maurice J. Tobin; Robert F. Bradford
- Preceded by: Robert T. Bushnell
- Succeeded by: Francis E. Kelly

Member of the Massachusetts Governor's Council for the 1st District
- In office 1943–1945
- Preceded by: Joseph P. Clark, Jr.
- Succeeded by: Joseph P. Clark, Jr.

Personal details
- Born: August 28, 1882 Brooklyn, New York, U.S.
- Died: May 26, 1970 (aged 87) Oak Bluffs, Massachusetts, U.S.
- Party: Republican
- Spouse(s): Helen V. Long (1906-1915); Doreen Kane (1927-1970)
- Children: Clare Barnes Jr. Jane Fenmore Barnes
- Education: Yale University; Yale Law School
- Profession: Lawyer

Clarence Alfred Barnes (August 28, 1882 – May 26, 1970) was an American politician who served as attorney general of Massachusetts from 1945 to 1949.

== Early life ==
Barnes attended Chauncey Hall School, Yale University, and Yale Law School. In 1904 he was captain of the Yale Bulldogs baseball team. He had four children with his first wife, Helen V. Long. His oldest son Clare Barnes Jr. was an advertising executive who published a best-selling series of picture books. In 1927, the 45-year-old Barnes married 18-year-old Doreen Kane.

From 1936 to 1940, Barnes was the president of the Boston Athletic Association, organizer of the Boston Marathon.

== Politics ==
Barnes' political career began in Mansfield, Massachusetts, where he served as town counsel and moderator of the Town meeting. From 1912 to 1913, he served as a state representative, and he was a delegate to the Massachusetts Constitutional Convention of 1917–18.

Barnes was the Republican nominee for attorney general in 1938 but lost to incumbent Paul A. Dever. He ran again in 1940, but lost the Republican nomination to Robert T. Bushnell. Barnes was a member of the Massachusetts Governor's Council from 1943 to 1944. In 1944, he defeated former Lieutenant Governor Francis E. Kelly to become attorney general. Barnes defeated Kelly again in 1946, but lost to him in 1948. He was a candidate for governor in 1950, but lost the nomination to Arthur W. Coolidge. Barnes was also a delegate to the Republican National Convention in 1940, 1944, 1948, and 1952.

Barnes died on May 26, 1970, at Martha's Vineyard Hospital in Oak Bluffs, Massachusetts.

Party political offices
Preceded by Felix Forte	Republican nominee for Attorney General of Massachusetts; 1938	Succeeded by Robert T. Bushnell
Preceded by Robert T. Bushnell	Republican nominee for Attorney General of Massachusetts; 1944, 1946, 1948	Succeeded by Frederick Ayer Jr.
Legal offices
Preceded by Robert T. Bushnell	Massachusetts Attorney General; 1945–1949	Succeeded by Francis E. Kelly
Sporting positions
Preceded by William F. Garcelon	President of the Boston Athletic Association; 1936–40	Succeeded by Walter A. Brown
