= Laurence Curtis =

American politician (1893–1989)

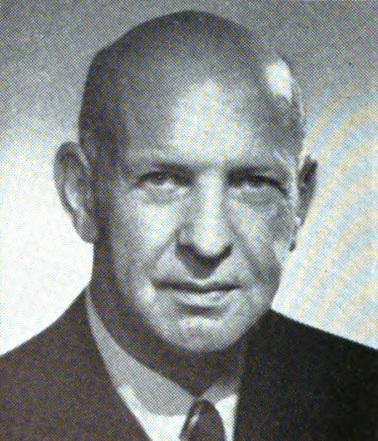
- Curtis c. 1961

Member of the U.S. House of Representatives from Massachusetts's 10th district
- In office January 3, 1953 – January 3, 1963
- Preceded by: Christian Herter
- Succeeded by: Joseph William Martin Jr. (redistricting)

Treasurer and Receiver-General of Massachusetts
- In office 1947–1949
- Governor: Robert F. Bradford
- Preceded by: John E. Hurley
- Succeeded by: John E. Hurley

Member of the Massachusetts Senate from the 3rd Suffolk District
- In office 1937–1941
- Preceded by: Henry Parkman Jr.
- Succeeded by: Charles John Innes

Member of the Massachusetts House of Representatives
- In office 1933–1937

Member of the Boston City Council for Ward 5
- In office 1930–1933
- Preceded by: Henry Parkman Jr.
- Succeeded by: Henry Lee Shattuck

Personal details
- Born: September 3, 1893 Boston, Massachusetts, U.S.
- Died: July 11, 1989 (aged 95) Boston, Massachusetts, U.S.
- Party: Republican
- Spouse: Helen
- Education: Harvard Law School; Harvard University
- Occupation: Lawyer
- Awards: Citation Star

Military service
- Allegiance: United States
- Branch/service: United States Navy

Laurence Curtis (September 3, 1893 – July 11, 1989) was an American attorney and Republican Party politician from Massachusetts.

== Early life, military service, and education ==
Laurence Curtis was born in Boston, Massachusetts on September 3, 1893. He graduated from Groton School in 1912 and from Harvard University in 1916.

=== Military career ===
He served in the Foreign Diplomatic Service. Upon graduation from college, he was commissioned as an officer in the Navy and was injured during an aviation training crash on a flying boat in Newport News, Virginia, resulting in the loss of a leg. He served out the rest of his time in the military in Pensacola, Florida. He was awarded the Citation Star. He was later State Commander and National Senior Vice Commander of the Disabled American Veterans.

He returned to Harvard Law School and graduated in 1921.

== Legal career ==
He was admitted to the Massachusetts bar the same year and commenced practice in Boston. He was secretary to United States Supreme Court Justice Oliver Wendell Holmes Jr. He served as assistant United States attorney in Boston

== Political career ==
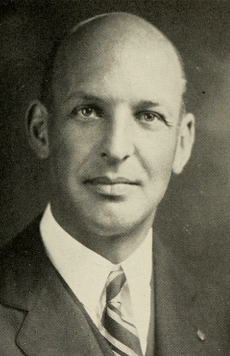
Curtis as a member of Massachusetts House circa 1935.

Curtis was elected to the Boston City Council in 1929. He succeeded Henry Parkman Jr. in the then-strongly Republican fifth ward, which includes the wealthy Back Bay and Beacon Hill neighborhoods. He represented the area in the Massachusetts House of Representatives from 1933 to 1937 and the Massachusetts Senate from 1937 to 1941.

In 1946, Curtis was elected Treasurer and Receiver-General of Massachusetts. He defeated former Treasurer Fred J. Burrell in the Republican primary and incumbent Treasurer John E. Hurley in the general election. However, Curtis lost re-election to Hurley in the historic wave election of 1948, when the Democratic Party swept all six state offices. Hurley sought a re-match and defeated Curtis by over 230,000 votes.

In 1950, Curtis was the Republican nominee for Lieutenant Governor of Massachusetts. He won the nomination relatively easily with 46% of the vote over a five-man field, including anti-communist activist Robert W. Welch Jr. and State Senator Harris S. Richardson. Though he was the leading Republican candidate on the ballot, Curtis lost the general election to incumbent Charles F. Sullivan as Republicans failed to erase the Democratic gains of 1948.

=== U.S. Representative ===
In 1952, Curtis initially sought election as Governor, calling for a "wholesale clean-up of conditions at the State House that have destroyed the hope of a square deal for Massachusetts citizens." However, U.S. Representative Christian Herter was drafted by the party establishment for the race instead. Curtis initially vowed to remain in the race before withdrawing, endorsing Herter, and running for Herter's House seat with party support.

Curtis was elected to the four succeeding Congresses. He voted in favor of the Civil Rights Acts of 1957 and 1960, but voted present on the 24th Amendment to the U.S. Constitution.

=== 1962 United States Senate campaign ===
In 1962, he declined to run for a sixth term in favor of seeking the United States Senate seat left vacant by John F. Kennedy's election to the White House. However, he lost the Republican nomination to George C. Lodge.

After his 1962 loss, Curtis resumed the practice of law. He unsuccessfully sought election to the House three more times in 1968, 1970, and 1972.

== Personal life and death ==
After he retired from office, Curtis was a resident of Newton, Massachusetts until his death in Boston on July 11, 1989. He was buried at Mount Auburn Cemetery.

== See also ==
- List of law clerks for the second seat of the Supreme Court of the United States
- Massachusetts legislature: 1933–1934, 1935–1936, 1937–1938, 1939, 1941–1942

Party political offices
| Preceded by William E. Hurley | Republican nominee for Treasurer and Receiver-General of Massachusetts; 1942 | Succeeded by Fred J. Burrell |
| Preceded by Fred J. Burrell | Republican nominee for Treasurer and Receiver-General of Massachusetts; 1946, 1948 | Succeeded by Fred J. Burrell |
| Preceded by Arthur W. Coolidge | Republican nominee for Lieutenant Governor of Massachusetts; 1950 | Succeeded by Sumner G. Whittier |
Political offices
| Preceded by John E. Hurley | Treasurer and Receiver-General of Massachusetts; January 1947 – January 1949 | Succeeded by John E. Hurley |
U.S. House of Representatives
| Preceded by Christian Herter | Member of the U.S. House of Representatives from Massachusetts's 10th congressional district January 3, 1953 – January 3, 1963 | Succeeded by Joseph William Martin Jr. |
