= Francis X. Hurley =

American politician (1903-1976)

Francis Xavier Hurley
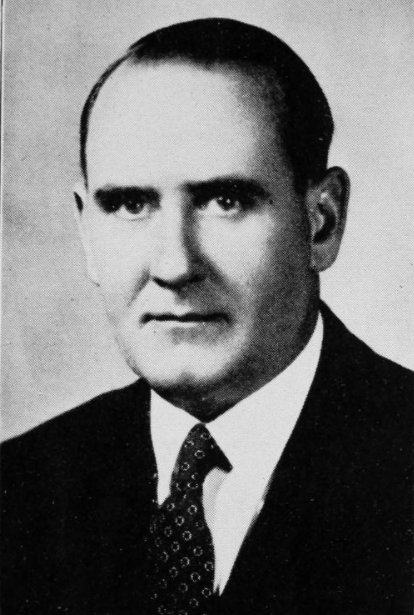

46th Treasurer and Receiver-General of Massachusetts
- In office 1943–1945
- Governor: Leverett Saltonstall
- Preceded by: William E. Hurley
- Succeeded by: John E. Hurley

17th Massachusetts Auditor
- In office 1931–1934
- Governor: Joseph B. Ely
- Preceded by: Alonzo B. Cook
- Succeeded by: Thomas H. Buckley

Personal details
- Born: February 11, 1903 Cambridge, Massachusetts, US
- Died: April 1976 (aged 73)
- Party: Democratic
- Education: Harvard College; Harvard Law School

Francis Xavier Hurley (February 11, 1903 – April 1976) was an American politician who served as the 17th Massachusetts State Auditor and the 46th Treasurer and Receiver-General of Massachusetts. He was a 1924 graduate of Harvard College. Hurley was elected state auditor at the age of 27, making him the youngest person ever elected to statewide office in Massachusetts. He is known for a 1933 report alleging misconduct by the superintendent of Norfolk Prison Colony, now called Massachusetts Correctional Institution – Norfolk.

Party political offices
Preceded by Francis J. O'Gorman	Democratic nominee for Auditor of Massachusetts; 1930, 1932	Succeeded by Thomas H. Buckley
Preceded by John J. Donahue	Democratic nominee for Treasurer and Receiver-General of Massachusetts; 1942	Succeeded by John E. Hurley
Political offices
Preceded by Alonzo B. Cook	17th Massachusetts Auditor; 1931–1935	Succeeded by Thomas H. Buckley
Preceded by William E. Hurley	46th Treasurer and Receiver-General of Massachusetts; 1943–1945	Succeeded by John E. Hurley
