= Thomas J. Buckley =

American politician (1895-1964)

18th Massachusetts Auditor
- In office 1941 – September 9, 1964
- Governor: Leverett Saltonstall; Maurice J. Tobin; Robert F. Bradford; Paul A. Dever; Christian A. Herter; Foster Furcolo; John Volpe; Endicott Peabody
- Preceded by: Russell A. Wood
- Succeeded by: Thaddeus M. Buczko

Personal details
- Born: February 3, 1895 East Boston, Massachusetts, U.S.
- Died: September 9, 1964 (aged 69)
- Party: Democratic

Thomas J. Buckley (February 3, 1895 – September 9, 1964) was an American politician who served as Massachusetts Auditor from 1941 to 1964.

== Biography ==
Prior to becoming state auditor, Buckley was an auditor for the Rug-O-Vator Company and a former WPA bookkeeper. He had never held public office and his victory was believed to be helped by voters who confused him with former state auditor Thomas H. Buckley, to whom he was not related.

Buckley died of a heart attack. on the day before the 1964 primary election.

== Bibliography ==
- Hayden, Irving N. 1955–1956 Public officers of the Commonwealth of Massachusetts, p. 27, (1955).
- Hayden, Irving N. 1961–1962 Public officers of the Commonwealth of Massachusetts, p. 27, (1961).

Party political offices
Preceded by Thomas H. Buckley	Democratic nominee for Auditor of Massachusetts; 1940, 1942, 1944, 1946, 1948, 1950, 1952, 1954, 1956, 1958, 1960, 1962	Succeeded by Thaddeus M. Buczko
Political offices
Preceded by Russell A. Wood	18th Massachusetts Auditor; 1941 – September 10, 1964	Succeeded by Thaddeus M. Buczko
