= John E. Hurley =

American politician (1906-1992)

Treasurer and Receiver-General of Massachusetts
- In office 1945–1947
- Governor: Maurice J. Tobin
- Preceded by: Francis X. Hurley
- Succeeded by: Laurence Curtis

Treasurer and Receiver-General of Massachusetts
- In office 1949–1952
- Governor: Paul A. Dever
- Preceded by: Laurence Curtis
- Succeeded by: Foster Furcolo

Member of the Massachusetts House of Representatives Suffolk District
- In office 1931–1934

Personal details
- Born: November 2, 1906 Dorchester, Massachusetts
- Died: September 22, 1992 (aged 85) Milton, Massachusetts
- Resting place: Mount Benedict Cemetery, West Roxbury, Massachusetts
- Party: Democratic
- Spouse(s): Margaret M. Lee, d. February 12, 1986
- Children: Janice L. Hurley, John E. Hurley, Jr.
- Education: Boston College

John E. Hurley (November 3, 1906 – September 22, 1992) was an American politician who served as a Massachusetts State Representative, and the Treasurer and Receiver-General of Massachusetts.

== Early life and education ==
Hurley was born on Buttonwood Street in the Boston neighborhood of Dorchester. Hurley attended St. Margaret's Grammar School in Boston, he was a 1926 graduate of Boston College High School, and a 1930 graduate of Boston College.

== Family ==
Hurley married Margaret M. Lee of Dorchester, Massachusetts. The couple had two children: a daughter, Janice L. Hurley, and a son, John E. Hurley, Jr.

== Political career ==
=== Massachusetts House of Representatives ===
After his graduation from Boston College in 1930, Hurley ran for the Massachusetts House of Representatives. At the age of 21, Hurley was elected to represent Boston's Ward 16 in the legislature, serving from 1931 to 1935.

=== Executive Secretary to Massachusetts Attorney General Paul Dever ===
When in 1934 fellow representative Paul Dever was elected Massachusetts Attorney General, Hurley became his executive secretary.

=== Treasurer of Massachusetts ===
Hurley was elected Massachusetts Treasurer in 1944 and he served from 1945 to 1947.

Hurley was again elected Treasurer in the 1948 election, and served from 1949 until his resignation in 1952.

In 1952 Hurley had been running for reelection, but Governor Dever appointed Hurley clerk of the Boston Municipal Court. Hurley resigned as State Treasurer and Governor Dever then appointed Foster Furcolo to the office. Hurley served as clerk of the Boston Municipal Court until he retired in 1976.

== Death and burial ==
After a brief illness Hurley died in Milton Hospital, Milton, Massachusetts and was interred in Mount Benedict Cemetery, West Roxbury, Massachusetts.

== See also ==
- 1931–1932 Massachusetts legislature
- 1933–1934 Massachusetts legislature

Party political offices
Preceded by Francis X. Hurley	Democratic nominee for Treasurer and Receiver-General of Massachusetts; 1944, 1946, 1948, 1950	Succeeded by Foster Furcolo
Political offices
Preceded by Francis X. Hurley	Treasurer and Receiver-General of Massachusetts; 1945–1947	Succeeded by Laurence Curtis
Preceded by Laurence Curtis	Treasurer and Receiver-General of Massachusetts; 1949–1952	Succeeded by Foster Furcolo
