= Treasurer and Receiver-General of Massachusetts =

Chief financial officer for the U.S. state of Massachusetts

Treasurer and Receiver-General of the Commonwealth of Massachusetts
- Seal of Massachusetts

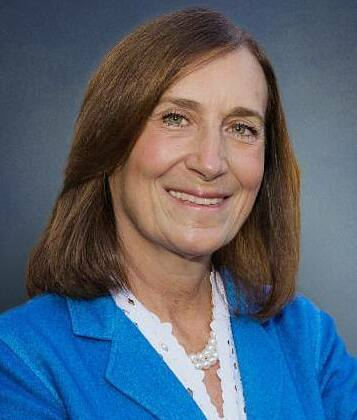
- Incumbent; Deb Goldberg since January 21, 2015
- Government of Massachusetts
- Style: Mister or Madam Treasurer (informal); The Honorable (formal)
- Type: Constitutional officer State treasurer
- Residence: None official
- Seat: State House, Boston, Massachusetts
- Nominator: Nominating petition, Political parties
- Appointer: Popular vote
- Term length: Four years, no term limit
- Constituting instrument: Constitution of Massachusetts
- Formation: Originally created: May 18, 1629; Current form: October 25, 1780
- Succession: Fourth
- Unofficial names: State Treasurer
- Website: www.mass.gov/treasury

The treasurer and receiver-general of Massachusetts is an elected constitutional officer in the executive branch of the U.S. state of Massachusetts. Originally appointed under authority of the English Crown pursuant to the Charter of the Massachusetts Bay Company, the office of treasurer and receiver-general (commonly called the "state treasurer") became an elective one in 1780. (Note: Massachusett's Office of the Treasurer and Receiver-General is therefore the oldest operating state treasurer's office in the United States.) Sixty-one individuals have occupied the office of state treasurer over the ensuing centuries. The incumbent is Deb Goldberg, a Democrat who took office January 21, 2015.

== Election ==
=== Term of office ===
The treasurer is elected by the people on Election Day in November to four-year terms, and takes office on the third Wednesday of the January following a general election. There is no limit to the number of terms a treasurer may hold. Institutionally speaking, the treasurer is thus independent of both the governor and General Court for the purpose of performing their official duties. These constitutional protections notwithstanding, the treasurer may still be impeached for misconduct or maladministration by the House of Representatives and, if found guilty, removed from office by the Senate.

=== Qualifications ===
Any person seeking election to the office of treasurer must meet the following requirements:

1. Be at least eighteen years of age;
2. Be a registered voter in Massachusetts;
3. Be a Massachusetts resident for at least five years when elected; and
4. Receive 5,000 signatures from registered voters on nomination papers.

=== Vacancies ===
In the event of a vacancy in the office of treasurer, the General Court is charged, if in session, with electing from among the eligible citizens of the Commonwealth a successor to serve the balance of the prior treasurer's term in office. (Note: Citizens of the Commonwealth of the Massachusetts are officially designated as "Bay Staters". Being a Bay Stater implies concurrent U.S. citizenship, which is required in order to vote in Massachusetts and to run for any public office, including that of treasurer and receiver-general.) If, however, the vacancy occurs while the General Court is not in session, then responsibility for appointing a successor falls to the governor. The appointment is not valid without the advice and consent of the Governor's Council.

== Powers and duties ==
The state treasurer is in effect the chief financial officer for the Commonwealth of Massachusetts. As such, the state treasurer manages the Commonwealth's cash flows and invests the working capital of state agencies and local governments. The state treasurer is also responsible for issueing, registering, and servicing the Commonwealth's public debt along with administering escheats and unclaimed property that accrue to the Commonwealth. These are core functions shared with other state treasurers.

Other programs have been assigned to the state treasurer by law. For example, the state treasurer regulates the sale of alcoholic beverages within intrastate commerce, provides tax-advantaged ABLE and college savings programs to Bay Stater residents, and manages the state lottery. Likewise, the state treasurer administers deferred compensation plans to public and nonprofit employees along with bonuses to veterans, servicemembers, and military families domiciled in Massachusetts.

Aside from these functional responsibilities, the state treasurer is ex officio chair of the Massachusetts Clean Water Trust, the Massachusetts School Building Authority, the Massachusetts State Retirement Board, and the Pension Reserves Investment Management Board. These independent agencies are governed by multimember boards attached to the Office of the Treasurer and Receiver-General for administrative purposes.

== Organization ==
The Office of the Treasurer and Receiver-General is organized into the following departments:

1. the Alcoholic Beverages Control Commission;
2. the Department of Cash Management;
3. the Department of Debt Management;
4. the Department of Defined Compensation Plans;
5. the Massachusetts Clean Water Trust;
6. the Massachusetts School Building Authority;
7. the Massachusetts State Lottery;
8. the Office of Economic Empowerment;
9. the Pension Reserves Investment Management Board;
10. the State Retirement Board;
11. the Unclaimed Property Division; and
12. the Veterans' Bonus Division.

== List of treasurers and receivers-general (1780–present) ==
Treasurer and Receiver-General	Party	Years
Henry Gardner Sr.		1780– 1783
Thomas Ivers		1783– 1787
Alexander Hodgden		1787– 1792
Thomas Davis		1792– 1797
Peleg Coffin Jr.	Federalist	1797– 1801
Jonathan Jackson	Federalist	1802– 1806
Thomson J. Skinner	Democratic- Republican	1806– 1808
Josiah Dwight		1808– 1810
Thomas Harris		1810– 1811
Jonathan L. Austin	Democratic- Republican	1811– 1812
John T. Apthorp		1812– 1817
Daniel Sargent		1817– 1822
Nahum Mitchell	Federalist	1822– 1827
Joseph Sewall		1827– 1832
Hezekiah Barnard		1832– 1837
David Wilder Jr.	Whig	1837– 1842
Thomas Russell		1842– 1843
John Mills		1843– 1844
Thomas Russell		1844– 1845
Joseph Barrett		1845– 1849
Ebenezer Bradbury	Whig	1849– 1851
Charles B. Hall		1851– 1853
Jacob H. Loud		1853– 1855
Thomas J. Marsh		1855– 1856
Moses Tenney Jr.	Opposition	1856– 1861
Henry Kemble Oliver	Republican	1861– 1866
Jacob H. Loud	Republican	1866– 1871
Charles Adams, Jr.	Republican	1871– 1876
Charles Endicott	Republican	1876– 1881
Daniel A. Gleason	Republican	1881– 1886
Alanson W. Beard	Republican	1886– 1889
George A. Marden	Republican	1889– 1894
Henry M. Phillips	Republican	1894– April 12, 1895
Edward P. Shaw	Republican	April 25, 1895– 1900
Edward S. Bradford	Republican	1900–1905
Arthur Chapin	Republican	1905– April 1, 1909
Elmer A. Stevens	Republican	April 7, 1909– 1914
Frederick Mansfield	Democratic	1914– 1915
Charles L. Burrill	Republican	1915– 1920
Fred J. Burrell	Republican	1920– September 3, 1920
Albert P. Langtry (Acting); Henry A. Wyman (Acting); John R. Macomber (Acting)	Republican	September 4, 1920– September 8, 1920
James Jackson	Republican	September 8, 1920– 1924
William S. Youngman	Republican	1924– 1928
John W. Haigis	Republican	1928– 1930
Charles F. Hurley	Democratic	1931– 1937
Karl H. Oliver		1937
William E. Hurley	Republican	1937– 1943
Francis X. Hurley	Democratic	1943– 1945
John E. Hurley	Democratic	1945– 1947
Laurence Curtis	Republican	1947– 1949
John E. Hurley	Democratic	1949– July 5, 1952
Foster Furcolo	Democratic	July 5, 1952– 1955
John Francis Kennedy	Democratic	1955– 1961
John T. Driscoll	Democratic	1961– 1964
Robert Q. Crane	Democratic	1964– 1991
Joe Malone	Republican	January 3, 1991– January 7, 1999
Shannon O'Brien	Democratic	January 7, 1999– January 2, 2003
Tim Cahill	Democratic	January 2, 2003– July 2009
Tim Cahill	Independent	July 2009– January 3, 2011
Steve Grossman	Democratic	January 17, 2011– January 21, 2015
Deb Goldberg	Democratic	January 21, 2015– present

== See also ==
- Government budget
