= William McMasters =

American novelist

William Henry McMasters (June 9, 1874 – February 28, 1968) was an American journalist and publicist who exposed Charles Ponzi as a fraudster.

== Early life ==
McMasters was born on June 9, 1874, in Franklin, Massachusetts. His parents, William and Jane McMasters immigrated to the United States from Ireland in 1868. He attended the Dean Academy and Boston University School of Law. In 1898 he volunteered for the United States Army Signal Corps and served in Cuba during the Spanish–American War. McMasters married Lillian Goulston and they had one daughter.

== Journalism and campaign work ==
In 1902, McMasters became a reporter for the Providence Telegram. He later worked for The Boston Post, Boston Herald, and Boston American. McMaster left journalism to become a freelance writer and publicist. He worked for the mayoral campaigns of John F. Fitzgerald and James Michael Curley and Calvin Coolidge's 1918 gubernatorial campaign.

== Ponzi ==
On July 23, 1920, Charles Ponzi hired McMasters as a publicist on the advice of his attorney Frank J. Leveroni. McMasters quickly became suspicious of Ponzi's claims regarding his postal reply coupons. He later described Ponzi as a "financial idiot" who did not seem to know how to add. In late July, McMasters found several highly incriminating documents that indicated Ponzi was merely robbing Peter to pay Paul. He went to his former employer, Boston Post publisher Richard Grozier, with this information. Grozier offered him $5,000 for his story, which was printed in the Post on August 2, 1920. McMaster's article declared Ponzi "hopelessly insolvent", reporting that he was at least $2 million in debt. McMasters later sued Ponzi for failure to pay for services rendered. In a directed verdict, Judge Michael Keating ruled that McMasters was not entitled to the money because he was serving two masters and ordered the jury to find in favor of Ponzi. McMasters was ordered to pay Ponzi back $907.50.

== Curley administration ==
In 1922, Curley appointed McMasters co-director of the newly-created Commercial and Industrial Bureau. McMasters tenure in the Curley administration was short-lived, as in June 1923 Curley disbanded the bureau.

== Writing ==
McMasters was the author of Originality and Other Essays, and Somewhere in Eternity. He also wrote three plays, The Undercurrent, Opportunity Knox and Triangle. The Undercurrent, a three-act play about a cruel mine owner who is transformed after a bump to the head causes him to dream that he was one of his mine workers, was performed on Broadway in 1925. It ran at the Cort Theatre and starred Harry Beresford, Lee Patrick, and Frank Shannon. The Undercurrent was described by New York Times theater critic Stark Young as "one of those little islands in dramatic seas that keep no contact with the mainland or with the currents of voyages and are untouched by the life and progress of the rest of the world around them...in the course of affairs we are given some of Grumpy and the Old Soak, some new social thought on capital labor, some of a good many theatrical pickings here and there". McMasters' first novel, Revolt, was published in 1935.

== Runs for office ==
McMasters was the Union Party's nominee in the 1936 Massachusetts gubernatorial election. He received 4% of the vote, finishing third behind Democrat Charles F. Hurley and Republican John W. Haigis. In the 1938 Massachusetts gubernatorial election, McMasters lost the Republican primary to Leverett Saltonstall and received 7,206 votes in the general election as an independent on the Townsend Recovery Act line. In the 1940 Massachusetts gubernatorial election, McMasters attempted to run as the nominee of the National Pensions Party, however the Massachusetts Ballot Law Commission ruled that he did not file the required amount of "legally-good signatures". Four of his campaign workers were convicted of conspiracy to violate the state election laws for forging names on McMasters' nomination papers. McMasters was an unsuccessful candidate for the Republican nomination for Lieutenant Governor of Massachusetts in the 1944 election.

== Later life and death ==
McMasters taught journalism at Mount Ida College from 1947 to 1957. He died on February 28, 1968, at his home in Cambridge, Massachusetts. He was 93 years old. He was buried in Mount Auburn Cemetery.
