= Leveroni =

Leveroni is a surname. Notable people with the surname include:

- Frank J. Leveroni (1879–1948), Italian-American jurist
- Rosa Leveroni (1910–1985), Catalan poet and narrator
