= 1940 Republican National Convention =

American political convention

- 1940 presidential election
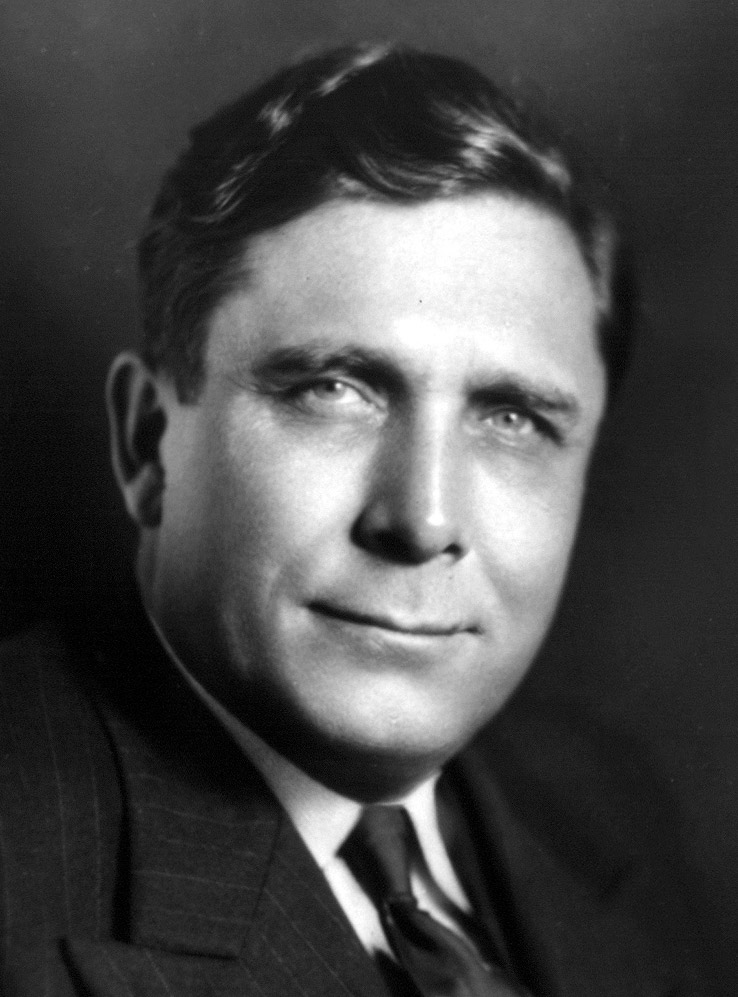
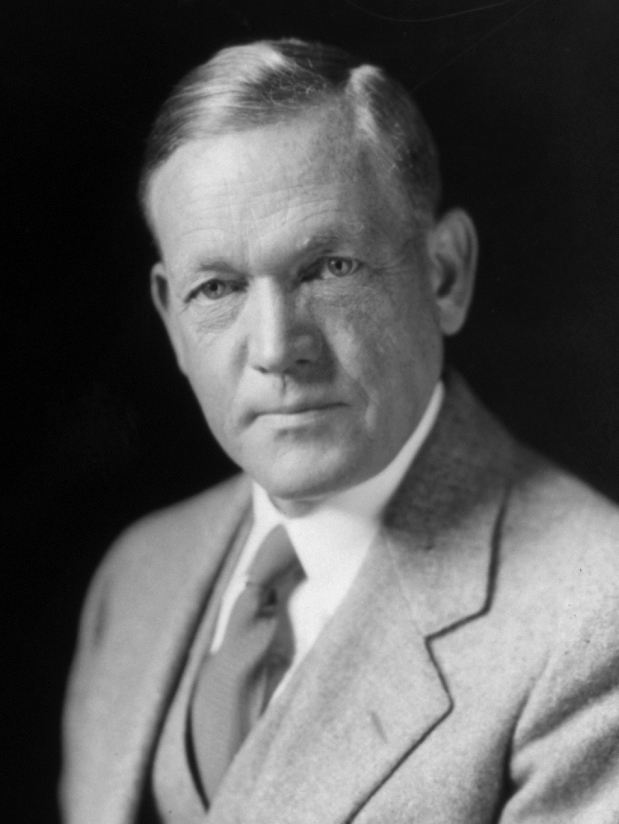
- Nominees; Willkie and McNary

Convention
- Dates: June 24–28, 1940
- City: Philadelphia, Pennsylvania
- Venue: Philadelphia Convention Hall

Candidates
- Presidential nominee: Wendell Willkie of New York
- Vice-presidential nominee: Charles L. McNary of Oregon
- Ballots: 6

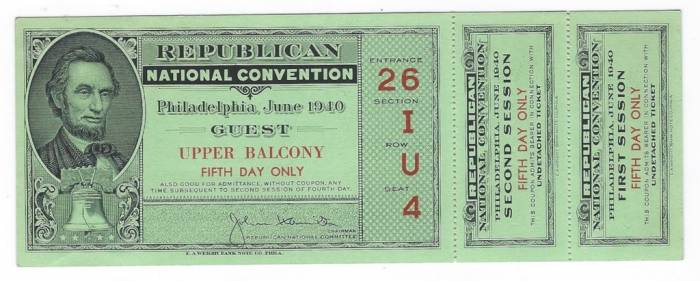
Entrance ticket, featuring illustrations of historic Republican president Abraham Lincoln and Philadelphia's landmark Liberty Bell

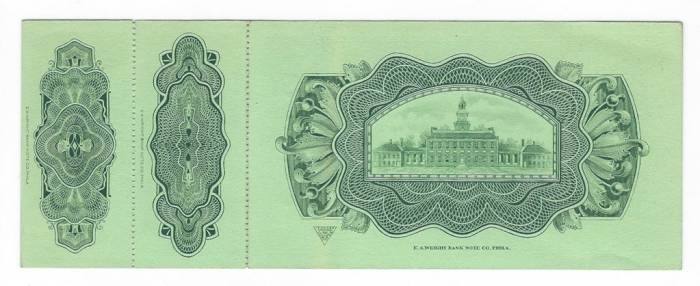
Backside of entrance ticket, featuring an illustration of Philadelphia City Hall

The 1940 Republican National Convention was held in Philadelphia, Pennsylvania, United States, from June 24 to June 28, 1940. It nominated Wendell Willkie of New York for president and Senator Charles McNary of Oregon for vice president.

The contest for the 1940 Republican presidential nomination was wide-open. Front-runners included Senator Arthur H. Vandenberg of Michigan, Senator Robert Taft of Ohio and Manhattan District Attorney Thomas E. Dewey.

== Background ==
=== 1940 Republican primaries ===
Prior to reforms during the 1970s, most convention delegates were not elected directly through primaries and those primaries that were held were often uncontested. Other delegates were elected via party convention or local district primaries. Many of the delegates were elected to the convention without a formal or informal pledge to support any particular candidate. Three candidates openly competed for delegate support during the primary season: Manhattan District Attorney Thomas Dewey, Ohio Senator Robert A. Taft, and Michigan Senator Arthur Vandenberg. Only 300 of the 1,000 convention delegates had been pledged to a candidate by the time the convention opened.

Other candidates who were known to be willing to accept the nomination or actively seeking the nomination without being placed on the ballot in a primary included former President Herbert Hoover, businessman Wendell Willkie, Pennsylvania Governor Arthur James, New Hampshire Senator Styles Bridges, and newspaper publisher Frank Gannett.

A Willkie boom developed in the later stages of the campaign.

Delegate selections were completed by June 16, one week ahead of the convention.

=== Foreign developments ===
Although the German invasion of Poland had occurred in fall of the year prior, many Americans were ambivalent to the events in Europe or outright opposed to American involvement. However, the Germans' May 1940 invasion of France may have affected delegates' perceptions of the potential nominees. Those candidates who had actively campaigned for the nomination, especially Dewey and Vandenberg, emphasized their opposition to military involvement in Europe at a time when most Republicans opposed intervention.

The German offensive may have also hurt Dewey's standing in particular. He was only 38 years old and foreign policy was considered his greatest weakness, as he had never held any national office.

The convention opened in Philadelphia just two days after France surrendered on June 22.

=== Roosevelt nomination ===
The campaign for the nomination began with no one certain whether President Franklin D. Roosevelt would seek an unprecedented third term in office. However, by the time the convention opened, Roosevelt was the clear Democratic nominee.

== Presidential nomination ==
=== Presidential candidates ===
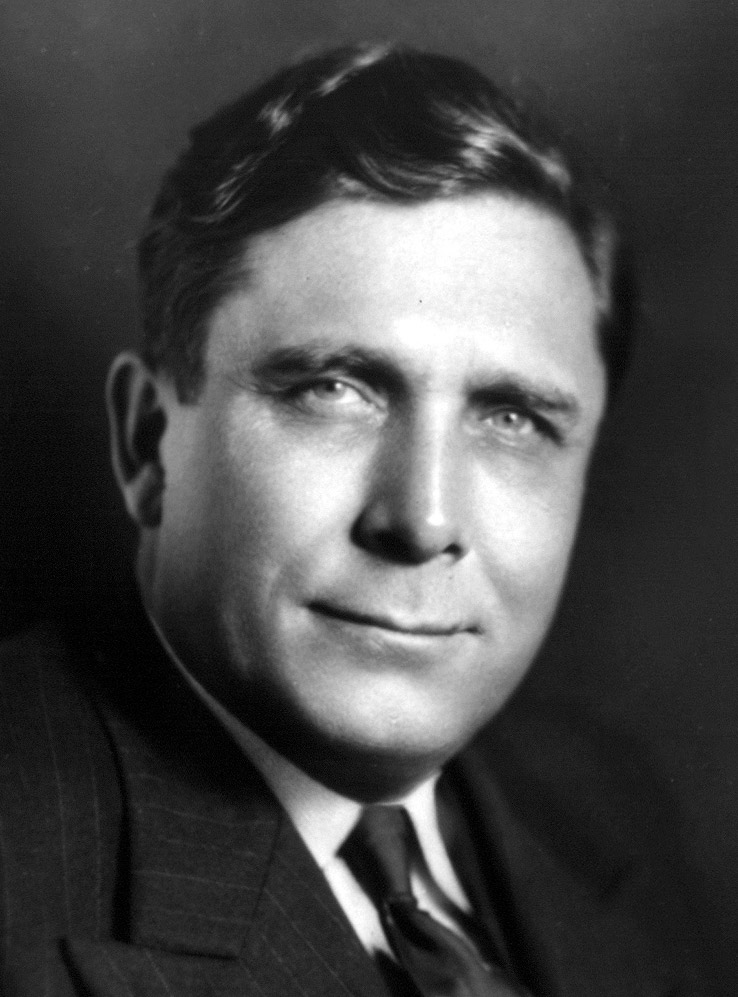
Corporate Lawyer
Wendell Willkie
of Indiana

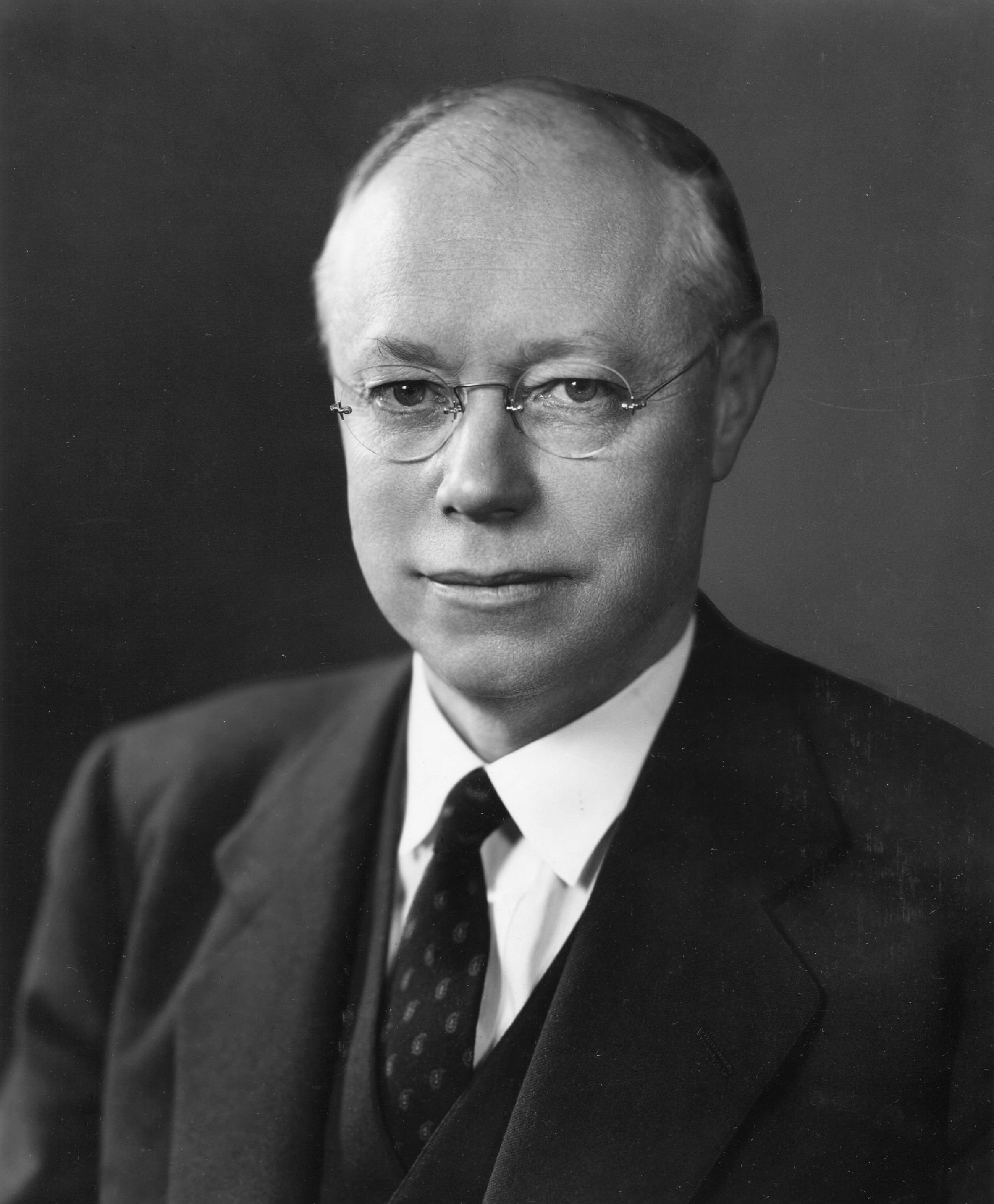
Senator
Robert A. Taft
of Ohio

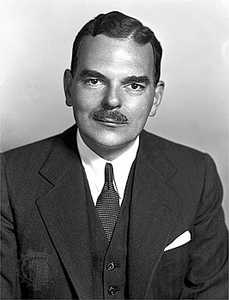
Manhattan D.A.
Thomas E. Dewey
of New York

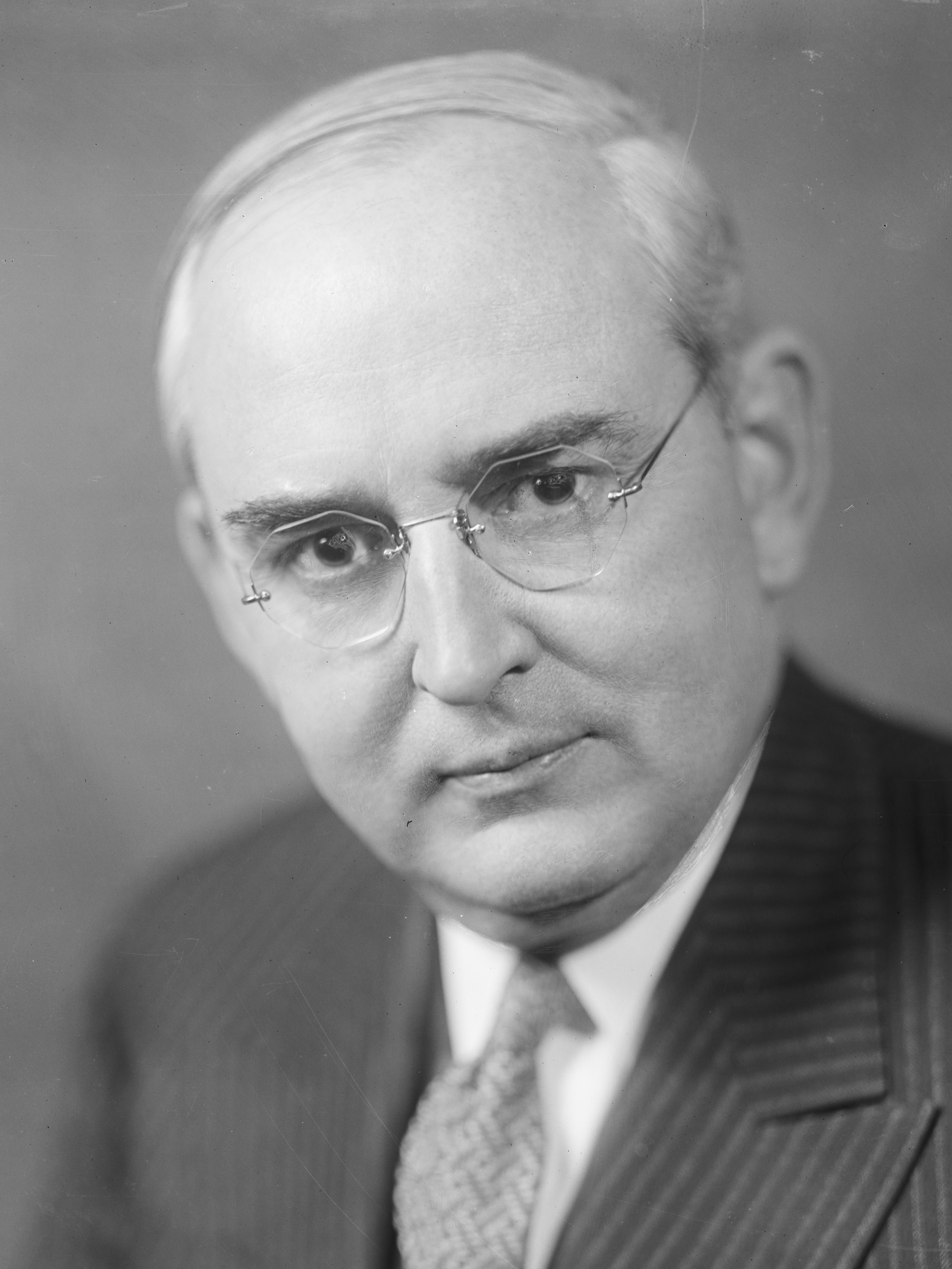
Senator
Arthur Vandenberg
of Michigan

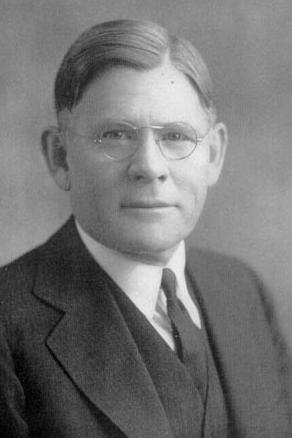
Governor
Arthur James
of Pennsylvania

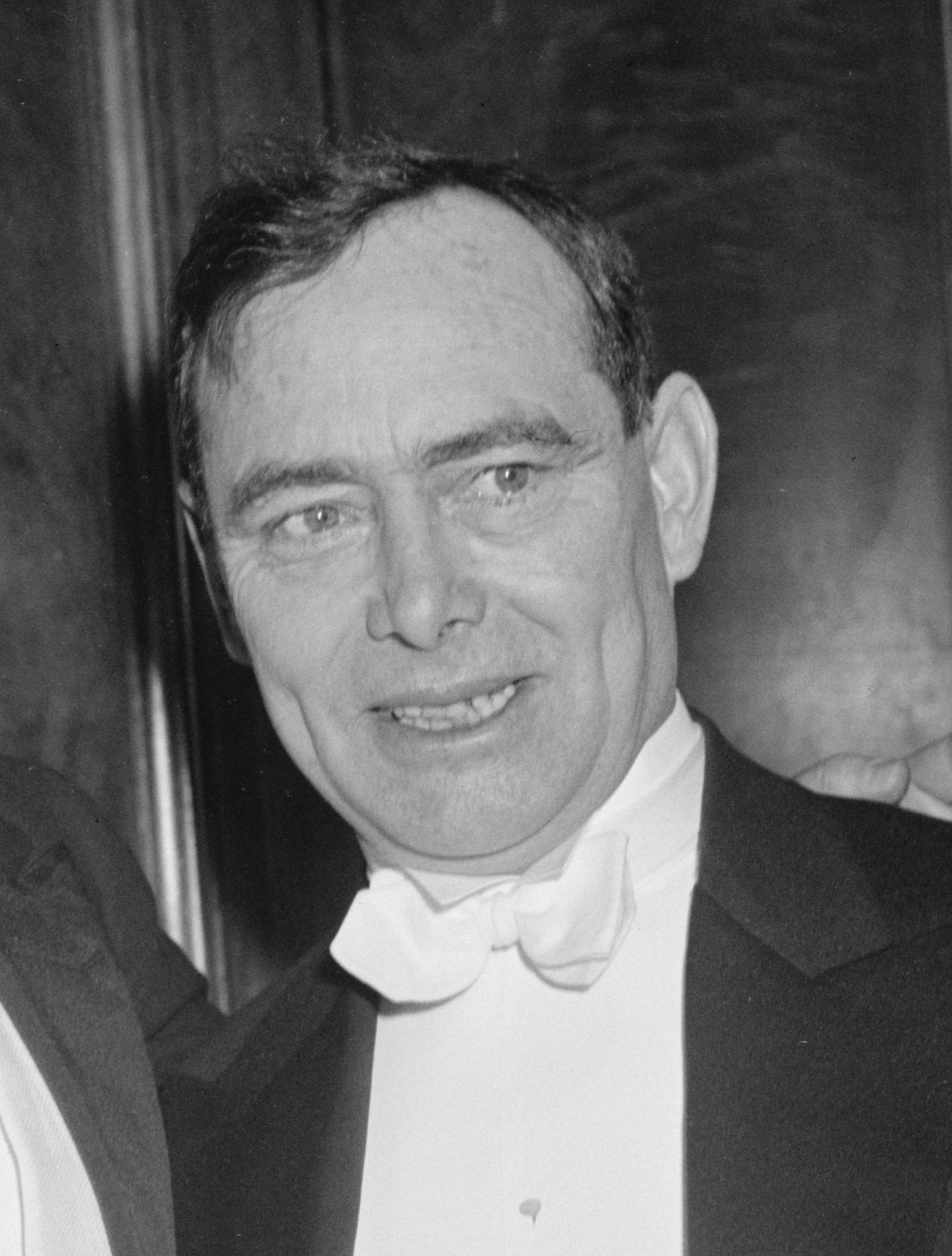
House Minority Leader
Joseph W. Martin Jr.
of Massachusetts
(not nominated)

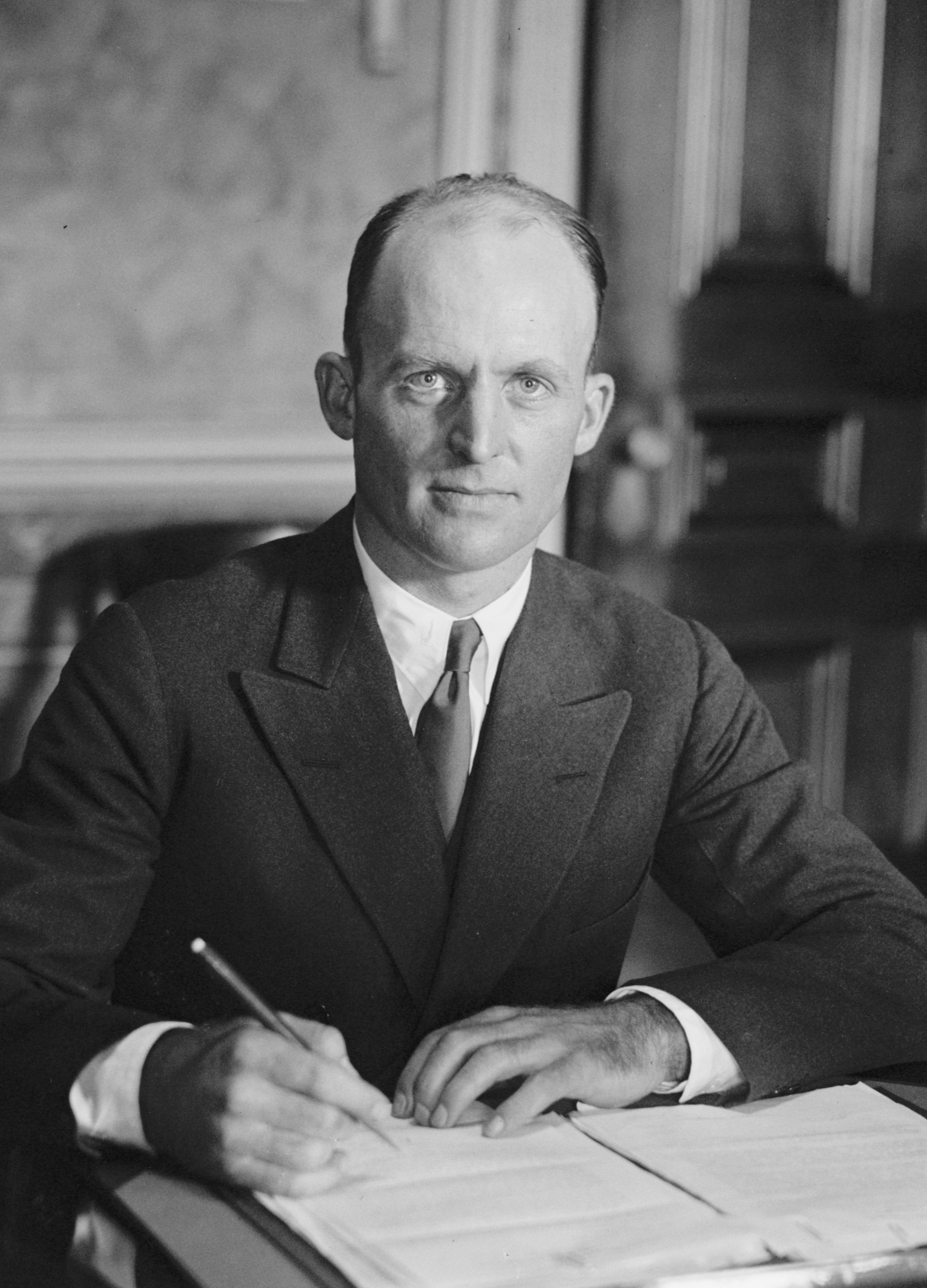
Former Ambassador
Hanford MacNider
of Iowa

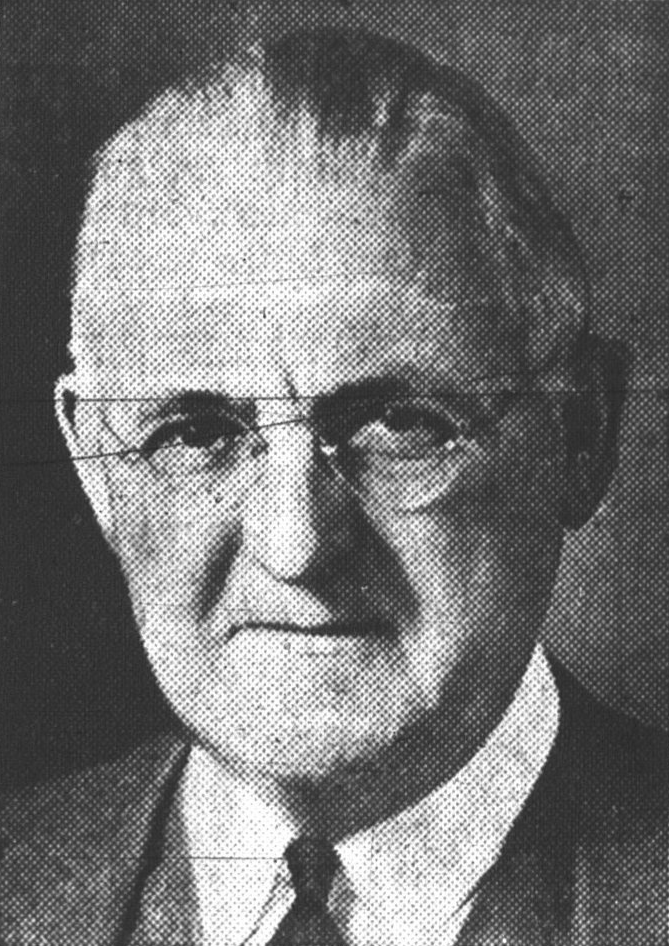
Publisher
Frank Gannett
of New York

Former President
Herbert Hoover
of California
(not nominated)

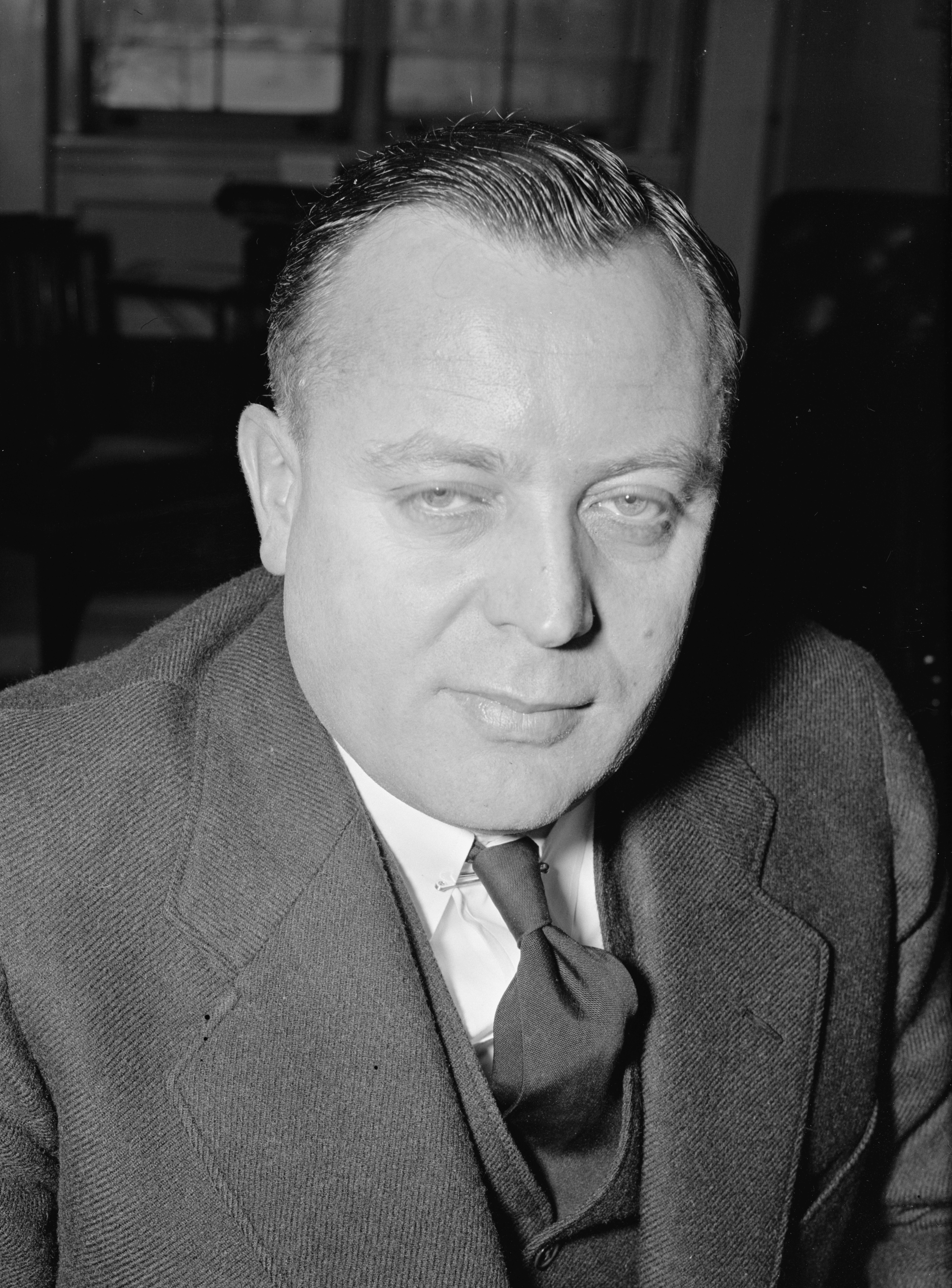
Senator
Styles Bridges
of New Hampshire

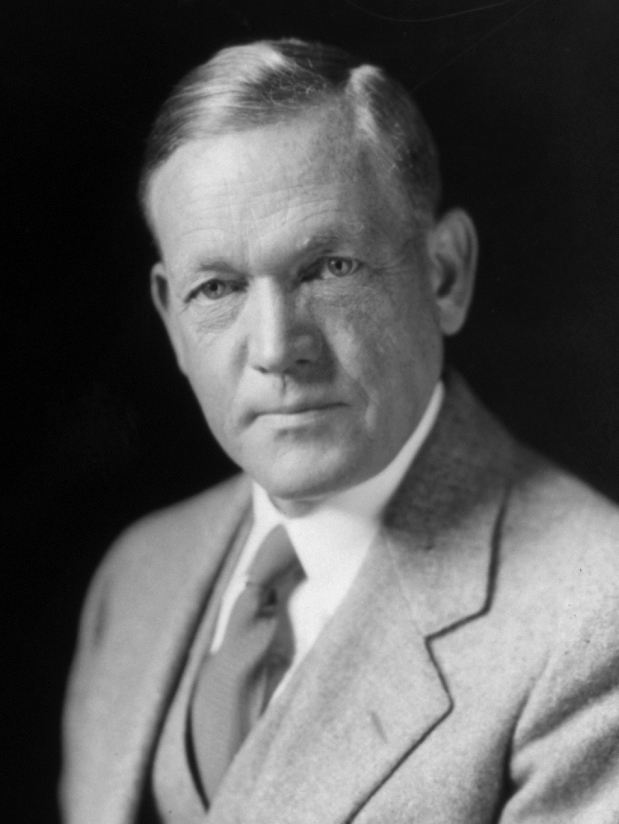
Senate Minority Leader
Charles L. McNary
of Oregon

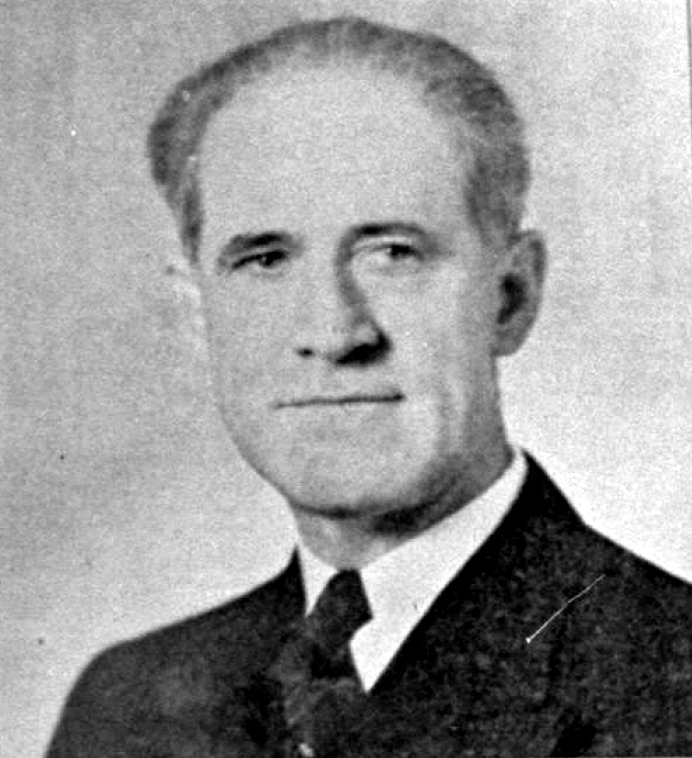
Governor
Harlan J. Bushfield
of South Dakota

At the 1940 Republican National Convention itself, ten names were placed in nomination. Keynote speaker Harold E. Stassen, the Governor of Minnesota, announced his "tacit" support for Willkie and became his official floor manager. Though he had delegates that voted for him through a number of ballots, Stassen did not seek to gain delegates either. (Note: Stassen would have been 33 on Election Day in 1940, two years below the Constitutional minimum age of 35 for a president.) Hundreds of vocal Willkie supporters packed the upper galleries of the convention hall. Willkie's amateur status and his fresh face appealed to delegates as well as voters. The delegations were selected not by primaries but by party leaders in each state, and they had a keen sense of the fast-changing pulse of public opinion. Gallup found the same thing in polling data not reported until after the convention: Willkie had moved ahead among Republican voters by 44% to only 29% for the collapsing Dewey.

As the pro-Willkie galleries repeatedly chanted "We Want Willkie!", the delegates on the convention floor began their vote. Dewey led on the first ballot but steadily lost strength thereafter. Both Taft and Willkie gained in strength on each ballot, and by the fourth ballot it was obvious that either Willkie or Taft would be the nominee. The key moments came when the delegations of large states such as Michigan, Pennsylvania, and New York left Dewey and Vandenberg and switched to Willkie, giving him the victory on the sixth ballot.The voting went like this:

Presidential ballot
Ballot	1st	2nd	3rd	4th	5th	6th (before shifts)	6th (after shifts)
Willkie	105	171	259	306	429	655	998
Taft	189	203	212	254	377	318	0
Dewey	360	338	315	250	57	11	0
Vandenberg	76	73	72	61	42	0	0
James	74	66	59	56	59	1	0
Martin	44	26	0	0	0	0	0
MacNider	34	34	28	26	4	1	0
Gannett	33	30	11	4	1	1	0
Hoover	17	21	32	31	20	9	0
Bridges	28	9	1	1	0	0	0
Capper	18	18	0	0	0	0	0
McNary	13	10	10	8	9	0	0
Bushfield	9	0	0	0	0	0	0
La Guardia	0	1	0	0	0	0	0
Not voting	0	0	1	3	2	4	2

Presidential balloting / 4th day of convention (June 27, 1940)

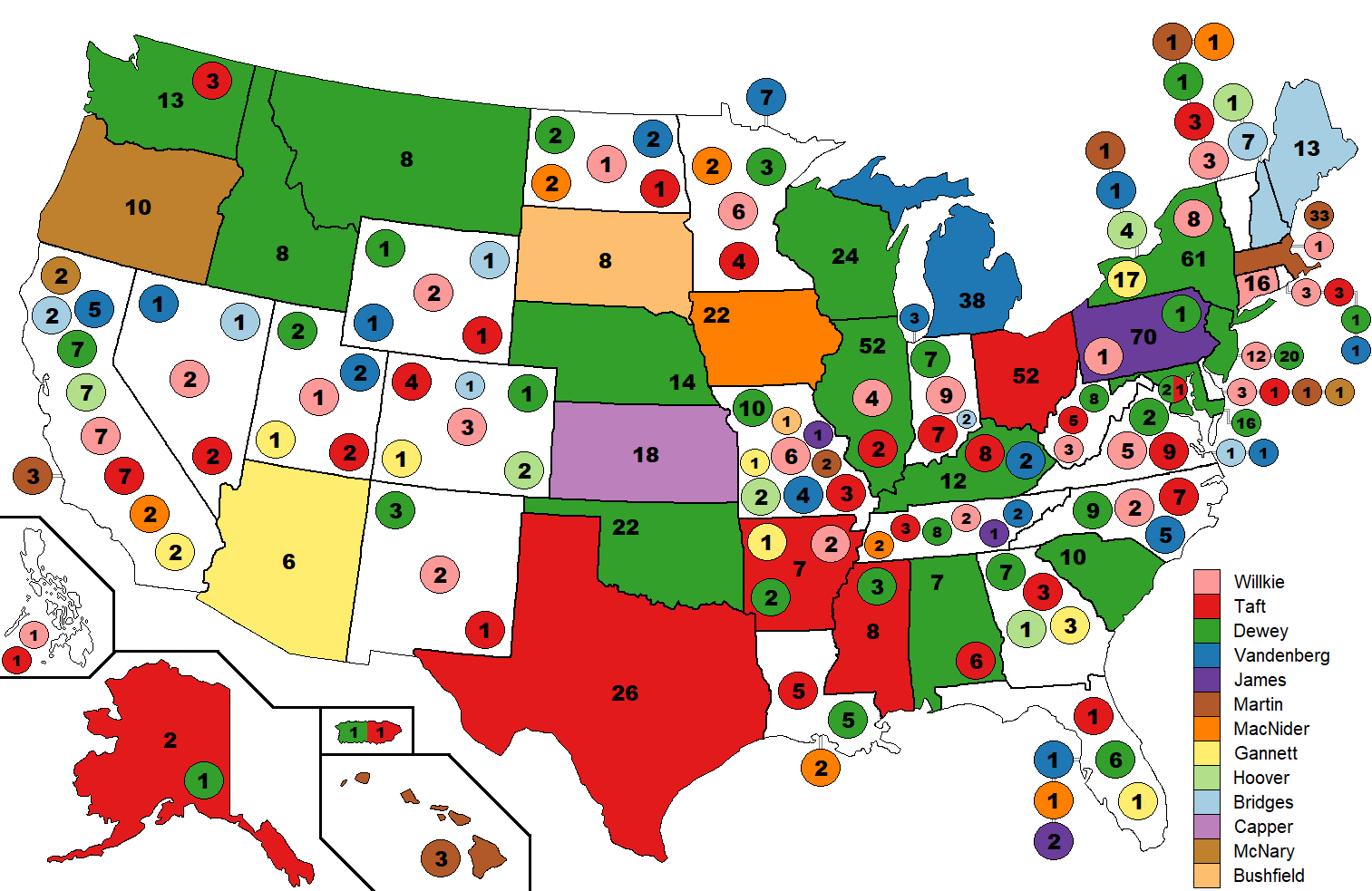
1st presidential ballot

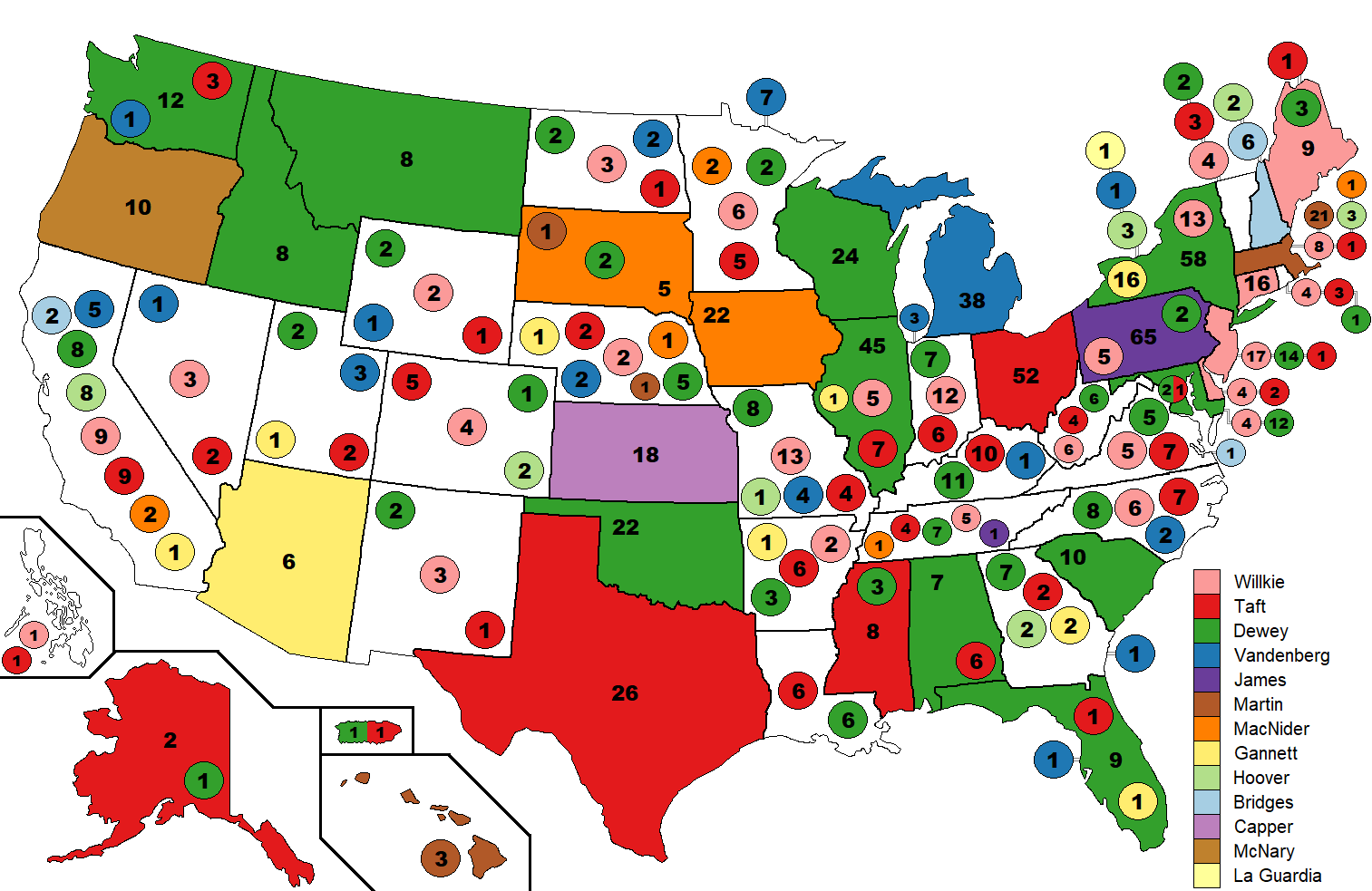
2nd presidential ballot

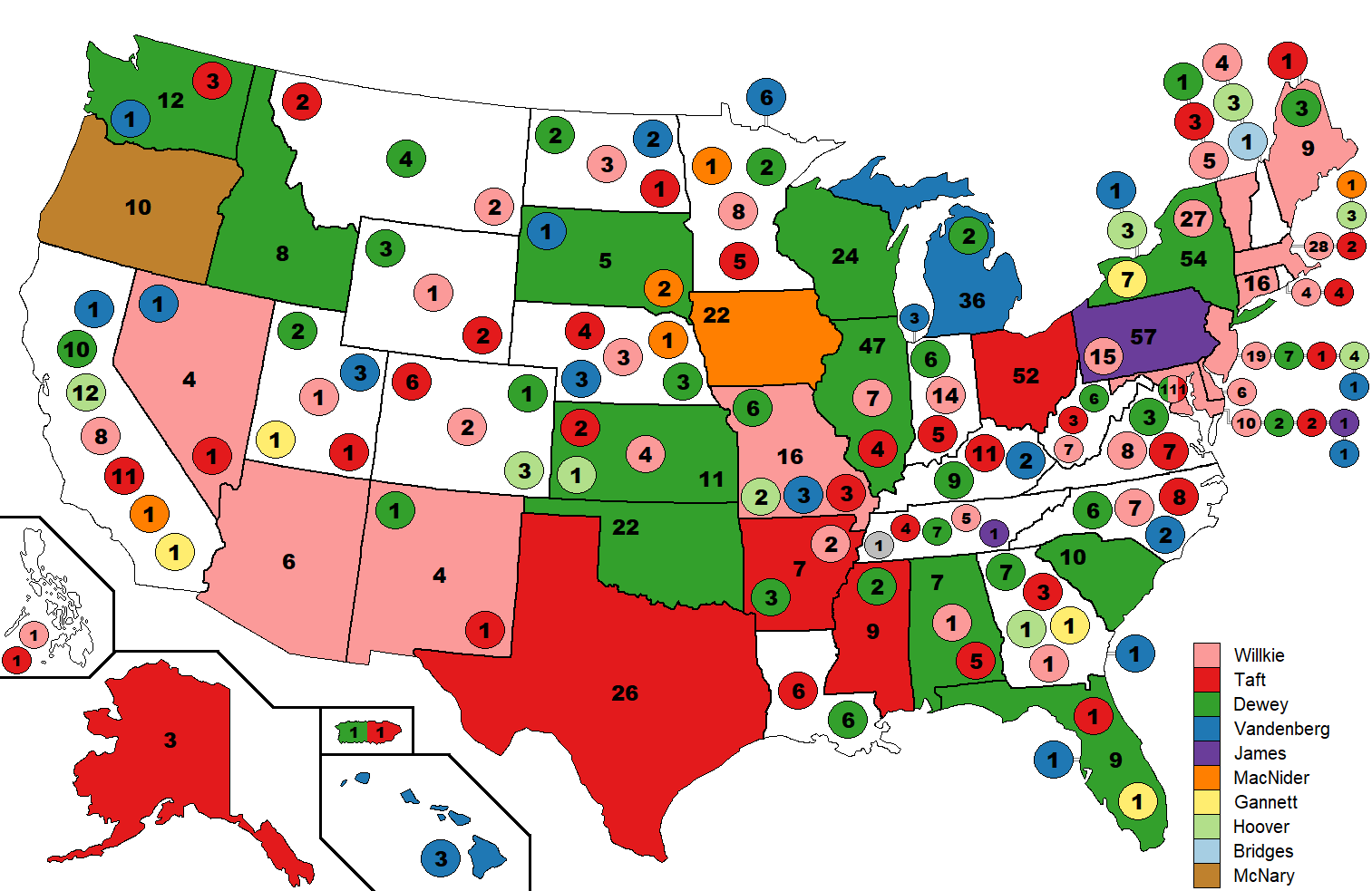
3rd presidential ballot

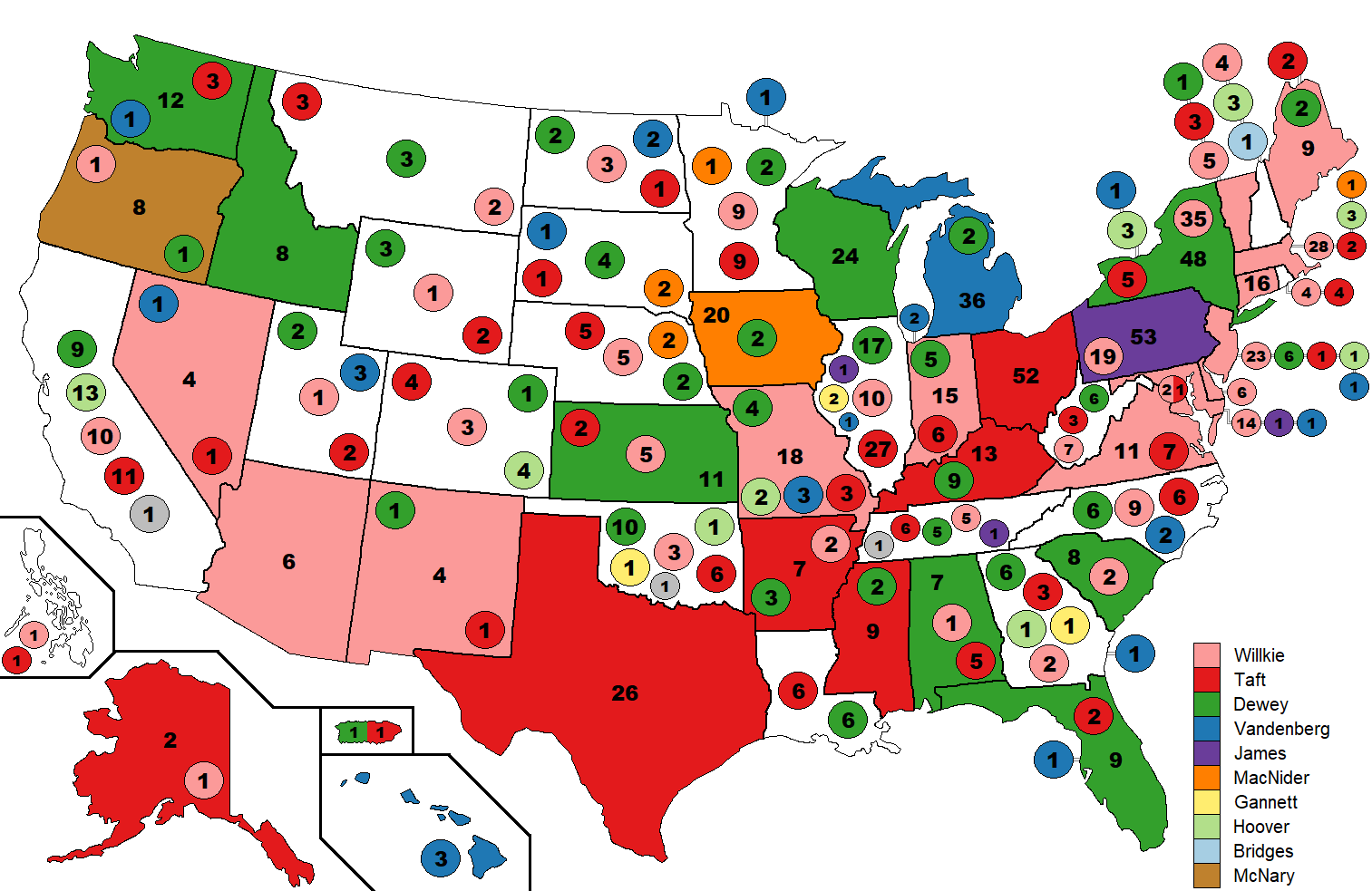
4th presidential ballot

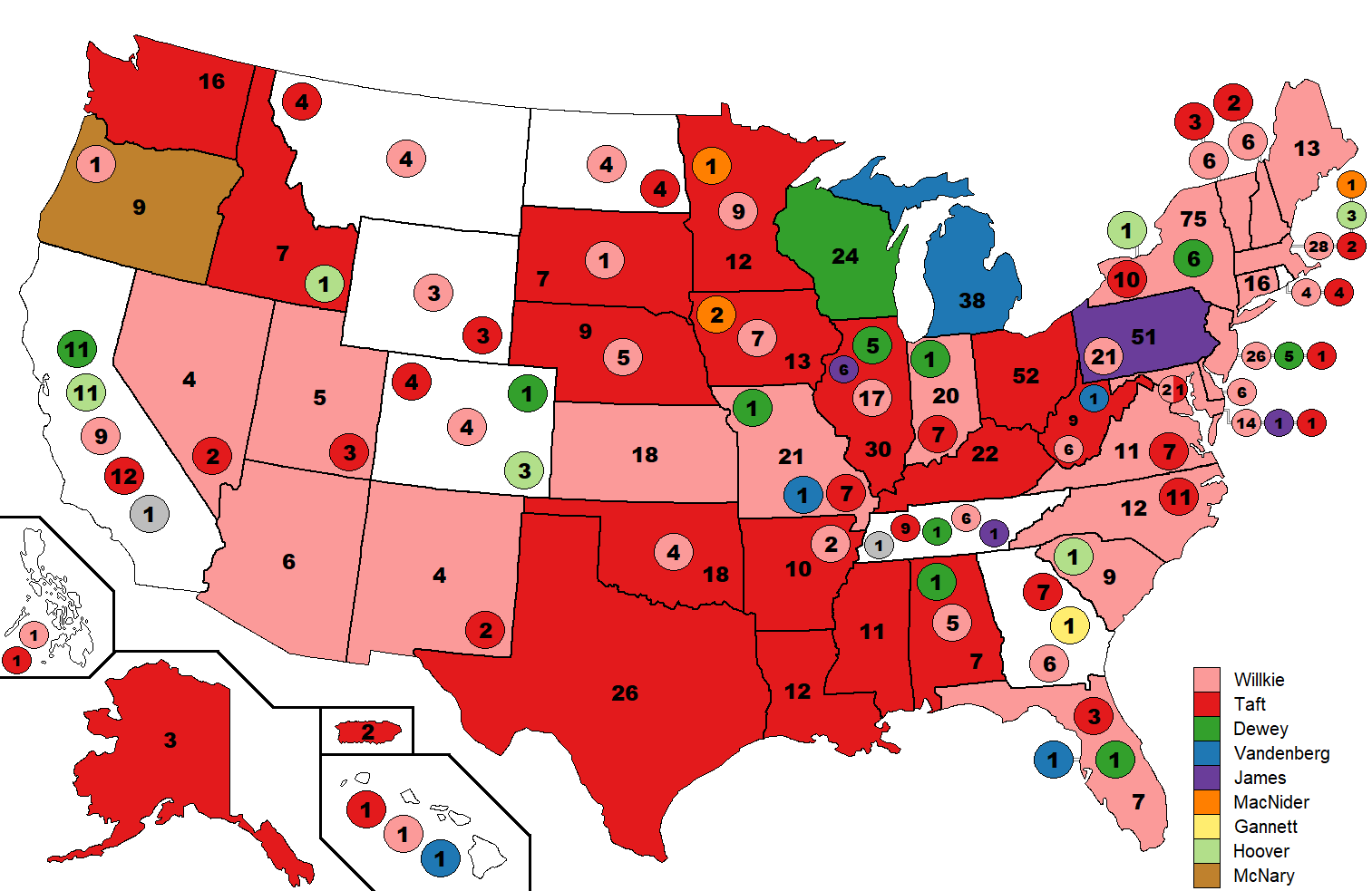
5th presidential ballot

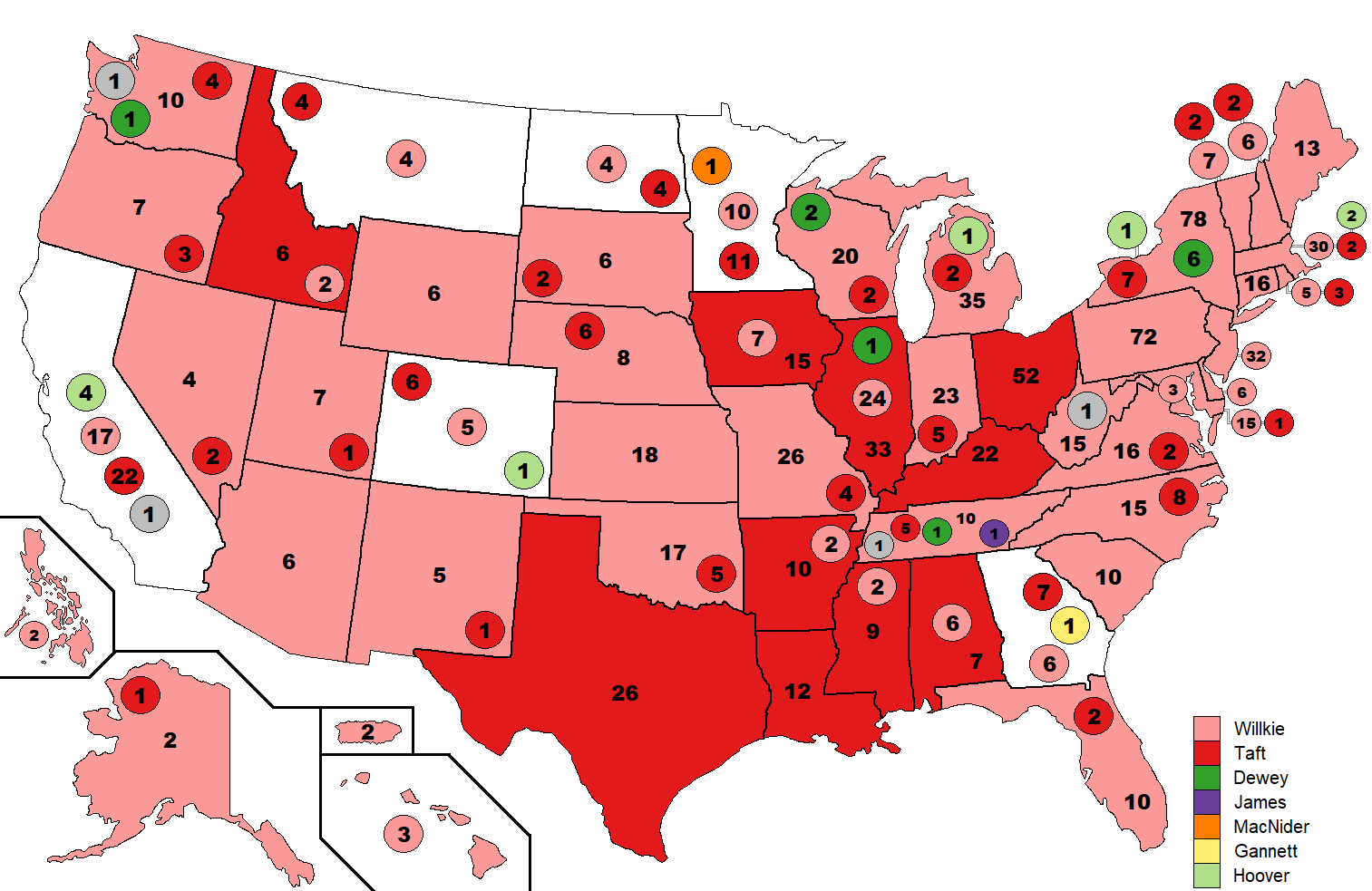
6th presidential ballot
(before shifts)

Presidential balloting / 5th day of convention (June 28, 1940)

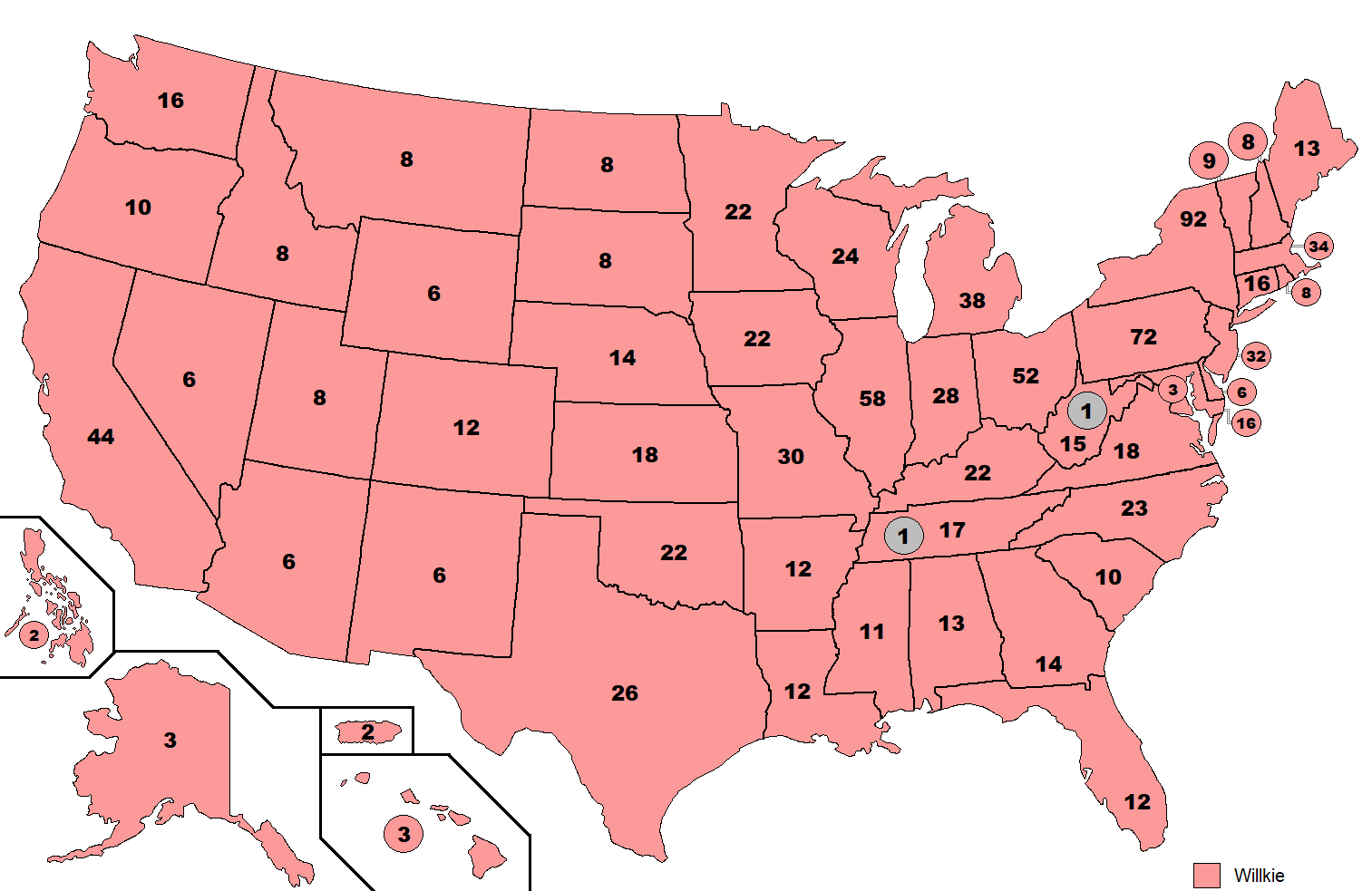
6th presidential ballot
(after shifts)

"On the first ballot, Dewey was ahead followed by Taft and Willkie. Thereafter, Dewey steadily lost strength while Taft and Willkie picked up votes. On the fourth ballot Willkie was ahead but short of the 501 votes needed for nomination. On the sixth roll call — 1 a.m. Friday — Willkie finally went over the top."

Willkie's nomination is still considered by most historians to have been one of the most dramatic moments in any political convention.

=== Willkie's acceptance speech ===
Willkie also made history with his personal appearance at the 1940 convention. "WILLKIE BREAKS PARTY TRADITION BY PERSONAL APPEARANCE LIKE ROOSEVELT'S IN '32", the New York Times' headline told its readers. "CROWD GOES WILD GREETING NOMINEE" and "CHEERS MARK HIS EVERY WORD" in the New York Times' headlines convey something of the convention's mood in 1940. "As your nominee," Willkie told the convention in his brief appearance, "I expect to conduct a crusading, vigorous, fighting campaign."

Willkie delivered his acceptance speech from the podium at the convention hall, something that had never happened at a Republican convention before. It was broadcast on a local television station, also a first.

A couple of months later, Willkie again accepted the nomination in a kick-off speech at Calloway Park in his hometown of Elwood, Indiana.

== Vice presidential nomination ==
=== Vice presidential candidates ===
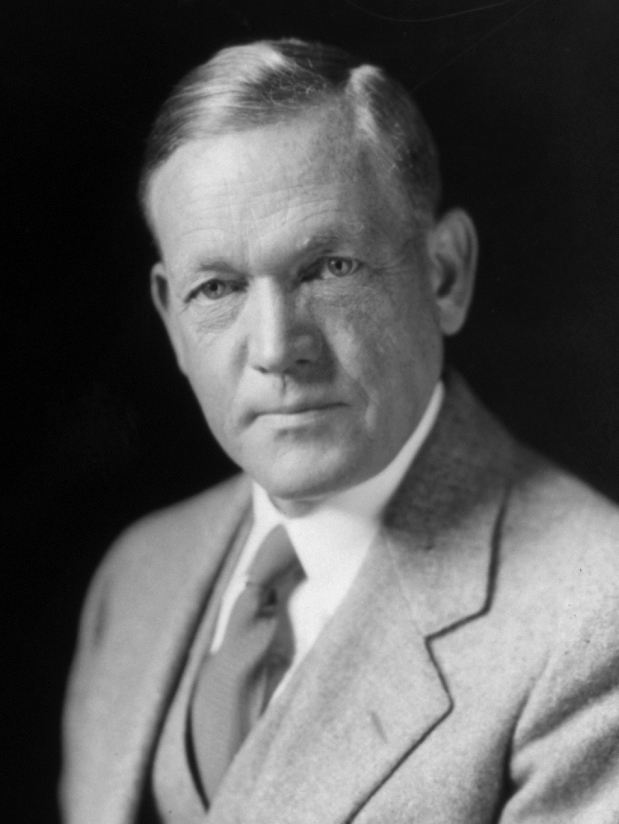
Senate Minority Leader
Charles L. McNary
of Oregon

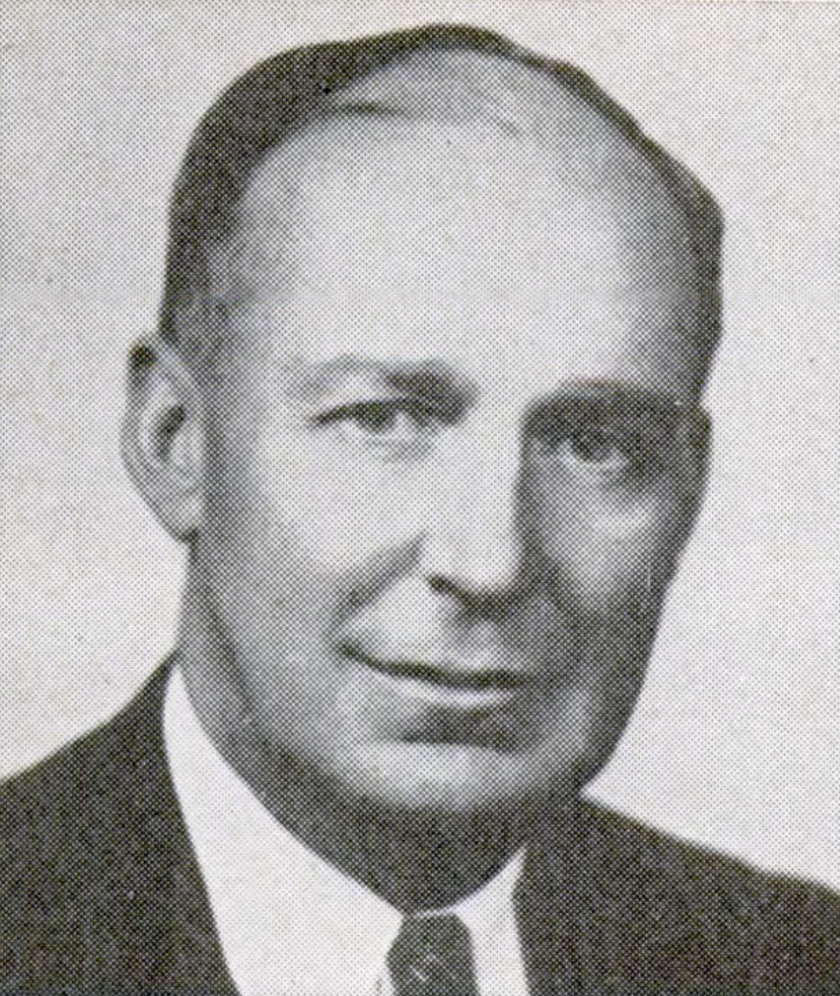
Representative
Dewey Jackson Short
of Missouri

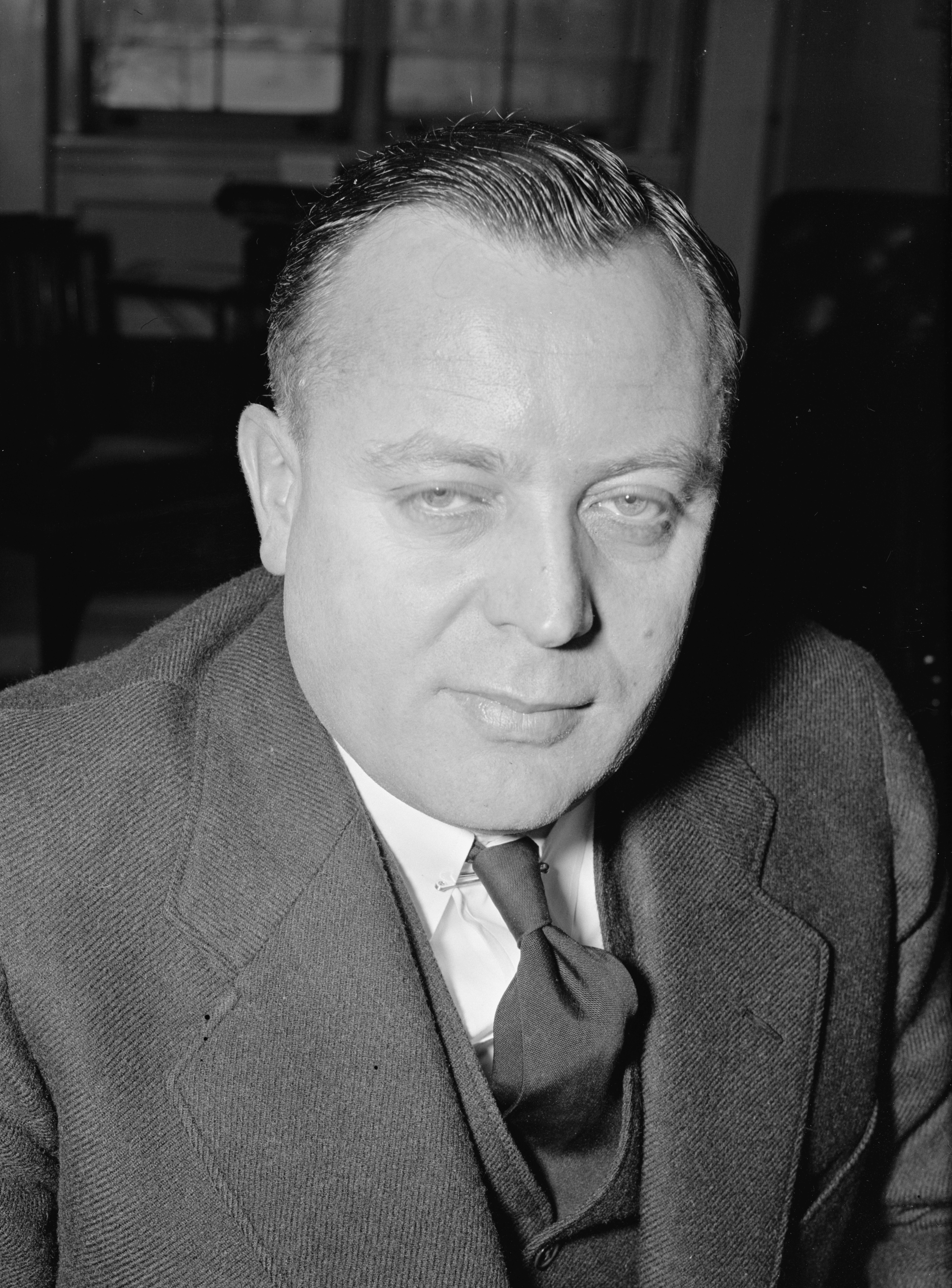
Senator
Styles Bridges
of New Hampshire
(not nominated)

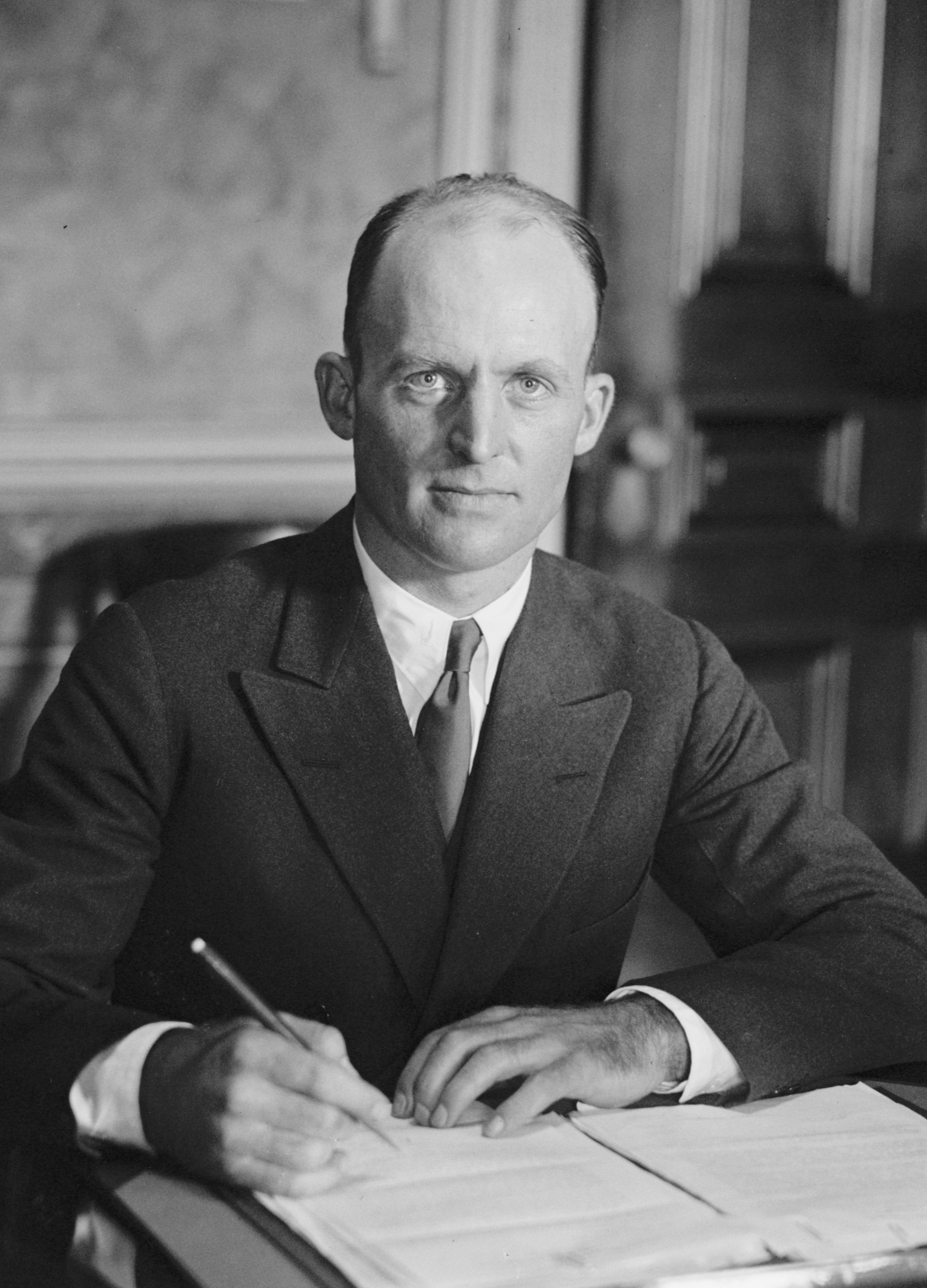
Former Ambassador
Hanford MacNider
of Iowa
(not nominated - declined consideration)

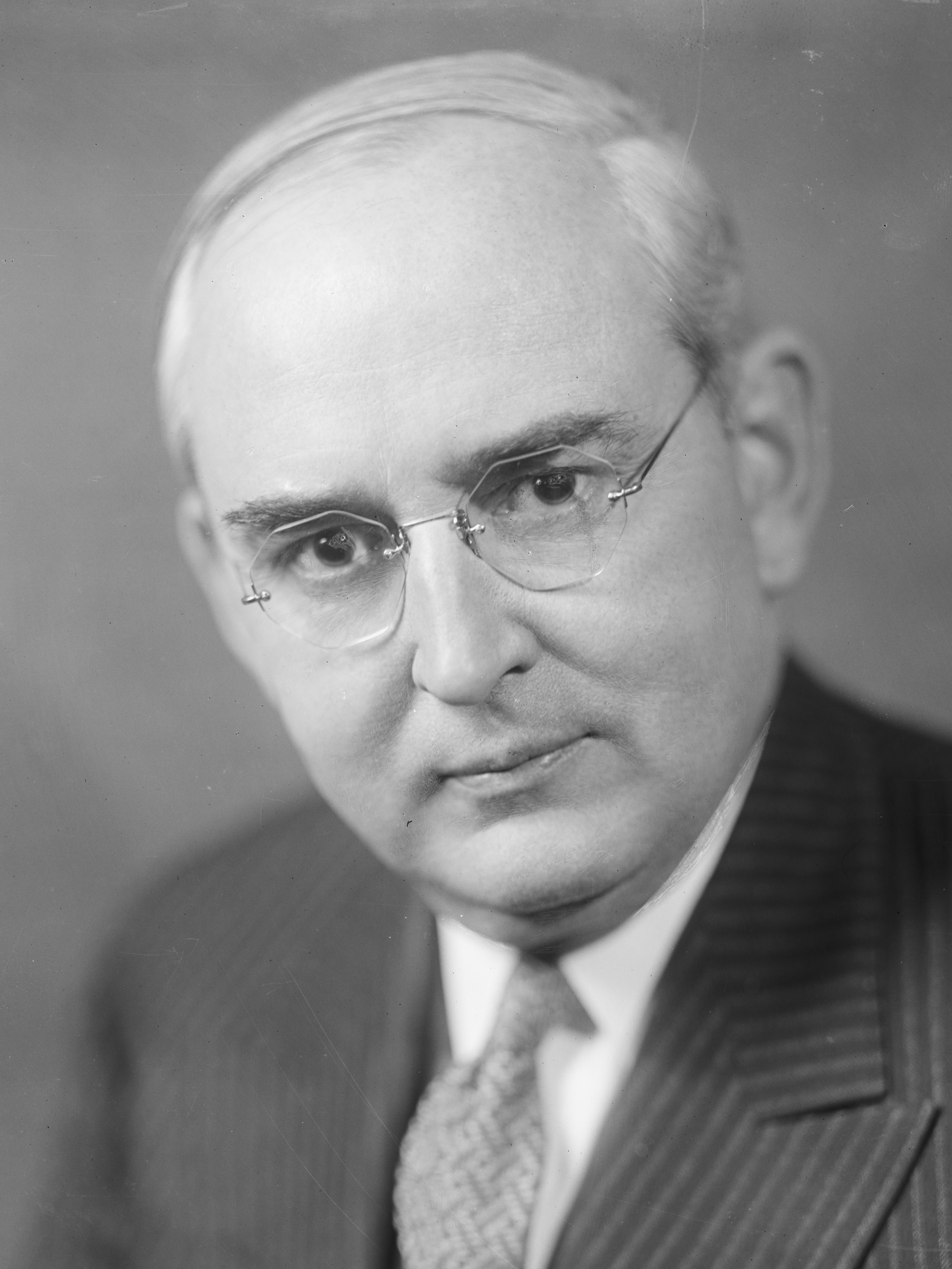
Senator
Arthur Vandenberg
of Michigan
(not nominated - declined consideration)

Willkie had given little thought to the vice-presidential nominee. He left the decision to the convention chairman, Representative Joe Martin (R-Massachusetts), the House Minority Leader. Martin suggested Senate Minority Leader Charles L. McNary of Oregon. Though McNary had spearheaded a "Stop Willkie" campaign late in the balloting, Willkie agreed, and McNary was selected on the first ballot:

Vice presidential ballot
Candidate	1st
McNary	890
Short	108
Bridges	2

Vice presidential balloting / 5th day of convention (June 28, 1940)

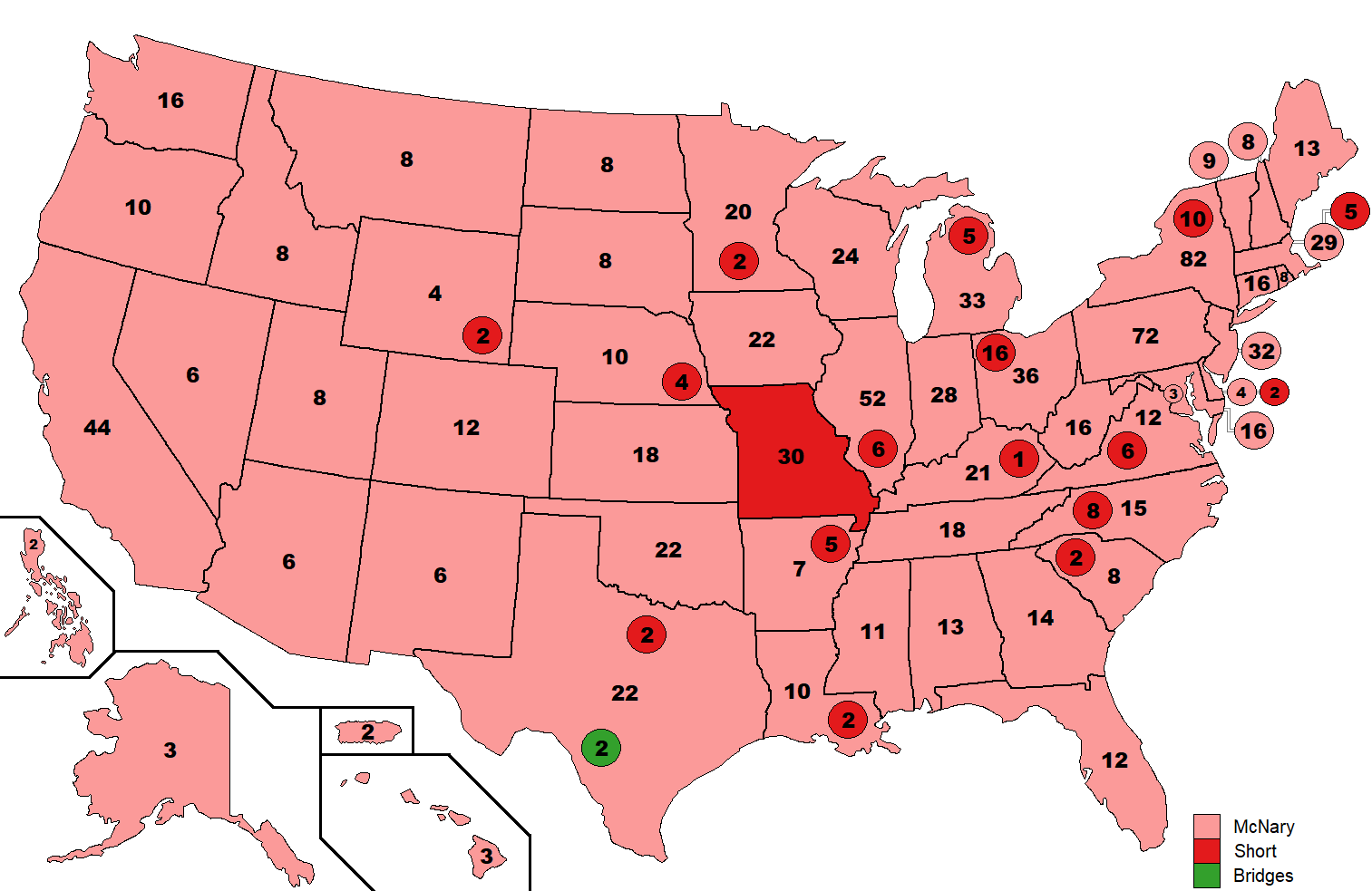
1st
vice presidential ballot

== Other events ==
=== Television coverage ===
The 1940 Republican Convention was the first national party convention shown on live television, and was seen in three cities on "pioneer stations". It was broadcast in New York by NBC on W2XBS (now WNBC), in Philadelphia by W2XE (now KYW-TV), and in Schenectady on W2XB (now WRGB). The convention was also shown on television screens in the exhibition hall of the Commercial Museum of Philadelphia, next door to the Convention Hall, for "overflow" crowds. Local newspapers predicted that two thousand people would view the convention from the museum, and estimates range as high as 6,000 total television viewers in all three cities.

=== Bomb discoveries ===
During the convention, two dynamite bombs were discovered outside of the hall; a total of seven bombs were discovered in the greater Philadelphia area during the convention. The discoveries of the bombs were inadvertently released to the public by an emotional New York City police commissioner Lewis J. Valentine while discussing the New York World's Fair bombing that killed two police officers.

=== British interference ===
In 1999, declassifications by the British Secret Intelligence Service revealed the extent of British involvement in the nominating campaign, among other efforts to elect pro-intervention candidates and destroy the reputations of American isolationists. Working through a covert organization known as British Security Co-ordination, British intelligence agent Sanford Griffith published polls during and before the convention suggesting that a majority of Republicans supported American aid to Britain. These polls were then reported in the pro-Allied press to show support for Willkie. Direct co-ordination between a BSC-funded group of businessmen and journalists, the Century Group, and the Willkie campaign positions commenced after he won the nomination.

== See also ==
- History of the United States Republican Party
- List of Republican National Conventions
- United States presidential nominating convention
- 1940 Republican Party presidential primaries
- 1940 United States presidential election
- 1940 Democratic National Convention
- The Golden Age, historical novel by Gore Vidal, which charges corruption in the management of the convention

Preceded by 1936; Cleveland, Ohio	Republican National Conventions	Succeeded by 1944; Chicago, Illinois
