= 1936 Massachusetts gubernatorial election =

- November 3, 1936
- Turnout: 42.88% (total pop.)

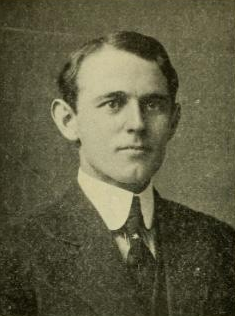
| Nominee | Charles F. Hurley | John W. Haigis |
| Party | Democratic | Republican |
| Popular vote | 867,743 | 839,740 |
| Percentage | 47.62% | 46.08% |
- Hurley: 40–50% 50–60% 60–70% 70–80% Haigis: 40–50% 50–60% 60–70% 70–80% 80–90% >90%
Governor before election
James Michael Curley
Democratic
Elected Governor
Charles F. Hurley
Democratic

The 1936 Massachusetts gubernatorial election was held on November 3, 1936.

Democratic Governor James Michael Curley chose to run for United States Senate rather than seek a second term in office. Incumbent Democratic Treasurer Charles F. Hurley was elected governor over former Republican State Treasurer John W. Haigis.

== Democratic primary ==
=== Governor ===
==== Candidates ====
- Charles F. Hurley, treasurer and receiver-general of Massachusetts
- William McMasters, publicity agent and whistleblower in the Charles Ponzi case

===== Declined =====
- James Michael Curley, incumbent governor (to run for U.S. Senate)

==== Results ====
1936 Democratic gubernatorial primary
| Party | Candidate | Votes | % |
|---|---|---|---|
| Democratic | Charles F. Hurley | 356,239 | 98.78% |
| Democratic | William McMasters | 2,809 | 0.78% |
| Write-in | All others | 1,596 | 0.44% |
| Total votes | | 360,644 | 100.00% |
| None | Blank votes | 92,879 | — |
| Turnout | | 453,523 | 100.00% |

Following his loss in the Democratic primary, McMasters accepted the nomination of the Union Party.

=== Lt. governor ===
==== Candidates ====
- Thomas F. Galvin, Lawrence city alderman and commissioner of public safety
- Francis E. Kelly, former member of the Boston City Council and candidate for lt. governor in 1932 and 1934
- Philip J. Philbin, special counsel for the United States Senate Committee on Education and Labor and ally of Senator David I. Walsh

==== Results ====
1936 Democratic lieutenant gubernatorial primary
| Party | Candidate | Votes | % |
|---|---|---|---|
| Democratic | Francis E. Kelly | 171,045 | 45.20% |
| Democratic | Philip J. Philbin | 131,133 | 34.65% |
| Democratic | Thomas F. Galvin | 76,008 | 20.09% |
| Write-in | All others | 241 | 0.06% |
| Total votes | | 378,427 | 100.00% |
| None | Blank votes | 75,102 | — |
| Turnout | | 453,529 | 100.00% |

== Republican primary ==
=== Governor ===
==== Candidates ====
- John W. Haigis, former treasurer and receiver-general of Massachusetts

==== Results ====
Haigis was unopposed for the Republican nomination.

1936 Republican gubernatorial primary
| Party | Candidate | Votes | % |
|---|---|---|---|
| Republican | John W. Haigis | 418,095 | 99.74% |
| Write-in | All others | 1,090 | 0.26% |
| Total votes | | 419,185 | 100.00% |
| None | Blank votes | 59,116 | — |
| Turnout | | 478,301 | 100.00% |

=== Lt. governor ===
==== Candidates ====
- Leverett Saltonstall, speaker of the Massachusetts House of Representatives

==== Results ====
Speaker Saltonstall was unopposed for the Republican nomination.

1936 Republican lieutenant gubernatorial primary
| Party | Candidate | Votes | % |
|---|---|---|---|
| Republican | Leverett Saltonstall | 410,660 | 99.98% |
| Write-in | All others | 68 | 0.02% |
| Total votes | | 410,728 | 100.00% |
| None | Blank votes | 67,573 | — |
| Turnout | | 478,301 | 100.00% |

== General election ==
=== Candidates ===
- Fred G. Bushold (Union-Coughlin-Townsend)
- John W. Haigis, former treasurer and receiver-general of Massachusetts (Republican)
- Horace I. Hillis, candidate for lt. governor in 1934 (Socialist Labor)
- Otis Archer Hood (Communist)
- Charles F. Hurley, treasurer and receiver-general of Massachusetts (Democratic)
- Alfred Baker Lewis, attorney, civil rights activist, and perennial candidate (Socialist)
- William McMasters, publicity agent and whistleblower in the Charles Ponzi case (Union)

=== Results ===
1936 Massachusetts gubernatorial election
| Party | Candidate | Votes | % | ±% |
|---|---|---|---|---|
| Democratic | Charles F. Hurley | 867,743 | 47.62% | ▼2.03 |
| Republican | John W. Haigis | 839,740 | 46.08% | ▲3.78 |
| Union | William McMasters | 68,467 | 3.76% | ▲3.76 |
| Townsend | Fred G. Bushold | 23,605 | 1.30% | N/A |
| Socialist | Alfred B. Lewis | 9,483 | 0.52% | ▼0.31 |
| Communist | Otis Archer Hood | 6,026 | 0.28% | ▲0.05 |
| Socialist Labor | Horace I. Hillis | 3,769 | 0.21% | ▼0.18 |
| Prohibition | Alfred H. Evans | 3,424 | 0.19% | ▼0.01 |
| Write-in | All others | 0 | 0.00% | |
| Democratic hold | | Swing | | |

== See also ==
- 1935–1936 Massachusetts legislature

== Bibliography ==
- Frederic W. Cook, Secretary of the Commonwealth (1936). Election Statistics, 1935–36. Boston, MA.
