= Charles F. Hurley =

American politician (1893–1946)

Charles Francis Hurley
- Hurley in 1937

54th Governor of Massachusetts
- In office January 7, 1937 – January 5, 1939
- Lieutenant: Francis E. Kelly
- Preceded by: James M. Curley
- Succeeded by: Leverett A. Saltonstall

45th Treasurer and Receiver-General of Massachusetts
- In office January 1931 – January 1937
- Governor: Joseph B. Ely; James M. Curley
- Preceded by: John W. Haigis
- Succeeded by: William E. Hurley

Personal details
- Born: November 24, 1893 Boston, Massachusetts, U.S.
- Died: March 24, 1946 (aged 52) Boston, Massachusetts, U.S.
- Party: Democratic

Charles Francis Hurley (November 24, 1893 – March 24, 1946) was an American attorney and the 54th governor of the U.S. state of Massachusetts and one of its first Irish-American governors.

== Early years ==
Charles Francis Hurley was born in Cambridge, Massachusetts, to John and Elizabeth (Maker or Mahar) Hurley. He attended public schools in Cambridge, then Boston College High School. His mother died when he was seven, and his father when he was twelve. He was then raised by the family housekeeper, with a former United States district attorney as his legal guardian. He studied for two years at Boston College, before becoming a salesman for athletic goods. He entered the United States Navy in the First World War, serving in a radio intelligence unit stationed at Harvard University. After the war Hurley entered the real estate business, in partnership with James M. Conley. In 1924 he married Conley's daughter Marion; the couple had five children.

Hurley was member of a number of social and fraternal organizations, including the American Legion, the Ancient and Honorable Artillery Company of Massachusetts, the Hibernian Society, and the Irish National Foresters.

== Political career ==
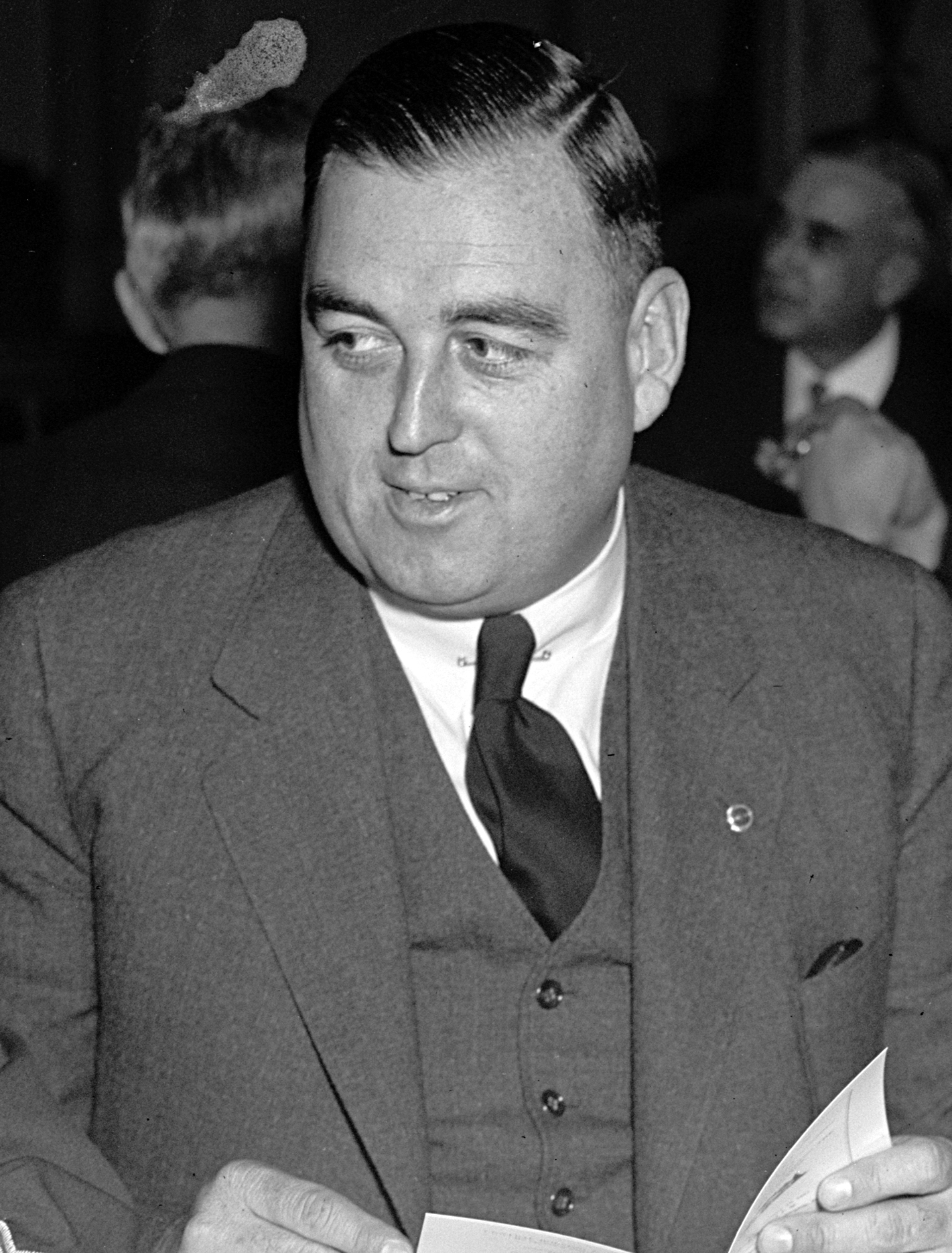
Hurley in 1937

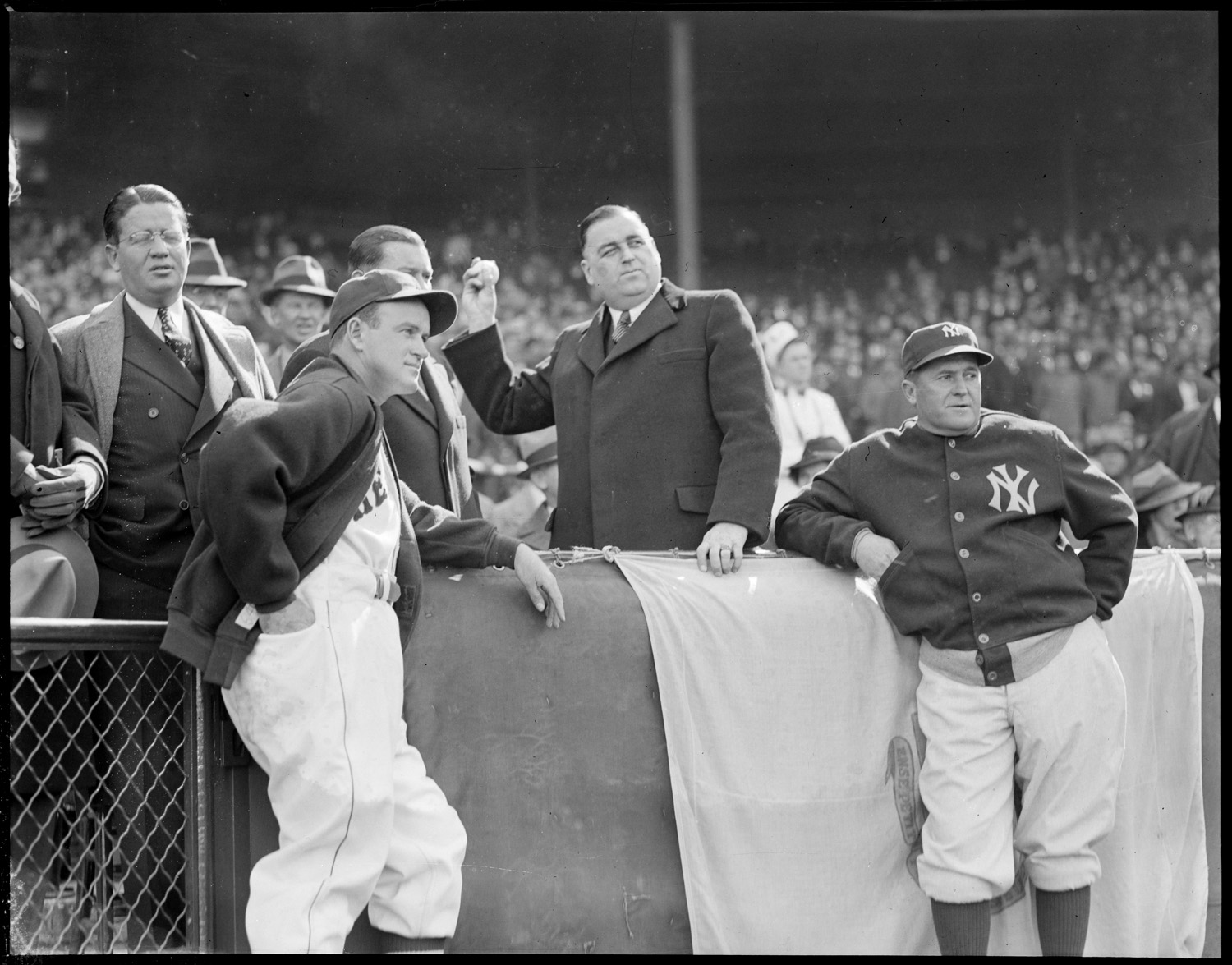
Hurley throws out the first ball as Boston Red Sox manager Joe Cronin and New York Yankees manager Joe McCarthy watch, at Fenway Park on April 23, 1937

Hurley's entry into politics was in 1919, when he won election to the Cambridge school committee, on which he served until 1931. In 1930 he ran as a Democrat for the position of Massachusetts State Treasurer, winning three consecutive two-year terms. Each year he defeated his Republican opponent by wide margins, leading to calls for him to stand for governor. Governor Joseph B. Ely appointed Hurley to the state administration's committee which distributed federal New Deal relief money, and was aligned with the Democratic Party faction opposed to James Michael Curley, the powerful Mayor of Boston. This faction was generally opposed to the influx of federal money, and the party infighting meant that Hurley minimized the number of Curley supporters the committee engaged, and that the distribution of relief aid was hampered by the ongoing dispute. In 1936, he won the Democratic Party nomination for governor (Curley, the incumbent, was seeking a Senate seat), and then won the general election, defeating the Republican candidate, former state treasurer John W. Haigis.

Governor Hurley's administration was a brief departure from the increasing ethnic conflict between Yankee Protestants and Irish-American Catholics in political machines, party control, and business influence which had marked the state's early 20th century history. As a result of immigration in the late 19th and early 20th century, the predominant power of the native American classes had first eroded in Boston and then the state with brief checks and restoration of Yankee power in the interim. Irish immigration had been reduced to a trickle with the Immigration Act of 1924, further immigration was negligible, and there was a process of assimilation and competition between the two groups for remaining power. Hurley represented the more legitimate side to Irish American politics and he attempted to prove the Americanization of his ethnic community by turning away from ethnic spoils which had marked his predecessors. Included amongst his program of cleaning up the civil service were the regulation of labor practices and emphasis on individual rights.

During Governor Hurley's administration the Fair Trades Laws were passed which regulated the use of private police in strikes, imposed a minimum wage for women and children, and further regulated industrial work. While these practices endeared him to both ethnic groups, his administration also marked a departure from past practices with its increasing liberalism. Although both Yankee and Irish American voters had favored it, he vetoed a law to require teachers to take loyalty oaths. Additionally he raised the ire of Georgia's Governor Eurith D. Rivers by refusing to extradite James Cunningham who had escaped from a Georgia chain gang thirteen years earlier. Hurley further upset Yankee and Irish interests which had a long tradition of local representative democracy when he also approved a fifth form of municipal government in Massachusetts, called Plan E. This allowed for an appointed city manager and a city council drawn from a proportional representation of the vote, rather than a collection of majority elected precinct candidates. Yankee interests in several cities, such as Boston, had cherished their old Charter government from both historical precedence and the ability of ward representatives in protecting their interests in the majority Irish American city. The later in turn had long used the form of government in defending their interests when they were a minority and saw its abolition as a direct threat to their way of conducting business.

Hurley oversaw the state response to the New England Hurricane of 1938, one of the worst natural disasters to strike the state.

== Later years and legacy ==
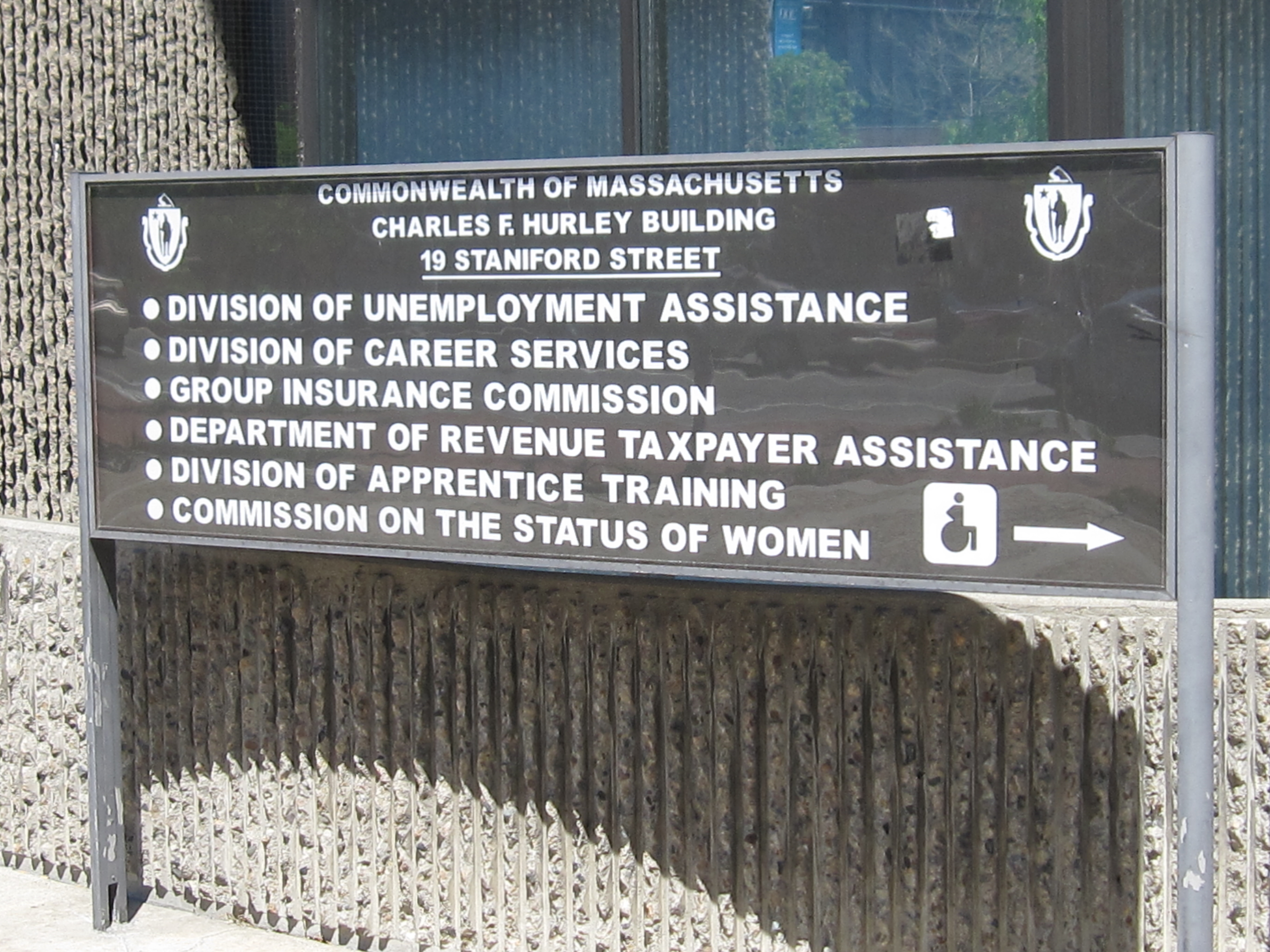
Hurley building, Boston, 2011

When Hurley ran for reelection in 1938, he was opposed by James Curley, who had lost the 1936 Senate race. Curley rallied the state labor establishment to his side, and defeated Hurley in the primary. Curley was defeated in the general election by former Massachusetts Speaker of the House Leverett Saltonstall.

Hurley then returned to private life, serving as a trustee of the Cambridge Public Library from 1941 until his death. He died on March 24, 1946. He is buried at Cambridge Cemetery in Cambridge, Massachusetts.

The Charles F. Hurley Building in Boston's Government Center complex is named after him.

== Sources ==
- "Hurley Orphan at 12; State Treasurer in 1930". The Boston Globe. March 25, 1946. pp. 1, 9.
- Hannon, Caryn (2008). Massachusetts Biographical Dictionary. Hamburg, MI: State History Publications. ISBN 9781878592668. OCLC 198759744.
- Trout, Charles H (1977). Boston: The Great Depression and the New Deal. New York: Oxford University Press. ISBN 9780195021905. OCLC 185503039.

Party political offices
Preceded by James P. Bergin	Democratic nominee for Treasurer and Receiver-General of Massachusetts; 1930, 1932, 1934	Succeeded by James M. Hurley
Preceded by James Michael Curley	Democratic nominee for Governor of Massachusetts; 1936	Succeeded by James Michael Curley
Political offices
Preceded by James M. Curley	Governor of Massachusetts; 1937–1939	Succeeded by Leverett Saltonstall
Preceded by John W. Haigis	Treasurer and Receiver-General of Massachusetts; 1931 –1937	Succeeded by William E. Hurley
