= Frank J. Leveroni =

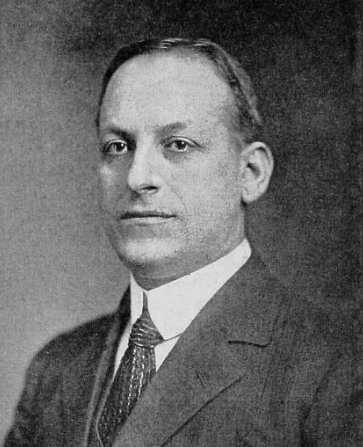
- Born: September 10, 1879; Genoa, Italy
- Died: August 1, 1948 (aged 68); Boston, Massachusetts, United States
- Occupation: Judge
- Spouse: Louise Finochietti (m. 1903)
- Children: Boston University School of Law

Frank J. Leveroni (September 10, 1879, Genoa, Italy – August 1, 1948) was an Italian-American judge.

== Biography ==
Frank J. Leveroni was born in Genoa on September 10, 1879. He was educated in Boston public schools, attended Harvard Law School, and earned an LL.B. degree from the Boston University School of Law. He married Louise Finochietti on October 5, 1903.

In 1905, he was appointed a special justice of the Boston Juvenile Court. According to Vincent J. Lapomarda, S.J., in the book A Century of Judges of Italian Descent in Massachusetts, he was the first man of Italian descent to hold a judicial position in Massachusetts. He began serving in August 1906.

On August 31, 1908, he was named a Knight of the Order of the Crown of Italy by King Victor Emmanuel III.

He was a member of several civic organizations, the Harvard Club, the Boston City Club, and was an incorporator of the Home for Italian Children.

He died at his home in Jamaica Plain on August 1, 1948.
