= John W. Haigis =

American politician and publisher (1881-1960)

John W. Haigis, Sr.
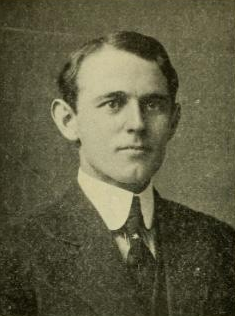

Treasurer and Receiver General of Massachusetts
- In office 1928–1930
- Governor: Alvan T. Fuller; Frank G. Allen
- Preceded by: William S. Youngman
- Succeeded by: Charles F. Hurley

Massachusetts State Senate
- In office 1923–1927

Massachusetts State Senate
- In office 1913–1915

Massachusetts House of Representatives 3rd Franklin District
- In office 1909–1913

Town of Montague, Massachusetts Board of Water Commissioners
- In office 1910–1915

Town of Montague, Massachusetts Assessor
- In office 1908–1908

Town of Montague, Massachusetts Auditor
- In office 1907–1907

Town of Montague, Massachusetts Treasurer and Collector
- In office 1903–1906

Personal details
- Born: July 31, 1881 Montague, Massachusetts Turners Falls, U.S.
- Died: 1960
- Resting place: Green River Cemetery, Greenfield, Massachusetts
- Party: Republican
- Spouse: Rose Grace Luippold
- Children: Elizabeth Lucretia Haigis, John William Haigis Jr. (19 Feb 1917 - 27 Oct 1988), Rose Margaret Haigis (23 May 1920 - 25 Apr 1992)
- Profession: Publisher and Banker

John William Haigis, Sr. (July 31, 1881 – 1960) was an American newspaper publisher, businessman and politician. Haigis was the editor and publisher of the Greenfield Recorder. Haigis was the founder of WHAI radio.

== Marriage and family ==
On December 3, 1913, Haigis married Rose Grace Luippold, daughter of Johann Martin Luippold and Elizabeth E. Jacobus, in Montague, Massachusetts. They had three children Elizabeth Lucretia Haigis, John William Haigis Jr. and Rose Margaret Haigis.

== Town of Montague public offices ==
From 1903 to 1908 Haigis served in various town offices in the Town of Montague, Massachusetts. He successively served in the capacities as the town's Treasurer, Tax Collector, Auditor, Assessor and Water Commissioner.

== Massachusetts State offices ==
Haigis served as a member of the Massachusetts House of Representatives, Massachusetts State Senate, and the Treasurer and Receiver-General of Massachusetts from 1929 to 1931.

In 1934 Haigis was the Republican party nominee for Lieutenant Governor, and in 1936 for the Republican nominee for Governor, he lost both elections.

Haigis also served as a trustee of the University of Massachusetts Amherst from 1940 to 1956. Haigis Mall on the campus is named for him.

== WHAI ==
On March 1, 1937, Haigis applied to the FCC for a permit to construct a radio station, the application was to construct a radio station in Greenfield that would operate on 1210 kHz, 250 watts power daytime.

Haigis was granted a license for a radio station call sign WHAI. According to the Springfield (MA) Republican, the station made its debut on March 16, 1938.

In 1938 it was recommended that WHAI be allowed to broadcast on unlimited basis, instead of being restricted to daytime broadcast.

== Death and interment ==
Haigis died in 1960, and was buried in Green River Cemetery, Greenfield, Massachusetts.

== See also ==
- 1915 Massachusetts legislature
- 1916 Massachusetts legislature
- 1923–1924 Massachusetts legislature
- 1925–1926 Massachusetts legislature

== Bibliography ==
- Haigis papers at the University of Massachusetts Amherst. Includes a biographical note.
- A Souvenir of Massachusetts legislators, page 94, (1915).
- Who's who in New England By Albert Nelson Marquis, page 494 (1915).
- Who's who in state politics, page 170, (1911).
- Who's who in state politics page 75, (1915).

Party political offices
Preceded by William S. Youngman	Republican nominee for Treasurer and Receiver-General of Massachusetts; 1928	Succeeded by Fred J. Burrell
Preceded by Gaspar G. Bacon	Republican nominee for Lieutenant Governor of Massachusetts; 1934	Succeeded by Leverett Saltonstall
Preceded by Gaspar G. Bacon	Republican nominee for Governor of Massachusetts; 1936	Succeeded by Leverett Saltonstall
Political offices
Preceded by William S. Youngman	Treasurer and Receiver-General of Massachusetts; 1928 – 1930	Succeeded by Charles F. Hurley
