= Frank A. Goodwin =

American lawyer and politician (1874-1947)

Massachusetts Registrar of Motor Vehicles
- In office 1920–1928
- Preceded by: Position created
- Succeeded by: George A. Parker
- In office 1935–1944
- Preceded by: Morgan Ryan
- Succeeded by: Rudolph King

Chairman of the Boston Finance Commission
- In office 1929–1934
- Preceded by: John C. L. Dowling
- Succeeded by: Joseph J. Leonard

Personal details
- Born: October 20, 1874 Bolton, Quebec, Canada
- Died: June 15, 1947 (aged 72) Fairhaven, Massachusetts, U.S.
- Party: Republican
- Education: Boston University School of Law

Frank A. Goodwin (October 20, 1874 – June 15, 1947) was an American politician who was Massachusetts Registrar of Motor Vehicles from 1920 to 1928 and from 1935 to 1944.

== Early life ==
Goodwin was born on October 20, 1874, to American parents residing in a Quebec lumber camp. During his youth, Goodwin's family moved to East Boston. He was politically active during his younger years. He graduated from East Boston High School in 1892 and after a year at Phillips Exeter Academy, attended the Boston University School of Law. To finance his education, Goodwin played semi pro baseball. After graduating in 1899, Goodwin opened a law office in Day Square. He also engaged in the real estate and insurance business from this office. He was also the proprietor of an East Boston bowling alley, which allowed him to meet many voters in his council district.

== Early career ==
In 1902, Goodwin was an unsuccessful candidate for the Boston Common Council. In 1908 and 1909 he represented Ward 1 on Boston's Common Council. In 1911, Goodwin's letter to Mayor John F. Fitzgerald led the Boston Finance Commission to investigate the city's assessment on the estate of Joseph B. Moors. That same year he was a candidate for the Boston City Council. He finished fifth in an at-large election where the top three candidates were elected. In 1914, Mayor James Michael Curley appointed Goodwin to a seat on the city street commission that had been vacated by Congressman-elect James A. Gallivan. Goodwin and his fellow commissioners worked to alleviate downtown traffic by removing streetcars from several thoroughfares and converting a number of streets to one-ways. In 1918 he and fellow commissioner Francis J. Brennan were removed by Curley's successor, Andrew James Peters. Following his removal, Goodwin ran for city council, but finished last in the seven-candidate race.

== First stint as registrar ==
In 1920, public works commissioner John N. Cole appointed Goodwin to the newly created position of the Registrar of Motor Vehicles. As registrar he ran a vigorous campaign against motor vehicle accidents and attacked the practice of "fixing" motor vehicle violations. After faulty brakes were found to have caused an accident that killed his 3-year-old grandson, Goodwin instituted semi-annual inspections for all motor vehicles. He met monthly with fellow registrars from New England, the Mid-Atlantic states, and Eastern Canada to discuss common issues and potential solutions, which helped lead to the creation of the American Association of Motor Vehicle Administrators.

Goodwin used his position to attack the state judicial system, which he felt was too lenient, as well as political figures, including those in his own party. On February 28, 1928, when speaking before a legislative committee on a bill regarding state employee salaries, Goodwin claimed that governor Alvan T. Fuller had acted in bad faith and told him that "nobody can cross me and get away with it". The following day, Goodwin's superior, William F. Williams demanded that Goodwin retract his allegations or lose his job. On March 1, Williams removed Goodwin.

== Finance commission ==
Goodwin sought the Republican nomination for Governor in the 1928 Massachusetts gubernatorial election. He lost to Lieutenant Governor Frank G. Allen 61% to 39%. On October 9, 1929, Allen appointed Goodwin chairman of the Boston Finance Commission. He ran for Governor again in 1932 and lost the Republican nomination to William S. Youngman 50% to 42%. On April 25, 1934, Governor Joseph B. Ely appointed Joseph J. Leonard to a vacant seat on the finance commission and designated him chairman. Goodwin challenged Ely's ability to remove him as chairman before his five-year term had ended. On April 27, 1934, the commission voted 4 to 1 to accept Leonard as its new chairman and rejected Goodwin's request to have the Massachusetts Attorney General rule on who was the legal chairman. Soon thereafter, Goodwin filed a mandamus petition with the Massachusetts Supreme Judicial Court. In the 1934 Massachusetts gubernatorial election, Goodwin sought both the Republican and Democratic nominations. In the Republican primary, Goodwin lost to Gaspar G. Bacon 63% to 37%. In the Democratic contest, Goodwin received 6% of the vote to James Michael Curley's 64% and Charles H. Cole's 30%. After losing both the Democratic and Republican primaries, Goodwin entered the general election as an independent on the "Equal Tax" platform. On September 26, 1934, the Massachusetts Supreme Judicial Court dismissed Goodwin's petition. His term ended on October 9, 1934, and Leonard wrote to Governor Ely that Goodwin's "continued presence on the commission is only an embarrassment to its work and proper functioning". He stated that Goodwin's litigation had interfered with his duties as chairman and also alleged that there were many cases during Goodwin's tenure as chairman where the committee had prematurely ended investigations. Goodwin denied the allegations and accused gubernatorial opponent Gaspar G. Bacon of being behind the attack. Former Mayor James Michael Curley crossed party lines and supported Goodwin over fellow Democrat Leonard. He accused the commission of submitting the report to hurt Goodwin's candidacy for Governor. On October 17, 1934, Ely appointed Alexander Wheeler to Goodwin's seat on the commission, ending his tenure on the board. Goodwin received 6% of the vote in the gubernatorial election, which was won by Curley.

== Second stint as registrar ==
On January 25, 1935, Governor Curley asked public works commissioner William F. Callahan to fire registrar of motor vehicles Morgan Ryan and replace him with Goodwin. His appointment was confirmed by the Massachusetts Governor's Council on February 6, 1935, and took office the following day. Goodwin retired on August 10, 1944, shortly before he reached the mandatory retirement age of 70.

== Later life ==
In 1944, Goodwin ran for Massachusetts State Auditor. He won the Republican nomination but lost to Democratic incumbent Thomas J. Buckley 52% to 47%. Following his defeat, Goodwin ran a restaurant and gas station with his son. Following his wife's death, Goodwin moved to Melrose, Massachusetts, to live with his son. In December 1946, Goodwin underwent a gallbladder operation and remained in ill health until his death on June 15, 1947, at his summer home in Fairhaven, Massachusetts.

Party political offices
Preceded by Russell A. Wood	Republican nominee for Auditor of Massachusetts; 1944	Succeeded by Russell A. Wood
