= 1924 Massachusetts gubernatorial election =

- November 4, 1924
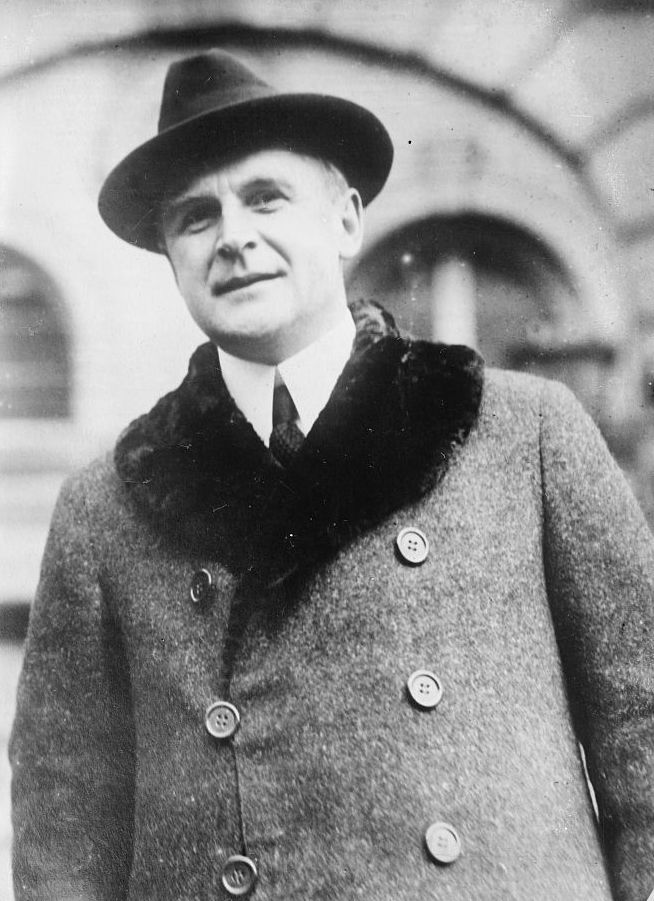

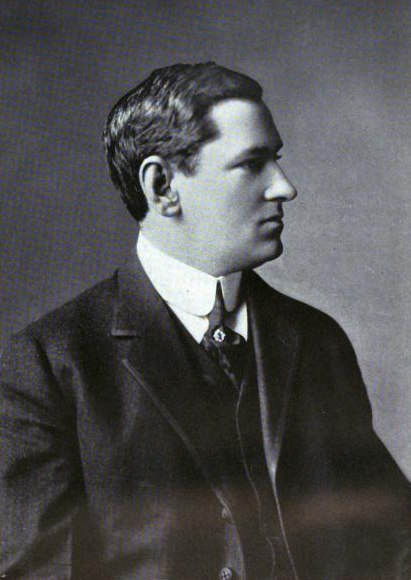
| Nominee | Alvan T. Fuller | James Michael Curley |
| Party | Republican | Democratic |
| Popular vote | 650,817 | 490,010 |
| Percentage | 56.03% | 42.19% |
- Fuller: 40-50% 50–60% 60–70% 70–80% 80–90% >90% Curley: 40-50% 50–60% 60–70% 70–80%
Governor before election
Channing H. Cox
Republican
Elected Governor
Alvan T. Fuller
Republican

The 1924 Massachusetts gubernatorial election was held on November 4, 1924.

Incumbent Republican Lieutenant Governor Alvan T. Fuller was elected over Boston mayor James Michael Curley.

== Republican primary ==
=== Governor ===
==== Candidates ====
- Alvan T. Fuller, incumbent lieutenant governor
- James Jackson, treasurer and receiver-general of Massachusetts

==== Results ====
1924 Republican gubernatorial primary
| Party | Candidate | Votes | % |
|---|---|---|---|
| Republican | Alvan T. Fuller | 193,282 | 57.14% |
| Republican | James Jackson | 144,960 | 42.86% |
| Write-in | All others | 4 | 0.00% |
| Total votes | | 338,246 | 100.00% |

=== Lt. governor ===
==== Candidates ====
===== Declared =====
- Frank G. Allen, state senator from Norwood

==== Results ====
Allen was unopposed for the Republican nomination.

1924 Republican lt. gubernatorial primary
| Party | Candidate | Votes | % |
|---|---|---|---|
| Republican | Frank G. Allen | 296,008 | 100.00% |
| Write-in | All others | 5 | 0.00% |
| Total votes | | 296,013 | 100.00% |

== Democratic primary ==
=== Governor ===
==== Candidates ====
- James Michael Curley, mayor of Boston

==== Results ====
Curley was unopposed for the Democratic nomination.

1924 Democratic gubernatorial primary
| Party | Candidate | Votes | % |
|---|---|---|---|
| Democratic | James Michael Curley | 125,931 | 99.97% |
| Write-in | All others | 35 | 0.03% |
| Total votes | | 125,966 | 100.00% |

=== Lt. governor ===
==== Candidates ====
- Thomas J. Boynton, former Massachusetts attorney general and mayor of Everett
- John J. Cummings, former state representative and candidate for lieutenant governor in 1922
- William A O'Hearn, state senator from North Adams

==== Results ====
1924 Democratic lt. gubernatorial primary
| Party | Candidate | Votes | % |
|---|---|---|---|
| Democratic | John J. Cummings | 57,614 | 50.29% |
| Democratic | William A. O'Hearn | 36,435 | 31.80% |
| Democratic | Thomas J. Boynton | 20,512 | 17.90% |
| Write-in | All others | 5 | 0.00% |
| Total votes | | 114,566 | 100.00% |

== General election ==
=== Candidates ===
- John J. Ballam, Marxist activist and trade union organizer (Workers)
- James Michael Curley, mayor of Boston (Democratic)
- Alvan T. Fuller, lieutenant governor (Republican)
- James Hayes, perennial candidate (Socialist Labor)
- Walter S. Hutchins, perennial candidate (Socialist)

=== Results ===
1924 Massachusetts gubernatorial election
| Party | Candidate | Votes | % | ±% |
|---|---|---|---|---|
| Republican | Alvan T. Fuller | 650,817 | 56.03% | ▲3.79 |
| Democratic | James Michael Curley | 490,010 | 42.19% | ▼3.23 |
| Workers | John J. Ballam | 9,506 | 0.82% | ▲0.82 |
| Socialist | Walter S. Hutchins | 6,292 | 0.54% | ▼0.49 |
| Socialist Labor | Henry Hess | 4,854 | 0.42% | ▼0.11 |
| Write-in | All others | 31 | 0.00% | Steady |

== See also ==
- 1923–1924 Massachusetts legislature

== Bibliography ==
- Office of the Secretary of the Commonwealth (1924). Election Statistics, 1924. Boston, MA.
