= 1932 Massachusetts gubernatorial election =

- November 8, 1932
- Turnout: 36.82% (total pop.)
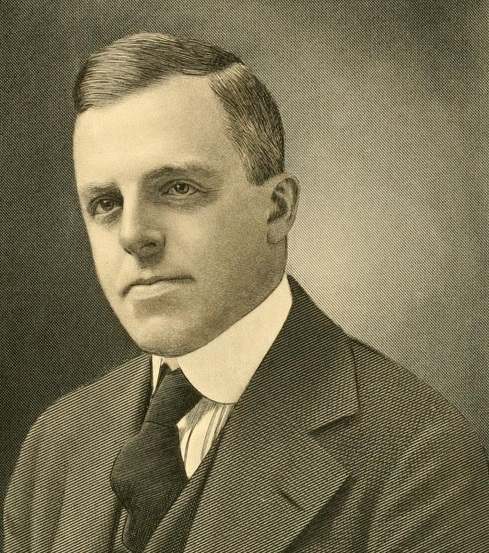

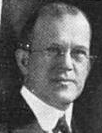
Nominee	Joseph B. Ely	William S. Youngman
Party	Democratic	Republican
Popular vote	825,479	704,576
Percentage	52.76%	45.03%
- Ely: 40–50% 50–60% 60–70% 70–80% Youngman: 40–50% 50–60% 60–70% 70–80% 80–90%
Governor before election
Joseph B. Ely
Democratic
Elected Governor
Joseph B. Ely
Democratic

The 1932 Massachusetts gubernatorial election was held on November 8, 1932.

Incumbent Democratic governor Joseph B. Ely was re-elected to a second term in office. This was the only election between 1910 and 1944 in which the Democratic candidate received a majority of the popular vote.

== Democratic primary ==
=== Governor ===
==== Candidates ====
- Joseph B. Ely, incumbent governor

==== Results ====
Governor Ely was unopposed for re-nomination.

1932 Democratic gubernatorial primary
Party	Candidate	Votes	%
Democratic	Joseph B. Ely (incumbent)	255,290	99.99%
Write-in	All others	19	0.01%
Total votes		255,309	100.00%

=== Lt. governor ===
==== Candidates ====
- Edward P. Barry, former lieutenant governor (1914–1915)
- David J. Brickley, former Boston city councilor (1920–1926) and council president (1922)
- Raymond A. Fitzgerald, member of the Cambridge school committee
- William I. Hennessey, former member of the Massachusetts House of Representatives
- Francis E. Kelly, member of the Boston City Council (1930–1933)
- John F. Malley, former collector of internal revenue; candidate for lieutenant governor in 1928 and 1930
- Michael C. O'Neill, mayor of Everett, Massachusetts (1930–1934)
- John E. Swift, law associate of Senator David I. Walsh and supreme director of the Knights of Columbus

==== Results ====
1932 Democratic lieutenant gubernatorial primary
Party	Candidate	Votes	%
Democratic	John E. Swift	69,678	22.53%
Democratic	Edward P. Barry	68,607	22.18%
Democratic	Michael C. O'Neill	36,694	11.87%
Democratic	Raymond A. Fitzgerald	36,155	11.69%
Democratic	Francis E. Kelly	31,467	10.18%
Democratic	David J. Brickley	30,900	9.99%
Democratic	William I. Hennessey	19,237	6.22%
Democratic	John F. Malley	16,510	5.34%
Write-in	All others	5	0.00%
Total votes		309,253	100.00%

== Republican primary ==
=== Governor ===
==== Candidates ====
- Walter E. Brownell, attorney
- Frank A. Goodwin, former registrar of motor vehicles and candidate for governor in 1928
- E. Mark Sullivan, corporation counsel of Boston
- William S. Youngman, lieutenant governor of Massachusetts

==== Results ====
1932 Republican gubernatorial primary
Party	Candidate	Votes	%
Republican	William S. Youngman	209,372	50.12%
Republican	Frank A. Goodwin	178,676	42.77%
Republican	E. Mark Sullivan	18,119	4.34%
Republican	Walter E. Brownell	11,541	2.76%
Write-in	All others	4	0.00%
Total votes		417,712	100.00%

=== Lt. governor ===
==== Candidates ====
- Gaspar G. Bacon, president of the Massachusetts Senate
- Chester I. Campbell, member of the Governor's Council

==== Results ====
1932 Republican lieutenant gubernatorial primary
Party	Candidate	Votes	%
Republican	Gaspar G. Bacon	230,453	58.33%
Republican	Chester I. Campbell	164,627	41.67%
Write-in	All others	2	0.00%
Total votes		395,082	100.00%

== General election ==
=== Results ===
1932 Massachusetts gubernatorial election
Party	Candidate	Votes	%	±%
Democratic	Joseph B. Ely (incumbent)	825,479	52.76%	▲3.22
Republican	William S. Youngman	704,576	48.18%	▼3.15
Socialist	Alfred B. Lewis	24,503	0.67%	▲0.90
Communist	John J. Ballam	6,118	0.39%	▼0.02
Socialist Labor	Charles S. Oram	3,811	0.24%	▼0.95
Write-in	All others	74	0.01%	▲0.01
Democratic hold		Swing		

== See also ==
- 1931–1932 Massachusetts legislature

== Bibliography ==
- Frederic W. Cook, Secretary of the Commonwealth (1932). Election Statistics, 1931–32. Boston, MA.
