= Washington Cook =

American politician

Member of the Massachusetts Governor's Council from the 2nd District
- In office 1925–1927
- Preceded by: William W. Ollendorff
- Succeeded by: Chester I. Campbell

Personal details
- Born: February 22, 1873 Boston
- Died: October 12, 1955 (aged 82) Haverhill, Massachusetts
- Party: Republican / Independent
- Spouse: Bertha Hodgdon (?–1943; her death)

Washington Cook (February 22, 1873 – October 12, 1955) was an American politician who served one term on the Massachusetts Governor's Council. He was the brother of Massachusetts State Auditor Alonzo B. Cook.

== Early life ==
Cook was born on February 22, 1873, in Boston. He attended public school in Boston and Somerville, Massachusetts. Cook later moved to Sharon, Massachusetts, where he served on the town's school committee.

== Political career ==
On March 9, 1922, Cook announced that he would challenge Henry Cabot Lodge for his United States Senate seat. He ran on a platform that supported the League of Nations, women's suffrage, enforcement of the 18th Amendment, measures to stop the lynching of African-Americans in the south, creation of a national divorce law, and adequate compensation for soldiers. He finished fifth out of six candidates with 0.9%.

In 1924, Cook upset incumbent Executive Councilor William W. Ollendorff in the 2nd District Republican primary.

In 1926, Cook ran for reelection to his council seat and also ran as an independent for the office of United States Senator. In his second run for the U.S. Senate, Cook supported modification of the Volstead Act, old age pensions, public ownership of coal mines, railroads, oil fields, and hydroelectric power, and elimination of the Electoral College. Cook finished a distant third in the 2nd District Republican primary behind Chester I. Campbell and William W. Ollendorff and received 0.47% of the vote in the U.S. Senate election.

Cook was the Prohibition Party's nominee in the 1928 Massachusetts gubernatorial election. He received 0.2% of the vote.

In 1930, Cook challenged his brother, Alonzo, for his office of Massachusetts State Auditor. It was reported that the Cooks "[had] not been friendly for some time" and their disagreements once led to a physical altercation. Washington Cook later withdrew from the race, but not after he launched what the Boston Daily Globe described as "a vigorous attack" on his brother.

In 1933, Cook ran for Mayor of Boston on a platform supporting censorship of motion pictures, the abolition of civil service, creation of a traffic signal system, and fiscal conservatism. Alonzo Cook was also a candidate, although Washington Cook said that he was not aware of his brother's candidacy at the time he entered the race. Washington Cook was not considered to be a strong contender and withdrew from the race in September.

In 1944, Cook, now a resident of Haverhill, Massachusetts, won the Republican nomination for the Massachusetts Governor's Council seat in District 5. He lost the general election to Democrat Robert V. O'Sullivan. He ran again in 1948, but lost in the Republican primary.

=== Electoral history ===
Washington Cook electoral history

United States Senate election in Massachusetts, 1922

- Henry Cabot Lodge (Republican) - 414,130 (47.59%)
- William A. Gaston (Democratic) - 406,776 (46.67%)
- John A. Nicholls (Independent) - 24,866 (2.85%)
- John Weaver Sherman (Socialist) - 11,678 (1.34%)
- Washington Cook (Independent) - 7,836 (0.90%)
- William E. Weeks (Progressive) - 4,862 (0.55)

1924 Republican primary for the Massachusetts Governor's Council, 2nd District

- Washington Cook - 23,491 (54.48%)
- William W. Ollendorff - 19,627 (45.51%)

1924 general election for the Massachusetts Governor's Council, 2nd District

- Washington Cook (Republican) - 53,800 (39.08%)
- Otho L. Schofeld (Democratic) - 47,171 (34.26%)
- William W. Ollendorff (Independent) - 36,693 (26.65%)

1926 Republican primary for the Massachusetts Governor's Council, 2nd District

- Chester I. Campbell - 14,464 (43.95%)
- William W. Ollendorff - 13,867 (42.13%)
- Washington Cook - 3,332 (10.12%)
- Peter L. Rowell - 1,244 (3.78%)

United States Senate special election in Massachusetts, 1926

- David I. Walsh (Democratic) - 525,303 (52.01%)
- William M. Butler (Republican) - 469,989 (46.54%)
- John J. Ballam (Workers' Party) - 5,167 (0.51%)
- Washington Cook (Independent) - 4,766 (0.47%)
- Alfred Baker Lewis (Socialist) - 4,730 (0.47%)

1928 Massachusetts gubernatorial election

- Frank G. Allen (Republican) - 769,372 (50.06%)
- Charles H. Cole (Democratic) - 750,137 (48.81%)
- Mary Donovan Hapgood (Socialist) - 7,486 (0.49%)
- Chester W. Bixby (Workers' Party) - 4,495 (0.29%)
- Washington Cook (Prohibition) - 3,098 (0.20%)
- Stephen Surridge (Socialist Labor) - 1,374 (0.09%)
- Edith Hamilton MacFadden (Independent) - 928 (0.06%)

1944 Republican primary for the Massachusetts Governor's Council, 5th District

- Washington Cook - 13,717 (50.60%)
- Fred A. Turner - 8,279 (30.54%)
- S. Howard Donnell (write in) - 5,109 (18.84%)

1944 general election for the Massachusetts Governor's Council, 5th District

- Robert V. O'Sullivan - 108,483 (50.68%)
- Washington Cook - 105,550 (49.31%)

1948 Republican primary for the Massachusetts Governor's Council, 5th District

- Alfred C. Gaunt - 19,605 (58.80%)
- John M. Kelleher - 7,755 (23.26%)
- Washington Cook - 5,978 (17.93%)

== Business career ==
Cook dropped out of Somerville High School to work for the Gutta Percha Rubber Company. After 17 years with the company he was promoted to manager. He retired from the company after 48 years of service.

Cook was also involved in real estate.

In December 1923, Cook declared voluntary bankruptcy. During the proceedings it was revealed that he had pawned $10,000 worth of goods that he had purchased on credit and on one occasion had even sold the pawn ticket.

== Later life ==
On December 26, 1949, Cook was seriously injured when he was struck by a car. His injuries included a fractured right hip and severe lacerations to the face. It was the second time in three months that Cook had been struck by a car.

On December 12, 1954, the boarding house where Cook was residing was set on fire. Cook escaped, but four others died.

Cook died on October 12, 1955, in Haverhill.
