= 1934 Massachusetts gubernatorial election =

- November 6, 1934
- Turnout: 34.90% (total pop.)▼
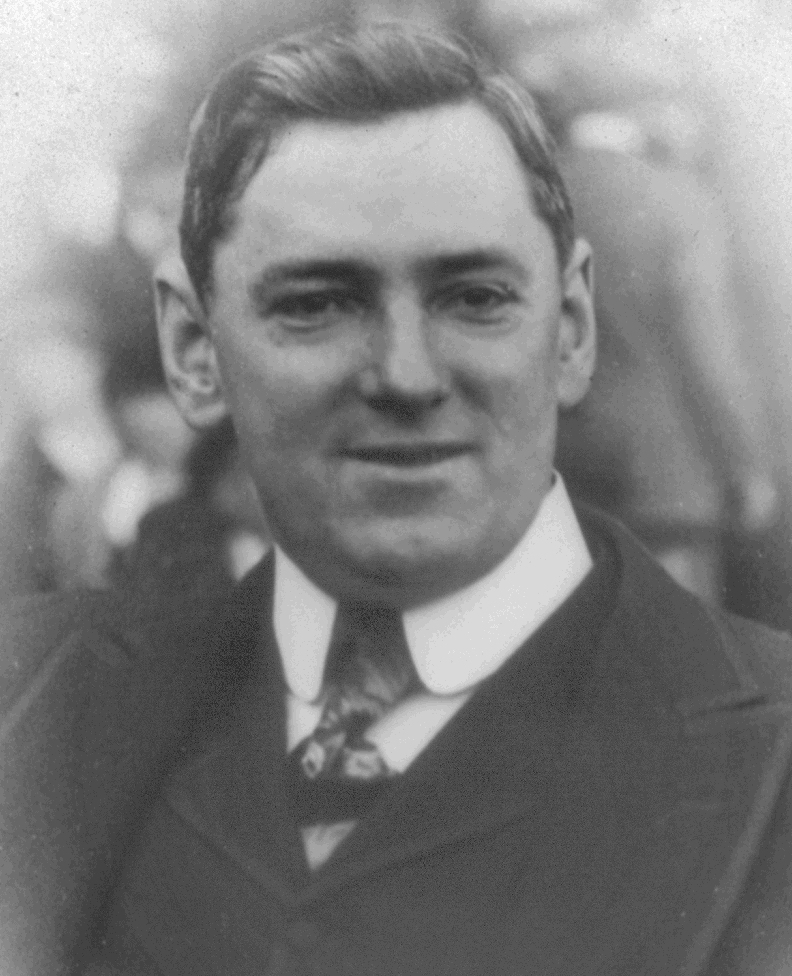

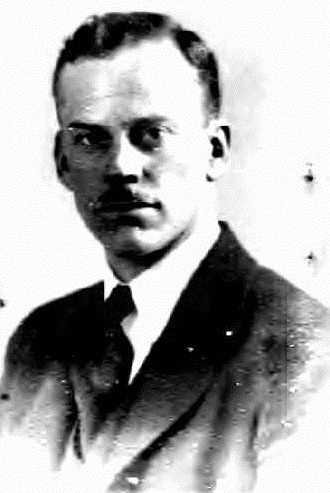

Nominee	James Michael Curley	Gaspar G. Bacon	Frank A. Goodwin
Party	Democratic	Republican	Independent
Popular vote	736,463	627,413	94,141
Percentage	49.65%	42.30%	6.35%
- Curley: 40–50% 50–60% 60–70% 70–80% 80–90% Bacon: 40–50% 50–60% 60–70% 70–80% 80–90% >90%
Governor before election
Joseph B. Ely
Democratic
Elected Governor
James Michael Curley
Democratic

The 1934 Massachusetts gubernatorial election was held on November 6, 1934.

Democratic Mayor of Boston James Michael Curley was elected to his only term as governor of Massachusetts.

== Democratic primary ==
=== Governor ===
==== Candidates ====
- Charles H. Cole, former adjutant general of Massachusetts and nominee for governor in 1928
- James Michael Curley, mayor of Boston and nominee for governor in 1924
- Frank A. Goodwin, former registrar of motor vehicles (also running as a Republican)

==== Results ====
1934 Democratic gubernatorial primary
Party	Candidate	Votes	%
Democratic	James Michael Curley	280,405	64.13%
Democratic	Charles H. Cole	129,025	29.51%
Democratic	Frank A. Goodwin	27,820	6.36%
Write-in		2	0.00%
Total votes		437,252	100.00%

=== Lt. governor ===
==== Candidates ====
- Joseph L. Hurley, mayor of Fall River
- Francis E. Kelly, member of the Boston City Council and candidate for lt. governor in 1932

==== Results ====
1934 Democratic lieutenant gubernatorial primary
Party	Candidate	Votes	%
Democratic	Joseph L. Hurley	234,357	59.51%
Democratic	Francis E. Kelly	159,478	40.49%
Write-in		2	0.00%
Total votes		393,837	100.00%

== Republican primary ==
=== Governor ===
==== Candidates ====
- Gaspar G. Bacon, lieutenant governor
- Frank A. Goodwin, former registrar of motor vehicles (also running as a Democrat)

==== Withdrew ====
- Alvan T. Fuller, former governor of Massachusetts

==== Results ====
1934 Republican gubernatorial primary
Party	Candidate	Votes	%
Republican	Gaspar G. Bacon	229,544	63.26%
Republican	Frank A. Goodwin	133,260	36.73%
Write-in		43	0.01%
Total votes		362,847	100.00%

=== Lt. governor ===
==== Candidates ====
- John W. Haigis, former treasurer and receiver-general of Massachusetts

==== Results ====
Haigis was unopposed for the Republican nomination.

1934 Republican lieutenant gubernatorial primary
Party	Candidate	Votes	%
Republican	John W. Haigis	316,304	100.00%
Write-in		12	0.00%
Total votes		316,316	100.00%

== General election ==
=== Candidates ===
- John W. Aiken, nominee for vice president of the United States in 1932 (Socialist Labor)
- Gaspar G. Bacon, lieutenant governor (Republican)
- James Michael Curley, mayor of Boston (Democratic)
- Freeman W. Follett, resident of Haverhill (Prohibition)
- Frank A. Goodwin, former registrar of motor vehicles (Equal Tax)
- Alfred Baker Lewis, attorney, civil rights activist, and perennial candidate (Socialist)
- Edward Rand Stevens, candidate for lieutenant governor in 1924 (Communist)

After losing both the Democratic and Republican primaries, Goodwin entered the general election as an independent on the "Equal Tax" platform.

=== Results ===
1934 Massachusetts gubernatorial election
Party	Candidate	Votes	%	±%
Democratic	James Michael Curley	825,479	49.65%	▼3.11
Republican	Gaspar G. Bacon	704,576	42.30%	▼5.88
Equal Tax	Frank A. Goodwin	94,141	6.35%	N/A
Socialist	Alfred B. Lewis	12,282	0.83%	▲0.16
Socialist Labor	John W. Aiken	5,803	0.39%	▲0.15
Communist	Edward Rand Stevens	4,137	0.28%	▼0.11
Prohibition	Freeman W. Follett	2,990	0.20%	▲0.20
Write-in		36	0.00%	▼0.01
Democratic hold		Swing		

== See also ==
- 1933–1934 Massachusetts legislature

== Bibliography ==
- Frederic W. Cook, Secretary of the Commonwealth (1934). Election Statistics, 1933–34. Boston, MA.
