= 1922 Massachusetts gubernatorial election =

- November 7, 1922
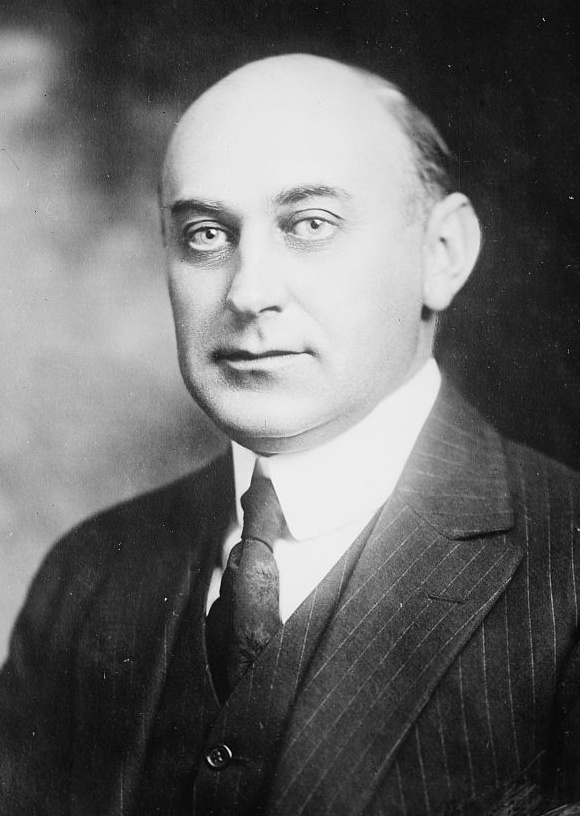

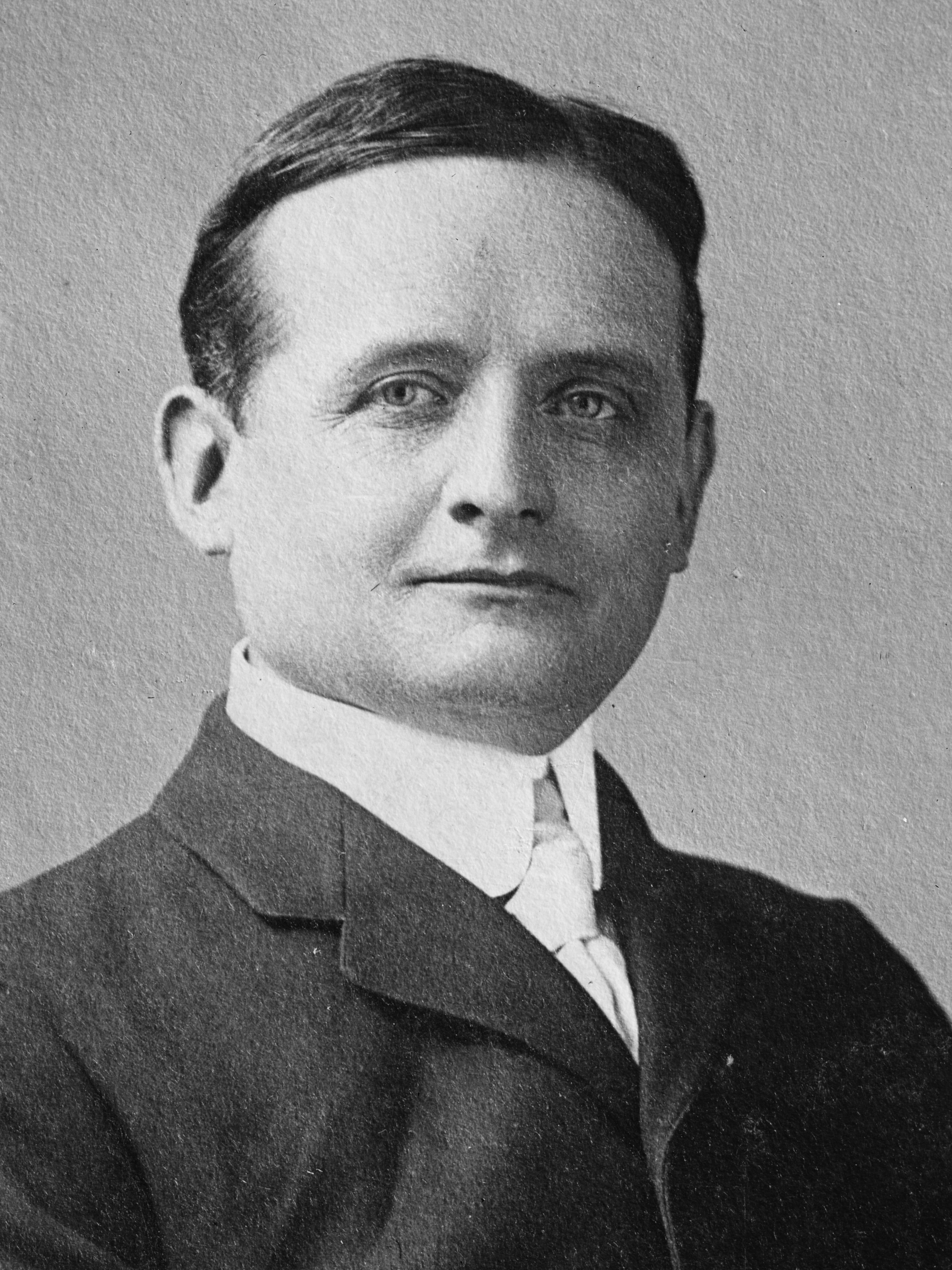
Nominee	Channing H. Cox	John F. Fitzgerald
Party	Republican	Democratic
Popular vote	464,873	404,192
Percentage	52.24%	45.42%
- Cox: 40-50% 50–60% 60–70% 70–80% 80–90% >90% Fitzgerald: 40-50% 50–60% 60–70% 70–80%
Governor before election
Channing H. Cox
Republican
Elected Governor
Channing H. Cox
Republican

The 1922 Massachusetts gubernatorial election was held on November 7, 1922.

Incumbent Governor Channing H. Cox was re-elected over U.S. Representative John F. "Honey Fitz" Fitzgerald for a second term in office.

This was the first gubernatorial election in which the governor's term was changed from one year to two years.

== Republican primary ==
=== Governor ===
==== Candidates ====
- J. Weston Allen, Massachusetts attorney general
- Channing H. Cox, incumbent governor

==== Results ====
1922 Republican gubernatorial primary
Party	Candidate	Votes	%
Republican	Channing H. Cox (incumbent)	212,145	73.19%
Republican	J. Weston Allen	77,692	26.80%
Write-in	All others	11	0.00%
Total votes		289,848	100.00%

=== Lt. governor ===
==== Candidates ====
- Alvan T. Fuller, incumbent lieutenant governor
- Joseph E. Warner, speaker of the Massachusetts House of Representatives

==== Results ====
Incumbent Lt. Governor Alvan Fuller defeated former Speaker of the State House Joseph Warner for the nomination in a rematch of their 1920 contest.

1922 Republican lt. gubernatorial primary
Party	Candidate	Votes	%
Republican	Alvan T. Fuller (incumbent)	176,159	63.35%
Republican	Joseph E. Warner	101,909	36.65%
Write-in	All others	0	0.00%
Total votes		278,068	100.00%

== Democratic primary ==
=== Governor ===
==== Candidates ====
- Joseph B. Ely, former district attorney for the Western District of Massachusetts
- John F. Fitzgerald, former mayor of Boston and U.S. representative
- Eugene Foss, former governor
- Peter F. Sullivan, mayor of Worcester, Massachusetts

==== Results ====
1922 Democratic gubernatorial primary
Party	Candidate	Votes	%
Democratic	John F. Fitzgerald	89,381	50.17%
Democratic	Peter F. Sullivan	53,679	30.13%
Democratic	Joseph B. Ely	21,523	12.08%
Democratic	Eugene Foss	13,576	7.62%
Write-in	All others	0	0.00%
Total votes		178,159	100.00%

=== Lt. governor ===
==== Candidates ====
- John J. Cummings, former state representative from Dorchester
- John F. Doherty, former state representative from Fall River
- Michael A. O'Leary, former chairman of the Massachusetts Democratic state committee

==== Results ====
1922 Democratic lt. gubernatorial primary
Party	Candidate	Votes	%
Democratic	John F. Doherty	62,386	40.56%
Democratic	Michael A. O'Leary	53,985	35.10%
Democratic	John J. Cummings	37,424	24.33%
Write-in	All others	0	0.00%
Total votes		153,795	100.00%

== General election ==
=== Candidates ===
- Channing H. Cox, incumbent governor (Republican)
- John F. Fitzgerald, former mayor of Boston and U.S. representative (Democratic)
- Henry Hess (Socialist Labor)
- Walter S. Hutchins, nominee for governor in 1920 (Socialist)
- John B. Lewis (Prohibition)

=== Results ===
1922 Massachusetts gubernatorial election
Party	Candidate	Votes	%	±%
Republican	Channing H. Cox	464,873	52.24%	▼14.78
Democratic	John F. Fitzgerald	404,192	45.42%	▲15.20
Socialist	Walter S. Hutchins	9,205	1.03%	▼1.06
Prohibition	John B. Lewis	6,870	0.77%	▲0.77
Socialist Labor	Henry Hess	4,713	0.53%	▼0.13
Write-in	All others	10	0.00%	Steady

== See also ==
- 1921–1922 Massachusetts legislature

== Bibliography ==
- Office of the Secretary of the Commonwealth (1922). Election Statistics, 1922. Boston, MA: Wright & Potter Printing Co.
