= 1928 Massachusetts gubernatorial election =

- November 6, 1928
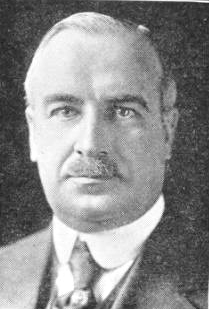

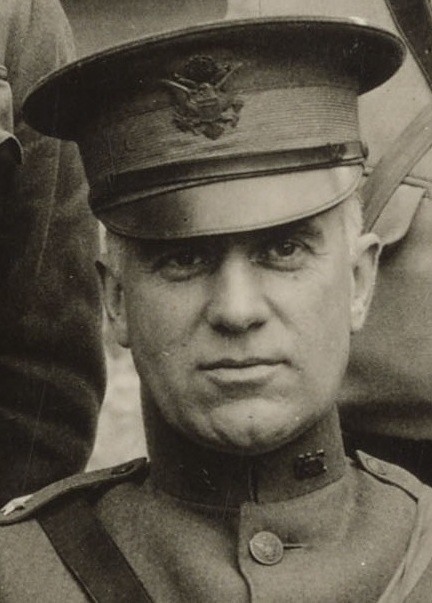
Nominee	Frank G. Allen	Charles H. Cole
Party	Republican	Democratic
Popular vote	769,372	750,137
Percentage	50.06%	48.81%
- Allen: 40-50% 50–60% 60–70% 70–80% 80–90% >90% Cole: 40-50% 50–60% 60–70% 70–80%
Governor before election
Alvan T. Fuller
Republican
Elected Governor
Frank G. Allen
Republican

The 1928 Massachusetts gubernatorial election was held on November 6, 1928.

Incumbent Republican Lieutenant Governor Frank G. Allen was elected to a two-year term, defeating Democrat Charles H. Cole.

The 1928 election represents a major turning point in Massachusetts political history. Al Smith's victory in the state's presidential contest and the competitive gubernatorial election marked a departure from decades of Republican dominance.

== Republican primary ==
=== Governor ===
==== Candidates ====
- Frank G. Allen, lieutenant governor
- Frank A. Goodwin, registrar of motor vehicles

==== Results ====
Lieutenant Governor Frank Allen was nominated over Frank A. Goodwin.

1928 Republican gubernatorial primary
Party	Candidate	Votes	%
Republican	Frank G. Allen	270,022	61.20%
Republican	Frank A. Goodwin	171,167	38.80%
Write-in		6	0.00%
Total votes		441,189	100.00%

=== Lt. governor ===
==== Candidates ====
- George A. Bacon, former chairman of the Massachusetts Republican Party
- Charles L. Burrill, former treasurer and receiver-general of Massachusetts (1915–1920)
- Pehr G. Holmes, member of the Massachusetts Executive Council and former mayor of Worcester (1917–1920)
- John C. Hull, speaker of the Massachusetts House of Representatives since 1925
- Robert M. Leach, former U.S. representative from Taunton (1924–1925)
- Wycliffe C. Marshall
- John H. Sherburne
- William S. Youngman, treasurer and receiver-general of Massachusetts since 1925

==== Results ====
Treasurer William S. Youngman won the highly competitive primary election by 21,099 votes over Speaker of the Massachusetts House of Representatives John C. Hull.

1928 Republican lt. gubernatorial primary
Party	Candidate	Votes	%
Republican	William S. Youngman	113,805	26.68%
Republican	John C. Hull	92,706	21.73%
Republican	Robert M. Leach	66,544	15.60%
Republican	John H. Sherburne	64,822	15.20%
Republican	Pehr G. Holmes	32,945	7.72%
Republican	Charles L. Burrill	26,420	6.19%
Republican	George A. Bacon	24,798	5.81%
Republican	Wycliffe C. Marshall	4,524	1.06%
Write-in		3	0.00%
Total votes		426,569	100.00%

== Democratic primary ==
=== Governor ===
==== Candidates ====
- Brig. Gen. Charles H. Cole, former adjutant general of Massachusetts and commissioner of the Boston Fire and Police Departments
- John J. Cummings, former state representative and candidate for lieutenant governor in 1922 and 1924

==== Results ====
Brigadier General Charles Cole easily defeated John J. Cummings for the Democratic nomination.

1928 Democratic gubernatorial primary
Party	Candidate	Votes	%
Democratic	Charles H. Cole	165,174	80.63%
Democratic	John J. Cummings	39,643	19.35%
Write-in		40	0.02%
Total votes		204,857	100.00%

=== Lt. governor ===
==== Candidates ====
- John F. Malley, former collector of internal revenue
- Charles S. Murphy, resident of Worcester

==== Results ====
1926 Democratic lt. gubernatorial primary
Party	Candidate	Votes	%
Democratic	John F. Malley	115,912	61.02%
Democratic	Charles S. Murphy	74,013	38.97%
Write-in		19	0.01%
Total votes		189,944	100.00%

== General election ==
=== Candidates ===
- Frank G. Allen, incumbent governor (Republican)
- Chester W. Bixby, founding member of the Communist Party of the United States of America (Workers)
- Brig. Gen. Charles H. Cole, former adjutant general of Massachusetts and commissioner of the Boston Fire and Police Departments (Democratic)
- Washington Cook, brother of Alonzo B. Cook and independent candidate for United States Senate in 1922 and 1926 (Vigorous Prohibition Enforcement)
- Mary Donovan Hapgood, secretary of the Sacco-Vanzetti Defense Committee (Socialist)
- Edith Hamilton MacFadden, author (Independent Citizen)
- Stephen Surridge (Socialist Labor)

MacFadden was the first female candidate for governor in the history of Massachusetts. She ran on a platform of reducing tax exemptions. She stated that she found "no opposition to a woman aspiring to the executive position of Governor." She was the mother of actor Hamilton MacFadden.

=== Results ===
1928 Massachusetts gubernatorial election
Party	Candidate	Votes	%	±%
Republican	Frank G. Allen	769,372	50.06%	▼8.70
Democratic	Charles H. Cole	750,137	48.81%	▲8.56
Socialist	Mary Donovan Hapgood	7,486	0.49%	▲0.02
Workers	Chester W. Bixby	4,495	0.29%	▼0.01
Prohibition	Washington Cook	3,098	0.20%	▲0.20
Socialist Labor	Stephen Surridge	1,374	0.09%	▼0.11
Independent	Edith Hamilton MacFadden	928	0.06%	N/A
Write-in		9	0.00%	Steady
Total votes		1,536,899	100.00%	

== See also ==
- 1927–1928 Massachusetts legislature

== Bibliography ==
- Office of the Secretary of the Commonwealth (1926). Election Statistics, 1928. Boston, MA.
