= Joseph J. Leonard =

American politician (1876-1962)

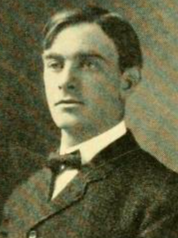
- Leonard circa 1905

Commissioner of the Boston Police Department
- In office 1934–1935
- Preceded by: Eugene Hultman
- Succeeded by: Eugene M. McSweeney

Chairman of the Boston Finance Commission
- In office 1934–1934
- Preceded by: Frank A. Goodwin
- Succeeded by: Jacob J. Kaplan

Member of the Massachusetts House of Representatives from the 23rd Suffolk District
- In office 1904–1905
- Preceded by: John A. Coulthurst
- Succeeded by: A. S. Parker Weeks

Personal details
- Born: May 8, 1876 Jamaica Plain, Boston
- Died: August 20, 1962 (aged 86) Jamaica Plain, Boston
- Party: Democratic

Joseph J. Leonard (May 8, 1876 – August 20, 1962) was an American political figure who served as Commissioner of the Boston Police Department for 58 days.

== Early life ==
Leonard was born on May 8, 1876, in Jamaica Plain. He dropped out of The English High School after one year to go work as a lawyer and accountant.

== Political career ==
Leonard ran for the Massachusetts House of Representatives in 1902, but lost by 250 votes. He ran again in 1903. On election night, Leonard and his opponent, Walter E. Henderson, were tied with 1,744 votes. After a recount, Leonard was declared the victory by 8 votes. He ran for the 8th Suffolk District seat in the Massachusetts Senate in 1906, but lost to Republican Frank Seiberlich 6,686 votes to 5,390. He was a member of the Massachusetts Constitutional Convention of 1917. In 1924, Leonard became an assistant district attorney under Thomas C. O'Brien. In 1934 he was appointed chairman of the Boston Finance Commission by Governor Joseph B. Ely. His right to the position was challenged by his predecessor, Frank A. Goodwin, who remained on the board. The committee voted 4 to 1 against Goodwin's motion to request a legal ruling on the dispute from the Massachusetts Attorney General and Leonard became chairman. During his tenure on the commission, Leonard sought the settlement of a $85,000 claim against former Mayor James Michael Curley, despite Curley's threat of a libel suit.

On December 27, 1934, outgoing Governor Ely appointed Leonard to a five-year term as Boston Police Commissioner. He was opposed by Ely's successor James Michael Curley. Leonard resigned on February 19, 1935, one day before the Massachusetts Governor's Council was to begin hearing's on Curley's request to remove him from office. Curley accepted the resignation effective February 23. At 58 days, Leonard has the shortest tenure as Boston Police Commissioner. ^{1}

After his resignation as police commissioner, Leonard stated that he did not intend to accept another government position and returned to his law practice. He died on August 20, 1962, at Lemuel Shattuck Hospital following a brief illness.

== Note ==
- In 2021, Dennis White served as police commissioner for two days before being placed on administrative leave, however he did not leave office until 4 months later.
