= John J. Cummings =

American politician (1888–1949)

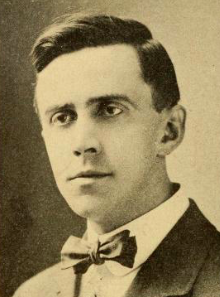

Member of the Massachusetts House of Representatives for the 20th Suffolk district
- In office 1914
- In office 1916

Personal details
- Born: September 26, 1884 Boston, Massachusetts, U.S.
- Died: May 18, 1966 (aged 81)
- Party: Democratic
- Education: Boston University Law School

John Justin Cummings (September 26, 1884 – May 18, 1966) was an American politician who served two terms in the Massachusetts House of Representatives and was the Democratic Party nominee for Lieutenant Governor of Massachusetts in 1924.

== Early life ==
Cummings was born in Boston on September 26, 1884. He graduated from Dorchester High School and Boston University School of Law.

== Politics ==
Cummings represented the 20th Suffolk district in the Massachusetts House of Representatives in the 1914 and 1916 Massachusetts legislatures. He was a member of the insurance committee in 1914 and the elections and legal affairs committees in 1916. In 1916, he lost the Democratic primary for the Massachusetts Senate in the Seventh Suffolk district to Charles S. Lawler.

Cummings served in the United States Army during World War I. He was on active duty with the field artillery replacement troops at Camp Zachary Taylor from August 29, 1918, to December 15, 1918. After the war, he received an officer's commission in the United States Army Reserve.

Cummings ran for Lieutenant Governor of Massachusetts in 1922 and finished third in the Democratic primary with 24% of the vote. He sought the office again in 1924 and defeated state senator William A. O'Hearn and former Massachusetts Attorney General Thomas J. Boynton in the Democratic primary. He lost the general election to Republican incumbent Frank G. Allen 648,373 votes to 413,898.

On June 6, 1926, Cummings announced that he would be a candidate in the 1926 Massachusetts gubernatorial election. He ran as a "wet" candidate and was the first candidate for major office in Massachusetts to oppose Prohibition since the passing of the Volstead Act and the ratification of the Eighteenth Amendment to the United States Constitution. His candidacy was opposed by party leaders, who did not want two Irish-American candidates at the top of statewide ticket (David I. Walsh was the presumptive nominee in that year's United States Senate special election). Cummings withdrew from the race on August 14, 1926, and endorsed William A. Gaston.

Cummings sought the Democratic nomination in the 1928 Massachusetts gubernatorial election, but was defeated in the primary by Charles H. Cole 81% to 19%. In the 1930 Massachusetts gubernatorial election, he finished third in the Democratic primary behind Joseph B. Ely and John F. Fitzgerald (who had withdrawn from the race), with 6% of the vote.

== Later life ==
Cummings worked as an attorney for the United States Department of Justice in Washington, D.C. and the United States Veterans Administration. He served in the Army during World War II. Cummings died on May 18, 1966.

Party political offices
Preceded by John F. Doherty	Democratic nominee for Lieutenant Governor of Massachusetts; 1924	Succeeded by Edmond P. Talbot
