= 1926 United States Senate special election in Massachusetts =

- November 2, 1926
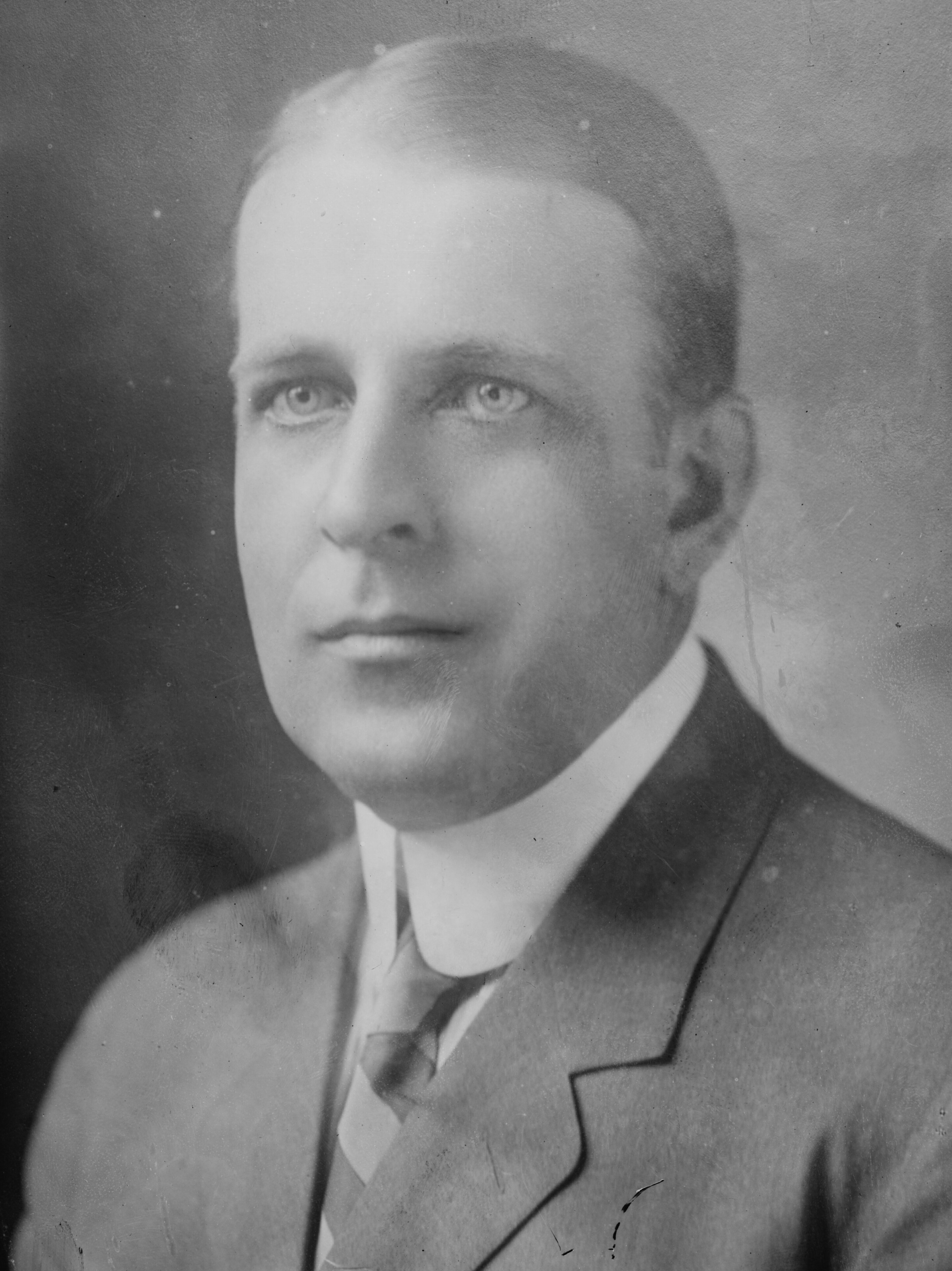

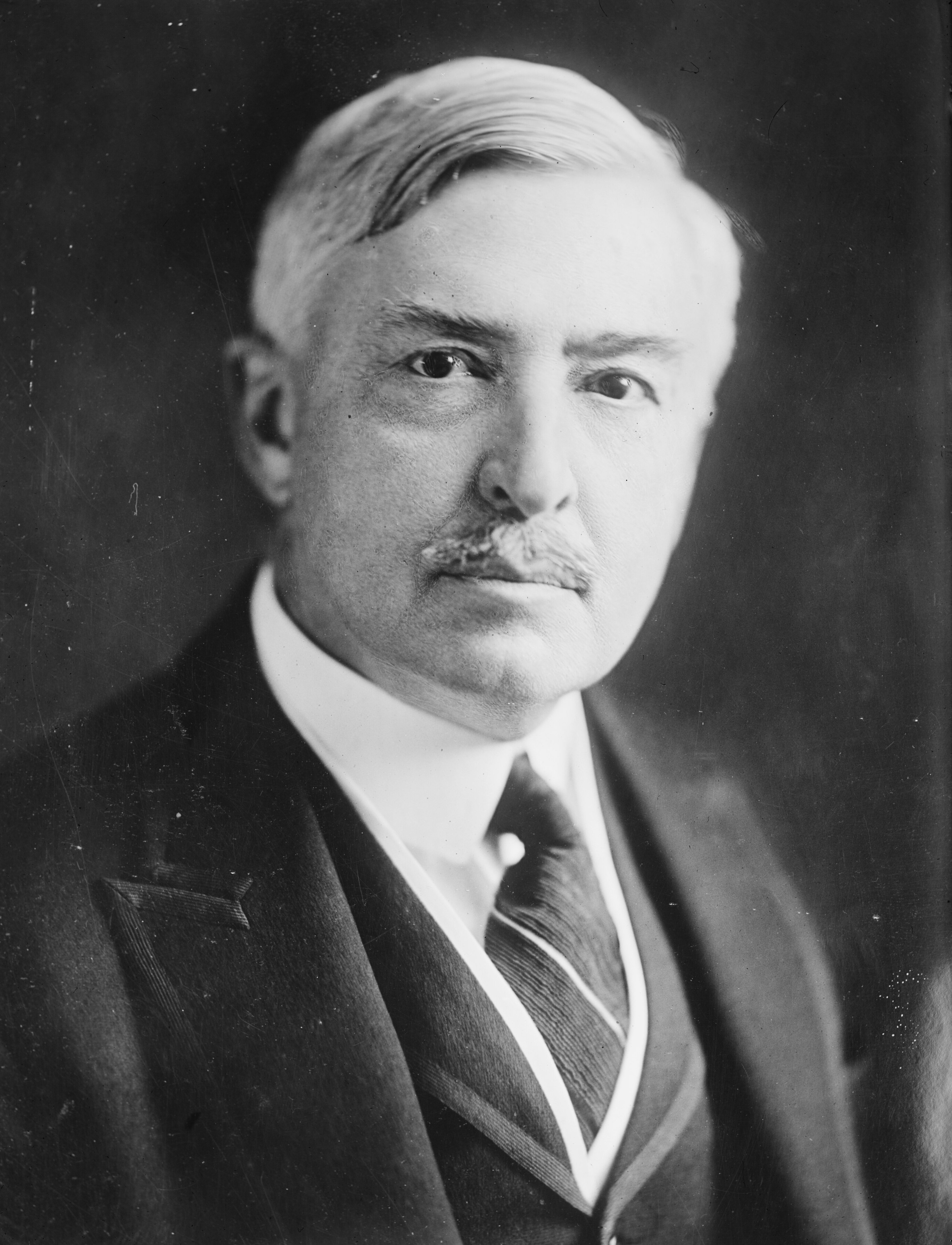
Nominee	David I. Walsh	William M. Butler
Party	Democratic	Republican
Popular vote	525,303	469,989
Percentage	52.01%	46.54%
- Walsh: 40–50% 50–60% 60–70% 70–80% 80–90% Butler: 40–50% 50–60% 60–70% 70–80% 80–90% >90%
U.S. senator before election
William M. Butler
Republican
Elected U.S. senator
David I. Walsh
Democratic

The 1926 United States Senate special election in Massachusetts was held on November 2, 1926.

Former Democratic Senator David I. Walsh defeated incumbent William Morgan Butler, a Republican who was appointed after the death of Republican Senator Henry Cabot Lodge.

Walsh returned to the U.S. Senate for a 2-year term. He had previously served in the Senate from 1919 to 1925. This was the first time since 1851 that Democrats held this Senate seat.

== Background ==
Senator Henry Cabot Lodge, whose sixth term was set to expire in 1929, died on November 9, 1924, after suffering a stroke. On November 13, 1924, Governor of Massachusetts Channing Cox appointed William M. Butler, the chair of the Republican National Committee, to fill the vacant seat until a successor could be duly elected. The special election for the remainder of Lodge's term was scheduled for November 2, 1926, concurrent with the next general election.

== Republican primary ==
=== Candidates ===
- William M. Butler, incumbent Senator and chairman of the Republican National Committee

==== Declined ====
- Channing Cox, former Governor of Massachusetts

=== Campaign ===
Butler formally announced his anticipated campaign for the special election on April 22, 1926, at a rally at Boston Symphony Hall, where he was endorsed by Governor Alvan T. Fuller, Senator Irvine Lenroot of Wisconsin, and Assistant Secretary of War Hanford MacNider. Most of the speakers connected Butler's campaign to the re-election prospects of President Calvin Coolidge, a close ally of Butler.

At the Republican convention on September 24, Butler was unopposed for the nomination and received the unanimous support of the delegates.

=== Results ===
Senator Butler was unopposed for the Republican nomination.

1926 Republican U.S. Senate primary
Party	Candidate	Votes	%
Republican	William Morgan Butler (incumbent)	209,836	100.0%
Write-in	All others	18	0.0%
Turnout		209,854	100.0%

== Democratic primary ==
=== Candidates ===
- David I. Walsh, former Senator

=== Results ===
Walsh was unopposed for the Democratic nomination.

1928 Democratic U.S. Senate primary results
Party	Candidate	Votes	%
Democratic	David I. Walsh	111,083	99.95%
Write-in	All others	58	0.05%
Turnout		111,141	100.0%

== General election ==
=== Candidates ===
- John J. Ballam, founding member of the Communist Party of America (Workers')
- William M. Butler, incumbent Senator (Republican)
- Washington Cook, Republican Executive Councillor and independent candidate for Senate in 1922 (Modification of Volstead Act)
- Alfred Baker Lewis, attorney, union organizer, and activist (Socialist)
- David I. Walsh, former U.S. Senator (Democratic)

=== Results ===
United States Senate election in Massachusetts, 1926
Party	Candidate	Votes	%	±%
Democratic	David I. Walsh	525,303	52.01%	▲5.34
Republican	William M. Butler (incumbent)	469,989	46.54%	▼1.05
Communist	John J. Ballam	5,167	0.51%	▲0.51
Modification of Volstead Act	Washington Cook	4,766	0.47%	▼0.43
Socialist	Alfred Baker Lewis	4,730	0.47%	▼0.87
Total votes		1,009,955	100.0%	
