= Strabo V. Claggett =

Strabo Vivian Claggett (May 26, 1892 – July 12, 1966) was an American financier and politician who was the Democratic Party's nominee for Massachusetts State Auditor in 1924 and 1926 and Lieutenant Governor of Massachusetts in 1930.

== Early life ==
Claggett was born on May 26, 1892, in Montevideo, Minnesota, to Strabo Francis and Rose Abbie (Phoenix) Claggett. He received his Bachelor's degree from Stanford University in 1914 and Bachelor of Laws from Harvard Law School in 1917. After graduating from Harvard, Claggett worked for the United States Food Administration under Herbert Hoover. From 1918 to 1919, he was an officer in the contract section of the United States Navy.

On June 10, 1919, Claggett married Nellie M. Charlson. They had three children.

== Business career ==
Claggett began working for Hemphill, Noyes & Co. in 1920 and became the firm's New England manager the following year. In 1923, he founded the investment firm of McClelland, Claggett & Co. with R. J. McClelland. McClelland managed the firm's New York office while Claggett ran the Boston office, which was located on Congress Street. The following year, he founded his own firm, Strabo V. Claggett & Co. He was associated with Charles F. Noyes & Co. from 1931 to 1932. From 1933 to 1936, he was a vice president of White, Claggett & Co. From 1936 to 1958, he was president of Whitney–Phoenix.

== Politics ==
The Democratic Party did not have any candidates for Massachusetts State Auditor in the 1924 election. Republican incumbent Alonzo B. Cook had come under fire from Clarence Ransom Edwards for not hiring qualified World War I veterans. He was also accused of religious prejudice in hiring by state representative Roland D. Sawyer and a legislative committee was formed to investigate Cook. Shortly before the party primary, United States Senator David I. Walsh and other party leaders convinced Claggett to run for the nomination as a sticker candidate, who received enough votes to appear on the November ballot. Claggett received support from a number of prominent Republicans and believed he would win the election. However, Cook was able to retain his office by 52,747 votes due to a poor Democratic turnout in Worcester and Essex counties. Cook and Claggett faced off again in 1926, and Cook was once again the victor, albeit by a smaller margin. Claggett was expected to challenge Cook for a third time in 1928, but Claggett was upset in the Democratic primary by Francis J. O'Gorman.

In 1930, Claggett ran for Lieutenant Governor of Massachusetts. He defeated Everett, Massachusetts mayor Michael C. O'Neill by 101 votes to win the Democratic nomination. He lost the general election to Republican incumbent William S. Youngman by over 19,000 votes. Claggett's aides alleged that there were inaccuracies in the initial count and pushed for a recount. However, on November 18, Claggett announced that the alleged errors would not be enough to change the outcome of the election and abandoned the recount bid. Claggett would later allege that an unsuccessful lawsuit brought against him shortly before the election had cost him the race and called it "the worst political trick ever perpetrated of a candidate for public office in Massachusetts.

Claggett chose not to run for public office in 1932, instead working at the Democratic National Committee's headquarters in New York City for the Franklin D. Roosevelt presidential campaign.

== Later life ==
During the 1930s, Claggett moved to New York City and became less involved with politics. He divorced in 1958 and on May 7, 1962, married Hazel K. Beery. In 1961, Claggett wrote the music for Here's to Harvard, a Harvard University fight song. The song was controversial due to a line, written by lyricist Alan H. Lutkus, which called rival Yale a "four-letter word".

Claggett died on July 12, 1966 at Beth Israel Hospital following a brief illness.

Party political offices
Preceded by Alice E. Cram	Democratic nominee for Massachusetts State Auditor; 1924, 1926	Succeeded by Francis J. O'Gorman
Preceded by John F. Malley	Democratic nominee for Lieutenant Governor of Massachusetts; 1930	Succeeded by John E. Swift
