= E. Mark Sullivan =

Edward Mark Sullivan (October 12, 1878 – May 25, 1947) was an American attorney who was corporation counsel of Boston, chairman of the Boston Finance Commission, and the grand exalted ruler of the Benevolent and Protective Order of Elks.

== Early life ==
Sullivan was born on October 12, 1878, in Ipswich, Massachusetts. His parents, Jeremiah and Julia Sullivan, were immigrants from County Kerry, Ireland and his father worked a gardener. He earned his Bachelor of Arts from Boston College in 1900 and his Juris Doctor from Harvard Law School in 1903. He paid for his education by working as a newspaper reporter for the Beverly Times.

== Career ==
In 1902, Sullivan entered the law office of Alden P. White in Salem, Massachusetts. He was admitted to the Essex County, Massachusetts bar on September 14, 1903. At the encouragement of Beverly Times publisher Albert Vittum, Sullivan opened a law office in Beverly, Massachusetts.

When the Ipswich District Court was formed in 1906, Sullivan was appointed by Governor Curtis Guild Jr. to be one of its first associate justices. In 1907, at the recommendation of U.S. Representative Augustus P. Gardner, Sullivan was appointed an assistant United States Attorney for the Boston office. In 1910, Gardner encouraged Sullivan to run against Essex County district attorney W. Scott Peters. Sullivan believed he was too inexperienced and another candidate, Henry Converse Atwill, was found to challenge Peters. He resigned from the U.S. attorney's office in November 1913.

Sullivan was a member of the Republican Party and a friend and supporter of Augustus P. Gardner and Henry Cabot Lodge. However, in the nonpartisan 1921 Boston mayoral election he backed James Michael Curley, a member of the Democratic Party. After John Andrew Sullivan declined the position, Curley appointed Sullivan corporation counsel of Boston. He resigned shortly before Curley's term ended in 1925.

Sullivan was a wet (anti-prohibition) candidate in the 1932 Massachusetts gubernatorial election. He finished third in the four candidate Republican primary with 4% of the vote.

In 1935, Curley, now Governor of Massachusetts, appointed Sullivan to chair the Boston Finance Commission. He was replaced in 1937 by Curley's successor, Charles F. Hurley, but remained on the commission as an unpaid member.

== Benevolent and Protective Order of Elks ==
Sullivan joined the Benevolent and Protective Order of Elks in 1903. In 1918, he was elected exalted ruler of the Boston Lodge. He became a district deputy in 1919 and a member of the Grand Lodge Convention Corporation in 1923. In 1942, he was elected to the organization's highest position, Grand Exalted Ruler.

== Personal life and death ==
In 1909, The Boston Globe announced Sullivan's engagement to Catherine M. Sullivan of Newton Upper Falls. The marriage never took place. In 1912, he married Catherine Hayes at St. Patrick's Church in Syracuse, New York. On the day of the ceremony, the Syracuse Police Department guarded the church to prevent one of Sullivan's former clients, Annie Mahoney, from interrupting the ceremony. According to The Boston Globe, Mahoney had traveled from Boston and attempted to stop the wedding by making criminal accusations against both Sullivan and Hayes, but "the police believed her insane". She did not show up to the church on the day of the wedding.

Sullivan died on May 25, 1947, at his home in Brighton, after a long illness. He was survived by his wife and four children.

Legal offices
Preceded by Arthur D. Hill	Boston Corporation Counsel; 1921–1925	Succeeded by Frank S. Deland
Political offices
Preceded by Jacob J. Kaplan	Chairman of the Boston Finance Commission; 1935–1937	Succeeded by David Lasker
Other offices
Preceded by John S. McClelland	Grand Exalted Ruler of the Benevolent and Protective Order of Elks; 1942	Succeeded by Frank J. Lonergan
