= 1930 Massachusetts gubernatorial election =

- November 4, 1930
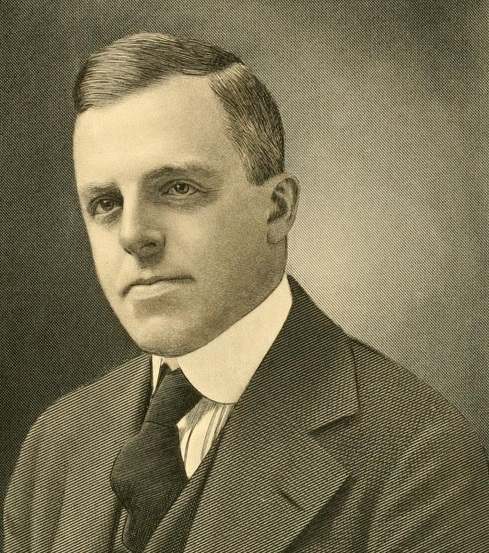

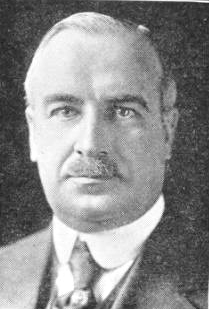
Nominee	Joseph B. Ely	Frank G. Allen
Party	Democratic	Republican
Popular vote	606,902	590,238
Percentage	49.54%	48.18%
- Ely: 40–50% 50–60% 60–70% 70–80% Allen: 40–50% 50–60% 60–70% 70–80% 80–90% >90%
Governor before election
Frank G. Allen
Republican
Elected Governor
Joseph B. Ely
Democratic

The 1930 Massachusetts gubernatorial election was held on November 4, 1930.

Incumbent Republican governor Frank G. Allen was defeated by Democrat Joseph B. Ely. This election marked the beginning of a new era for the Massachusetts Democratic Party, starting a string of eight consecutive years of Democratic governors, a streak later surpassed from 1974 until 1986.

== Republican primary ==
=== Candidates ===
- Frank G. Allen, incumbent governor
- John D. Devir, mayor of Malden

=== Results ===
1930 Massachusetts Republican primary
Party	Candidate	Votes	%
Republican	Frank G. Allen (incumbent)	311,025	92.56%
Republican	John D. Devir	24,972	7.43%
Write-in		22	0.00%
Total votes		336,019	100.00%

== Democratic primary ==
=== Candidates ===
- John J. Cummings, former representative and nominee for lieutenant governor in 1924
- Joseph B. Ely, candidate for governor in 1922
- John "Honey Fitz" Fitzgerald, former U.S. representative, mayor of Boston, and nominee for governor in 1922

=== Campaign ===
The Democratic primary featured a rematch of the 1922 primary between Joseph Ely and John Fitzgerald. This time, Ely won with 54.7% of the vote.

Fitzgerald was forced to withdraw late in the race due to illness, though his name remained on the ballot, and James Michael Curley encouraged a vote for Fitzgerald against the "anti-Irish" Ely. Ely had previously lost the nomination for lieutenant governor in 1926 to another Irish candidate who withdrew from the race, Harry Dooley.

=== Results ===
1930 Massachusetts Democratic primary
Party	Candidate	Votes	%
Democratic	Joseph B. Ely	117,548	54.68%
Democratic	John F. Fitzgerald (withdrew)	84,744	39.42%
Democratic	John J. Cummings	12,701	5.91%
Total votes		214,993	100.00%

== General election ==
=== Candidates ===
- John W. Aiken, Chelsea furniture repairman (Socialist Labor)
- Frank G. Allen, incumbent governor since 1929 (Republican)
- Harry J. Canter (Communist)
- Joseph B. Ely, former district attorney for the Western District of Massachusetts and candidate for governor in 1922 (Democratic)
- Alfred B. Lewis, Socialist Party of Massachusetts secretary and candidate for U.S. Senate in 1926 and 1928 (Socialist)

=== Results ===
Massachusetts gubernatorial election, 1930
Party	Candidate	Votes	%	±%
Democratic	Joseph B. Ely	606,902	49.54%	▲0.73
Republican	Frank G. Allen (incumbent)	590,238	48.18%	▼1.88
Socialist Labor	John W. Aiken	14,603	1.19%	▲1.10
Socialist	Alfred B. Lewis	8,222	0.67%	▲0.18
Communist	Harry J. Canter	5,051	0.41%	▲0.12
Write-in	All others	1	0.00%	Steady
Total votes		1,225,017	100.00%	
Democratic gain from Republican		Swing		

== See also ==
- 1929–1930 Massachusetts legislature
