= John F. Malley =

American government official and charity leader (1888–1943)

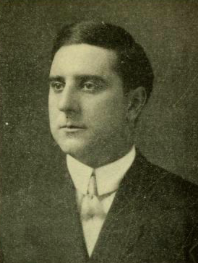

Collector of Internal Revenue for the District of Massachusetts
- In office 1913–1919
- Preceded by: James D. Gill
- Succeeded by: John Joseph Mitchell

Member of the Massachusetts Senate for the 1st Hampden district
- In office 1910–1911
- Preceded by: Thomas S. Walsh
- Succeeded by: Luke S. Stowe

Personal details
- Born: January 29, 1878 Springfield, Massachusetts, U.S.
- Died: May 16, 1966 (aged 88) Brookline, Massachusetts, U.S.
- Party: Democratic
- Education: Yale Law School

John F. Malley (January 29, 1878 – May 16, 1966) was an American government official and charity leader who was a member of the Massachusetts Senate and collector of internal revenue for the district of Massachusetts. In 1928, he was the Democratic Party's nominee for Lieutenant Governor of Massachusetts. He was grand exalted ruler of the Benevolent and Protective Order of Elks in 1927 and served as chairman of the Elks National Foundation from 1929 until his death.

== Early life ==
Malley was born in Springfield, Massachusetts, on January 29, 1878, to James and Mary (Connelly) Malley. He was educated in the Springfield Public Schools and graduated from Springfield High School in 1896. He studied law in the office of Daniel E. Leary and received his Bachelor of Laws degree from Yale Law School in 1902.

== Career ==
Malley passed the bar in 1902 and began practicing in Springfield. He became involved in Democratic Party politics and was elected to the Massachusetts Senate in 1910 in a special election to fill the vacancy caused by the death of Thomas S. Walsh. He was reelected that fall for the full 1911 Massachusetts legislature. He served on the counties, military affairs, and prisons committees in 1910 and the judiciary, rules, and constitutional amendments committees in 1911. He was defeated for reelection by Luke S. Stowe. In February 1913, Governor Eugene Foss appointed Malley as a special justice of the Springfield Police Court.

On October 19, 1913, president Woodrow Wilson nominated Malley for the position of collector of internal revenue for the district of Massachusetts. He took office on December 1, 1913 and oversaw the implementation of the Revenue Act of 1913. He left office on October 1, 1919 to return to the practice of law. He had an office on State Street in Boston with John N. O'Donohue and another in Springfield with his brother, Thomas C. Malley. Both offices focused on tax law.

In 1928, Malley was a candidate for Lieutenant Governor of Massachusetts. He easily defeated Charles S. Murphy in the Democratic primary to win the party's nomination. He lost the general election to Republican William S. Youngman 757,012 votes to 695,151. He ran again in 1930, but finished third in the Democratic primary behind Strabo V. Claggett and Michael C. O'Neill. He sought the office a third time in 1932 and finished last in the eighth candidate Democratic primary with 5% of the vote.

In 1934, Malley was appointed state director of the Federal Housing Administration by National Emergency Council head Donald Richberg. He remained in this position until his resignation in 1944.

== Benevolent and Protective Order of Elks ==
Malley was a member of the Springfield Lodge, No. 61 of the Benevolent and Protective Order of Elks. On July 12, 1927, he defeated Lee Meriwether 1290 votes to 226 to become the grand exalted ruler of the Elks. In February 1928, Malley announced plans for an endowment fund to finance charity work. He served as chairman of the endowment, known as the Elks National Foundation, from 1929 until his death in 1966. By the time of his death, the foundation had $16 million in assets.

== Personal life and death ==
On May 12, 1914, Malley married Marion L. Coogan in Pittsfield, Massachusetts. They had four children. Malley was a member of the Catholic Church. By 1926, the Malleys had moved from Springfield to Newton, Massachusetts.

Malley died on May 16, 1966 in Brookline, Massachusetts.

Party political offices
Preceded by Edmond P. Talbot	Democratic nominee for Lieutenant Governor of Massachusetts; 1928	Succeeded by Strabo V. Claggett
Other offices
Preceded by Charles H. Grakelow	Grand Exalted Ruler of the Benevolent and Protective Order of Elks; 1927	Succeeded by George Murray Hulbert
