= James Jackson (Massachusetts politician) =

American politician (1881–1952)

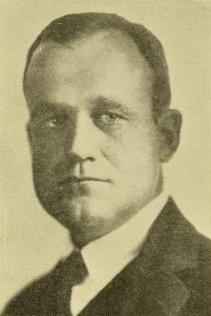

Treasurer and Receiver-General of Massachusetts
- In office September 8, 1920 – 1924
- Governor: Calvin Coolidge; Channing H. Cox
- Preceded by: Albert P. Langtry; Henry A. Wyman; John R. Macomber (Acting)
- Succeeded by: William S. Youngman

Personal details
- Born: April 21, 1881 Boston, Massachusetts, U.S.
- Died: June 23, 1952 (aged 71) Boston, Massachusetts, U.S.
- Party: Republican
- Education: Harvard University
- Profession: Banker

James Jackson (April 21, 1881 – June 23, 1952) was an American politician who served as Treasurer and Receiver-General of Massachusetts from 1920 to 1924.

== Education ==
Jackson received his preparatory education at the Groton School in Groton, Massachusetts after which he went to Harvard College from which he graduated in 1904.

== Early career ==
A year after he graduated from Harvard Jackson became associated with the banking firm of Lee, Higgoison and Co., remaining there until he became vice-president of the Paul Revere Trust Co. When the Paul Revere Trust Co. was merged into the State Street Trust Company, Jackson became a secretary of State Street, and manager of its Copley Square Branch.

== Public service career ==
Jackson, the New England Chairman of the Red Cross, announced his candidacy for State Treasurer on August 30, 1920. Jackson was appointed Treasurer and Receiver-General on September 8, 1920, following the resignation of Fred J. Burrell.

Jackson was one of the founders of the Sentinels of the Republic, an organization that opposed what it saw as the federal encroachment on the rights of the States and of the individual.

Instead of seeking reelection in 1924, Jackson ran for Governor of Massachusetts. He lost the Republican nomination to Lieutenant Governor. Alvan T. Fuller.

After his political career, Jackson worked as an arbitrator and a private trustee.

Party political offices
Preceded by Fred J. Burrell	Republican nominee for Treasurer and Receiver-General of Massachusetts; 1920, 1922	Succeeded by William S. Youngman
Political offices
Preceded by Fred J. Burrell	Treasurer and Receiver-General of Massachusetts; 1920–1924	Succeeded by William S. Youngman
