= Edward B. Cole =

US Marine Corps officer

Edward Ball Cole
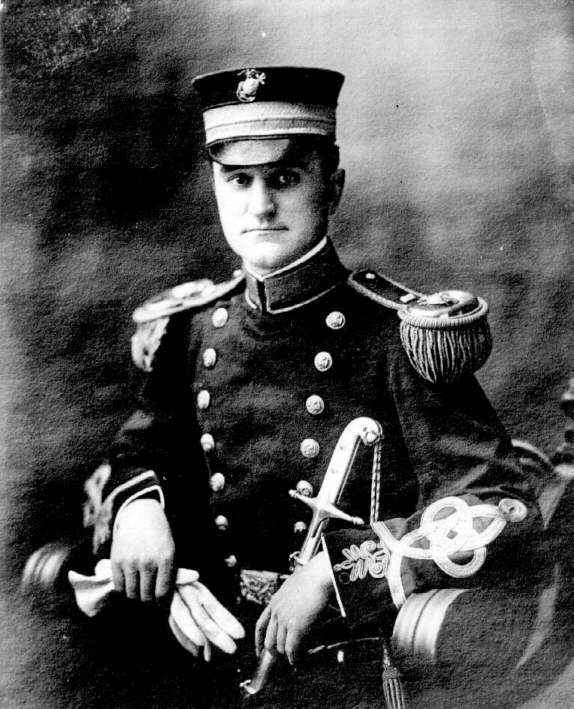
- Edward B. Cole
- Born: September 23, 1879; Boston, Massachusetts
- Died: June 18, 1918 (aged 38) near Coulommiers, France
- Burial place: Aisne-Marne Cemetery, Belleau, France
- Relatives: Brother — Gen Charles H. Cole; Father —Charles H. Cole, Sr.
- Military career
- Allegiance: United States of America
- Branch: United States Marine Corps
- Rank: Major
- Nickname: "Ned"
- Commands: 6th Machine Gun Battalion, 4th Brigade of Marines
- Conflicts: World War I: Battle of Belleau Wood (DOW)
- Awards: Navy Cross; Distinguished Service Cross; Légion d'honneur Croix de Guerre

Edward Ball Cole (September 23, 1879 - June 18, 1918) was an officer in the United States Marine Corps during World War I. He was a leading expert on machine guns; he was killed in action during the Battle of Belleau Wood.

== Biography ==
Cole was born in on September 23, 1879, in Boston, Massachusetts, to Charles and Mary Lyon (Ball) Cole. He graduated from Harvard University in 1902, where he was a member of the Owl Club.

Cole was one of the United States' leading experts on machine guns and had published several articles and a book on the subject — Field Book for Machine Gunners (1917). He received a direct commission in the Marine Corps in World War I.

Cole received the Navy Cross and the Distinguished Service Cross for heroism during the Battle of Belleau Wood in which he was mortally wounded on June 10, 1918. On that day, while he was leading an attack on enemy machine guns a German hand grenade wounded him in the foot. When a second grenade landed in front of him, he grabbed it to throw it back and protect his men — it exploded in his hand. He crawled back to his men under rifle fire. He died from his wounds on June 18, 1918, in a field hospital near Coulommiers, France, with his brother, U.S. Army Brigadier General Charles H. Cole at his side. He is buried in the Aisne-Marne Cemetery, Belleau, France.

His decorations included the Navy Cross, the Distinguished Service Cross; as well as the French Légion d'Honneur and the Croix de Guerre.

== Citations ==
For his actions on June 10, 1918, during the Battle of Belleau Wood, Cole received both the Navy Cross and the Army Distinguished Service Cross.

Cole's Navy Cross citation reads:

In the Bois de Belleau, France, on June 10, 1918, his unusual heroism in leading his company under heavy fire enabled it to fight with exceptional effectiveness. He personally worked fearlessly until he was mortally wounded.

His Distinguished Service Cross citation reads:

In the Bois de Belleau, on June 10th 1918, displayed extraordinary heroism in organizing positions, rallying his men and disposing of his guns, continuing to expose himself fearlessly until he fell. He suffered the loss of his right hand and received wounds in upper arm and both thighs.”

== Namesake ==
The destroyer USS Cole (DD-155) was named for him. (The guided missile destroyer USS Cole (DDG-67) was named for a different Cole: Darrell S. Cole.)

== See also ==
- Louis Cukela, recipient of both the U.S. Army and U.S. Navy Medal of Honor for Belleau Wood
- Battle of Belleau Wood
