= Charles H. Cole (banker) =

American banker

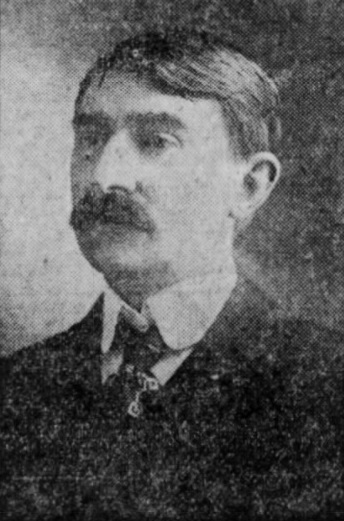
The Boston Globe, August 15, 1906

Charles H. Cole (January 5, 1847 – August 14, 1906) was an American banker who served as president of the Globe National Bank of Boston from 1897 to 1899. He pleaded guilty to willful misapplication of bank funds and served six years in jail.

== Early life ==
Cole was born on July 5, 1847, in Plymouth, Massachusetts, to Job and Hannah (Frye) Cole. At the age of 5 his family moved to South Boston. In 1862, Cole began his business career as an office boy in a private banking house.

== Business career ==
=== Globe National Bank ===
In 1868, Cole went to work as a clerk at the Globe National Bank. He rose through the company over the next 13 years and in 1881 he was made cashier. As cashier, Cole was given authority greatly beyond what was normal for the office, especially in the matter of loans. He was permitted to exercise his judgement in areas that were usually decided by the president. He eventually assumed practical control of the bank. In 1894 he became the bank's vice president and was given a seat on its board of directors. In 1897 he became bank president following the death of Charles E. Stevens.

=== Other endeavors ===
Cole was an incorporator and director of the United States Oil Company, a business that ran profitable oil wells in Virginia. He was reported to have invested heavily in the business and his personal wealth grew rapidly as a result. In 1896, Cole became director of a mining company. The business was a success and he increased his wealth by $1.5 million. In 1898 he purchased a large amount of stock in the American Lead and Zinc Company, which owned mines around Joplin, Missouri. The company was initially successful, but its value dropped significantly due to a drop in the price of zinc. In 1899, Cole became involved with the North American Gold Dredging Company. This business was not a success. That same year, he was an incorporator of the United States Mining Company, which mined copper, and the Santa Fe Gold and Copper Mining Company.

== Personal life ==
In 1870, Cole married Mary Lyon Ball. The couple had three children, Charles Jr., George, and Edward. The family lived in South Boston until 1890, when Cole moved to a modest home in Hingham, Massachusetts. In 1893 he purchased a large Hingham estate that neighbored John Davis Long's. Cole reconstructed the interior of the house, purchased land surrounding the property, and built a conservatory and stable, where he kept six to eight horses and a number of fine carriages.

== Municipal government ==
In 1895, Boston Mayor Edwin Upton Curtis appointed Cole to a commission investigating municipal finances. In 1897, he was appointed to Boston's sinking fund commission by Mayor Josiah Quincy. Cole resigned in 1899, as he was planning to take a trip out west.

== Conviction ==
In September 1898, special bank examiner Daniel G. Wing found many discrepancies in the bank's accounts. Comptroller of the Currency Charles G. Dawes threatened to shut down the bank unless something was done to remedy the situation. Cole and some of the directors went to Washington, D.C., and assured Dawes that they would resolve the situation personally by eliminating some of the objectionable features instituted by Cole. Dawes demanded that Cole step down, and after staying on a short period to assist his fellow directors, Cole retired from the bank on November 6, 1899. The reason for his leaving was given as a difference of opinion between him and the directors over bank policy. At the time of his retirement, Cole was estimated to be worth nearly $2 million. All of his assents were turned over to the bank so that it could meet its obligations.

On December 23, 1899, Cole was arrested in Redondo Beach, California, for embezzlement and misapplication of funds. He returned to Boston on January 5, 1900, in the custody of the United States Marshal Service. He pleaded not guilty and was released on $50,000 bail. On March 6, he was indicted by a grand jury on 16 counts of false entries in the books of the Globe National Bank and 9 counts of willful misapplication of the bank's funds.

On April 14, 1900, Cole pled guilty to three of the counts against him. These charges were willful misapplication of a stock certificate of the U.S. Mining Company (valued at $400,000), willful misapplication of 253 bonds issued by the Niagara Mining and Smelting Company (valued at $500 each), and misapplication of a check and money order for the payment of $290,000 and a check for $8,604.70. On May 14, Cole was sentenced to eight years in prison by Francis Cabot Lowell. He was sent to the Greenfield Jail in Greenfield, Massachusetts.

In 1904, Cole applied for a presidential pardon. His supporters included former United States Secretary of the Navy John Davis Long, all of Boston's congressional members, every former Mayor of the city, and nearly ever banker and municipal official from Boston. U.S. Attorney Boyd B. Jones, who had prosecuted Cole and Judge Lowell recommended that Cole's application be denied. Attorney General Philander C. Knox found the Cole's sentence was not excessive and advised president Theodore Roosevelt to the deny the application. Roosevelt followed Knox's advise on June 24, denied Cole's pardon.

== Release from jail and death ==
On April 27, 1906, President Roosevelt signed into law an amendment that increased the amount of Good conduct time in federal cases. Consequently, Cole was released from jail on April 30, 1906.

On August 14, 1906, Cole died in Boston from acute general tuberculosis he contracted while in prison.
