= USS Cole (DD-155) =

Wickes-class destroyer

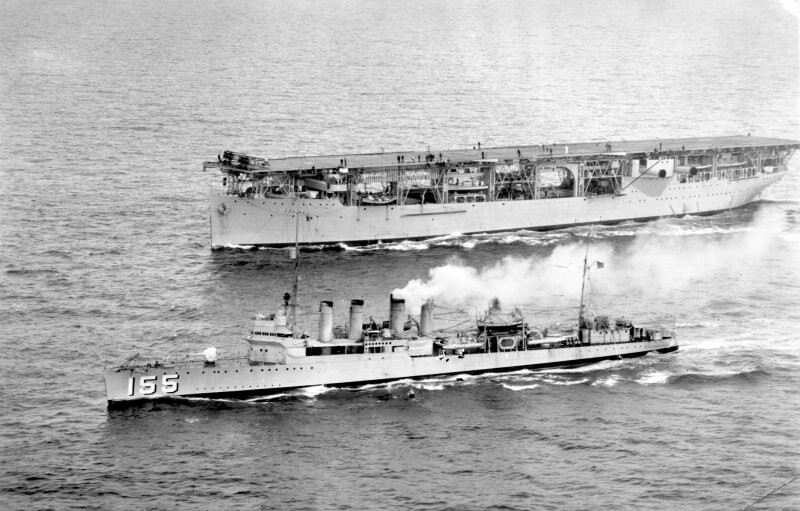
- USS Cole and USS Langley underway in the South Pacific.

History

United States
- Name: Cole
- Namesake: Edward B. Cole
- Builder: William Cramp & Sons, Philadelphia
- Yard number: 470
- Laid down: 25 June 1918
- Launched: 11 January 1919
- Commissioned: 19 June 1919
- Decommissioned: 10 July 1922
- Identification: DD-155
- Commissioned: 1 May 1930
- Decommissioned: 1 November 1945
- Reclassified: AG-116 30 June 1945
- Stricken: 16 November 1945
- Fate: Sold for scrapping, 6 October 1947

General characteristics
- Class & type: Wickes-class destroyer
- Displacement: 1,090 tons
- Length: 314 ft 5 in (95.8 m)
- Beam: 31 ft 8 in (9.7 m)
- Draft: 9 ft (2.7 m)
- Propulsion: 24,200 shp (18,046 kW); Geared turbines, 2 screws
- Speed: 35 knots (65 km/h; 40 mph)
- Complement: 122 officers and enlisted
- Armament: 4 × 4 in (102 mm) guns, 2 × 3 in (76 mm) guns, 12 × 21 in (533 mm) torpedo tubes

USS Cole (DD-155) was a Wickes-class destroyer in the United States Navy during World War II, later reclassified as AG-116. It was named for Edward B. Cole, a United States Marine Corps officer who died as a result of the wounds he received at the Battle of Belleau Wood.

Cole was launched 11 January 1919, by William Cramp & Sons Ship and Engine Building Company of Philadelphia sponsored by Mrs. E. B. Cole, and commissioned 19 June 1919.

== Service history ==
Cole sailed from New York 30 June 1919, to join U.S. Naval Forces in Turkish waters. For the next year they aided in the evacuation of refugees fleeing turmoil and war in the Middle East and showed the flag in the eastern Mediterranean and Black Seas, returning to New York City on 4 June 1920. It cruised in East Coast and Caribbean waters until decommissioned at Philadelphia Naval Shipyard on 10 July 1922.

Recommissioned on 1 May 1930, Cole joined the Scouting Fleet in the Atlantic. Once again it cruised along the east coast and in the Caribbean and took part in training exercises. From 22 October 1932 to 24 March 1933, Cole was in reduced commission at Norfolk Naval Shipyard as part of a rotating reserve squadron. On 4 April 1933, the destroyer participated in the fruitless search for survivors of the wreck of the airship Akron. From 3 February to 14 August 1934, the ship was again reduced to the rotating reserve squadron.

On 15 August 1934, Cole was assigned to the Scouting Force in the Pacific, and following maneuvers in the Caribbean reached its new base at San Diego, California on 9 November. It remained in the Pacific until 24 May 1936, and then reported to New York as a Naval Reserve training ship. She arrived at Philadelphia Naval Shipyard on 25 September and was decommissioned there on 7 January 1937.

Recommissioned 16 October 1939, Cole joined the Neutrality Patrol in the Atlantic. From 10 June 1941, she escorted convoys to Newfoundland and Iceland making five such voyages by 28 January 1942. From 14 March to 28 September, the destroyer patrolled and escorted convoys along the east coast, making one convoy run to the Virgin Islands. She put to sea from Norfolk, Virginia on 24 October for the invasion of North Africa on 8 November during which she landed 175 men of the 47th Infantry under fire on a pier at Safi, Morocco. Cole received the Presidential Unit Citation for her performance in this mission. Returning to Boston on 1 December, she resumed convoy duty and between 18 December 1942 and 16 February 1943, she operated between the east coast, Newfoundland, and Nova Scotia, then made a voyage to Gibraltar in March. The destroyer returned to the Mediterranean, reaching Mers El Kébir, Algeria on 23 May.

Along with patrol and escort duties in the Western Mediterranean, Cole took part in the Allied Invasion of Sicily on 10 July 1943, acting with a British submarine as a beach identification group, and later guarded transports during the assault on Salerno on 9 September. She returned to Charleston, South Carolina for overhaul on 24 December, after which she resumed convoy escort duty along the east coast and in the Caribbean, making one voyage to Casablanca in March 1944. On 3 December 1944, she began duty as a plane guard for aircraft carriers conducting air operations out of Quonset Point, Rhode Island, which continued until 31 August 1945. She was reclassified AG-116 on 30 June 1945. Cole was decommissioned on 1 November 1945, and sold 6 October 1947.

== Awards ==
In addition to the Presidential Unit Citation, Cole received three battle stars for World War II service.

== Convoys escorted ==
Convoy	Escort Group	Dates	Notes
HX 159		10-19 Nov 1941	from Newfoundland to Iceland prior to US declaration of war
ON 39		29 Nov-4 Dec 1941	from Iceland to Newfoundland prior to US declaration of war
HX 166		25-31 Dec 1941	from Newfoundland to Iceland
ON 53		9-14 Jan 1942	from Iceland to Newfoundland
HX 171		22-24 Jan 1942	from Newfoundland to Iceland
ON 89	MOEF group A1	23–26 April 1942	from Northern Ireland to Iceland
ON 126		8-10 Sep 1942	from Iceland to Newfoundland

== In popular culture ==
In June 2017, the ship's bell from Cole was found in New Hampshire during an episode of the History cable television channel's series, American Pickers. It was subsequently donated to the Navy Museum in Washington D.C.
