= John F. Doherty =

American politician (1881–1944)

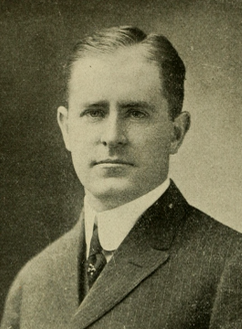

Boston City Collector
- In office 1934–1938
- Preceded by: William M. McMorrow
- Succeeded by: Merritt Thompson

Member of the Massachusetts House of Representatives for the 9th Bristol district
- In office 1913–1915
- Preceded by: William H. Gifford
- Succeeded by: Joseph E. Freeling / Isaac U. Wood ^{1}

Personal details
- Born: June 9, 1881 Wareham, Massachusetts, U.S.
- Died: April 27, 1944 (aged 62) Boston, Massachusetts, U.S.
- Party: Democratic
- Education: Boston University School of Law

John F. Doherty (June 9, 1881 – April 27, 1944) was an American politician who was a member of the Massachusetts House of Representatives from 1913 to 1915 and was the Democratic Party nominee for Lieutenant Governor of Massachusetts in 1922.

== Early life ==
Doherty was born in Wareham, Massachusetts on June 9, 1881. His father was in the brewing business and the family moved to Fall River, Massachusetts in 1897. Doherty attended Rogers & Allen's School of Business and graduated from the Boston University School of Law in 1912. During his tenure in the House, Doherty worked as an accountant and auditor.

== Politics ==
Doherty represented the 9th Bristol district in the Massachusetts House of Representatives from 1913 to 1915. He was a member of the committee on banks and banking and the legal affairs committee during his first two terms. In 1915, he was a member of the committee on the judiciary. He also served as a personal representative of Governor David I. Walsh on the House floor. He gained notoriety though his speeches on matters relating to Fall River, the Blue sky law (which he supported), and the repeal of the Suction Shuttle law (which he opposed).

After leaving the House, Doherty moved to Boston's West End. He had a law office in Barrister's Hall. In 1922, he sought the Democratic nomination for Lieutenant Governor. He received the endorsement of West End political boss Martin Lomasney, who backed Doherty over another political ally, Michael A. O'Leary. He won the primary with 41% of the vote to O'Leary's 35% (a third candidate, John J. Cummings, received the remaining 24%). He lost the general election to Republican incumbent Alvan T. Fuller 484,854 votes to 356,057.

In 1934, Doherty, now residing in Hyde Park, was appointed Boston's city collector by mayor Frederick Mansfield. He was not reappointed by Mansfield's successor, Maurice J. Tobin, and he left office in 1938.

== Later life ==
Doherty spent his later years residing on The Fenway. He died on April 27, 1944, at Faulkner Hospital in Jamaica Plain.

== Notes ==
1. The 9th Bristol district sent two representatives to the Massachusetts House of Representatives during Doherty's tenure. In 1916, Doherty and Edmond P. Talbot were succeeded by Joseph E. Freeling and Isaac U. Wood.

Party political offices
Preceded by Marcus A. Coolidge	Democratic nominee for Lieutenant Governor of Massachusetts; 1922	Succeeded by John J. Cummings
