= Private trustee =

Agreement between trust settler and trustee

In the United States a private trustee is a position set up through a trust indenture. It is a private agreement, between the settlor of a trust and the trustee. This makes both the trust and the trustee private. This arrangement differs from a bank trustee or a corporate trustee, both of which mainly focus on legalities and accounting in the public arena.

A private trustee works for and with the family and beneficiaries, becoming familiar with their needs and wishes. Thus, the private trustee is more likely to move the trust group forward by keeping these priorities in mind. Usually the settlor and the trustee work closely together establishing investments for the trust.

Even though this position was established long before 1634, no official records can be found prior to this date.
