= Michael C. O'Neill =

American politician (1888–1943)

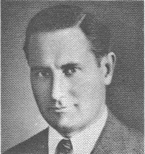

Mayor of Everett, Massachusetts
- In office 1930–1934
- Preceded by: James A. Roche
- Succeeded by: James A. Roche

Personal details
- Born: October 24, 1888 North Adams, Massachusetts, U.S.
- Died: April 12, 1943 (aged 54) Boston, Massachusetts, U.S.
- Party: Democratic
- Education: Harvard College

Michael Cornelius O'Neill (October 24, 1888 – April 12, 1943) was an American politician who was mayor of Everett, Massachusetts from 1930 to 1934.

== Early life and education ==
O'Neill was born on October 24, 1888, in North Adams, Massachusetts, to Michael C. and Susan L. (Carroll) O'Neill. He graduated from The English High School and earned his Bachelor of Science from Harvard College in 1912. After graduating, he earned his engineering licensure and worked on construction projects at Massachusetts General Hospital, Quincy Market, Hingham Naval Ammunition Depot, and South Station. Outside of Boston, he performed engineering work for the Grand Trunk Railway and Boston and Maine Railroad. He left engineering in 1918 to become submaster at Everett High School.

== Politics ==
In 1929, O'Neill challenged Everett's mayor James A. Roche. In his first ever bid for elected office, he defeated the two-term incumbent 8,777 votes to 5,773. He was elected in a three-way contest receiving 5,754 votes to former mayor Lester Chisholm's 5,005. Roche, who ran as a sticker candidate, received 3,603.

In 1930, O'Neill was a candidate for Lieutenant Governor of Massachusetts. He finished second to Strabo V. Claggett in the Democratic primary by 101 votes. He ran again in 1932 and finished third in the eight-candidate Democratic primary with 12% of the vote.

On August 4, 1933, O'Neill was indicted by a Middlesex County grand jury on charges of conspiring to promote a foreign lottery for money. According to the government, O'Neill had conspired with two known racketeers to promote a $3 million Irish sweepstakes lottery. The group was never authorized by the Irish government and the contest was not connected to the legitimate Irish Hospitals' Sweepstake. O'Neill was allegedly present at meetings where the scheme was planned, paid to have the tickets printed, and was present when the office that served as the lottery's headquarters was rented. One of the racketeers died under suspicious circumstances before the indictment and the other fled Ireland after he was charged in that country. That October, O'Neill was defeated for reelection after finishing third behind former mayors James A. Roche and William E. Weeks in the preliminary election. On December 26, 1933, the district attorney's office entered a Nolle prosequi declaration of O'Neill's indictment. Although the government believed O'Neill was guilty, they felt his intentions were "charitable" and his defeat in the 1933 election was ample punishment. O'Neill disagreed with this decision, as he maintained his innocence and believed that the government's insistence of his guilt in the Nolle prosequi had hindered his political and business prospects. In 1935, he unsuccessfully attempted to indict himself, as he believed as trial was the only way to clear his name.

After leaving the Mayor's office, O'Neill served as director of the Massachusetts Department of Public Utilities's division of smoke abatement.

== Personal life and death ==
In April 1917, O'Neill married Neva M. Bressler of Watertown, Massachusetts. They had five sons. O'Neill died on April 12, 1943, at Peter Bent Brigham Hospital after a cerebral hemorrhage.
