= Charles H. Cole =

American military officer

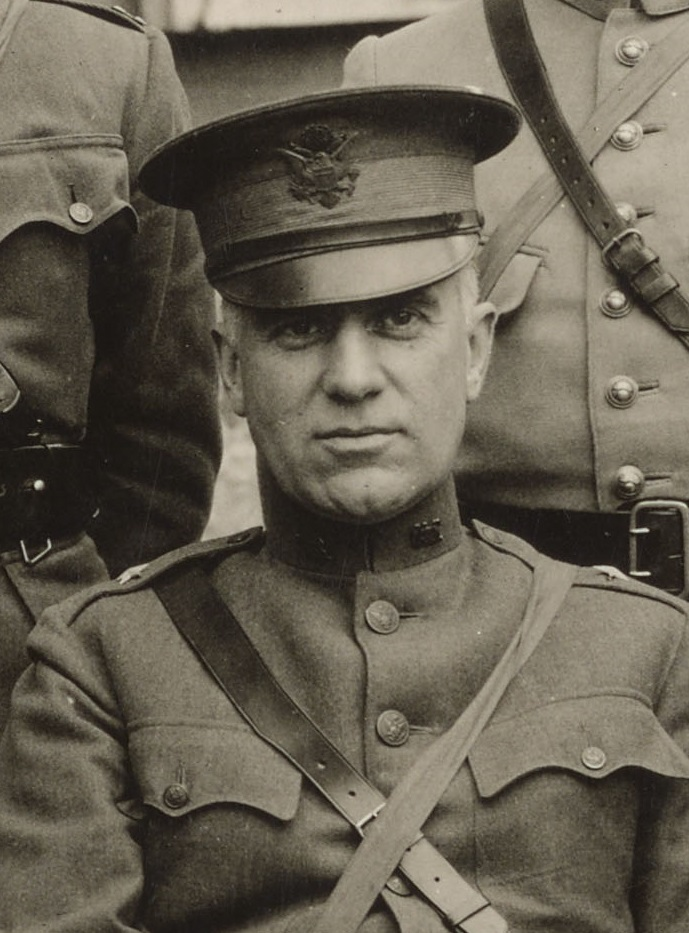
- Cole in uniform, May 1918

Adjutant General of Massachusetts
- In office 1936–1939
- Preceded by: William I. Rose
- Succeeded by: Edgar C. Erickson
- In office 1914–1916
- Preceded by: Gardner W. Pearson
- Succeeded by: Gardner W. Pearson

Boston Fire Commissioner
- In office 1912–1914
- Preceded by: Charles Dudley Daly
- Succeeded by: John Grady

Personal details
- Born: October 30, 1871 South Boston, Massachusetts, U.S.
- Died: November 13, 1952 (aged 81) Chelsea, Massachusetts, U.S.
- Party: Democratic Party
- Spouse: Grace F. Blanchard (1910–1949; her death)
- Awards: Croix de Guerre

Military service
- Allegiance: United States
- Branch/service: Massachusetts Volunteer Militia
- Years of service: 1890–1916; 1917–1938
- Rank: General

Charles Henry Cole (October 30, 1871 – November 13, 1952) was an American military and government official who served as commissioner of the Boston police and fire departments as well as Adjutant General of Massachusetts. During World War I, he commanded the 52nd Infantry Brigade of the 26th Infantry Division. He was the Democratic nominee in the 1928 Massachusetts gubernatorial election.

== Early life ==
Cole was born on October 30, 1871, in South Boston, Massachusetts to Charles H. Cole Sr. a Boston financial leader, and his wife, Mary Lyon (Ball) Cole. He had two brothers, Edward B. Cole, a United States Marine Corps officer and George Cole, a Buffalo businessman. Cole was a graduate of The English High School.

On October 14, 1890, he enlisted in the 1st Corps. of Cadets and was assigned to Co. A. After going through every grade of noncommissioned office, Cole was made a 2nd lieutenant on April 10, 1900, and assigned to Co B. He was promoted to 1st lieutenant on January 8, 1901. In 1904, Cole served as captain of the Massachusetts Militia rifle team that competed at the national marksmanship competition at Fort Riley.

Cole was also an active member of the Massachusetts Democratic Party. In 1904 he served as chairman of the executive committee of the Democratic Club of Massachusetts. In 1905, Cole was appointed inspector general of rifle practice for the Massachusetts Volunteer Militia by Governor William Lewis Douglas. Later that year, Douglas recommended Cole for the position of Massachusetts Democratic Party chairman.

Professionally, Cole was a clerk, cashier, treasurer, and director for several mining companies. He also ran a real estate and brokerage business.

== Police and fire commissioner ==
On April 12, 1905, Cole was nominated as chairman of the Boston Police Commission by Governor Douglas. His nomination to the police board resulted in him dropping out of contention for the party chairmanship. He was confirmed by the Massachusetts Governor's Council and took office on May 1, 1905. In 1906, the three-person police commission was abolished by the Massachusetts General Court in favor of a sole commissioner. Cole's tenure ended when Commissioner Stephen O'Meara took office in June of that year.

In 1910 Cole married Grace F. Blanchard. That same year he was promoted to major in the Massachusetts Militia.

On January 26, 1912, Boston Mayor John F. Fitzgerald dismissed Fire Commissioner Charles Dudley Daly and named Cole as his successor. He took office on February 12, 1912. During his tenure, Cole added many pieces of motor apparatus to the department and served as chairman of the National Fire Protection Association. He resigned in 1914 so that Fitzgerald's successor, James Michael Curley, could appoint his own commissioner.

== Adjutant General ==
On May 26, 1914, Cole was appointed Adjutant General of Massachusetts by Governor David I. Walsh. He was retained by Walsh's Republican successor, Samuel W. McCall.

In June 1916, Cole led the Massachusetts Militia when it was mobilized to the Mexican border. From June 18 to June 20, Cole went 48 hours without sleep. From June 20 to June 28 he slept only one-half to three hours a night. On August 2, 1916, Cole retired from the Militia with the rank of brigadier general.

== First run for governor ==
Following his resignation, Cole ran for Governor of Massachusetts. He lost the Democratic nomination to State Treasurer Frederick Mansfield.

== World War I ==
After the United States entered World War I, in April 1917, Cole reenlisted in the United States Army as a private. He was promoted to captain a day later and served as adjutant to Colonel Edward Lawrence Logan. In August 1917 he was appointed to his previous rank of brigadier general. He was commander of the 52nd Brigade of the 26th Division, under Major General Clarence R. Edwards. He was removed from command for "permitting fraternization with the enemy, and when ordered to stop it failing to do so". General John J. Pershing, commanding the American Expeditionary Forces (AEF), found that the case against Cole did not warrant his removal and returned him to his former brigade. Cole was in a number of major battles including the battles of Chateau-Thierry, St. Mihiel and Meuse-Argonne.

Fighting ended on November 11, 1918 and Cole departed France on March 21, 1919. He arrived in New York on March 30 and proceeded to Boston by train. Upon his return to Boston he was tasked with assisting with homecoming celebrations by the 26th Division's new commander, Major General Harry C. Hale.

== Later runs for Governor ==
After the war Cole returned to politics; serving as a delegate from Massachusetts to the Democratic National Conventions of 1924 and 1928.

In 1928, Cole was the Democratic nominee for governor of Massachusetts. He lost to Republican Frank G. Allen 50% to 49%. Following his defeat, Cole was appointed as a trustee of the Boston Elevated Railway by outgoing Governor Alvan T. Fuller.

In 1932, he again was a delegate to the Democratic Convention.

Cole ran again for governor in 1934. This time he was defeated in the Democratic primary by James Michael Curley 64% to 30%.

== Later career ==
In September 1934, Cole was offered the position of Public Safety Commissioner by departing Governor Joseph B. Ely. Cole declined, as he did not want a full-time appointment. Instead, Cole accepted appointment as chairman of the state racing commission. He resigned from the commission on February 27, 1935, due a dispute with Curley over the Governor's insistence that his office make appointments. His departure came soon after the commission voted 2 to 1 to remove its assistant secretary, with Cole voting in the dissent. After leaving the racing commission, Cole applied for the position of Boston Postmaster. Cole had the highest score certified by the Civil Service Commission, but was passed over in favor of Curley's candidate, William F. Tague.

On November 18, 1936, Governor-elect Charles F. Hurley announced that his first appointment would be Charles H. Cole as adjutant general. While serving as adjutant general from 1937 to 1939, Cole was also the state's chief of staff. In 1938, Hurley appointed Cole to the State Commission on Labor and Industries. He was reappointed by Governors Leverett Saltonstall and Maurice J. Tobin. In 1947, Cole announced that he would not seek reappointment due to his opposition to Governor Robert F. Bradford's proposal for a new state conciliation agency.

Cole died on November 13, 1952. He was predeceased by his wife. He was interred at Hingham Cemetery.

Party political offices
Preceded by William A. Gaston	Democratic nominee for Governor of Massachusetts; 1928	Succeeded by Joseph B. Ely
