= Boston Finance Commission =

City of Boston agency

The Boston Finance Commission (known as FinComm) is an agency that monitors finances for the city of Boston. It is concerned with appropriations, loans, expenditures, accounts, and methods of administration affecting the city of Boston and Suffolk County (of which Boston is the county seat).

== Public meetings ==
Public meetings of the FinComm are open to observers interested in municipal government.
