= William S. Youngman =

American politician (1872–1934)

William Sterling Youngman
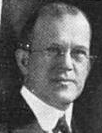

50th Lieutenant Governor of Massachusetts
- In office 1929–1933
- Governor: Frank G. Allen; Joseph B. Ely
- Preceded by: Frank G. Allen
- Succeeded by: Gaspar G. Bacon

42nd Treasurer and Receiver-General of Massachusetts
- In office 1925–1928
- Governor: Alvan T. Fuller
- Preceded by: James Jackson
- Succeeded by: John W. Haigis

Member of the Massachusetts State Senate Norfolk and Suffolk District
- In office 1923–1924
- Preceded by: Wesley E. Monk
- Succeeded by: Erland F. Fish

Personal details
- Born: February 2, 1872 Williamsport, Pennsylvania, U.S.
- Died: April 25, 1934 (aged 62) Brookline, Massachusetts, U.S.
- Party: Republican
- Children: William Sterling Youngman Jr.
- Education: Harvard College; A.B. 1895; Harvard Law School; L.L.B. 1898
- Profession: Attorney

Military service
- Branch/service: United States Army
- Years of service: 1898; 1918
- Rank: Captain
- Battles/wars: Spanish–American War; World War I

William Sterling Youngman (February 2, 1872 – April 25, 1934) was an American politician who served as a Massachusetts State Senator, the Treasurer and Receiver-General of Massachusetts and as the 50th lieutenant governor of Massachusetts from 1929 to 1933.

Youngman attended Harvard, where he was a member of the debate team.

Youngman served with a troop of Pennsylvania Cavalry during the Spanish–American War; he also served in World War I.

In 1932 Youngman was the Republican nominee for Governor of Massachusetts, he lost that election by about 150,000 votes to the incumbent Democratic Governor Joseph B. Ely.

Political offices
Preceded by Frank G. Allen	Lieutenant Governor of Massachusetts; 1929 – 1933	Succeeded by Gaspar G. Bacon
Preceded by James Jackson	Treasurer and Receiver-General of Massachusetts; 1925 – 1928	Succeeded by John W. Haigis
Preceded by Wesley E. Monk	Member of the Massachusetts State Senate; Norfolk and Suffolk District; 1923 – 1924	Succeeded by Erland F. Fish
Party political offices
Preceded by James Jackson	Republican nominee for Treasurer and Receiver-General of Massachusetts; 1924, 1926	Succeeded by John W. Haigis
Preceded by Frank G. Allen	Republican nominee for Lieutenant Governor of Massachusetts; 1928, 1930	Succeeded by Gaspar G. Bacon
Preceded by Frank G. Allen	Republican nominee for Governor of Massachusetts; 1932	Succeeded by Gaspar G. Bacon
