= John J. Ballam =

American politician (1882–1954)

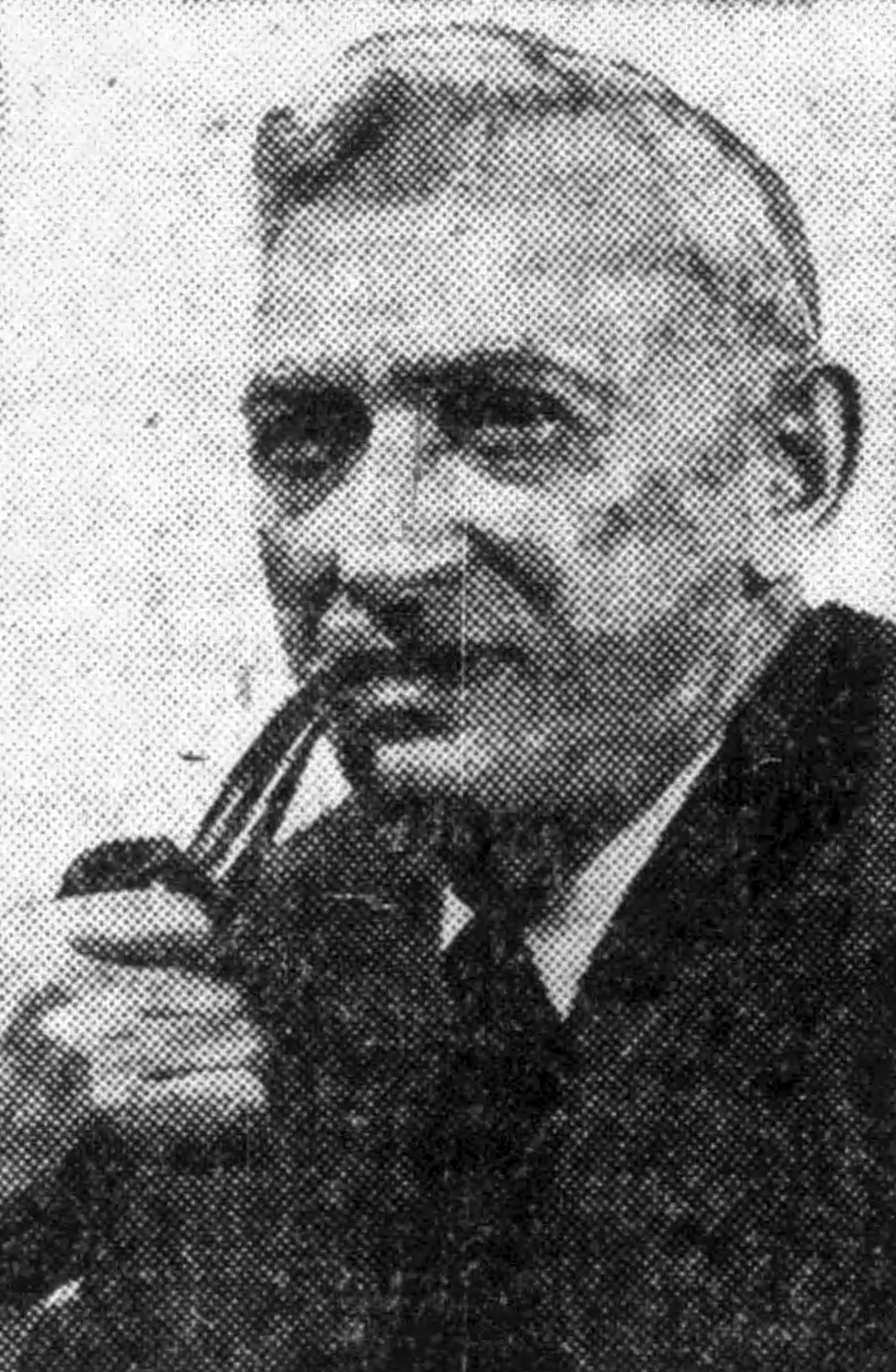
Ballam c. 1939

John J. Ballam (June 9, 1882 – September 26, 1954) was an English-born American Marxist political activist and trade union organizer. He is best remembered as a founding member and one of the pioneer leaders of the Communist Party of America and as a leader of the Trade Union Unity League in the textile industry during the 1930s.

== Biography ==
=== Early years ===
John J. Ballam was born June 9, 1882, in London, England. His family relocated to the United States soon after.

=== Political career ===
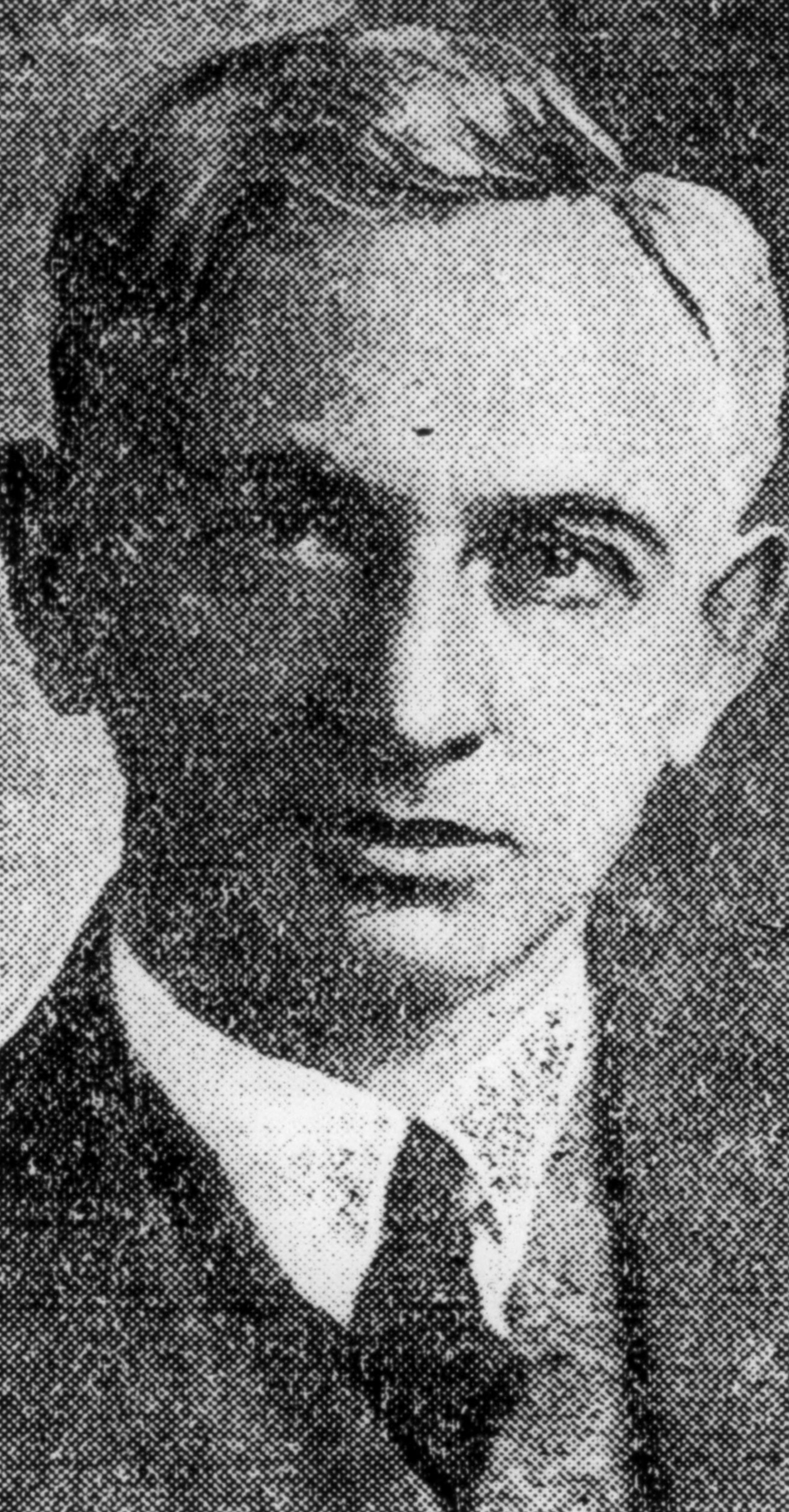
Ballam c. 1928

Ballam was a member of the Socialist Labor Party of America from 1898 to 1902.

In 1905, Ballam joined the fledgling Industrial Workers of the World, remaining a member of that organization through 1912.

In 1912, Ballam joined the Socialist Party of America (SPA). He remained a member of the Socialist Party through the 1919 split of the organization.

On June 10, 1918, Ballam was sentenced in Boston to 1 year in jail under the Espionage Act for a speech he delivered against American participation in the first World War. Ballam served time at the Plymouth County Jail until his release on about April 1, 1919.

In 1919, Ballam was a member of the Left Wing National Council, the New York-based group which was the embryo responsible for establishing the Communist Party of America (CPA) that same summer.

Ballam was a delegate to the founding convention of the CPA, held in Chicago the first week of September 1919. He was elected vice chairman by the convention but resigned in protest after just one day in response to internecine factional fighting that dominated the proceedings.

Following the conclusion of the founding convention of the CPA, Ballam edited the biweekly newspaper The New England Worker, published by the new organization.

Ballam was arrested by the United States Department of Justice in New Orleans, Louisiana, on December 2, 1919. He was returned to Massachusetts to face charges of having violated the Massachusetts Anti-Anarchy Act, which he did in January 1920.

Ballam was a member of the first Central Executive Committee of the CPA, elected in 1919. He remained in this position through 1921. District Organizer for an area including the cities of Cleveland and Pittsburgh for that group from April 1920 onwards.

During the first months of American communism, Ballam was regarded as a hardline opponent of unity of the CPA with the rival Communist Labor Party of America or its successor, the United Communist Party of America. Following unification of the CPA with this group, Ballam emerged as the leading English-speaking figure of a dissident left opposition group which split from the CPA late in 1921 over the issue of the forced participation of ostensibly underground party members in a "legal political party." Ballam was chosen to make the trip to Moscow on behalf of his comrades in an attempt to gain recognition for the underground Communist Party dissidents and their "legal" wing, the United Toilers, as the Communist International's official representatives in America.

Early in 1922, the Comintern ruled against the Central Caucus's parallel "Communist Party of America," ordering its members to reunite with the regular party organization and to turn over all of its "records, addresses, connections, and properties" to the main organization within 60 days.

Ballam agreed to this demand of the Comintern and returned to the regular CPA, which elected him a delegate to the party's ill-fated 1922 Bridgman Convention, held in August. Although he escaped arrest at the time of the raid, Ballam was among 9 of those who surrendered to authorities on March 10, 1923. He was released on a $1,000 bond but was never brought to trial on charges of having violated the Michigan anti-syndicalist law through his participation in the gathering.

In August 1923, Ballam was chosen as the campaign manager for the Workers Party of America's (successor to the underground CPA) effort to raise $100,000 to establish a daily newspaper in America.

During the bitter factional warfare of the 1920s, Ballam was a consistent supporter of the Communist Party faction headed by John Pepper, C.E. Ruthenberg, and Jay Lovestone.

Ballam worked as the Workers Party of America's district organizer for Buffalo and upstate New York in 1924.

=== Political campaigns ===
Ballam was the candidate of the Workers Party for Governor of Massachusetts in 1924. He ran for United States Senator from Massachusetts in 1926 and again in 1928.

In 1931 Ballam ran for Governor of New Jersey as the candidate of the Communist Party USA. The next year he ran for Governor of Massachusetts, heading the party's ticket in that state.

Ballam's final run for political office came in 1940, when he ran for United States Congress in the 16th Congressional District of New York.

=== Union activities ===
In 1922, Ballam was named the New England organizer for the Textile Workers' Union of the Trade Union Educational League.

Ballam was involved as a union leader in the 1926 Passaic Textile Strike. He appeared as himself in the documentary film on the strike produced by the Workers (Communist) Party of America to publicize the plight of the strikers.

Ballam was named the National Organizer of the National Textile Workers Union, part of the Communist Party-sponsored Trade Union Unity League in 1933. In this capacity he was active in helping direct the 1933 strike of workers in the silk industry, a stoppage which involved as many as 65,000 workers in New Jersey and elsewhere in the east.

=== Death and legacy ===
John J. Ballam died in 1954.

== Works ==
- "Report of the Secretary of the Central Caucus to the National Conference of the Communist Party of America, December 25, 1921." Corvallis, OR: 1000 Flowers Publishing, 2007.
- "Testimony to the Executive Committee of the Communist International, March 18, 1922." Corvallis, OR: 1000 Flowers Publishing, 2007.
- "Uphold Your Revolutionary Traditions!" Daily Worker [Chicago], vol. 3, no. 59 (March 22, 1926), pg. 4.
- Soviet "Dumping" and "Forced Labor." New York: Friends of Soviet Russia, n.d. [c. 1929].
- 70,000 Silk Workers Strike for Bread and Unity. New York: Labor Unity Publications, 1934.
