= Joseph B. Ely =

American politician (1881-1956)

Joseph Ely
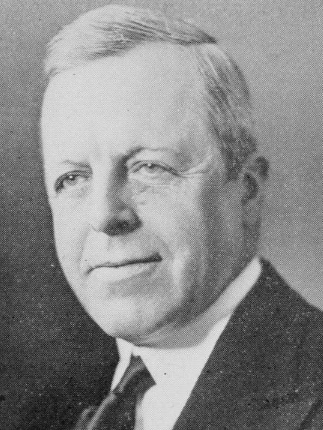
- circa 1930–34

52nd Governor of Massachusetts
- In office January 8, 1931 – January 3, 1935
- Lieutenant: William S. Youngman; Gaspar G. Bacon
- Preceded by: Frank G. Allen
- Succeeded by: James Michael Curley

Personal details
- Born: February 22, 1881 Westfield, Massachusetts, U.S.
- Died: June 13, 1956 (aged 75) Westfield, Massachusetts, U.S.
- Party: Democratic

Joseph Buell Ely (February 22, 1881 – June 13, 1956) was an American lawyer and Democratic politician from Massachusetts. As a conservative Democrat, Ely was active in party politics from the late 1910s, helping to build, in conjunction with David I. Walsh, the Democratic coalition that would gain an enduring political ascendancy in the state. From 1931 to 1935, he served as the 52nd governor of Massachusetts. He was opposed to the federal expansion of the New Deal, and was a prominent intra-party voice in opposition to the policies of Franklin Delano Roosevelt. In 1944 he made a brief unsuccessful bid for the Democratic presidential nomination.

== Early years ==
Joseph Buell Ely was born in Westfield, Massachusetts, to Henry Wilson Ely and Sarah Naomi Buell Ely. His grandfather, Joseph Miner Ely, was one of the founders of Westfield's important whip industry, and his father, a lawyer, was active in Democratic party circles in heavily Republican western Massachusetts. Ely attended local schools, and then Williams College, where he helped organize student support for William Jennings Bryan in the 1900 presidential election. He graduated from Williams in 1902, and then received a law degree from Harvard Law School in 1905. He returned to Westfield, where he joined his father's law firm. In 1906 he married Harriet Zelda Dyson, a schoolteacher; they had one son.

Governor David I. Walsh appointed Ely to serve as District Attorney for the Western District of Massachusetts in 1915; he was elected in his own right to this position the next year, serving until 1920.

== Political career ==
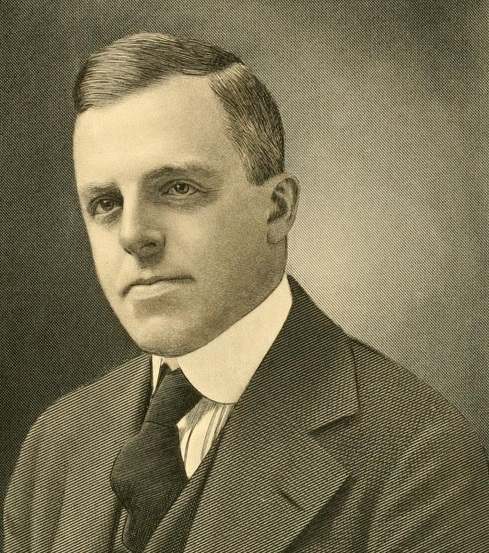
Ely in the 1920s

Ely was active in the state Democratic Party, and was in 1922 put forward as a candidate for Governor of Massachusetts; he placed a distant third in the primary, which was won by John "Honey Fitz" Fitzgerald. In 1924 he was delegate to the national Democratic convention, where he supported the Progressive Al Smith. In 1926 he was tapped by the party leadership as a candidate for lieutenant governor, but lost the primary in an unusual quirk. His primary opponent, Harry Dooley, had been asked to withdraw so that the party could present an ethnically diverse and geographically balanced ticket, but his name remained on the ballot, and he ended up winning the nomination because of the support of Irish Americans. Dooley offered to surrender the nomination in favor of Ely, but the latter refused, believing the means to be an embarrassment. Ely again supported Smith at the 1928 Democratic National Convention.

In 1930, Ely again stood for the Democratic nomination for governor. He was opposed in this by the aging Honey Fitz, who was little more than a proxy candidate for former Boston mayor James Michael Curley. Curley loudly accused the Yankee Protestant Ely of being anti-Irish, which Ely countered by pointing out Curley's own public criticisms of Irish-American politicians in his campaigns. Al Smith campaigned for Ely, who won the nomination by a narrow margin.

Ely was opposed in the general election by incumbent Governor Frank G. Allen. The Republicans were harmed politically by the 1929 Stock Market Crash and the start of the Great Depression, and were further divided over the issue of Prohibition. Ely ran on a platform emphasizing debt-financed public works projects.

After Ely took office, he began a series of public works projects to relieve unemployment. These were funded by long-term debts and were approved by the Republican-controlled legislature. Unlike other states, Massachusetts refused federal aid during Ely's administration. Highway construction in Massachusetts was accelerated by this work, which was also supported by the imposition of a gasoline tax.

Other policies advocated by Ely included substantial reductions in state salaries during the depression, which was met with overwhelming legislative resistance. In concert with the City of Boston, Ely established a permanent Boston Police Academy to increase the training of public safety officers.

Curley and Ely would again cross swords in the 1932 presidential election, when Curley supported Franklin Delano Roosevelt and Ely supported Smith. Ely and Walsh were successful in getting Curley and other Roosevelt supporters excluded from the state's delegation to the 1932 Democratic National Convention, although Curley attended the convention anyway as a delegate representing Puerto Rico. Ely gave the convention speech formally nominating Smith, but shifted to giving lukewarm support to Roosevelt after the latter won the party's nomination. He was afterward snubbed by Roosevelt on federal appointment matters because of his support for Smith. Ely comfortably won reelection in 1932, defeating Lieutenant Governor William S. Youngman. Since the debt-funded works projects were not having a significant impact economically, Ely abandoned the idea in his second term, returning to "pay-as-you-go" financing for such projects. The divisive and at times acrimonious intra-party strife between Curley and the Ely-Walsh wing of the Democratic Party contributed to the state's difficulties in securing federal relief funds.

== Later years ==
Ely declined to run for reelection in 1934 and returned to law. He became a senior partner in the firm of Ely, Bradford, Thompson and Brown with future governor Robert F. Bradford and George E. Thompson. He remained active in state and national Democratic politics, continuing to oppose Roosevelt's New Deal policies, which he considered "dangerously socialistic". As legal representative to Boston real estate interests, he opposed the city's acquisition of land for New Deal projects, tieing up the Old Harbor Housing Project in litigation for over two years. In 1935, he joined the American Liberty League, and supported Republican Alf Landon in the 1936 presidential election. He ran for the Democratic presidential nomination in 1944, ending the bid after being badly defeated in the Massachusetts primary.

Ely died at the age of 75 on June 13, 1956 at his home in Westfield. He is buried at Westfield's Pine Hill Cemetery.

Joseph Ely is well remembered in his hometown, where Westfield State University's Governor Joseph B. Ely Library is named in his honor.

== Sources ==
- Allison, Robert; Bulger, William (2009). James Michael Curley. Beverly, MA: Commonwealth Editions. ISBN 9781933212975. OCLC 299281797.
- Beatty, Jack (1992). The rascal king: the life and times of James Michael Curley, 1874-1958. Reading, MA: Addison-Wesley. ISBN 9780201175998. OCLC 25508742.
- Gentile, Richard H (1999). "Ely, Joseph B". Dictionary of American National Biography. Vol. 7. New York: Oxford University Press. pp. 474–475. ISBN 9780195206357. OCLC 39182280.
- Huthmacher, J. Joseph (1959). Massachusetts People and Politics, 1919-1933. Cambridge, MA: Belknap Press. OCLC 460668046.
- Trout, Charles H (1977). Boston: The Great Depression and the New Deal. New York: Oxford University Press. ISBN 9780195021905. OCLC 185503039.

Party political offices
Preceded by Charles H. Cole	Democratic nominee for Governor of Massachusetts; 1930, 1932	Succeeded by James Michael Curley
Political offices
Preceded by Frank G. Allen	Governor of Massachusetts; 1931–1935	Succeeded by James M. Curley
