= Frank G. Allen =

American politician and businessman (1874-1950)

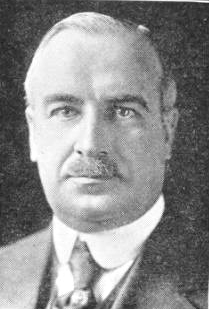
- Allen c. 1921

51st Governor of Massachusetts
- In office January 3, 1929 – January 8, 1931
- Lieutenant: William S. Youngman
- Preceded by: Alvan T. Fuller
- Succeeded by: Joseph B. Ely

49th lieutenant governor of Massachusetts
- In office January 8, 1925 – January 3, 1929
- Governor: Alvan T. Fuller
- Preceded by: Alvan T. Fuller
- Succeeded by: William S. Youngman

President of the Massachusetts Senate
- In office 1921–1924
- Preceded by: Edwin T. McKnight
- Succeeded by: Wellington Wells

Member of the Massachusetts Senate from the Norfolk district
- In office 1920–1924

Member of the Massachusetts House of Representatives from the 8th Norfolk district
- In office January 1918 – January 1920

Chairman of the Norwood Board of Selectmen
- In office 1914–1919

Chairman of the Norwood Board of Assessors
- In office 1909–1913

Personal details
- Born: Frank Gilman Allen; October 6, 1874 Lynn, Massachusetts, U.S.
- Died: October 9, 1950 (aged 76) Norwood, Massachusetts, U.S.
- Party: Republican
- Profession: Leather and Wool merchant

Frank Gilman Allen (October 6, 1874 – October 9, 1950) was an American businessman and politician from Massachusetts. He was president of a successful leathergoods business in Norwood, Massachusetts, and active in local and state politics. A Republican, he served two terms as the 49th lieutenant governor, and then one as the 51st governor of Massachusetts. He was a major proponent of development in Norwood, donating land and funds for a number of civic improvements.

== Early years ==
Allen was born in Lynn, Massachusetts, on October 6, 1874, the son of Abbie Louise (Gilman) and Frank Mitchell Allen. He was educated in local schools. Although he won admission to Harvard University, he lacked the funds to attend, and instead began working Lynn's shoe industry. He later moved to Norwood, where he worked in the tannery of Francis O. Winslow. Allen rose to become president of the Winslow Brothers & Smith Company, a position he held from 1912 to 1929, and married Winslow's daughter Clara in 1897. Allen was for many years a business partner of George Willett, who had married another of Winslow's daughters. The two men were major influences in the modernization of Norwood's civic infrastructure, spearheading a number of projects, from the construction of schools to a new hospital.

Allen maintained a summer residence on Marblehead Neck from 1923 until his death. Clara Winslow Allen, with whom Allen had a daughter, died in 1924, and he remarried in 1927, to Eleanor Hamilton Wallace.

== Political career ==
Allen entered public service as a member of the Norwood Board of Assessors from 1910 to 1915 and as a Norwood town selectman from 1915 to 1922. During that period, he also served in the Massachusetts House of Representatives from 1918 to 1919, and in the Massachusetts Senate from 1921 to 1924. In 1924, he was elected Lieutenant Governor of Massachusetts, having defeated the Democratic ticket of James Michael Curley and running mate James Henry Brennan with fellow Republican governor Alvan T. Fuller. Fuller and Allen served two terms, after which Allen succeeded Fuller as governor, and served until 1931.

During the administration of Governor Allen, he established the state's Industrial Commission. He expanded facilities to care for the sick and the indigent, and in an unusual move for the times, appointed two women to judgeships in Massachusetts. He also signed the bill granting the Eastern Nazarene College the power to grant degrees in Massachusetts on March 12, 1930, after the school defended its petition before the General Court. In 1930, Governor Allen was defeated for re-election by Democrat Joseph B. Ely, and returned to the Winslow Brothers & Smith Company, where he served as chairman of the board.

== Business and Norwood civic affairs ==
Allen's post-governorship leadership of Winslow Brothers & Smith was marked by declines in business, caused in part by the Great Depression. There was also conflict with workers that included three strikes, some of which included violent confrontations between strikers and police. Allen retired as board chairman in December 1949, and Winslow Brothers & Smith left Norwood in 1952.

Allen and his brother-in-law George Willett were leaders in efforts to modernize Norwood's civic affairs and infrastructure in the 1920s and 1930s. Projects shepherded by them included construction of schools, as well as the local hospital, projects for which they gave both land and funding. The pair had a good relationship until 1930, when Willett, who had suffered financial reverses and descended into paranoia, accused Allen of leading a conspiracy to frustrate a major residential development project in the town. Due to the highly public way the charge was made, Allen, then governor, was forced to make a public denial of Willett's charges. (Willett was declared mentally incompetent in 1952.)

Allen died in 1950 at his Boston home, and is buried in Norwood's Highland Cemetery. He was survived by his second wife, Eleanor Wallace Allen, a son, and two daughters.

== See also ==
- 1918 Massachusetts legislature
- 1919 Massachusetts legislature
- 1920 Massachusetts legislature
- 1921–1922 Massachusetts legislature
- 1923–1924 Massachusetts legislature

== Sources ==
- Cameron, James R. (1968). Eastern Nazarene College—The First Fifty Years, 1900-1950. Kansas City: Nazarene Publishing House.
- Fanning, Patricia J (2002). Norwood: A History. Charleston, SC: Arcadia Publishing. ISBN 9781439630556. OCLC 51572920.

Party political offices
| Preceded by Alvan T. Fuller | Republican nominee for Lieutenant Governor of Massachusetts; 1924, 1926 | Succeeded by William S. Youngman |
| Preceded by Alvan T. Fuller | Republican nominee for Governor of Massachusetts; 1928, 1930 | Succeeded by William S. Youngman |
Political offices
| Preceded by Alvan T. Fuller | Lieutenant Governor of Massachusetts; 1925–1929 | Succeeded by William S. Youngman |
| Preceded by Alvan T. Fuller | Governor of Massachusetts; 1929–1931 | Succeeded by Joseph B. Ely |
