= Alfred Baker Lewis =

American lawyer and activist (1897–1980)

Alfred Baker Lewis (1897 – 1980) was an American lawyer, union organizer, socialist, and civil rights activist. He was served on the board of the National Association for the Advancement of Colored People from 1939 until his death and as its treasurer from 1958 to 1972. He was also secretary of the Socialist Party of Massachusetts from 1924 to 1940. While involved with the Socialist Party, Lewis ran for United States Senate in 1926 and 1928 and for Governor of Massachusetts in 1930, 1932, 1934 and 1936.

He died in October 1980, an apparent suicide, when he was hit by a train at Old Greenwich station in Greenwich, Connecticut.
