= Norman Hansen =

Saugus, Massachusetts Town manager
- In office 1987–1992
- Preceded by: Paul Rabchenuk
- Succeeded by: Edward J. Collins, Jr.

Saugus, Massachusetts temporary town manager
- In office 1981–1981
- Preceded by: Robert Cornetta
- Succeeded by: Paul Rabchenuk
- In office 1977–1978
- Preceded by: George O. Gregson
- Succeeded by: Thomas E. Duff
- In office 1973–1974
- Preceded by: Francis Moorehouse
- Succeeded by: Robert C. Hagopian

Chairman of the Saugus, Massachusetts Board of Selectmen
- In office 1965–1967
- Preceded by: Vernon W. Evans
- Succeeded by: Maurice Cunningham

Saugus town moderator
- In office 1965–1965
- Preceded by: William Robinson
- Succeeded by: Richard Barry

Personal details
- Born: July 8, 1924 Berlin, New Hampshire
- Died: October 27, 2014 (aged 90) Newburyport, Massachusetts
- Occupation: Engineer; Town accountant Town manager

Norman B. Hansen (July 8, 1924 – October 27, 2014) was an American politician and government official who held various positions in Saugus, Massachusetts. He served as town manager from 1987 to 1992 and on four occasions served as temporary Town Manager.

== Early life and political career ==
Hansen was born and raised in Berlin, New Hampshire. During World War II he served as a member of the United States Marine Corps. In 1946 Hansen moved to Saugus. He began his political career as a town meeting member. Hansen also served as a member of the town's Finance Committee. In 1964 he was an unsuccessful candidate for the board of selectmen. In 1965 he was named town moderator. In 1967, he was hired as a junior engineering aid in the Essex County engineer's office.

== Board of selectmen ==
That same year he was elected to the board of selectmen and named its chairman. During his first year on the board, the selectmen voted 4 to 0 to suspend and fire Town Manager John O. Stinson due to the town's "sky-rocketing tax rate" and Stinson's "cool indifference" to the board of selectmen. Stanley Day, the head of a local engineering firm, was selected by the board to serve as temporary town manager. On July 31, the board chose Paul H. Boucher over Day in a 3 to 2 vote for the permanent job, with Hansen voting for Boucher.

Hansen was reelected in 1967. On February 20, 1968, the board of selectmen voted unanimously not to renew Boucher's contract. To replace him, the board selected Clarence Wilkinson over former Keene, New Hampshire City Manager Frank A. Saia by 3 to 2 vote, with Hansen voting for Saia. He was reelected again in 1969, but chose not run for reelection in 1971 so he could accept the position of town accountant.

== Town accountant ==
From 1971 to 1987, Hansen served as Saugus' town accountant. While in this position, Hansen also served as temporary town manager from 1973 to 1974, 1977 to 1978, in 1981, and in 1987.

== Town manager ==
From 1987 to 1990, Hansen served as town manager of Saugus. During his tenure, Hansen attempted to eliminate the town's debt, he suspended two police officers for "engaging in unlawful sexual activity while on duty", the town put in new water and sewer lines, and town employees elected to move to a four-day workweek instead of facing layoffs.

After Hansen left office he returned to his former position of town accountant.

== Personal life and death ==
Hansen was married for 62 years to Evelyn N. (Pratt) Hansen, the daughter of C. F. Nelson Pratt. The couple had five children. Evelyn Hansen died on May 6, 2009.

Hansen died on October 27, 2014, in Newburyport, Massachusetts.
