= Vernon W. Evans =

American politician

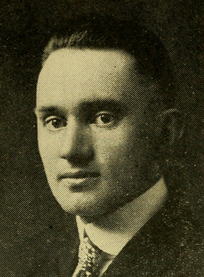
- Vernon Wynne Evans Massachusetts House of Representatives 1923

Member of the Massachusetts House of Representatives from the 13th Essex District
- In office 1920–1924
- Preceded by: ^{1}
- Succeeded by: ^{2}

Saugus, Massachusetts Superintendent of Public Schools
- In office 1933–1951
- Preceded by: Jesse Lambert
- Succeeded by: Jesse J. Morgan

Chairman of the Saugus, Massachusetts Board of Selectmen
- In office 1925–1925
- Preceded by: Walter Sprague
- Succeeded by: C. F. Nelson Pratt
- In office 1955–1957
- Preceded by: John J. Bucchiere
- Succeeded by: David R. Nagle
- In office 1959–1965
- Preceded by: David R. Nagle
- Succeeded by: Norman Hansen

Personal details
- Born: January 5, 1895 Saugus, Massachusetts
- Died: 1975 (aged 79–80)
- Party: Republican
- Education: Boston University
- Occupation: Journalist; Politician; Educator; School Superintendent

Vernon Wynne Evans (January 5, 1895 – 1975) was an American politician and educator from Saugus, Massachusetts who served as a member of the Massachusetts House of Representatives, Superintendent of the Saugus Public Schools, and as a member of the Saugus Board of Selectmen.

== Early life ==
Evans was born on January 5, 1895, in Saugus. He attended Boston University and worked as a journalist before entering politics. He served as a field artillery officer in France during World War I.

== Massachusetts House of Representatives ==
From 1920 to 1924, Evans represented the 13th Essex District in the Massachusetts House of Representatives. First elected at the age of 21, he was the youngest person ever elected to the Massachusetts General Court. In 1924, he was a candidate for State Senate in the Seventh Middlesex District, but lost in the Republican primary to Charles P. Howard.

In 1925, he was elected to the Saugus Board of Selectmen. During his tenure on the board, Evans and fellow selectman C. F. Nelson Pratt paid out of pocket for repairs to a bridge frequently used by Saugus residents that the town could not pay to fix because it was on private property. He also led an effort to make the Board of Selectmen an unpaid board.

== Saugus public schools ==
=== Principal ===
From 1922 to 1930, Evans was submaster of Saugus High School. On August 29, 1930, he was promoted to principal following the departure of Robert R. Webber. As principal, Evans pushed for the overcrowded High School to be expanded.

=== Superintendent ===
On April 1, 1933, Evans was appointed School Superintendent of Saugus Public Schools. He filled a vacancy caused the death of Jesse W. Lambert.

In October 1935, Evans expelled six Jehovah's Witness students who refused to salute the flag.

In 1937, the Saugus Public School System became embroiled in a controversy after English teacher and dramatic coach Isabelle Hallin was not reappointed by the school committee amid rumors that she had served cocktails to students during a drama club rehearsal at her home. The three members of the School Committee who voted against keeping Hallin insisted that their actions were based on reports from Evans on her abilities as a teacher and not the unproven rumors. Evans publicly recommend giving her tenure, but the school committee refuse to reinstate her. Evans would testify in Hallin's slander case against Minnie McDuffee that he had investigated the rumors surrounding Hallin and was unable to substantiate them.

In 1938, he traveled to Amherst, New Hampshire and helped convince Saugus High School graduate and college football star Harrington Gates to leave The Holy Ghost and Us Society, a cult led by Frank Sandford, and return to Dartmouth College.

In 1940, he expelled two more Jehovah's Witnesses for refusing to salute the flag.

Evans retired from the Saugus School System on August 31, 1951.

== Board of Selectmen ==
In 1955, Evans was elected to the Saugus Board of Selectmen.

In 1958, the Board selected John B. Kennedy to serve as Town Manager. Evans, who voted for temporary Town Manager Arthur Gustafson instead of Kennedy, chose not to swear him in and Town Clerk Ruth E. Stevens administered the oath instead.

In 1961, the Board voted to ban dancing and other entertainment on New Year's Eve and New Year's Day.

On February 20, 1962, the Board of Selectmen voted 3 to 2 to appoint John O. Stinson Town Manager with Evans voting for Clarence Wilkinson. Evans would later become a supporter of Stinson and was the only Selectmen who opposed his firing in 1967, although he was unable to attend the meeting due to illness. Evans would vote to appoint temporary manager Stanley Day to permanently succeed Stinson, however Paul H. Boucher was chosen by a 3 to 2 vote. The Board would unanimously vote to fire Boucher six months later and Clarence Wilkinson was appointed to succeed him on a 3 to 2 vote, with Evans once again supporting him.

== Personal life ==
Evans was married to Gladys Wyatt of Prince Edward Island. The couple had one son, Vernon W. Evans, Jr., who would serve as a Florida Circuit Court judge. The two divorced and Evans, Jr. grew up with his mother's family.

On September 16, 1931, Evans married his second wife, Annie M. Emrick, at the Center Congregational Church in Lynn, Massachusetts.

== See also ==
- 1920 Massachusetts legislature
- 1921–1922 Massachusetts legislature
- 1923–1924 Massachusetts legislature

== Notes ==
1. The 13th Essex District sent three representatives to the Massachusetts House of Representatives during Evans' tenure. In 1920, Evans and Tony Garofano succeeded Ernest W. Allen and Thomas W. Baxter. The third member, Daniel J. Hayden, was reelected.
2. In 1925, Harriet Russell Hart and Fred A. Hutchinson succeeded Evans and Ralph H. Burckes. The third member, Tony Garofano, was reelected.
