= C. F. Nelson Pratt =

American politician (1891–1968)

Charles Forest Nelson Pratt
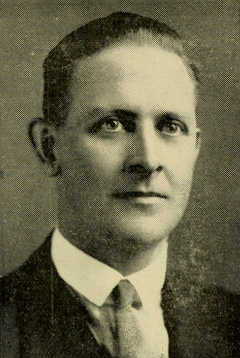
- Charles Forest Nelson Pratt Massachusetts House of Representatives 1929

Member of the Massachusetts House of Representatives from the 10th Essex district
- In office 1927–1935
- Preceded by: Harriet Russell Hart
- Succeeded by: William Landergan

Personal details
- Born: February 4, 1891 Saugus, Massachusetts
- Died: November 5, 1968 (aged 77) Saugus General Hospital; Saugus, Massachusetts
- Party: Republican
- Education: Saugus High School; Northeastern University; Boston University School of Law
- Occupation: Shoe factory foreman Politician

Charles Forest Nelson Pratt (February 4, 1891 – November 5, 1968) was a Republican politician from Saugus, Massachusetts.

== Early life ==
He was born on February 4, 1891, in Saugus, Massachusetts. A graduate of Saugus High School, Northeastern University, and Boston University School of Law, During World War I he was a conscientious objector and was working at the A. E. Little shoe company.

== Town offices ==
=== School Committee ===
Pratt served on the Saugus School Board from 1916 to 1919.

=== Board of Selectmen ===
In 1919, Pratt was elected to the Board of Selectmen where he would later serve as chairman. In 1925, he made headlines for his plan to arm 100 hand-picked citizens in order to deter bandits from operating in Saugus. Pratt dropped his proposal for a "vigilance committee" at the next meeting.

On August 4, 1935, Pratt was 15 minutes late to a Selectmen's meeting. When he arrived, he found that the other two members had voted to remove him as chairman of the board and replace him with John J. Mullen. That October, Pratt accused Mullen of coercing Works Progress Administration workers by threatening to have them fired if they did not vote for President Franklin D. Roosevelt and telling them they were expected to attend a Democratic Party rally at Saugus Town Hall. Mullen later accused Pratt of assaulting him, but the charges were not pressed due to lack of evidence. Mullen issued himself a permit for a .38-caliber pistol for protection against Pratt. After it was learned that Mullen had issued himself a gun permit, a group of citizens stoned his home. Both Pratt and Mullen were defeated in the 1937 election.

=== Town Meeting ===
Pratt was the leading opponent of the Plan E form of government in Saugus. Plan E would create the office of Town Manager, expand the Board of Selectmen from three members to five, change the electoral system for town elections to Single transferable vote, and change a number of elected positions to appointed positions. The Plan E form of government was adopted following a June 2, 1947, referendum in which the proposed form of government was supported 3,252 votes to 816.

Pratt was also a leading opponent of rezoning part of the old Town Farm property so a shopping mall (the New England Shopping Center) could be built there. Town Meeting approved the rezoning 42 to 1.

On April 11, 1955, Town Moderator Paul A. Haley had Police Chief Roland E. Mansfield eject Pratt from a town meeting and lock him in the Town Clerk's office until the meeting ended. Haley had Pratt removed after Haley determined that Pratt, who was not a town meeting member, was out of order for suggesting a town meeting member support an article. Pratt eventually agreed to sit down, but after a few seconds demanded to be heard on a point of parliamentary procedure and was then ejected.

Pratt was elected to Town Meeting in the next election and on December 13, 1955, he was elected Town Moderator with 23 votes to William H. Robinson's 19.

On April 25, 1960, Pratt attempted to eject Augustine Gannon following a controversial vote. However, before a police officer could reach Gannon, all 35 present town meeting members walked out.

== General Court ==
In 1926, Pratt was elected to the Massachusetts House of Representatives. He defeated Harriet Russell Hart, the third woman ever elected to the Massachusetts General Court.

Pratt served from 1927 to 1935. Shortly after taking office he filed a bill to abolish capital punishment. He would file a similar bill at the beginning of each session he served.

Despite being a Republican, he supported president Franklin D. Roosevelt's New Deal and represented the National Shoe Workers during their 1933 strike. He was a member of the Banks and Banking and Counties commissions.

During Pratt's tenure in the Massachusetts House, each district was represented by the top three vote-getters in the general election. His co-representatives were Tony Garofano (1927–35), Fred A. Hutchinson (1927–33), James E. McElroy (1933–35).

=== Assault conviction ===
In 1928, Pratt was charged with attempted felonious assault. Catherine Sullivan, a friend and former coworker of Pratt's, testified that she met him on May 20, 1928, at the State House after he offered her a chance to work there. After visiting the Civil Service Commission and Income Tax Department, Pratt was unable to attain Sullivan a job and he offered to drive her home. During the trip, Sullivan noticed that she and Pratt were on the wrong road. Pratt later stopped the car in a wooded area in Middleton, Massachusetts, where he dragged her into the back seat and attempt to assault her. She escaped and he pursued her. He caught her and threw her to the ground, but she escaped again and ran to a house in the woods, where the woman who resided there took her in.

Pratt testified that it was Sullivan's idea to have him drive her home and her idea to stop in the woods. When they stopped, Sullivan got in the back seat and he followed. Pratt admitted to mutual petting, but when she put her arm around his shoulder, he then ceased and never laid a hand on her. He also told the court that he had heard a couple days before the incident that his political enemies were "out to get him" and would trap him by planting a woman in his car.

Pratt was found guilty of simple assault on October 25, 1928. On October 31, a judge fined him $100, but opted not to impose a prison sentence.

== County Commission ==
Pratt was an Essex County Commissioner from 1939 to 1943 and again from 1944 until his death in 1968. He would be the last Republican to serve as an Essex County Commissioner until Everett C. Hudson was elected in 1984.

During his first year on the commission, Pratt fought with fellow commissioners Frederick Butler and James D. Bentley. He felt that Butler kept all of the patronage and made all of the major appointments himself "aided and abetted by his own political appointee, Bentley". In the 1940 election, Pratt supported Butler's opponent for the Republican nomination, Tom Longworth. Butler was reelected, but Bentley lost to J. Fred Manning in the general election. After Manning took office, he voted to make Pratt chairman and sided with him on a number of issues, including making Commission meetings public.

Pratt lost to Bentley in 1942 after a recount. He was elected in 1944 and was seated early after Commissioners Manning and Arthur Thompson appointed fellow Commissioner Bentley to the post of Essex County treasurer. Thompson, whose term was expiring, was then chosen to succeed Bentley on the Commission and Pratt was appointed to Thompson's seat.

In his final years on the commission, the body was criticized for making nepotistic appointments. Pratt had as many has seven family members employed by the county at one time. To address this, Pratt filed a bill with the state legislature that would have extended civil service to county employees. The legislature turned it down.

== Congressional campaigns ==
Pratt ran four times for Massachusetts's 7th congressional district seat. He lost the general election in 1934 and 1936, the nomination in 1937 to fill a vacancy in the seat, and a special election to fill a later vacancy in the seat in 1941. He also lost the nomination for the 6th congressional district seat to William H. Bates in 1950.

== Personal life ==
Pratt was a member of the Freemasons and the Odd Fellows.

Pratt had four daughters, one of whom was married to Saugus politician and government official Norman Hansen.

== Death ==
Pratt was a candidate for reelection to the Essex County Commission in 1968. On Election Day, Pratt felt sick and returned home early from campaigning. He was later rushed to Saugus General Hospital, where he was pronounced dead. He lost his final election by 2,897 votes.

== Legacy ==
On June 16, 1969, the intersection of the Lynn Fells Parkway and Route 1 was dedicated the C. F. Nelson Pratt intersection in his memory. The intersection has since been replaced by an overpass also dedicated to Pratt.

On October 9, 1971, a bronze plaque in Saugus Center was erected in memory of Pratt.

== See also ==
- 1927–1928 Massachusetts legislature
- 1929–1930 Massachusetts legislature
- 1931–1932 Massachusetts legislature
- 1933–1934 Massachusetts legislature
