= Senator McDermott =

Senator McDermott may refer to:

- Allan L. McDermott (1854–1908), New Jersey State Senate
- Frank X. McDermott (1924–2011), New Jersey State Senate
- Frederick T. McDermott (1906–2003), Massachusetts State Senate
- Jim McDermott (1936–2026), Washington State Senate
- Joe McDermott (politician) (born 1967), Washington State Senate
- Joseph H. McDermott (1871–1930), West Virginia State Senate
