= Harriet Russell Hart =

American politician (1878-1958)

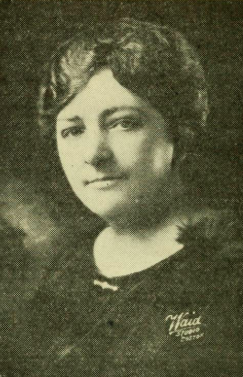

Member of the Massachusetts House of Representatives from the 13th Essex district
- In office 1925–1926
- Preceded by: ^{1}
- Succeeded by: C. F. Nelson Pratt

Personal details
- Born: February 1, 1878 Lynn, Massachusetts
- Died: October 15, 1958 (aged 80) Saugus, Massachusetts
- Party: Republican
- Spouse: Fred V. Hart

Harriet Russell Hart (1878-1958) was an American politician who served on the Lynn, Massachusetts School Committee and the Massachusetts House of Representatives. She was the third woman elected to the Massachusetts House of Representatives.

== Early life ==
Hart was born on February 1, 1878, in Lynn to Robinson Y. and Frances A. (Rowell) Russell. He grandfather, Joseph Mason Rowell, was a member of Lynn's first city council. She attended Lynn public schools and graduated from Lynn Classical High School. When her father moved to Saugus, Massachusetts, she went with him. At the age of 20 she married Fred V. Hart.

== Political career ==
In 1920, Hart was elected to the Lynn School Committee. In 1924 she was elected to the Massachusetts House of Representatives. She was the third woman elected to the Massachusetts House of Representatives, 13th Essex District's first female representative, and Lynn's first female representative. During her tenure in the House, Hart's priorities were child welfare, public institutions, and education. She was defeated for reelection by C. F. Nelson Pratt. Hart was a delegate to the 1928 Republican National Convention. In 1934 she was an unsuccessful candidate in the 11th Essex District.

== Personal life and death ==
Hart's husband was an executive with the United Shoe Machinery Corporation. They had three daughters and were members of the Methodist Episcopal Church.

Hart was involved with a number community organizations in Lynn and on the North Shore, including the North Shore Club, Woman's Republican Club, Presidents Club, and the local Red Cross chapter. She served as president of the Lynn Association for the Blind, the Women's Club of Lynn, and the Outlook Club of Lynn. Her hobbies included jelly making, music, and embroidery.

Hart died on October 15, 1958, at Saugus General Hospital. At the time of her death, Hart and her husband were residing in Marblehead, Massachusetts, where two of their daughters also lived.

== See also ==
- 1925–1926 Massachusetts legislature

== Notes ==
1. The 13th Essex District sent three representatives to the Massachusetts House of Representatives during Hart's tenure. In 1925, Hart and Fred A. Hutchinson succeeded Vernon W. Evans and Ralph H. Burckes. The third member, Tony Garofano, was reelected.
