= Samuel Zoll =

American politician

Samuel Edward Zoll
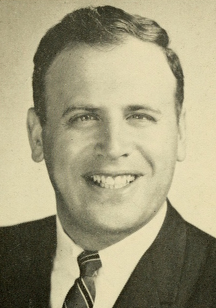

Presiding Justice of the Salem District Court
- In office 1974–2004^{1}
- Preceded by: Philip J. Durkin
- Succeeded by: Robert Cornetta

45th Mayor of Salem, Massachusetts
- In office 1970–1973
- Preceded by: Francis X. Collins
- Succeeded by: Jean A. Levesque

Member of the Massachusetts House of Representatives 6th Essex District
- In office 1965–1969

Member of the Salem, Massachusetts City Council
- In office 1958–1966

Personal details
- Born: June 20, 1934 Peabody, Massachusetts
- Died: April 26, 2011 (aged 76) Salem, Massachusetts
- Party: Democratic
- Education: Boston University, Suffolk University Law School
- Profession: Lawyer

Samuel Edward Zoll (June 20, 1934 – April 26, 2011) was an American lawyer, judge and politician. He began his career as a high school teacher then became a lawyer, politician, then a judge. Later in life he was named to be Chief Justice of the District Courts in Massachusetts.

== Early life and education ==
Zoll was born in Peabody, Massachusetts. His father was an immigrant from Lithuania, and his mother was a native of nearby Haverhill. Zoll was educated at Salem High School and attained a Bachelor of Science degree in Accounting and a Master of Arts degree, both from Boston University.

He attended the Suffolk University Law School receiving a Juris Doctor Degree (JD) degree in 1962.

== Career ==
Zoll was a United States Navy veteran who served in the Korean War. Zoll worked as a high school teacher at Danvers High School from 1958 to 1962. While teaching, he served on the Salem City Council (from 1958 until 1966, being President of the Council from 1959 to 1960). After graduating in law, Zoll worked as a lawyer. He was a State Representative of Salem from 1965 to 1969.

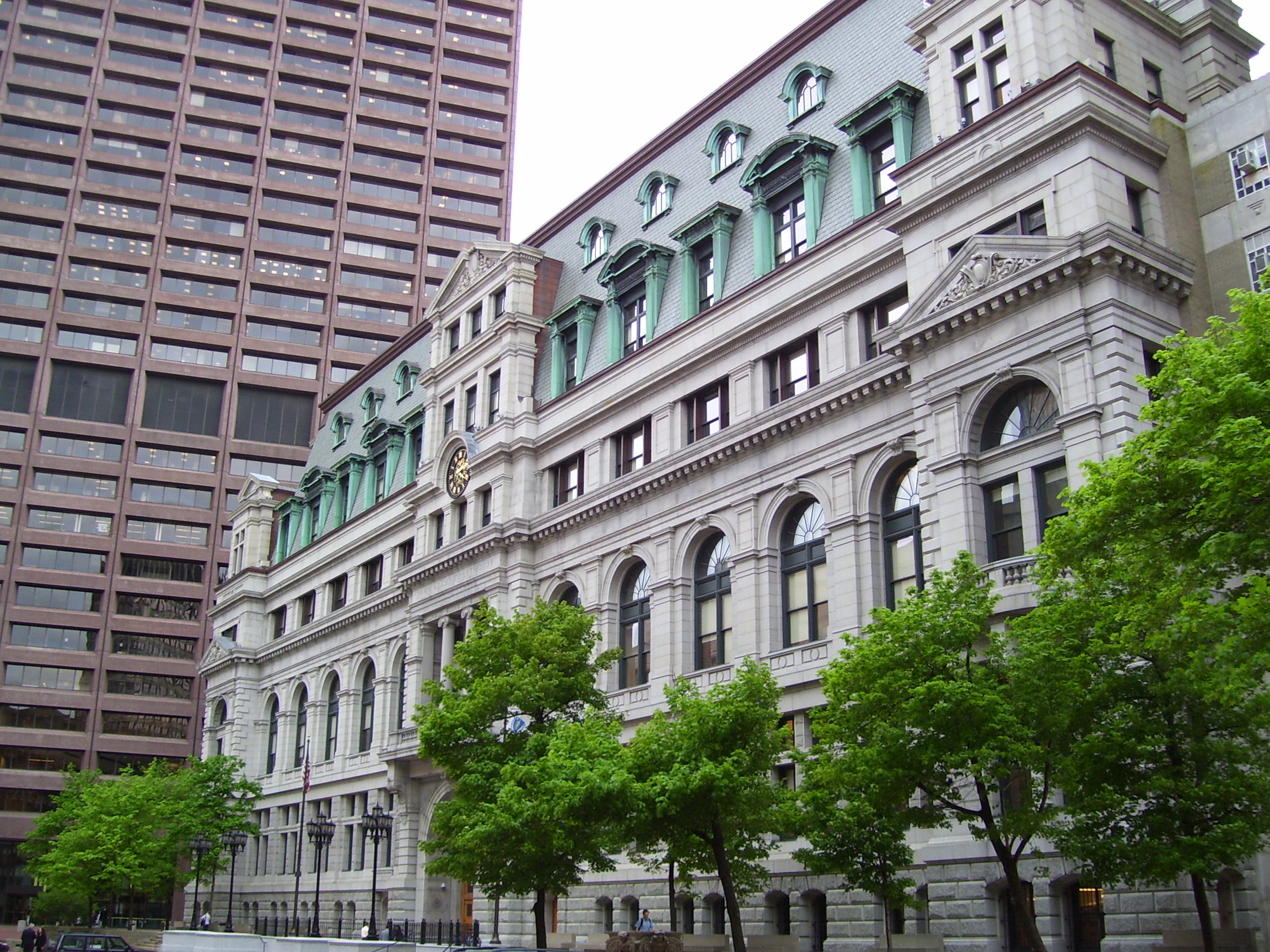
Massachusetts Supreme Judicial Court, Boston, MA

Zoll successfully ran for office as the Mayor of Salem, serving a full term. He left the mayoral office before the end of the second term in 1973 when he accepted his first judicial appointment. In 1973, he was appointed by Governor Sargent to be Special Justice of the Ipswich District Court.

In 1974, he was appointed again by Governor Sargent as Presiding Justice of the Salem District Court. Zoll became Chief Justice of the Massachusetts District Courts in 1976 when he was first appointed by Governor Michael S. Dukakis. Following the passage of the court reform bill in 1993, Chief Justice Zoll was then reappointed as Chief Justice of the District Court in 1998 He chaired the Commonwealth Joint Labor Management Committee which oversees police and fire unions negotiations with the government.

He retired on June 20, 2004, when he reached the age of 70, the mandatory retirement age for judges.

== Honors and awards ==
- The media centre of Salem High School was named The Samuel E. Zoll Instructional Media Center.
- In 2009, Zoll was the keynote speaker for the 100th anniversary of the Congregation Sons of Israel.
- He was awarded honorary degrees from Suffolk University and Salem State College
- In 1991, he received the Brandeis University Award for Distinguished Public Service.

== Family life ==
Zoll and his wife Marjorie lived in Salem. They had four children and five grandchildren.

== Scott Brown ==
U.S. Senator Scott Brown has recalled that, aged twelve, he was brought before Judge Zoll in Salem for shoplifting. Zoll asked Brown if his siblings would like seeing him play basketball in jail, and required him to write a 1,500 word essay on the topic as his punishment. Brown said, "That was the last time I ever stole, the last time I ever thought [about stealing]... The other day I was at Staples, and something was in my cart that I didn't pay for. I had to bring it back because ... I thought of Judge Zoll."

== Other rulings ==
Zoll once required a family to eat dinner together for 30 days and sent a parole officer to make sure they were doing it.

== Death ==
Zoll died on April 26, 2011, at his home in Salem after a year-long battle with gallbladder cancer. He was 76 years of age.

== Note ==
1. Zoll retained the title of Presiding Justice at Salem District Court after being appointed Chief Justice of the District Court System. David T. Doyle (1976 to 1998) and Robert Cornetta (1998 to 2004) served as acting Presiding Justices.

Political offices
Preceded by Francis X. Collins	45th Mayor of Salem, Massachusetts; 1970–1973	Succeeded by Jean A. Levesque
