= Norman Young =

Norman Young may refer to:

- Norm Young, Seventh-day Adventist Christian theologian and New Testament scholar
- Norman G. Young, American civil engineer
- Norman Young (baseball), American baseball player
