= Edward J. Collins Jr. =

American politician

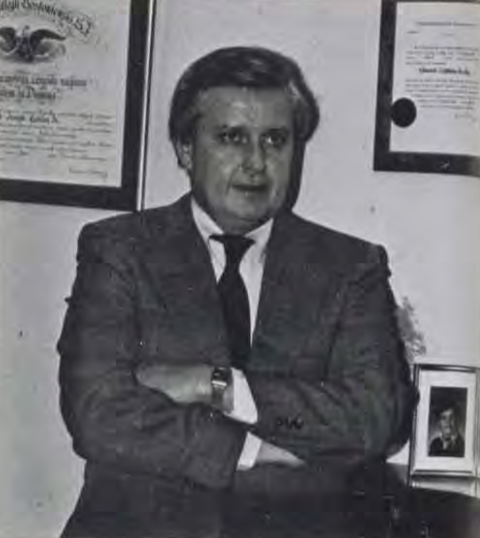

Chief Financial Officer and Treasurer of Boston
- In office 1996–2002
- Mayor: Thomas Menino
- Preceded by: John Simmons
- Succeeded by: Lisa Signori

Town Manager of Saugus
- In office 1992–1996
- Preceded by: Norman B. Hansen
- Succeeded by: Richard Cardillo

Personal details
- Born: Edward Joseph Collins Jr. June 29, 1943 Hyde Park, Massachusetts, U.S.
- Died: January 29, 2007 (aged 63) North Reading, Massachusetts, U.S.
- Spouse: Gail A. Kennedy
- Children: 3
- Education: Boston College (BSBA, LLB)

Edward Joseph Collins Jr. (June 29, 1943 – January 29, 2007) was an American government official for the state of Massachusetts, the town of Saugus and the city of Boston. He is the namesake of the Edward J. Collins Jr. Center for Public Management at the University of Massachusetts Boston.

== Early life ==
Collins was born and raised in Hyde Park. He attended Archbishop Williams High School, Boston College, and Boston College Law School.

== Massachusetts Department of Revenue ==
In 1978 Collins was named a Deputy Commissioner of the Massachusetts Department of Revenue. He was in charge of the newly created Division of Local Services (DLS), which assisted local officials with the complexities of the recently passed Proposition 2½. He also helped create cutting edge computer technology to help cities and towns set and collect property taxes. In 1987, he received the Massachusetts Taxpayers Foundation Award for Outstanding Service to the Commonwealth. He was succeeded by his protégé and future Secretary of Administration and Finance Leslie Kirwan.

== Saugus, Massachusetts ==
Collins was a 30-year resident of Saugus, Massachusetts. He spent one year as a town meeting member and one term (1977 to 1979) as a member of the Board of Selectmen. He then spent ten years as a member of the Board of Appeals.

In 1991 he was named Town Manager of Saugus. He was the architect of the town's Capital Improvement Plan, which resulted in the construction of the new public safety building, senior center, library and public works facility. He also secured funding for the renovation of Saugus Town Hall.

== Boston ==
In 1996, Collins resigned as Saugus Town Manager to become the chief financial officer and treasurer of Boston. In this position he oversaw a $1.8 billion budget and brought fiscal discipline during a time of financial pressure. He was a childhood friend of Mayor Thomas Menino and was seen as part of his "inner circle". In the fall of 2000 he suffered a stroke which limited his ability to work. He retired in 2002, but stayed on as a special advisor until 2005.

== Death and legacy ==
Collins died on January 29, 2007, at his home in North Reading, Massachusetts, after a lengthy illness. In July 2008, the new Center for Public Management was established at the University of Massachusetts Boston by Governor Deval Patrick and the state legislature and was named in his honor.
