= Arthur F. DeFranzo =

United States Army soldier

- Born: March 20, 1919; Saugus, Massachusetts
- Died: June 10, 1944 (aged 25) near Vaubadon, France
- Burial place: Riverside Cemetery; Saugus, Massachusetts
- Military career
- Allegiance: United States of America
- Branch: United States Army
- Service years: 1940 - 1944
- Rank: Staff Sergeant
- Units: 18th Infantry Regiment, 1st Infantry Division
- Conflicts: World War II
- Awards: Medal of Honor

Arthur Frederick DeFranzo (March 20, 1919 – June 10, 1944) was a United States Army soldier and a recipient of the United States military's highest decoration—the Medal of Honor—for his actions in World War II.

== Biography ==
DeFranzo joined the Army from his birthplace of Saugus, Massachusetts, in November 1940, and by June 10, 1944, was serving as a staff sergeant in the 1st Infantry Division. On that day, near Vaubadon, France, he was wounded while rescuing an injured man from hostile fire. Despite his own injuries, he led an attack on the enemy positions and continued to advance and encourage his men even after being hit several more times. He destroyed an enemy machine gun position just before succumbing to his wounds.

For his actions, he was posthumously awarded the Medal of Honor seven months later, on January 4, 1945.

DeFranzo's body returned to the United States in 1947. He lay in state at the Saugus Town Hall from December 8 to December 11, 1947. He was then given a military funeral at Riverside Cemetery in Saugus.

== Medal of Honor citation ==
Staff Sergeant DeFranzo's official Medal of Honor citation reads:

For conspicuous gallantry and intrepidity at the risk of his life, above and beyond the call of duty, on June 10, 1944, near Vaubadon, France. As scouts were advancing across an open field, the enemy suddenly opened fire with several machineguns and hit 1 of the men. S/Sgt. DeFranzo courageously moved out in the open to the aid of the wounded scout and was himself wounded but brought the man to safety. Refusing aid, S/Sgt. DeFranzo reentered the open field and led the advance upon the enemy. There were always at least 2 machineguns bringing unrelenting fire upon him, but S/Sgt. DeFranzo kept going forward, firing into the enemy and 1 by 1 the enemy emplacements became silent. While advancing he was again wounded, but continued on until he was within 100 yards of the enemy position and even as he fell, he kept firing his rifle and waving his men forward. When his company came up behind him, S/Sgt. DeFranzo, despite his many severe wounds, suddenly raised himself and once more moved forward in the lead of his men until he was again hit by enemy fire. In a final gesture of indomitable courage, he threw several grenades at the enemy machinegun position and completely destroyed the gun. In this action, S/Sgt. DeFranzo lost his life, but by bearing the brunt of the enemy fire in leading the attack, he prevented a delay in the assault which would have been of considerable benefit to the foe, and he made possible his company's advance with a minimum of casualties. The extraordinary heroism and magnificent devotion to duty displayed by S/Sgt. DeFranzo was a great inspiration to all about him, and is in keeping with the highest traditions of the armed forces.

== Awards and decorations ==

Badge	Combat Infantryman Badge		
1st row	Medal of Honor Bronze Star Medal		
2nd row	Purple Heart	Army Good Conduct Medal	American Defense Service Medal
3rd row	American Campaign Medal	European–African–Middle Eastern Campaign Medal with 1 Campaign Star	World War II Victory Medal

== See also ==
- List of Medal of Honor recipients for World War II
