= Robert Hagopian =

American lawyer

Robert C. Hagopian

Saugus, Massachusetts Town Manager
- In office 1974–1974
- Preceded by: Francis Moorehouse
- Succeeded by: Maurice Cunningham

Personal details
- Born: January 29, 1911 Boston, Massachusetts
- Died: January 4, 1995 (aged 83) Beverly, Massachusetts
- Party: Republican
- Spouse: Agnes Dadekian Hagopian
- Education: Boston University School of Law
- Occupation: Attorney; Town official School administrator College professor

Robert C. Hagopian (January 29, 1911 – January 4, 1995) was an American attorney, government official, and politician.

== Early life ==
Hagopian was born and raised in Boston, Massachusetts. He attended Boston public schools graduated from Boston University Law School in 1939. He served in the United States Army Air Corps during World War II.

== Government career ==
Hagopian lived in Watertown, Massachusetts for 20 years. From 1955 to 1967 he served as Watertown Town Treasurer.

In 1967 he was an organizer of the ceremony commemorating the 194th anniversary of the Boston Tea Party.

He moved to Hamilton, Massachusetts in 1968 after taking a job as director of development for Gordon College, which was run by his friend James Forrester. He was fired later that year after Forrester's resignation. While in Hamilton, Hagopian would run for public office about 20 times, losing on every occasion. He was known for using his government positions to tweak the establishment. Hagopian's next government position was town counsel in Essex, Massachusetts. He then served as a professor at Salem State College.

In January 1974, Hagopian was appointed to a five-year term as Town Manager of Saugus, Massachusetts. During his tenure he was known for mocking the authority of town officials. This included appointing a recent Saugus High School graduate to serve as the Official Saugus Pigeon Plucker and Boiler of Eggs after receiving a complaint about the pigeons that lived in the bell tower of Saugus Town Hall. Eight months after his hiring, the Board of Selectmen voted to remove him from office on the grounds that they believed that his job performance had been unsatisfactory, that he had failed to demonstrate a clear pattern of leadership for the town, failed to communicate effectively with the Board of Selectmen and Town Meeting, and consistently proven to be uninformed or misinformed on the status of projects.

After his dismissal he sued the town, claiming that they had violated his Due Process rights by failing to identify further the grounds for his removal, preventing him from cross-examining Board members under oath at the public hearing, and dismissing him "without any justifiable cause or basis in fact." He was awarded $30,000 in damages, but the decision was overturned on appeal.

== Personal life ==
Hagopian was married to Agnes Dadekian from 1957 until his death in 1995. The couple was married by James Forrester, who traveled from Inglewood, California to fulfill the promise he made to Hagopian while the two were in the service to perform his wedding. The couple had one son, Robert M. J. Hagopian.

He was a longtime member of the Disabled American Veterans and served a president of their Massachusetts Chapter.
