= Paul Rabchenuk =

American lawyer

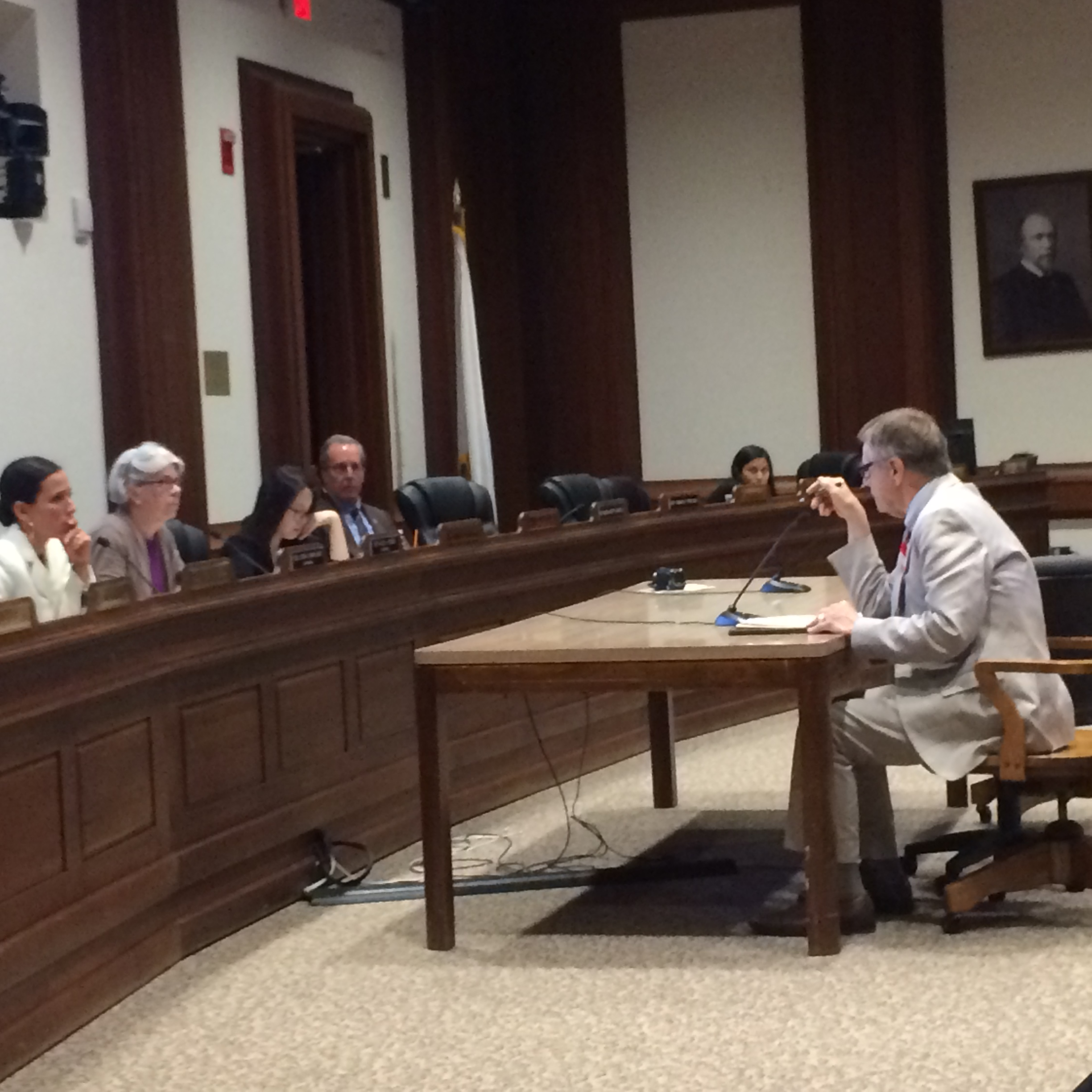

Saugus, Massachusetts Town Manager
- In office 1981–1987
- Preceded by: Robert Cornetta
- Succeeded by: Norman B. Hansen

Personal details
- Party: [Unenrolled]
- Education: New England School of Law; University of Pittsburgh; Tufts University
- Occupation: Attorney; Town official University professor

Paul Thomas Rabchenuk is an American attorney, town administrator, university professor and recognized genocide scholar in the United States and Canada.

Rabchenuk has served as urban renewal director of Nashua, New Hampshire and Haverhill, Massachusetts, town administrator of North Reading, Massachusetts, Town Manager of Saugus, Massachusetts

In 1992 he was the Republican nominee for the Massachusetts Senate seat in the 1st Essex District. He lost to ten-term incumbent Walter J. Boverini 64% to 36%.

Rabchenuk currently practices law in Salem, Massachusetts. He has an expertise in the areas of business and corporate management, planning and development, housing, administrative law, real estate, probate, elder law and international transactions. He is also a visiting professor at Salem State University for nineteen years teaching Civil Rights and Civil Liberties and courses in American Government and Politics.

In April, 2018, he was awarded a citation by the Massachusetts Senate recognizing him for his advocacy for inclusion of genocide study in the state curriculum and for presenting on the need for genocide education at Salem State University. He was also presented with a plaque at Salem State University that recognized him for his countless contributions and accomplishments to commemorate the Ukrainian Famine Genocide, Holodomor, of 1932-1933 and to promote genocide education and awareness.

On June 22, 2018, he was awarded the Seal of the City of Salem, Massachusetts for a lifetime dedicated to the education of Holocaust and Genocide Studies throughout history.

On November 14, 2019, he was inducted into the Northeast Regional Educator Hall of Fame and received the Dr Edna Mauriello '44 Lifetime Achievement Award for his years as an educator and his advocacy of Genocide studies.

On November 14, 2019 he received an Official Citation from the Massachusetts State Senate in recognition of receiving the Dr Edna Mauriello '44 Lifetime Achievement Award by Salem State University at the Northeast Regional Educators Hall of Fame Ceremony.

On November 3, 2022, he in partnership with Salem State University received an official Citation from the Massachusetts State Senate in recognition of a campus poster exhibit to commemorate the 89th anniversary of the Ukrainian Famine Genocide, the Holodomor of 1932-1933.

On November 3, 2022, he received an Official Citation from the Massachusetts House of Representatives in recognition of his partnership with Salem State University in commemorating the Ukrainian Famine Genocide of 1932-1933 and in developing programs to support knowledge of this genocide and awareness and justice for the victims: Holodomor Then; Genocide Now; Justice When?

The Paul Thomas Rabchenuk Scholarship to provide financial assistance to Salem State University students of genocide studies and political science was established in his honor.

Rabchenuk is the chairman of the Greater Boston Committee to Commemorate the Ukrainian Famine Genocide, the Holodomor, 1932-1933, a position he has held since 2007. He has presented at conferences in the United States and Canada advocating genocide education and has given testimony to the Massachusetts Legislature and the Committee on Elementary and Secondary Education for the inclusion of genocide study in the state curriculum. In 2020, the Massachusetts Legislature passed legislation mandating programs to teach genocide in the public schools statewide. The programs he promotes are now being developed by the State’s school districts.
