= Saugus Public Schools =

School district in Massachusetts, United States

Location
- 23 Main Street, Saugus, Massachusetts 01906 United States

District information
- Type: Public
- Motto: "Climbing towards the next summit."
- Grades: PK–12
- Established: 1894; 132 years ago
- Superintendent: Michael Hashem
- Schools: Two elementary schools (PK–5); One middle-high school (6–12)
- Budget: ▲$31,607,625 (FY2024)

Students and staff
- Students: 2,462 (2022–2023)
- Teachers: 187 (2022–2023)
- Student–teacher ratio: 15.9:1

Other information
- Website: www.saugus.k12.ma.us

Saugus Public Schools is the school district of Saugus, Massachusetts, United States.

On April 19, 2016, the School Committee of the district voted 4–1 to offer the position of superintendent to David DeRuosi, who previously was superintendent for Malden Public Schools; Liz Marchese was the sole committee member not in favor. He retired from his position at the end of the 2020–2021 school year. On May 4, 2021, the School Committee voted 4–0 to appoint Erin McMahon to succeed DeRuosi when his contract expired June 30, 2021. She was the district's first female superintendent. On November 2, 2023, the school committee unanimously voted to fire McMahon. Former Saugus High School Principal Michael Hashem served as acting superintendent while McMahon was on administrative leave, beginning in January 2023. The School Committee voted unanimously to offer the position to Hashem on a full time basis on Nov. 2, 2023.

== Schools ==
=== Current ===
Secondary

- Saugus Middle-High School

Primary

- Belmonte STEAM Academy(Former Belmonte Middle School)
- Veterans Memorial Elementary School

=== Former ===
High school

- First Saugus High School (1906–1955) - Prior to the construction of a dedicated High School building, Saugus High classes were held in the Town Hall (now an American Legion hall) and the top floor of the Roby School. The first high school was located on the corner of Central and Winter Streets. The building was expanded several times to accommodate the growing student population. The 1906 High School housed a junior high school and elementary school until a 1963 arson. Only the 1935 addition survived, which remained an elementary school until 2003.
- Second Saugus High School (1955–2020) - The second SHS campus opened in September 1955. The single-story structure included a cafeteria, auditorium, offices, classrooms, and a gymnasium.

Middle School

- Sweetser School (1926–1984) - Junior high school located on Lincoln Avenue at the former site of the Lincoln School. The school had 8 classrooms capable of seating 300 students and a large assembly hall. It was named after its location in the Sweetser Corner neighborhood, which was in turn named after the Sweetser family. When the new Saugus High School building opened in 1955, all middle school classes were moved to the old high school building, with the Sweetser School becoming an elementary school. It closed due to budgetary issues caused by Proposition 2½ and was demolished for senior housing.
- Saugus Junior High School (1955–1966) – When the new Saugus High School building opened in 1955, all middle school classes were moved to the old high school building. In October 1963, most of the Saugus Junior High School was destroyed by arson. Junior High classes were moved to the Veterans' Memorial Elementary School and the American Legion Hall, with seventh and eighth graders attending during the day and ninth graders attending class in the afternoon.
- Augustine J. Belmonte Middle School (1966–2020) – Opened as Saugus Junior High School in 1966, it was renamed in 1970 the Belmonte Middle School after Augustine J. Belmonte, a Saugus police officer killed in the line of duty. The Belmonte closed in 2020 when the middle school was relocated to the new Saugus Middle-High School complex. The school reopened as Belmonte STEAM Academy in 2021 as an upper elementary school, serving grades 2-5.

Primary

- First Saugus Schoolhouse (1775–1801) - Saugus’ first school building was constructed in Saugus Center in 1775. In 1801 a new school was built and the old building was sold to Richard Shute for $65. He moved it from its original site at the east corner of the old burial ground and after some alterations and additions, used it as a grocery store as well as his home. It was destroyed by fire in 1820.
- Second Saugus Schoolhouse (1801–1821) - Located "southwest of the meetinghouse", it was later used by William W. Boardman as a shoe shop.
- Old Rock Schoolhouse (1806–1838) Constructed in 1806, it was the first schoolhouse in East Saugus. In 1838, classes were moved to the new Mansfield School. The building was later destroyed when it fell down a hill during an attempt to move it.

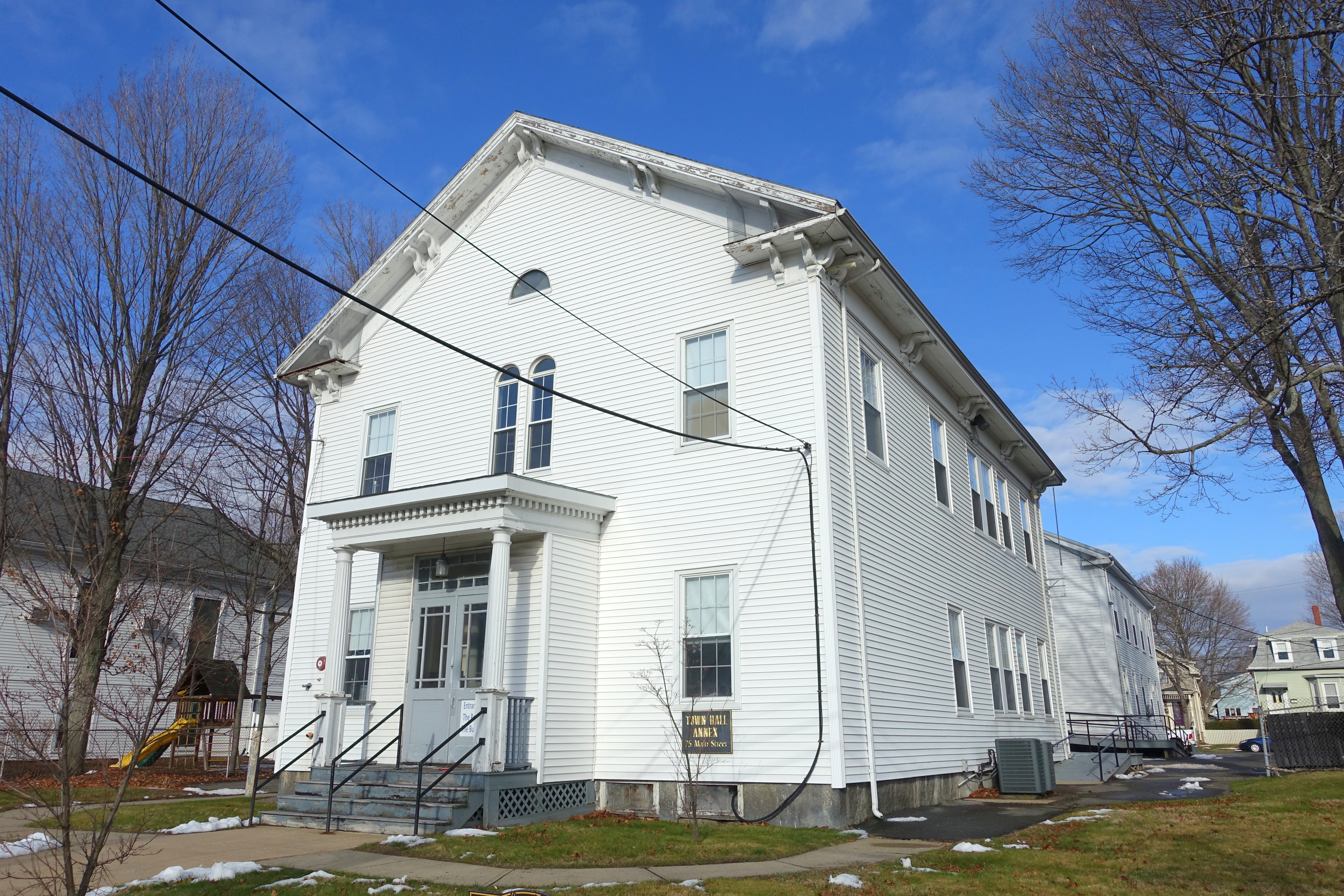
Saugus Town Hall Annex, formerly the Center School

- Center School (1821–1896) - Located at 25 Main Street, the Center School was replaced by the Roby School in 1896, but continued to be used until the 1960s when extra classrooms were needed. It later served as the school administration building until the office was moved to the Roby School. It remains in use as the Town Hall Annex, housing the Planning Board, Conservation Commission, and Historical Commission.
- Lincoln School (1838–1924) Originally known as the Lincoln Avenue School, it was renamed in honor of Abraham Lincoln in 1911. It was found to be unsafe by the state building inspector and closed in 1924. Students and teachers were transferred to the Emerson School, which necessitated the transfer of two grades from the Emerson School to the Ballard School. The Sweetser School was built on this site.
- Mansfield School (1838–1939) Originally known as the Chestnut Street School, it was named after longtime East Saugus school teacher Eliza A. Mansfield in 1911. It was closed in 1939 due to low enrollment.
- North Saugus School (1870–1980) now an office building.
- Armitage School (c. 1885–1984) Originally known as the Essex Street School, it was named after schoolteacher Laura F. Armitage in 1911. Located on the corner of Essex St. and Pleasant Ave., the wooden original building was moved across the street and a new brick building was built in 1922. The school closed in 1984 and is now an apartment building run by the Saugus Housing Authority.
- Cliftondale School (1894–1980) Originally known as the Bond School, it was renamed to the Cliftondale School “due to an unfortunate controversy" in connection with the Bond name. It closed in 1980 and was sublet to the Northshore Education Consortium for ten years before being abandoned. In 1994 the building was renamed in honor of former teacher Marleah E. Graves. In 2007 the building was restored by the MEG Foundation, a community volunteer group. It now serves as a community center.

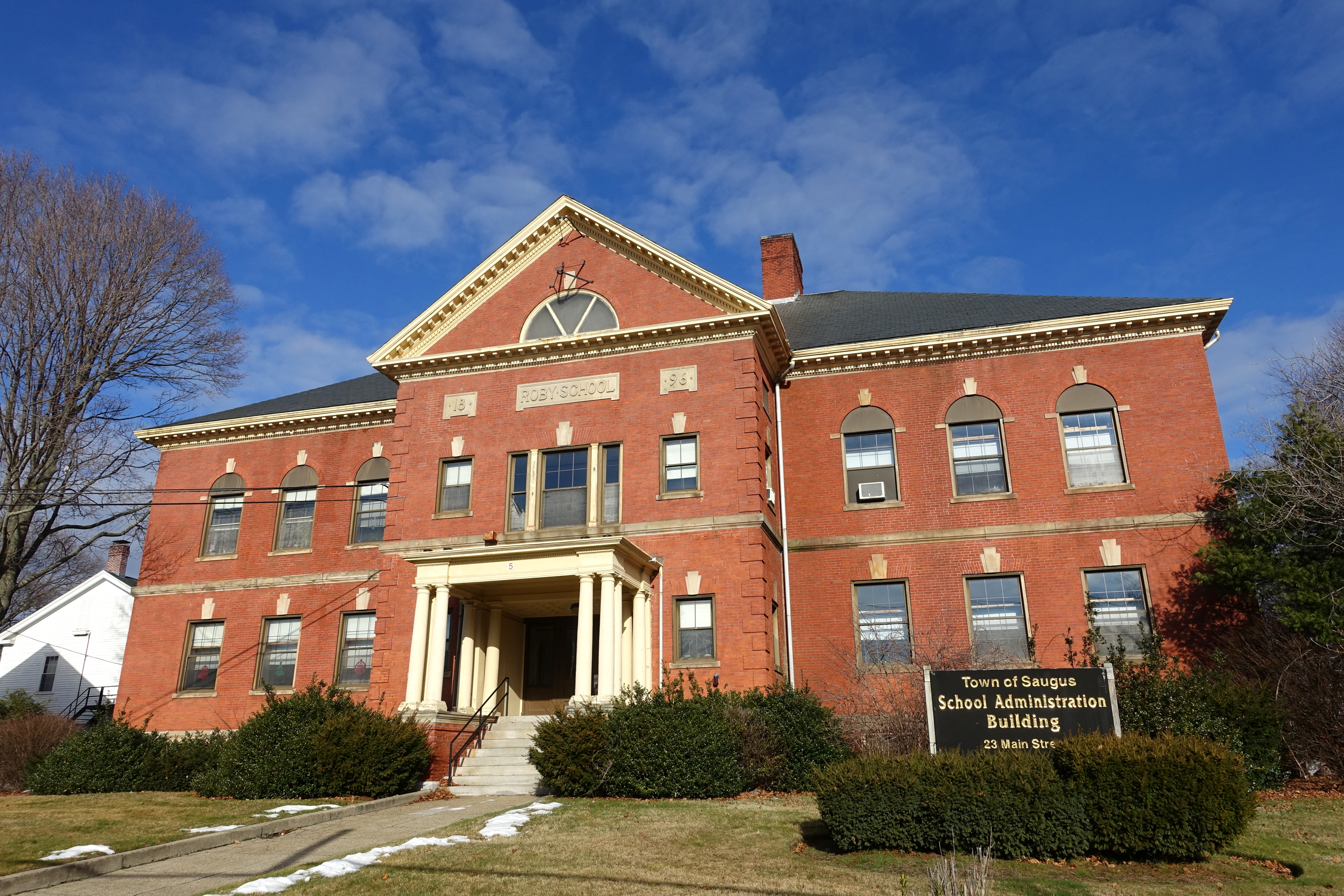
The Roby School, now the Saugus School administration building

- The Roby School (1896–1984) - Former elementary school located on Main St. In 1984 the school was closed and converted into the Saugus School Department's administration building. Named after Joseph Roby.
- Felton School (1900–1978) - Named for noted academic and Saugus native Cornelius Conway Felton, the Felton School was located on Central Street opposite School Street. The school was closed in 1978 and the building was demolished in 1982 after it was found to be structurally unsound. Present site of the Saugus Senior Center.
- Emerson School (1906–????), Named after Rev. Joseph Emerson, a local minister and founder of the Saugus Female Seminary. Now a condominium building.
- Ballard School (1911–2003)/Early Childhood Center (2010–2017) - Located in East Saugus, the school opened in 1911. At the opening ceremony a letter from President William Howard Taft congratulating the town on its new school building was read. In 2003, Saugus Public Schools ceased using the building as an elementary school and it was leased to a preschool. In 2010 it reopened as the town's Early Childhood Center. In 2017 the school closed again and the early childhood classes were moved to other school buildings to save money. The building was abandoned and in 2020 it was transferred from the school department to the town.
- Evans School (1955–2003) – The Evans School was located in the part of the 1906 Saugus High School building that survived the 1963 fire. The school was named after former superintendent, selectman, and state representative Vernon W. Evans.
- Oaklandvale Elementary School
- Lynnhurst Elementary School
- Douglas Waybright School

== Superintendents ==
- Charles E. Stevens (1894–1908)
- Fairfield Whitney (1908–1910)
- William F. Sims (1910–1917)
- Clarence N. Flood (1917–1918)
- Jesse W. Lambert (1918–1933)
- Vernon W. Evans (1933–1951)
- Jesse J. Morgan (1951–1957)
- Rhoden B. Eddy (1957–1965)
- Maurice F. Smith (1965–1968)
- Robert J. Munnelly interim (1968–1969)
- Erwin A. Gallagher (1969–1970)
- Dr. William Kelly (1970–1986)
- William Doyle (1986–1999)
- Dr. Keith Manville (1999–2008)
- Richard Langlois (2008–2013)
- Michael Tempesta (2013–2015)
- Matthew Malone interim (2015–2016)
- Michael Hashem acting (2016, 2023)
- David DeRuosi (2016–2021)
- Erin McMahon (2021–2023)
- Michael Hashem (2023—present)
