= Norman G. Young =

American civil engineer and borough manager (1894-1984)

Town Manager of Saugus, Massachusetts
- In office 1950–1952
- Preceded by: James Shurtleff
- Succeeded by: Walter E. Lawrence

Borough Manager of Phoenixville, Pennsylvania
- In office 1930–1950

Borough Manager of Hollidaysburg, Pennsylvania
- In office 1922–1928
- Succeeded by: Position eliminated

Personal details
- Born: April 16, 1894 Hollidaysburg, Pennsylvania
- Died: October 24, 1984 (aged 90) Nokomis, Florida
- Resting place: Presbyterian Cemetery, Hollidaysburg
- Education: University of Pennsylvania
- Occupation: Civil Engineer

Norman Good Young (April 16, 1894 – October 24, 1984) was an American civil engineer who served as borough manager of Hollidaysburg, Pennsylvania, and Phoenixville, Pennsylvania, and Town Manager of Saugus, Massachusetts.

== Early life ==
Young was born on April 16, 1894, in Hollidaysburg, Pennsylvania, to Michael A. and Anna M. (Good) Young. He graduated from Phillips Andover Academy and the University of Pennsylvania (Class of 1922).

== Career ==
Young was named borough manager of Hollidaysburg, Pennsylvania in 1922. On January 3, 1928, he was relieved of his duties after the borough council, in an effort to cut costs, voted to eliminate the position. In 1929 he was hired to work for the engineering department of DuPont. From 1930 to 1950 he was borough manager of Phoenixville, Pennsylvania. In 1950 he was appointed town manager of Saugus, Massachusetts. He was recommended for the position by Cambridge, Massachusetts City Manager John B. Atkinson. On January 30, 1952, Young resigned his position effect March 1 to become city engineer of Chester, Pennsylvania. At $9,000 a year, he was Chester's highest paid employee at the time of his hiring. He remained in this position until his retirement in 1967.

== Later life and death ==
After his retirement, Young settled in Nokomis, Florida. He died on October 24, 1984, after a long illness.
