= Maurice Cunningham =

Saugus, Massachusetts Town Manager
- In office 1974–1976
- Preceded by: Robert Hagopian
- Succeeded by: George O. Gregson

Personal details
- Born: February 11, 1940
- Died: May 6, 2006 (aged 66) Bonita Springs, Florida
- Party: Democratic
- Education: Boston College; Suffolk University Law School

Maurice F. Cunningham was an American attorney, educator, and political figure who served as Town Manager of Saugus, Massachusetts from 1974 to 1976.

== Early life ==
The son of Judge C. Carol Cunningham and Theresa I. (Conner) Cunningham, Cunningham grew up in Saugus. He graduated from Boston College's School of Education in 1961 with a B.S. in history. He was also vice president of his class, co-chairman of the Jazz Committee, a member of the Student Senate, and a member of the Class Council. After graduating he began working in the Saugus Public School system. In 1965 he graduated from the Suffolk University Law School with a Bachelor of Law degree.

== Board of Selectmen ==
From 1963 to 1967, Cunningham was a Saugus town meeting member. He also served as acting town moderator.

In 1967, Cunningham was elected to the Saugus Board of Selectmen. He topped the ticket with 4,388 votes and was named chairman of the board.

During his tenure on the board, the selectmen unanimously voted not to renew Town Manager Paul H. Boucher's contract. To replace him, the board selected Clarence Wilkinson over former Keene, New Hampshire City Manager Frank A. Saia by 3 to 2 vote, with Cunningham voting for Saia.

Cunningham was a candidate for the Massachusetts House of Representatives in 1968. He won the Democratic nomination, but lost to Belden Bly in the general election 6059 votes to 5188.

== Town Manager ==
In 1974, Cunningham was chosen by the Board of Selectmen to replace Robert Hagopian as town manager. He was later given a five-year contract by the board and the School Committee granted him a two-year leave of absence from his position as assistant principal of the Saugus Junior High School. During his tenure, Cunningham was heavily involved in getting community development grants and funds for new sewers and water extension programs. In 1975, $30,000 in municipal funds (about $19,000 in cash and $11,000 in checks) were stolen from a vault the Collector–Treasurer's office. Cunningham stated that he could not explain why the money had not been deposited in a local bank as it usually was.

In 1976, the School Committee unanimously voted not to extend Cunningham's leave and he stepped down as Town Manager.

== Later life and death ==
Cunningham later left the Saugus school system and moved to North Andover, Massachusetts. He opened a firm that assisted professionals establish non-investment second incomes. He then worked as an attorney specializing in personal injury and worker's compensation. In 1991 he negotiated the largest settlement for an industrial accident case in Massachusetts history. He later retired to Bonita Springs, Florida.

Cunningham died on May 6, 2006, after a long illness.
