= Patrick Cusick =

American civil engineer (1919–2018)

Patrick J. Cusick, Jr.

Pittsburgh Regional Planning Association Executive Director
- In office 1957–1964
- Preceded by: Park Martin
- Succeeded by: William Froehlich

Saugus, Massachusetts Temporary Town Manager
- In office February 1, 1950 – March 31, 1950
- Preceded by: James Shurtleff
- Succeeded by: Carl A. Chapman (Temporary)

Personal details
- Born: September 2, 1919 Pittsburgh, Pennsylvania
- Died: February 26, 2018 (aged 98) Phoenix, Arizona
- Spouse: Virginia Johnston Cusick (m. 1949)
- Education: University of Pittsburgh; Harvard University
- Occupation: Civil Engineer; City Planner

Patrick J. Cusick, Jr. (September 2, 1919 – February 26, 2018) was an American civil engineer and city planner who served as Executive Director of the Pittsburgh Regional Planning Association, General Manager of the Litchfield Park Land and Development Company, and President of the Greater Hartford Community Development Corporation.

== Early life ==
A native of Pittsburgh, Cusick attended the University of Pittsburgh, where he was president of the student-faculty association and played on the hockey team. After graduation, he worked for Turner Construction. During World War II he served as a lieutenant in the United States Navy's Civil Engineer Corps. In 1949 he earned a master's degree in civil planning from Harvard University. On July 9, 1949, he married Virginia Johnston.

== Saugus, Massachusetts ==
Cusick's first civil engineering position was in Saugus, Massachusetts, where he served as town engineer. On February 1, 1950, he was named temporary Town Manager after James Shurtleff resigned to take a similar position in Medford, Massachusetts. Cusick accepted the position with the condition that he would resign if he was not given the job permanently by March 31. The selectmen did not appoint him permanent manager by Cusick's deadline and he resigned.

While working for Saugus, Cusick was appointed by Boston mayor James Michael Curley to serve on a special committee to find a location for a steel mill in the Boston area.

== Medford, Massachusetts ==
After leaving Saugus, Cusick joined Shurtleff in Medford as assistant city manager and planning director.

== Rockville, Maryland ==
Between his time in Medford and Pittsburgh, Cusick served as planning director of Montgomery County, Maryland.

== Pittsburgh Regional Planning Association ==
In 1953, Cusick joined the Pittsburgh Regional Planning Association (PRPA) as assistant director. In 1957 he was promoted to executive director following the resignation of Park Martin.

During his tenure with the PRPA, Cusick helped plan many regional communities and developed Pittsburgh's Golden Triangle Master Plan.

In 1961, Cusick was the founding Executive Director of the six county Southwestern Pennsylvania Regional Planning Commission (SPRPC), which was later incorporated into the ten county Southwestern Pennsylvania Commission (SPC).

== Litchfield Park, Arizona ==
Cusick left Pittsburgh in 1964 to become vice president and general manager of the Litchfield Park Land and Development Co., a subsidiary of the Goodyear Tire and Rubber Company. Goodyear planned to turn a 14,000 acre property they owned into a 90,000 resident community. The plan called for 25,000 homes, a college, a junior college, eighteen elementary schools, ten junior high schools, and six high schools as well as improvements to the town's golf course and its harness track at an expense of at least $750 million. Cusick left Litchfield Park in 1971. Goodyear would later abandon their plans for Litchfield Park before they were completed and sold whatever land they could.

== Greater Hartford Community Development Corp. ==
In 1971, Cusick was named president of the Greater Hartford Community Development Corporation, a newly formed not-for-profit organization privately financed by members Hartford's business community tasked with finding out what people wanted in their city, developing new education, health, living, and transportation systems, and building three 30,000-person communities.

== Later career ==
Cusick left the Greater Hartford Community Development Corp. in 1973 to work for Hayden Associates Inc., where he remained until his retirement in 1985. He died on February 26, 2018, at his home in Phoenix, Arizona

== See also ==
- Renaissance I
