= Walter E. Lawrence =

American politician (1905-1967)

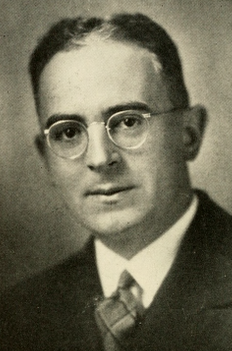
- Walter Lawrence Massachusetts House of Representatives 1939

Haverhill, Massachusetts City Manager
- In office 1964–1967
- Preceded by: James Ginty (Acting)
- Succeeded by: James Ginty (Acting)

Provincetown, Massachusetts Town Manager
- In office 1960–1964
- Preceded by: John C. Snow (Acting)
- Succeeded by: Robert Hancock

Saugus, Massachusetts Town Manager
- In office 1952–1956
- Preceded by: Norman G. Young; Delmont Goding (Temporary)
- Succeeded by: Charles C. DeFronzo (Temporary); Daniel E. McLean

Mayor of Medford, Massachusetts
- In office 1944–1949
- Preceded by: John C. Carr; George L. Callahan (acting)
- Succeeded by: Frederick T. McDermott

Member of the Massachusetts House of Representatives from the 26th Middlesex District
- In office 1939–1944
- Preceded by: Rufus Bond
- Succeeded by: Norman S. Baxter

Personal details
- Born: December 8, 1905 Somerville, Massachusetts
- Died: April 9, 1967 (aged 61) Bremen, Maine
- Party: Republican
- Occupation: Contractor; City Administrator; Politician

Walter Edward Lawrence (December 8, 1905 Somerville, Massachusetts – April 9, 1967 Haverhill, Massachusetts) was an American politician and city manager who served as a member of Massachusetts House of Representatives and as Mayor of Medford.

== Early life ==
Lawrence was born on December 8, 1905, to George Bertram Lawrence and Della (Chievney) Lawrence.

Lawrence attended Medford Public Schools, Northeastern Preparatory School, the Lowell Institute, and Tufts College Engineering School. He worked as a civil engineer prior to entering politics.

On June 19, 1930, he married Helen Jones.

== Early political career ==
From 1934 to 1939, Lawrence was a member of the Medford Board of Aldermen. He was a member of the Massachusetts House of Representatives from 1939 to 1944.

In 1941, Lawrence was a candidate for Mayor of Medford. He narrowly defeated Leland C. Bickford in the Republican primary, but lost in the general election to incumbent John C. Carr 11,500 votes to 11,039.

== Mayor of Medford ==
Lawrence ran again in 1943. This time he was successful, defeating fellow Representative Michael F. Skerry.

During his time as mayor, Lawrence had to deal with shortages from wartime rationing. Because of a shortage of paper, Lawrence requested that citizens separate paper from their other garbage. Any barrels with salvageable paper were not collected by the city.

Also during Lawrence's tenure, the City of Medford attempted to control juvenile delinquency by establishing a Youth Commission, creating three new playgrounds, constructing a public swimming pool, and sponsoring activities for boys.

Medford was chosen to host the first day of Massachusetts’ week-long celebration of the United States' victory over Japan. As a tribute to the veterans who died in the war, Lawrence oversaw the construction of Memorial Stadium and a memorial tablet in Barry Park.

In 1945, the Board of Aldermen chose not to give the job of Fire Chief to Acting Chief John Plante, as he ranked below two World War I veterans on the civil service list. Instead of giving the job to one of the other two men, Lawrence used a clause in the city charter to appoint himself to the position and name Plante as his assistant. This allowed Plante to remain as acting chief. In 1948, the civil service list was reissued and Plante once again fell behind John J. E. Gorham, whom Lawrence named chief on February 10, 1948.

In 1948, Lawrence challenged Angier Goodwin for the Republican nomination for Goodwin's seat in the United States House of Representatives. He lost to the incumbent 12,709 votes to 10,579.

In 1949, Medford switched to a Plan E form of Government, which meant that the Mayor would no longer be popularly elected, but instead chosen by the City Council. On December 1, 1949, Alderman Frederick T. McDermott was chosen by the Board to become the city's first Mayor under the new form of government, ending Lawrence's tenure as Mayor.

In 1950, Lawrence ran for Sheriff of Middlesex County. He finished second out of seven candidates in the Republican primary.

In 1951, Lawrence was elected to Medford's first City Council.

== Town Manager ==
On May 2, 1952, Lawrence was named Town Manager of Saugus, Massachusetts.

In 1953 he sold the land opposite Saugus High School to developers for the construction of the New England Shopping Center (which was later redeveloped into the Square One Mall).

On January 31, 1956, the Board of Selectmen passed a preliminary resolution to hold a vote to remove Lawrence from office on March 3, 1956, as they no longer had confidence in him as town manager, they had been informed that he no longer wanted to serve as town manager, and the interests of the town would be best served by removing him from office. On February 3, 1956, Lawrence filed an injunction in Essex Superior Court that would prevent the Selectmen from removing him from office and prevent Charles C. DeFronzo from becoming temporary manager. Lawrence claimed that the Selectmen did not follow the proper procedure for removing him because they did not "detail the specific reasons for his proposed removal". The case was dismissed and a year later the Massachusetts Supreme Judicial Court affirmed the lower court's decision.

In 1960, Lawrence was appointed Town Manager of Provincetown, Massachusetts. That August he made a request to the state government to provide financial aid to help fight the infiltration of Beatniks into the town.

On July 15, 1964, Lawrence left his post in Provincetown to become city manager of Haverhill, Massachusetts. During his time in Haverhill, Lawrence clashed with the school committee over the school department's budget, fought against excess sick leave by city employees, and allowed Amesbury High School to hold classes in the former Haverhill High School building while Amesbury's building was under construction.

In March 1967, Lawrence was hospitalized and Public Works Commissioner James Ginty was named acting manager. On April 9, 1967, Lawrence died following a long illness.

== See also ==
- Massachusetts legislature: 1939, 1941–1942, 1943–1944
