= Leslie Kirwan =

American politician

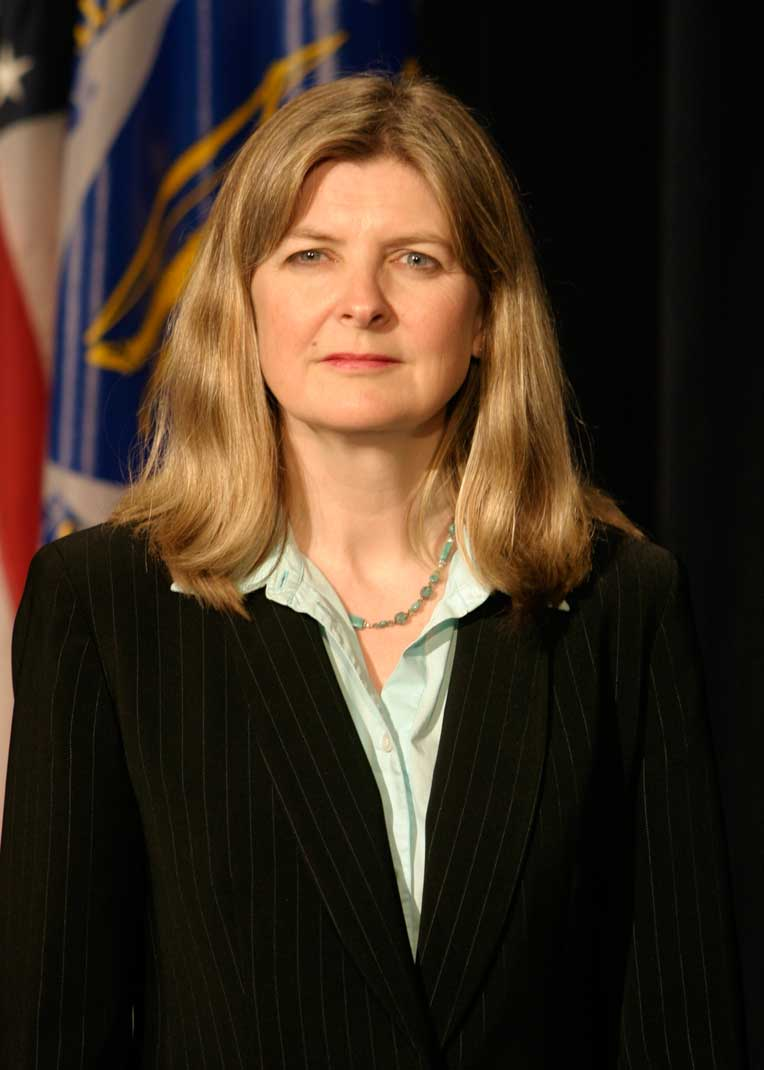

Secretary of Administration and Finance of Massachusetts
- In office 2007–2009
- Governor: Deval Patrick
- Preceded by: Thomas Trimarco
- Succeeded by: Jay Gonzalez

Personal details
- Born: April 1, 1957 (age 69)
- Education: Harvard-Radcliffe (AB); John F. Kennedy School of Government (MPP)

Leslie A. Kirwan (born April 1, 1957) is an American government official who served as Secretary of Administration and Finance of Massachusetts from 2007 to 2009.

== Early life ==
A native of Cambridge, Massachusetts, Kirwan earned an A.B. from Harvard-Radcliffe in 1979 and a Master of Public Policy degree from Harvard's John F. Kennedy School of Government in 1984.

== Department of Revenue ==
In 1985, Kirwan joined the Massachusetts Department of Revenue as a manager in the Division of Local Services. In this role she oversaw the management of local budgets, the distribution of local aid, and coordinated state response to local financial emergencies. From 1991 to 1995 she was the Department's deputy commissioner, succeeding her mentor Edward J. Collins, Jr.

== Undersecretary Administration and Finance ==
In 1995, Kirwan moved to the Office of Administration and Finance, where she was the undersecretary/chief of staff to Charlie Baker In this position she served as the Office's second in command and assisted Baker in a wide variety of issues, which included coordinating the state's revenue optimization effort and leading the Office's relations with local government.

== Massport ==
From 1997 to 2004, Kirwan was the Director of Administration and Finance at the Massachusetts Port Authority (Massport). As Director of Administration and Finance, she served as Massport's Chief Financial Officer, leading an 80-person department responsible for all of the Authority's financial duties. She also led Massport's financial recovery following the September 11 attacks.

== Secretary Administration and Finance ==
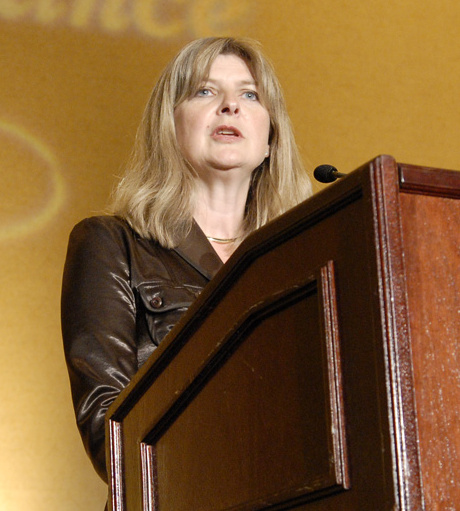
Kirwan speaking in 2007

On December 6, 2006, Governor-elect Deval Patrick announced that Kirwan would be his Secretary of Administration and Finance. She was the first person to be named to Patrick's cabinet and the first woman to serve as Secretary of Administration and Finance. As Secretary of Administration and Finance, Kirwan managed over 2,500 state employees and was responsible for preparing the governor's budget recommendation, developing and analyzing fiscal policy, developing the Commonwealth's capital budget, and monitoring and managing the state government's budgetary activities. She also oversaw the activities of agencies and divisions ranging from the Department of Revenue to the Divisions of Human Resources and Information Technology.

=== Salvatore DiMasi trial ===
Kirwan was a witness for the prosecution in the corruption trial of former Massachusetts House Speaker Salvatore DiMasi. She testified that DiMasi had an unusually persistent interest in the Commonwealth's acquisition of a data-collection software package from Cognos. Kirwan stated that she believed that it was not right time for the government to purchase such as package and that the $15 million asking price was too much, but eventually purchased the software for a reduced price of $13 million in an effort to appease DiMasi.

== Harvard University ==
On September 25, 2009, Harvard University's Faculty of Arts and Sciences Dean Michael D. Smith announced that Kirwan was to become the Faculty of Arts and Sciences Dean for Administration and Finance, effective November 2, 2009. She retired in 2021.
