= Rufus Bond =

American athlete, coach, and politician (1896–1971)

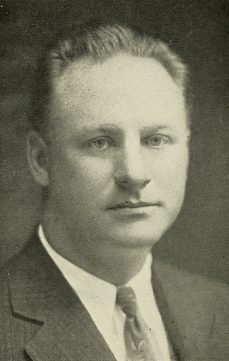
- Bond as a member of the Massachusetts House of Representatives

Biographical details
- Born: December 24, 1896; Everett, Massachusetts, U.S.
- Died: May 7, 1971 (aged 74); Malden, Massachusetts, U.S.

Playing career

Football
- 1916: Harvard

Baseball
- 1919: Harvard

Coaching career (HC unless noted)

Men's basketball
- 1922–1923: Winchester HS (MA)
- 1923–1929: Northeastern
- 1929–1931: Brown
- 1931–1933: Harvard (freshmen)

Baseball
- 1923: Winchester HS (MA)
- 1924–1929: Northeastern
- 1930–1931: Brown (freshmen)
- 1932–1933: Harvard (freshmen)

Football
- 1919–1920: Newton Country Day School
- 1922: Winchester HS (MA)
- 1926–1929: Harvard (freshmen asst.)
- 1930: Brown (freshmen)
- 1931–1932: Harvard (freshmen)

Head coaching record
- Overall: 55–81 (.404) (college basketball); 28–43 (.394) (college baseball)

Accomplishments and honors

Championships
- 1914 High School Football National Championship

Member of the Massachusetts House of Representatives from the 26th Middlesex District
- In office 1935–1938
- Preceded by: John J. Irwin / Donald N. Sleeper^{1}
- Succeeded by: Walter E. Lawrence

Personal details
- Party: Republican
- Education: Harvard College; Northeastern University School of Law

Rufus Hallowell Bond (December 24, 1896 – May 7, 1971) was an American athlete, coach, and politician who played halfback for the 1914 High School Football National Championship team at Everett High School in Everett, Massachusetts and was the head men's basketball coach at Northeastern and Brown. After his coaching career, Bond served two terms in the Massachusetts House of Representatives and was a candidate for the United States House of Representatives.

== Playing ==
Bond was born on December 24, 1896, in Everett. He played halfback for the 1913 Everett High School that won the Suburban League title and beat Lafayette High School of Buffalo, New York 33–0. In 1914, EHS went 13–0 and outscored their opponents 600 to 0. Bond scored 22 touchdowns and earned All-Scholastic honors. Everett beat Oak Park High School 80–0 to become the first high school football team from Massachusetts to lay claim to an undisputed national championship. He also played catcher for the EHS baseball team.

Bond played for the Harvard Crimson freshman football team in 1915 and was a member of the 1916 Harvard Crimson varsity football team. On July 22, 1918, Bond entered the United States Naval Reserve and was assigned to the training camp at Bumpkin Island. Later that year, he was promoted chief boatswain's mate and entered the officer material school at Harvard. He was appointed an ensign on February 20, 1919, and released from active duty the following day. That spring, he played catcher for Harvard's varsity baseball team.

== Coaching ==
Bond graduated from Harvard College in 1919 and became head football coach at the Newton Country Day School that fall. He coached the football and baseball teams at Winchester High School during the 1922–23 school year.

From 1923 to 1929, Bond was the head men's basketball coach at Northeastern University. He amassed an overall record of 39–59. From 1924 to 1929, he was the head coach of the Northeastern Huskies baseball team. In 1926, he led the team to its first-ever winning season with a 7–6 record. He compiled a 28–43 record over his six seasons as head coach. In 1926, Bond became the backfield coach for Harvard's freshman football team.

From 1929 to 1931, Bond was the varsity men's basketball and freshman baseball and football coach at Brown University. He led Brown's basketball team to a 16–22 record over two seasons.

In 1931, Bond returned to Harvard as freshman football, baseball, and basketball coach. He was let go in 1933 as part of cost-cutting measures by the Harvard Athletic Association.

== Legal career ==
Bond graduated from Northeastern University School of Law in 1924 and joined the firm of Stover, Sweetser and Lombard. In 1950, he formed the firm of Bond and Nickerson.

== Politics ==
Bond was a member of the Medford, Massachusetts School Committee from 1928 to 1934 and was chairman of the board from 1932 to 1933. From 1935 to 1938, he represented the 26th Middlesex District in the Massachusetts House of Representatives. Bond was the Republican nominee for Massachusetts's 8th congressional district seat in the 1938 United States House of Representatives elections. He lost to Democratic incumbent Arthur Daniel Healey 55% to 45%. Following his defeat, he was named an assistant district attorney of Middlesex County, Massachusetts by district attorney-elect Robert F. Bradford. In 1941, he was an unsuccessful candidate for mayor of Medford, finishing third in the Republican primary behind Walter E. Lawrence and Leland C. Bickford.

In 1942, Bond was named executive secretary of the Massachusetts Department of Public Safety. In 1953, he was appointed to the newly created position of deputy commissioner of Public Safety. He left the department in 1955 and was elected president of the Medford Cooperative Bank not long after.

== Personal life ==
A Baptist, Bond was the longtime treasurer of the Massachusetts Baptist Convention and was elected president of the organization in 1962.

On September 15, 1919, Bond married Emily Frances Briggs. They had two daughters – Lucille and Eleanor. Emily Bond died suddenly on July 18, 1958, at the family's summer home in Old Orchard Beach, Maine. His second wife, Edith M. Zibelli, was the director of youth work for the Massachusetts Baptist Convention. She died on March 29, 1962.

Bond died on May 7, 1971, in Malden, Massachusetts. He was survived by his third wife, the former Jean Zibelli, and his two daughters.

== Notes ==
1. The 26th Middlesex District sent three representatives to the Massachusetts House of Representatives during Bond's tenure. In 1935, Bond and Robert P. Campbell succeeded John J. Irwin and Donald N. Sleeper. The third member, Arthur L. Youngman, was reelected.
