= Herbert Tuckerman =

American politician (1921-2007)

Member of the Massachusetts Senate from the Second Essex district
- In office 1957–1959
- Preceded by: C. Henry Glovsky
- Succeeded by: Kevin B. Harrington

Member of the Massachusetts House of Representatives from the 15th Essex district
- In office 1953–1957
- Preceded by: C. Henry Glovsky
- Succeeded by: Clarence Wilkinson

Personal details
- Born: May 2, 1921 Boston
- Died: August 8, 2007 (aged 86) Danvers, Massachusetts
- Resting place: Harmony Gardens Cemetery; Salem, Massachusetts
- Party: Republican
- Spouse(s): Sarah Cole (1946–1998; her death); Carol Crumpton (1998–2007; his death)
- Education: Harvard University
- Occupation: Insurance agent

Herbert Sears Tuckerman (May 2, 1921 – August 8, 2007) was an American politician who served in the Massachusetts House of Representatives and the Massachusetts Senate.

== Early life ==
Tuckerman was born on May 2, 1921, in Boston. His father Bayard Tuckerman Jr. was a jockey, businessman, and politician who helped found Suffolk Downs. His mother, Phyllis (Sears) Tuckerman was the daughter of Herbert M. Sears, an early financier of the first textile mills in Lowell and one of the richest men in Boston. Tuckerman grew up in Boston and Hamilton, Massachusetts.

Tuckerman attended Harvard University, where he was a member of the Porcellian Club and the Hasty Pudding Institute. In 1941 he left college to join the United States Army. He served under General George Patton, who was a fellow resident of Hamilton. On Victory in Europe Day, Tuckerman took custody of Reich Minister of the Interior Wilhelm Frick, who was later hanged.

After the war, Tuckerman became a partner at the insurance firm Obrion, Russell & Co.

In 1946 he married Sarah Cole. They had two children.

== Political career ==
Tuckerman served in the Massachusetts House of Representatives from 1953 to 1957 and the Massachusetts Senate from 1957 to 1959. He was a delegate to the 1956 Republican National Convention. He was a candidate for Lieutenant Governor of Massachusetts in 1958, but dropped out at the convention.

== Later life and death ==
Tuckerman's wife died in 1998. Shortly after her death he married Carol Crumpton.

On August 4, 2007, he was diagnosed with leukemia. Four days later he died at a hospice in Danvers, Massachusetts.

== See also ==
- 1955–1956 Massachusetts legislature
