= Jay Gonzalez (politician) =

American politician (born 1971)

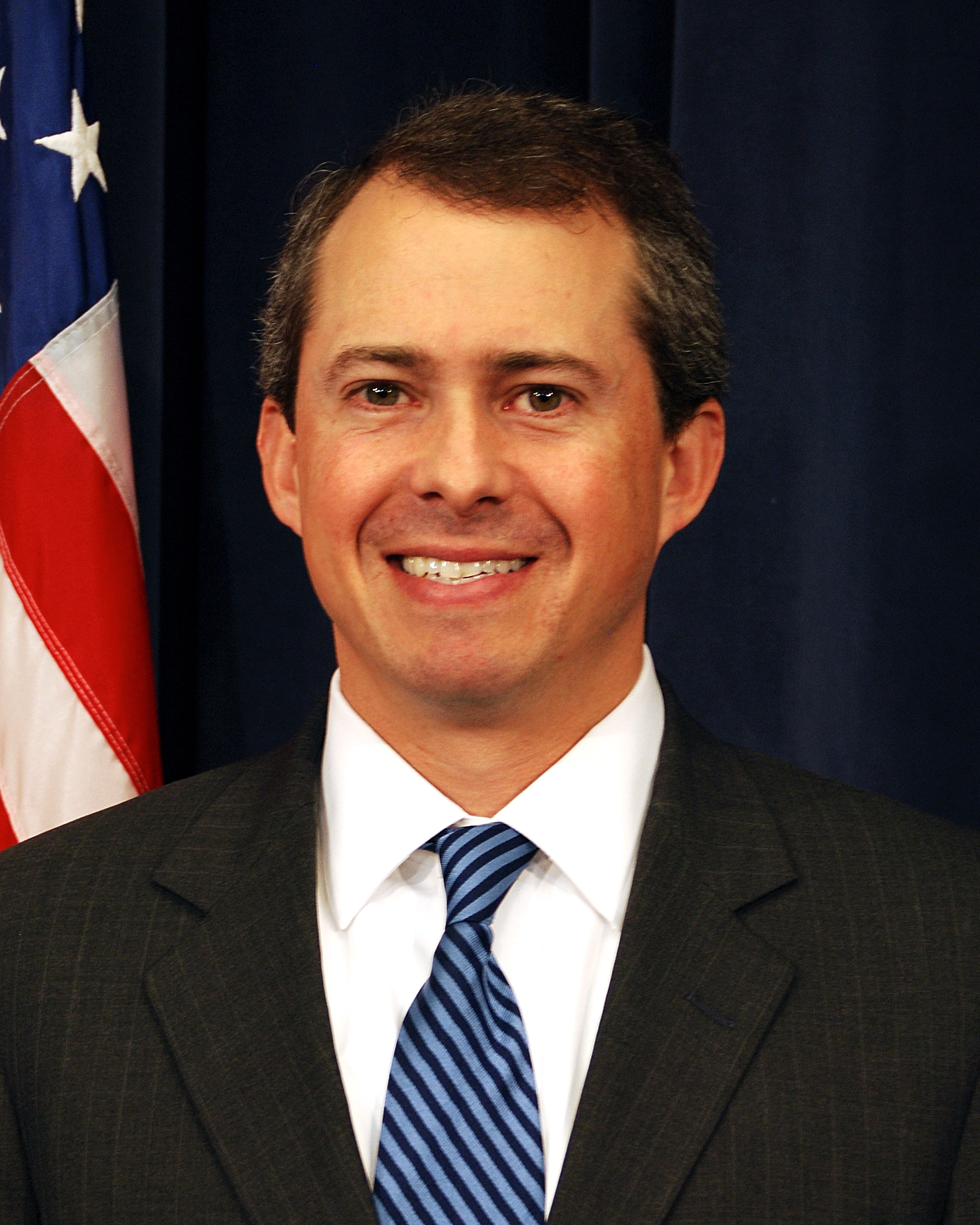

15th President of Curry College
- Incumbent
- Assumed office June 21, 2023
- Preceded by: Kenneth K. Quigley Jr.

Secretary of Administration and Finance of Massachusetts
- In office October 2009 – January 8, 2013
- Governor: Deval Patrick
- Preceded by: Leslie Kirwan
- Succeeded by: Glen Shor

Personal details
- Born: Juan Manuel Gonzalez; January 8, 1971 (age 55) Cleveland, Ohio, U.S.
- Party: Democratic
- Spouse: Cyndi Gonzalez
- Children: 2
- Education: Dartmouth College (BA); Georgetown University (JD)

Juan Manuel "Jay" Gonzalez (born January 8, 1971) is an American academic and government administrator who is the president of Curry College. He served Secretary of Administration and Finance of Massachusetts under Governor Deval Patrick from 2009 to 2013 and was the Democratic nominee for Governor of Massachusetts in 2018, losing in a landslide to incumbent Governor Charlie Baker.

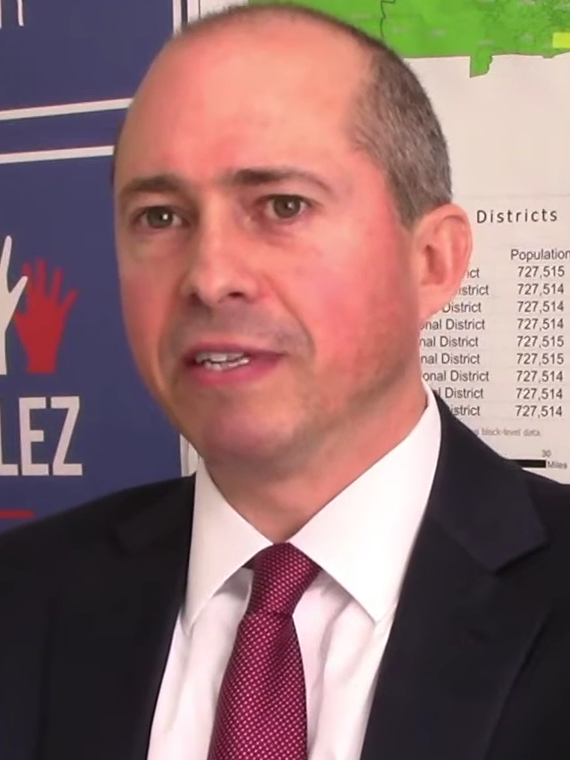
Gonzalez in 2018

== Early life ==
Gonzalez was born and raised in Cleveland, Ohio. His mother dropped out of college when he was born, and his father was a Spanish immigrant who worked as a bricklayer. After graduating from Dartmouth College and Georgetown Law School, Gonzalez worked at a law firm in Cleveland. In 1998, he moved to Boston to work for Palmer & Dodge where he specialized in public finance.

== Career ==
=== Patrick as governor ===
Gonzalez worked on Deval Patrick's 2006 gubernatorial campaign. He then joined Patrick's administration in 2007 as Deputy Secretary of Administration and Finance of Massachusetts.

He was appointed Secretary of Administration and Finance of Massachusetts in 2009 after the resignation of Leslie Kirwan. He also served as Chairman of the Board of the Massachusetts Health Connector, where he oversaw implementation of Massachusetts’ health care reform, co-chaired the Massachusetts Life Sciences Center, and served as chair of the Massachusetts Board of Early Education and Care. Gonzalez left the cabinet in 2013.

After leaving the Patrick administration, Gonzalez served as president and CEO of CeltiCare Health and New Hampshire Healthy Families.

=== 2018 gubernatorial bid ===
On January 30, 2017 he announced he would run for governor in the 2018 Massachusetts election. He defeated Bob Massie, an entrepreneur and sustainability advocate from Somerville, to become the Democratic nominee in the race. On June 2, 2018, at the Democratic State Convention, Gonzalez won 70% of the vote, securing the endorsement of the state party. Gonzalez lost the general election, securing 886,281 votes to incumbent Charlie Baker's 1,781,982. In April 2019, Gonzalez joined the law firm Hinckley, Allen, & Snyder LLP as a partner in the firm's Boston office.

=== Later career ===
In 2021, Gonzalez served as a co-chair of the committee facilitating Michelle Wu's transition into the office of mayor of Boston. On June 21, 2023, Gonzalez was named as the 15th president of Curry College in Milton, Massachusetts.

== Personal life ==
Gonzalez lives with his wife, Cyndi, in the Jamaica Plain neighborhood of Boston, and he has two daughters, Isabel and Abby. As a former Brookline resident, Gonzalez was an elected Town Meeting Member, Co-Chair of the Town Meeting Members Association, and a member of the Advisory Committee in the Town of Brookline.

Political offices
Preceded by Leslie Kirwan	Massachusetts Secretary of Administration and Finance; 2009–2013	Succeeded by Glen Shor
Party political offices
Preceded by Martha Coakley	Democratic nominee for Governor of Massachusetts; 2018	Succeeded by Maura Healey
