= Frederick T. McDermott =

American politician (1906-2003)

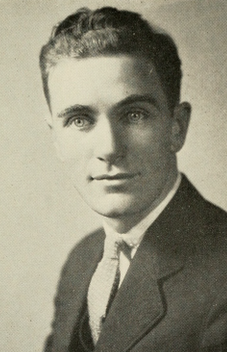

Member of the Massachusetts Senate for the 6th Middlesex District
- In office 1955–1959
- Preceded by: Robert P. Campbell
- Succeeded by: C. Eugene Farnam

Mayor of Medford, Massachusetts
- In office 1950–1951
- Preceded by: Walter E. Lawrence
- Succeeded by: John C. Carr Jr.

Personal details
- Born: November 20, 1906 Somerville, Massachusetts
- Died: February 24, 2003 (aged 96)
- Party: Democratic

Frederick T. McDermott (November 20, 1906 – February 24, 2003) was an American politician from Medford, Massachusetts.

== Early life ==
McDermott was born on November 20, 1906, in Somerville, Massachusetts. He was raised in Medford and graduated from Medford High School in 1925.

== Political career ==
McDermott was elected to the Medford school committee in 1931 and served for eight years. From 1935 to 1936 he was a member of the Massachusetts House of Representatives. He was the Democratic nominee for the United States House of Representatives seat in Massachusetts's 8th congressional district in 1942 and 1944, but lost to Angier Goodwin both times. He served on the Medford Board of Alderman and was elected to the city council when Medford's form of government change in 1949. As part of the change, the office of mayor change to a ceremonial position elected by the city council and McDermott's fellow councilors chose him to serve as the first mayor under the new setup. From 1955 to 1959, McDermott represented the 6th Middlesex District in the Massachusetts Senate. After leaving the Senate, McDermott was the assistant to the Massachusetts Registrar of Motor Vehicles. In 1961, he lost reelection to the Medford city council after controversially voting to appoint John C. Carr as city manager.
