= Francis Moorehouse =

American labor relations specialist (1923–1982)

Saugus, Massachusetts Town Manager
- In office 1970–1973
- Preceded by: Clarence Sayward Wilkinson
- Succeeded by: Robert C. Hagopian

Personal details
- Born: May 1, 1923 Pascoag, Rhode Island
- Died: March 17, 1982 (aged 58) Lynn, Massachusetts
- Resting place: Riverside Cemetery; Saugus Massachusetts
- Education: Lowell Institute; Mississippi State College
- Occupation: Labor relations specialist Town administrator

Francis C. "Skip" Moorehouse (May 1, 1923 - March 17, 1982) was an American labor relations specialist who worked for General Electric and served as Town Manager of Saugus, Massachusetts.

== Early life ==
Moorehouse was born in Pascoag, Rhode Island. He graduated from Saugus High School in 1941 and went on to attend Lowell Institute and Mississippi State College.

Moorehouse served in the United States Army during World War II. For 13 years, he was a member of the Massachusetts National Guard, where he retired as a captain.

== General Electric ==
Moorehouse worked for the General Electric plant in Lynn, Massachusetts, for 34 years. From 1953 to 1982 he was the manager of union relations, representing GE in union negotiations.

== Saugus Town Manager ==
In 1970, Moorehouse took a sabbatical from General Electric to serve as Town Manager of Saugus. He was the first Saugus resident to ever serve as full-time town manager. During his tenure he dealt with youth crime, attempted to have a $190 million oil refinery built in town, and succeeded in having Wheelabrator Technologies build their incineration plant, which would become the first commercially successful incineration plant in the United States, in Saugus. He is best remembered, however, for his proposal to bring sewers to Saugus.

In 1973, Moorehouse's sabbatical ended and he chose to return to General Electric rather than remain as town manager.

== Death ==
Moorehouse died on March 17, 1982, after a brief illness.
