= Town Manager of Saugus, Massachusetts =

Public office

The Town Manager of Saugus, Massachusetts, is the chief administrative manager of Saugus, Massachusetts. Saugus has a Town Manager/Representative town meeting (Plan E) system of government. The Town Manager’s Office is located in Saugus Town Hall. Scott Crabtree has been town manager since March 30, 2015 and previously held the position from 2012 to 2014.

Saugus has had more instability with the Manager's position compared to other towns. This high rate of turnover has been used by some opponents of the Town Manager form of government as an example of why their community should not adopt it.

== History ==
The Plan E form of government adopted following a referendum on June 2, 1947, in which the proposed form of government was supported 3,252 votes to 816. Saugus became the first town in Massachusetts to accept this form of government. The movement to adopt the Plan E form of government was led by Frederick Willis, Saugus' State Representative and the Speaker of the Massachusetts House of Representatives. C. F. Nelson Pratt led the opposition. The issue had been brought up two previous times. The first time it was approved by town meeting, but rejected by the voters. The second time it was approved by town meeting, but the vote was brought up for reconsideration and then blocked by parliamentary procedure.

In addition to creating the office of Town Manager, the Plan E form of government also expanded the Board of Selectmen from three members to five and changed the electoral system to Single transferable vote. Also, the offices of tax collector and tree warden switched from being elected positions to appointed positions. STV was abandoned after the 1950 election.

On February 15, 1948, the Board of Selectmen unanimously selected James Shurtleff, who had been recommended by the International City Managers Association, to serve as the first town manager of Saugus, Massachusetts. He took office on April 1. His salary was $8,000 a year.

== Appointment ==
The Town Manager is appointed by a four-fifths vote of the Board of Selectmen for a term of years determined by the board. The Town Charter requires that the Manager be

1. "Especially fitted by education, training and experience to perform the duties of the office"
2. "Be appointed without regard to his political beliefs".
3. "Need not be a resident of the town or the Commonwealth"

The town manager shall be sworn in by the Chairman of the Board of Selectmen, the Town Clerk, or a justice of the peace.

When the position becomes vacant, the Selectmen shall fill the office as soon as possible by appointing a temporary Manager. During a temporary absence or disability, the town manager may designate a qualified officer of the town to perform his duties. If the Manager does not make such designation, the Selectmen shall designate an officer of the town to perform the duties of the manager until he returns to office.

== Removal ==
The Selectmen may remove the town manager by a four-fifths vote. At least thirty days before a proposed removal, the selectmen must file a preliminary written resolution with the Town Clerk detailing the specific reasons for his proposed removal. The manager may reply in writing to the resolution and request a public hearing. After full consideration, the selectmen may adopt a final resolution of removal by a majority vote of the full membership of the board. The selectmen may suspend the manager from duty in the preliminary resolution, but shall pay him any unpaid balance of his salary and his salary for the next three calendar months.

== Duties and powers ==
The Town Manager shall supervise and direct the administration of all departments, commissions, boards and offices, except for the Board of Selectmen, School Committee, Board of Appeals, Board of Library Trustees, election officers, and the registrars of voters. He may reorganize, consolidate or abolish departments, commissions, boards, or offices under his control, establish new ones as he deems necessary, and may transfer the duties, powers and appropriation of one department, commission, board or office to another. He is in charge of fixing the compensation of all town officers and employees under his control. He can dismiss any officer or employee of the town, except for employees of the school department.

The Town Manager shall attend all regular meetings of the Board of Selectmen, except for meetings at which his removal is being considered.

He has jurisdiction over the rental and use of all town property and is responsible for the maintenance, repair, and construction of all town buildings.

The Town Manager is responsible for purchasing all supplies, materials, equipment (except schools books), and for awarding contracts for all town departments.

The Town Manager is directly or indirectly responsible for administering all of the town's general and special laws as well as all by-laws and regulations established by the Selectmen.

The Town Manager has authority to prosecute, defend, and compromise all litigation to which the town is a party. He can employ special counsel to assist the town counsel whenever he deems it to be necessary.

The Town Manager shall perform any other duties, consistent with his office, that the Board of Selectmen may assign to him.

The Town Manager may without notice investigate the affairs of any division, department, officer, or employee under his control.

The Town Manager is responsible for appointing members to the Planning Board, Board of Public Welfare, Board of Health, Board of Youth and Recreation Commissioners, Board of Cemetery Commissioners, Board of Assessors, as well as the Fire Chief, Town Clerk, Town Treasurer, Town Collector, Town Accountant, Superintendent of Public Works, Tree Warden, and Town Counsel. All of these appointments must be approved by a majority of the full board of selectmen at an open session. The Manager may also assume the duties of any office which he is authorized to fill by appointment.

The town manager is the chief fiscal officer of the town. Warrants for the payment of town funds must be approved by town manager. The town manager must submit an annual budget to the Board of Selectmen. He is also responsible for writing estimates of the probable expenditures of the town government, statements showing the town's expenditures, and statements showing all the revenue collected by the town. He shall report the probable amount to be levied and raised by taxation to cover all expenses and liabilities of the town and provide an estimate of the tax rate.

== List of Town Managers ==
Town Manager	Term
James Shurtleff	1948–1950
Patrick Cusick (temporary)	1950–1950
Carl A. Chapman (temporary)	1950–1950
Norman G. Young	1950–1952
Delmont Goding (temporary)	1952–1952
Walter E. Lawrence	1952–1956
Charles C. DeFronzo (temporary)	1956–1956
Daniel E. McLean	1956–1958
Arthur Gustafson, Sr. (temporary)	1958–1958
John B. Kennedy	1958–1961
Bradbury Gilbert (temporary)	1961–1962
John O. Stinson (temporary)	1962–1962
John O. Stinson	1962–1967
Stanley Warren Day (temporary)	1967–1967
Paul H. Boucher	1967–1968
Graham Churchard (temporary)	1968–1968
Irving Campbell (temporary)	1968–1968
Clarence Sayward Wilkinson	1968–1970
Francis Moorehouse	1970–1973
Norman Hansen (temporary)	1973–1974
Robert C. Hagopian	1974–1974
Maurice Cunningham	1974–1976
Richard Olle (temporary)	1976–1976
George O. Gregson	1976–1978
Norman Hansen (temporary)	1977–1978
Thomas E. Duff	1978–1980
Robert Cornetta (temporary)	1980–1980
Robert Cornetta	1980–1981
Norman Hansen (temporary)	1981–1981
Paul Rabchenuk	1981–1987
Norman Hansen (temporary)	1987–1987
Norman Hansen	1987–1992
Edward J. Collins, Jr.	1992–1996
Richard Cardillo (temporary)	1996–1996
Richard Cardillo	1996–1998
Steven Angelo (temporary)	1998–1998
Steven Angelo	1998–2002
John Vasapolli (temporary)	2002–2003
Andrew Bisignani	2003–2012
John Vasapolli (temporary)	2012–2012
Scott Crabtree	2012–2014
Michael Murphy (acting)	2014–2014
Robert Palleschi (temporary)	2014–2015
Sean Fitzgerald	^{1}
Scott Crabtree	2015–present

== Notes ==
1. Fitzgerald signed a contract and was sworn in as Town Manager, but his contract was voided before he took office.
