= John O. Stinson =

American civil engineer and town administrator

Hanover, New Hampshire Town Manager
- In office 1974–1977

Ipswich, Massachusetts Town Manager
- In office 1967–1969

Saugus, Massachusetts Town Manager
- In office 1962–1967
- Preceded by: John B. Kennedy
- Succeeded by: Paul H. Boucher

Personal details
- Education: Worcester Polytechnic Institute
- Occupation: Civil Engineer; Hospital Administrator; Town Manager

John O. Stinson (died September 3, 2021) was an American civil engineer and town administrator who served as Town Manager of Saugus, Massachusetts, Ipswich, Massachusetts, and Hanover, New Hampshire.

== Early life and career ==
Born and raised in Acton, Massachusetts, Stinson served in the United States Armed Forces during the Korean War. He then attended Worcester Polytechnic Institute, where he received a B.S. in civil engineering in 1957.

Stinson then worked for Boston engineering firm of Metcalf and Eddy. In 1961, while working on the Wachusett Dam, he was seriously injured after he fell off of a 60-foot ledge. He then crawled 250 feet for help.

== Saugus Town Manager ==
On February 19, 1962, Stinson was appointed Town Manager of Saugus, Massachusetts by the Saugus Board of Selectmen. He was chosen out of a field of 35 applicants, with three members voting for him and two voting for Clarence Sayward Wilkinson. His appointment was on a six-month temporary basis, but the board would later give him the job permanently.

During his tenure as town manager, Saugus opened two new elementary schools; the Oaklandvale School and the Lynnhurst School. Stinson also had to deal with the loss of 35 classrooms due to 3 arson fires. He and school superintendent Rhoden B. Eddy addressed the loss of classrooms by having seventh and eighth grade attend class in the Veterans' Memorial Elementary School and the American Legion Hall and having ninth graders attend class in the afternoon. They were also able to repair the east wing of the Saugus High School in time for the 1964–65 school year. A new junior high school and elementary school were also constructed.

The Laurel Gardens elderly housing complex was also constructed during Stinson's tenure.

While Stinson was manager, Saugus' image improved due to his stable leadership and town meeting's willingness to increase expenditures to allow for improvements to the town's schools, highways, and water and sewer lines. The town's population also grew rapidly during this period, which town officials contended was due to Saugus becoming more attractive to prospective homeowners. Additionally, many new businesses opened on Route 1. However, the Board of Selectmen objected to Stinson's spending increases. This dispute came to a head when the cost of constructing the new junior high school unexpectedly increased. On March 7, 1967, Selectman Frederick Wagner introduced a motion to fire Stinson, citing the town's "sky-rocketing tax rate" and Stinson's "cool indifference" to the Board of Selectmen. The board voted 4 to 0 to suspend and fire Stinson, with the town manager's only supporter on the board, Vernon W. Evans, unable to attend the meeting due to illness. His dismissal came one day after a number of supporters held a public reception honoring him for being the town's longest serving manager.

Following Stinson's dismissal, over 4,000 residents signed a petition in support of him. His supporters also led a recall effort against the Selectmen who voted for his dismissal. The firing did not become official as the Board of Selectmen did not vote on a final resolution of removal and Stinson was allowed to return to work. However, on May 22, 1967, Stinson announced his resignation, stating that board's vote to fire him was "personally and professionally degrading to the point where in most absolute manner I refuse to be connected with the board in any manner and hearby resign".

== Ipswich and Hanover ==
On June 2, 1967, Stinson accepted the position of Ipswich Town Manager. He was the town's first permanent manager after a new charter was approved in March. During his tenure in Ipswich, he investigated the feasibility of constructing a nuclear power plant in the town.

After leaving Ipswich, Stinson worked as an administrator at the Berkshire Medical Center.

From 1974 to 1977, Stinson was Town Manager of Hanover, New Hampshire. During his tenure, Stinson successfully lobbied Governor Meldrim Thomson, Jr. and the Executive Council of New Hampshire for funding for subsidized housing in the Hanover area.

Stinson resigned as Town Manager on July 1, 1977. Following his resignation, Stinson remained in the Hanover area in a business capacity.

== Personal life ==
Stinson married Barbara Ann Mayr on September 22, 1956, with whom he had three sons and three daughters. Barbara Ann died in 2016.
