= James Shurtleff =

American politician and journalist (1910-1964)

City Manager of Medford, Massachusetts
- In office 1950–1956
- Preceded by: Office created
- Succeeded by: John B. Kennedy

Town Manager of Saugus, Massachusetts
- In office 1948–1950
- Preceded by: Office created
- Succeeded by: Patrick Cusick (temporary)

Village Manager of Brookfield, Illinois
- In office 1947–1948
- Succeeded by: C. Harold Eash

Town Manager of Mansfield, Massachusetts
- In office 1943–1947

Personal details
- Born: July 28, 1910 Middleborough, Massachusetts
- Died: November 18, 1964 (aged 54) Medford, Massachusetts
- Spouse: Thalia Elizabeth (Forsberg) Shurtleff
- Profession: Journalist; City Manager

James Frederick Shurtleff (July 28, 1910–November 18, 1964) was an American journalist, politician, and city manager.

== Early life ==
Shurtleff was born on July 28, 1910, in Middleborough, Massachusetts. He attended Williston Academy and Brown University.

Shurtleff worked as a writer for the Middleborough Journal and The Standard-Times. In 1937, while working for the Journal, Shurtleff was elected to the Middleborough Board of Selectmen.

On August 12, 1938, Shurtleff married Thalia Elizabeth Forsberg. They would go on to have four children together.

During World War II, Shurtleff served as one of Middleborough's three blackout coordinators.

== Mansfield, Massachusetts ==
In 1943, Shurtleff, who had no prior experience in the day-to-day administrative operations of a town, was named Town Manager of Mansfield, Massachusetts.

In 1945, Shurtleff dismissed Police Chief John Haines and named Lawrence Barrows to succeed him. Haines refused to turn over his badge and the keys to the police cruiser and maintained that he was still chief. Two months later, a Special Town Meeting voted to direct the Board of Selectmen to reinstate Haines as Chief. Shurtleff, who accused Haines of 35 counts of misconduct, including fee splitting and insubordination, refused to reinstate the former chief. The dismissal was upheld by the Massachusetts Supreme Judicial Court and the Civil Service Commission.

== Brookfield, Illinois ==
In August 1947, Shurtleff was named village manager of Brookfield, Illinois. Shurtleff left Brookfield after only eight months to become Town Manager in Saugus, Massachusetts.

== Saugus, Massachusetts ==
On February 16, 1948, Shurtleff was unanimously chosen by the Board of Selectmen to become the first Town Manager of Saugus. On February 1, 1950, Shurtleff resigned as Town Manager to accept a similar job in Medford, Massachusetts.

== Medford, Massachusetts ==
In 1950, Shurtleff became Medford's first-ever City Manager.

During his tenure in Medford, Shurtleff clashed with State Tax Commissioner Henry F. Long over who could appoint assessors. The dispute went before the Massachusetts Supreme Judicial Court, who ruled in favor of Shurtleff.

On November 20, 1956, the Medford City Council voted 4 to 3 in favor of firing Shurtleff. After his dismissal, Shurtleff was granted a public hearing a second vote on whether or not he should be fired. Once again, the City Council voted in favor of dismissal.

In 1957, Shurtleff ran for and was elected to the Medford City Council. Soon after his election, Shurtleff led the charge to remove his successor as City Manager, John B. Kennedy, from office. On April 8, 1958, the city council voted for to 4 to 3 to fire Kennedy. Shurtleff was later involved in the effort to remove City Manager John C. Carr, charging that City Councilor John C. Carr, Jr.'s vote for his father was a conflict of interest.

On November 18, 1964, Shurtleff died at his home of a heart attack.
