= Saugus General Hospital =

Geography
- Location: 81 Chestnut Street, Saugus, Massachusetts, United States
- Coordinates: 42.456665°N 70.991542°W

Organization
- Funding: Private
- Type: General

Services
- Beds: 26 (opening); 142 (peak); 109 (closure)

History
- Opened: 1946
- Closed: 1978

Links
- Lists: Hospitals in Massachusetts

Saugus General Hospital (previously known as Wendell Hospital) was a hospital located in Saugus, Massachusetts. At the time of its closure, Saugus General Hospital was a 109-bed facility with surgical facilities, x-ray rooms, a laboratory, a pharmacy, and a cafeteria located in two interconnected buildings.

== History ==
Saugus General Hospital was founded in 1946 as a 26-bed surgical center. In 1961 a major addition was constructed, which raised capacity to 142 beds, including 20 bassinets for newborns. On February 3, 1964, a fire was started in the hospital's basement. The fire resulted in $2000 in damages and the relocation of 96 patients. It was the sixth in a series of arsons in town that included fires in three schools and one church. However, the Saugus youth who admitted to starting the other five fires denied starting the blaze at Saugus General Hospital.

In 1975, the maternity ward was closed due to a decline in birth rates. In 1976, the Public Health Department reported over 100 deficiencies following an inspection of the hospital. In 1977, the hospital reported $130,000 in losses.

On July 20, 1978, Saugus Bank gave Saugus General Hospital a notice of intention to foreclose. The following month the Bank filed a Petition for Authority to Foreclose in Essex County Superior Court. On August 26, 1978, the hospital's board of directors voted to phase out the hospital due to financial problems. On August 30, the Public Health Department asked the hospital not to admit any new patients, perform any non-emergency surgeries, and discontinue emergency operations due to numerous deficiencies, including deficiencies in the hospital's nursing care. On September 1, the hospital filed for bankruptcy. On September 8, the hospital closed. On January 24, 1980 an auction was held to sell the building and its equipment. The property was sold to HMS Fund Inc. for $9,000 (plus $116,000 in tax and water liens) at a public auction. After the hospital's closure, area residents nearest hospitals were Melrose-Wakefield Hospital, Lynn General Hospital (since closed), and Union Hospital. HMS planned to refurbish the building and turn it into a 60-bed "limited hospital".
