= Saugus Town Hall =

- U.S. National Register of Historic Places
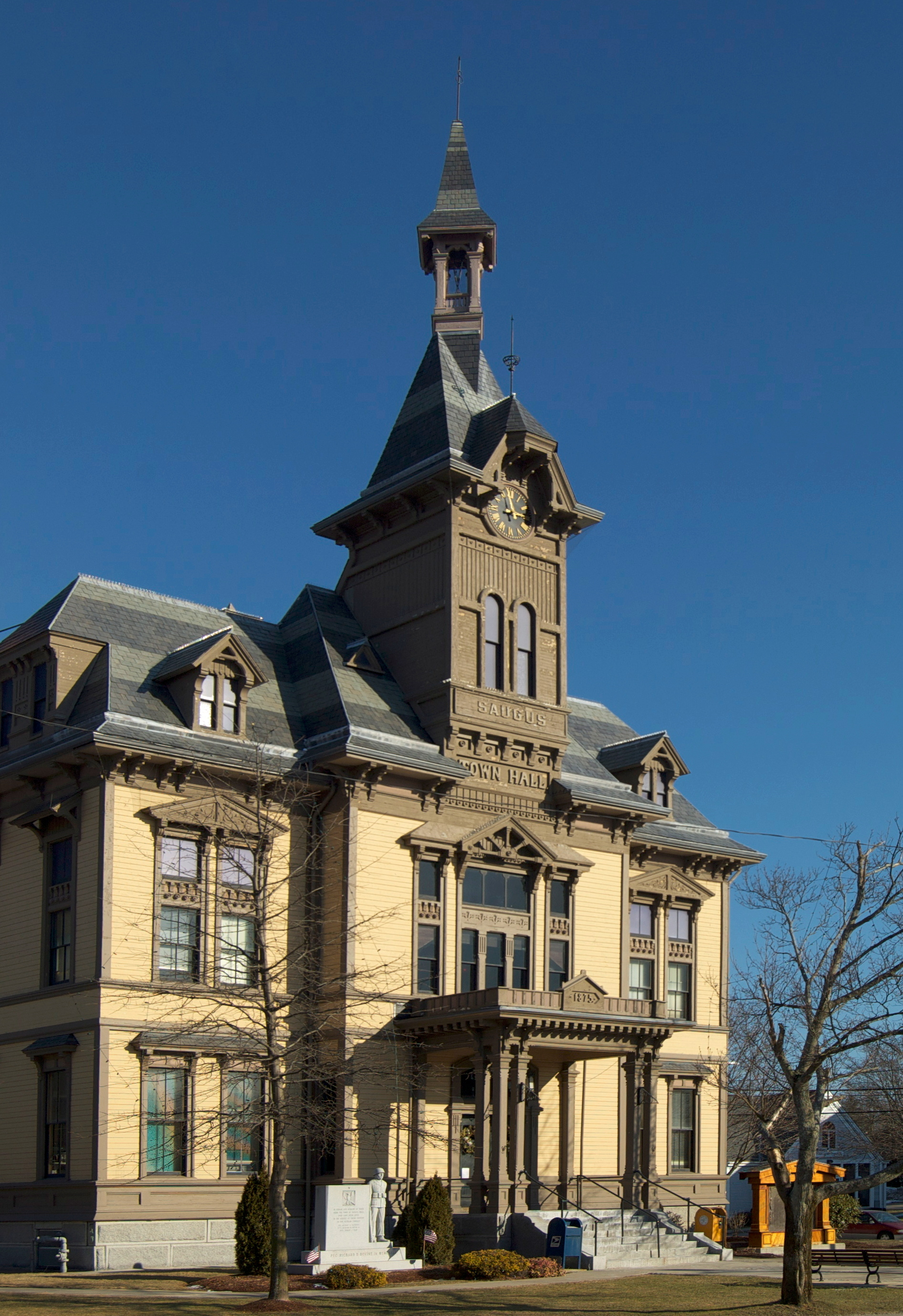
- Saugus Town Hall

- Location within Massachusetts Location within the United States
- Location: 298 Central St., Saugus, Massachusetts
- Coordinates: 42°27′54″N 71°0′35″W
- Built: 1874–1877
- Architect: Lord & Fuller
- Architectural style: Gothic
- NRHP reference No.: 85001332
- Added to NRHP: June 20, 1985

Saugus Town Hall is a historic town hall in Saugus, Massachusetts. It was built in 1875 and added to the National Register of Historic Places in 1985.

== Construction ==
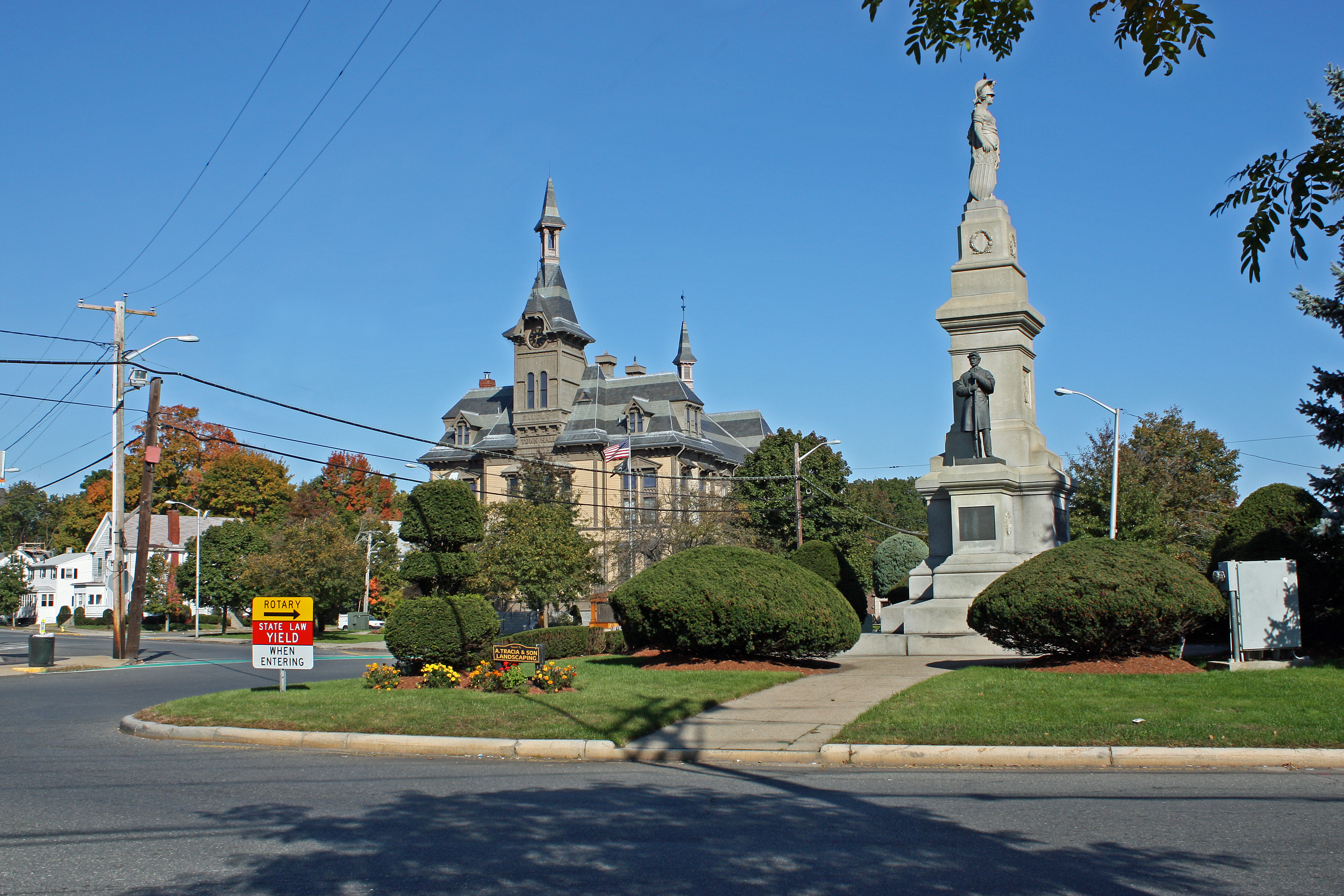
Saugus Center and Town Hall

In 1874, construction began on Saugus' second and present town hall. The cornerstone was laid on October 17, 1874. The day's exercises began with a procession from Sutton Hall up Chestnut Street, through Winter and Central Streets, up Main Street, through Summer Street, down Pleasant Street, and down Central Street to the site of the Town Hall. The Rev. Mr. Allen delivered an invocation and then the stone was laid by members of the Grand Lodge of Massachusetts. The East Saugus Brass Band provided music. Harmon Hall then made the introductory remarks. Nathaniel P. Banks followed with an oration. Wilbur F. Newhall made the closing remarks. The exercises ended with a benediction by Rev. F. V. Tenney.

Saugus Town Hall was built on a low, wet piece of land purchased from Samuel A. Parker. The land was filled at great expense and construction of the town hall put Saugus in a $50,000 debt. This was one of the reasons that the neighborhood of East Saugus sought to be set off from Saugus and annexed to the city of Lynn. East Saugus was unable to get a bill in both houses of the state legislature, and the issue was dropped after the town appropriated $5,000 for the laying of water pipes through East Saugus.

The building was officially dedicated on March 1, 1877. It was attended by residents from Saugus as well as from surrounding communities. Seated on the stage were dignitaries from Saugus and Lynn, including the Saugus Board of Selectmen, Lynn mayor Samuel M. Bubier, and former Lynn mayors James N. Buffum and Hiram N. Breed. The dedicatory address was given by Wendell Phillips. Mayor Buffum then made a speech and was followed by Building Committee Chairman E. P. Robinson, who made a brief speech followed by a formal handing over of the building's keys to Board of Selectmen Chairman E. W. Newhall, who also spoke. The hymn Old 100th was then sung and Rev. Samuel Jackson ended the ceremony with a benediction.

== Layout ==
The first floor originally housed the selectmen, town clerk, and town treasurer's offices, as well as the school committee room, a high school classroom, and the public library. The high school and library have since moved to their own buildings and the school committee room is now located in the School Administration Building. The second story originally served as a community room that hosted a number of events including town meetings, political rallies, high school graduations, plays, boxing matches, puppet shows, firemen's balls, banquets, and school dances. It was later divided into offices for the accounting, financing, public works and personnel/purchasing departments. When the Town Hall was renovated in 1997, the second floor once again became an assembly room. The basement housed the town's police department and jail until a police station was constructed in 1936.

== Notable events ==
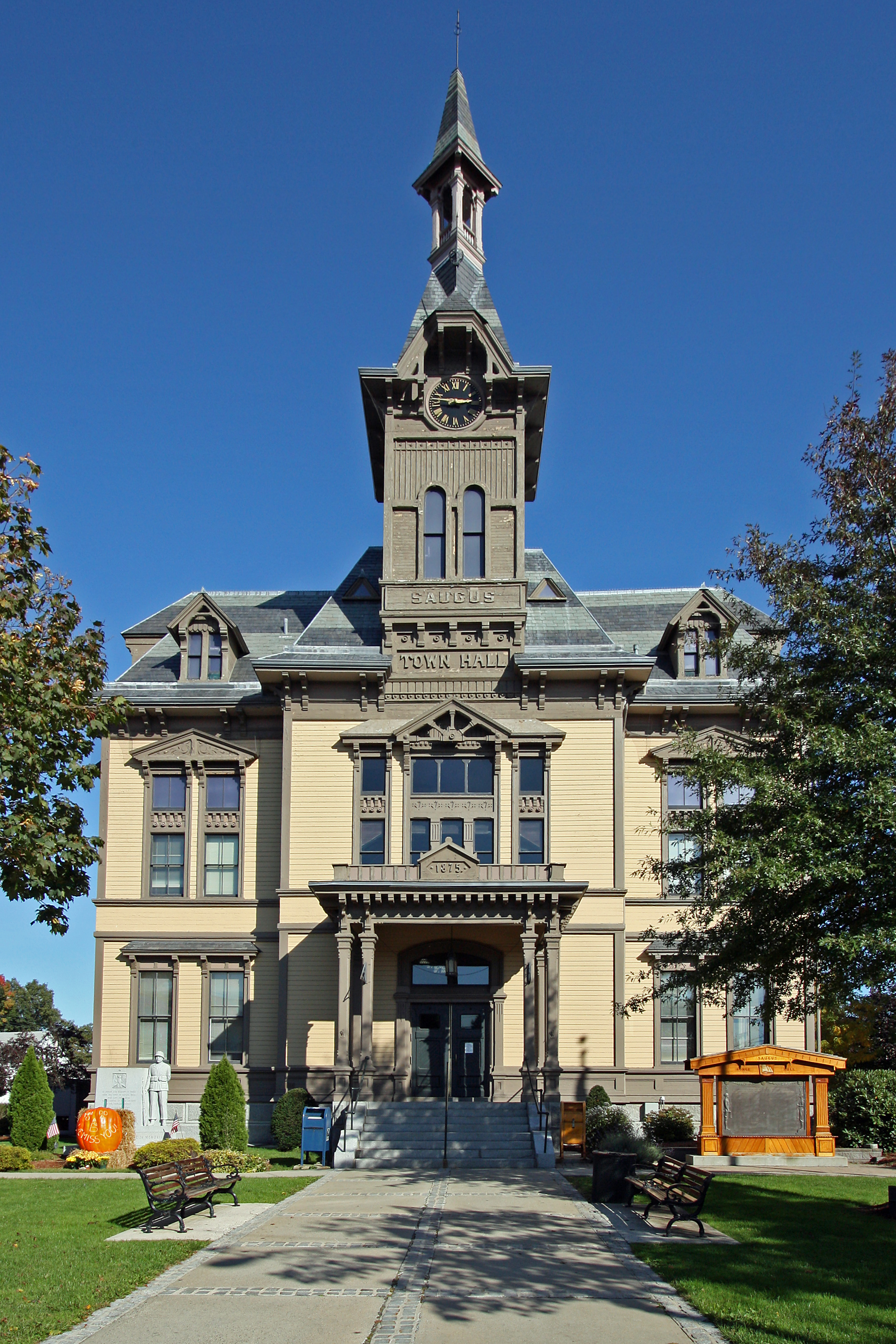
Saugus Town Hall front view

On March 14, 1892, town collector William F. Hitchings died during the Annual Town Meeting. He was distributing copies of a circular addressing an inaccuracy he had made when he suddenly died.

In 1922, Private Winslow Hodgson lay in state after his body was returned from burial in France. The local American Legion post wanted to hold the lying in state on a date the conflicted with a dance held by the Saugus Canoe and Tennis Club. The club chose not to postpone its dance, citing short notice and the great expense that had gone into the event. Members of the Legion stood outside of the dance with a banner that read "Enjoy Yourselves Dancing While The Body Of A Dead Soldier Lies In The Morgue".

On October 31, 1927, a fire in the basement of the town hall caused $5000 in damages. The fire started in the cell room of the police headquarters and ate through the floors and partitions of the building. Police officers and firemen were able to save the town's irreplaceable documents, books, and articles.

In 1929, Gwladys Sutherst Townshend, mayor of King's Lynn, visited Saugus Town Hall on her visit to the town. The Marchioness, who was visiting the area as part of Lynn, Massachusetts' tercentenary celebration, also visited the Boardman House and the Saugus Iron Works while in Saugus.

From August 26 to August 28, 1932, the body of John Burke, a soldier killed in Tientsin, China was laid in state at the town hall.

From December 8 to 11, 1947, the body of Staff Sergeant Arthur F. DeFranzo was laid in state at the town hall. DeFranzo was later awarded the Medal of Honor for his actions.

In 1975, $30,000 in municipal funds (about $19,000 in cash and $11,000 in checks) were stolen from a vault the Collector–Treasurer's office. The theft occurred two weeks after a set of keys was taken from a custodian who had left them in a ladies room door. Town Manager Maurice Cunningham could not explain why the money had not been deposited in a local bank as it usually was.

== Renovation ==
In 1976, the building underwent renovation. The rear portion of the building was reconditioned and aluminium siding was installed. In 1977, the building was painted and the broken slate tiles on the roof were replaced.

By the 1990s the town hall had fallen into disrepair and the town proposed tearing it down. However, the Saugus Historical Commission pushed to save and restore the building. The town's Capital Improvement Plan included funding for its renovation. In 1998, The Friends of Town Hall was formed to raise money to complete several projects not covered by the plan. This included the purchase of a piano for functions in the town hall auditorium, installation of display cases exhibiting historic items on the first floor, and the dedication of "The Founding of Saugus Mural" in the Town Hall auditorium. The town hall was closed during the renovations and the offices were moved to the former high school extension building on Main Street.

A reopening ceremony was held on November 17, 1998. Board of Selectmen chairman Janette Fasano served as the master of ceremonies and delivered the opening and closing remarks. Father John Mulloy delivered the invocation. Town Manager Steven Angelo, former town manager Richard Cardillo, Secretary of the Commonwealth William F. Galvin, Historical Commission chairman Stephen Carlson, United States Representative John F. Tierney, Massachusetts Senate President Tom Birmingham, and State Senator Edward J. Clancy, Jr. spoke. Selectmen Richard Barry, Jon Bernard, Chris Ciampa, and Anthony Cogliano also made remarks. Reverend Gregg Messerole delivered the benediction.

In total, the renovations cost $3.5 million.

== See also ==
- National Register of Historic Places listings in Essex County, Massachusetts
