= Robert Cornetta =

American judge

Saugus, Massachusetts Town Manager
- In office 1980–1981
- Preceded by: Thomas E. Duff
- Succeeded by: Paul Rabchenuk

Personal details
- Born: 1951 (age 74–75) Winthrop, Massachusetts
- Education: Suffolk University; Suffolk University Law School
- Occupation: Attorney; Government official Judge; College professor=

Robert A. Cornetta is an American jurist who currently serves as a Lawrence Superior Court judge and is an adjunct professor at the Massachusetts School of Law at Andover.

== Early life ==
Cornetta was born in 1951 in Winthrop, Massachusetts. He graduated with honors from Suffolk University (1972) and Suffolk University Law School (1976).

== Government work ==
In 1978, Cornetta served as an assistant district attorney in Essex County, Massachusetts. He then served as town clerk of Saugus, Massachusetts. On March 28, 1980, Cornetta was named temporary town manager. From 1980 to 1981 he was the town manager. He then served as an assistant commissioner and director of the Division of Hearings in the Department of Public Welfare from 1981 to 1983.

In 1983 he was an unsuccessful candidate for the Saugus Board of Selectmen.

From 1983 to 1992, Cornetta ran a private law practice.

== Judicial career ==
In 1992, Cornetta was appointed Associate Justice of the Ipswich District Court by Governor William Weld. In 1997 he was named that court's Presiding Justice. In 1998 he was named Presiding Justice of the Salem District Court and Regional Administrative Justice for Region II.

=== Notable cases ===
- City Bank of South Dakota vs. DeChristoforo. Declaring unconscionable and therefore unenforceable high credit card interest rates
- 15 Gloucester Parents vs. Gloucester Community Arts Charter School. Upholding school's operation in the city of Gloucester, Massachusetts
- Griess vs. Talx Corporation
- Bill Hudak's libel suit against Congressional opponent John F. Tierney
- Lawrence, Massachusetts Public Works Director Frank McCann's lawsuit against the city and former Mayors Kevin and Michael Sullivan
- Commonwealth of Massachusetts vs. Dooling. Enforcing animal cruelty and neglect charges
- Mills vs. AMC Theatres Slip and fall cases in darkened movie theatres are governed by the modern liability theory of "mode of operation", not by traditional negligence law
