= Clarence Wilkinson =

American politician (1910-1996)

Boothbay Harbor, Maine Town Manager
- In office 1970–1975

Saugus, Massachusetts Town Manager
- In office 1968–1970
- Preceded by: Paul H. Boucher
- Succeeded by: Francis Moorehouse

Member of the Massachusetts House of Representatives from the 15th Essex District
- In office 1957–1961
- Preceded by: Herbert Tuckerman
- Succeeded by: George L. Allen

Mayor of Beverly, Massachusetts
- In office 1951–1957
- Preceded by: Robert J. Rafferty
- Succeeded by: Thomas J. Wickers, Jr.

Personal details
- Born: September 26, 1910 Gloucester, Massachusetts
- Died: July 12, 1996 (aged 85) Bremen, Maine
- Party: Republican
- Occupation: Contractor; City Administrator; Politician

Clarence Sayward Wilkinson (born September 26, 1910 – July 12, 1996) was an American politician who served as Mayor of Beverly, Massachusetts, from 1951 to 1957, State Representative from 1957 to 1961, Town Manager of Saugus from 1968 to 1970, and Town Manager of Boothbay Harbor, Maine, from 1970 to 1975.

== Career ==
Wilkinson was born in Gloucester, Massachusetts. He was elected Mayor of Beverly, Massachusetts in 1950 and re-elected in 1952, 1954, and 1956. During his tenure as Mayor, Beverly celebrated its 325th anniversary, hosted World Heavyweight Boxing Champion Rocky Marciano, hosted two Sports Car Club of America auto racing events, and built two new schools. Prior to becoming Mayor, Wilkinson spent four years as a member of the Beverly Board of Aldermen.

In 1953, Wilkinson was a candidate for State Representative, but lost in the Republican primary to Herbert Tuckerman.

In 1955, Wilkinson received a type-written letter containing a threat to kill him if he did not pay four million dollars. An investigation by Beverly police revealed that the letter was written by a fourteen-year-old boy at a junior high school.

Wilkinson was elected State Representative in 1956. He served as State Representative and Mayor simultaneously during his final year as Mayor. He was reelected in 1958, but lost the 1960 Republican primary to George L. Allen.

In 1962, Wilkinson was named Associate State Commissioner of Public Works.

In 1965, he made a return to elected office in Beverly as a member of the Board of Aldermen. In 1966, the town offered 207 acres of land abutting Beverly Municipal Airport to Boeing in attempt to convince them to build a proposed multimillion-dollar plant in Beverly. Wilkinson served as the town's liaison officer in the ultimately unsuccessful project. In 1967, Wilkinson ran again for Mayor, but finished third in the primary behind James A. Vitale and Herbert Grimes.

On October 14, 1968, he was named Town Manager of Saugus, Massachusetts. He had previously been a finalist for the job in 1962, but the Board of Selectmen decided to give the job to John O. Stinson. He resigned in 1970 to take the same position in Boothbay Harbor, Maine. He remained as Boothbay Harbor's Town Manager until his retirement in 1975.

He died on July 12, 1996, in Bremen, Maine.
