= Paul H. Boucher =

American city manager (1931-2003)

Village Manager of Maywood, Illinois
- In office 1970–1970

Village Manager of Ellenville, New York
- In office 1968–1969

Town Manager of Saugus, Massachusetts
- In office 1967–1968
- Preceded by: John O. Stinson
- Succeeded by: Clarence Wilkinson

Personal details
- Born: January 9, 1931
- Died: March 24, 2003 (aged 72)
- Education: University of Wyoming

Paul H. Boucher (January 9, 1931 – March 24, 2003) was an American city manager who served as town manager of Saugus, Massachusetts, and village manager of Ellenville, New York, and Maywood, Illinois.

== Early life and career ==
Boucher graduated from the University of Wyoming with a degree in public administration. After interning in the state of Illinois, Boucher was a schoolteacher in Wyoming and Louisiana and ran an economic consulting business in Littleton, Colorado that specialized in local government.

== Buffalo, New York ==
In December 1966, Boucher was appointed by Mayor Frank A. Sedita to serve as executive director of the Citizens Advisory Committee for Community Development in Buffalo, New York. Boucher's primary duty was to conduct a preliminary management survey to improve the efficiency of city government. On March 15, 1967 he reported that 1,400 to 1,600 jobs could be cut from the city payroll. His statement upset many high-ranking Democrats, including Mayor Sedita. After the statement, Boucher was described as "walking on eggshells" and being a "marked man" at City Hall. Boucher resigned in August 1967 after his management survey was completed.

== Saugus Town Manager ==
On July 31, 1967, Boucher was chosen by the Saugus Board of Selectmen to serve as Town Manager on a six-month trial basis.

During his tenure as manager, the town fought the state government to close the M. DeMatteo dump on Massachusetts Route 107. After the town declined a request by State Health Commissioner Alfred Frechette to keep the dump open, Governor John A. Volpe signed an emergency order that would reopen the dump. The town refused to comply with this order and the dump was not reopened until the state Department of Public Health was granted temporary restraining order by the Suffolk Superior Court. The state agreed to shut down the facility by December 1, 1967, however the dump remained open pass this deadline and the issue was once again brought before the courts.

Boucher was also involved in a controversy over the new Saugus Junior High School. On October 4, 1967, he announced that he was launching an investigation into defects in the construction of the school. He later alleged that $200,000 in funds might have been misused and that he wanted the Federal Bureau of Investigation to investigate if it had jurisdiction. Boucher met with an FBI agent on October 17 to turn over documents relating to alleged misuse of federal funds spent on equipment for the school.

In November 1967, Boucher was hospitalized after a recurrence of a respiratory ailment.

On February 20, 1968, the Board of Selectmen voted unanimously not to renew Boucher's six-month contract.

== Ellenville Village Manager ==
On November 16, 1968, Boucher was appointed Village Manager of Ellenville, New York. Upon taking office, Boucher formulated a ten-point "program of progress", which consisted of centralizing purchasing, updating equipment and work methods, improving snow removal, implementing new budget procedures, hiring professional leadership for the street department, and creating programs for street renewal, narcotics control, youth, tree replacement, and the development of Mount Cathalia as a recreational facility. Of his ten points, Boucher was able to implement the first five, which he said resulted in "countless tax savings" for the people of Ellenville.

In July 1969, Ellenville Trustee Rivan Krieger moved to remove Boucher from office after Boucher signed a check (worth $11.63) that should've gone to the New York State Employee's Retirement Fund over to himself. He was later accused of having falsely claimed be a graduate of two colleges. In August 1969, Boucher resigned, citing "political pressure" and his "deteriorating" relationship with the Ellenville Board of Trustees.

== Maywood Village Manager ==
In March 1970, Boucher was named Village Manager of Maywood, Illinois. On May 6, 1970 he was arrested and charged with theft by deception, improper use of license plates, and failure to register a vehicle in Illinois. Boucher was accused of using the same camper truck as collateral for two loans, failing to register in the state of Illinois a 1970 Cadillac he purchased in Louisiana, and using New York plates issued to a different car on his Cadillac. On May 15, the village board voted to suspend him indefinitely without pay pending an investigation. The investigation found "gross irregularities in his application for employment". Boucher had falsely claimed to have earned bachelor's and master's degrees in public administration from Northwestern University. He had also claimed to have served as city manager of Juneau, Alaska from 1958 to 1960, when he had actually been teaching. On May 28 the board voted to fire him.

On April 26, 1971, he pleaded guilty to theft of property under $150. Boucher admitted to securing a $2,500 loan from the Maywood Employees Credit Union and pledging the title of a camper truck as collateral. Although the agreement for this loan stated that the title was unencumbered, there was in fact an outstanding lien.

On May 15, 1971, he was sentenced to three years probation and order to repay the $2,500 and $300 interest at the rate of $200 a month.

In August 1971, Boucher's probation was revoked after he failed make any of his scheduled payments to the credit union. At his revocation hearing, Boucher testified that he was unable to secure employment and that his main sources of income were a welfare stipend of $256 a month, which he sent to his brother, who was caring of his children, and unemployment benefits of $74 a week which he used to pay his rent and to care for his wife, who was in an institution. He was sentenced to one year in Cook County Jail. Boucher appealed the order revoking his probation to the Illinois Appellate Court on the grounds that his rights under the Illinois and United States Constitutions were violated because his imprisonment would be "tantamount to imprisonment of an indigent for failure to pay a debt". The appellate court affirmed the Circuit Court of Cook County's decision on March 14, 1973. The Supreme Court of Illinois granted leave to appeal and on May 20, 1974, vacated the appellate court's decision.

== Personal life ==
Boucher was married to Betty Boucher. They had three children. While they were in Saugus, Betty Boucher pushed for the creation of a town theater company. At her urging the Saugus Towncriers, now known as the Theatre Company of Saugus, was founded.

Boucher's hobbies included collecting rare books, listening to classical music, photography, fossil hunting, skiing, hiking, and sailing.
