= List of people from Saugus, Massachusetts =

Following are notable people who were either born, raised, or have lived for a significant period of time in Saugus, Massachusetts:

| Name | Description |
|---|---|
| Joseph Alexander Ames | Portrait artist |
| Nathan Ames | Inventor credited with patenting the first escalator in 1859 |
| Steven Angelo | State representative 1981–2001, House of Representatives chairman of Committee on Natural Resources and Government Regulations Committee; assistant majority leader; Saugus town manager 1998–2002 |
| Ben Arnold | Suffragan bishop of the Episcopal Diocese of Massachusetts |
| Stephen Bachiler | English clergyman; early proponent of the separation of church and state |
| Margaret Jewett Smith Bailey | Pioneer, missionary, and author |
| Jimmy Bannon | Major League Baseball player for the St. Louis Browns and Boston Beaneaters |
| Tom Bannon | Professional baseball player and manager |
| Frank P. Bennett | Journalist, magazine publisher and politician |
| Frank P. Bennett, Jr. | Politician, banker, and editor who served in the Massachusetts General Court |
| Janis M. Berry | Associate justice of the Massachusetts Appeals Court; 1994 Republican nominee for Massachusetts attorney general |
| Elizabeth Bishop | Poet, short-story writer; recipient of the 1976 Neustadt International Prize for Literature; Poet Laureate of the United States, 1949–1950; Pulitzer Prize winner for Poetry in 1956; National Book Award winner in 1970 |
| Belden Bly | Member of the Massachusetts House of Representatives, 1948–1979 |
| Wade Boggs | Former professional baseball player |
| Charles Henry Bond | Cigar manufacturer (Waitt & Bond), real estate investor, and art patron |
| Paul H. Boucher | Town manager of Saugus, Massachusetts (1967–1968); village manager of Maywood, Illinois (1970–1970) |
| Tom Brunansky | Former Major League Baseball right fielder |
| Wayne Budd | Former U.S. attorney for Massachusetts and United States associate attorney general |
| Abijah Cheever | Doctor and politician |
| Jonathan Cheever | Snowboarder |
| Joseph Cheever | Farmer and politician; Saugus' first town treasurer and state representative |
| Gerry Cheevers | Goaltender in the National Hockey League and World Hockey Association |
| Don Cherry | Former National Hockey League head coach; current Hockey Night in Canada analyst |
| Tracee Chimo | Actress |
| Lars Christiansen | Member of the New Hampshire House of Representatives |
| Edward J. Collins, Jr. | Deputy commissioner of the Massachusetts Department of Revenue (1978–1991); town manager of Saugus (1991–1996); chief financial officer and treasurer of Boston (1996–2002); advisor to mayor of Boston Thomas Menino (2002–2005); namesake of the Edward J. Collins, Jr. Center for Public Management at the University of Massachusetts Boston |
| Robert Cornetta | Town manager of Saugus (1980–1982), state court judge (1991–present) |
| Maurice Cunningham | Attorney, educator, and political figure; town manager of Saugus, 1974–1976 |
| John A. Curry | Former president of Northeastern University |
| Patrick Cusick | Civil engineer and city planner; served as executive director of the Pittsburgh Regional Planning Association, general manager of the Litchfield Park Land and Development Company, and president of the Greater Hartford Community Development Corporation |
| Arthur F. DeFranzo | U.S. Army soldier and Medal of Honor recipient in World War II |
| Gary Doak | Former National Hockey League defenceman |
| William Dodge | One of the most well-known rare and out of print book dealers in the Cincinnati area. |
| William Eustis | 12th governor of Massachusetts; resided part-time at his brother's home in Cliftondale |
| Vernon W. Evans | Politician and educator who served as a member of the Massachusetts House of Representatives, superintendent of the Saugus Public Schools, and a member of the Saugus Board of Selectmen |
| Ed Fallon | Member of the Iowa House of Representatives from the 66th district (1993–2006); candidate for governor of Iowa (2002) and US House of Representatives (2006) |
| Mark Falzone | Deputy director of the National Immigration Forum; member of the Massachusetts House of Representatives from the Ninth Essex District, 2001–2011 |
| Cornelius Conway Felton | Regent of the Smithsonian Institution; president of Harvard University |
| John B. Felton | Mayor of Oakland, California (1869–1871), namesake of Felton, California |
| Samuel Morse Felton, Sr. | Railroad executive |
| Fanny Fern | Popular columnist, humorist, novelist, and author of children's stories |
| Vincent Ferrini | Writer and poet |
| Gustavus Fox | Assistant secretary of the Navy during the Civil War |
| Edmund Freeman | One of the founders of Sandwich, Massachusetts; deputy governor of Plymouth Colony under Governor William Bradford |
| Tony Garofano | Member of the Massachusetts House of Representatives in 1920 and 1923–1935 |
| Bob Gaudet | Head men's ice hockey coach at Dartmouth College |
| John Geoghan | Priest; a key figure in the Roman Catholic sex abuse cases |
| Norman Hansen | Politician and government official who held various positions in Saugus |
| Harriet Russell Hart | Third woman ever elected to the Massachusetts House of Representatives, served 1925–1926 |
| Samuel Hawkes | 19th-century member of the Massachusetts House of Representatives in 1854 |
| Horatio G. Herrick | Sheriff of Essex County, Massachusetts (1867–1893) |
| Paul G. Hewitt | Physicist, former boxer, uranium prospector, author, and cartoonist |
| Pickmore Jackson | Shoe manufacturer and politician |
| William Jackson | English-American pottery manufacturer and politician |
| James Franklin Jeffrey | Diplomat, expert in political, security, and energy issues in the Middle East, Turkey, Germany, and the Balkans |
| Joseph Jenckes Sr. | Inventor and holder of first machine patent in America |
| Benjamin Newhall Johnson | Attorney and historian; his hunting camp became Breakheart Reservation |
| Phyllis Katsakiores | Member of the New Hampshire House of Representatives (1982–2012) |
| Rose Kaufman | Screenwriter, The Wanderers and Henry & June |
| Tim Kelly | Playwright |
| John B. Kennedy | City manager of Medford, Massachusetts (1957–1958); town manager of Norwood, Massachusetts (1951–1957) and Saugus (1958–1960); candidate for treasurer and receiver-general of Massachusetts in 1960 |
| Bobby Keyes | Guitarist and songwriter who has played and collaborated with a wide range of famous rock and roll, soul, blues, R&B, and pop recording artists |
| Dave Lucey | Registrar of Motor Vehicles, 1972–1974 |
| Susan Lynch | First Lady of New Hampshire |
| Doug Mackie | Offensive tackle who played for the New York Giants and Atlanta Falcons of the NFL and the Tampa Bay Bandits and New Jersey Generals of the United States Football League |
| William Moulton Marston | Psychologist, feminist theorist, and comic book writer who created Wonder Woman |
| Darrell Martinie | National radio personality and official state astrologer for Massachusetts |
| Colin McManus | Team USA ice dancer |
| Bob Montgomery | Former Major League Baseball catcher who played for the Boston Red Sox, 1970–1979 |
| Deborah Moody | The only woman to found a colonial settlement in early North America |
| Francis Moorehouse | General Electric executive and Saugus town manager |
| Benjamin F. Newhall | Businessman, abolitionist, politician, and writer |
| Henry Newhall | Businessman whose land holdings eventually formed the city of Santa Clarita, California |
| Eddie Palladino | Public address announcer for the Boston Celtics |
| Arlie Pond | Former Major League pitcher for the Baltimore Orioles |
| C. F. Nelson Pratt | Politician |
| Johnny Rae | Jazz drummer and vibraphonist |
| Joseph Roby | Parson of the Third Parish Church for 51 years; supporter of the American Revolution |
| Eileen Rose | Singer-songwriter |
| Derek Sanderson | Former Boston Bruins player |
| Glen Sather | Former Boston Bruins player; current president and general manager of the New York Rangers |
| Chris Serino | Former head men's hockey coach at Merrimack College; head baseball coach at the University of New Hampshire |
| James Shurtleff | Journalist, politician, and city manager |
| Harry Sinden | Former head coach, general manager, and team president of the Boston Bruins |
| Ricky Smokes | Professional wrestler signed to WWE |
| John P. Slattery | Member of the Massachusetts House of Representatives from the 12th Essex District, 1995–2003 |
| Nicholas Spanos | Professor of Psychology and director of the Laboratory for Experimental Hypnosis at Carleton University, 1975–1994; known for the study of hypnosis, skepticism, and debunking conspiracy theories |
| Art Spinney | Guard who played 9 seasons with the Baltimore Colts |
| Marion L. Starkey | Author, The Devil in Massachusetts |
| Art Statuto | Center who played for the Los Angeles Rams of the NFL and the Buffalo Bills of the All-America Football Conference |
| Edward Thompson Taylor | Methodist clergyman |
| Ella Cheever Thayer | Playwright and novelist |
| William Tudor | Wealthy lawyer and leading citizen of Boston |
| Mike Vecchione | Professional ice hockey player who currently plays for the Philadelphia Flyers of the National Hockey League |
| Josiah Warren | Individualist anarchist, inventor, musician, and author widely regarded as the first American anarchist |
| Sandra Whyte | Ice hockey player; gold medal winner at the 1998 Winter Olympics |
| Frederick Willis | Speaker of the Massachusetts House of Representatives, 1944–1948 |
| Donald Wong | Representative for the 9th Essex District of the Massachusetts House of Representatives; former chairman of the Saugus Board of Selectmen |
| Kevin Wortman | Former professional hockey player for the Calgary Flames |

== See also ==
- List of people from Massachusetts
