= Cheever =

Cheever is an English surname. It is from Anglo-Norman French chivere, chevre ‘goat’ (Latin capra ‘nanny goat’), applied as a nickname for an unpredictable or temperamental person, or a metonymic occupational name for a goatherd.

Notable people with the surname include:

- Abijah Cheever (1760–1843), American doctor and politician, descendant of Ezekiel Cheever
- Benjamin Cheever (born 1948), American writer and editor, son of John Cheever
- Benjamin H. Cheever Jr. (1850–1930), US Army officer
- Charles A. Cheever (1852–1900), American inventor and businessman
- Charlie Cheever (born 1981), American engineer and businessman, one of the founders of the website Quora
- Eddie Cheever (born 1958), American racing driver
- Eddie Cheever III (born 1993), Italian racing driver, son of Eddie Cheever
- Ezekiel Cheever (1614–1708), England-born schoolmaster
- George B. Cheever (1807–1890), American minister and abolitionist writer
- John Cheever (1912–1982), American novelist and short story writer
- Jonathan Cheever (born 1985), American snowboarder
- Joseph Cheever (1772–1872), American farmer and politician, brother of Abijah Cheever
- Michael Cheever (born 1973), American football center in the National Football League
- Ross Cheever (born 1964), American racing driver, brother of Eddie Cheever
- Susan Cheever (born 1943), American author, daughter of John Cheever

== See also ==
- Cheevers
