= Claude Welch =

Claude Welch may refer to:

- Claude Welch (theologian) (1922–2009), American theologian
- Claude E. Welch (1906–1996), American surgeon
- Claude E. Welch Jr. (born 1939), American political scientist
