= William Dodge =

William Dodge may refer to:

- William E. Dodge (1805–1883), American politician, businessman, and general
- William Dodge (bookseller) (1811–1875), American bookseller
- William E. Dodge Jr. (1833–1903), American businessperson and philanthropist
- W. Earl Dodge (1858–1886), college football player
- William de Leftwich Dodge (1867–1935), American artist
- William Dodge (bobsleigh) (1925–1987), American bobsledder
- William C. Dodge (1880–1973), American lawyer and politician from New York
- William I. Dodge (c. 1789–1873), American politician from New York
- William Hanson Dodge (died 1932), American photographer
- Bill Dodge, American law professor at UC Hastings
- Bill Dodge (footballer) (born 1937), former English footballer

== See also ==
- William Dodge Sample, U.S. naval officer
