= American Surgical Association =

Oldest surgical organization in the United States

The American Surgical Association is the oldest surgical organization in the United States.

== History ==
It was founded in 1880. Their publication, Annals of Surgery, was started in 1885.

A collection of the association's papers are held at the National Library of Medicine.

== Heads ==
- Samuel D. Gross (1880)
- Edward Mott Moore (1883)
- William Thompson Briggs (1884)
- Moses Gunn (1885)
- Hunter McGuire (1886)
- David Hayes Agnew (1887)
- David Williams Cheever (1888)
- David W. Yandell (1889)
- Claudius Henry Mastin (1890)
- Phineas Sanborn Conner (1891)
- Nicholas Senn (1892)
- James Ewing Mears (1893)
- Frederic Shepard Dennis (1894)
- Louis McLane Tiffany (1895)
- John Collins Warren (1896)
- Theodore F. Prewitt (1897)
- William W. Keen (1898)
- Robert F. Weir (1899)
- Roswell Park (1900)
- Deforest Willard (1901)
- Maurice H. Richardson (1902)
- Nathaniel P. Dandridge (1903)
- George Ben Johnston (1904)
- Albert Vander Veer (1905)
- Dudley Peter Allen (1906)
- William H. Carmalt (1907)
- C. B. De Nancre´ De (1908)
- Rudolph Matas (1909)
- Richard H. Harte (1910)
- Arpad G. Gerster (1911)
- Charles A. Powers (1912)
- William James Mayo (1913)
- George E. Armstrong (1914)
- Robert G. Leconte (1915)
- Samuel J. Mixter (1916)
- Thomas W. Huntington (1917)
- Lewis S. Pilcher (1918)
- George Emerson Brewer (1919)
- John B. Roberts (1920)
- John Miller Turpin Finney (1921)
- L. L. McArthur (1922)
- George Washington Crile (1923)
- Albert J. Ochsner (1924)
- John H. Gibbon Sr. (1925)
- Harvey Cushing (1926)
- Emmet Rixford (1927)
- Ellsworth Eliot Jr. (1928)
- Fred B. Lund (1929)
- Alexander Primrose (1930)
- Charles Horace Mayo (1931)
- Arthur Dean Bevan (1932)
- Daniel Fiske Jones (1933)
- Edward William Archibald (1934)
- Eugene H. Pool (1935)
- Evarts Ambrose Graham (1936)
- Arthur W. Elting (1937)
- Dallas B. Phemister (1938)
- Allen Whipple (1939)
- David Cheever (1940)
- Harvey B. Stone (1941)
- Vernon C. David (1942)
- Frederick A. Coller (1943)
- William Darrach (1944–45)
- Edward Delos Churchill (1946)
- Elliott Cutler (1947)
- William Gallie (1947)
- Fred Wharton Rankin (1948)
- Thomas G. Orr (1949)
- Samuel Clark Harvey (1950)
- Daniel C. Elkin (1951)
- Robert S. Dinsmore (1952)
- Howard Christian Naffziger (1953)
- John Heysham Gibbon (1954)
- Alfred Blalock (1955)
- Loyal Davis (1956)
- John H. Mulholland (1957)
- I. S. Ravdin (1958)
- Warren Henry Cole (1959)
- John D. Stewart (1960)
- J. Englebert Dunphy (1961)
- Oliver Cope (1962)
- Warfield M. Firor (1963)
- Robert M. Zollinger (1964)
- Leland S. McKittrick (1965)
- Oscar Creech Jr. (1966)
- William P. Longmire Jr. (1967)
- Owen Harding Wangensteen (1968)
- William A. Altemeier (1969)
- William D. Holden (1970)
- Francis Daniels Moore (1971)
- Jonathan E. Rhoads (1972)
- H. William Scott Jr. (1973)
- William H. Muller Jr. (1974)
- James Hardy (1975)
- Claude E. Welch (1976)
- David Sabiston (1977)
- Oliver H. Beahrs (1978)
- Tom Shires (1979)
- James V. Maloney Jr. (1980)
- C. Rollins Hanlon (1981)
- W. Dean Warren (1982)
- Mark M. Ravitch (1983)
- Eugene M. Bricker (1984)
- W. Gerald Austen (1985)
- Charles George Drake (1986)
- Henry T. Bahnson (1987)
- John Najarian (1988)
- John A. Mannick (1989)
- Robert Zeppa (1990)
- James C. Thompson (1991)
- Lloyd D. MacLean (1992)
- Seymour I. Schwartz (1993)
- George F. Sheldon (1994)
- Samuel A. Wells Jr. (1995)
- Clyde F. Barker (1996)
- Frank C. Spencer (1997)
- Lazar J. Greenfield (1998)
- Basil A. Pruitt Jr. (1999)
- John L. Cameron (2000)
- Haile Debas (2001)
- Murray Brennan (2002)
- R. Scott Jones (2003)
- Hiram Polk (2004)
- Carlos Alberto Pellegrini (2005)
- Jay L. Grosfeld (2006)
- Courtney M. Townsend Jr. (2007)
- Anthony D. Whittemore (2008)
- Donald Trunkey (2009)
- Kirby I. Bland (2010)
- Timothy J. Eberlein (2011)
- L.D. Britt (2012)
- Layton F. Rikkers (2013)
- Anna M. Ledgerwood (2014)
- James S. Economou (2015)
- Keith D. Lillemoe (2016)
- Ronald V. Maier (2017)
- E. Christopher Ellison (2018)
- Robin S. McLeod (2019, 2020)
- Selwyn M. Vickers (2021)
- Diana L. Farmer (2022)

== Awards ==
- American Surgical Association Foundation Fellowship Research Award
- ASA Medallion for Scientific Achievement
- ASA Flance-Karl Award
