= Robert Eames (politician) =

American miller and political figure

Member of the Massachusetts House of Representatives from Saugus
- In office 1816–1816
- Preceded by: District created
- Succeeded by: Joseph Cheever

Personal details
- Born: c. 1790 Roxbury, New Hampshire
- Occupation: Miller

Robert Eames (also spelled Robert Emes) was an American miller and politician who served as Saugus's first representative to the Massachusetts House of Representatives.

== Early life ==
Eames was born to Robert and Sally Eames in about 1790 in present-day Roxbury, New Hampshire. His family was involved in politics, with his father serving as Roxbury's first town moderator and brother Daniel Adams Eames also holding political office in Roxbury before moving to Saugus. Through Daniel Adams Eames, Eames was the uncle of Joseph Alexander Ames and Nathan Ames. Eames had one son, Lucius (born 1815) and one daughter, Elizabeth Willis (born 1817).

== Business career ==
In 1809, Eames constructed a fulling mill below the Sluice Pond Dam in Lynn, Massachusetts. He sold the mill in 1815 to silk dyers Andrew and John Hall of Malden, Massachusetts.

In 1811, Eames' brother Joseph started a Morocco leather manufacturing business on the Saugus River. He later added a gristmill and fulling mill to the property. Robert Eames joined his brother in this business in 1813. In 1817 the gristmill was converted into a facility to grind dyes, particularly camwood. In 1821, the Eames brothers ended their partnership and Joseph Eames ran the business solo until it burned down in 1847. He sold the property to Francis Scott of Salem, Massachusetts and it became the site of Scott's Mills.

From 1815 to 1822, Eames leased the grist and saw mills previously owned by Benjamin Sweetser to manufacture dyewoods, principally camwood.

== Politics ==
In 1814, Eames was one of the citizens of Lynn's West Parish who petitioned the Massachusetts General Court to have the area set off from Lynn and established as a separate municipality. On February 17, 1815 the West Parish was incorporated as the town of Saugus, Massachusetts. Eames was chosen to represent Saugus in the Massachusetts House of Representatives.
