= David Williams Cheever =

American surgeon (1831–1915)

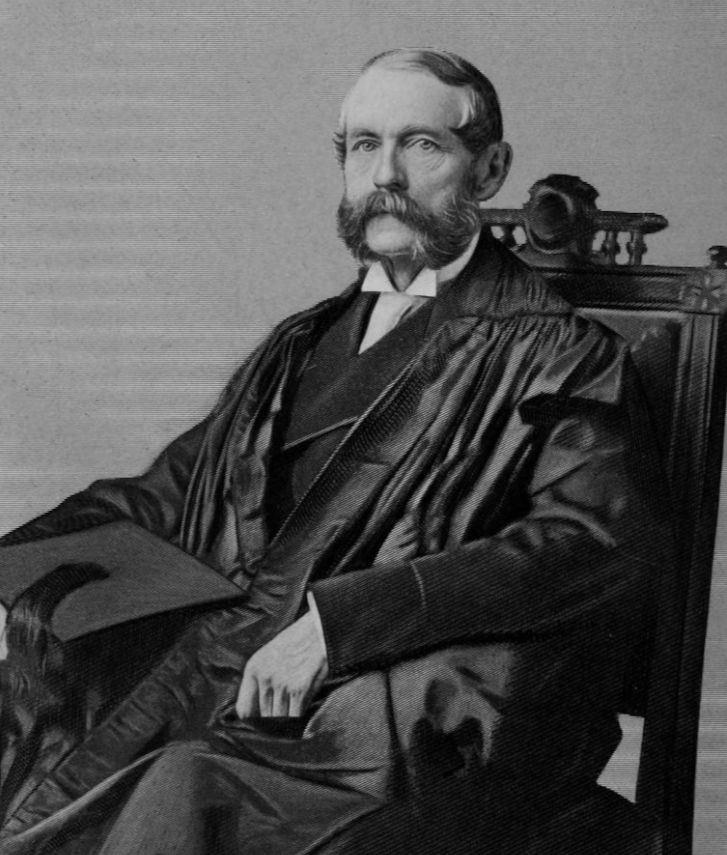
- Born: David Williams Cheever; November 30, 1831; Portsmouth, New Hampshire, U.S.
- Died: December 27, 1915 (aged 84); Boston, Massachusetts, U.S.
- Education: Harvard College; Harvard Medical School
- Occupation: Surgeon
- Spouse: Anna C. Nichols (m. 1860)
- Children: 5, including David Cheever

David Williams Cheever (November 30, 1831 – December 27, 1915) was an American medical doctor who was a leading surgeon and philanthropist in Boston during the late-19th and early-20th centuries.

== Early life ==
Cheever was born in Portsmouth, New Hampshire, on November 30, 1831, to Charles Augustus and Adeline (Haven) Cheever. He was a seventh-generation descendant of Ezekiel Cheever and both his father and grandfather (Abijah Cheever) were surgeons. He prepared for college under a private tutor and graduated from Harvard College in 1852 and Harvard Medical School in 1858. He also spent a summer semester at the Boylston Medical School. He interned at the Massachusetts state hospital on Rainsford Island.

== Career ==
Upon graduating from medical school, Cheever opened an office in Boston. He briefly served as a volunteer surgeon during American Civil War. From June 2, 1862, to August 2, 1862, he was the acting assistant surgeon at the Judiciary Square Hospital in Washington, D.C. When Boston City Hospital opened in 1864, he was appointed a visiting surgeon. He also worked as a surgeon at the Boston Dispensary and was an editor of the Boston Medical and Surgical Journal. He continued to work as a family physician after becoming a surgeon. In 1913, he became a professor emeritus of the city hospital.

From 1860 to 1868, Cheever was a demonstrator in anatomy at Harvard Medical School. In 1866, he was appointed an assistant professor of anatomy. He became an acting professor of clinical surgery in 1868 and a full professor seven years later. He was appointed a professor of surgery in 1882 and remained in this role until 1893, when he became a professor emeritus. From 1896 to 1908, he was a member of the Harvard Board of Overseers.

== Philanthropy ==
In 1889, Cheever established a fund to provide surgical instruments to each graduate of the City Hospital surgical department. In 1893, the established a scholarship at Harvard Medical School for first year students. He was president of the Massachusetts Medical Benevolent Society, which provided aid to struggling physicians and their families.

== Personal life and death ==
On October 9, 1860, Cheever married Anna C. Nichols. That had five children – David (1861–1864), Alice (1862–1948), Helen (1865–1960), Marion (1867–1897), Adeline (1874–1964), and David (1876–1955). David followed in his father's footsteps, becoming a surgeon at the Peter Brent Brigham Hospital and teaching at Harvard Medical School. Adeline Cheever was the wife of surgeon George Shattuck Whiteside.

Cheever resided at 557 Boylston Street in Boston. He had a summer home in Cohasset, Massachusetts for 21 years, but after his daughter Marion drowned there, the family spent its summers on a farm in Dedham, Massachusetts.

Cheever was a member of the College of Physicians of Philadelphia, a fellow of the American Academy of Arts and Sciences, vice president of the St. Botolph Club, and president of the Massachusetts Medical Society (1888–1890) and American Surgical Association (1888). From 1895 to 1907, he was a member of the Mount Auburn Corporation. During this time, he became an advocate of cremation. Cheever was politically independent, but usually voted Republican Party. He did not belong to a church.

Cheever died on December 27, 1915, at his home after a brief illness.
