= Selwyn M. Vickers =

American gastrointestinal surgical oncologist

- Born: Demopolis, Alabama, USA
- Education: Johns Hopkins University (BA, MD)
- Spouse: Janice (m. 1988)
- Scientific career
- Workplaces: Memorial Sloan Kettering Cancer Center; University of Alabama at Birmingham School of Medicine; University of Minnesota Medical School

Selwyn Maurice Vickers is an American gastrointestinal surgical oncologist. He serves as President and CEO of Memorial Sloan Kettering Cancer Center. Previously, Dr. Vickers was the senior vice president for Medicine and Dean of the University of Alabama at Birmingham School of Medicine and the CEO of both the UAB Health System and the UAB/Ascension St. Vincent's Alliance.

== Early life and education ==
Vickers was born in Demopolis, Alabama but was raised in Tuscaloosa and Huntsville. His parents were involved in the Civil rights movement and his father fought in the Korean War. Upon returning, his father accepted a faculty position Alabama A&M University which Vickers described as one of the most influential moments of his childhood. His uncle was also the first physician to graduate from Stillman College while his aunt was one of the first Black/African American women to receive a Ph.D. from Duke University.

For college, Vickers attended Johns Hopkins University, where he received his bachelor's degree in 1982, followed by a medical degree in 1986. As a medical student, Vickers was selected as a 1985 Commonwealth Fund Medical Fellow to support his research in intestinal physiology. He remained at Johns Hopkins for his surgical training and studied with John L. Cameron and Levi Watkins.

== Career ==
Upon completing his surgical training, Vickers completed two summer, post-graduate research fellowships, with the National Institutes of Health and trained at the John Radcliffe Hospital of Oxford University. Upon returning to North America, Vickers served as an instructor of surgery at Johns Hopkins for one year.

=== University of Alabama at Birmingham (1994-2006) ===
He joined the faculty of the University of Alabama at Birmingham's (UAB) Department of Surgery as an assistant professor in 1994. Once he joined the faculty, Vickers became a Robert Wood Johnson Foundation Research Fellow and was appointed director of UAB's Division of Gastrointestinal Surgery. During his early tenure at the institution, Vickers was also a principal investigator for the Pancreatic Cancer Specialized Program of Research Excellence (SPORE) grant to provide screening and education programs for diabetes and colon cancer for minority communities.

=== University of Minnesota ===
In 2006, Vickers left UAB to become the Jay Phillips Professor and Chair of the Department of Surgery at the University of Minnesota Medical School (U of M). He brought his SPORE grant to the U of M, which he used to focus on identifying and targeting pathways of pancreatic cancer progression and metastasis and developing an oncolytic adenovirus to attack pancreatic tumor stem cells. Vickers also became the principal investigator on the Enhancing Minority Participation in Clinical Trials (EMPaCT) to create a national consortia of five regional institutions to improve health disparities in America. As a result of his research efforts, Vickers was recognized as one of America's Leading Black Doctors and inducted into the Institute of Medicine (now the National Academy of Medicine).

=== University of Alabama at Birmingham (2013-2022) ===
Vickers returned to UAB in 2013 upon being named the next senior vice president for Medicine and dean of the University of Alabama at Birmingham School of Medicine. Once rejoining the faculty, Vickers also led the research collaborative Center for Healthy African American Men through Partnerships, a consortium of academic centers and community organizations that works to develop, implement and evaluate interventions to improve African American men's health through research, outreach, and training. Vickers was later recognized with an election to the Association of American Physicians and was named as the 2019 Dr. James T. Black Award recipient by the 100 Black Men of America, Inc.

During the COVID-19 pandemic, Vickers co-published an article in The American Journal of Medicine addressing the disparities between African American and white populations during the pandemic. He was also co-awarded a grant from the National Institute on Minority Health and Health Disparities for his collaborative project Advancing Surgical Cancer Care and Equity in the Deep South. In September 2020, Vickers was elected to the board of directors of Alabama Power while also serving as president-elect of the American Surgical Association.

While serving in these various roles both at UAB and off-site, Vickers was elected to serve on the Forma Therapeutics Holdings, Inc. board of directors. He was also inducted into the Alabama Academy of Honor for being an influential individual native to Alabama. In 2022, Vickers assumed the role of CEO of both the UAB Health System and the UAB/Ascension St. Vincent's Alliance.

=== Memorial Sloan Kettering Cancer Center ===
In June 2022, Vickers was selected as the CEO of Memorial Sloan Kettering Cancer Center, and began the role in September 2022. As CEO at the cancer center, Vickers serves as a Board of Directors observer for Break Through Cancer from 2022.

== Personal life ==
Vickers married his wife Janice in 1988 and they have four children together.

== Awards and honors ==
- Distinguished Alumnus, Johns Hopkins Medicine Alumni Association, 2024.
