= Robert Eames =

Robert Eames may refer to:

- Robert Eames (politician) (c. 1790–?), American politician and miller, member of the Massachusetts House of Representatives
- Robin Eames (Robert Henry Alexander Eames, born 1936), Northern Irish Anglican archbishop and peer
