= Carlos Alberto Pellegrini =

Argentine-born surgeon and academic

- Born: Amenábar, Santa Fe Province, Argentina
- Education: University of Rosario
- Occupation: Surgeon
- Medical career
- Institutions: University of California, San Francisco; University of Washington

Carlos Alberto Pellegrini is an American gastrointestinal surgeon born in Argentina. He is the former president of the American Surgical Association, former Chief Medical Officer at the University of Washington, and the former Henry N. Harkins Professor and Chair of Surgery at the University of Washington. He is a former president of the Society of Surgical Chairs, a regent of the American College of Surgeons, and a director of the American Board of Surgery. He also served in the US Army reserves, reaching the rank of Lt. Colonel (ret).

== Biography ==
Pellegrini was born to two physicians (his father of Italian heritage, his mother of Russian heritage), and spent his childhood years in rural Amenábar, in Santa Fe Province, Argentina. He attended medical school at the University of Rosario Medical School, graduating in 1971 and remaining there for surgical training until 1975. He emigrated to the U.S. in 1975, in part due to dissatisfaction with the prevailing political climate in Argentina. He completed his surgical residency at the University of Chicago and began working at the University of California, San Francisco in 1979, moving to the University of Washington in 1993 to assume the chairmanship of its Department of Surgery until his retirement in 2018.

== Clinical focus ==
Pellegrini's clinical focus was on minimally invasive surgery of the foregut (gastrointestinal surgery). He led the Swallowing Center and the Center for Videoendoscopic Surgery at the University of Washington.

== Research and education ==
As a researcher, Pellegrini has investigated a wide variety of disorders and surgical procedures. He has been involved in surgical education research as well and has been involved in the University of Washington's Mini-Medical School, an annual series of lectures and seminars on medical topics open to the public.

== Works ==
=== Books ===
- Surgery of the Gallbladder and Bile Ducts (1987, with Lawrence M. Way, MD)
- Surgery of the Esophagus (1997, with John G. Hunter, MD)

=== Selected articles ===
- Van Eaton, Erik G. Karen D. Horvath, Carlos A. Pellegrini (2005). Professionalism and the Shift Mentality: How to Reconcile Patient Ownership With Limited Work Hours. Archives of Surgery 140:230-235.
- Pellegrini, Carlos A., Andrew L. Warshaw, Haile T. Debas (2004). Residency training in surgery in the 21st century: A new paradigm. Surgery 136:5,953-965.
- Pellegrini, Carlos A (2006). Surgical Education in the United States: Navigating the White Waters. Annals of Surgery 244:3,335-342.

== Advisory roles ==
As a member of the Accreditation Council for Graduate Medical Education, Dr. Pellegrini was involved in the process of limiting U.S. medical residents to an 80-hour work week. He was a member of the American Surgical Association's Blue Ribbon Committee, which delivered an influential report on this topic and on surgical education in 2005 In response to the demands of the shortened work week, the department has pursued research into efficient and safe methods of handing off patients between shifts of residents. During his tenure, the Department of Surgery established the Washington, Wyoming, Alaska, Montana, and Idaho Institute for Simulation in Healthcare (WISH), a center for surgical education through various forms of simulated exercises and training. He is currently the chair of the board of directors of WISH.

Dr. Pellegrini was named to the Robert Wood Johnson Foundation Clinical Scholars Program's National Advisory Committee in November 2008. The committee is responsible for overseeing the Robert Wood Johnson Foundation Clinical Scholars Program and selecting its participants.

== Military career ==
Dr. Pellegrini served in the US Army reserves, reaching the rank of Lt. Colonel (ret). During the Desert Storm war in Iraq, Dr. Pellegrini was on active duty and headed the medical services of the US Army. In 1991, the US Army awarded him the Meritorious Service Medal.

== Honors, awards and recognitions ==
- Republic of France Legion of Honor
- Honorary fellow of the Royal Society of Surgeons
- Fundacion KONEX (Argentina) Special Mention for Science and Technology 2013
- Honorary Doctorate, Georgetown University (2026)
