= Benjamin Newhall Johnson =

American lawyer

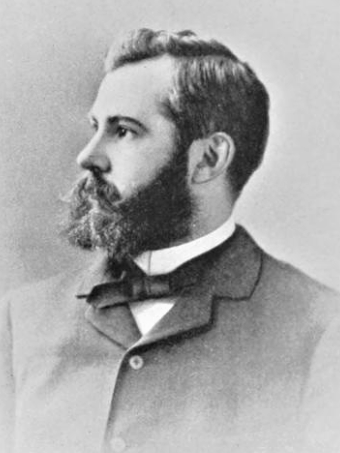
- Born: June 19, 1856; Lynn, Massachusetts
- Died: February 19, 1932 (aged 75); Lynn, Massachusetts
- Education: Harvard College
- Occupation: Attorney
- Political party: Republican
- Children: 3 sons, 2 daughters

Benjamin Newhall Johnson (June 19, 1856 – February 19, 1932) was an American attorney and historian who owned what would become Breakheart Reservation. He was also President of the Lynn Historical Society for 25 years and the President-General of the Sons of the American Revolution from 1931 to 1932.

== Early life ==
Johnson was born on June 19, 1856, in Lynn, Massachusetts, to Rufus and Ellen (Newhall) Johnson. His maternal grandfather was businessman, abolitionist, politician, and writer Benjamin F. Newhall. Johnson grew up in Saugus, Massachusetts, and attended public schools there. He went on to attend Chauncey Hall School and Phillips Exeter Academy. He graduated from Harvard College in 1878 cum laude with a Bachelor of Arts degree in philosophy. He went on to attend the Boston University School of Law. He completed his legal studies with the firm of Ives, Lincoln & Huntress and was admitted to the Essex County Bar on March 31, 1880.

== Business and legal career ==
After being admitted to the bar, Johnson opened a law office in Boston. From 1882 to 1884, Johnson was a partner of the firm Ives, Johnson, & Ives. After the death of Stephen P. Ives, Johnson continued alone until 1889, when he became associated with W. Orison Underwood. The two formed the firm of Johnson & Underwood shortly thereafter. In 1894, Robert P. Clapp became associated with the firm and three years later it became Johnson, Clapp & Underwood. With this firm, Johnson focused on commercial and railroad law. In 1919, Underwood retired and Frederick Manley Ives, the grandson of Johnson's first partner, replaced him.

In addition to his legal career, Johnson served a president of the Carver Cotton Gin Company, vice president of the Essex Trust Company of Lynn, the Lynn Institute for Savings, and the Lynn Gas and Electric Company. He was also a director of the Atlantic National Bank of Boston and the Boston Woven Hose and Rubber Company.

== Historian ==
Johnson had a deep interest in the histories of Lynn and Saugus. He was a charter member of the Lynn Historical Society. He was the organization's vice president from 1898 to 1899 and was its president from 1900 to 1909 and again from 1918 to 1932.

In 1929, Johnson served as chairman of the executive committee for the Tercentenary celebration of the settlement of The Third Plantation. That spring he traveled to England and on behalf of the city of Lynn and by the appointment of Lynn Mayor Ralph S. Bauer, he arranged a visit with Marchioness Gwladys Townshend, the mayor of King's Lynn. In connection with the celebration, Johnson constructed and presented a brick, fire-resistant museum to the Lynn Historical Society.

Johnson served a president of the Old Essex Chapter and the Massachusetts Society of the Sons of the American Revolution and served on the executive committee of the National Committee. In May 1931 he was elected President-General of the S.A.R. In this role he was especially active during the Sesquicentennial of the Siege of Yorktown. He made the presentation address at the unveiling of a tablet at Yorktown's Old Custom House in honor of Admiral François Joseph Paul de Grasse on October 17, 1931.

He was also a member of the Breed Family Association and the Society of Colonial Wars.

== Civic involvement ==
Around the same time he began his law practice, Johnson settled in Lynn. He was a member of many of the city's social clubs, including the Park and Oxford clubs of Lynn. He was president of the Oxford Club, which was Lynn's largest social club, from 1890 to 1893. In 1894, Johnson was appointed to the commission to revise Lynn's City Charter. The only time he held political office in Lynn was when he served on the city's school committee from 1890 to 1893. During World War I, Johnson was a Four Minute Man for the Committee on Public Information.

In 1907, Johnson was appointed chairman of the Metropolitan Improvement Commission by Governor Curtis Guild, Jr. The commission issued a report in 1909 that was widely used in the study of improving transportation, harbor facilities, and other developments in Greater Boston.

Outside of Lynn, Johnson was a member of the Boston, Massachusetts and American Bar Associations, the Harvard Clubs of Boston and New York, the Algonquin Club, The Bostonian Society, the Boston City Club, the Tedesco Country Club, the Appalachian Mountain Club, and the American Forestry Association.

Johnson was a Republican and was involved with many of the party's clubs.

== Breakheart Hill Forest ==
In 1891, Johnson, Micajah Clough, and John Bartlett began purchasing land in the Six Hundred Acres, an area of wilderness in Saugus, for use as a hunting retreat which they would call Breakheart Hill Forest. The partners created two lakes on the property, Upper Pond and Lower Pond, and stocked them with fish. Johnson purchased a log cabin in Maine, numbered all of its parts, and brought it down to, where it was rebuilt on the shore of Lower Pond. The retreat was officially opened on June 12, 1891. In the early 1900s the partners increased the size of the property.

== Personal life ==
In 1879, Johnson became affiliated with the First Universalist Church of Lynn. He was elected a member of the Parish on March 26, 1883, and received into Church membership on April 8, 1887. He was a superintendent of the Church School from 1886 to 1890, a trustee from 1888 to 1893 and in 1895, and chairman of the Board of Management from 1917 to 1921 and again from 1924 to 1928.

On June 15, 1881, Johnson married Ida Oliver of Saugus. They had two children, Romilly and Marian. Romilly, also known as George Romilli, was a composer who wrote the score for the Broadway musical Floretta with George Bagby. Ida Johnson died on May 27, 1894, in Lynn of pneumonia. On June 18, 1896, Johnson married Virginia Vernon Newhall. They had three children, Richard, Benjamin Jr., and Virginia, but only their sons lived into adulthood. Virginia Newhall Johnson died on July 5, 1926.

== Death ==
Johnson died on February 19, 1932, at his home in Lynn after several months of illness. Civic memorial services were held at the First Universalist Church in Lynn on March 20, 1932.

In his will, Newhall left $35,000 in public gifts – $5,000 to the Methodist Episcopal Church of East Saugus to be used for the salary of the pastor, $5,000 to the town of Saugus for the purchase of library books, $10,000 to Radcliffe College for the establishment of the Virginia N. Johnson scholarship fund for worthy young women, preferably from Lynn, $5,000 to the First Universalist Church of Lynn, and $10,000 the Lynn Historical Society.

In 1934, the executors for Johnson and Clough sold the Breakheart Hill Forest to the Metropolitan District Commission for use as a state park.
