= Jonathan Makepeace =

American politician (1774–1850)

Member of the Massachusetts House of Representatives from Saugus
- In office 1823–1823
- Preceded by: Abijah Cheever
- Succeeded by: John Shaw^{1}

Personal details
- Born: May 7, 1774 Norton, Massachusetts
- Died: February 6, 1850 (aged 75) Saugus, Massachusetts
- Spouses: Anna Nye (m. 1799; died 1826) Mary Stocker (m. 1829–1850)
- Occupation: Snuff and chocolate manufacturer

Jonathan Makepeace also known as Major Makepeace was an American businessman and political figure who manufactured snuff and held political office in Saugus, Massachusetts.

== Early life ==
Makepeace was born on May 7, 1774, in Norton, Massachusetts. On July 10, 1799, he married Anna Nye in her hometown of Hardwick, Massachusetts. They had four daughters and two sons; Peris Nye (1801–1822), Ann Maria (1803–1825), Mary Ann (1805–1826), Deborah Briggs (1809–1835), Jonathan Briggs (1802–1803) and Jonathan Jr. (1815–1836).

== Business ==
In 1792, Makepeace's uncle, George Makepeace, purchased an abandoned mill on the Saugus River. In 1797 Jonathan Makepeace began manufacturing chocolate at the mill. The chocolate business was later taken over by Amariah Childs. In 1798, Makepeace took over his uncle's snuff business, which he continued until 1844. Makepeace was known for the attention he gave to his product, which became known nationwide.

== Politics ==
In 1814, Makepeace was a signer of a petition that requested that Lynn's Second Parish be set off as a separate town known as Westport. The plan was abandoned, however the following year the Second Parish separated from Lynn and became the Town of Saugus. Saugus' first Town Meeting was held on March 13, 1815, and Makepeace was appointed to the position of Sealer of Weights and Measurers and elected to the town's first Board of Selectmen, Assessors, and Overseers of the Poor as well as its first School Committee. He later he served as Saugus' Town Treasurer.

Makepeace was Saugus' delegate to the Massachusetts Constitutional Convention of 1820–1821 and represented Saugus in the Massachusetts House of Representatives in 1823.

== Later life and death ==
Anna Makepeace died on July 3, 1826. On August 9, 1829, Makepeace married Mary Stocker, of Saugus, Massachusetts.

Makepeace died on February 6, 1850, in Saugus.

== Notes ==
1. Until 1857, a majority of votes at a town meeting was needed to elect a representative to the Massachusetts House of Representatives. If no person received a majority of votes, no representative was sent. No representative was selected in 1824 and 1825, but John Shaw was chosen in 1826.
