= Cheevers =

Cheevers is a surname. Notable people with the surname include:

- Augustine Cheevers (1686–1778), Irish clergyman
- Gerry Cheevers (born 1940), Canadian ice hockey player
- Hamp Cheevers (born 1996), American football player
- Luke Cheevers (born 1940), Irish singer
- Katherine Evans and Sarah Cheevers (Sarah Cheevers 1608–1664), English Quaker activists

== See also ==
- Cheever
