= Sarah Fisher Ames =

American sculptor

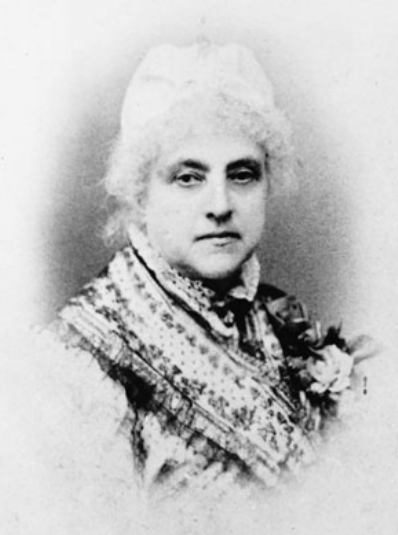
- Born: Sarah Fisher Clampitt; 13 Aug 1817; Lewes, Delaware, USA
- Died: 1901 (aged 83–84); Washington, D.C., USA
- Known for: Sculpture
- Spouse: Joseph Alexander Ames

Sarah Fisher Ames (1817–1901) was an American sculptor, best known for a bust of Abraham Lincoln that she produced in 1866.

== Biography ==
Sarah Fisher Clampitt was born on 13 August 1817 in Lewes, Delaware. She studied art in Boston and in Rome, and married Joseph Alexander Ames, a portrait painter, in 1845. While in Boston, she may have attended "Conversations" hosted by women's activist Margaret Fuller. The couple spent time in Rome, where Sarah Ames studied Italian sculpture. Little else is known about her early life.

She produced sculptures of notable Americans, including C. T. Brooks (1858), John Andrew (1867), Ulysses S. Grant (1868), Anson Burlingame, Ross Winans, and at least five busts of Abraham Lincoln. During the American Civil War, Ames worked as a volunteer nurse, rising to direct the hospital situated in the U.S. Capitol. She was a good friend of Lincoln, either through her position at the hospital or the antislavery movement. Rufus Wilson, author of Lincoln in Portraiture, claimed that Ames knew Lincoln "in an intimate and friendly way" through her work at the hospital.

Ames was one of the first sculptors of Lincoln. By 1865, she had created a plaster bust of Lincoln, which she received a patent for, and sold plaster replications of. In 1866 or 1868 Ames was commissioned to create a marble bust of Lincoln by the U.S. Congress. In 1868, the Pennsylvania Academy of the Fine Arts exhibited the bust. Her work has been compared to the Lincoln bust produced around the same time by Vinnie Ream. Her 1866 bust of Lincoln is held in the U.S. Capitol Building. Her busts of Lincoln are also located at the Massachusetts State House, the Williams College Museum of Art, the Lynn Historical Society, and the Woodmere Art Museum.

Ames exhibited her work at The Woman's Building at the 1893 World's Columbian Exposition in Chicago, Illinois.

She died in Washington, D.C., on 8 March 1901.

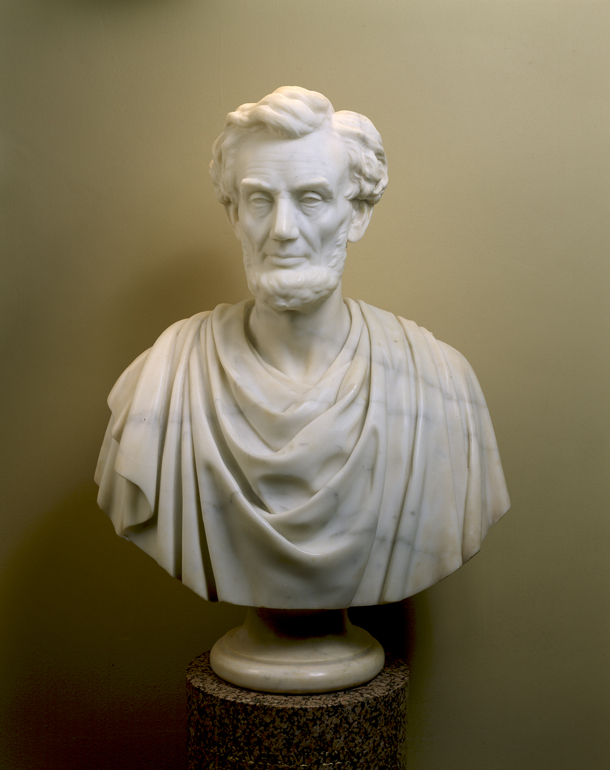
Abraham Lincoln by Sarah Fisher Clampitt Ames, 1868
