= Hiram Polk =

Hiram C. Polk Jr. is a native of Jackson, Mississippi and alumnus of Millsaps College and the Harvard Medical School. He served as the Ben A. Reid Professor and Chairman of Surgery at the University of Louisville from 1971–2005. Polk trained in Surgery at Washington University in St. Louis and was a fellow at the Lister Institute of Preventive Medicine in London before receiving an academic appointment at the University of Miami and later becoming a full professor and director of pediatric surgery at Jackson Memorial Hospital. In 1971, at the relatively young age of 35, he was recruited to the University of Louisville as Chairman of Surgery and oversaw the development of the department into a well-respected center for research and surgical education. Upon his stepping down as chairman, the University of Louisville department of surgery was re-dedicated as the Hiram C. Polk Department of Surgery and an endowed chair was established in his name. Noted advances that occurred by the division under his chairmanship include the development and first implantation of the Abiocore artificial heart and the organization of one of the world's first hand transplant programs. While Chairman at Louisville, Polk trained more than 230 surgical residents, all of whom hold board certification in general surgery. Some of the surgical residents have become academic surgery chairmen at medical schools in the United States.

Polk is known for his pioneering research on proper surgical antibiotic use to reduce surgical site infections, burn care, concepts in treatment of melanoma, surgical oncology, hiatal hernia treatment, Trauma surgery and systems development, and many contributions in the development of contemporary surgical training methods and models.

Since 1963, he has authored or co-authored over 450 papers and journal articles, 152 textbook chapters and 11 books. He served as editor in chief from 1986–2004 of The American Journal of Surgery, and was honored with an unprecedented issue in his honor in August 2005. He is currently Emeritus Editor-in-Chief of that journal. Polk has also served as chairman of the Residency Review Committee (Accreditation Council on Graduate Medical Education), President of the Southeastern Surgery Society, President of the American Surgical Association, President of the Society of Surgical Oncology, President of the Society for Surgery of the Alimentary Tract, President of the Kentucky Surgical Society, Governor of the American College of Surgeons, Chairman of VA Merit Review Board, Chairman of Kentucky Division of the American Cancer Society, and President of the Association for Academic Surgery among others.

In 1995 he was inducted as an Honorary Member of the Royal College of Surgeons of Edinburgh, Scotland, the oldest surgical college in the world.

On Tuesday, December 20, 2011, the University announced that Polk had been named an Honorary Fellow of the Royal College of Surgeons of England.

Polk is also a figure well known in the thoroughbred horse racing industry. He is a member of the Jockey Club and a former director of the Thoroughbred Owners and Breeders Association.

Millsaps College named Polk its 2005 Alumnus of the year.

His current wife is Susan Galandiuk, M.D., a colorectal surgeon.
