= Francis Sargent Cheever =

Francis Sargent Cheever (August 20, 1909 – September 19, 1997) was an American medical doctor who was the president of the American Association of Immunologists, dean of the University of Pittsburgh School of Medicine, and president of the University of Pittsburgh Health Center.

== Early life ==
Cheever was born on August 20, 1909, in Wellesley, Massachusetts. He was a fifth-generation physician. His father, David Cheever, was a professor at Harvard Medical School and surgeon at the Peter Brent Brigham Hospital. His mother, Jane Welles Sargent, was the granddaughter of H. H. Hunnewell.

Cheever graduated from Harvard College in 1932. In 1933, he was awarded the Lionel de Jersey Harvard scholarship for a year's study at Emmanuel College, Cambridge. He graduated from Harvard Medical School in 1936 and interned at Presbyterian Hospital in New York City.

== Career ==
From 1938 to 1941, Cheever was a teacher and researcher in bacteriology at Harvard Medical School. From 1941 to 1946, he served in the United States Navy, where he headed the department of epidemiology at the Naval Medical School. He then served as the director of the Enteric Pathogen Laboratory. He retired with the rank of Commander. From 1946 to 1950, Cheever was an assistant professor at Harvard Medical School. In 1949, he and three other members of the school's Department of Bacteriology and Immunology investigated a case of presumed murine encephalitis. They instead discovered murine coronavirus, which they named JHM, after Harvard microbiologist John Howard Mueller.

In 1950, Cheever became a professor of microbiology at the University of Pittsburgh Graduate School of Public Health. On January 30, 1958, he was named dean of the University of Pittsburgh School of Medicine. On April 25, 1967, he was promoted to vice chancellor of the schools of health professionals. In this role, he oversaw the educational programs of the university's schools of medicine, public health, dentistry, nursing, and pharmacy and coordinated the university's relationships with the members of the University of Pittsburgh Health Center. From 1970 to 1974, he was president of the University Health Center.

Cheever retired from the University of Pittsburgh in 1974 and moved back to Wellesley. From 1974 to 1977, he was a visiting professor of microbiology at Harvard Medical School. From 1978 to 1982, he was a trustee of Massachusetts General Hospital.

== Personal life and death ==
On June 27, 1942, Cheever married Julia Whitney Martin. They had four children. Julia Cheever died in 1988 and a year later, Cheever married Jane Garfield, a granddaughter of James A. Garfield and widow of Cheever's brother, Charles. Cheever died of pneumonia on September 19, 1997, at a senior living community in Westwood, Massachusetts.
