= William W. Boardman (Massachusetts) =

American cordwainer and politician (1771–1847)

Member of the Massachusetts House of Representatives from Saugus
- In office 1837–1838
- Preceded by: Joseph Cheever
- Succeeded by: Charles Sweetser

Saugus Town Clerk
- In office 1834–1841
- Preceded by: Issac Childs
- Succeeded by: Benjamin F. Newhall

Personal details
- Born: 1771 Lynn, Massachusetts
- Died: November 7, 1847 (aged 76) Saugus, Massachusetts
- Party: Democratic Party
- Spouse(s): Julia Davis (1825–1831; her death); Sabrina Brown (1833–1847; his death)
- Occupation: Cordwainer

William W. Boardman (1771–1847) was an American cordwainer and politician who held office in Saugus, Massachusetts.

Boardman was born in 1771 in Lynn, Massachusetts to Samuel and Abigail Boardman. He ran a shoe shop in an old school house adjacent to his home. He held numerous political offices in Saugus, including Selectman, Town Clerk (1834–1841), and State Representative (1837–1838). He was a member of the Democratic Party. He was married to Julia Davis from 1825 until her death in 1831 and Sabrina Brown from January 1, 1833 until his death on November 7, 1847. He was predeceased by one son, Arthur L. Boardman (1840–1845), from his second marriage.
