= James Ewing Mears =

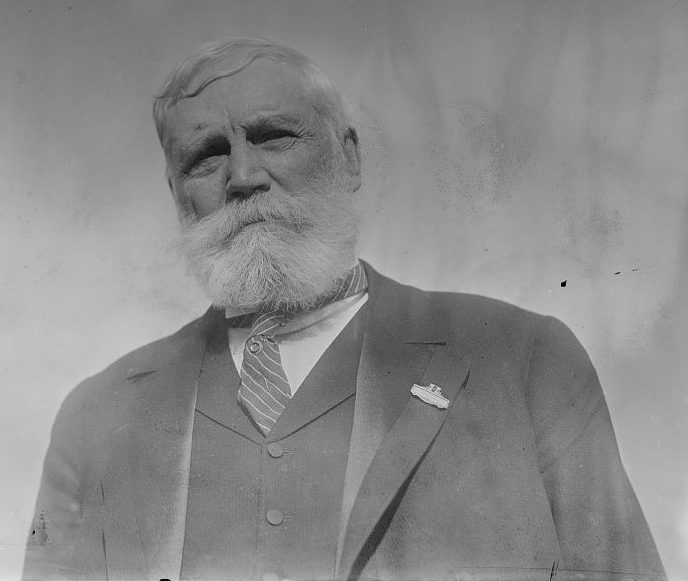
- Born: October 17, 1838; Indianapolis, Indiana
- Died: May 28, 1919 (aged 80)
- Occupations: Surgeon, Researcher, Author

James Ewing Mears, also J. Ewing Mears M.D., LL.D. (October 17, 1838 – May 28, 1919) was a surgeon and author. He was a pioneer in jaw and mouth surgeries. He was the first to propose the use of Gasserian ganglionectomy for the treatment of trigeminal neuralgia. He was the first surgeon in the United States to successfully perform a subcutaneous osteotomy for the relief of old dislocations. He was the first to open the peritoneal cavity to drain pus. He was professor of anatomy and clinical surgery at the Pennsylvania College of Dental Surgery and demonstrator of surgery at Jefferson Medical College. He was a charter member of the American Surgical Association and became its president in 1894.

== Biography ==
He was born on October 17, 1838, in Indianapolis, Indiana, to George Washington Mears and Caroline Sydney Ewing. He attended Trinity College, Hartford and in 1863 he entered Jefferson Medical School. In 1878 he authored a textbook on emergency surgery including amputations. He wrote a paper in 1875 describing an operation whereby the peritoneal cavity was opened to drain pus. In 1910 he wrote a book on the role of reducing yellow fever during the building of the Panama Canal. Mears also lectured Doc Holliday on surgery and anatomy while in Philadelphia, where he lived at 1429 Walnut Street. He died on May 28, 1919.

== Publications ==
- Practical Surgery: Including Surgical Dressings, Bandaging, Ligations and Amputations. Philadelphia: Lindsay & Blakiston, 1878.
- Medicine and Surgery in the Orient: Early Days of the American Surgical Association. Philadelphia, 1908.
- The Old and the Beginning of the New in Surgery. Philadelphia, 1909.
- The Problem of Race Betterment. Philadelphia: WM. J. Dornan, 1910.
- The Triumph of American Medicine in the Construction of the Panama Canal. Philadelphia: WM. J. Dornan, 1911.
- The destiny of the American Surgical Association. Philadelphia: WM. J. Dornan, 1917.
