= Robin McLeod =

Canadian surgeon (1951–2024)

Robin McLeod OC
- Born: August 24, 1951; Spruce Grove, Alberta, Canada
- Died: February 6, 2024 (aged 72)
- Education: Bachelor of Science; Doctor of Medicine
- Alma mater: University of Alberta; University of Toronto
- Known for: Studies on colorectal cancer, inflammatory bowel disease and evidence-based medicine
- Children: 2

Robin McLeod OC (August 24, 1951 – February 6, 2024) was a Canadian surgeon and medical researcher known for her contributions to clinical epidemiology, health services research, and evidence-based surgery. She played an important role in transforming surgical education, patient care, and medical research in Canada. She was made an Officer of the Order of Canada in 2019.

== Early life ==
Robin McLeod was born on August 24, 1951, in Spruce Grove, Alberta, to Doug and Frances McLeod. She obtained her Bachelor of Science and Doctor of Medicine degrees from the University of Alberta. Encouraged by her uncle, Trevor Sandy, a general surgeon in Vancouver, she pursued a medical degree and graduated in 1975, at a time when few women entered the field.

== Career ==
McLeod started her surgical career with a residency at the University of Toronto and also had stints at McMaster University and the Cleveland Clinic.

McLeod joined the University of Toronto in 1986, where she became a professor of surgery, training residents in general and colorectal surgery. McLeod's works on evidence-based medicine and clinical trials resulted in studies that significantly impacted surgical practices, particularly in colorectal surgery and inflammatory bowel disease. As an advocate for evidence-based medicine, she made a case for post-operative patients to get back on their feet and move after surgery as against then prevailing guidance which had encouraged patients to stay in bed; moving right away was found to improve recovery times. Some of the other practices that she had advocated included pre-operative patients being asked to exercise and quit smoking, and surgeons being asked to keep patients warm and avoid catheters and tubes to the extent possible.

McLeod served as the president of the Canadian Association of General Surgeons, Society for Surgery of the Alimentary Tract, and the American Surgical Association. She also served as the vice president for Clinical Programs & Quality Initiatives at Cancer Care Ontario. McLeod started Evidence Based Reviews in Surgery, a journal study group for North American surgeons.

In 1997, McLeod won the James IV Association of Surgeons Canadian Travelling Fellowship. In 2019, she was appointed an Officer of the Order of Canada, in recognition of her influence on medical practice, knowledge translation, and surgical education.

== Personal life ==
In 1981, McLeod married John Fauquier, and together they had two daughters.

McLeod died on February 6, 2024, at the age of 72. She had been diagnosed with Alzheimer's disease three years earlier. Her daughter had run ten triathlons across Canada to raise awareness of Alzheimer's disease and in support of her mother.
