= William Jackson (Saugus, Massachusetts) =

American politician

Member of the Massachusetts House of Representatives from Saugus
- In office 1827–1828
- Preceded by: John Shaw
- Succeeded by: Abijah Cheever

Personal details
- Born: Manchester, England
- Died: March 5, 1829 Saugus, Massachusetts, U.S.

William Jackson was an English-American pottery manufacturer and politician from Saugus, Massachusetts.

== Pottery manufacturing ==
Jackson arrived in Saugus (then part of Lynn) from Manchester, England in 1808 and bought a small farm and part of a meadow that would become known as "Jackson's Meadow". Jackson found a deposit of fine clay on his land. Jackson sought to use his clay to make earthenware crockery. He constructed a plant consisting of one large building and two smaller ones and procured the best equipment and workmen available. Production began in 1811, however, he soon found that the clay could only be used to make common redware, not the fine kind of ware he had hoped to make. The factory continued for four years, but became unprofitable and was abandoned.

== Politics ==
In 1814, Jackson was a signer of a petition that requested that Lynn's Second Parish be set off as a separate town known as Westport. The plan was abandoned, however the following year the Second Parish separated from Lynn and became the Town of Saugus. Saugus' first Town Meeting was held on March 13, 1815, and Jackson was elected Saugus' first Town Moderator.

In 1827 and 1828, Jackson represented Saugus in the Massachusetts House of Representatives.

== Personal life ==
Jackson married Mary Stocker Stanford on January 10, 1809. Their son, Pickmore Jackson, also served as a state representative from Saugus. Jackson died on March 5, 1829.
