= David Cheever =

David Cheever (June 25, 1876 – August 13, 1955) was an American medical doctor who was a professor of surgery at Harvard Medical School and surgeon at the Peter Brent Brigham Hospital.

== Early life ==
Cheever was born in Boston, June 25, 1876. His father, David Williams Cheever, was a seventh-generation descendant of Ezekiel Cheever and a leading surgeon for over a half-century. He prepared for college at the Hopkinson School and graduated from Harvard College in 1897.

== Career ==
=== Surgery ===
Cheever graduated from Harvard Medical School in 1901. He had a two year internship at Boston City Hospital then studied for eight months in Europe. From 1905 to 1912, he was an assistant surgeon at City Hospital. In 1912, he and Dr. John Homans were chosen to be the first surgeons as the new Peter Brent Brigham Hospital. In 1917, he took over as acting surgeon-in-chief after Dr. Harvey Cushing entered the United States Army Medical Corps. He retired from Brigham Hospital in 1939, but returned during World War II to once again serve as acting chief surgeon, this time filling in for Dr. Elliott Cutler.

=== Harvard ===
From 1903 to 1913, Cheever taught in the anatomy department at Harvard Medical School. In 1913, he became an assistant and demonstrator in anatomy.

In 1915, Cheever, President of Harvard University A. Lawrence Lowell, and Herbert H. White sprearheaded the formation of the second Harvard Surgical Unit, a volunteer contingent of medical personnel from Harvard who provided medical assistance to the British Expeditionary Force in France during World War I. Cheever was the unit's chief surgeon from December 1915 to June 1916.

Cheever was appointed Associate Professor of Surgery in 1922 and Associate Professor of Surgery Emeritus in 1939. He was a guest lecturer at the Chicago Surgerical Society in 1939 and the University of Toronto in 1941. From 1940 to 1946, he was a member of the Harvard Board of Overseers.

=== Professional associations ===
Cheever was a member of the Société Internationale de Chirurgie Orthopédique et de Traumatologie, Sigma Xi, and Alpha Omega Alpha. In 1930, he was elected a fellow of the American Academy of Arts and Sciences. He was an honorary fellow of the Royal Society of Medicine. From 1905 to 1911, he was secretary of the Harvard Medical School Alumni Association.

Cheever was president of the American Surgical Association, Boston Medical Library, New England Surgical Society, and Boston Surgical Society. He was the first son of a former ASA president to himself become president.

== Personal life ==
On June 8, 1907, Cheever married Jane Welles Sargent, daughter of Francis William Sargent and Jane Welles Hunnewell and granddaughter of H. H. Hunnewell. The ceremony was held at the Eliot Church in Natick, Massachusetts and the reception was held at the H. H. Hunnewell estate. They had five children – David, Francis Sargent, Charles Ezekiel, Daniel Sargent, and Jane Hunnewell. Francis Sargent Cheever was the president of the American Association of Immunologists (1963–1964), dean of the University of Pittsburgh School of Medicine (1958–1969), president of the University of Pittsburgh Medical Center (1970–1974), and a member of the Massachusetts General Hospital board of trustees (1978–1982).

One of Cheever's nephews was Governor of Massachusetts Francis Sargent. A grandson, Daniel S. Cheever Jr., was president of Simmons University and Wheelock College.

Cheever was elected a member of the Massachusetts Historical Society in 1941 and regularly attended meetings until illness prevented him from doing so.

Cheever died on August 13, 1955, at his summer home in Wellesley, Massachusetts. He was predeceased by his wife, who died in 1940.
