= Ezekiel Cheever School =

Location
- 456 Lombard Street; New Haven, Connecticut; United States

Information
- Established: 1896

Ezekiel Cheever School was a school located on Lombard St. in the Fair Haven neighborhood of New Haven, Connecticut, USA. The school opened in 1896 and remained as late as 1967. It was named for schoolteacher Ezekiel Cheever.
