= Diana L. Farmer =

American pediatric surgeon

- Spouse: Charles Cauldwell (m. 1983)

Academic background
- Education: BSc, marine studies and molecular biology, 1977, Wellesley College; MD, University of Washington School of Medicine

Diana L. Farmer is an American pediatric surgeon. She is the Pearl Stamps Stewart Professor of Surgery and chair of the Department of Surgery at the University of California, Davis and surgeon-in-chief of UC Davis Children's Hospital. In 2010, Farmer was inducted as a fellow into the Royal College of Surgeons of England, becoming the second woman surgeon from the United States to receive this honor.

== Early life and education ==
Farmer grew up in Chicago and Boise, Idaho, to a flight attendant mother and Navy fighter pilot father. Her grandfather was a surgeon in Nebraska who graduated from the now defunct National University of St. Louis. Upon completing her Bachelor of Science degree in marine sciences and molecular biology from Wellesley College, Farmer conducted research at Woods Hole Oceanographic Institute. As a result, she was named a Rhodes Scholar finalist. While driving to her interview, she was involved in a car accident and chose to pursue a career in medicine while recovering from her injuries. She earned her M.D. from the University of Washington School of Medicine in 1983, where she also completed her internship. She finished her residency at the University of California, San Francisco (UCSF) in 1993 where she was introduced to fetal surgery. After a surgical fellowship in Michigan, Farmer was awarded a Luce Scholarship to study medicine in Asia and moved to Singapore with her husband.

== Career ==
In 1988, Farmer returned to UCSF and became the first female fetal surgeon. As the UCSF Children’s Hospital Surgeon-in-Chief, Farmer’s research interests include fetal therapy interventions for myelomeningocele and other birth defects. In January 2010, Farmer was inducted as a fellow into the Royal College of Surgeons of England, becoming the second woman surgeon from the United States to receive this honor. The following year, she was also elected a Member of the National Academy of Medicine.

Upon joining the faculty of University of California, Davis, Farmer became the Pearl Stamps Stewart Professor of Surgery and chair of the Department of Surgery and surgeon-in-chief of UC Davis Children's Hospital. In February 2019, she was elected to the Board of Regents of the American College of Surgeons. While serving in these roles, Farmer continued her research into curing spina bifida. In 2019, Farmer and Aijun Wang identified exosomes and galectin 1 as key to protecting neurons and ultimately reducing the lower-limb paralysis associated with the birth defect. Due to her research, Farmer won a 2020 U21 Award for advancing global perspectives in her field. She was later awarded a grant to co-launch the world’s first human clinical trial using stem cells to treat spina bifida with Aijun Wang. The following year, Farmer became the third woman named president-elect of the American Surgical Association.

== Personal life ==
Farmer married her husband Charles Cauldwell in 1983.
