= Claude E. Welch =

American surgeon

- Born: March 14, 1906; Stanton, Nebraska, United States
- Died: March 9, 1996 (aged 89)
- Education: Doane College; Harvard Medical School
- Medical career
- Profession: Surgeon
- Institutions: Harvard Medical School Massachusetts General Hospital
- Sub-specialties: Abdominal surgery
- Awards: Distinguished Service Award from the AMA

Claude Emerson Welch (March 14, 1906 – March 9, 1996) was an internationally recognized American surgeon, whose career spanned forty years. For most of those forty years, Welch worked at Massachusetts General Hospital. He was involved with a variety of activities that included "patient care, teaching, clinical research, establishment of funds to maintain such activities, promotion of all aspects of medical education, and strengthening of ties between the government, the courts, the legal profession and physicians."

Known as a "bold and skillful surgeon in the abdomen," Welch performed anywhere between 15,000 and 20,000 procedures by the age of 75. He served as president in 8 of the 20 medical associations to which he belonged, wrote more than 200 articles and chapters, authored or edited six books, including his own autobiography, developed a safe technique for performing a duodenostomy, and was one of only six physicians summoned to Rome to consult about the treatment of Pope John Paul II when he was shot in 1981.

While there is no doubt about his skill with a scalpel, he set himself apart from other surgeons by establishing and maintaining a superb rapport with his patients – something he considered essential to good patient care. Beyond the operating room, Welch fought for racial equality at the American Medical Association (AMA) and to establish standards for American Medical Practice. Welch considered these items among some of the most important things he did.

"His intelligence, diligence, attention to detail, restraint leavened with generosity, caring and a touch of humor brought him the trust of his peers and a succession of assignments, the summation of which truly characterizes him as one of the great surgical statesmen America has produced."

== Early years and education ==
Claude E. Welch was the eldest child of John and Lettie Phelan Welch. He was born on March 14, 1906, in the town of Stanton, Nebraska. Welch advanced through three grades in a span of three months.

By the age of 12, he was working in a local drugstore, DeWitt and Drewelow's, helping to distribute prescriptions. He continued to work at the drugstore throughout the school years.

Welch joined Doane College in 1923 to major in chemistry. He participated in athletics and earned "Honor D" for athletic accomplishment.

Two months before graduation, Welch decided to switch fields from working in a laboratory as a chemist to medical field even though he wanted to earn master's in chemistry, which he did from the University of Missouri. Before that, he completed the premedical requirements necessary to study medicine from the Columbia University. At the University of Missouri, he wrote his thesis on a new diketopiperazine compound that he had discovered, and worked as a professor in the chemistry department.

In 1928, he began to study medicine from Harvard Medical School. He met his mentor, Dr. Arthur Allen, here. In second year, he did his first internship at the Boston City Hospital. In third year, he worked as a resident at Huntington Hospital. In fourth year, he went back to Boston City Hospital.

He graduated magna cum laude from Harvard Medical School in four years, in 1932.

== Career ==
Welch began an internship at Massachusetts General Hospital (MGH) after medical school. He worked as an assistant to Dr. Arthur Allen. Following the end of his residency, Allen offered Welch a five-year position as his assistant.

It is worth noting that Welch was not certified to practice surgery until 1939 – seven years after he graduated medical school. This is because the American Board of Surgery did not exist until 1937. Welch was the 101st surgeon to be certified by this board. Before the 1930s, there had been little oversight of the medical community, but that began to change as the 20th century progressed. Many more regulations would come some of which Welch would have a role in forming.

=== During second world war ===
On May 15, 1942, Welch joined the United States Army Medical Corps as a captain. He left behind one son (Claude E. Welch Jr. born June 12, 1939) and a pregnant wife, as well as his job at the Massachusetts General Hospital. He wanted to serve his country in its time of need. He departed Boston with 123 other surgeons, physicians, and nurses from the Massachusetts General Hospital to Camp Blanding, Florida for training. Together they helped to constitute the 6th General Hospital.

In January 1943, the 6th General Hospital was deployed to North Africa. While there, he and his colleagues discovered that many lessons learned in previous conflicts could not be applied. This was because some medical treatments used in prior conflicts were simply not effective for the different situations that World War II presented. For example:

"A lesson taught from World War I was that abdominal injuries should be treated by emergency laparotomy. General Ogilvie, in charge of the British Armed Forces based in the eastern desert of North Africa, found that his wounded patients had to be transported by ambulance or truck for long distances after emergency operations. Under those conditions, wounds of the colon that had been closed by suture did very poorly. Colostomies were ordered for all colon wounds. This practice proved to be a very important advance, although we now know that wounds in civilian life can be treated far differently."

In the spring of 1943, Welch was assigned to one of the general hospitals close to the front lines in Rome. At this hospital, there were often more than 150 surgeries a day.

Welch stayed at the front lines until the war ended in 1945. His service in World War II was a significant part of his life for not only did he learn many important medical lessons, but he formed friendships that would last a lifetime. In his autobiography, he summarized the impact of the war using a quote from Colonel Washburn:

"Horrible as War is, there are by-products of value. Lifetime friendships are formed. Men who have campaigned together know one another thoroughly. Fine traits of character are brought out, and in contrast the less admirable ones fail of concealment. Men learn the relative importance of things. A man who has parted from his home and risked his life has learned the comparative unimportance’s of social position and riches. He values accomplishment, service to others, his home life, his chance to raise a family in comfort and security."

While serving in the army, he rose to the rank of lieutenant colonel.

=== Resuming work as a surgeon ===
After the war, Welch returned to the Massachusetts Hospital Hospital. Two of the more important developments in surgery advanced by Welch included the development of a safe method of performing a catheter duodenostomy and performing the first replacement of an artery with a vein graft at Massachusetts General Hospital.

In the early 20th century, performing a duodenostomy was considered unsafe. Indeed, one surgeon who had attempted to perform the operation had a 100 percent death rate. Welch studied notes from the surgeon and determined that he had used "so large a drainage tube that an enormous duodenal fistula resulted through the tube and the patients died of electrolyte imbalance." Therefore, in the late 1930s, when a patient came with an inflamed duodenum, Welch used a new method which he had been developing, that is, he used a catheter to close the duodenal stump. The operation was a success. Following his success, he made an effort to find out if any similar procedures had been used by surgeons. After discovering two other surgeons who had used a similar technique, Welch reported this new method of performing a duodenostomy to the Journal of the American Medical Association (JAMA) in 1949.

In the early 1940s, the only acceptable way to treat a severed artery was ligation. It was thought that this would prevent gangrene – although it rarely did. After seeing the results of a failed ligation, Welch wanted to try something different. An opportunity presented itself when a man was brought in with a dislocated knee and damaged popliteal artery. Welch performed an artery graft and the leg immediately regained life.

Scientist and US senator Harrison Schmitt and Pope John Paul II were some of his famous patients.

=== Academic ties ===
Welch undertook various teaching responsibilities and served on school committees at Harvard Medical School. One committee – of which he was the chairman of – was dedicated to the examination of continuing medical education. In his role as chairman, he helped to institute postgraduate courses in cancer and gastrointestinal surgery. Welch "viewed his contributions to education as second only to his role in improving patient care."

Welch published multiple articles in the New England Journal of Medicine. These articles included surveys of recent developments in abdominal surgery. These surveys had originally started with Dr. Allen, but Welch picked them up as Dr. Allen's health began to deteriorate in the 1950s. Apart from abdominal surgery, he wrote articles on cancer surgery, medical ethics, and thoughts on malpractice. Welch became a member of the Committee of Publications of the Massachusetts Medical Society (MMS) in 1962. He became the chairman in 1969 and served until 1980.

=== Involvement with medical associations ===
In 1965, Welch became the president of the Massachusetts Medical Society and was elected to as a delegate from the state of Massachusetts at the American Medical Association (AMA). He remained a delegate for a decade during which Welch dealt with racial inequality. In 1975, he ran for the president of AMA position and lost to Carl Hoffman. During his bid, Welch pressed for "professional standards review organizations" and chaired an AMA committee that drew up "model criteria for patient care." In 1977, he was one of the two nominees to receive the Distinguished Service Award of the AMA.

Welch was also a part of the American College of Surgeons (ACS). Welch's involvement with the ACS began in 1939, partly due to Dr. Allen's association with the organization. Until 1960, his involvement was limited to presenting papers and attending annual meetings. In 1973, he was elected as its president. He was also elected as the president of the American Surgical Association (ASA). Allegations by the Federal Trade Commission about trade restrictions and medical malpractice suits arose during Welch's term in office.

As the president of the ASA, he also served as the chairman on the Massachusetts Board of Registration and Discipline in Medicine for the state of Massachusetts. During his time as chairman, the board ruled that "physician’s could not refuse to treat welfare patients just because they were on Medicaid, that women were entitled to full information about the alternative treatments for breast cancer, and that continuing medical education be required for licensure." In addition to creating new safety regulations and punishing those physicians that did not follow these regulations, the Board also forged important bonds between the medical community and the government.

== Publications ==
Welch wrote more than 200 articles and chapters, and he authored or edited six books. Topics include breast cancer, subtotal gastroenterology for duodenal ulcer, prophylactic surgery for colorectal cancer, history of Canadian surgery, diverticulitis of the colon, resectability and survival in stomach cancer, and guidelines for continuum of care. In addition to his research, Welch addressed social issues and the future of the medical profession. He discussed diverse topics such as quality of care, teaching of surgery in medical schools, and the surgical fee system.

Published books include Intestinal Obstruction, Surgery of the Stomach & Duodenum also published in Spanish, Polypoid Lesions of the Gastrointestinal Tract, and Manual of Lower Gastrointestinal Surgery co-authored with his son John P. Welch and Leslie W. Ottinger and also published in German. Claude Welch's final book was titled A Twentieth Century Surgeon: My Life in the Massachusetts General Hospital. These titles highlight not only Welch's awareness and knowledge of the broad aspects surrounding GI and oncologic surgery, but also of medical economics and organizations.

In 1992, Welch's autobiography was published. A review by William Longmire and H. Kim Lyerly put it succinctly: "Claude has recorded not only a sketch of Boston and the Massachusetts General Hospital and Staff, but a much broader chronicle of 20th century medicine and contemporary thought; as well as a glimpse of life during this period, with penetrating comments on current health care problems as viewed through the eyes of a most thoughtful, experience, and observant scribe"

== Recognition ==
- The Distinguished Service Award from the AMA in 1979, which honors contributions to the achievement of the ideals of American medicine by aid and cooperation in the advancement of medical science, medical education, or medical care.
- The Bigelow Medal Award from the Boston Surgical Society in 1986, which honors achievement in general surgery.
- The Trustees Medal Award by the MGH in 1991, which "honors those American physicians and scientists whose lifetime contributions have uniquely benefited humankind, particularly through the advancement of medical care and practice."

== Personal life ==
In 1933, Welch met Phyllis Paton at the Massachusetts General Hospital where she was working as a student nurse. They married on August 14, 1937. They had two sons, Claude E. Welch Jr., professor emeritus of political science at University at Buffalo and John Paton Welch, a retired surgeon, of Hartford, Connecticut; and seven grandchildren.

== Death ==
Claude E. Welch died on March 9, 1996. He was survived by his wife Phyllis; two sons, and seven grandchildren.

His legacy includes the Claude E. Welch Research and Education Fund, the endowed Claude E. Welch fellowship for residents interested to pursue medical research, and the Claude E. Welch Chair of surgery at Harvard Medical School.
