= Claude E. Welch Jr. =

American professor of political science (retired)

Claude Emerson Welch Jr., State University of New York (SUNY) at Buffalo (UB) Professor of Political Science and SUNY Distinguished Service Professor of Political Science, was born on 12 June 1939 in Boston, Massachusetts, to Dr. Claude E. Welch, Sr., and Phyllis Paton Welch. The younger Welch "had the values of hard work and respect for others instilled him from an early age." His father worked his way through Harvard Medical School and served as a front-line surgeon in World War II. In his medical career, he became "a fixture at Massachusetts General Hospital for more than 40 years, was an innovative surgeon, a tireless worker, prolific researcher and an advocate of building strong ties with his patients, themes that would come to be synonymous with his...son."

Welch had four children with his late wife Nancy, who died in 1979. His son is Chris Welch, and his three daughters are Sarah Welch, Martha Dyer, and the late Elisabeth Ann (Lisa) Welch, who died in an alpine accident in September 2017. The Welch family maintains a camp on Lake Winnipesaukee in New Hampshire. In May 2020, Welch moved to Auburndale, Massachusetts, a suburb of Boston.

In 1981, Welch married Jeannette Marie Ludwig (September 29, 1949 – July 29, 2018), who was also a professor at UB. Welch and Ludwig divided their time between their homes in Amherst and the Chautauqua Institution. They donated their home to the Chautauqua Foundation and are members of the Eleanor B. Daugherty Society.

Welch's scope of interest extends globally. He and Ludwig traveled to more than 25 countries on five continents. They became avid photographers, and their collection of more than 2000 images, complete with detailed descriptions, is preserved in the digital collection of the University at Buffalo Libraries. Based on these images, the library maintains an exhibition titled Wayfarers: Selected Images from the Welch-Ludwig Collection . Welch and Ludwig also created a scholarship for students studying abroad, the Welch-Ludwig Fund for International Study.

== Education ==
Welch attended private schools from fifth grade on. He went to Belmont Hill School, Belmont, Massachusetts, where he received academic awards for Biology, French, Latin, and general scholarly excellence. In his senior year, Welch received the Headmaster's Award for Outstanding Student and graduated summa cum laude.

Welch was admitted to Harvard College, the undergraduate liberal arts college of Harvard University, in 1957 at age 18, graduated magna cum laude, and was elected to Phi Beta Kappa. He was elected President of The Harvard Crimson in 1960. Responding to the political upheaval in Africa where countries were fighting for independence, Welch focused his studies on Africa and human rights. His undergraduate honors thesis examined the impact of international law on South Africa's administration of South-West Africa (now Namibia) from the end of World War I to 1961.

Continuing with postgraduate studies at Oxford University, Welch earned his PhD in 1964. In an interview with UB Honors Today, UB's honors alumnae magazine, he explained that he did his dissertation research in West Africa, wrote the final draft on location, and mailed it to his committee. His interest in African politics and human rights formed the basis for his career.

== Teaching career ==
For more than 50 years, Welch taught political science at UB and lived in Amherst, New York, a suburb of Buffalo, New York. In 1964, Welch accepted a position in the political science department at the University at Buffalo, the largest and most comprehensive campus within the SUNY system. He rose rapidly in the academic ranks, serving as assistant professor from 1964 to 1968, associate professor from 1968 to 1972, full professor from 1972 to 1989, and as SUNY Distinguished Service Professor until his retirement in 2017. He was selected one of nine faculty members from the SUNY system to serve on the university-wide Advisory Council on Distinguished Service Professorships, 2009–12. His international teaching included a semester at the Singapore Institute of Management and part of a summer course at the International Institute of Human Rights, Strasbourg, France.

Welch became a mentor and renowned professor and took an active role in graduate as well as undergraduate education. His warm and enthusiastic personality and his intellect created an environment in which students explored the issues of the day, and his involvement in university activities demonstrated his devotion and attention to his students and their regard for him. In 2016 Welch received the President's Medal at the University at Buffalo, given "in recognition of signal and extraordinary service to UB." The citation praised his "major contributions to the development of, or quality of life within, the University."

Welch's teaching responsibilities included African politics, civil-military relations, human rights, international law, political change, and world civilizations since 1500. He directed independent study and thesis and dissertation guidance. Since 1969, he participated in about 60 dissertation committees, chairing more than 30 of them, and he served as an outside reader for other departments at UB as well as other universities, for example, in Canada and South Africa. In addition, Welch taught at the Global Perspectives Academy and presented special seminars for the University Honors Program: Africa through Novels and Films, International Human Rights, and Women's and Men's Language (with Jeannette Ludwig).

Welch took special pride in teaching. In 2015, he told UB Honors Today that his teaching philosophy is "Let each become what they are capable of being. I try to build up a sense that, yes, individuals have made a difference, and you can do so, too. One of the objectives I see in my teaching is empowerment of students through knowledge, but also through a sense that they can be inspired by learning about others."

Welch's academic interests focus broadly on political transitions, particularly in developing countries, most notably in Africa. Welch published 14 books that demonstrate his expertise in African politics, civil-military relations, and human rights. Protecting Human Rights in Africa: Strategies and Roles of Non-Governmental Organizations (2001) and Human Rights and Development in Africa (1984) were selected by Choice: Current Reviews for Academic Libraries for its list of Outstanding Academic Title. Choice is published by the Association of College and Research Libraries, the higher education division of the American Library Association. Protecting Human Rights in Africa was also short listed by the African Studies Association for the Herskovits Prize. In 2008, Economic Rights in Canada and the United States (co-authored with Rhoda Howard-Hassmann) was named by the US Human Rights Network, as "one of three 'notable contributions' in the field of human rights scholarship by our membership."

== Administrative career ==
Welch served in numerous administrative positions while maintaining his teaching and research. His first major appointment came in 1967 when, at the age of 28, he became dean of the Division of Undergraduate Education at UB. He served in this position from 1967 to 1970. As associate vice president for Academic Affairs in 1976–80, Welch worked as the number two person for non-health sciences-related matters. He also served a three-year term as chair of the Political Science Department, 1980–83. He was Acting Dean of the Colleges from 1978 to 1979; co director of the annual Faculty Development Workshop, 1984–91; and co director of the Program for Tenured Faculty, 1987–89.

The Faculty Senate elected Welch chair for 1985–87 and 1995–97. He also served UB by chairing Faculty Senate committees on Budget Priorities, Governance, Academic Planning, Public Service, Student Affairs, and Teaching Effectiveness. In addition, Welch chaired the Committee on Public Service, the Nominating Committee, the Committee on Student Affairs, and the Special Committee on Academic Integrity. At the Baldy Center for Law & Social Policy (SUNY Buffalo Law School), he was a member of Advisory Committee, the Gilbert Moore Fellowships Committee, and the Working Groups Committee. Welch chaired the Council on International Studies and World Affairs from 1998 to 2000, has been a member since 1966, and served on the Task Force on International Programs, 1981–83.

He chaired the President's Review Board on Appointments, Promotions, and Tenure for three years and served three-year terms on two other occasions. From 2009 to 2011, Welch sat on UB's General Education Task Force and was appointed by the provost as a contributor to the new implementation and development of the restructuring of the university's general education requirements. In 2008, UB President John B. Simpson appointed Welch to the Campaign Advisory Group as one of three faculty members on a 15-person team to help improve fundraising efforts. He also served as the president of the Omicron Chapter of Phi Beta Kappa (1971–93) and subsequently served on the Elections Committee.

== Editorial and advisory activities ==
Welch sat on several editorial committees and advised university presses. Since 1993 he has been on the editorial review board of Human Rights Quarterly. From 1980 to 1988, he was associate editor for Armed Forces & Society, serving as editor from 1988 to 1992 and on their board of editors from 1992 to the present. Welch was subject editor for "Armed Forces and Society" in the International Military and Defense Encyclopedia.

Welch has served on the editorial board of advisors for several publications, including Buffalo Human Rights Law Review since 1997; advisory board, World History Since 1500 (Dushkin Publishers), 1997–2005; editorial advisory board, Encyclopedia Americana, 1992–03; and the board of editors, African Studies Review, 1974–81.

He reviewed book manuscripts for Princeton University Press, Pearson/Prentice-Hall, Houghton Mifflin, SUNY Press, University of Pennsylvania Press, University of Rochester Press, University of Nebraska Press, Pennsylvania State University Press, and Kumarian Press. He evaluated article manuscripts for Armed Forces & Society, African Studies Review, Journal of Developing Areas, and Journal of Modern African Studies and grant proposals for the National Endowment for the Humanities, the National Science Foundation, the United States Institute of Peace, and the Fulbright program. He also was Fellowship evaluator for the Fulbright Commission Council on International Education Services.

In addition, Welch was promotion evaluator for University of Virginia; Johns Hopkins University; University of California, Riverside; University of Southern California; University of Vermont; Dartmouth College; Southern Illinois University; Miami University of Ohio; University of South Carolina; and the University of Zambia, among others. He was on the academic advisory committee for graduate programs at the U.S. Army Command and General Staff College, Fort Leavenworth, Kansas, 1999–2004.

== Impact ==
In his 50-plus years teaching at UB, Professor Welch impacted both campus life and individual students. About his early years teaching, Welch told UB Honors Today, "I started out really scared teaching. I remember being dressed formally—because that was the way in 1964—and I'd come back with chalk dust on my shoulders from rubbing up against the board. I was sort of backing away." However, he quickly adjusted to the environment of university life and "as he began teaching honors seminars in the late 1980s, he realized he could utilize some of the principles of those smaller classes—such as debate and classroom discussion—and apply them to what had typically been larger, lecture-based classes." Welch continues, "That's contemporary learning. That's how advances occur. It's not now the image of the lone scholar locked in a garret somewhere. Yes, you can have brilliant thought experiments. You can be like Einstein in the patent office, totally bored and a failure in math in high school. But for the overwhelming bulk of us that are a couple of standard deviations below in terms of intelligence, you've got to work collaboratively."

Welch's interests took him far beyond the campus and classroom. He believes in living a life of integrity. He told UB Honors Today, "I try to be a role model for how to live. Have a relationship that is stable and loving. Be part of a community and help to make it a better community. Be generous with time and treasure. These are clichés, but you have to live them."

The article published in UB Honors Today describes the influence Welch had on his students, prompting many of them to pursue graduate degrees in political science. "Halfway around the world, you'll find former Welch-inspired scholars... Jori Breslawski (Honors Scholar, Class of 2014) was already an international studies major...but her specialization changed after taking Welch's Human Rights course. 'That was one of the pivotal moments in my life.... It completely changed how I saw the world. He taught in such a way that you couldn't ignore what he was talking about. I would leave class crying and wouldn't be able to get it out of my mind the rest of the day.'"

Welch's major academic impact came through his analyses of the effectiveness of human rights nongovernmental organizations (NGOs), explored in his 2001 publication, NGOs and Human Rights: Promise and Performance. He argued, particularly in his 2001 book Protecting Human Rights in Africa, that NGOs have become central to the promotion and protection of human rights.

His recent research involves the effectiveness of human rights NGOs; he demonstrates that in key parts of civil society, NGOs have become central to the promotion and protection of human rights. His last major volume on this topic, tentatively titled Protecting Human Rights Globally: Strategies and Roles of International NGOs, remains unfinished as of this writing. It examines the impact of lesser known international nongovernmental organizations (INGO) such as Anti-Slavery International, the World Council of Churches, a variety of entities concerned with discrimination on the basis of descent (in particular, caste) and the Coalition for the International Criminal Court. These INGOs focus on major ongoing human rights issues, notably contemporary slavery, racism, discrimination based on descent, and impunity from prosecution for major human rights abuses. Initial drafts of three chapters had been published in Human Rights Quarterly as of summer 2017.

in 2021, SUNY's Department of Political Science honored Welch with a ceremony naming the department library and conference room for him. In addition, the department annually recognizes the best graduate research papers with an award named for Welch

== Overseas travel, research, and appointments ==
Given his specialization in comparative politics, Welch carried out much of his research outside the United States. He traveled as well to enhance his teaching, learn about cultures, and satisfy his curiosity. Countries he visited include Brazil, Cameroon, Egypt, Ethiopia, France, Gambia, Ghana, Germany, Great Britain, Kenya, Lesotho, Namibia, Nigeria, Norway, People's Republic of China, Philippines, Russia, Senegal, South Africa, South Korea, Spain, Sweden, Switzerland, Taiwan, Togo, Tunisia, and Zimbabwe.

Welch's main geographic interest remained with Africa. One of his early appointments was chairman of the UNESCO Evaluation Commission, Alvin Ikoku College of Education in Owerri, Nigeria, in January 1977. Later, Welch sat on the Advisory Committee for the African Centre for Democracy and Human Rights Studies, Banjul, Gambia, from 1993 to 2005 and the Advisory Committee for the Africa Division of Human Rights Watch from 1989 to 2009. He attended seminars organized by the Africa Center for Strategic Studies, held in Burundi, Benin, and Botswana. These seminars focused on improving democratization efforts in Africa, particularly relating to armed forces.

== Scholarly contributions ==
Welch's 14 books and many published articles address three interdisciplinary areas: Africa, the political roles of armed forces (civil–military relations), and human rights. Among his most important volumes, already mentioned, are Human Rights and Development in Africa, Protecting Human Rights in Africa, and Economic Rights in Canada and the United States. Although the three areas interrelate, Welch's titles can be listed among his three focus areas. In the interest of avoiding duplication, several volumes that overlap are mentioned only in the area most prevalent.

=== Books focused partly or wholly on Africa ===
Welch's first book, Dream of Unity: Pan-Africanism and Political Unification in West Africa, (1966) drew from his doctoral dissertation. It documented, through four case studies, the obstacles to greater unity among African countries with divergent colonial backgrounds. Henry L. Bretton from the University of Michigan reviewed the book in 1967, praising Welch for his focus on West Africa instead of the broader emphasis of Africa as a whole that many books of the time were concerned with. "Professor Welch's meticulous scholarship, applied to West Africa only, has produced the kind of book required for better understanding of the substance of international relations."

Welch's Soldier and State in Africa (1970) was one of the first comparative analyses of causes of coup d'état in Africa. It included Welch's framework, followed by original chapters from other specialists. Welch also drew upon his African expertise in Peasants in Africa, co-edited with Alan K. Smith. This book inquired whether the concept of "peasant" would be useful in the sub-Saharan context).

Human Rights and Development in Africa (1984) co-edited with Ronald Meltzer, examined the emergent "Right to Development". As mentioned above, it was selected by Choice, as one of the Outstanding Academic Books of 1984.

=== Books focused on civil-military relations ===
Welch co-wrote Military Role and Rule (1974) with Arthur K. Smith. The book developed a general framework of explanation for coups d'état and their consequences. The authors prepared detailed studies of Thailand, Nigeria, Peru, Egypt, and France. In a review published in The Journal of Politics, Mary B. Welfing wrote, "Welch and Smith synthesize the extensive literature on the military in politics."

Welch returned to similar themes in 1976 in an edited volume, Civilian Control of the Military: Theory and Cases from Developing Countries. Many of the original essays were presented at a conference Welch organized. He followed this up with his single-authored No Farewell to Arms? Military Disengagement from Politics in Africa and Latin America (1987). This volume examines problems of ensuring effective returns to the barracks of armed forces following coups d'état in three West African countries (Ghana, Nigeria, and Côte d'Ivoire) and three Andean states (Bolivia, Colombia, and Peru). The Journal Armed Forces & Society describes the book as a "welcome scholarly contribution that enhances our understanding of the intricacies of voluntary military disengagement from politics." Military Review adds, "In this book, the contributors look at the issue of civilian control of the military from a comparative viewpoint...where the civilian government appears to be in control of the military, looking for some underlying principles which allowed that control to develop.... The thrust of the book is to tell not why civilian regimes fail, but why some succeed." In the Journal of Interamerican Studies and World Affairs, David Pion-Berlin describes Welch's "timely, much-needed comparative study of military withdrawal from power.... Disengagement, [Welch] posits, is conditioned by institutional variables such as role perceptions, budgetary allotments, and military missions and deployment, and broader political variables such as levels of domestic conflict, economic trends, and political leadership."

Welch's single-authored Anatomy of Rebellion (1980) provides a detailed examination and comparison of four large-scale peasant uprisings in Africa and Asia to determine whether they were "failed revolutions" or large-scale "rebellions". Along the same line, he edited two books of previously published readings, Political Modernization: Readings in Comparative Political Change (1967; second edition 1971) and Revolution and Political Change (1972), co-edited with Mavis Bunker Taintor.

In 1967, Welch's Modernization: Readings in Comparative Political Change emphasized comparative aspects of political modernization. In Developmental Change: An Annotated Bibliography, Allan A. Spitz draws three conclusions from Welch's thesis: "(1) modernization is complex and results in a fundamental transformation of society, economy, and polity; (2) modernization is not guaranteed—it is subject to disruption; and (3) it cannot be assumed that the wide-ranging changes will occur peacefully" (p. 141).

=== Books focused on human rights ===
Welch's best-known work, Protecting Human Rights in Africa, was pioneering and the first comparative analysis of the development and impact of grassroots human rights organizations south of the Sahara. It was selected by Choice as one of the outstanding academic books of 1995 and short listed that year by the African Studies Association for the Herskovits Prize for the best book in African studies. Protecting Human Rights in Africa received outstanding reviews due to its revolutionary nature. Foreign Affairs quoted it as "a wise, nuanced, and copiously referenced study for practitioners and donors as well as academic analysts" and the Journal of Southern African Studies described it as "one of the best books of its kind."

In NGOs and Human Rights: Promise and Performance (2001), Welch commissioned 15 original chapters to use as case studies to form a framework that compares and contrasts ways in which non-governmental human rights organizations have developed their goals, determined their effectiveness, and adopted and adapted their strategies. The volume addresses how these factors influence NGOs' effectiveness. Among the organizations examined are Amnesty International, Human Rights Watch, the International Commission of Jurists, the Ford Foundation, and development-oriented NGOs.

Asian Perspectives on Human Rights (1990), co-edited with Virginia Leary, combined original case studies of individual Asian countries with a synthesizing introduction. The volume contains original papers presented at conferences that were organized by Welch and Leary. In collaboration with Rhoda Howard-Hassmann, Welch published Economic Rights in Canada and the United States, which examined similarities and contrasts between the two countries in areas such as the right to health care, social welfare and racism, disability rights, and others. This volume was based on original papers commissioned by Professors Howard-Hassmann and Welch with funding from various sources.

=== Other publications ===
In addition to the volumes above, Welch contributed 39 chapters to scholarly books; 41 articles for refereed journals and 27 articles for non-refereed journals; nine encyclopedia entries; six monographs and consultant's reports; 20 unpublished conference presentations; and nine invited and professional addresses. He won 32 research, symposium, and internship grants and six university research grants. In addition, Welch reviewed grant applications for the National Science Foundation, the John D. and Catherine T. MacArthur Foundation, the Grawemeyer Foundation, and the United States Institute of Peace.

== Community activities ==
Through his career, Welch has supported community life in Western New York, becoming a well-known civic figure and supporter of human rights causes. He served as president of the Buffalo Council on World Affairs from 1997 to 1999 and helped to establish Buffalo-Niagara World Connect. He served on the board of directors for the Harvard Club of Western New York (1998–2001) and the African American Cultural Center of Buffalo. Welch also belonged to the Pundit Club of Buffalo, a men's literary and social group.

Welch's participation in the Buffalo religious community has given him recognition in more than just the academic circles in the city. At Westminster Presbyterian Church, Welch has served as a Ruling Elder, chairman of the Management Group, chair of the Adult Program Committee, and chair of the Investment Policy Committee.

He also participated in the Amherst Community Church, serving on the Board of Directors, Board of Trustees, and the Music Committee. In 1972, he served as a reporter on religion and ethics for WBEN-TV (now WIVB-TV) as part of his volunteer work for the Buffalo Council of Churches. In 2000, he received the first Claude E. Welch Jr. award for outstanding voluntarism on behalf of the Buffalo Council on World Affairs (now Buffalo-Niagara WorldConnect), 2000.

Welch was vice president of CAUSE (Coalition for Action, Unity, and Social Equality), 1970–71; secretary of the Buffalo-area branch of American Civil Liberties Union, 1972–74; served on the board of directors of the African American Cultural Center of Buffalo, 1967–74; and for several years as a lecturer for in service courses given for secondary school teachers in Williamsville, Niagara Falls, Hamburg, Lockport, Cheektowaga, and Buffalo. He currently gives lectures at senior citizen centers in Erie County, New York.

An enthusiastic bike rider and environmentalist, he was involved in the Bicycle and Pedestrian Subcommittee, Pedal Power and BIKE-WNY (Bicyclists Intent on Kinder Environments of Western New York), serving as editor of Pedal Power from 1990 to 1994.

On the national front, Welch was a participant in "One America: Conversations that Bring Us Together," sponsored by the White House Initiative on Race, 1999, and was featured on national television programs. He was highlighted on CBS Sunday Morning during a February 16, 2014, episode dedicated to celebrating the presidency of Millard Fillmore. Welch participated in and was a one-day champion in the television program "Jeopardy" along with competitors Mike Stafford and Nancy Neff, which aired as the 23rd episode of the 1987 season.

== Major awards ==
Welch has received many awards and distinctions over the years. He received the SUNY Chancellor's Award for Excellence in Teaching (1974) and the UB President's Medal (2016). He was promoted to the rank of SUNY Distinguished Professor in 1989, and in 1992, he received the Distinguished Faculty Award from the University Libraries. According to an article in the newsletter Library News, Welch received the award, as well as a Bison wristwatch, as the "Faculty Member Most Helpful to the Libraries over the Past Year." He was named one of University at Buffalo's "Top Ten" professors by the campus newspaper, The Spectrum, in 2012.

At the national level, Welch received three lifetime achievement awards. The first came jointly from TIAA and the SUNY Research Foundation in 2006, the first time this recognition was given. The award was established to recognize individuals "who serve those who serve others for the greater good." In 2014, the American Political Science Association presented a Distinguished Scholar award to Welch for his work in human rights. The International Studies Association gave him its Human Rights Distinguished Scholar Award for 2014–15.
