= Donald Trunkey =

American trauma surgeon (1937–2019)

Don Trunkey
- Born: June 23, 1937; Oakesdale, Washington
- Died: May 1, 2019 (aged 81); Post Falls, Idaho
- Education: Washington State College; University of Washington
- Spouse: Jane Mary Henry (m. 1958)
- Children: 2
- Medical career
- Profession: Surgeon
- Field: Trauma
- Institutions: University of California, San Francisco; Oregon Health & Science University
- Sub-specialties: Zoology

Donald Dean Trunkey (23 June 1937 – 1 May 2019) was an American trauma surgeon.

== Early life ==
Trunkey was born in 1937 in Washington State. He received a BS in Zoology from Washington State College, where he also played basketball and because of alphabetical sorting was the last person to graduate before the school changed its name to Washington State University in 1959.

== Medical education ==
He then went to the University of Washington for Medical School and graduated in 1963. He interned under J. Englebert Dunphy at the University of Oregon Medical School, who became his mentor and turned his focus to surgery. He was then drafted into the army and served two years in Germany. He completed his surgical training at UCSF and became a faculty member in 1972. As a UCSF faculty member, he was the leader of the trauma service at San Francisco General Hospital. His experience as an academic trauma surgeon led to his authorship of a popular textbook on trauma care in 1983. In 1986 he became the Chief of Surgery at Oregon Health & Science University. In 2018 he retired to Idaho.

== Writings ==
Trunkey has authored 174 journal articles, 25 books, and about 200 book chapters. In 1978 he starred in an episode of Lifeline on NBC.

"The critical moment in Don Trunkey's career was when he published a paper in 1979 on death rates of trauma patients in Orange County (Calif.), compared to those in San Francisco County," said Richard Mullins, MD, Professor, Department of Surgery. "That paper was a bombshell. It was one of the earliest, most persuasive pieces of evidence on the effectiveness of trauma centers." Trunkey was, more than any other single person, responsible for the development of sophisticated, state-of-the-art trauma programs in the U.S.

== Awards ==
In 2008 he received the King Faisal prize in medicine for his research improving trauma care. He has many other awards including Distinguished Service Award of the American College of Surgeons, Washington State University College of Science Distinguished Alumnus Award, Barry Goldwater Service Award, International Society of Surgery Prize, Honorary Membership of the British Association for Accident and Emergency Medicine and Honorary Fellowships of the Royal Colleges of Surgeons of England, Ireland, Edinburgh, Glasgow, South Africa and Brazil, Medal of the Royal College of Medicine of England and Honorary Professorship of the Royal College of Surgeons of Edinburgh. In 2018 he received the Icons in Surgery award.

== Death ==
Trunkey died in Post Falls, Idaho on 1 May 2019, at the age of 81.
