= James S. Economou =

American physician (born 1951)

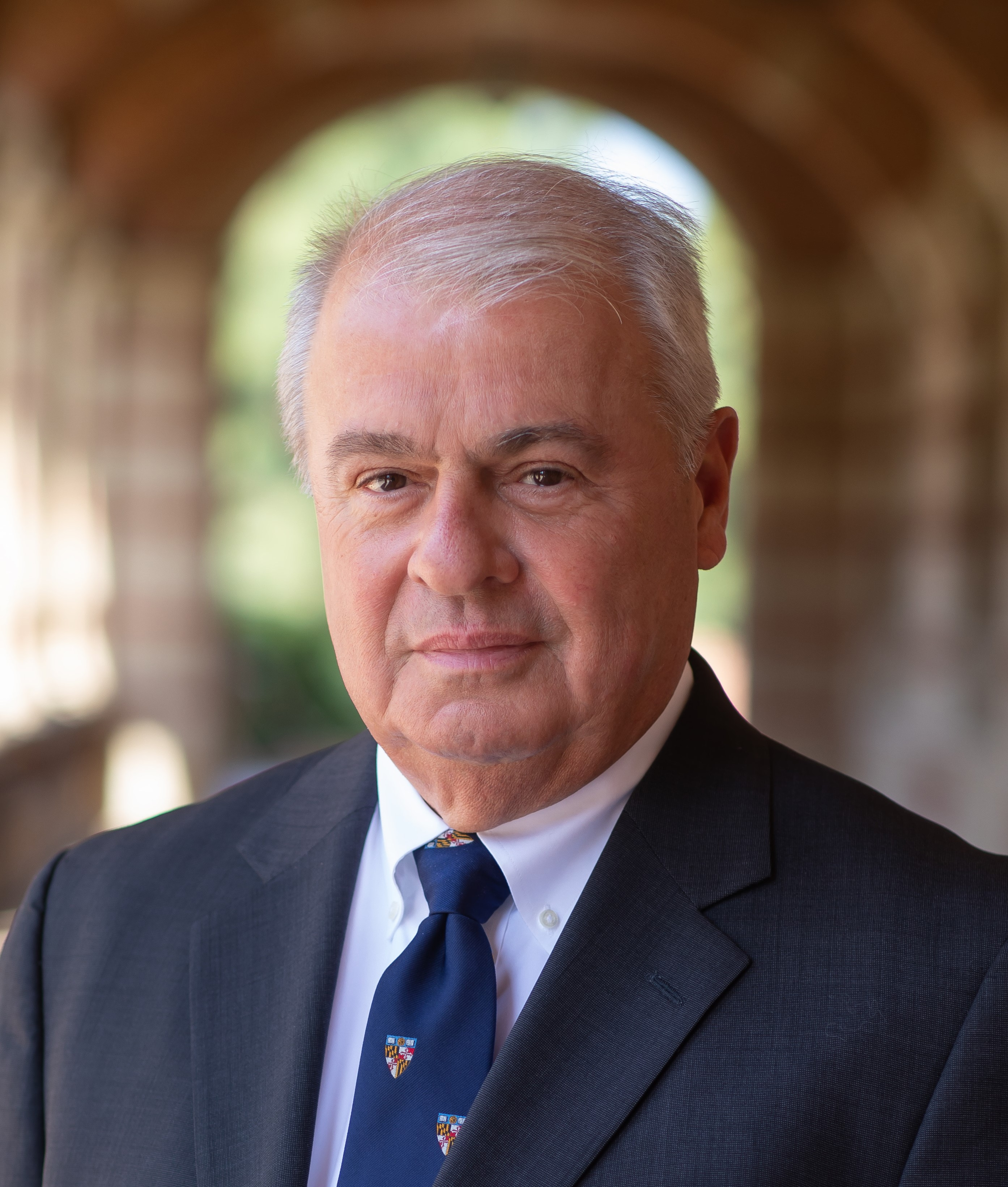
- Born: November 7, 1951 (age 74)
- Education: Johns Hopkins University
- Occupations: Surgical oncologist, tumor immunologist, UCLA Vice Chancellor For Research

James S. Economou is an American physician-scientist on the faculty of the University of California, Los Angeles (UCLA) where he is also a surgical oncologist and tumor immunologist. He was Vice Chancellor for Research at UCLA (2010-2015) where he promoted academic entrepreneurship, transdisciplinary research, and support of the humanities, arts, and social sciences. The UCLA research enterprise generates almost one billion dollars in extramural funds annually.

== Early life and education ==
Economou was born in 1951 in Evanston, Illinois and is the grandson of Greek immigrants. He graduated from New Trier West High School (Northfield, IL), received his BA ('72) and M.D./Ph.D. ('80) from The Johns Hopkins University and trained in general surgery at University of California, San Francisco (UCSF). He joined UCLA faculty in 1986, where he has remained for his entire professional career.

James is the son of the late Steven Economou, MD, and Kathryn Dotska Economou.

== Career ==
Economou is the Beaumont Distinguished Professor of Surgery, Distinguished Professor of Microbiology, Immunology and Molecular Genetics and Distinguished Professor of Molecular and Medical Pharmacology at UCLA.

With Arie Belldegrun, he led the first gene therapy trial on the West Coast in the early 1990s and was the founding director of the UCLA Human Gene Medicine Program. He served as Chief of the UCLA Division of Surgical Oncology (2000-2017) and was the 65th President of the Society of Surgical Oncology. He has also served as a founding member of the Los Angeles Zoo Medical Advisory Board and has operated on a male silverback lowlands gorilla with a large parotid tumor, a Borneo orangutan with a laryngeal sac infection and a single-horned Indian white rhinoceros with cancer.

He served for 8 years as Deputy Director of the UCLA Jonsson Comprehensive Cancer Center. He has chaired two National Cancer Institute Study Sections, and was continuously NIH funded for 30 years on the UCLA faculty. He received the Stop Cancer Richard Barasch Seed Grant Award (1999), the James Ewing Medal from the Society of Surgical Oncology (2006), and the Flance-Karl Award from the American Surgical Association (2013). In 2015, he became the 134th President of the American Surgical Association, the nation's oldest and most prestigious surgical society.

Economou’s research interests in tumor immunology include dendritic cell vaccination, DNA vaccines and adoptive cell therapy using genetically engineered T cells. Economou has served on the Editorial Boards for the American Journal of Surgery, Surgery, the World Journal of Surgery and the Journal of the American College of Surgeons. He has published more than 100 research articles and book chapters. As Vice Chancellor of Research at [UCLA] Economou promoted a culture of entrepreneurship, diversity, and transdisciplinary scholarship and research.

Economou is a co-founder of Kite Pharma, a biotechnology company focused on the design and development of immune-based targeted therapies for multiple cancer indications. On June 6, 2014, Kite Pharma announced it had entered into an exclusive, worldwide license with the National Institutes of Health (NIH). Kite Pharma had a successful public offering on June 20, 2014.

== Selected publications ==
- Butterfield, L.H.; Jilani, S.; Chakraborty, N.G.; Bui, L.A.; Ribas, A.; Dissette, V.; Lau, R.; Gamradt, S.; Glaspy, J.A.; McBride, W.H.; Mukherji, B.; Economou, J.S. (1998). "Generation of melanoma-specific cytotoxic T lymphocytes by dendritic cells transduced with a MART-1 adenovirus". Journal of Immunology. 161 (10): 5607–5613. doi:10.4049/jimmunol.161.10.5607. PMID 9820539. S2CID 24302039.
- Butterfield, L.H.; Meng, W.; Koh, A.; Vollmer, C.M.; Ribas, A. Dissette; Faull, K.; Glaspy, J.A.; McBride, W.H.; Economou, J.S. (2001). "T cell responses to HLA-A*0201-restricted peptides derived from human alpha fetoprotein". Journal of Immunology. 166 (8): 5300–5308. doi:10.4049/jimmunol.166.8.5300. PMID 11290817.
- Ma, C.; Cheung, A.F.; Chodon, T.; Koya, R.C.; Wu, Z.; Ng, C.; Avramis, E.; Cochran, A.J.; Witte, O.N.; Baltimore, D.; Chmielowski, B.; Economou, J.S.; Comin-Anduix, B.; Ribas, A.; Heath, J. (2013). "Multifunctional T cell analyses to study response and progression in adoptive cell transfer immunotherapy". Cancer Discovery. 3 (4): 418–429. doi:10.1158/2159-8290.CD-12-0383. PMC 3716460. PMID 23519018.

2017 retraction. http://mct.aacrjournals.org/content/16/5/977
