= John L. Cameron =

American surgeon (born 1936)

- Born: 1936 (age 89–90); Howell, Michigan, U.S.

Academic background
- Education: BS, Harvard University; MD, Johns Hopkins School of Medicine

Academic work
- Institutions: Johns Hopkins School of Medicine

John Lemuel Cameron (born 1936) is an American surgeon. He is the Alfred Blalock Distinguished Service Professor of Surgery at the Johns Hopkins School of Medicine.

== Early life and education ==
Cameron was born in 1936 in Howell, Michigan to parents Duncan and Mary. When he was nine years old, his family moved to Detroit so his father could complete surgical training. He obtained his undergraduate degree from Harvard University in 1958, and his medical degree from Johns Hopkins School of Medicine in 1962. After an internship in surgery at Johns Hopkins, Cameron served in the U.S. Army as a research surgeon at the Walter Reed Army Institute of Research from 1963 to 1965. He then returned to Johns Hopkins to complete his surgical residency and fellowship.

== Career ==
Following his general surgery residency and his thoracic surgery specialty, Cameron was appointed an assistant professor of Surgery at Johns Hopkins in 1971. He was eventually promoted to the rank of full Professor and named Chairman of the Department of Surgery and Surgeon-in-Chief. While serving in this role, he decided to specialize in performing the Whipple procedure and, in March 2012, at the age of 75, he performed his 2000th Whipple procedure becoming the first doctor to reach that milestone.

During his tenure at Johns Hopkins, Cameron helped bring the Journal of Gastrointestinal Surgery from a quarterly publication in 1977 to a monthly publication with over 1,200 submissions annually. He also served in numerous leadership positions including president of the Society for Surgery of the Alimentary Tract, the Southern Surgical Association, the Society of Clinical Surgery, the Society of Surgical Chairmen, the Halsted Society, the American Surgical Association, and the American College of Surgeons. In 2009, he was the recipient of the Lifetime Achievement in Pancreatic Cancer Treatment. In 2002, Fred and Sandra Hittman and their family established the John L. Cameron, M.D., Professorship for Alimentary Tract Diseases in his honor.

Cameron officially retired from surgery on his 80th birthday.

== Personal life ==
Cameron and his wife have four children together.
