= Pickmore Jackson =

American shoemaker and politician (1822–1892)

Member of the Massachusetts House of Representatives from Saugus
- In office 1884
- Preceded by: Benjamin F. Newhall
- Succeeded by: Sewall Boardman

Personal details
- Born: November 7, 1822 Saugus, Massachusetts, US
- Died: February 9, 1892 (aged 69) Saugus, Massachusetts, US
- Spouse: Lura Nourse (m. 1848; died 1892)
- Children: 5 daughters, 1 son
- Occupation: Shoemaker

Pickmore Jackson (November 7, 1822 – February 9, 1892) was an American shoemaker and politician.

== Personal life ==
Pickmore Jackson was born in Saugus, Massachusetts on November 7, 1822 to William and Mary (Stocker) [Stanford] Jackson. He married Lura Nourse on September 14, 1848, with whom he had five daughters and one son. Lura died in Saugus on January 29, 1892, and Pickmore died there eleven days later on February 9, 1892.

== Career ==
In 1842, Jackson joined the shoemaking renaissance in Saugus, following the lead of the Raddin and Newhall families. Soon thereafter, he was elected by a majority of Saugus voters as their 1844 representative in the Massachusetts House of Representatives, replacing Benjamin F. Newhall. In 1845, no representative was sent as nobody received a majority of votes, so Jackson wasn't succeeded until Sewall Boardman served from 1846–47. By 1862, Jackson had also served on the Saugus school committee.
