= Benjamin H. Cheever Jr. =

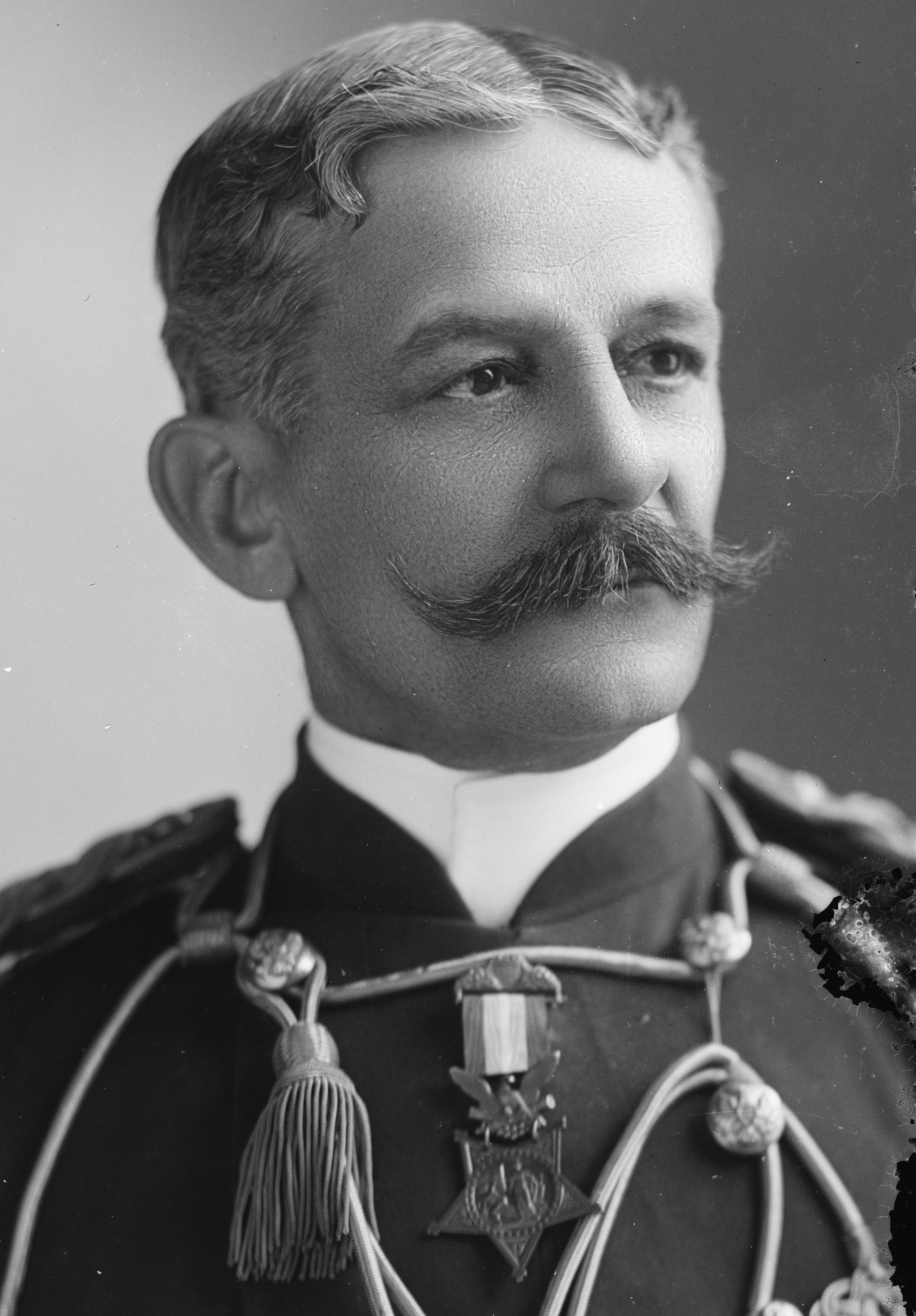
- Born: Benjamin Harrison Cheever Jr; June 7, 1850; Washington, D.C., U.S.
- Died: October 21, 1930 (aged 80); Ventnor City, New Jersey, U.S.
- Burial place: Arlington National Cemetery
- Military career
- Allegiance: United States
- Branch: United States Army
- Rank: Lieutenant Colonel
- Commands: 6th Cavalry Regiment; United States Volunteers; 8th Cavalry Regiment
- Conflicts: American Indian Wars

Benjamin Harrison Cheever Jr. (June 7, 1850 – October 21, 1930) was a US Army officer who received the Medal of Honor for his actions during the Indian Wars. He was born in Washington, D.C.

Cheever was appointed as second lieutenant of the 6th Cavalry Regiment in August 1876, and was promoted to first lieutenant in December 1881. He was promoted to captain in March 1893, and served as an inspector general of US Volunteers during the Spanish-American War, serving in the Philippines. In September 1902, he was promoted to major in the 8th Cavalry Regiment, but returned to his old regiment half a year later, and continued serving until his retirement with the rank of lieutenant colonel in 1910. He was later advanced to colonel on the retired list

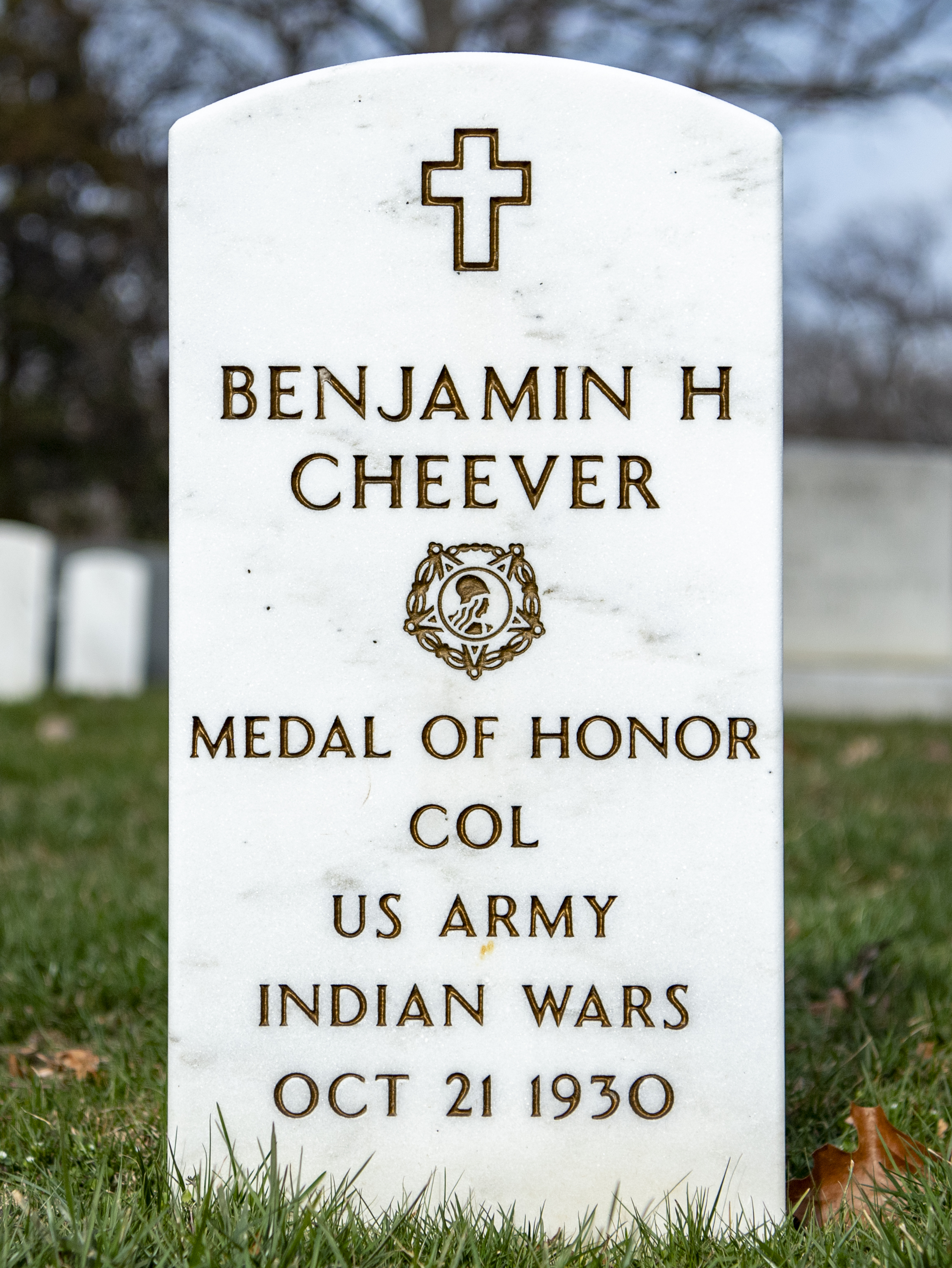

Cheever died in Ventnor City, New Jersey and was buried at Arlington National Cemetery.

== Medal of Honor citation ==
Rank and organization: First Lieutenant, 6th U.S. Cavalry. Place and date: At White River, S. Dak., January 1, 1891. Entered service at: Washington, D.C. Birth: June 7, 1850, Washington, D.C. Date of issue: April 25, 1891.

Headed the advance across White River partly frozen, in a spirited movement to the effective assistance of Troop K, 6th U.S. Cavalry.
