= Abijah Cheever =

American politician (1760–1843)

Member of the Massachusetts House of Representatives from Saugus
- In office 1822–1822
- Preceded by: Joseph Cheever
- Succeeded by: Jonathan Makepeace
- In office 1829–1830
- Preceded by: John Shaw
- Succeeded by: Joseph Cheever

Personal details
- Born: May 23, 1760 Saugus, Massachusetts
- Died: April 21, 1843 (aged 82) Saugus, Massachusetts
- Party: Federalist
- Spouses: Elizabeth Scott (m. 1789; died 1795); Sally Williams (m. 1789)
- Relations: Joseph Cheever (brother); David Williams Cheever (grandson); David Cheever (great-grandson)
- Children: 5
- Education: Harvard College

Abijah Cheever (May 23, 1760 – April 21, 1843) was an American surgeon and politician from Saugus, Massachusetts.

== Early life ==
Cheever was born on May 23, 1760, in Saugus. He was a descendant of Ezekiel Cheever, longtime headmaster of the Boston Latin School. Cheever spent much of his youth working on his family's farm.

== American Revolution ==
On the evening before the Battle of Lexington and Concord, Cheever ran bullets from a mold over a fire for the muskets of his brothers, who took part in the battle the following day.

In 1779 Cheever graduated from Harvard College. He then studied medicine and surgery under John Warren and obtained his M. D. in 1782.

On May 13, 1782 Cheever was commissioned as a surgeon aboard the Tartar, a ship fitted by the Commonwealth of Massachusetts for service in the American Revolution. On the ship's second voyage, it was captured by HMS Belisarius and Cheever was sent to a prison ship in New York Harbor. Once the war ended, Cheever was exchanged and returned to Massachusetts.

== Boston ==
After the war, Cheever settled in Boston's North End, where he worked as a physician and surgeon. On July 5, 1789, he married Elizabeth Scott. The couple had three children before her death on July 5, 1795. On October 16, 1798, he married Sally Williams, with whom he had two children.

== Return to Saugus ==
Cheever returned to Saugus in 1806 and remained there for the rest of his life. Cheever was one of Saugus' largest land owners with over two-hundred acres. He was also one of Saugus' few slaveholders. On his family's land, he built an elegant home that became well known throughout the region.

In 1815, Cheever was elected to Saugus' first Board of Selectmen, Assessors, and Overseers of the Poor.

In 1821, 1829, 1830, and 1831, Cheever represented Saugus in the Massachusetts House of Representatives. During his political career, Cheever frequently competed with his brother Joseph Cheever.

Cheever died on April 21, 1843.
