= Bill Dodge (footballer) =

English footballer

Personal information
- Full name: William Charles Dodge
- Date of birth: 10 March 1937 (age 89)
- Place of birth: Hackney, London, England
- Position: Wing half

Senior career*
Years	Team	Apps	(Gls)
?–1957	Eton Manor	?	(?)
1957–1962	Tottenham Hotspur	6	(0)
1962–1963	Crystal Palace	3	(0)
1963	Kettering Town		
1965–1971	Ashford Town (Kent)		
- * Club domestic league appearances and goals

William Charles Dodge (born 10 March 1936 in Hackney, London) is an English former professional footballer who played for Eton Manor, Tottenham Hotspur and Crystal Palace.

== Playing career ==
Dodge began his career at non-League club Eton Manor before joining Tottenham Hotspur in October, 1957. In January, 1959 after a string of poor results Spurs manager, Bill Nicholson dropped legendary Danny Blanchflower in a favour of the younger Dodge (the first of 57 players to be given their club debut by Nicholson) who played in a more defensive role. The decision prompted the Northern Ireland international to request a transfer. However, the White Hart Lane club were knocked out of the FA Cup by giantkillers Norwich City on 15 February 1959. After this shock result, Blanchflower was reinstated and appointed team captain a fortnight later. Dodge featured in ten matches in all competitions in 1959 with the Lilywhites. He transferred to Crystal Palace in July, 1962 where he notched up a further three appearances.

He went on to play non-league football with Kettering Town and Ashford Town (Kent) for whom he had a 100% league appearance record over five years, and in his overall stay at Ashford a total of 425 appearances in all competitions.
