= Joseph Cheever =

American politician (1772–1872)

Member of the Massachusetts House of Representatives from Saugus
- In office 1817–1821^{1}
- Preceded by: Robert Eames
- Succeeded by: Abijah Cheever
- In office 1831–1832
- Preceded by: Abijah Cheever
- Succeeded by: Zaccheus N. Stocker
- In office 1835–1835
- Preceded by: Zaccheus N. Stocker
- Succeeded by: William W. Boardman

Personal details
- Born: February 22, 1772
- Died: June 19, 1872 (aged 100)

Joseph Cheever (February 22, 1772 – June 19, 1872) was an American farmer and politician who held office in Saugus, Massachusetts.

Cheever was born on February 22, 1772. In 1816, he became Saugus' first Town Treasurer. He represented Saugus in the Massachusetts House of Representatives in 1817, 1818, 1820, 1821, 1831, 1832, and 1835. Cheever died on June 19, 1872, aged 100. During his political career, Cheever frequently competed with his brother Abijah Cheever.

== Notes ==
1. Until 1857, a majority of votes at a town meeting was needed to elect a representative to the Massachusetts House of Representatives. If no person received a majority of votes, no representative was sent. After electing Cheever in 1817 and 1818, Saugus was unable to select a representative in 1819. Cheever was returned to office in 1820 and 1821.
