= Joseph Alexander Ames =

American artist

Joseph Ames
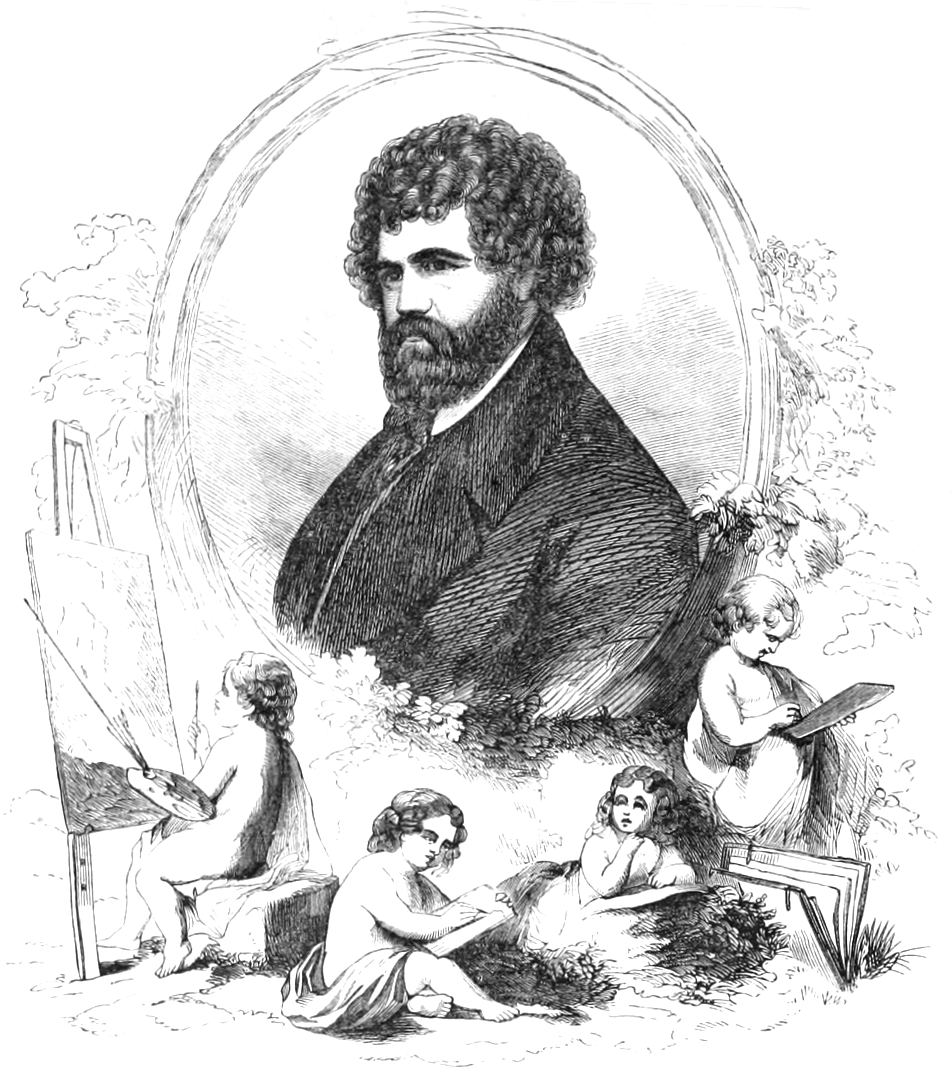
- Ames in 1859
- Born: July 16, 1816; Roxbury, New Hampshire, U.S.
- Died: October 30, 1872 (aged 56); New York City
- Occupation: Artist
- Spouse: Sarah Fisher Ames
- Relatives: Nathan Ames (brother)

Joseph Alexander Ames (1816–1872) was an American artist, primarily known for portrait and genre painting.

== Biography ==
Originally named Joseph Emes, he was born in Roxbury, New Hampshire. Ames began painting at a young age. At the age of twelve Henry Theodore Tuckerman wrote about one of his paintings. After moderate success at home in Saugus, Massachusetts, he left for Boston in 1841. While in Boston, Ames tried to replicate the style of Washington Allston. In 1848, Ames traveled to Rome, where he painted a portrait of Pope Pius IX that was featured at the National Academy of Design's annual exhibition in 1850. When he returned from Italy he was commissioned by Rufus Choate, Daniel Webster, and Abraham Lincoln. He kept a studio in Boston in Amory Hall (ca.1849), and later on Tremont Street (ca.1856), and then on Summer Street. Ames exhibited at the Boston Athenæum, the National Academy of Design, and the Pennsylvania Academy. He eventually moved to Baltimore, and then to New York, where he died of a "brain fever". He died on October 30, 1872.

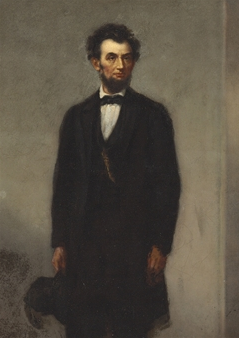
Portrait of Lincoln by Ames, c.1865

Ames was one of the founding Members of the Boston Art Club. He was elected a member of the National Academy of Design in 1870.

His brother Nathan was a poet and patent solicitor who invented many machines, including the escalator. His wife, Sarah Fisher Ames was a sculptor.
