= Benjamin F. Newhall =

American politician (1802–1863)

Member of the Massachusetts House of Representatives from Saugus
- In office 1842–1843
- Preceded by: Stephen Hawkes
- Succeeded by: Pickmore Jackson

Saugus Town Clerk
- In office 1841–1847
- Preceded by: William W. Boardman
- Succeeded by: Harmon Hall

Personal details
- Born: April 29, 1802 Saugus, Massachusetts, US
- Died: September 17, 1863 (aged 61) Saugus, Massachusetts, US
- Party: Liberty; Free Soil
- Spouse: Sarah Jewett
- Education: New Market Academy
- Occupation: Laborer; Shopkeeper; Shoe manufacturer Preacher; Politician; Writer

Benjamin Franklin Newhall (April 29, 1802 – September 17, 1863) was an American businessman, abolitionist, politician, and writer.

== Early life ==
Newhall was born on April 29, 1802, in Saugus, Massachusetts (then part of Lynn) to Jacob and Abigail (Makepeace) Newhall. His grandfather, Jacob Newhall, better known as Landlord Newhall, was a leading supporter of American independence and an organizer of the Saugus Minute Men. His Rising Sun Tavern was visited by Gilbert du Motier, Marquis de Lafayette and George Washington. Newhall was also a descendant of Thomas Newhall, the first white person born in Lynn.

Newhall spent his early years growing up in a tavern. He had a very close relationship with his mother, who would often kneel at his bedside and pray that God protect her son from the temptations that surrounded him. Hearing this, Newhall vowed that his mother's prayers would not be in vain. Conversely, he had a strong dislike for his father, as Newhall blamed his father's drinking for his family's suffering.

At age 13 or 14, Newhall began assisting his father at his shoemaking shop. However, he hated this work and later found employment at a chocolate factory. Newhall was an ambitious worker who worked so hard that his mother begged him to quit. However, he refused as he was determined to provide her with some money.

In 1818 he left the factory to work on a farm in Nahant. While working here, Newhall accidentally cut off one of his thumbs while chopping wood with an axe. The farmer sewed it back on and when Newhall returned home it was tended to by a doctor. The thumb was saved, but it took two months for it to heal.

At the age of 21, Newhall left home to attend the New Market Academy in New Hampshire. After six months he returned to Massachusetts and began teaching at a school in Stoneham.

== Business ==
On April 25, 1825, Newhall married Sarah Jewett of Stanstead, Lower Canada (now Quebec). They would have seven children, two of which died in infancy. Soon thereafter he moved to Canada and opened a shop with his brother-in-law. The business failed and in 1830 he returned to Saugus in debt, which his uncle assisted him in paying off.

Upon his return he borrowed money and opened a shoe making business. He would establish himself as "one of the most successful, shrewd, and wealthy businessmen in the vicinity."

In 1852, he helped establish the Saugus Mutual Fire Insurance Company. He was the company's secretary and treasurer until he was incapacitated by illness in 1861.

In 1852, Newhall was also elected as a director of the Saugus Branch Railroad Co.

Due to his rise from humble origins to successful businessman, Newhall was often referred to as a "self-made man".

== Religion ==
Newhall was very religious during his early years. During the 1820s he was a lay Methodist preacher. His support for moral reforms put him at odds with the conservative Methodist clergy and he left for the Universalist church. From 1838 to 1848, Newhall frequently took the pulpit at Saugus' Universalist church.

== Politics ==
Newhall was a member of the Liberty and Free Soil parties.

He was an opponent of slavery. He served as president of the Saugus chapter of the Massachusetts Anti-Slavery Society. His home at 17-19 Ballard Street was a station on the Underground Railroad, where runaway slaves stopped on the journey from Boston to a safe house in South Danvers, where they received medical attention from Dr. Andrew Nichols.

Newhall was also a supporter of the Temperance movement.

From 1841 to 1847, Newhall served as Saugus Town Clerk.

In 1842 and 1843, Newhall represented Saugus in the Massachusetts House of Representatives. While serving in the state legislature, Newhall was an opponent of capital punishment.

From 1844 to 1850, Newhall was an Essex County Commissioner.

In 1846, Newhall was the Free Soil candidate for the United States House of Representatives in Massachusetts's 2nd congressional district. He finished second behind Whig Daniel P. King, but ahead of Democrat Robert Rantoul Jr.

Newhall also served as a selectman, overseer of the poor, member of the school committee, and justice of the peace.

== Writing ==
Although he had never received any formal training in grammar beyond common school and his six months at the New Market Academy, Newhall was a prolific writer of both prose and poetry. His most famous work was his "Historical Sketches of Saugus" which first appeared in the Lynn Weekly Reporter in December 1858 and continued for two or three years.

Newhall wrote on a number subjects and adapted his style to the subject at hand, being as grave or lighthearted as they occasion required. Newhall's natural kindness meant that he was rarely severe. His rhymes were usually good and sometimes even showed considerable ingenuity. In some of his works there ran a vein of quiet humor which would break into a flash of satire. His works often contained a religious element, which was conspicuous of Newhall's character.

== Later life and death ==
During the final ten years of his life, Newhall suffered from chronic rheumatism. During his last two years he was confined to his bed. Newhall died on September 17, 1863.
