= William Dodge (bookseller) =

American bookseller (1811–1875)

- Born: February 19, 1811; Massachusetts, USA
- Died: December 19, 1875 (aged 64); Cincinnati, Ohio, USA
- Occupation(s): Bookseller, shoemaker, laborer, musician, book publisher

William Dodge (19 February 1811 – 19 December 1875) was an American bookseller, publisher, and laborer. At one point, he was one of the most well-known rare and out of print book dealers in the Cincinnati area.

== Early life and career ==
Dodge was born on 19 February 1811 in Massachusetts to a family of shoemakers and took up the trade after the death of his father, living in the town of Saugus before re-locating to Cincinnati, Ohio in 1849. He owned two stores on Ninth Street, primarily running his shoemaking business while expanding into selling American books.

Around the same time, Dodge also made a name for himself as a dealer of rare and out-of-print books. He collaborated with Robert Clarke to publish eight books and pamphlets on Native Americans and military history in New England and the Old Northwest and would eventually re-publishing and printing various historical books. The first of this series was an edition of Samuel Penhallow's 1726 History of the Wars of New-England with the Eastern Indians in 1859. From there, Dodge also printed editions of Lion Gardiner's History of the Pequot War in 1860, characterized by rubricated red-and-black print title pages and uncut page edges that were sold in limited numbers.

During the Civil War, he left his publishing business to serve as a musician and fifer in the Second Ohio Infantry Regiment for four years. Upon his return to Ohio, Dodge retired from shoemaking to pursue bookselling and coin dealing full-time, growing in popularity and publishing various editions that were again produced in small quantities. By 1874, he was employed by the city's street department as a laborer; having scaled down his publishing operations while still dealing books at his store. Later in life, Dodge was primarily known as a musician for playing fife in costume in local parades on George Washington's Birthday and the Fourth of July.

== Personal life ==
Dodge married Mary Elizabeth Morgan in Saugus in May 1836, and the couple had at least one child before her death in 1842. He remarried the following year in August 1843, again in Saugus, to Lucy E. White. The two divorced around when Dodge moved in Cincinnati, and in May 1850, he married for the third and final time, to Sarah McFarland.

Dodge died on December 19, 1875.
