= Nathan Ames =

American poet

- Born: Nathan Eames; November 17, 1826; Roxbury, New Hampshire
- Died: August 17, 1865 (aged 38); Saugus, Massachusetts
- Occupation: Patent Solicitor
- Known for: "First" escalator patent, #25, 076, in United States

Nathan Ames (November 17, 1826 – August 17, 1865) was a patent solicitor who held the first patent in the United States for an escalator-like machine. The patent (#25,076) was granted on August 9, 1859, for an invention he called "Revolving Stairs". The escalator had steps mounted on a continuous belt or chain. He also patented machines for improvement in polishing leather during the time when Lynn's shoemaking industry was one of the largest in the world. Another one of his patents was for a polygraph, an early copying machine that operated by using pens connected by wires. Another patent he held was for an improved grater.

A writer and a poet, Ames had a disquisition and a Class Ode published during his time at Harvard. His book of poetry Pirate’s Glen and Dungeon Rock was published in 1853. These poems were based the local pirate legend of Dungeon Rock.

His brother Joseph was an American portrait artist.

Ames was educated at Phillips Academy at Andover, and Harvard College.

His birth name was Nathan Eames, but it was legally changed to Nathan Ames in 1843.
