= Ezekiel Cheever =

English linguist and teacher (1614–1708)

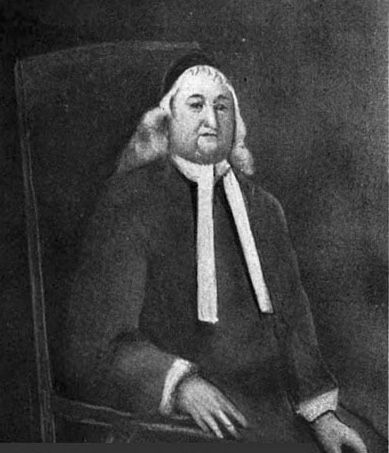
- Born: January 24, 1614; London, England
- Died: August 21, 1708 (aged 94); Boston, Province of Massachusetts Bay
- Occupations: Schoolmaster, author
- Known for: Education
- Children: 11

Ezekiel Cheever (1614–1708) was a schoolmaster, and the author of "probably the earliest American school book", Accidence, A Short Introduction to the Latin Tongue. Upon his death, it was said that "New England [had] never known a better teacher." He has been called "the chief representative of the colonial schoolmaster".

== Biography ==
Cheever came to Boston, Massachusetts in June 1637. Not much later, he went to New Haven, Connecticut and taught school. In 1650, Cheever moved the family back to Massachusetts. On December 29, 1670, he was invited to become Head Master of the Boston Latin School. He taught for seventy years, the last thirty-eight as master of the Boston Latin School. Cotton Mather gave the eulogy at his funeral. In it Mather praised Cheever for his "untiring abjuration of the devil."

== Family ==
In 1638, Cheever married Mary Culverwell, his first wife. She was the daughter of Ezekiel Culverwell, niece of Nathaniel Culverwell and cousin of William Gouge. Ezekiel and Mary had six children. Their daughter, Elizabeth, was grandmother of Ezekiel Goldthwait. Their son, Rev Samuel, graduated from Harvard in 1659. Mary died on January 20, 1649.

On November 18, 1652, Ezekiel married Ellen Lathrop who was the sister of Capt Thomas Lathrop, a casualty during King Philip's War. Ezekiel and Ellen had five children. Their son, Rev Thomas, graduated from Harvard in 1677. Their son, Ezekiel Cheever, was a resident at Salem Village during the time of the Witch Trials.

Ezekiel was an ancestor of author John Cheever.

== Legacy ==
- Ezekiel Cheever School was named in his honor.
