= Saugus Field =

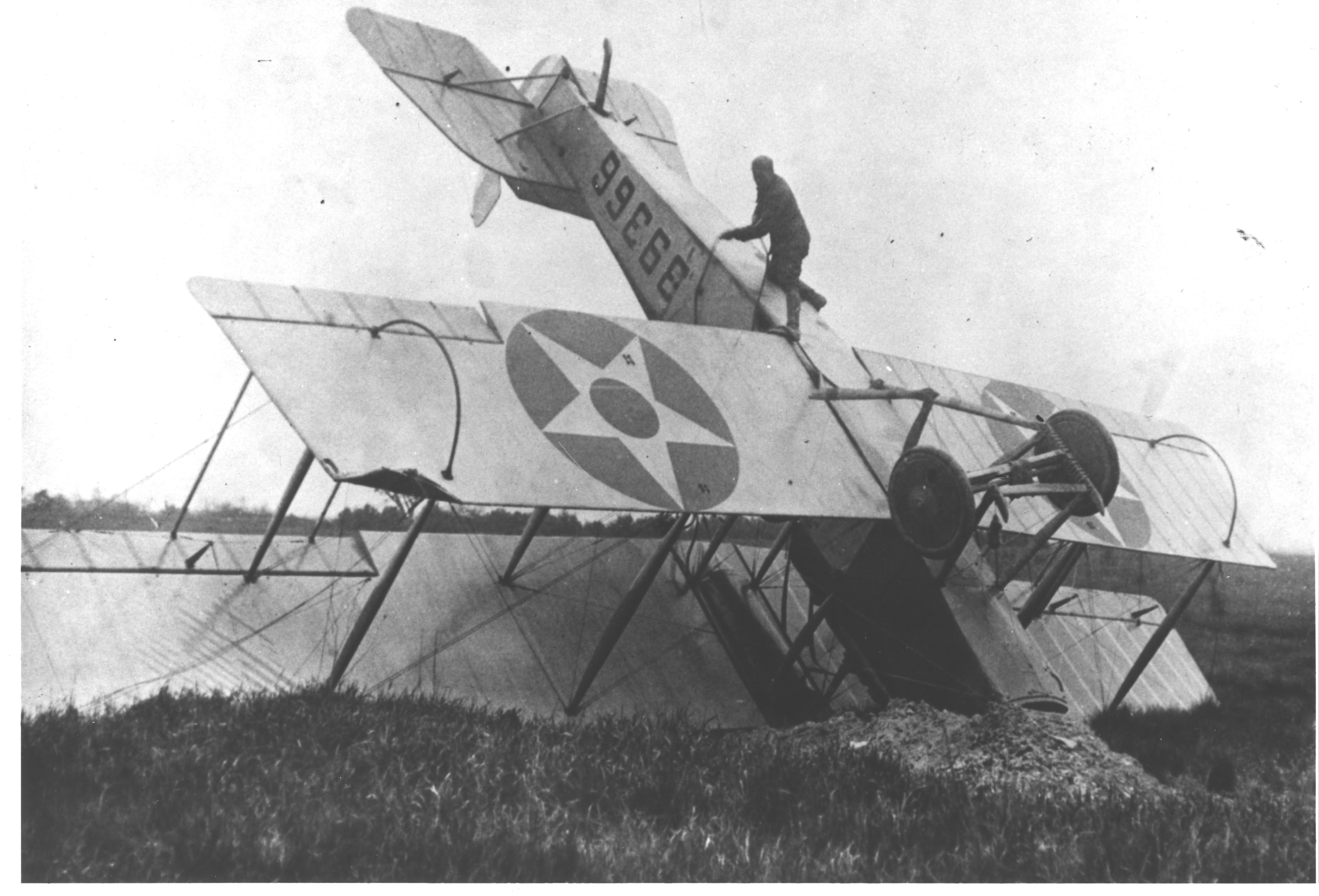
- Wrecked airmail plane in Saugus, Massachusetts
- IATA: none; ICAO: none

Summary
- Airport type: Closed
- Location: Saugus, Massachusetts
- In use: 1911–1927
- Coordinates: 42°26′26″N 71°0′19″W
- Interactive map of Saugus Field

Saugus Field also known as Atwood Park was an early American airfield located in Saugus, Massachusetts. It was used by pioneer aviators Harry Atwood, Ruth Bancroft Law, and Lincoln J. Beachey.

== Creation ==
The idea of building an aviation field on the site of the Old Saugus Race Track was first proposed in December 1910 by the Aeroplane Company of America. The company proposed spending $100,000 to convert the old race track into an air field and construct a factory for the manufacturing of flying machines. The company also planned to maintain a flight school and hold aviation meets on the site. The company asked the town to extend its water mains to the field, improve its electrical light equipment, keep the roads leading to the field in good condition, and be lenient in the tax assessment of the improved property. The Saugus site was chosen because it consisted of many acres of flat, dry land and open marsh land, there was sufficient room for the construction of new buildings, and the atmospheric conditions were ideal for flying.

Flying began at the Saugus race track in 1911. In 1912, the property was purchased by the General Aviation Corporation who named it Atwood Park in honor of pilot Harry Atwood.

== Aviation school ==
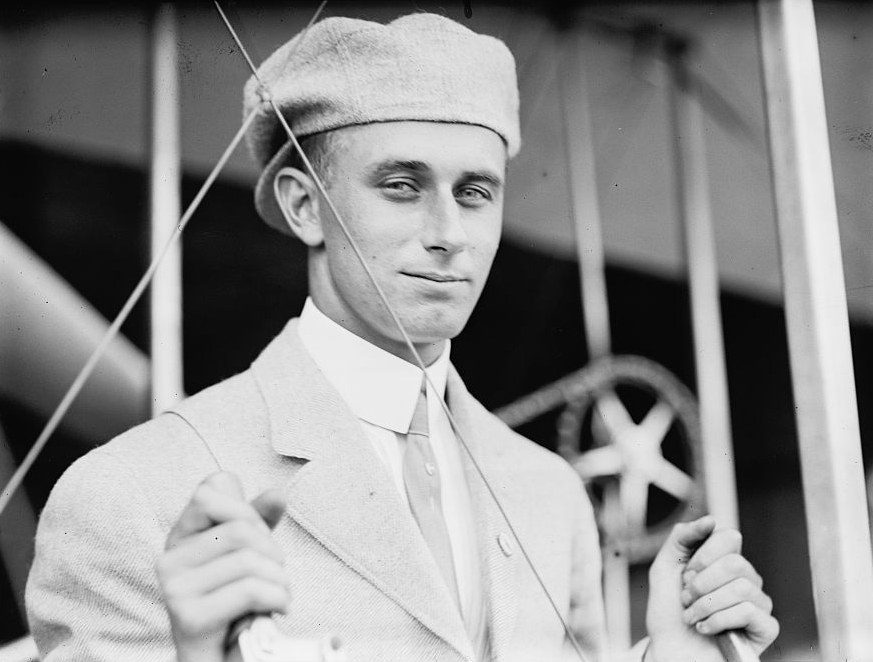
Harry Atwood, circa 1913

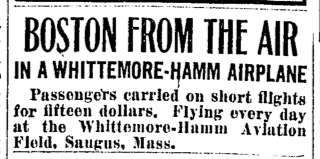
1919 Boston Globe advertisement for short flights at Saugus Field.

Atwood Park was home to one of the busiest aviation schools in the country. In 1912 the school had 43 students, more than any other aviation school in the United States. The school used a Burgess–Wright Model B for instruction. Atwood was the school's chief instructor, but assistant instructor Arch Freeman did most of the flying. Ripley Bowman also instructed at the school. Atwood quit on June 10, 1912. The reasons given for his departure were that he could make more money in exhibition flights and he had become disenchanted with Freeman. Atwood took the school's only plane with him and as a result, the school closed. None of the students had completed their formal training, but some students, including Jack McGee, H. Roy Waite, and Ruth Bancroft Law, had received enough training that they were able to fly their own planes solo. Waite established a new school at the aviation field that remained open until early 1913.

After Atwood's departure the airfield was known as the Saugus Field, Whittemore-Hamm Aviation Field, Franklin Park Aviation Field, or the Saugus Race Track, in reference to the property's former use. The airfield remained in use until 1927.

== Notable events ==
On December 21, 1911, Atwood claimed to break the record for longest time in the air in a hydroaeroplane by remaining in the air for 80 minutes.

On May 30, May 31, and June 1, 1912, Atwood Park hosted an aviation meet that was attended by some of the biggest aviators in the country, including Atwood, Lincoln Beachey, Philip W. Page, and Arch Freeman.

On the first day of the meet, Atwood made the first airmail delivery in New England. He flew about five miles to the Lynn, Massachusetts Town Commons where he dropped a sack of mail from the plane. The sack was then retrieved by a Lynn postal employee and driven to the post office.

On July 31, 1912 "Boy Aviator" Farnum Fish and a student survived a crash after a plane they were flying hit an air pocket, dropped 150 feet, crashed into a pole, turned upside-down, and fell to the ground. Fish was able to extract himself from the plane, but then fell headlong into a ditch filled with water. Morris Shoemanhorne, Fish's student, was also able to remove himself from the wreck. The two were then assisted by mechanics who had been working in the hangar. Fish suffered only minor injuries while Shoemanhorne had a bruised head and a badly twisted right ankle. Shoemanhorne's injuries were attended to at the Race Track Hotel and then he was sent home.

On October 21, 1915, J. Chauncy Redding and Philip Bulman were killed when their plane crashed about a third of a mile from the airfield. The plane dropped 800 feet after the supporting braces and wires holding one of the wings suddenly collapsed.

On May 16, 1919, Melvin W. Hodgdon won the Boston Globe Trophy by flying from Atlantic City, New Jersey to Saugus in 3 hours and 59 minutes.

== Later use ==
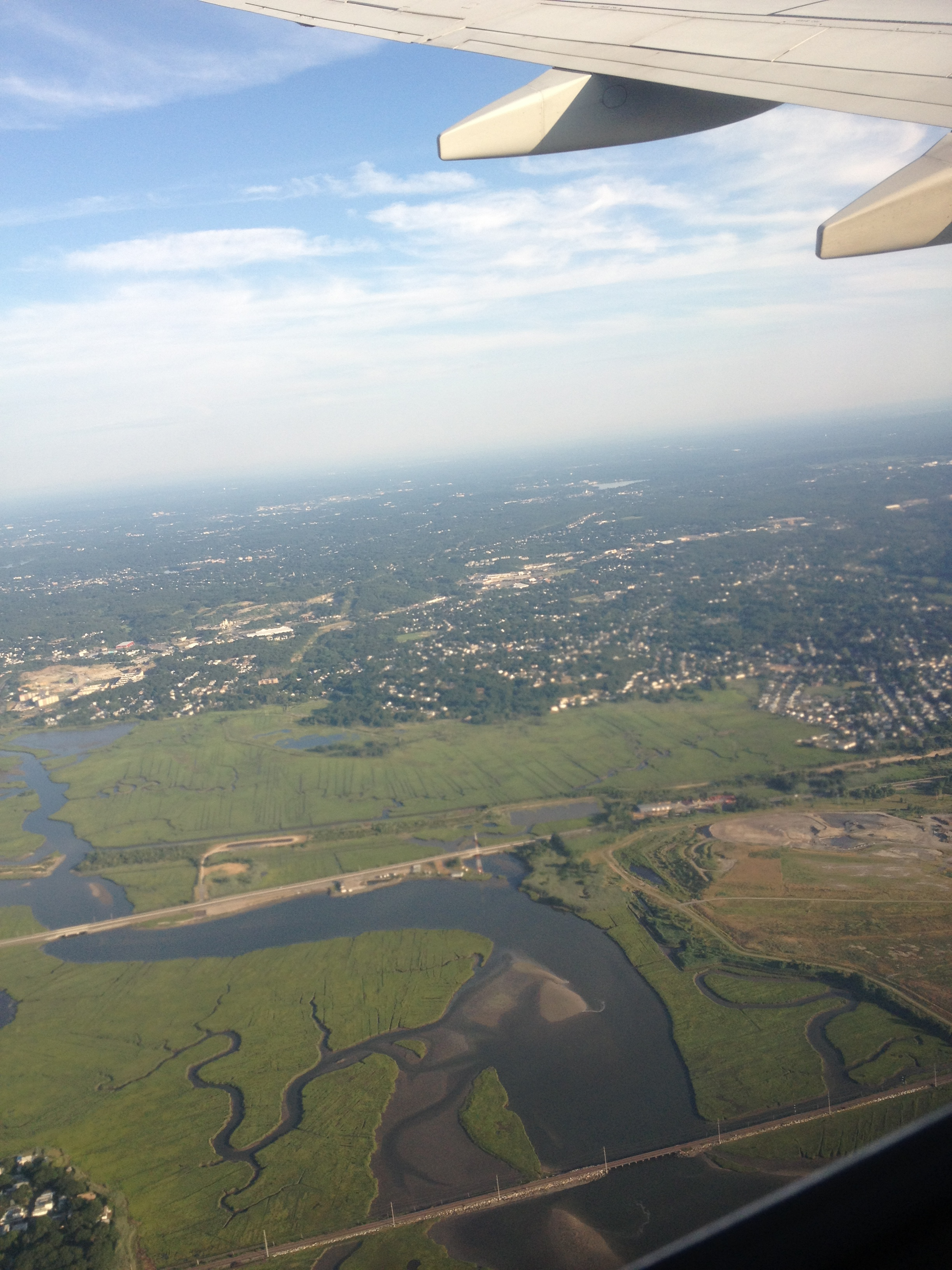
Location of Saugus Field in 2013

In 1932 the race track was converted into an auto racing facility. It closed the following year.

After Massachusetts legalized pari-mutuel wagering in 1934, a group of area businessmen and government officials led by Henry A. B. Peckham, John J. Mullen, Charles Friend, Harold Dodge, Frederick Willis, William Landergan, and James E. McElroy attempted to bring horse racing back to the site. Mullen even arranged a meeting with his friend Governor Joseph B. Ely in an attempt to get his assistance. Ely refused to express any opinion on the matter and stated that the matter was for the Racing Commission to decide.

In 1940, property owner Godfrey Lowell Cabot offered the site to the United States Navy for use as the location of its main New England dirigible base. In 1948 he donated the land to Northeastern University. In 1950 a proposal was made to construct a $5 million gasoline storage plant on the site.

In 1970 developer George W. Page and property owner Martin DeMatteo presented the Board of Selectmen with a plan to build a 60,000-seat stadium on the property. The plan was opposed by conservationists who objected to building a stadium on Rumney Marsh. It was abandoned when the Boston Patriots chose Foxborough, Massachusetts as the location of their new stadium.

Since 1990, the property has been owned by the Massachusetts Department of Conservation and Recreation (formerly the Metropolitan District Commission).

== See also ==
- Franklin Park (race track)
