= Franklin Park (race track) =

- Interactive map of Franklin Park
- Location: Saugus, Massachusetts
- Coordinates: 42°26′26″N 71°0′19″W
- Date opened: 1859
- Date closed: 1905
- Course type: Harness

Franklin Park also known as the Franklin Trotting Park, Franklin Driving Park, Old Saugus Race Course, and the Old Saugus Race Track was an American Harness racing track located in Saugus, Massachusetts.

== Early years ==
Franklin Park opened in 1859 on the Boyton Estate. It consisted of a one-mile track, new stables, and a hotel. It was constructed at an expense of $50,000.

== Reopening ==
After sitting idle for almost a decade, Franklin Park was reopened by a group from Lynn, Massachusetts in 1884. That year a stable containing 100 15 by 12 box stalls, a judge's stand, and a new hotel were erected. Three years later, the track was renovated and a grandstand and a number of new stalls were built. The track was renovated again in 1889 when it was taken over O.S. Roberts. Less than a year later, Franklin Park was purchased by eighteen of Roberts's creditors, who formed a syndicate called the Franklin Association of Lynn. It was later purchased by the Brighton Beach Racing Association, owner of Brighton Beach Race Course. The BBRA leased out Franklin Park to local managers.

== Closure ==
Although the track attracted many affluent citizens, it also attracted some seedier elements. In 1898 the New England Society for the Suppression of Vice alleged that illegal gambling activities were taking place at Franklin Park. In 1905, the race track closed after local citizens complained about the questionable patrons that the racetrack attracted. Races that were to be held in Saugus in 1906 were moved to Albany, New York.

== Later use ==
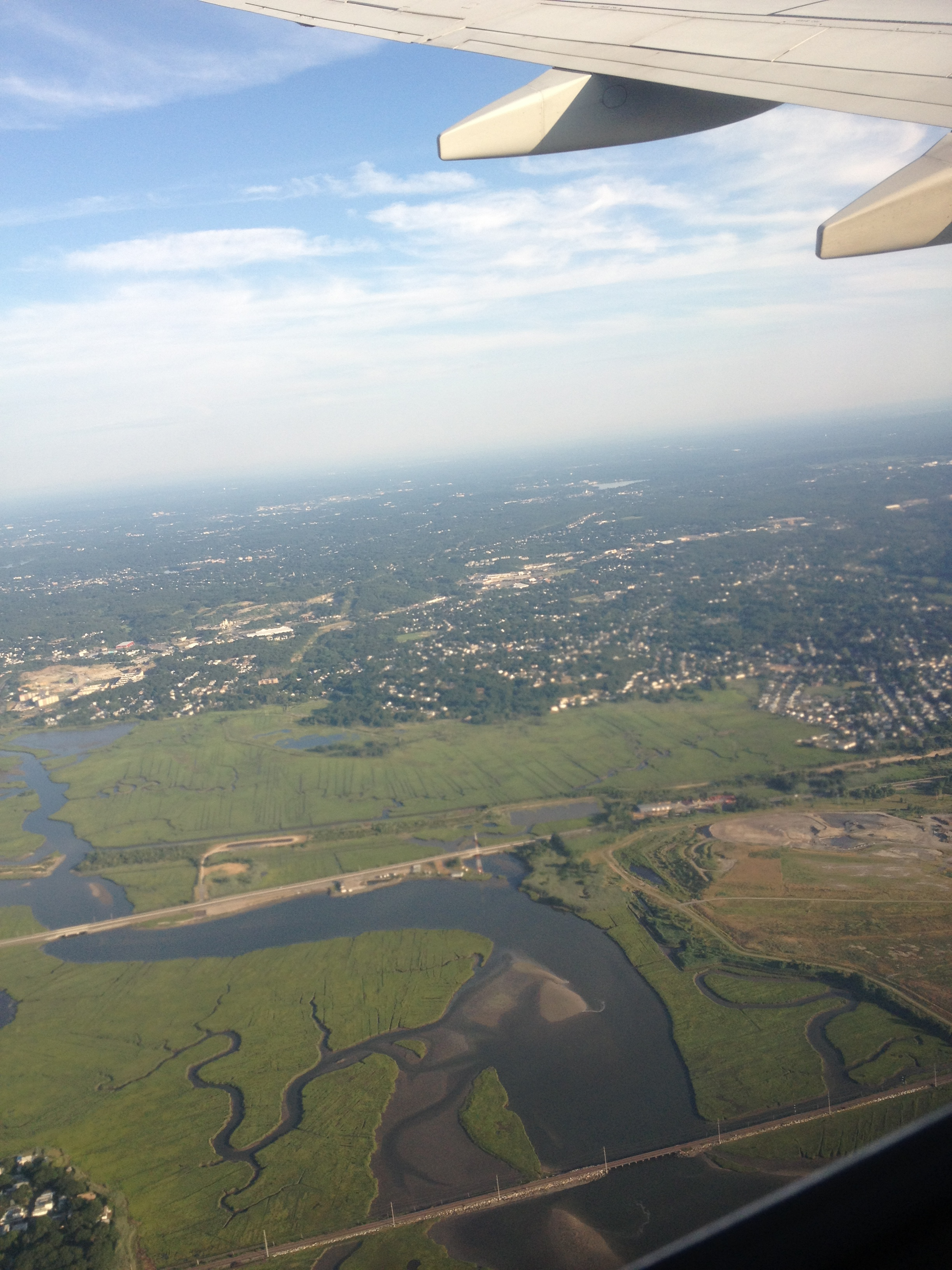
Location of Franklin Park in 2013

After it closed, the race track was used to host fairs, field days, picnics, motorcycle races, bonfires, and circuses and the hotel became a private residence. Due to its remote location, Franklin Park was frequently used as a dumping ground.

In 1911 the property became an airfield and was used by pioneer aviators Harry Atwood, Ruth Bancroft Law, and Lincoln J. Beachey.

In 1932 the track reopened as an auto racing facility. It closed the following year.

After Massachusetts legalized pari-mutuel wagering in 1934, a group of area businessmen and government officials led by Henry A. B. Peckham, John J. Mullen, Charles Friend, Harold Dodge, Frederick Willis, William Landergan, and James E. McElroy attempted to bring horse racing back to the site. Mullen even arranged a meeting with his friend Governor Joseph B. Ely in an attempt to get his assistance. Ely refused to express any opinion on the matter and stated that the matter was for the Racing Commission to decide.

In 1940, property owner Godfrey Lowell Cabot offered the site to the United States Navy for use as the location of its main New England dirigible base. In 1948 he donated the land to Northeastern University. In 1950 a proposal was made to construct a $5 million gasoline storage plant on the site.

In 1970 developer George W. Page and property owner Martin DeMatteo presented the Board of Selectmen with a plan to build a 60,000 seat stadium on the property. The plan was opposed by conservationists who objected to building a stadium on Rumney Marsh. It was abandoned when the Boston Patriots chose Foxborough, Massachusetts as the location of their new stadium.

Since 1990, the property has been owned by the Department of Conservation and Recreation (formerly the Metropolitan District Commission).

== Gallery ==
Photos taken June 1st 2021

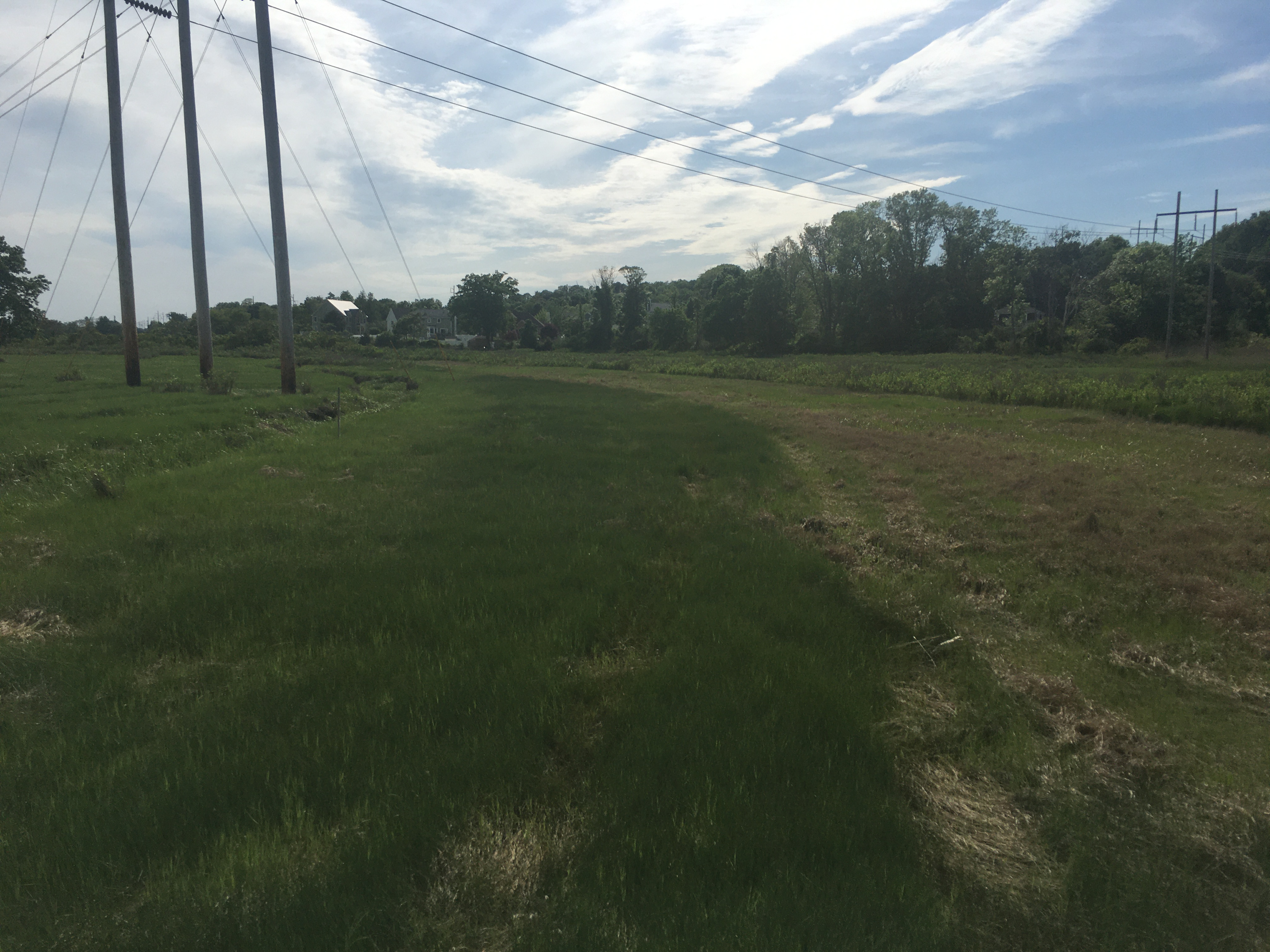
Franklin Park race track after entering from Saugus Ave and walking west.

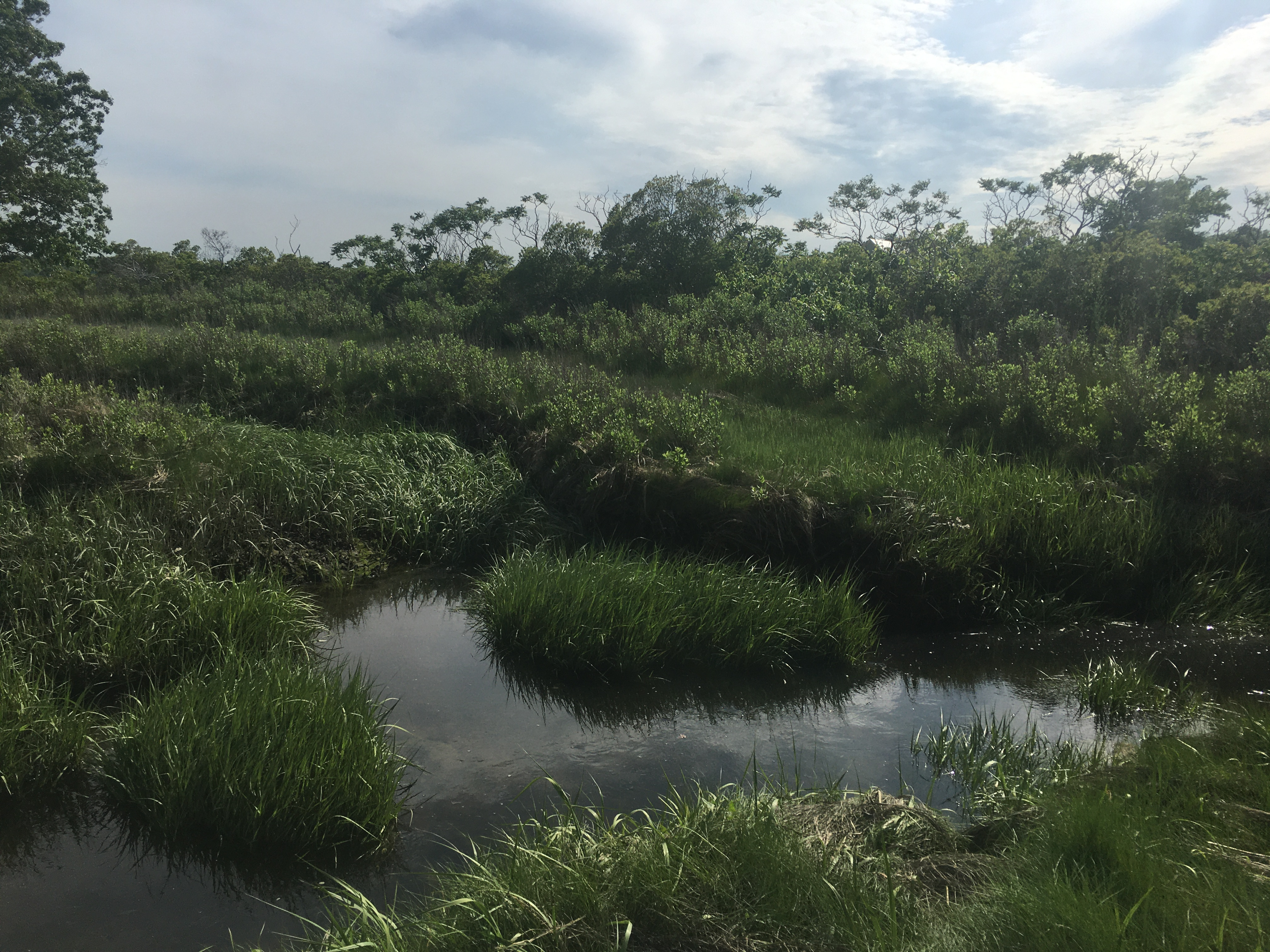
First Stream after walking west down track.

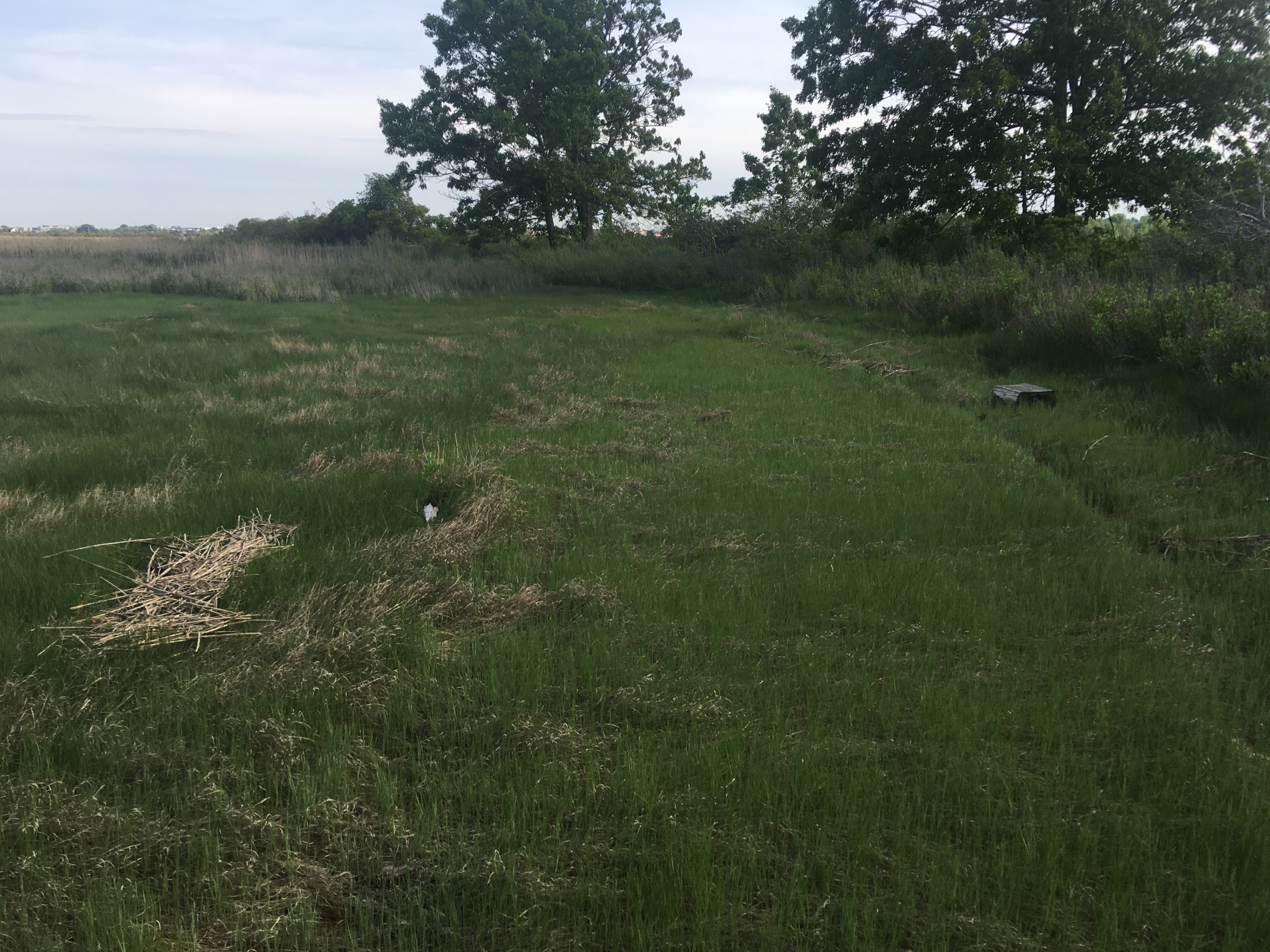
After first stream.

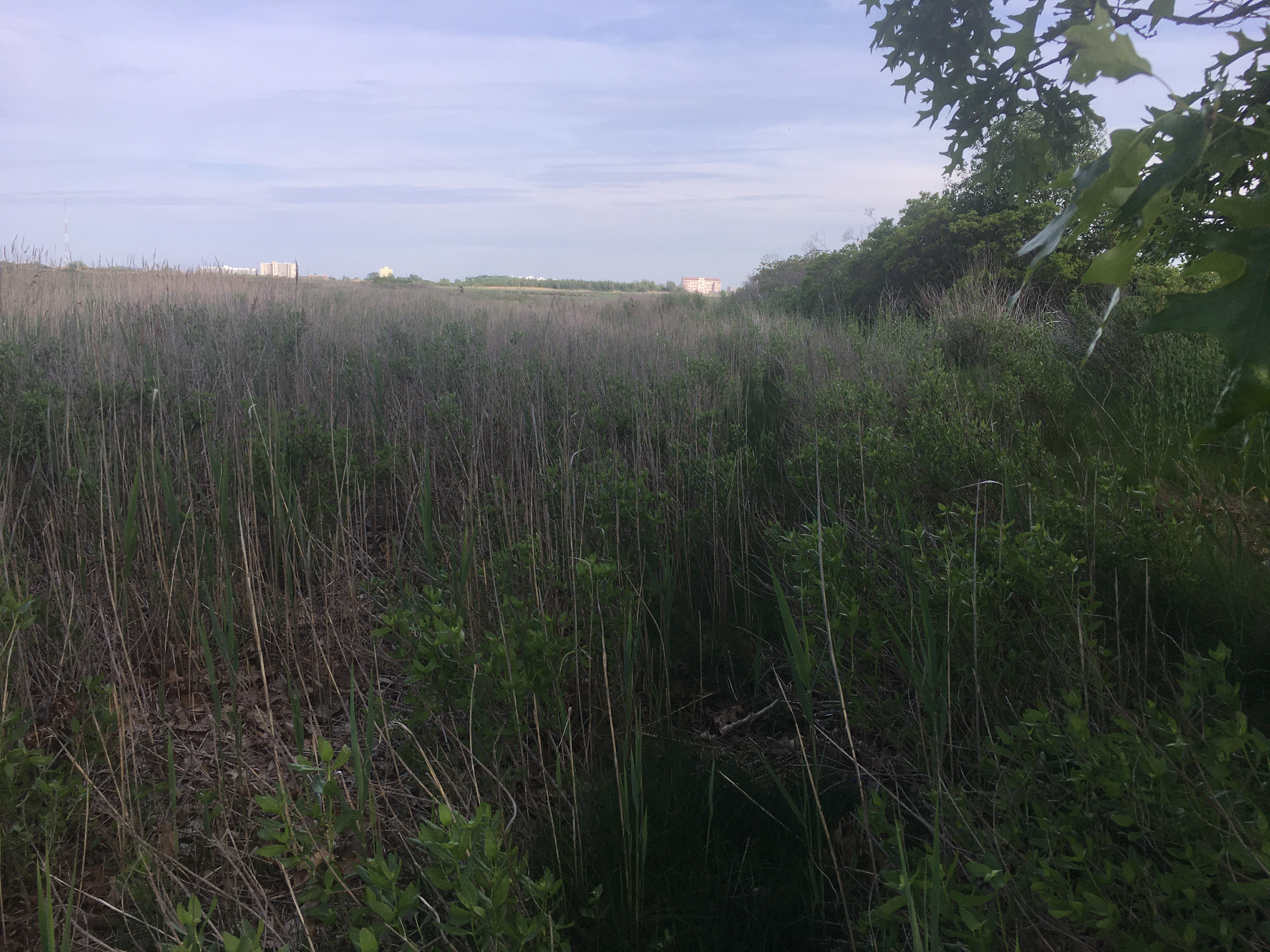
West corner of the track. (It gets a little bushy but it's only like this shortly)

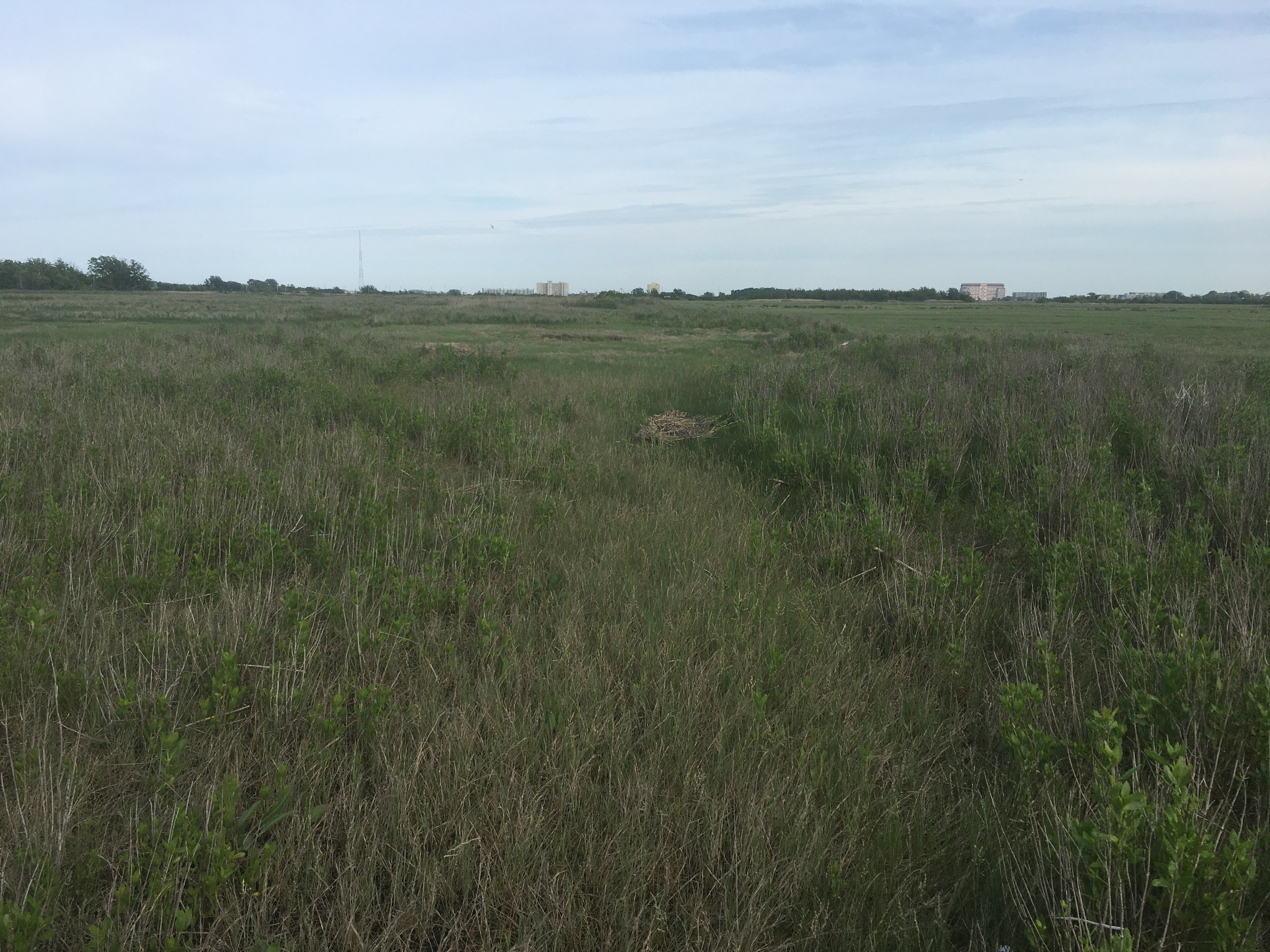
South side of race track.

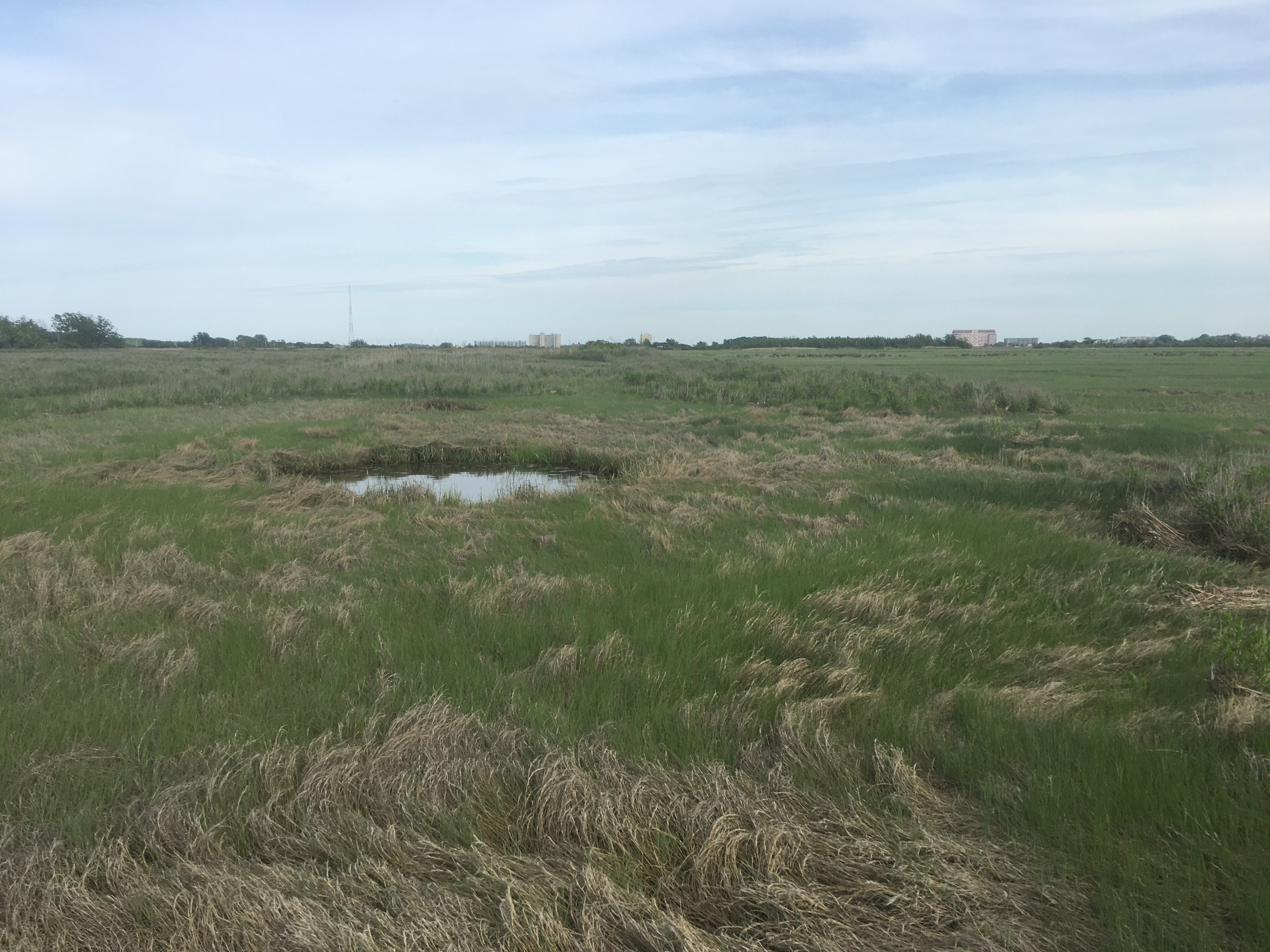
South side of race track continued.

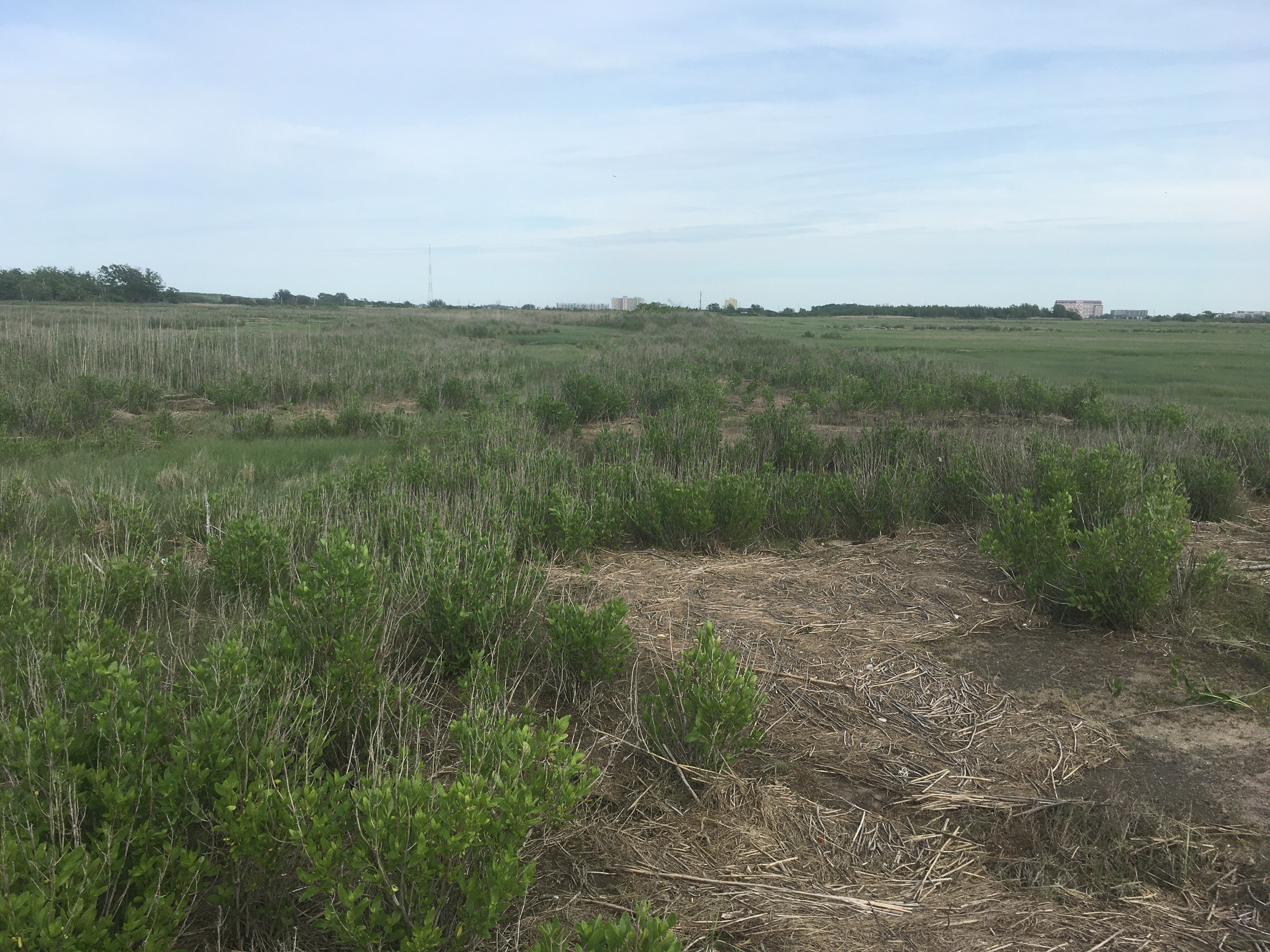
South side of race track continued.

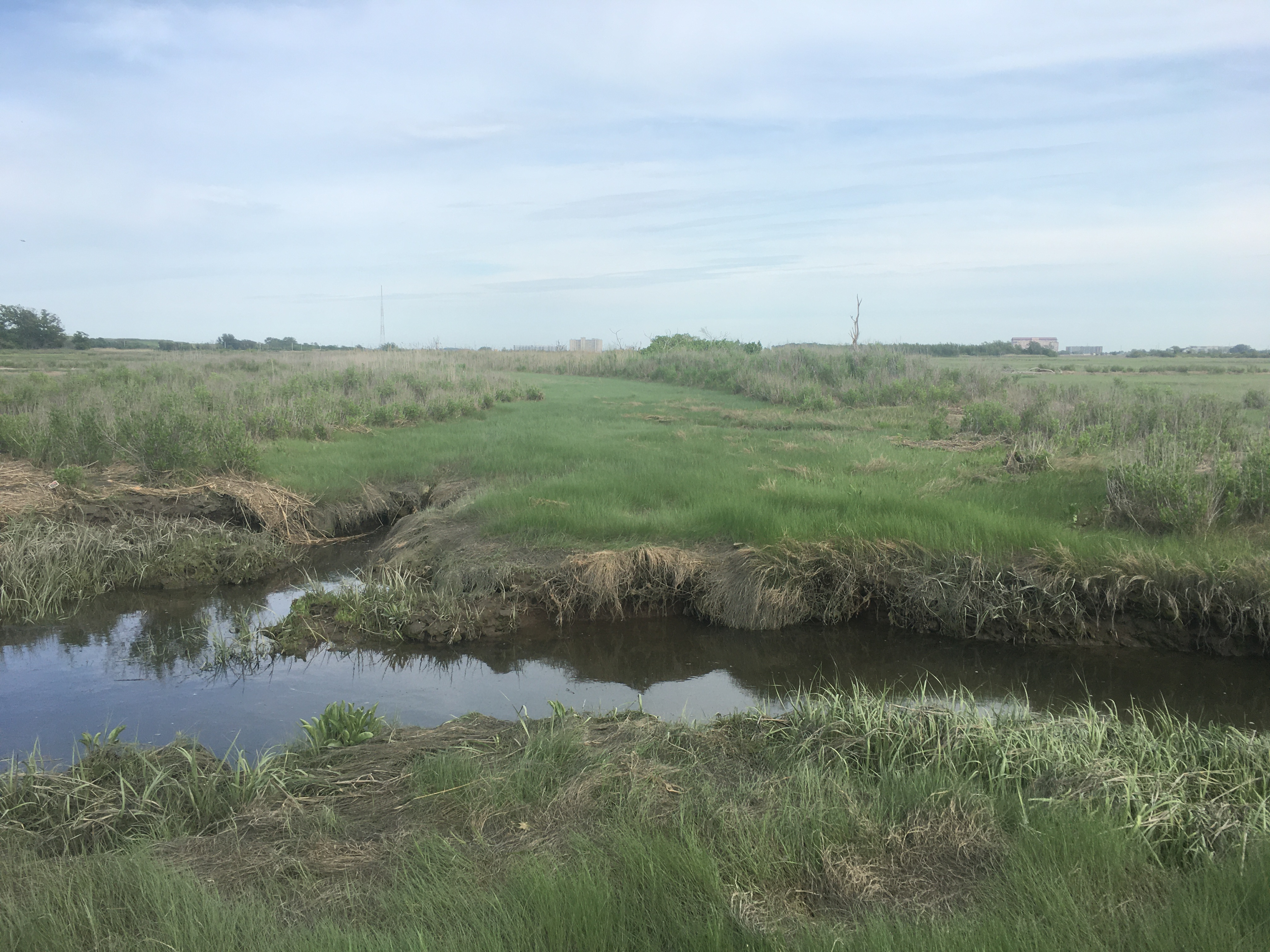
Second stream on south side of race track.

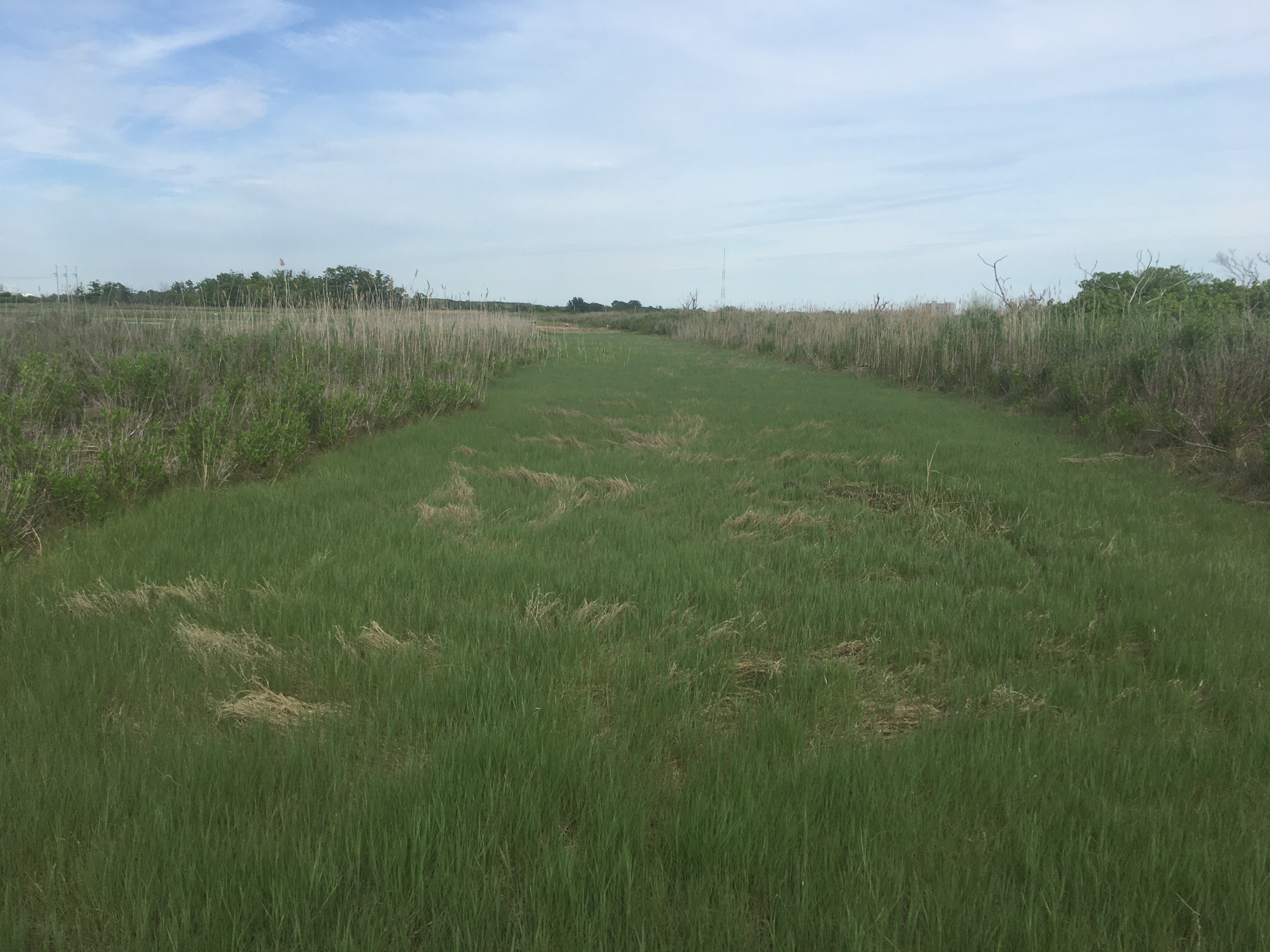
South side after second stream.

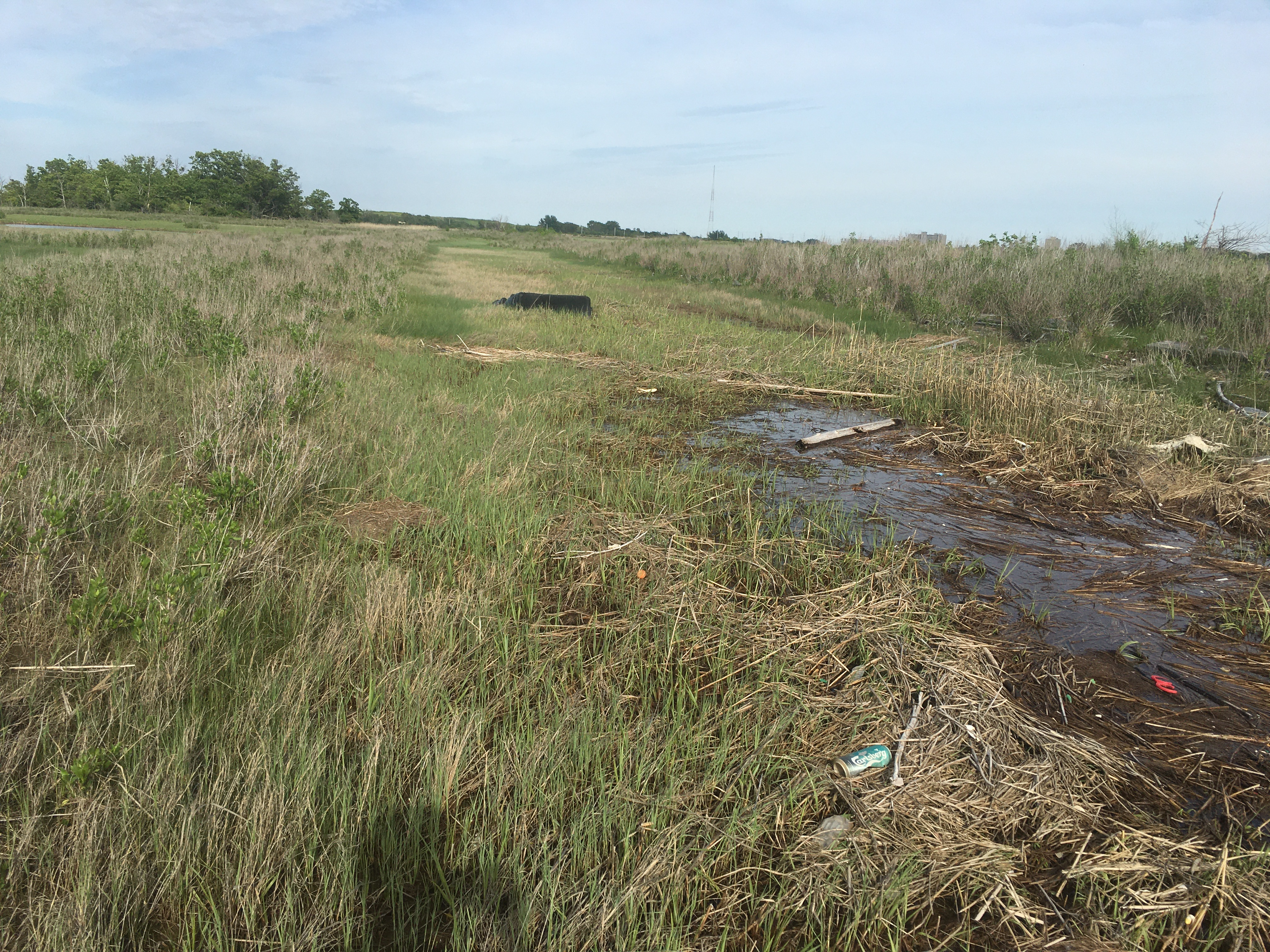
South side of race track continued.

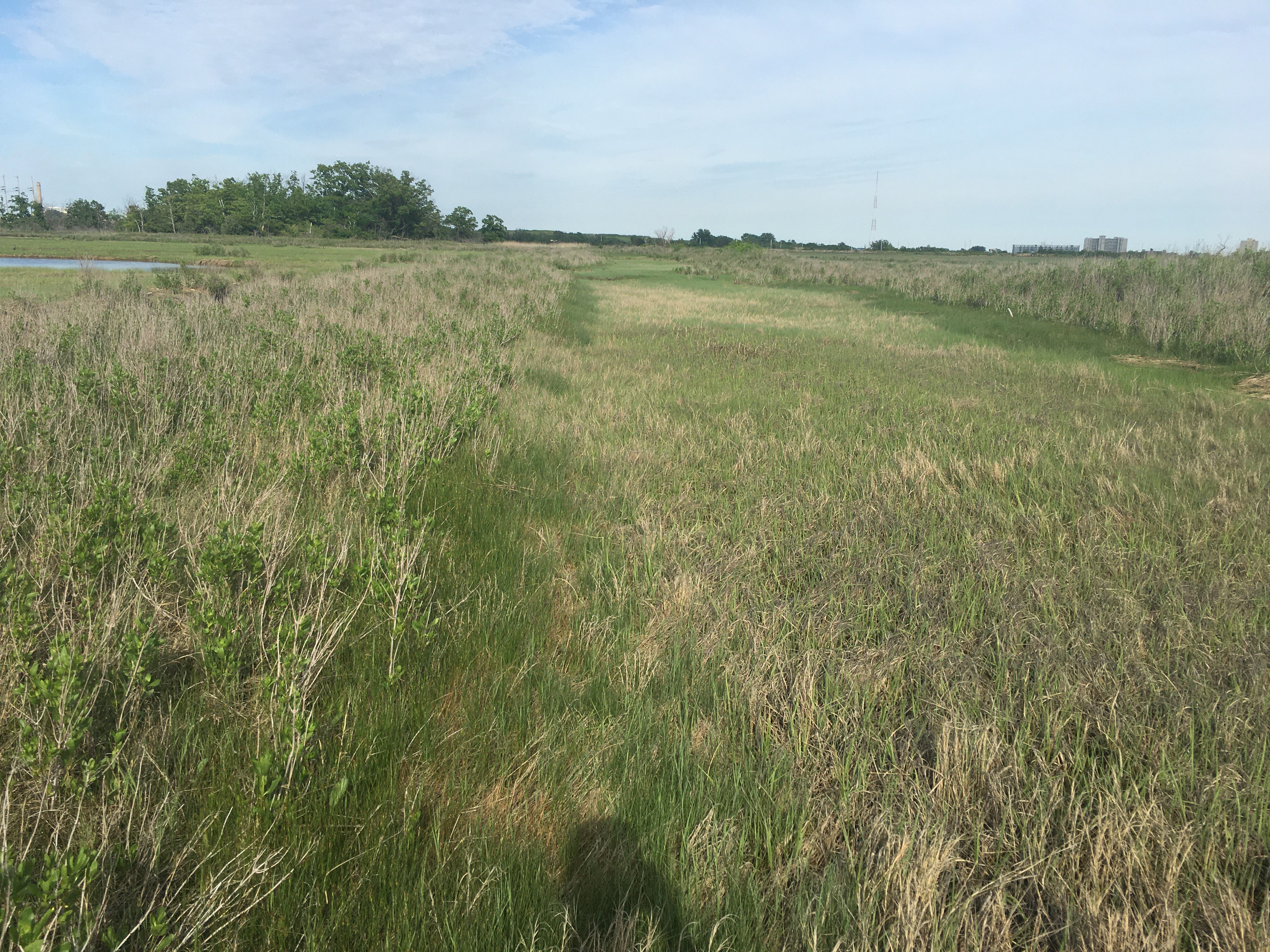
South side of race track. Continuing on farther from this location you'll come across tall-grass/reeds and then is the jungle where the ticks are.

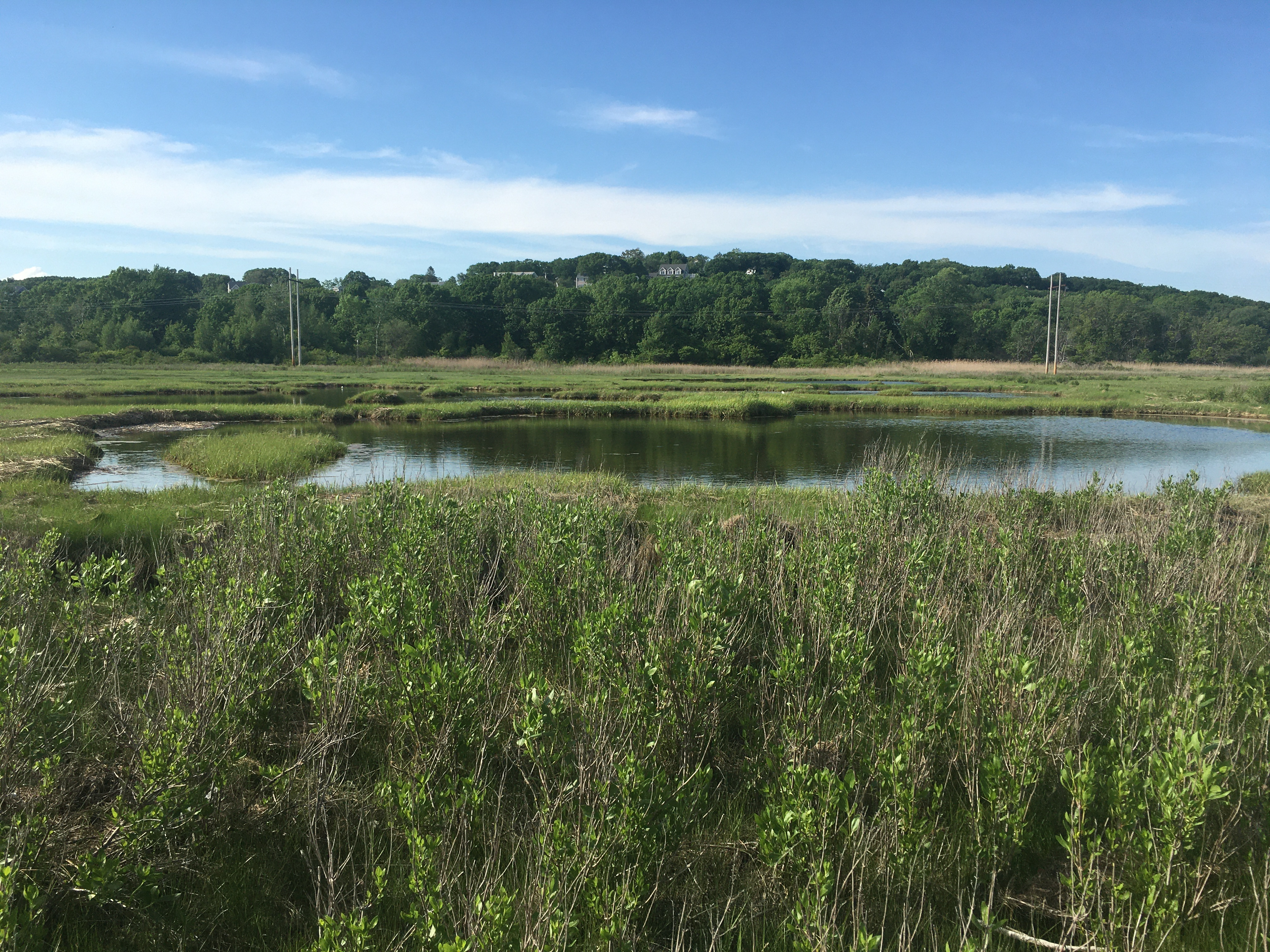
Small pond in the middle of the race track where Great Egrets and other birds can be observed.

== See also ==
- Saugus Field
