= Arch Freeman =

American pilot

- Born: Archibald A. Freeman c. 1890; Flushing, Queens
- Died: June 27, 1918 (aged 28); Moraine, Ohio
- Spouse: Helen Stevens (1912–1918)
- Aviation career
- Flight license: January 10, 1912; Dayton, Ohio

Archibald A. "Arch" Freeman (c. 1890 – June 27, 1918) was an American pilot during the early years of aviation.

== Early life ==
Freeman was born in Flushing, Queens to Mr. and Mrs. E. G. Freeman. His parents did not have a birth certificate issued for Freeman, but according to his widow he was born circa 1890. He attended public schools in Flushing.

== Flying ==
=== Instruction ===
Freeman attended the Wright Flying School on Long Island, New York, where he was instructed by Arthur L. Welsh. In addition to being Welsh's pupil, Freeman also served as his assistant. He assisted Welsh and did some flying during Robert J. Collier's October 1911 aerial exhibition at his estate outside Wickatunk, New Jersey. He later went to Dayton, Ohio, to train under Oscar Brindley. On January 10, 1912, he was granted a pilot's license (#84) by the Aero Club of America in Dayton, Ohio.

=== Atwood Park ===
That May he became an assistant flying instructor at the General Aviation Corporation flight school at Atwood Park in Saugus, Massachusetts. The school had more than any other aviation school in the country (43). Although the field's namesake, Harry Atwood, was the chief instructor, Freeman did most of the flying. His students included Jack McGee, H. Roy Waite, and Ruth Bancroft Law.

On May 20, 1912, Freeman and Waite took part in a mock bombing of Fort Heath, Fort Banks, and the battleships New Jersey and Rhode Island (which were anchored Boston Harbor) by dropping sacks of flour with a note stating "What if this bomb, instead of flour, contained nitroglycerin's deadly power?" onto the targets.

On May 25, 1912, Freeman and George C. Parker raced a Boston and Maine train in Lynn, Massachusetts. That afternoon he performed stunts over Revere Beach.

On May 30, May 31, and June 1, 1912, Freeman participated in an aviation meet at Atwood Park that included some of the biggest aviators in the country, including Atwood, Lincoln Beachey, and Philip W. Page. During the meet, Atwood was granted permission by the United States Postmaster General's office to operate an airmail route between Lynn and Saugus. Freeman attempted two deliveries. His first fell into the Atlantic Ocean. His second delivery, containing 2,000 letters and postcards, successfully arrived in Lynn Common.

On June 10, 1912, Atwood quit the flying school. The reasons given for his departure were that he could make more money in exhibition flights and he had become disenchanted with Freeman. Atwood took the school's only plane with him and as a result, the school closed.

=== Exhibition flying ===
After leaving Atwood Park, Freeman flew in exhibitions throughout New England and worked as a flying instructor for various companies. In 1912 he participated in a meet at Harvard Aviation Field that included Lincoln Beachey, Philip W. Page, Glenn L. Martin, Charles K. Hamilton, Blanche Stuart Scott, and Harriet Quimby. During the meet, Freeman raced Farnum Fish in a passenger-carrying event (which Fish won) and competed in a bombing event (which was won by Paul Peck), and performed aerial stunts with Martin, Hamilton, Page, and Fish. Because Freeman participated in the unsanctioned meet he was suspended by the Contest Committee of the Aero Club of America. The committee overturned his suspension later that year based on the "circumstances of this unusual case".

In the fall of 1912, Freeman performed at exhibitions in Chicago, Illinois, Newark, Ohio, Suffolk, Virginia, and Louisville, Kentucky.

In December 1912, Freeman married Helen Stevens of Brookline, Massachusetts. Stevens was not a fan of Freeman's flying and asked him to give it up. On February 24, 1913, Freeman announced that he was going to give up flying.

Freeman eventually returned to flying. From 1913 to 1915 he was an instructor at the Wright Company's flight school in Mineola, New York.

=== World War I, accident, and death ===
In 1916, Freeman became involved in a private aviation venture backed by Edward A. Deeds, Harold E. Talbott, Harold E. Talbott, Jr., and Charles F. Kettering which eventually became the Dayton-Wright Company. Freeman served as the assistant flight instructor at the company's school in McCook Field. After the Signal Corps took control of McCook Field, the company moved to South Field in Moraine, Ohio.

After the U.S. entered World War I the Dayton-Wright Company began manufacturing bomber and reconnaissance planes. Freeman was tasked with testing the planes. On June 27, 1918, the engine on Freeman's plane suddenly lost power during takeoff. However, he was able to land the plane. The mechanics went over the engine's fuel system and Freeman attempted another take off. The engine failed again, but Freeman was once again able to land it safely. The engine failed once more on the third takeoff, however a strong wind prevented Freeman from making the 360° turn needed to land the plane and it forcefully struck the ground. Freeman's head hit the instrument panel with such force that the ignition switches dug themselves into his head. He was driven to the nearest hospital where he was declared dead by an emergency room doctor.
