= Jack McGee (aviator) =

American pioneer aviator

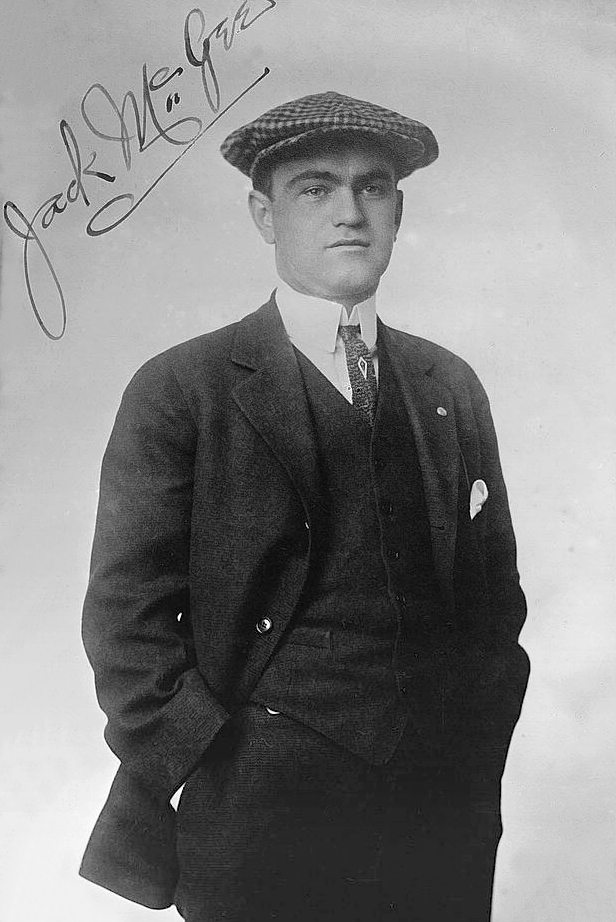
Jack McGee circa 1913

Jack McGee (1885 – June 13, 1918) was a pioneer aviator.

== Biography ==
McGee was born in 1885 in Central Falls, Rhode Island to Robert McGee. His family moved to Pawtucket, Rhode Island when he was 15 in 1900. He was a boxer and worked as an elevator operator and auto mechanic before working as a chauffeur for James C. McCoy. McGee took flying lessons from Harry Atwood and Arch Freeman at Atwood Park in Saugus, Massachusetts. The school closed before McGee could finish his training, but he believed that he had received enough instruction and purchased his own plane. He made his first solo flight in August 1912.

On 21 September 1913 McGee applied for admission to the Aero Club of America. The particular benefit of membership is the possession of a license which emanates from the European Aeronautical Federation. Capt Hugh L. Willoughby, a member of the club's committee on safety, directed the tests which included figure eights, making perfect landings and ascensions and reach an altitude of 164 feet, conducted the examination in Newport. In 1917, McGee went to work as a test pilot for the Gallaudet Aircraft Corporation.

On June 13, 1918 he was flying a floatplane low over Greenwich Bay when his pontoon dipped into the water, causing his plane to topple into the water where he drowned.

== Archive ==
His papers are archived at the Rhode Island Historical Society.
