= Ruth Law Oliver =

American pioneer aviator (1887–1970)

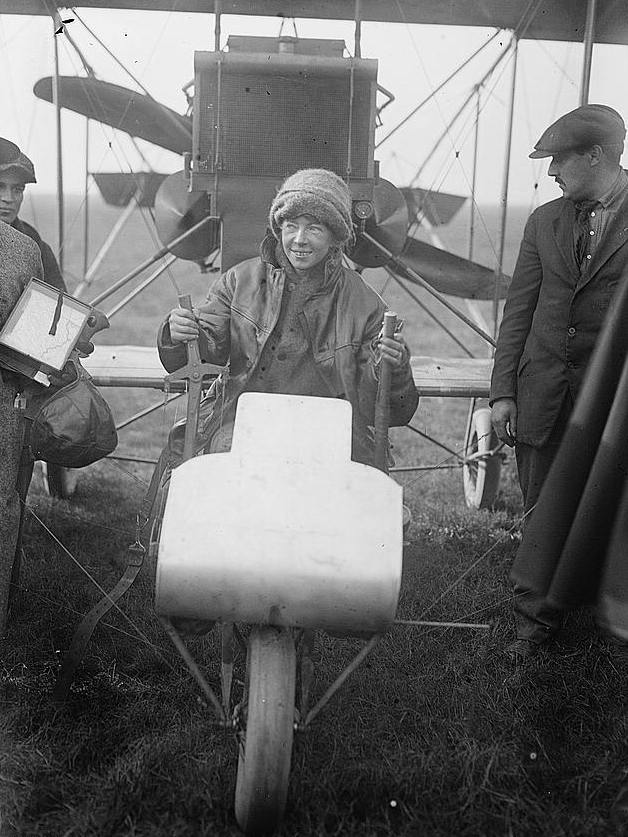
- Ruth Law arriving in New York after flight from Chicago, 1916
- Born: Ruth Bancroft Law; May 21, 1887; Lynn, Massachusetts, US
- Died: December 1, 1970 (aged 83); San Francisco, California, US
- Known for: Aviation pioneer
- Spouse: Charles Oliver
- Relatives: Rodman Law (brother)

Ruth Law Oliver (May 21, 1887 – December 1, 1970) was a pioneer American aviator during the 1910s.

== Early life and learning to fly (1887–1912) ==
She was born Ruth Bancroft Law on May 21, 1887, to Sarah Bancroft Breed and Frederick Henry Law in Lynn, Massachusetts.

She was inspired to take up flying by her brother, parachutist and pioneer movie stuntman Rodman Law, with whom she challenged herself to physically keep up during their childhood.

Law's first airplane was purchased directly from Orville Wright by her husband, but in her name. She was instructed by Harry Atwood and Arch Freeman at Atwood Park in Saugus, Massachusetts, having been refused lessons by Orville Wright because, according to Law, he believed that women weren't mechanically inclined, but this only made her more determined, later saying "The surest way to make me do a thing is to tell me I can't do it." She received her pilot's license in November 1912, the same year that she enrolled in Burgess Flying School and after moving to solo flights within just two months of enrollment. She was an adept mechanic, described by a reporter in her own time as being able to hear something wrong with her airplane and find her own solution to fix it.

== Early flying career (1915–1916) ==
In 1915, Law gave a demonstration of aerobatics at Daytona Beach, Florida, before a large crowd. She announced that she was going to "loop the loop" for the first time, and proceeded to do so, not once, but twice.

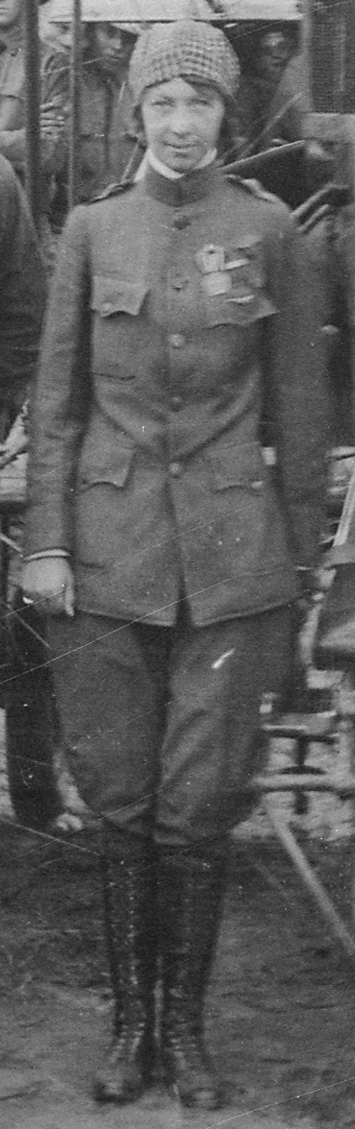
Ruth Law was the only woman in World War I permitted to wear the French government aviation uniform for nonmilitary purposes.

In 1915 she participated in a publicity stunt for baseball's Grapefruit League. Dodgers manager Wilbert Robinson and outfielder Casey Stengel heard that Law had been dropping golf balls from the sky for a nearby golf course and decided that a similar stunt would be good for publicity. On March 13, 1915, Law flew with Stengel on board (though, later, Stengel would recant his role in the tale, saying it was team trainer) ready to drop the baseball to Robinson's waiting mitt. But instead of a baseball, a grapefruit was flung out the plane, either as a prank or by mistake. The fruit shattered on impact, covering Robinson in the "ooze and goo" and making him believe he was injured and covered with blood. Fortunately, this was not the case, but a popular legend is that this incident was how the Grapefruit League earned its nickname.

In the spring of 1916, she took part in an altitude competition, twice narrowly coming in second to male fliers. She was furious, determined to set a record that would stand against men as well as women.

Her greatest feat took place on 19 November 1916, when she broke the existing cross-America flight air speed record of 452 miles (727 km) set by Victor Carlstrom by flying nonstop from Chicago to New York State, a distance of 590 miles (950 km). The next day she flew on to New York City. Flying over Manhattan, her fuel cut out, but she glided to a safe landing on Governors Island and was met by United States Army Captain Henry "Hap" Arnold (who changed her spark plugs in the Curtiss pusher), who would one day become Commanding General of the United States Army Air Forces. President Woodrow Wilson attended a dinner held in her honor on December 2, 1916. Later that same month, she was called upon to spell the word "liberty" in the air by the Statue of Liberty as it was being illuminated for the very first time.

== Involvement in World War I (1917–1918) ==
In January 1917, at the invitation of The New York World newspaper, Law and her husband steamed to France so she could assess the state of French aviation during World War I. According to her 1960 interview with Columbia University, the paper also wanted her to "bring back what I considered to be the best plane that they had." The United States, she said, was "being criticized for lagging [in aerial equipment]--this was 1916, before we got into the war. . . . So the New York World [gave] me $10,000 to spend for this plane." She purchased a Morane aircraft, brought it back to the States, and started flying it at a "little airfield outside of Boston" (page 31).

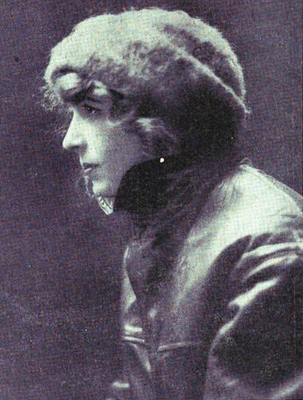
Ruth Law, from the cover of the May 5, 1917 issue of Billboard

After the United States entered World War I in April 1917, she campaigned unsuccessfully for women to be allowed to fly military aircraft, even petitioning President Wilson directly. Her specific application was for a commission in the United States Army Signal Corps. Stung by her rejection, she wrote an article entitled "Let Women Fly!" in the magazine Air Travel, where she argued that her success in aviation should prove a woman's fitness for work in the field.

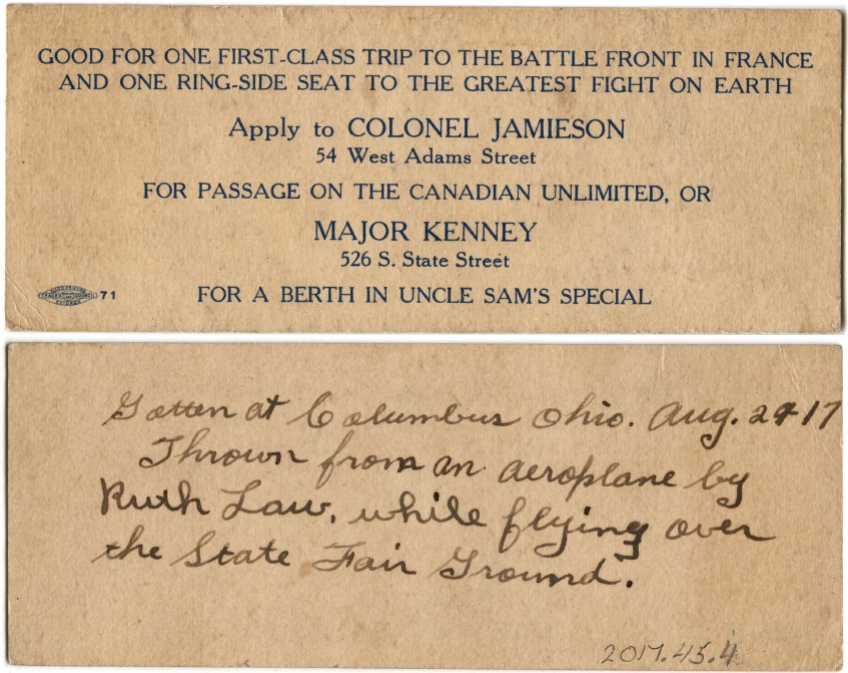
WWI military recruitment leaflet thrown from a plane by Ruth Law in 1917

Despite not being allowed to fly military aircraft, Law did use her flight skills to contribute to the war effort. During exhibitions, she threw flyers from her airplane to raise money for Liberty Loan drives and the Red Cross, as well as encouraging enlistment. To improve success, she was even given permission by the U.S. government to wear the Army's aviation uniform in 1917.

== Late career (1919–1922) ==
After the war, Law continued to set records while running her own plane barnstorming troupe, "Ruth Law's Flying Circus". After Raymonde de Laroche of France set a women's altitude record of nearly 13,000 feet (4,000 m) on 7 June 1919, Law broke Laroche's record on 10 June, flying to 14,700 feet (4,500 m). Laroche, in turn, broke Oliver's record on 12 June, flying to a height of 15,748 feet (4,800 m). That same year, Law became the first person to deliver official U.S. mail to the Philippines by air.

On a morning in 1922, Law woke up to read with surprise an announcement of her retirement in the newspaper; her husband had tired of her dangerous job and had taken that step to end her flying career. She acquiesced to his demand.

== Post-career life (1932–1970) ==
She attributed a 1932 nervous breakdown to the lack of flying, having settled down in Los Angeles, spending her days gardening.

In 1948, Law attended a Smithsonian event in Washington, D.C. celebrating the donation of the Wright brothers' Kitty Hawk plane, despite Orville Wright's earlier refusal to teach her. Notwithstanding her accomplished career in aviation, she traveled by train.

She died on December 1, 1970, in San Francisco. She is buried in Pine Grove Cemetery in Lynn, Massachusetts.

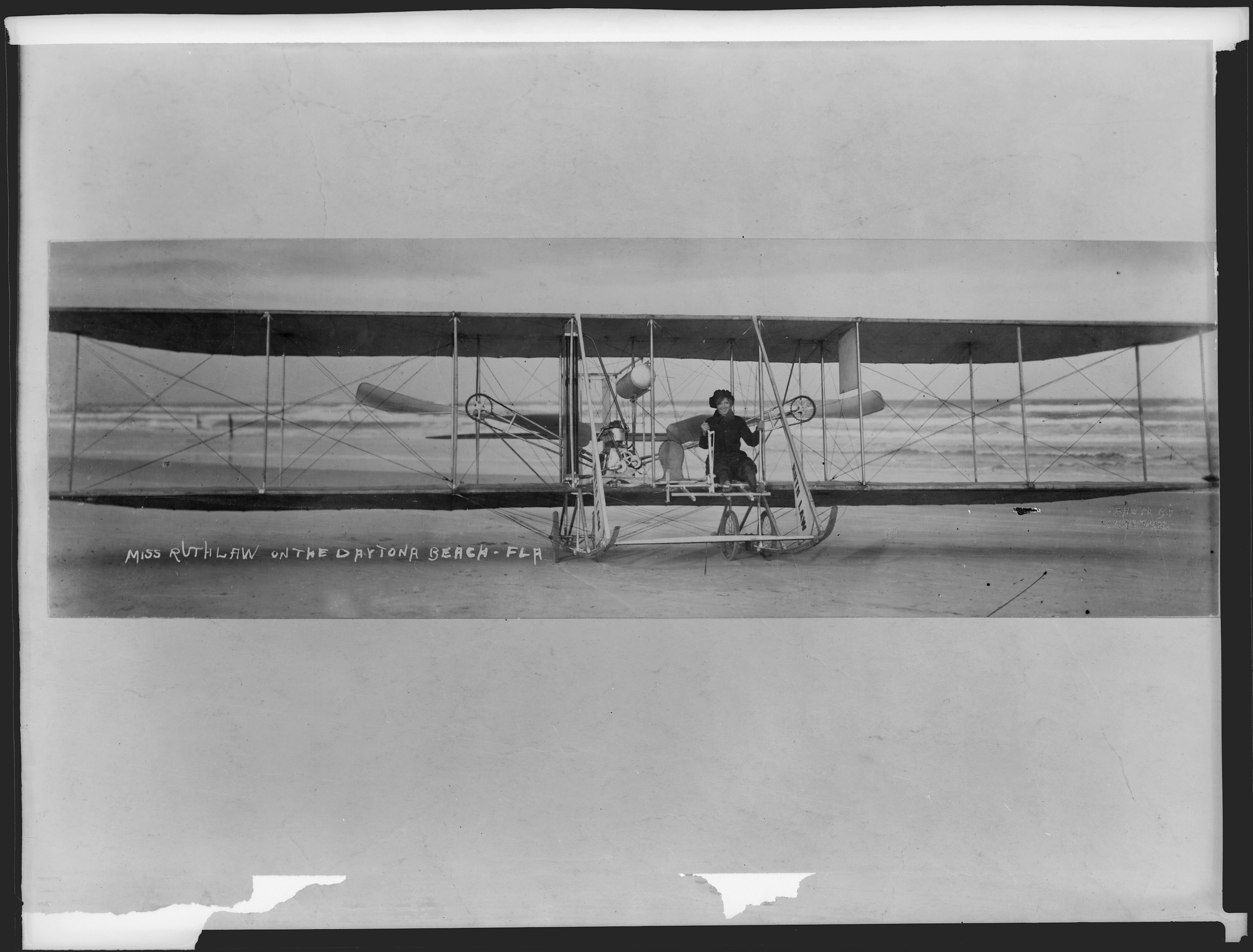
Law at Daytona Beach with her first plane, a Wright Model B

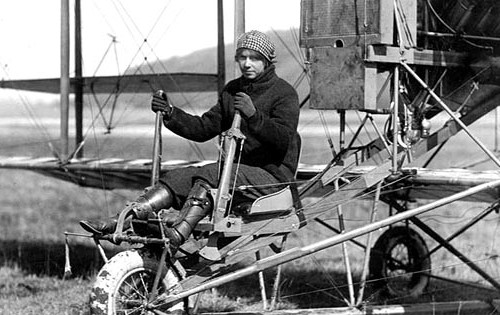
Ruth Law in 1915: Her aircraft is a Curtiss Pusher, but has Wright Brothers control levers.

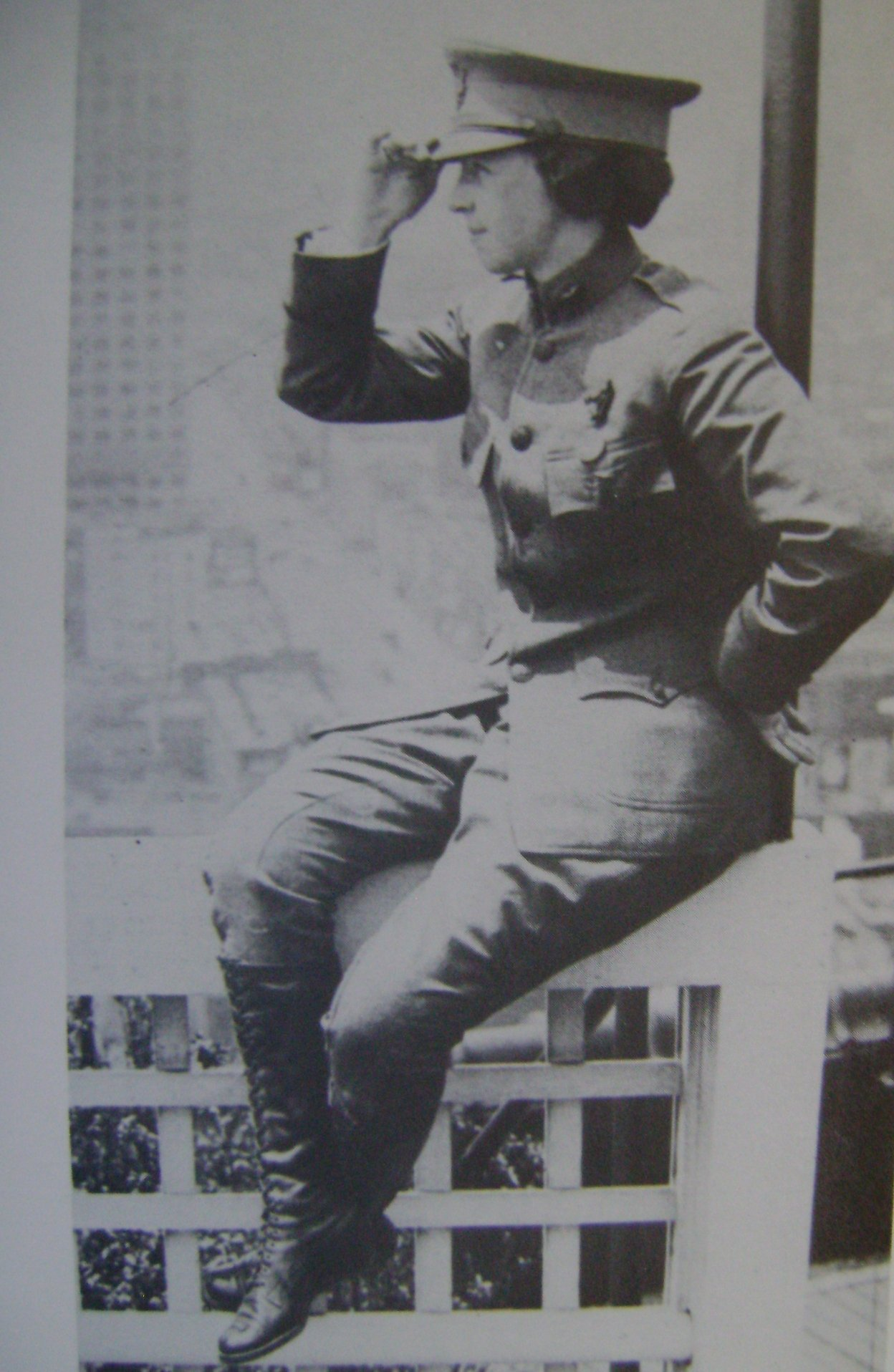
Ruth Law at the Hotel McAlpin, 1917

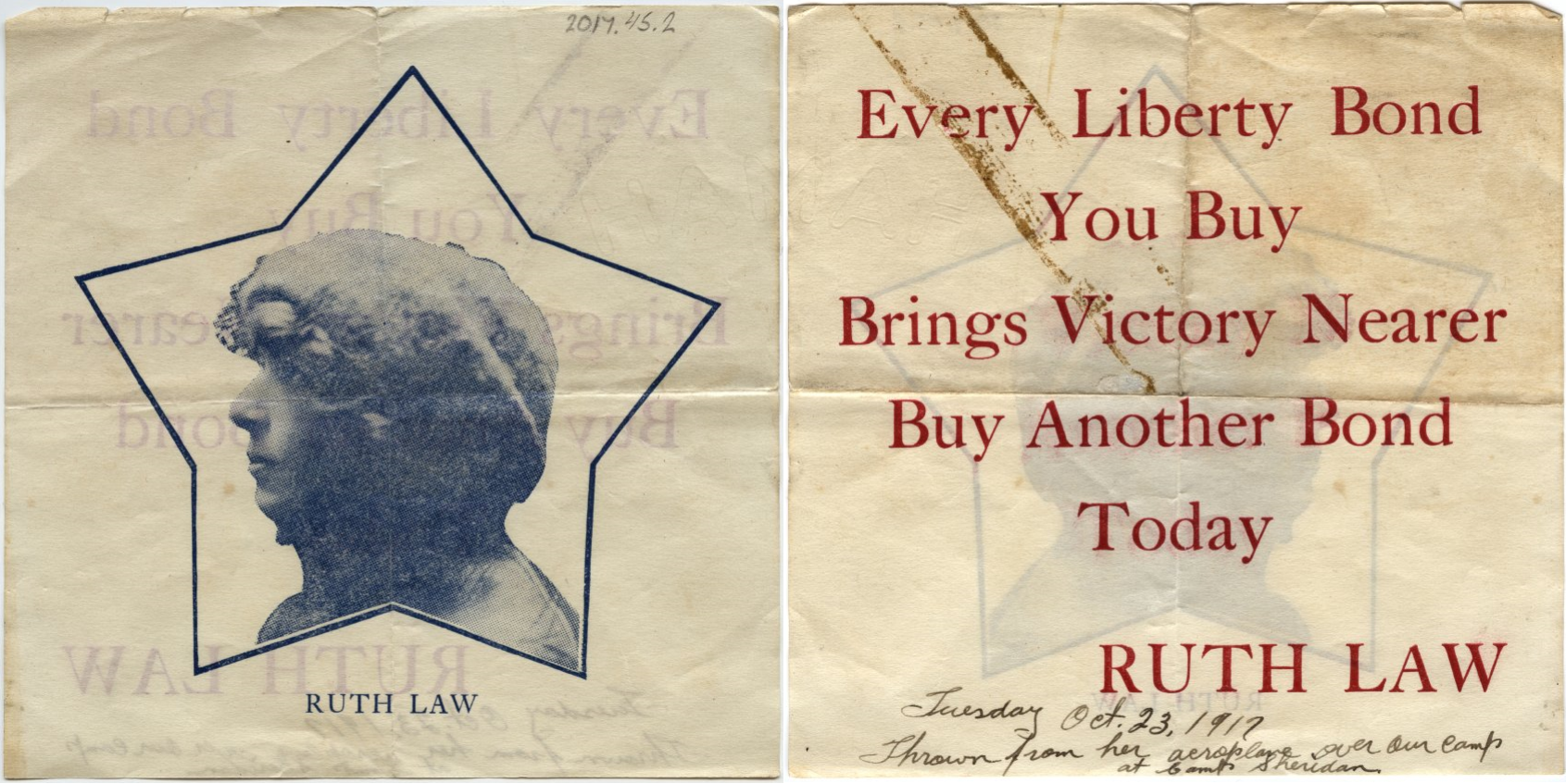
WWI liberty bond leaflet thrown from a plane by Ruth Law in 1917.

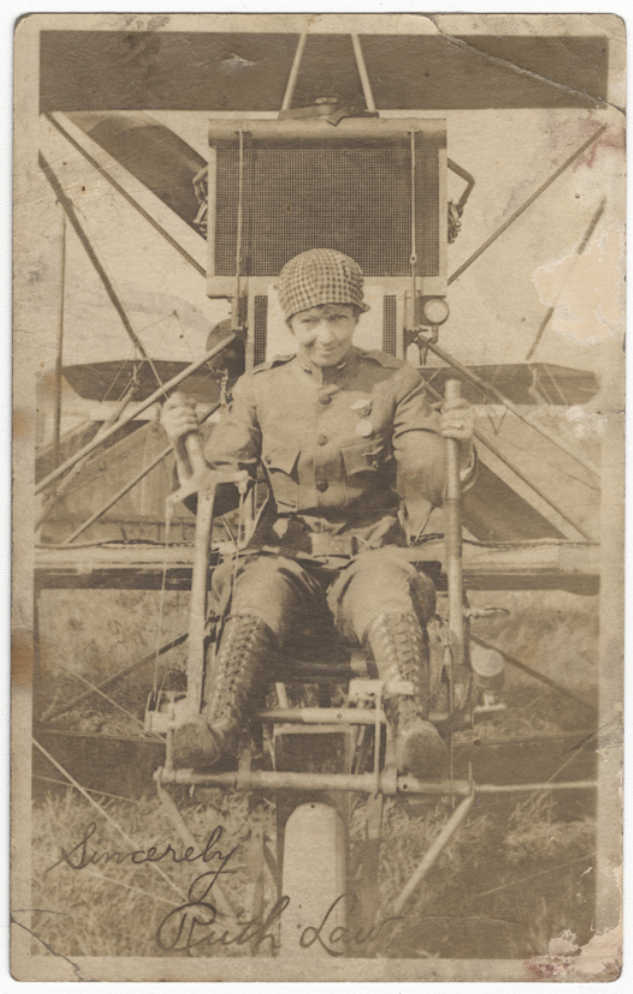
Photograph of Ruth Law sitting in an airplane while wearing a military uniform.
