= Farnum Fish =

Farnum Thayer Fish
- Born: October 5, 1896; Los Angeles, California, U.S.
- Died: July 3, 1978 (aged 81); Los Angeles, California, U.S.

Farnum Thayer Fish (5 October 1896 – 30 July 1978) was an early American airplane pilot known as the "Boy Aviator". He was, at the age of 15, the "youngest licensed aviator in the world".

== Early flying career ==
He was born in Los Angeles, California, on October 5, 1896, to a wealthy physician. Fish enrolled in the Wright Flying School near Dayton, Ohio, in 1911 at the age of 15. He stated in a 1971 newspaper article that he received four hours of lessons from Orville Wright. The book Orville's Aviators: Outstanding Alumni of the Wright Flying School, 1910-1916 states that he was taught by Arthur L. Welsh, the Wright Brothers' first flight instructor. On January 12, 1912, the Aero Club of America issued him Fédération Aéronautique Internationale Airplane Pilot's Certificate #85.

Fish immediately bought a Wright Model B biplane and had it shipped to California, where he flew it in an air meet at Dominguez Field in Los Angeles which ran from January 20 to 26, 1912. On January 21, he had a close call when "he plunged earthward from a height of 1000 feet [300 m], his biplane righting itself when less than 200 feet [61 m] from the ground". "The young flier ... stated that his machine dropped through a 'hole' in the air, and that he managed by desperate clinging to keep his seat until he encountered another current that bore him up."

Undeterred, he then participated in another meet at Emeryville, California Race Track, also in California, which lasted from February 17 to 21 of the same year. During this meet, he carried the first airmail to Oakland. Next came a small meet in April at the Coronado Polo Grounds in San Diego, where he again carried airmail. According to one source, it was here that Fish angered Glenn Curtiss when he landed without invitation on Curtiss's airfield.

On May 17, 1912, Fish was arrested "after landing his Wright Model B (with a woman passenger) in Grant Park" in Chicago. He avoided a fine by claiming engine trouble. The Milwaukee Journal sponsored his non-stop, 93-mile (150 km) flight from Cicero Field, Chicago along Lake Michigan to Milwaukee on May 25, carrying Journal newspapers, mail and 50 pounds (23 kg) or 300 pounds (140 kg) of silk consigned to a department store. He made the trip in record time, either 2 hours 18 minutes or 2 hours 20 minutes. On May 29, The New York Times reported he had "made a fifty-mile [80 km] flight from Milwaukee to Watertown, Wis., carrying newspapers to the cities en route. It was the first use of an aeroplane in the circulating of newspapers." The Journal stated that he had set a distance record for carrying a passenger, his mechanic Herbert Hazzard, on the return trip to Milwaukee.

On July 9, Fish wrecked his airplane while performing stunts at Revere Beach in Revere, Massachusetts. He lost control after a wing touched the water. Fish and his student Jack McGee were thrown 40 feet (12 m), landing in water deep enough to break their fall.

On July 31, Fish and a student survived a crash at Atwood Park in Saugus, Massachusetts after Fish's aircraft hit an air pocket, dropped 150 feet (46 m), crashed into a pole, turned upside-down and fell to the ground. Fish suffered only minor injuries, while Morris Shoemanhorne had a bruised head and a badly twisted right ankle.

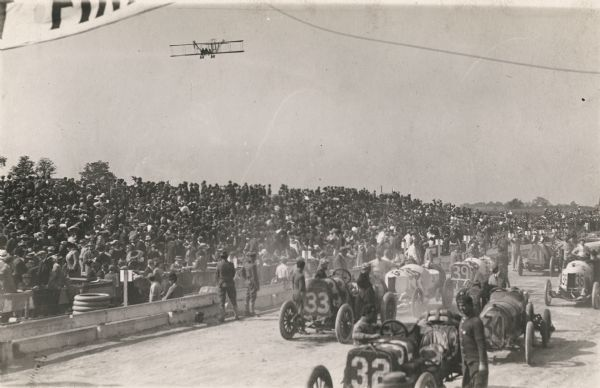
Fred Wagner took photographs of the 1912 American Grand Prize race from Fish's airplane, seen here, on October 5.

On October 6, the Milwaukee Journal reported that the "young birdman" had taken aloft photographer Fred Wagner to take aerial pictures of automobile races for "a large part of the six hours that the races lasted." The Boston Evening Transcript noted on November 15, 1912 that the Aero Club of America had suspended Fish's license until July 1, 1913 for "violation of the rule prohibiting flying over sporting events, games and other public assemblies. Both Beachey and Fish have been frequently reported as performing difficult and dangerous feats above crowds of spectators".

Fish was apparently something of a juvenile delinquent. The November 4, 1914 Oakland Tribune reported that he had been charged with trying to steal an automobile as a "Halloween joke", also noting that he had previously been involved "in several bizarre episodes which brought him to the notice of the Los Angeles juvenile court".

== Wounded for Pancho Villa ==
On May 15, 1915, Fish was flying reconnaissance for Pancho Villa during the Mexican Revolution. While 500 feet (150 m) over a large body of soldiers, he was shot at; one bullet entered his calf, passed through his thigh and ended up in his shoulder. He managed to return to his base before crashing in his bullet-ridden aircraft, making him, according to Dr. John H. Lienhard, Professor Emeritus of Mechanical Engineering and History at the University of Houston, "the first airplane casualty in the history of aerial warfare." Fish went home to recuperate, and was soon flying again.

On September 16, 1915, Wisconsin state fair visitors watched as Fish crashed into a pond. Fortunately, while his airplane was "badly damaged", the pilot escaped with cuts and bruises.

A special booklet for the 1916 reunion of Massachusetts Institute of Technology alumni listed among its program of activities "Flight by Farnum Fish in a Wright Biplane".

== Military service ==
With America's entry into World War I, he enlisted in the United States Army in February 1918 and was commissioned a lieutenant in July. In September, he was sent overseas as a test pilot for the Signal Corps, before being discharged in April 1919. He was a member of the Air Service Officers Reserve Corps from June 1919 to 1934, and returned briefly to active duty in 1942.

== Later life ==
After his military service, he became a businessman in Los Angeles. At the age of 74, he and his wife ran a statuary shop and lived in San Pablo, California.

Fish was a member of the Early Birds of Aviation.

He died on July 30, 1978.
