= Metropolitan District Commission =

Metropolitan District Commission may refer to:

- Metropolitan District Commission of Connecticut
- Massachusetts Water Resources Authority (one of two successor agencies for Metropolitan District Commission of Massachusetts)
- Department of Conservation and Recreation (one of two successor agencies for Metropolitan District Commission of Massachusetts)
