= Rumney Marsh Reservation =

State park in Massachusetts, US

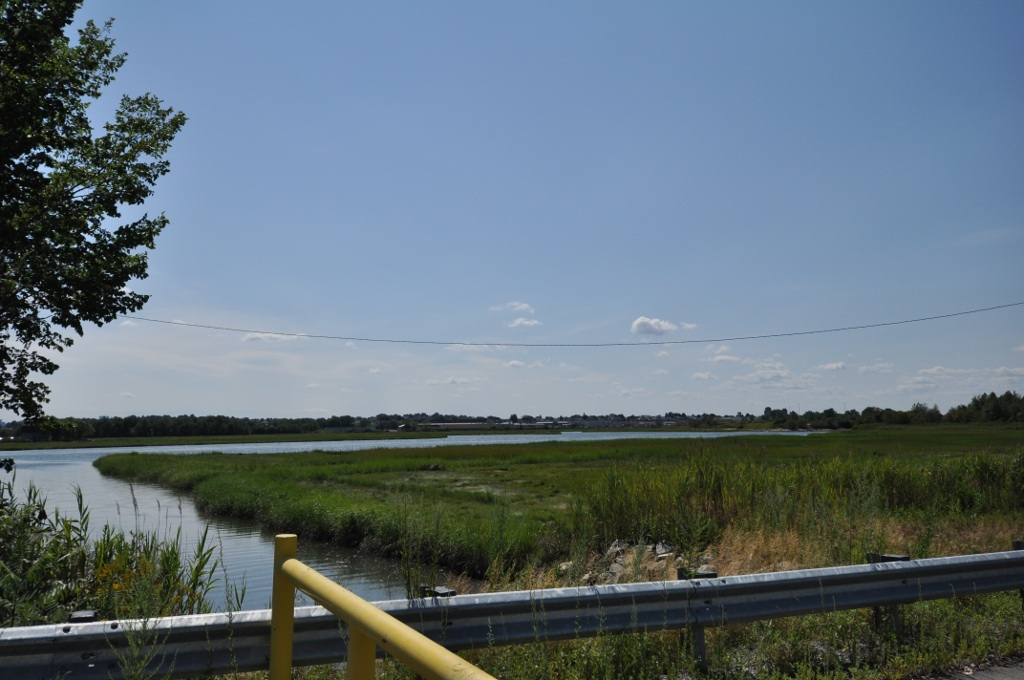
- The Pines River and surrounding marshland

- Location within Massachusetts Location within the United States
- Location: Essex and Suffolk counties, Massachusetts, United States
- Coordinates: 42°26′21″N 71°00′08″W
- Area: 815 acres (330 ha)
- Elevation: 7 ft (2.1 m)
- Administrator: Massachusetts Department of Conservation and Recreation
- Website: Official website

Rumney Marsh Reservation is a Massachusetts state reservation managed by the Massachusetts Department of Conservation and Recreation (DCR) in the town of Saugus and city of Revere. DCR's 2012 acreage listing records the reservation at 815 acres (330 ha), while the agency describes Rumney Marsh as a 600-acre (240 ha) salt marsh within the Saugus River and Pines River estuary.

The reservation forms part of the larger Rumney Marsh estuarine wetland complex and lies within the state-designated Rumney Marshes Area of Critical Environmental Concern (ACEC). The approximately 2,800-acre (1,100 ha) ACEC extends through Boston, Lynn, Revere, Saugus, and Winthrop, and includes both Rumney Marsh and Belle Isle Marsh.

== Geography and ecology ==
Rumney Marsh consists of extensive estuarine wetlands associated with the Saugus and Pines rivers. The Pines River is tidal throughout its length and flows through the marsh before joining the Saugus River near Point of Pines.

The Rumney Marshes Area of Critical Environmental Concern was designated by the Commonwealth of Massachusetts on August 22, 1988. The ACEC includes approximately 1,000 acres (400 ha) of salt marsh, tidal flats, and shallow subtidal channels. The marshes provide habitat for migratory and resident birds and marine organisms and serve as spawning and nursery habitat for fish. The wetlands also provide floodwater storage for surrounding low-lying communities.

The Commonwealth has identified at least five state-listed endangered, threatened, or special-concern species as occurring within the Rumney Marshes ACEC.

== Environmental history and restoration ==
Rumney Marsh has been substantially altered by filling, dredging, transportation infrastructure, landfills, and development. Mapping by the United States Environmental Protection Agency (EPA) estimated that approximately 1,258 acres (509 ha), or 43 percent of the original marsh, had been filled between 1803 and 2007, while an additional 87 acres (35 ha) had been dredged or excavated and converted to mudflat or open water.

Between 1967 and 1969, approximately 120 acres (49 ha) of Rumney Marsh were filled with about 6 million cubic yards (4.6 million m^{3}) of sand and gravel to construct a 2.4-mile (3.9 km) embankment for a planned extension of Interstate 95. The highway project was abandoned in 1972, but the embankment remained.

Construction of the embankment filled portions of the original meandering channels of the Pines River and severed the East Branch of the Pines River. A narrow rock-armored channel was left to provide drainage and tidal exchange for approximately 444 acres (180 ha) of wetlands west of the embankment. The concentration of tidal flows through limited openings at the embankment and other transportation crossings also contributed to increased water velocities and scour within the estuary.

=== Public ownership and linear park ===
After the abandoned highway land was no longer required for transportation purposes, it was retained in public ownership for flood-control and recreational purposes. On July 11, 1989, the Town of Saugus and the Metropolitan District Commission (MDC), a predecessor of DCR, entered into a Care and Control Agreement covering 60 acres (24 ha) in Saugus. An October 11, 1990, state environmental review certificate for a land transfer included an additional 83 acres (34 ha) in Saugus subject to the agreement.

Plans developed during this period contemplated the former I-95 embankment as a passive linear park. The property is now managed by DCR, and a walking trail follows the former highway embankment through the reservation.

=== Restoration projects ===
Removal of the abandoned highway fill and restoration of the marsh were identified as goals when the Rumney Marshes ACEC was designated in 1988. Portions of the embankment have since been excavated through a series of public works and environmental mitigation projects.

Beginning in the 1990s, projects including mitigation for the Central Artery/Tunnel Project, the United States Army Corps of Engineers Roughans Point Shore Protection Project and Saugus River Navigation Project, a Massachusetts Port Authority runway safety project, and DCR's Nahant Causeway improvements removed portions of the former highway fill and restored intertidal or salt-marsh habitat. The Massachusetts Department of Environmental Protection reported that restoration associated with mitigation for the Central Artery/Tunnel Project removed transportation fill, restored elevations and tidal flow, and resulted in an approximately 12.5-acre (5.1 ha) increase in salt marsh.

Between 2009 and 2012, three Route 107 bridges crossing Rumney Marsh were reconstructed with longer spans to improve tidal flow and flushing and reduce erosive conditions. The bridge elevations were also raised to improve recreational navigation.

In 2015, excavation for DCR's Winthrop Shores Beach Nourishment Project removed approximately 280,000 cubic yards (214,000 m^{3}) of additional embankment fill near Ballard Street. EPA reported that approximately 6.1 acres (2.5 ha) of wetlands subsequently developed within the excavated area. The project also included plans for recreational improvements along the remaining embankment, including a parking area at Ballard Street and public access to the linear trail.

By 2022, EPA estimated that embankment-removal projects had cumulatively restored approximately 37 acres (15 ha) of salt marsh and intertidal habitat, representing about 31 percent of the wetlands originally affected by the I-95 embankment footprint.

A 2022 EPA study examining additional removal of the abandoned embankment concluded that the remaining embankment does not reduce tidal flooding in East Saugus and that appropriately designed removal would not increase flooding over existing conditions. EPA identified further embankment removal as an opportunity to restore up to approximately 50 acres (20 ha) of additional salt marsh and intertidal habitat while reestablishing former tidal creeks, drainage patterns, and sheet flow. The agency also concluded that restoration of former drainage patterns could improve tidal flow and drainage to approximately 444 acres (180 ha) of wetlands upstream of the embankment and improve the marsh's resilience to rising sea levels.

== Activities and amenities ==
The reservation is open from dawn to dusk and provides opportunities for birdwatching, fishing, boating, hiking, and picnicking. DCR also offers natural and cultural history programs at the reservation.

The reservation's principal walking trail follows the former I-95 embankment. State planning documents describe a linear path running along the embankment from Ballard Street toward Bristow Street, and DCR interpretive programs use the relatively flat trail for walks of approximately three miles.

Parking and trail access are available at two locations in Saugus: a paved parking lot at 111 Ballard Street and a gravel parking lot at 114 Bristow Street, near Eastern Avenue. The Ballard Street parking area serves as a principal trailhead for the path along the former highway embankment.

DCR regulations for the reservation require visitors to remain on trails and prohibit motorized vehicles, camping, fires, alcohol, feeding wildlife, and removal of park resources.
