= William Landergan =

American politician and jurist (1899-1970)

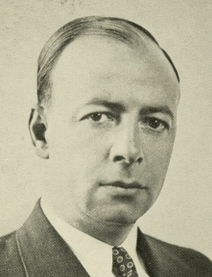
- Portrait of William Landergan

Member of the Massachusetts House of Representatives from the 10th Essex district
- In office 1935–1937
- Preceded by: C. F. Nelson Pratt
- Succeeded by: Frederick Willis

Personal details
- Born: August 28, 1899 Lynn, Massachusetts
- Died: April 15, 1970 (aged 70)
- Party: Democratic
- Education: Bentley School of Accounting and Finance; Boston University Law School
- Occupation: Lawyer; Politician; Judge

William Joseph Landergan (August 28, 1899 – April 15, 1970) was an American politician and jurist.

Landergan served as a member of the Massachusetts House of Representatives from 1935–1937 and later served as a judge in the Lynn District Court.

== See also ==
- 1935–1936 Massachusetts legislature
