= Harry Atwood =

American inventor, engineer, and aviation pioneer (1883–1967)

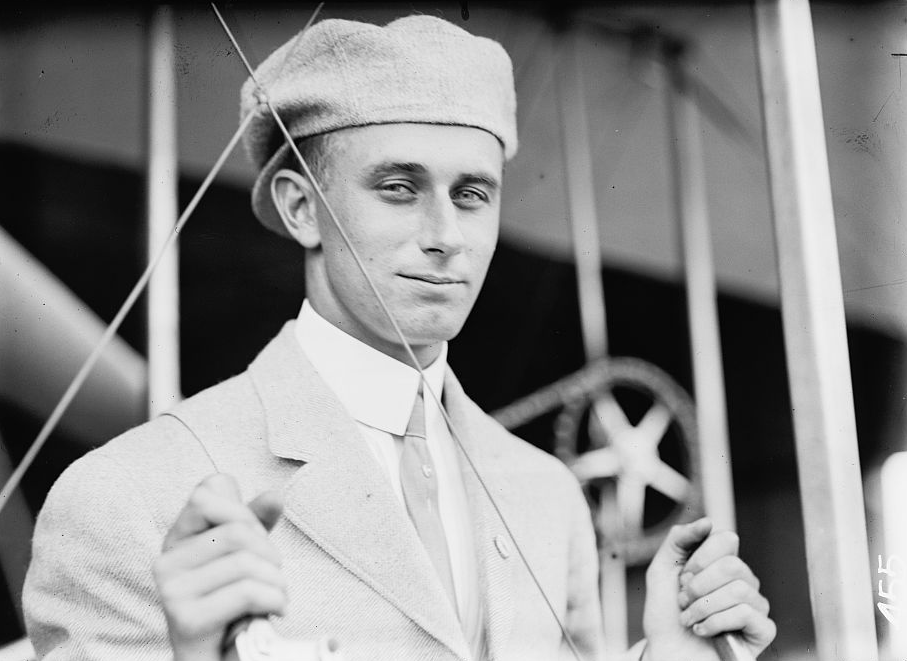
- Atwood circa 1913
- Born: November 15, 1883; Boston, Massachusetts, U.S.
- Died: July 14, 1967 (aged 83); Murphy, North Carolina, U.S.
- Resting place: Hanging Dog Baptist Church Cemetery, Murphy, North Carolina
- Education: Wright Flying School
- Spouses: Sarah Jenkins (divorced) Ruth Satterthwaite (m. 1914; died 1920) Helen Satterthwaite (divorced) Mary Dalton (died 1930) Nellie Pickens ()
- Children: 7

Harry Nelson Atwood (November 15, 1883 – July 14, 1967) was an American engineer and inventor known for pioneering work in the early days of aviation, including setting long-distance flying records and delivering the first air mail in New England.

== Early life ==
Atwood was born on November 15, 1883, in Roxbury, Boston, Massachusetts.

He trained at the Wright Flying School at Huffman Prairie, near Dayton, Ohio, with fellow students Thomas D. Milling, Calbraith Perry Rodgers and Henry H. Arnold. Within three months of his first lesson he flew a record-breaking 576 miles (927 km) from Boston to Washington, D.C., and on July 14, 1911, landed on the White House lawn. A prize of $10,000 was offered to Atwood to fly between Chicago and Milwaukee on August 10. Between August 14, 1911, and August 25, 1911, he flew 1,256 miles (2,021 km) from St. Louis to New York City, making 11 stops and spending 28 hours 31 minutes in the air. Atwood funded his flying activities with the sale of two different electric meter designs to General Electric.

== Aviation career ==
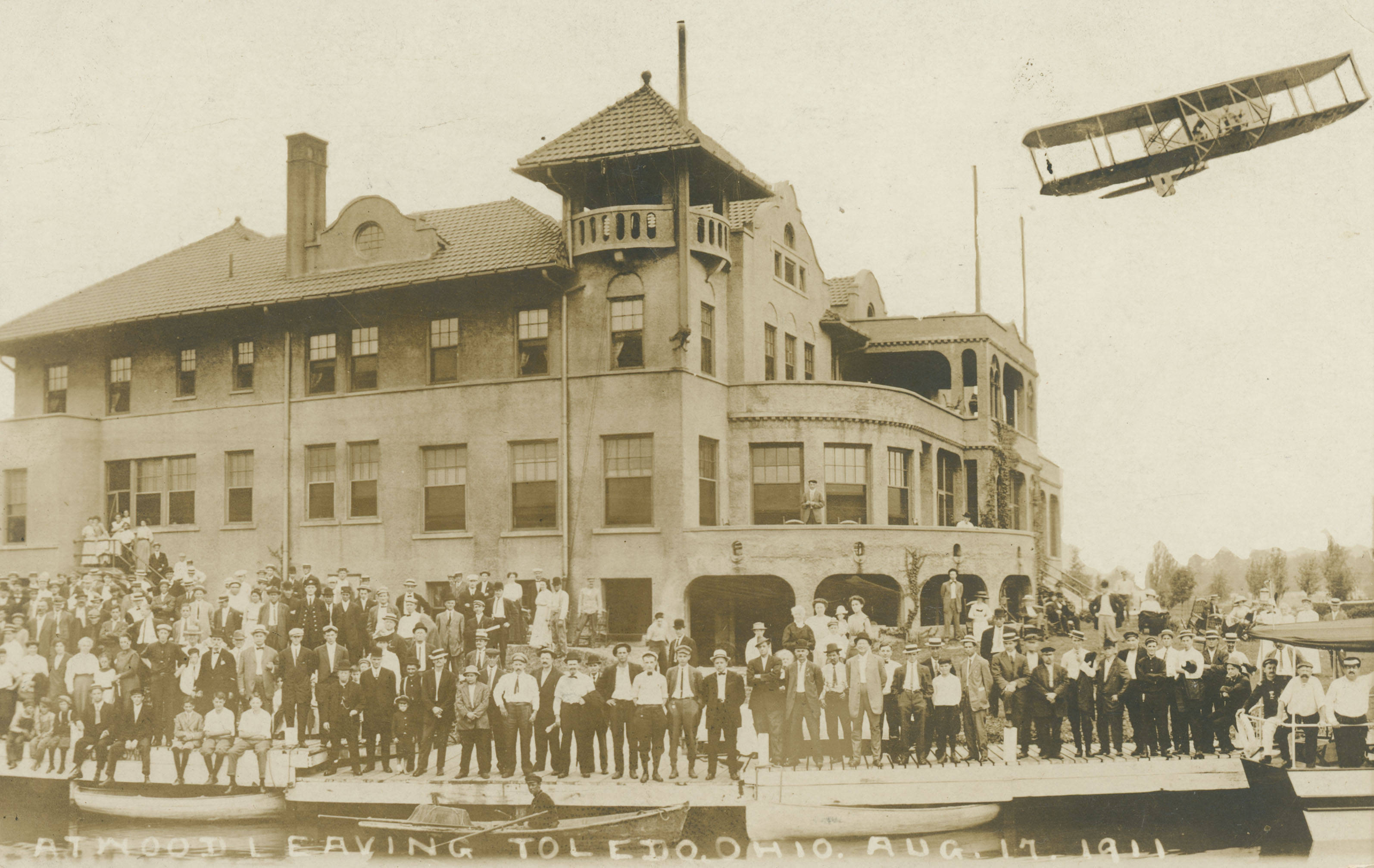
Atwood Leaving Toledo, Ohio on August 17, 1911

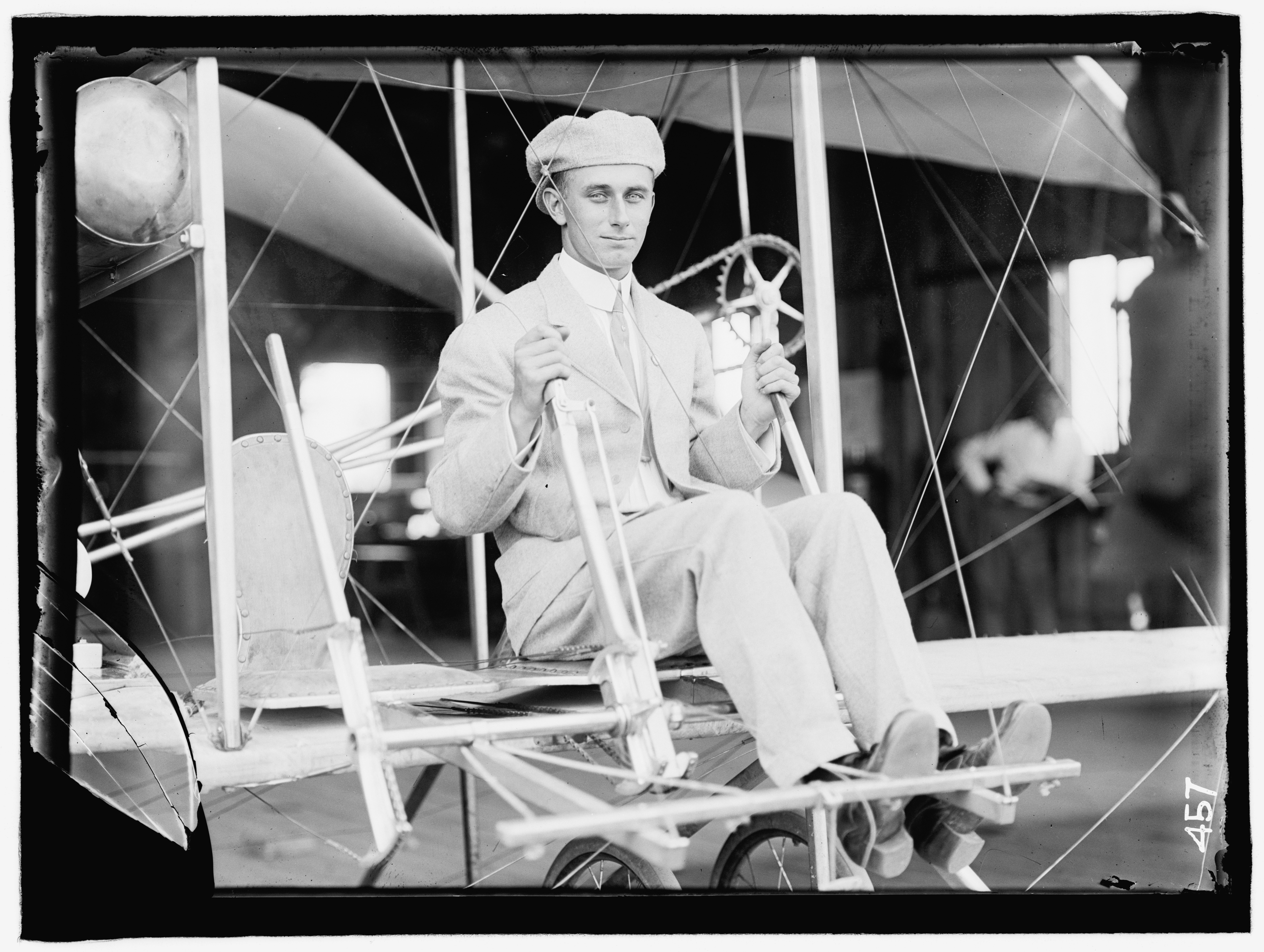
Atwood in 1911

Straight out of flight school in May 1911, Atwood became the chief flight instructor for William Starling Burgess whose Burgess Company built a variety of airplanes, including licensed Wright aircraft between 1911 and 1913. In 1912, Atwood signed with the General Aviation Corporation for three years. The company purchased Franklin Park race track in Saugus, Massachusetts, and converted it into an airfield, which they named after Atwood. Atwood served as the chief instructor of the company's flight instruction school there from the time it opened until he quit on June 10, 1912, because he could make more money in exhibition flights and because he was disenchanted with fellow instructor Arch Freeman. On May 31, 1912, Atwood made the first airmail delivery in New England. He flew about five miles (8 km) from Atwood Park to the Lynn Common in Lynn, Massachusetts where he dropped a sack of mail from the plane. The sack was then retrieved by a Lynn postal employee and driven to the post office.

== Plastic planes ==
Harry Atwood was also a pioneer whom the Massachusetts Institute of Technology and other authorities called "The Father of Plastic Planes." He introduced a somewhat revolutionary method of constructing a plane by molding wood veneers treated with cellulose acetate. He began working on his in 1912 when he was searching for aircraft materials that were cheap and abundant, possessed essential strength-to-weight requirements, and lent themselves to mass production of the larger aircraft assemblies such as complete wings and hole fuselages, as an integral one-piece structure.

The monocoque, or single shell, fuselage was one of his great hopes. The general idea of his thinking was a practice used by the ancient Egyptians. Skilled cabinet makers employed plywood and glue which produced a light, strong, and durable wood by taking two thin flat panels of wood, laying the grain of each sheet at right angles to each other, and then sticking them together with a bonding agent. Atwood experimented with wood processed in a similar manner forming the wood into complex shapes using molds and mandrels. The plane he successfully completed and flew in 1912 used this technique, but it failed in one important respect. The strongest albumen glue of the time was used as the bonding agent but did not hold up well in weather and came apart in the rain.

Eight years later, Atwood unveiled his second plastic plane. Great improvements had been made in albumen glues such as the waterproof albumen glue made by Henry L. Haskell, but there were still bonding problems. He and his followers of this technique for aircraft manufacturing felt that a plastic or synthetic resin would solve the bonding problems. Others continued Atwood's vision which led to improvements in glues and molding, including Virginius E Clark's Duramold process, Gene Vidal's Weldwood process, and Timm Aircraft's Aeromold process.

== Personal life ==
Atwood was married five times. His first marriage was to Sarah Jenkins of Lynn, Massachusetts. The union resulted in two children: Edgar, who died at the age of 3 days, and Bethany. The couple later divorced.

On March 2, 1914, Atwood married Ruth Satterthwaite in a courthouse ceremony in her hometown of Reading, Pennsylvania. The couple had three children, Katrina, Gene, and Ruth. Atwood and his wife remained wed until she died in October 1920 at the age of 27.

His third wife, Helen Satterthwaite, was the widow of Ruth's brother. They were married for 90 days before divorcing. His fourth wife, Mary Dalton died shortly after giving birth to their son, Harry, Jr., in 1930. Harry, Jr. was raised by a minister and his wife. His fifth wife was his housekeeper Nellie Pickens. They had one daughter, Nelda Stiles. Atwood died on July 14, 1967, in Murphy, North Carolina, at age 83.
