= H. Roy Waite =

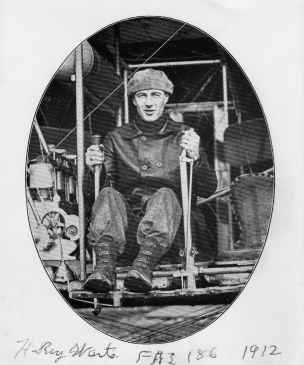
Waite in 1912

Henry Roy Waite (October 3, 1884 - December 18, 1978) was an aviation pioneer. He was one of the first aircraft inspectors for the United States Navy. He later restored the Wright Flyer for display in the Smithsonian.

== Biography ==
He was born on October 3, 1884, in Boston, Massachusetts, to Julia C. and Horace Waite. He died on December 18, 1978, in Winthrop, Massachusetts .
