= Belden Bly =

American politician (1914–2006)

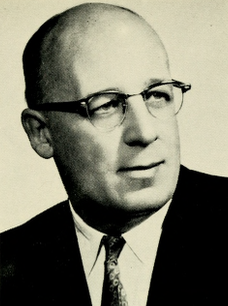

Member of the Massachusetts House of Representatives from the Saugus district
- In office 1949–1981
- Preceded by: Frederick Willis
- Succeeded by: Steven Angelo

Personal details
- Born: September 29, 1914 Everett, Massachusetts, US
- Died: November 3, 2006 (aged 92) Wakefield, Massachusetts, US
- Party: Republican
- Education: Dartmouth College; Boston University; Suffolk University
- Occupation: Teacher, Lawyer

Belden Gerald Bly Jr. (September 29, 1914 in Everett, Massachusetts – November 3, 2006 in Wakefield, Massachusetts) was an American teacher and member of the Massachusetts House of Representatives for 16 terms from 1949 to 1980, representing Saugus, Massachusetts.

Bly was born in Everett and grew up in Revere, Massachusetts. He graduated from Dartmouth College in 1938. He received a master's degree in education from Boston University in 1941 and a law degree from Suffolk University in 1955.

Bly was a Rockefeller Republican; a social liberal, but conservative on matters such as the economy and national defense. In 1974, he championed the creation of a non-smoking section of the House. Bly served on the Ways and Means Committee and the Committee on Aging.

Bly also was a biology and practical law teacher, as well as a coach for the golf, baseball, basketball, football and track teams at Saugus High School. Bly taught at the New England School of Law until his retirement in 1979.

The Belden Bly Bridge, the oldest cantilever bridge in the nation, which carries Route 107 over the Saugus River was renamed after him in 1985.

Bly kept a law office in Saugus and handled cases until his death in 2006.

Belden Bly electoral history

1968 General Election for the Massachusetts House of Representatives, 11th Essex District

- Belden Bly (R) - 6,059 (53.9%)
- Maurice Cunningham (D) - 5,188 (46.1%)

1972 General Election for the Massachusetts House of Representatives, 11th Essex District

- Belden Bly (R) - 5,686 (48.0%)
- James F. Reynolds, Jr. (D) - 3,819 (32.4%)
- David A. Dwyer (I) - 2,319 (19.6%)

1974 General Election for the Massachusetts House of Representatives, 11th Essex District

- Belden Bly (R) - 5,131 (55.8%)
- John Gould (D) - 4,062 (44.2%)

1976 General Election for the Massachusetts House of Representatives, 11th Essex District

- Belden Bly (R) - 6,644 (54.1%)
- John Gould (D) - 5,129 (41.7%)
- Pasquale Pignato (I) - 517 (4.2%)

1978 General Election for the Massachusetts House of Representatives, 9th Essex District

- Belden Bly (R) - 6,961 (51.1%)
- Steven Angelo (D) - 6,643 (48.8%)

== See also ==
- Massachusetts legislature: 1949–1950, 1951–1952, 1953–1954, 1955–1956
- Massachusetts House of Representatives' 9th Essex district
- Massachusetts House of Representatives' 11th Essex district
