= Donald Wong =

American politician

Member of the Massachusetts House of Representatives from the 9th Essex district
- Incumbent
- Assumed office January 5, 2011
- Preceded by: Mark Falzone

Chairman of the Saugus, Massachusetts Board of Selectmen
- In office 2007–2011
- Preceded by: Peter A. Rossetti, Jr.
- Succeeded by: Scott Crabtree

Personal details
- Born: January 15, 1952 (age 74)
- Party: Republican
- Spouse: Jeannie Wong
- Education: Taiwan Normal University
- Occupation: Businessman; Restaurant owner
- Website: Donald H. Wong.com

Donald H. Wong (born January 15, 1952) is an American businessman and politician. A member of the Republican Party, Wong has represented the 9th Essex District in the Massachusetts House of Representatives since 2011. His constituency consists of parts of Lynn, Lynnfield, Wakefield and Saugus. He is also the President of Mandarin House, Inc., which manages the Kowloon Restaurant.

== Background and education ==
Wong was born on January 15, 1952, to William Wong and Madeline C. Wong. Wong is a third-generation Chinese American. He attended Belmont High School and Taiwan Normal University.

== Career ==
Wong served as a member of Saugus Town Meeting from 2005 to 2007 and as Chairman of the Saugus Board of Selectmen from 2007 to 2011. He has also been a member of the Massachusetts Asian American Commission.

On November 2, 2010, Wong defeated Democratic incumbent Mark Falzone by 382 votes. He and 2nd Norfolk District Representative Tackey Chan were the first Asian-Americans elected to the Massachusetts Legislature. Wong is a member of the House Ways and Means Committee, a ranking member of the Joint Committee on Transportation, and a member of the House Committee on Personnel and Administration. He was reelected unopposed in 2012, defeated Democrat Christopher Finn in 2014, 60.5% to 39.4%, and defeated Democrat Jennifer Migliore in 2016 54.5% to 44.7%.

== Personal life ==
Wong and his wife Jeannie have three children and seven grandchildren.

== Electoral history ==
Donald Wong electoral history

2010 Republican primary for the Massachusetts House of Representatives, 9th Essex District

- Donald H. Wong - 1,854 (80.5%)
- Raymond A. Igou, III - 423 (18.4%)

2010 General Election for the Massachusetts House of Representatives, 9th Essex District

- Donald Wong (R) - 8,943 (51.0%)
- Mark Falzone (D) - 8,560 (48.9%)

2014 General Election for the Massachusetts House of Representatives, 9th Essex District

- Donald Wong (R) - 9,721 (60.5%)
- Christopher J. Finn (D) - 6,331 (39.4%)

2016 General Election for the Massachusetts House of Representatives, 9th Essex District

- Donald Wong (R) - 12,816 (54.5%)
- Jennifer Migliore (D) - 10,513 (44.7%)

2018 General Election for the Massachusetts House of Representatives, 9th Essex District

- Donald Wong (R) - 11,647 (62.1%)
- Matthew Crescenzo (D) - 6,373 (34.0%)
- Michael Coller (I) - 730 (3.9%)

== See also ==
- 2019–2020 Massachusetts legislature
- 2021–2022 Massachusetts legislature
- 2023–2024 Massachusetts legislature
