= Art Statuto =

American football player (1925–2011)

No. 22, 21
- Position: Center

Personal information
- Born: July 17, 1925; Saugus, Massachusetts, U.S.
- Died: March 2, 2011 (aged 85); Carrollton, Texas, U.S.
- Listed height: 6 ft 2 in (1.88 m)
- Listed weight: 221 lb (100 kg)

Career information
- High school: Saugus
- College: Notre Dame (1942–1944, 1946–1947)
- NFL draft: 1948: 31st round, 292nd overall pick

Career history
- Buffalo Bills (1948–1949); Los Angeles Rams (1950)

Awards and highlights
- 3× National champion (1943, 1946, 1947)

Career NFL/AAFC statistics
- Games played: 38
- Games started: 27
- Fumble recoveries: 1
- Stats at Pro Football Reference

Arthur John Statuto (July 17, 1925 – March 2, 2011) was an American professional football center who played for the Los Angeles Rams of the National Football League (NFL) and the Buffalo Bills of the All-America Football Conference (AAFC). He was drafted by the Philadelphia Eagles in the 31st round (292nd overall) of the 1948 NFL Draft.
