= Dave Lucey =

American football player and coach (1915–1997)

Massachusetts Registrar of Motor Vehicles
- In office 1972–1974
- Preceded by: Richard E. McLaughlin
- Succeeded by: Robert A. Panora

Personal details
- Born: January 20, 1915 Dover, New Hampshire
- Died: February 20, 1997 (aged 82) Beverly, Massachusetts
- Party: Democratic
- Education: Boston College
- Profession: Football coach Insurance agent

David J. Lucey (January 20, 1915 – February 20, 1997) was an American football player and coach and a civil servant who served as Massachusetts Registrar of Motor Vehicles from 1972-1974.

A native of Dover, New Hampshire, Lucey played football for the Boston College Eagles from 1937 to 1939. He spent most of his college career as a reserve quarterback, but stepped in to start on November 18, 1939 due to an injury to Henry Toczylowski. He was a member of the Eagles team that played in the 1940 Cotton Bowl.

In 1943, Lucey was hired to coach baseball at St. Mary's of Waltham, Massachusetts. Later that year he moved to Saugus High School, where he became the head football coach. In Lucey's four seasons as head coach, Saugus had a 25–12–4 record and were Class B co-champions in 1944. In addition to serving as Saugus High School's football coach, Lucey also served on the town's school committee and board of assessors. In 1952, Lucey opened an insurance agency in Saugus.

In 1947, Lucey returned to Boston College as an assistant football coach. In 1948 he became the athletic department's first full-time director of public relations. He left BC in 1951, but returned to coaching in 1954 at St. Mary's High School. The following season he moved to Peabody Veterans Memorial High School. In 1958 he took the same job at St. John's Preparatory School.

Lucey was a golfing partner and fundraiser for Governor Francis W. Sargent. During the 1970 Massachusetts gubernatorial election he served as the head of "Democrats for Sargent". In 1970, Sargent appointed Lucey to the State Appellate Tax Board and the Motor Vehicles Legal Liability Appeal Board. On July 16, 1971, Lucey was named Massachusetts Registrar of Motor Vehicles. In 1975, Lucey was replaced by Sargent's successor Michael Dukakis.

On February 20, 1997, Lucey died of a heart attack at Beverly Hospital in Beverly, Massachusetts. He was 82 years old.
