= Robin Hamilton =

Robin Hamilton may refer to:

- Robin Hamilton (politician), member of the Montana House of Representatives
- Robin N. Hamilton, American journalist, writer and television host
