= Saugus Middle-High School =

Coordinates: 42°27′39.4″N 71°1′21.1″W

Location
- 1 Pearce Memorial Drive; Saugus, MA 01906; United States

Information
- Type: Public
- School district: Saugus Public Schools
- Principal: Dr. Carla Scuzzarella
- Teaching staff: 52.40 (FTE)
- Grades: 6–12
- Enrollment: 727 (2023-2024)
- Student to teacher ratio: 13.87
- Colors: Red, white, and black
- Athletics conference: Northeastern Conference (NEC)
- Mascot: Sachem
- Rival: Peabody
- Website: middlehigh.saugus.k12.ma.us

Saugus Middle-High School is an American public secondary school located in Saugus, Massachusetts, United States. It is a part of Saugus Public Schools.

== Facilities ==
=== High school ===
Prior to the construction of a dedicated High School building, Saugus High classes were held in the Town Hall (now an American Legion hall) and the top floor of the Roby School.

From 1906 to 1955, Saugus High School was located on the corner of Central and Winter Streets. The building was expanded several times to accommodate the growing student population. The next Saugus High campus opened in September 1955. The single-story structure included a cafeteria, auditorium, offices, classrooms, and a gymnasium. The 1906 High School was a junior high school and elementary school until a 1963 arson. Only the 1935 addition survived, which remained an elementary school until 2003. In the summer of 2020, the 1955 Saugus High School was demolished to make way for a new sports complex.

The current Saugus Middle-High campus opened in 2020. Construction began on the northern portion of the school's property for a new complex in late 2018. The complex is occupied by both Saugus High School and Saugus Middle School and can hold up to 1,360 students. The Saugus Middle-High School was completed almost two years later in early 2020 with high school students officially moving into the new complex in April 2020.

=== Middle school ===
Middle school classes were held in various school buildings until the construction of the Sweetser School in 1926. After the Sweetser School opened, middle school classes were held at Sweetser and at the high school. When the new Saugus High School building opened in 1955, all middle school classes were moved to the old high school building, with the Sweetser School becoming an elementary school. In October 1963, most of the Saugus Junior High School was destroyed by arson. Junior High classes were moved to the Veterans' Memorial Elementary School and the American Legion Hall, with seventh and eighth graders attending during the day and ninth graders attending class in the afternoon. In 1966, the new Saugus Junior High School on Dow St. opened. In 1970 the school was renamed the Belmonte Middle School after Augustine J. Belmonte, a Saugus police officer killed in the line of duty. The Belmonte closed when the new complex opened in 2020.

== Notable events ==
On April 21, 1914, Saugus High students staged a strike in support of Principal James F. Butterworth, who had resigned under pressure from the School Committee. The students returned the next day on the condition that School Committee hold a public hearing on Butterworth's resignation. The committee refused on the grounds that Butterworth was not entitled to one as he was not fired, but had voluntarily resigned. A special town meeting appointed a committee to investigate the matter. The committee sided with Butterworth and asked for the resignations of every member of the School Committee and the entire high school faculty. Despite the committee's decision, Butterwoth did not return to Saugus High; instead, he accepted the position of Superintendent of Schools in Bradford, Pennsylvania.

In 1937, the school committee invited English teacher Isabelle Hallin to resign amid rumors that she had allegedly served cocktails to students during a drama club rehearsal at her home. Despite petitions and the picketing of Hallin's detractors' homes by students, the School Committee voted 3–2 against reappointing Hallin. Those who voted not to reappoint Hallin insisted that they did so on professional grounds. Hallin's picture appeared in many newspapers and she left Saugus to pursue a career in acting.

On March 27, 1981, the entire 1200-member student body of Saugus High School walked out of class in protest of proposed school cutbacks as a result of Proposition 2½.

In 1987, Saugus High hockey player Mike Maruzzi was paralyzed after he hit the boards head first and broke his neck.

In 1994, two Saugus High School freshmen were expelled for smuggling a loaded, sawed-off shotgun onto school property.

Saugus High School was closed for a week in 1998 while contractors removed asbestos from the auditorium, bathrooms, and second-floor balconies and hallways.

In July 2004, the Saugus School Committee announced that budget cutbacks would result in the elimination of all sports and extracurricular activities. The extracurricular activities were restored by the beginning of the next school year after the district was able to receive extra funding from state.

On November 14, 2006, Saugus High School was on high alert as a result of a bomb threat written in the girls' bathroom.

On December 7, 2007, Saugus High School was put into lockdown and students were evacuated after a caller phoned in a gun threat.

Following the 2012–13 winter break, Principal Joseph Diorio did not return to school and was not seen for several weeks. On January 9, Superintendent Richard Langlois announced that Diorio had been on paid leave since December 18 pending an inquiry "into the management of certain financial and other affairs of Saugus High School." On April 10, 2013 an independent audit into the Saugus High School student activities account was released to the Board of Selectmen. The audit described Saugus High's record keeping as shoddy and in some cases in violation of state law. The audit also questioned $17,000 in stipend payments made to Diorio between 2006 and 2013.

On December 14, 2012, Saugus High School announced on their twitter account that they would join the Cape Ann League, leaving the Northeastern Conference for more success in their school athletics. On January 18, 2013, the move was approved by the Massachusetts Interscholastic Athletic Association.

At the conclusion of Saugus High School's first season in the Cape Ann League, they proposed to rejoin the Northeastern Conference due to geographic and traveling issues. The rejoin was approved by both high school conferences, allowing Saugus High School to return to the Northeastern Conference. All sports would play in the Northeastern Conference, with the exception of football, which would become independent for the 2014 fall season. The Saugus Sachems football team would play opponents from both the Cape Ann League and Northeastern Conference.

== Notable faculty members ==
- Steven Angelo, history and law teacher
- Belden Bly, biology and practical law teacher; also a golf, baseball, basketball, football and track coach.
- Ronnie Cahill, assistant football coach (1940)
- Vernon W. Evans, submaster (1922–1930), principal (1930–1933)
- Henry Toczylowski, football coach (1941–1942)
- Dave Lucey, football coach (1943–1946)

== Notable alumni ==
- Steven Angelo, town administrator and politician
- Tracee Chimo, actress
- Arthur F. DeFranzo, Medal of Honor recipient
- Mark Falzone, member of the Massachusetts House of Representatives from 2001 to 2011.
- Bob Gaudet, Dartmouth College ice hockey coach
- James Franklin Jeffrey, American diplomat
- Phyllis Katsakiores, member of the New Hampshire House of Representatives
- Doug Mackie, professional football player for the New York Giants, Tampa Bay Bandits, New Jersey Generals, New Orleans Saints and Atlanta Falcons
- Francis Moorehouse, Town Manager of Saugus from 1970 to 1973
- C. F. Nelson Pratt, member of the Massachusetts House of Representatives from 1927 to 1935.
- John P. Slattery, member of the Massachusetts House of Representatives from 1995 to 2003.
- Art Spinney, professional football player for the Baltimore Colts
- Art Statuto, professional football player for the Los Angeles Rams and the Buffalo Bills.
- Frederick Willis, Speaker of the Massachusetts House of Representatives from 1944 to 1949.

=== Attended but did not graduate ===
- Elizabeth Bishop, poet, short-story writer. Recipient of the 1976 Neustadt International Prize for Literature, Poet Laureate of the United States from 1949 to 1950, Pulitzer Prize winner for Poetry in 1956 and the National Book Award winner in 1970.
