= Samuel Appleton =

Samuel Appleton may refer to

- Samuel Appleton (born 1625) (1625–1696), American colonial military and government leader
- Samuel Appleton (merchant) (1766–1853), American merchant and philanthropist
