= Mark Falzone =

American politician

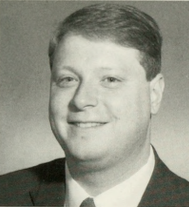
- Portrait of Mark Falzone

Member of the Massachusetts House of Representatives from the 9th Essex district
- In office 2001–2011
- Preceded by: Steven Angelo
- Succeeded by: Donald Wong

Personal details
- Born: June 14, 1975 (age 51) Melrose, Massachusetts
- Party: Democratic
- Spouse: Robin N. Hamilton
- Education: Boston College; Harvard University John F. Kennedy School of Government
- Occupation: Non-profit Executive

Mark V. Falzone (born June 14, 1975 in Melrose, Massachusetts) is an American political figure who is the President of Scenic America and a former member of the Massachusetts House of Representatives.

== Early political career ==
Falzone graduated from Saugus High School, Boston College and Harvard University's John F. Kennedy School of Government. Prior to serving in the house he was a Saugus Town Meeting Member from 1993 to 2000. He was the Chairman of the Saugus Democratic Town Committee from 1996 to 2004.

== State representative ==
Falzone represented the Ninth Essex District in the Massachusetts House of Representatives from 2001 to 2011. He was elected in 2000 by defeating Saugus Selectman Christie Ciampa, Jr. in the Democratic Primary and by besting Patricia Cuddemi and Albert J. DiNardo in the 2000 general election. During his final term, he was a member of the House Committees on Election Laws, Tourism, Arts and Cultural Development, and Veterans and Federal Affairs. He previously served on the House Committee on Ways and Means, the Joint Committee on Bonding, and the House Committee on Capital Expenditures and State Assets.

On November 2, 2010 Falzone lost his bid for a sixth term to Saugus Board of Selectmen Chairman and owner of the Kowloon Restaurant Donald Wong by 382 votes.

== Non-profit executive ==
In 2012, Falzone joined the National Immigration Forum as Deputy Director. In this role, he helped to lead and manage one of the nation's leading pro-immigrant advocacy organizations. In 2017, Falzone was selected as President of Scenic America, the only national group solely dedicated to preserving and enhancing the scenic character of America's communities and countryside.

== Awards and recognition ==
Falzone was twice elected by his colleagues to the Executive Committee of the National Conference of State Legislatures—an honor accorded to only 30 legislators annually. Additionally, Falzone has been conferred numerous honors including the Toll Fellowship from the Council of State Governments and the Flemming Fellowship from the Center for Policy Alternatives. While at the Harvard Kennedy School, Falzone was awarded the Jerome L. Rappaport Sr./Boston Urban Fellowship.

== Personal life ==
Falzone is married to broadcast journalist Robin N. Hamilton. He currently resides in Silver Spring, Maryland.

== Electoral history ==
Mark Falzone electoral history

2000 Democratic primary for the Massachusetts House of Representatives, 9th Essex District

- Mark Falzone - 3,248 (57.4%)
- Christie Ciampa, Jr. - 2,385 (42.1%)

2000 General Election for the Massachusetts House of Representatives, 9th Essex District

- Mark Falzone (D) - 11,553 (62.8%)
- Patricia Cuddemi (R) - 5,058 (27.5%)
- Albert J. DiNardo (I) - 1,755 (9.5%)

2002 Democratic primary for the Massachusetts House of Representatives, 9th Essex District

- Mark Falzone - 4,359 (59.3%)
- Stephen P. Maio - 2,974 (40.5%)

2004 Democratic primary for the Massachusetts House of Representatives, 9th Essex District

- Mark Falzone - 2,437 (59.1%)
- Debra C. Panetta - 1,677 (40.6%)

2004 General Election for the Massachusetts House of Representatives, 9th Essex District

- Mark Falzone (D) - 13,690 (65.7%)
- Michael M. Motzkin (R) - 7,137 (34.2%)

2006 Democratic primary for the Massachusetts House of Representatives, 9th Essex District

- Mark Falzone - 4,637 (59.9%)
- Sean P. Grant - 3,093 (40.0%)

2010 Democratic primary for the Massachusetts House of Representatives, 9th Essex District

- Mark Falzone - 2,725 (54.9%)
- Anthony V. Guardia - 2,202 (44.4%)

2010 General Election for the Massachusetts House of Representatives, 9th Essex District

- Donald Wong (R) - 8,943 (51.0%)
- Mark Falzone (D) - 8,560 (48.9%)
