= Appleton's Pulpit =

Historical landmark in Saugus, Massachusetts

Coordinates: 42°28′14.84″N 71°0′40.43″W

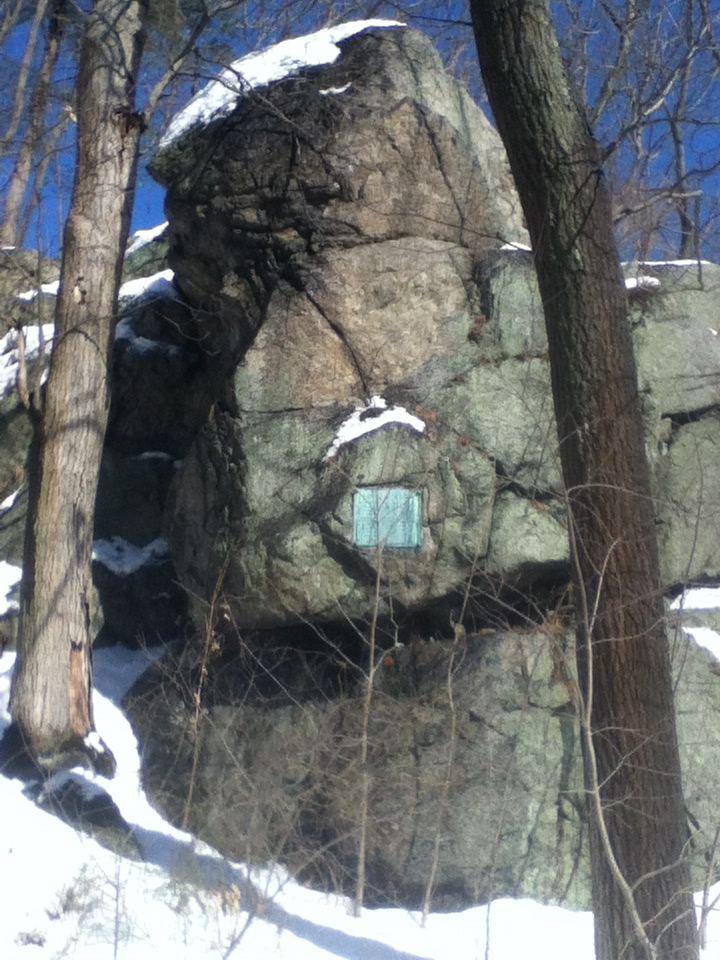
Appleton's Pulpit

Appleton's Pulpit is a historic landmark in Saugus, Massachusetts, United States. It is the location where Major Samuel Appleton is said to have made a speech denouncing the tyranny of Colonial Governor Sir Edmund Andros.

== Speech ==
On September 19, 1687, a warrant was issued for the arrest of Samuel Appleton of Ipswich, Dudley Bradstreet of Andover, and Nathaniel Saltonstall of Haverhill for being "persons factiously and seditiously inclined, and disaffected to his Majesty's government". Two additional warrants were issued on October 3 and October 5. It is believed that during this time, Appleton hid in the home of his son, Colonel Samuel Appleton, who owned the Saugus Iron Works property (in what was then part of Lynn, Massachusetts). While there, Appleton, according to tradition, delivered an address from a rocky cliff near the Iron Works in which he denounced the tyranny of Colonial Governor Sir Edmund Andros. The place where he is said to have delivered the speech became known as Appleton's Pulpit.

=== Accuracy ===
In Ipswich in the Massachusetts Bay Colony, Thomas Franklin Waters disputed the traditional account of events. The October 5 warrant was issued for Samuel Appleton of Lynn for hiding from officers of the law. While it could be inferred that Samuel Appleton was hiding in Lynn and the warrant specified "Samuel Appleton of Lynn" to ensure his arrest, Appleton would testify in his sworn deposition that he was arrested on September 20 and remained in custody until his ultimate release. Therefore, the October 5 warrant was likely for his son, also named Samuel Appleton, who lived in Lynn from 1680 to 1688. Waters also stated that it is improbable that a fugitive from justice would openly harangue the public from a high ledge. However, if the event did take place, Waters contended that it was the younger Appleton who delivered the speech.

== Historical markers ==
Thomas Gold Appleton, a descendant of Samuel Appleton, had a tablet about two and a half feet square fastened to the perpendicular face of the cliff, just below where the speech is supposed to have been made. It was formally presented to the Town of Saugus in March 1882. The tablet read:

APPLETON'S PULPIT
IN SEPTEMBER 1687 FROM
THIS ROCK TRADITION
ASSERTS THAT RESISTING
THE TYRANNY OF SIR EDMUND
ANDROS MAJOR SAMUEL
APPLETON OF IPSWICH SPOKE
TO THE PEOPLE IN BEHALF OF
THOSE PRINCIPALS WHICH
LATER WERE EMBODIED IN
THE DECLARATION OF
INDEPENDENCE.

In 1930, the Massachusetts Bay Colony Tercentenary Commission erected a number of Massachusetts historical markers. Appleton's Pulpit was one of nine sites in Saugus the commission chose to place a marker, which reads:

APPLETON'S PULPIT
IN 1687 MAJOR APPLETON
OF IPSWICH MADE A SPEECH ON
THIS ROCK DENOUNCING THE
TYRANNY OF THE ROYAL GOVERNOR,
SIR EDMUND ANDROS. A WATCH
WAS STATIONED ON THE HILL TO
GIVE WARNING OF ANY APPROACH
OF THE CROWN OFFICERS.
