= Richard E. McLaughlin =

American politician (1915-1993)

Massachusetts Registrar of Motor Vehicles
- In office 1979–1983
- Preceded by: Alan Mackey
- Succeeded by: Alan Mackey
- In office 1964–1971
- Preceded by: James R. Lawton
- Succeeded by: Dave Lucey

Massachusetts Secretary of Public Safety
- In office 1971–1975
- Preceded by: Office created
- Succeeded by: Charles Barry

Personal details
- Born: December 10, 1915
- Died: June 29, 1993 (aged 77) Cambridge, Massachusetts

Richard E. McLaughlin (December 10, 1915 – June 29, 1993) was a Massachusetts government official who served as Registrar of Motor Vehicles and Commissioner of Public Safety.

McLaughlin was appointed Registrar of Motor Vehicles in 1964 by Governor Endicott Peabody. In 1971, Francis W. Sargent appointed McLaughlin to the newly created post of Secretary of Public Safety. He was also a member of the National Highway Safety Advisory Committee.

After a 4-year absence during the Dukakis administration, McLaughlin returned as Registrar of Motor Vehicles under Edward J. King.
