= Scenic America =

U.S. nonprofit organization

- Formation: 1982; 44 years ago
- Legal status: 501(c)(3) nonprofit organization
- Purpose: "Preserve and enhance the scenic beauty of America"
- Headquarters: Suite 1108, 1012 14th St NW, Washington, DC 20005
- Region served: United States
- President: Mark Falzone
- Budget: Revenue: $1,270,000; Expenses: $1,290,000 (FYE 2023)
- Endowment: $1,010,000
- Website: www.scenic.org

Scenic America is a 501(c)(3) nonprofit advocacy organization and the only national group solely dedicated to removing visual blight and preserving and enhancing the scenic character of America's communities and countryside in accordance with its mission statement.

In 2017, Scenic America selected Mark Falzone as its President.

Scenic America has partnered with Project Public Spaces in securing the natural beauty and community character of many cities, towns, and public spaces.
