= Alan Mackey =

American academic and political figure (1924-2001)

Massachusetts Registrar of Motor Vehicles
- In office 1983–1987
- Preceded by: Richard E. McLaughlin
- Succeeded by: Robert M. Hutchinson Jr.
- In office 1977–1979
- Preceded by: Robert A. Panora
- Succeeded by: Richard E. McLaughlin

Personal details
- Born: December 4, 1924 Somerville, Massachusetts
- Died: February 5, 2001 (aged 76) Norwood, Massachusetts
- Education: Northeastern University; Harvard University

Alan A. Mackey (December 4, 1924 – February 5, 2001) was an American academic and political figure who served as Massachusetts registrar of motor vehicles from 1977 to 1979 and from 1983 to 1987.

== Early life ==
Mackey was born in Somerville, Massachusetts. He earned a Bachelor of Science degree from Northeastern University and a master's degree in mathematics at Harvard University. During World War II, he served in the United States Army.

== Northeastern University ==
In 1952, Mackey was hired as a mathematics professor at Northeastern. He later served as administrative assistant in the office of president Asa S. Knowles. In 1964 he was appointed assistant to the dean of administration. In 1976 he was named dean of administrative services. After his appointment as registrar, Mackey took a leave of absence from his position, but continued to teach a night course and consult for the university.

== Registrar of motor vehicles ==
On May 31, 1977, Mackey was named registrar of motor vehicles by Governor Michael Dukakis. Although he had never held any state government offices, he had served 3 years as a school committee member and 8 years as an assessor in Norfolk, Massachusetts. Mackey was not retained by Dukakis' successor Edward J. King and returned to Northeastern as dean of continuing education. Dukakis returned to office in 1983 and on January 6, 1983, he once again made Mackey registrar of motor vehicles. Mackey, who was hospitalized for treatment of a blood clot in his leg, was sworn in from his hospital bed. In 1987, Mackey was found to have given out low-digit licence plates to family, friends, and state legislators in violation of an executive order prohibiting favoritism in issuing licence plates. On April 13, 1987, Dukakis and Mackey announced that low-number licence plates would be distributed by lottery. Eight days later, Dukakis announced that Mackey would be leaving office effective June 30, 1987.

== Death ==
Mackey died on February 5, 2001, in Norwood, Massachusetts. He was 76 years old.
