= Belden Bly Bridge =

Belden G. Bly Bridge Fox Hill Bridge
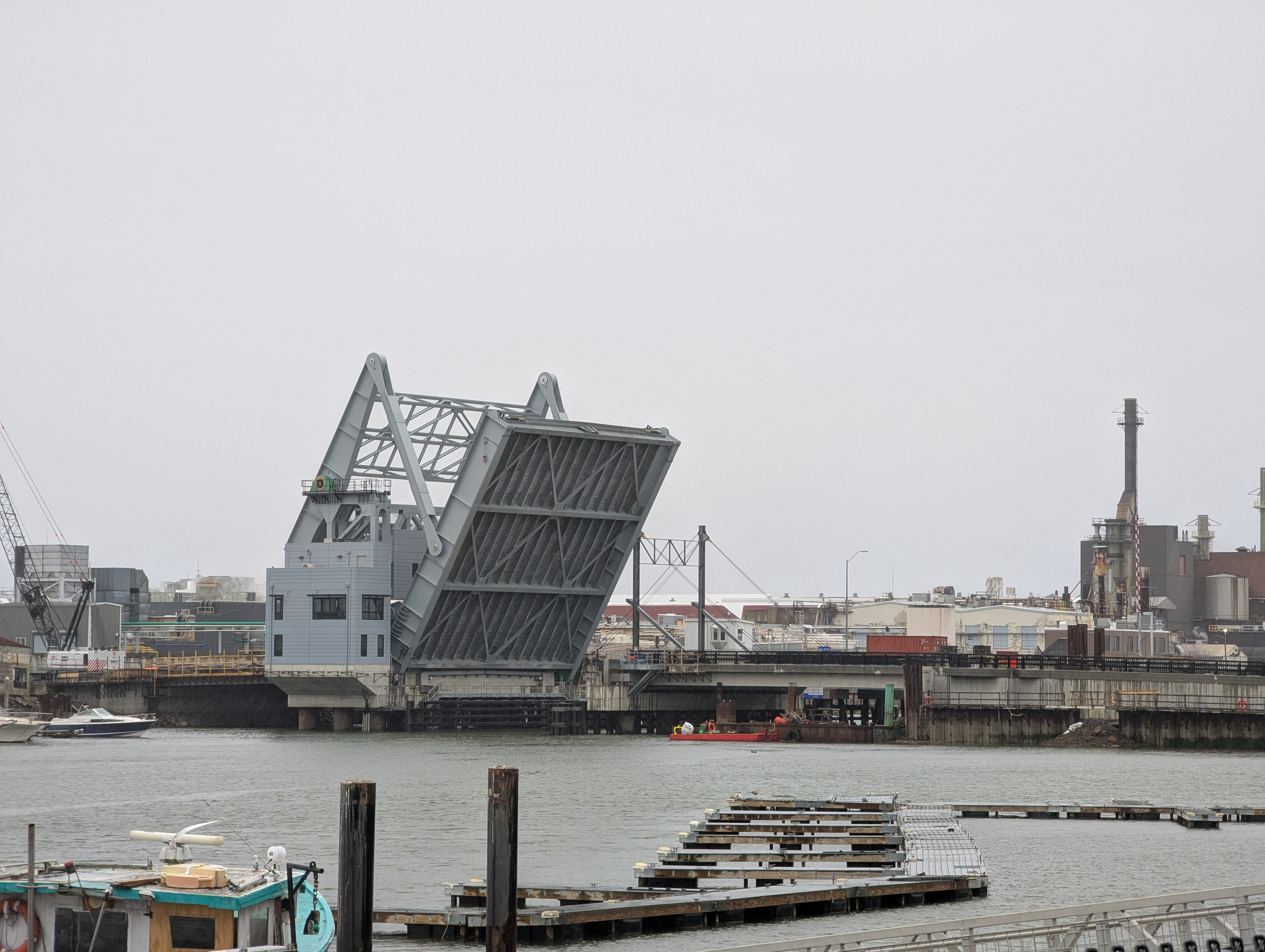
- The new span (left) and the old span's temporary replacement (right) as seen from the Saugus, Massachusetts side of the Saugus River.
- Coordinates: 42°27′3.0″N 70°58′44.5″W
- Carries: Salem Turnpike / Western Ave. / MA State Route 107
- Crosses: Saugus River

Characteristics
- Design: Cantilever bridge, Scherzer Rolling Lift (1912-2013); Cable-Lift Draw Bridge (2013-present)

History
- Fabrication by: Massachusetts Department of Public Works
- Construction end: 1912
- Closed: November 9, 2013

Location
- Interactive map of Belden G. Bly Bridge

Belden G. Bly Bridge originally known as the Fox Hill Bridge was built in 1912 and renamed in 1985 in honor of former member of the Massachusetts House of Representatives Belden Bly. At the time of its demolition, the bridge was the oldest cantilever bridge in the United States still in use as well as the oldest Scherzer Rolling Lift under the supervision of the Massachusetts Department of Public Works. Streetcar tracks originally ran across the bridge.

This bridge closed for several months for repairs on 15 December 2008. The MBTA bus routes 424, 450, 455 and 459 had their routes detoured through Austin Square in West Lynn through Ballard Street in Saugus.

While the bridge was scheduled to be closed for replacement starting in early 2013, problems with the temporary cable-lift draw bridge delayed the project significantly. (On June 3, 2013, a hinge failed on the temporary draw span during what was supposed to have been final testing.) The temporary bridge was finally opened on Nov. 9, 2013, and the 1912 span closed permanently.

Construction began on the replacement bridge (also to be named the Belden G. Bly Bridge) in 2020. The replacement bridge will be of a single leaf bascule bridge design. As of January 2023, the temporary bridge is expected to remain in use until March 2025, at which time the replacement bridge is expected to be completed. As of October 2025 the permanent bridge is still not open. The temporary bridge was closed for one day after inspectors discovered cracking on the bridge’s deck panel assemblies. 4
