= Kowloon Restaurant =

Restaurant in Saugus, Massachusetts

Coordinates: 42°28′4.08″N 71°1′29.78″W

Kowloon Restaurant in 2008

Kowloon Restaurant is a pan-Asian restaurant in Saugus, Massachusetts. The restaurant serves a range of Chinese (Cantonese and Sichuan), Japanese, Thai, and Polynesian, and dishes in several themed dining rooms and lounges. Kowloon was called one of the best Chinese restaurants in New England by Boston television station WHDH in 2004.

Visiting the restaurant is a tradition for many New England families on birthdays, anniversaries, and graduations. It is also considered a top destination for fans of tiki culture and has been a stop on organized tours. The restaurant has been owned through three generations of the same family.

== Attributes ==
Kowloon Restaurant is in Saugus, Massachusetts, a short distance north of Boston. It is a landmark along U.S. Route 1. The property spans 5 acres (2.0 ha).

The restaurant exterior includes a 30 ft (9.1 m) tiki statue above its entrance. The first floor holds a bar, while the second has a showroom stage where Jerry Seinfeld, Frankie Avalon and Phyllis Diller have performed. Comedian and actor Dane Cook is a noted fan, and stated that he has performed there several hundred times. Kowloon has also served as hosts to various events such as weddings, concerts, and The Major Wrestling Figure Podcast.

The restaurant has about 1,200 seats in total. Themed areas include a lagoon, tiki-hut-shaped booths, and a fake ship deck.

== History ==
Kowloon Restaurant in 1978

The Mandarin House restaurant opened August 22, 1950, in a converted ice cream parlor on the Newburyport Turnpike with a menu of a few dozen Chinese and American dishes. The dining room could hold 40-50 customers. In 1958 Madeline and William Wong bought out the first-generation owners and began the second generation of family ownership of the restaurant. They changed the name to Kowloon Restaurant and Cocktail Lounge and began to grow the business.

In the next 50 years, the family added five additions to the original building and increased the capacity to accommodate 1,200 customers. Diners can choose from a number of themed dining rooms including the Volcano Bay Room, the Tiki Lagoon, the Mandarin Room, the Thai Grille, or the Hong Kong Lounge. Private events and a comedy club use the Luau Room.

Since the 1960s the restaurant has had a strong relationship with pro wrestler’s, becoming a go to destination following shows in the Boston area. Wrestlers such as Killer Kowalski, The Undertaker, Hulk Hogan, Mick Foley and John Cena have all regularly dined at the restaurant.

The menu has grown as the restaurant has added new dishes to keep up with the evolving American palate. First Polynesian dishes, then Chinese when Joyce Chen became popular, more Chinese when Nixon went to China, even more Chinese when Sichuan became popular, then Thai, and then Japanese and sushi. Guests now choose from a menu of nearly 300 items.

In 2001 the Wongs were inducted into the Hospitality Hall of Fame by the Massachusetts Restaurant Association. The restaurant has also been nominated for addition to the Inventory of Cultural and Historical Resources by the Saugus Historical Commission. Bill Wong died in 2011 at the age of 88.

The third generation of the Wong family continues to run the business. The restaurant is reported to bring in over $8 million per year as the top-grossing Chinese restaurant in the United States. The current owner is Massachusetts state representative Donald Wong and five siblings.

During the COVID-19 pandemic, the restaurant shut its indoor dining room and furloughed some workers. Kowloon built outdoor dining spaces to seat hundreds of people and increased its takeout business. The restaurant also added a drive-in movie theater.

In 2021, it was reported that amid difficulty in the restaurant industry, the Wong family's next generation will not be involved in Kowloon's operation. The family presented a preliminary plan for a residential subdivision on the site, which would involve tearing down the restaurant. The family anticipates the restaurant's closure in the future, potentially as soon as two to three years. A smaller version of Kowloon is likely on the property.

In 2023, Kowllon’s released a limited edition sneaker in collaboration with Nike and local artist Sway. On July 19, the restaurant was featured on an episode of AEW Dynamite in a segment between MJF and Adam Cole.

9 Dragons, Kowloon's sister restaurant, opened in 2024 and is located inside The Brook Casino in Seabrook, New Hampshire.

The restaurant celebrated its 75th anniversary on August 23, 2025.

In June 2026, Kowloon’s opened another sister restaurant called Kowloon Tiki which is located in Revere, Massachusetts. In November it was announced that Kowloon’s had received approval for two pickup-only drive-thru windows as part of Saugus redevelopment project.
