= Henry Toczylowski =

American football player and coach (1919–1982)

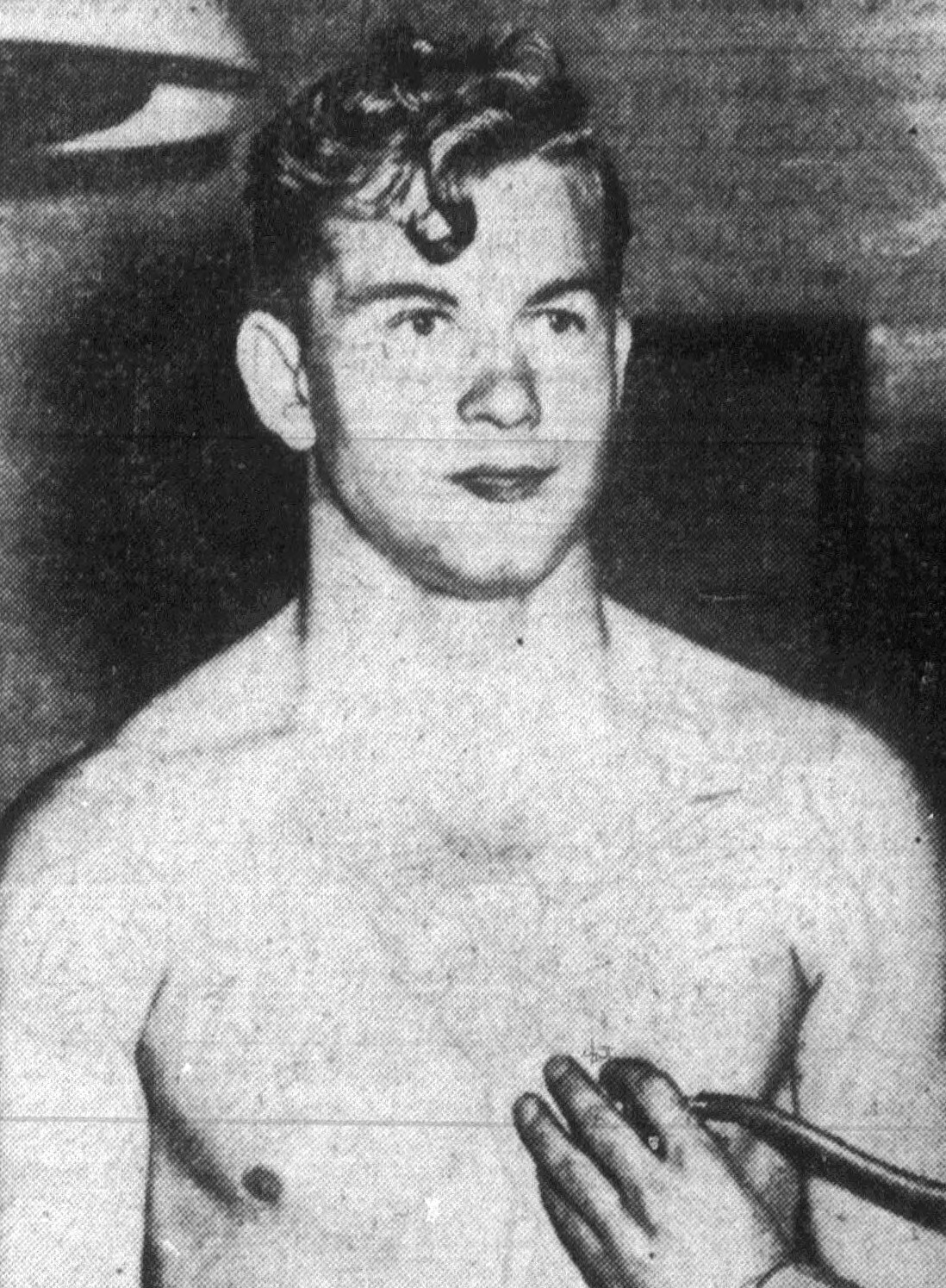
- Toczylowski in 1941

Profile
- Position: Quarterback

Personal information
- Born: February 2, 1919; Lynn, Massachusetts, U.S.
- Died: October 10, 1982 (aged 63); Boston, Massachusetts, U.S.

Career information
- College: Boston College
- NFL draft: 1941: 9th round, 78th overall pick

Career history
- Saugus High School (1941); Beverly High School (1943); Arlington High School (1944–1955)

Awards and highlights
- First-team All-American (1940); Second-team All-Eastern (1940)

Henry M. "Hammering Hank" Toczylowski (February 2, 1919 – October 10, 1982) was an American football player and coach.

A graduate of Lynn Classical High School and St. John's Preparatory School he played college football at the quarterback position for the Boston College Eagles football team and was selected as a first-team player on the 1940 College Football All-America Team. He played on the B.C. team that defeated Tennessee 19–14 in the 1941 Sugar Bowl. During the game, Toczylowski threw a crucial block that allowed Mickey Connolly to score a game-tying touchdown.

Toczylowski was selected by the Brooklyn Dodgers in the 1941 NFL draft and offered a $75 a game contract. He instead accepted a $2,200 a year job as a teacher and head football coach at Saugus High School. After the Dodgers had lost a number of players to military service he was offered a $6,200 contract by the Dodgers, but chose to fulfill his contract and remain at Saugus High until he was called into active service with the United States Navy in May 1942. Toczylowski was released from military service in 1943 and was offered contracts by the Dodgers and the Washington Redskins, but instead chose to become a geometry teacher and head football coach at Beverly High School. In 1944 he moved on to Arlington High School, where he was head football and basketball coach. Toczylowski's 1949 team won the Class A championship and received an invitation to the Sugar Bowl schoolboy classic. He was succeeded as head football coach by Eddie Burns in 1955 but remained at AHS as a house dean and business teacher.

Toczylowski was inducted into the Boston College Varsity Club Athletic Hall of Fame in 1974. He was also inducted into the High School Football Coaches Hall of Fame. He died on October 10, 1982, at St. Elizabeth's Hospital following a stroke.
