= Steven Angelo =

American politician

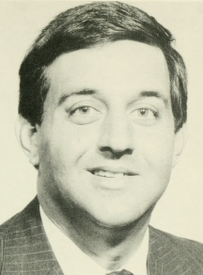

Member of the Massachusetts House of Representatives from the 9th Essex district
- In office 1981–2001
- Preceded by: Belden Bly
- Succeeded by: Mark Falzone

Saugus, Massachusetts Town Manager
- In office July 1, 1998 – August 2002
- Preceded by: Richard Cardillo
- Succeeded by: John Vasapolli (acting); Andrew Bisignani

Winsted, Connecticut Town Manager
- In office December 2003 – November 2005
- Preceded by: Margaret Johnson
- Succeeded by: Ray Carpentino (interim)

Atkinson, New Hampshire Administrator
- In office September 15, 2008 – January 21, 2009
- Preceded by: Russell McAllister
- Succeeded by: Philip Smith, Jr.

Personal details
- Born: June 8, 1952 (age 74) Somerville, Massachusetts
- Party: Democratic
- Education: Merrimack College
- Occupation: Teacher, Politician, Administrator

Steven V. Angelo (born June 8, 1952) is a former state representative and Town Manager.

== Early life ==
Angelo was elected to Town Meeting in 1971 while he was still in college. Following his graduation, Angelo worked as a teacher in the Saugus, Massachusetts school system, teaching history and law.

In 1978, he challenged thirty year incumbent Belden Bly for the 9th Essex District seat in the Massachusetts House of Representatives. He lost by 318 votes.

In 1980, Bly did not run for re-election and Angelo once again ran for the seat. He defeated Lawrence Means and Christie Serino for the Democratic nomination and defeated Republican Clayton Trefry in the general election.

== State representative ==
While in the House he served as the House Chairman of the Natural Resources and Agriculture Committee (1985–1996), and the Government Regulations Committee (1995–1996).

Angelo co-authored the Solid Waste Law which mandated that acid gas scrubbers be placed on the incinerator in Saugus. The law also began what became the state's curbside recycling program.

Additionally, he pushed through laws on Acid Rain, Massachusetts State Revolving Fund, Wildlife Under the Wetlands, Hazardous Waste, Land Stamp, Tidelands, Open Space Acquisition, Underground Petroleum Storage, and the Cape Cod Commission. He served as Chairman of the Special Commission on Hazardous Waste, the Special Commission on Low Level Radioactive Waste, and the Special Commission on Solid Waste.

Steven Angelo electoral history

1978 Democratic primary for the Massachusetts House of Representatives, 9th Essex District

- Steven Angelo - 2,507 (53.5%)
- Michael J. Serino - 2,170 (46.5%)

1978 General Election for the Massachusetts House of Representatives, 9th Essex District

- Belden Bly (R) - 6,961 (51.1%)
- Steven Angelo (D) - 6,643 (48.8%)

1980 Democratic primary for the Massachusetts House of Representatives, 9th Essex District

- Steven Angelo - 1,777 (46.00%)
- Lawrence Michael Means - 1,525 (39.5%)
- Christie Serino - 561 (14.5%)

1980 General Election for the Massachusetts House of Representatives, 9th Essex District

- Steven Angelo (D) - 10,710 (68.2%)
- Clayton W. Trefry (R) - 4,984 (31.8%)

1984 Democratic primary for the Massachusetts House of Representatives, 9th Essex District

- Steven Angelo - 3,635 (71.6%)
- Kathleen Ann Murphy - 1,439 (28.4%)

1990 General Election for the Massachusetts House of Representatives, 9th Essex District

- Steven Angelo (D) - 9,474 (62.8%)
- Robert H. Dawe, Jr. (R) - 5,607 (37.2%)

1992 Democratic primary for the Massachusetts House of Representatives, 9th Essex District

- Steven Angelo - 5,416 (77.7%)
- Albert J. DiNardo - 1,551 (22.3%)

1996 General Election for the Massachusetts House of Representatives, 9th Essex District

- Steven Angelo (D) - 12,937 (71.3%)
- Anthony Cogliano (R) - 5,201 (28.7%)

== Saugus Town Manager ==
In February 1998, Angelo was selected to serve as temporary Town Manager of Saugus starting in July. He was appointed to the position permanently in December 1998. He continued serving as State Representative.

Angelo also lobbied for and received state and federal funds to dredge the Saugus River, a project that had lingered since the 1960s.

Angelo resigned from the job in August 2002 for "personal reasons".

In June 2003, the State Ethics Commission found that Angelo had used his position to secure preferential treatment for selectman Michael Kelleher following Kelleher's January 4, 2002 traffic stop. The Commission decided not to pursue formal action against Angelo. Kelleher and Police Chief Edward Felix were each fined $2,000.

== Winsted Town Manager ==
From December 2003–November 2005, Angelo served as Town Manager of Winsted, Connecticut. During that period, Angelo worked to clean up Highland Lake. He resigned on November 9, 2005, citing his health.

== Atkinson Town Administrator ==
On September 15, 2008, he was hired to serve as the Town Administrator of Atkinson, New Hampshire. He resigned on January 21, 2009 due to his reluctance to sell his home in Falmouth, Massachusetts and family issues.

== See also ==
- 1989–1990 Massachusetts legislature
