= Robin N. Hamilton =

American journalist

Robin Nicole Hamilton is an American journalist, writer, television host, and principal at "ARoundRobin Production Company". She has worked as a broadcast journalist in Florida, New York, Boston, Massachusetts, and Washington, D.C. She directed the 2015 documentary short film This Little Light of Mine: The Legacy of Fannie Hamer.

== Education ==
A native of Columbia, Maryland, Hamilton attended Duke University, earning her undergraduate degree in English. She wrote her thesis on desegregation in Durham. She obtained a master's degree in broadcast journalism from New York University. She also earned a master's degree in public administration with a focus in policy and media from the Harvard University John F. Kennedy School of Government.

== Television and film ==
Hamilton's first on-air reporting duties were as a television reporter in Florida. After a stint in New York, Hamilton became a reporter for WBZ-TV in Boston, Massachusetts in March 2001. After four years, Hamilton was promoted to become the host of the UPN38 Morning Show on UPN38 (WSBK-TV) in Boston, a sister-station of WBZ-TV. The UPN38 Morning Show was modeled as a local version of The Today (U.S. TV program) Show, interspersing news, weather, and traffic with features on fashion, parenting, gardening, and party planning. Hamilton then moved back to Washington, D.C., where she currently works at Tribune-owned CW-affiliate DCW50 TV (WDCW), as a correspondent for the newsmagazine program NewsPlus. She has also hosted DCW50's Living Black History series for the past six years. Hamilton has also made an appearance in the 2012 feature film comedy Ted as a news anchor. She also serves as principal of ARoundRobin Production Company, a video production company.

In 2015, Hamilton wrote, produced and directed the film This Little Light of Mine: The Legacy of Fannie Hamer, a documentary film about the Mississippi civil rights sharecropper who fought for voting rights. Fannie Lou Hamer is most known for her famous testimony during the Democratic National Convention credential committee hearing in 1964, describing brutality blacks faced living in the Jim Crow South. This Little Light of Mine: The Legacy of Fannie Hamer was the opening film for the March on Washington Film Festival on July 15, 2015, and was also screened at the Martha's Vineyard African American Film Festival and the NYC Independent Film Festival. Additionally, the film screened at the Hill Center at the Old Naval Hospital in Washington, D.C., on August 5, 2015, as part of the Library of Congress American Folklife Center's civil rights program series, "Many Paths to Freedom: Looking Back, Looking Ahead at the Long Civil Rights Movement." Following the screening, Hamilton was interviewed by NPR host Michel Martin.

To promote This Little Light of Mine: The Legacy of Fannie Hamer, Hamilton was a guest on the July 19, 2015, episode of Spirit of Jazz on WPFW. Additionally, All Digitocracy wrote a feature story on Hamilton and the film and on August 4, 2015, Hamilton was a guest on the Kojo Nnamdi Show.

== Awards ==
Hamilton has won and been nominated for several awards for her work on the DCW50 TV (WDCW) Living Black History series. On June 15, 2013, Hamilton won a regional Emmy Award for The Dream Began Here, a historical documentary which explores the evolving roles that African Americans have had in Washington, D.C. In 2012, she won a Gracie Award from the Alliance for Women in Media for her work on Hattie's Lost Legacy, which traces the career of the first African American Academy Awards winner Hattie McDaniel and the mystery of her lost Oscar statuette. Hattie's Lost Legacy was also nominated for a 2011 regional Emmy Award for historical documentary.

In addition, Hamilton won a pair of National Association of Black Journalists (NABJ) Salute to Excellence Awards. In 2013 she won for The Dream Began Here and in 2011 she won for Howard Theatre: A Century in Song, a documentary about the historic Howard Theatre. Hamilton was also nominated for a 2012 NABJ Salute to Excellence Award for Hattie's Lost Legacy.

== Public service ==
In the fall of 2010, Hamilton served as a Public Media Corps (PMC) Fellow which allowed her to promote social media tools to underserved communities. PMC is a project of the National Black Programming Consortium (NBPC). Hamilton was also on the board of the Energy Justice Network, an environmental justice advocacy group.

== Personal life ==
Hamilton is married to Mark Falzone.
