= Samuel Appleton (born 1625) =

Military leader of the Massachusetts Bay Colony (1625–1696)

Samuel Appleton (1625 – May 15, 1696) was a military and government leader in the Massachusetts Bay Colony and Province of Massachusetts Bay. He was a commander of the Massachusetts militia during King Philip's War who led troops during the Attack on Hatfield, Massachusetts and the Great Swamp Fight. He also held numerous positions in government and was an opponent of Governor Sir Edmund Andros.

== Early life ==
Appleton was born in 1625 in Little Waldingfield, England to Samuel and Judith (Everard) Appleton. When he was eleven years old he moved to Ipswich, Massachusetts with his father.

Through his mother Judith Everard a number of historians have traced his ancestry to William D'Aubigny, a signer of Magna Carta, and to King Henry I of England.

== Personal life ==
In 1651 he married Hannah Paine of Ipswich. They had three children – Hannah, Judith, and Samuel. On December 8, 1656, he married Mary Oliver. They had four children – John, Issac, Oliver, and Joanna.

In 1664, Appleton sued the Saugus Iron Works, which had been owned by his father-in-law, William Paine, in order to secure an inheritance of £1,500 left by Paine to Appleton's three children with Hannah Paine. Samuel Appleton Jr. would eventually take control of the Ironmaster's House as part of the settlement.

== Military career ==
In 1668, Appleton was chosen to serve as a deputy to the Massachusetts General Court and received the title of Lieutenant. He served in the company of his brother, Captain John Appleton, from 1669 to 1671. He then served by himself from 1673 to 1675. In 1675, King Philip's War broke out and Appleton was promoted to captain. On September 24, 1675, Appleton received a commission to command a foot company of 100 men. He proceeded to the Connecticut River Valley, where Captain Thomas Lathrop's Company had been destroyed on September 18.

On October 4, Major John Pynchon resigned as Commander-in-Chief of the militia headquarters in Hadley and Appleton was chosen to succeed him. Not knowing where the next attack would come from, Appleton divided his army among three towns. He stationed a force in Northampton under the command of Lieutenant Nathaniel Sealy. This group was supplemented by troops under the command of Robert Treat of Connecticut. A second group, under the command of Captains Jonathan Poole and Samuel Moseley, was stationed in Hatfield. Appleton himself commanded the third force, which was stationed in Hadley.

=== Attack on Hatfield ===
At noon on October 19, several fires were spotted north of Hadley. Captain Moseley sent out a scouting party of ten men who were ambushed two miles outside of the garrison. Six of the men were killed and three were captured. Moseley sent to Hadley and Northampton for reinforcements. Appleton and most of his men crossed the river and joined Moseley. Around 4 pm, a large band of Native American warriors charged the settlement. Appleton defended one side of the town, Captain Poole defended the other, and Captain Moseley defended the middle. Appleton's sergeant was killed by his side and Appleton just missed getting shot as a bullet went through his hat. After two hours the warriors retreated in confusion. The battle at Hatfield was the Native Americans' first real setback of the war and a turning point for the English colonists, as it proved that the Native Americans could be repelled if the militia was prepared.

=== Great Swamp Fight ===
In November 1675, the commissioners of the United Colonies of New England had evidence that the neutral Narragansett tribe was assisting Metacomet. They chose to launch a preemptive strike on the Narragansett. On December 8, 527 members of the Massachusetts militia, led by Appleton, gathered in Dedham, Massachusetts. Plymouth Colony gathered 159 men under the command of William Bradford and Connecticut moved 300 men under the command of Robert Treat, along with 150 Mohegan warriors. Governor Josiah Winslow of Plymouth Colony was named Commander-in-Chief. On December 19, 1675, the Narragansett fort was captured in the Great Swamp Fight. 110 of Appleton's men were either killed or wounded in the battle. Afterwards, Appleton and his remaining men returned to Boston and he retired from active service.

== Civil service ==
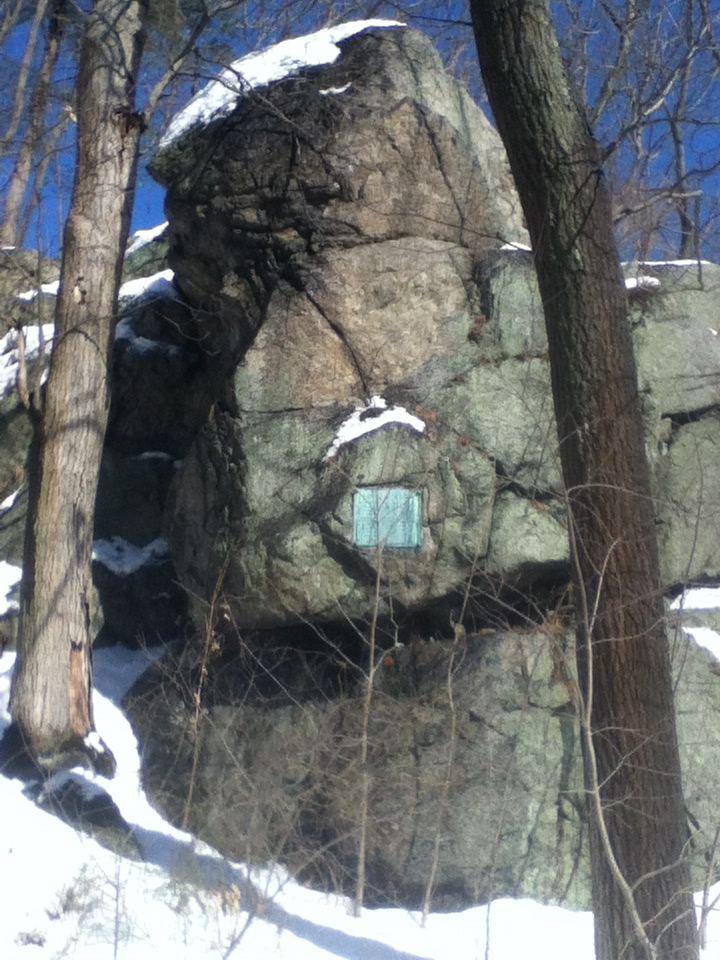
Appleton's Pulpit, the location where Appleton is said to have made a speech denouncing the tyranny of Governor Andros

In 1668, Appleton served as a Commissioner of Essex County. From 1668 to 1671, 1673 to 1675, and 1679 to 1681 he was a deputy to the Massachusetts General Court. From 1681 to 1686 he was a member of the council of assistants.

=== Opposition to Andros government ===
Appleton opposed the government of Colonial Governor Sir Edmund Andros as early as 1682. In 1687, Appleton refused to pay taxes levied by Andros without approval of the council. On September 19, 1687, a warrant was issued for Appleton's arrest for being "factiously and seditiously inclined, and disaffected to his Majesty's government". According to tradition, Appleton hid at his son's home in Saugus (then part of Lynn) and delivered an address from a rocky cliff near the Iron Works in which he denounced the tyranny of Andros. The place where he is said to have delivered the speech became known as Appleton's Pulpit.

Appleton was arrested on September 20 and brought before the Council on October 5. He remained in prison until March 7, 1688, when he was released by the Superior Court in exchange for a £1,000 bond for his future appearance.

=== Later service and death ===
Appleton was a member of the council that governed Massachusetts between the 1689 Boston revolt and the Charter of Province of Massachusetts Bay taking effect in 1692. He served as justice of the Quarterly and General Sessions Court. He was also a member of the Governor's Council in Salem on April 11, 1692, which interrogated Elizabeth Proctor and Sarah Cloyce on charges of witchcraft brought against them. Both, plus Elizabeth's husband, John Proctor, were bound over for trial once a Superior Court could be convened to hear the cases. Appleton died on May 15, 1696.

== Descendants ==
Appleton's descendants include President Calvin Coolidge, First Lady Jane Pierce, Bowdoin College president Jesse Appleton, entomologist Alpheus Spring Packard, professor William Alfred Packard, Maine Supreme Judicial Court Chief Justice John Appleton, Union Army Colonel John F. Appleton, Congressmen William Appleton and Nathan Appleton, merchant and philanthropist Samuel Appleton, author Thomas Gold Appleton, publishers Daniel Appleton, William Henry Appleton, and George Swett Appleton, Major General Francis Henry Appleton, artist Ernest Wadsworth Longfellow, philanthropist and preservationist Alice Mary Longfellow, and poet Robert Frost.
