= Saugus, Massachusetts =

Town in the United States

- Town
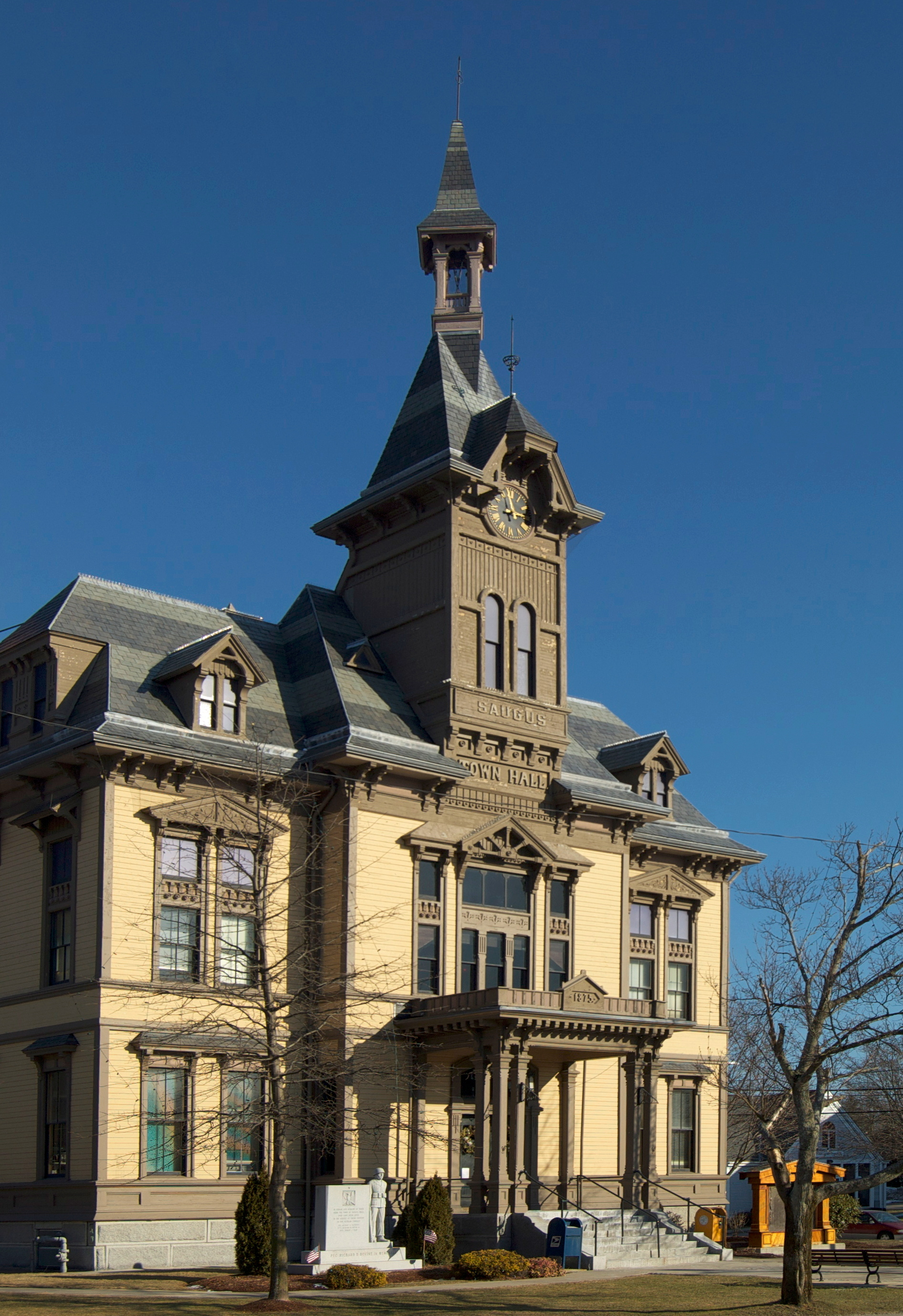
- Saugus Town Hall

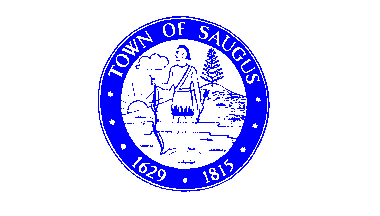
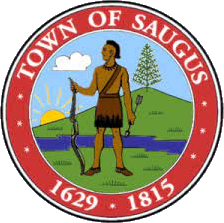
- Flag Seal
- Motto: Sachems
- Location in Essex County and the state of Massachusetts.
- Coordinates: 42°27′53″N 71°00′38″W
- Country: United States
- State: Massachusetts
- County: Essex
- Settled: 1629
- Incorporated: 1815

Government
  - Type: Town Manager–Board of Selectmen/Representative town meeting
  - Town Manager: Scott Crabtree
  - Board of Selectmen: Anthony W. Cogliano, Sr. Corinne R. Riley; Michael J. Serino; Debra C. Panetta; Jeffrey V. Cicolini

Area
  - Total: 11.8 sq mi (30.6 km^{2})
  - Land: 10.8 sq mi (28.0 km^{2})
  - Water: 1.0 sq mi (2.6 km^{2})
- Elevation: 20 ft (6 m)

Population (2024)
  - Total: 28,521
  - Density: 2,640/sq mi (1,020/km^{2})
- Time zone: UTC-5 (Eastern)
  - Summer (DST): UTC-4 (Eastern)
- ZIP code: 01906
- Area code: 339 / 781
- FIPS code: 25-60015
- GNIS feature ID: 0619454
- Website: Town of Saugus, Official Web Site

Saugus (/ˈsɔː.ɡəs/, SAW-gəs) is a town in Essex County, Massachusetts, United States, in the Greater Boston area. The population was 28,619 at the 2020 census. Saugus is known as the site of the first integrated iron works in North America.

== History ==
Native Americans inhabited the area around Saugus for thousands of years before the arrival of European settlers in the 1620s. At the time of European arrival, the Naumkeag, also known as Pawtucket, under the leadership of Montowampate were based near present-day Saugus and controlled land extending from what is now Boston to the Merrimack River. English settlers took the name Sagus or Saugus from the Pawtucket word for "outlet", and used the term to refer to the Saugus River and the region that includes the present day cities and towns of Swampscott, Nahant, Lynn, Lynnfield, Reading, North Reading and Wakefield) which were later renamed Lin or Lynn in 1637, after King's Lynn in Norfolk, England.

In 1646, the Saugus Iron Works, then called Hammersmith, began operations. It was the first integrated iron works in North America as well as one of the most technologically advanced in the world. The Iron Works produced over one ton of iron a day but was not financially successful. It closed around 1670.

In September 1687, Major Samuel Appleton was said to have given a speech from a rocky cliff near the Iron Works denouncing the tyranny of Colonial Governor Sir Edmund Andros. The place where he is said to have delivered the speech became known as Appleton's Pulpit.

Nearly 100 men from Saugus fought in the American Revolutionary War. Saugus' preacher, Parson Joseph Roby, worked to strengthen the spirit of independence in Saugus and was instrumental in seeing that Saugus sent a large contingent to fight in the war.

The nineteenth century ice industry began in Saugus when in 1804 Frederic Tudor cut ice from a pond on the family farm and shipped it to Martinique.

In 1805 the Newburyport Turnpike (now U.S. 1) was built. About four miles of this road were built in Saugus. At first, the turnpike was considered a mistake, as it was built over hills and swamps and grass soon grew over the roadbed. From 1840 to 1846, the tolls were discontinued and it became a public highway. The invention of the automobile resulted in an increase in traffic on the Turnpike. In 1933 the road was widened and an overpass was added to separate the traffic on Route 1 and Main Street. In the 1950s, new businesses started relocating to Route 1. Today, the businesses along Route 1 generate millions of dollars for Saugus.

The Lynn territory was shortened beginning in 1814 with the incorporation of Lynnfield. On February 17, 1815, present-day Saugus was officially incorporated as a town. The first town meeting was held on March 13, 1815, in the parish church. At the time of its incorporation, Saugus' population was 784. Its main industry was agriculture.

During the Industrial Revolution, many new industries moved to Saugus. Shoes and woolen goods were made in Saugus Center, and tobacco was manufactured in Cliftondale and East Saugus.

Saugus' first post office was established in 1832 in East Saugus. In 1858 two more were established—one in Saugus Center and one in Cliftondale. Now only the Cliftondale post office remains in Saugus.

The first town hall was built in 1837. It was built with $2,000 of the United States revenue surplus distributed by President Andrew Jackson. It is currently an American Legion hall. In 1875, the town built its second and current town hall on Central Street. The construction of the town hall put Saugus in a $50,000 debt. For this and other reasons, the neighborhood of East Saugus sought to be set off from Saugus and annexed to the city of Lynn. East Saugus was unable to get a bill in both houses of the state legislature, and the issue was dropped after the town appropriated $5,000 for the laying of water pipes through East Saugus.

Passenger trains ran through Saugus from 1853 to 1958 on the Saugus Branch Railroad. There were three Saugus Branch stations in Saugus (Saugus Center, Cliftondale, and Pleasant Hills) and two just outside the town's borders in Lynn (East Saugus) and Revere (Franklin Park).

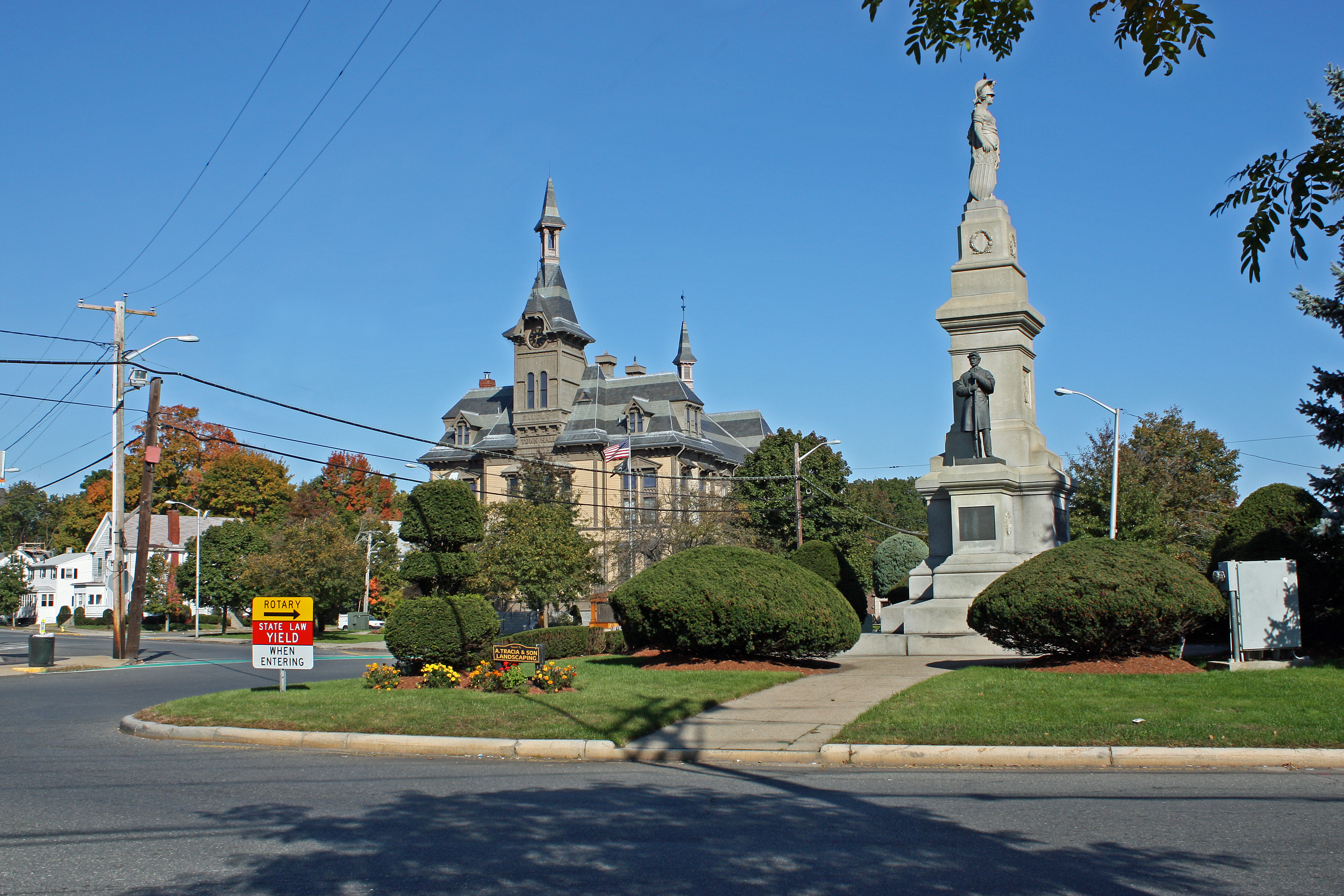
Saugus Civil War Memorial and Town Hall

During the American Civil War, 155 Saugonians enlisted in the Union Army, and eight others enlisted in the Union Navy. Saugus native Gustavus Fox served as the United States Assistant Secretary of the Navy during the war. The USS Saugus, a Union Navy monitor named after the town, was launched in December 1863. Following the war, Henry E. Hone donated a large granite monument to the town of Saugus. The monument, which was designed by Melzar Hunt Mosman and cost $10,000 to build, contains the names of all of the men from Saugus who served during the Civil War on bronze tablets. Above the tablets are two bronze statues, one of a soldier and one of a sailor. It is topped by a granite statue of a woman wearing a helmet with an eagle on the top and holding a shield in her right hand, which serves as an allegorical representation of the United States. The monument was erected in the rotary at Saugus Center in 1875.

Following the Civil War, the Cliftondale section of Saugus became a major producer of tobacco, as many of the southern tobacco plantations had been destroyed. Waitt & Bond became a major producer of cigars and the snuff factory in East Saugus was the nation's largest producer of that product.

From 1859 to 1905, Saugus was home to the Franklin Park harness racing track. also known as the Old Saugus Race Track or Saugus Race Course. It closed in 1905 after local citizens complained about the questionable patrons that the racetrack attracted. In 1911 the racetrack became an airfield. In 1912, the property was purchased by the General Aviation Corporation who named it Atwood Park in honor of their most famous pilot, Harry Atwood. The airfield saw the first airmail delivery in New England on May 30, 1912. Pioneer aviators Ruth Bancroft Law and Lincoln J. Beachey flew at Saugus. The airport closed in the 1920s.

On October 8, 1900, George E. Bailey was murdered at Breakheart Hill Farm in Saugus. His legs and torso would be found nine days later in Floating Bridge Pond in Lynn. His head and arms were found there the next day. After a highly publicized investigation and trial, John C. Best was found guilty of murder. He was executed on September 9, 1902.

In 1934, Breakheart Hill Forest, a private hunting retreat located in North Saugus, was purchased by the Metropolitan District Commission for use as a state park. Shortly after purchasing Breakheart, the MDC turned the land over to the Civilian Conservation Corps, which built roads and trails, planted trees, and restored two dams on the property. In 1936, Breakheart Reservation was opened to the public.

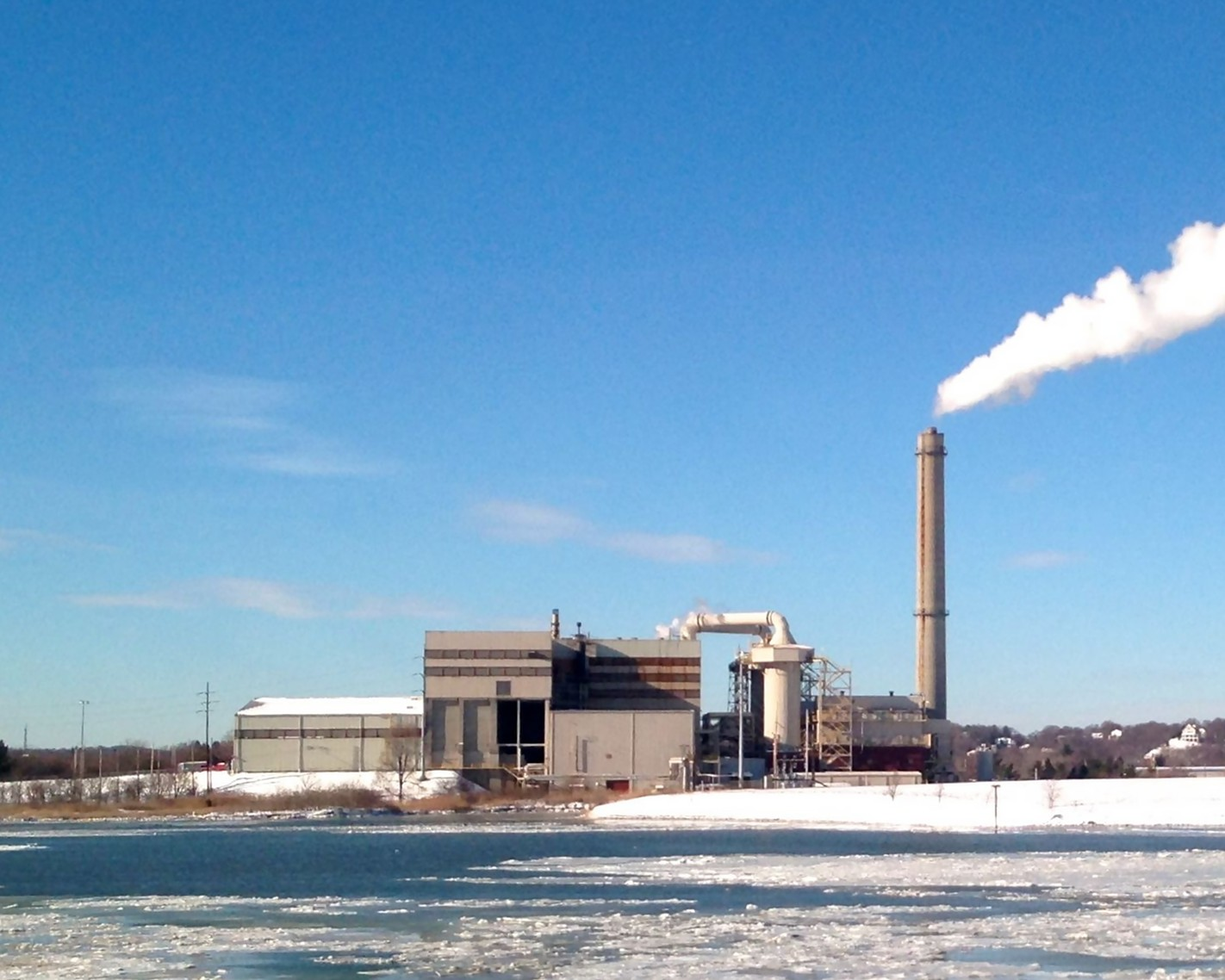
Wheelabrator Technologies' Waste-to-Energy plant in Saugus became the first commercially successful incineration plant in the U.S.

Following a June 2, 1947, referendum, the town adopted a Plan E form of government. Saugus became the first town in Massachusetts to accept this form of government. On February 16, 1948, James Shurtleff was unanimously chosen by the Board of Selectmen to become the first Town Manager of Saugus.

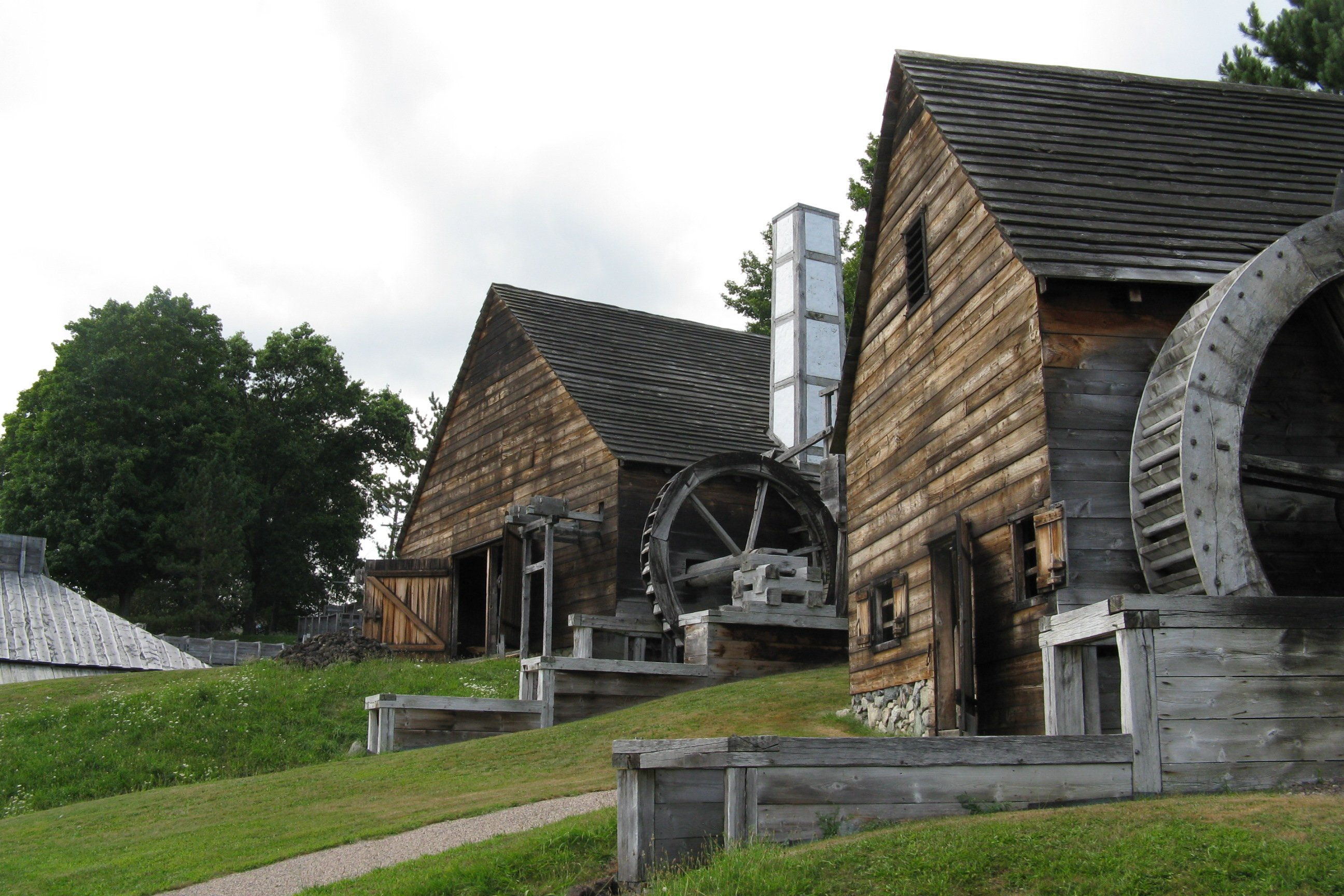
Saugus Iron Works National Historic Site

In 1948, archaeologist Roland W. Robbins began excavating the site of the Saugus Iron Works, which had become hidden by underbrush since its closure. Based on the archeological evidence gathered by Robbins as well as historical documents and conjecture, the First Iron Works Association, with funding from the American Iron and Steel Institute, reconstructed the Saugus Iron Works. The Saugus Iron Works was opened on September 18, 1954, and operated as a private museum from 1954 until April 5, 1968, when it was renamed the Saugus Iron Works National Historic Site and became part of the National Park Service system.

Saugus is home to the oldest barber shop in the United States. The nearly 127-year-old George's Barber Shop is located in Cliftondale Square, Saugus. A 6th Generation family business originally opened in 1898.

In the 1970s, the town, led by Town Manager Francis Moorehouse, attempted to transform the area around Route 107 by having an oil refinery and a garbage incineration plant built. Although the refinery plans fell through in October 1975, the incineration plant was completed. It would become the first commercially successful incineration plant in the U.S. and is still in operation today.

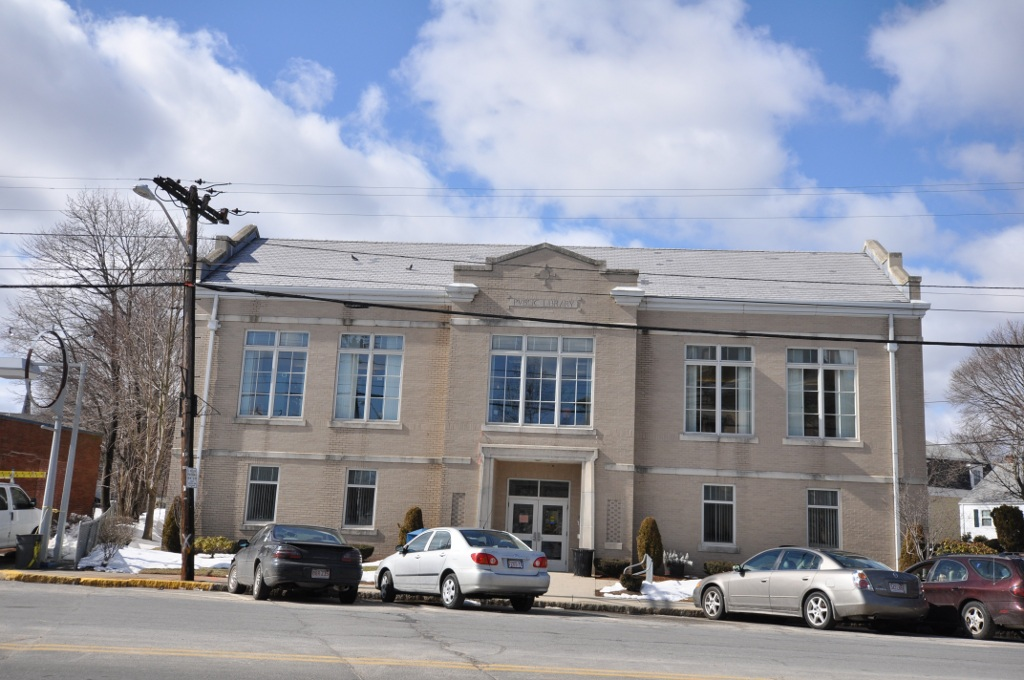
Saugus Public Library

In 1989, the attempted murder of Frank Salemme (infamous criminal associate of Whitey Bulger and Stephen Flemmi) by Angelo Mercurio took place in Saugus.

During the 1990s and 2000s, the town's Capital Improvement Plan, designed by Edward J. Collins, Jr., resulted in the construction of the new public safety building, senior center, library and public works facility. The Saugus Town Hall and the Stackpole Field clubhouse were renovated. In 2001, Town Manager Steven Angelo was able to secure federal funds to dredge the Saugus River, a project that had lingered since the 1960s.

The Saugus American Little League team represented New England in the 2003 Little League World Series. The team finished the tournament in 4th place. Its come-from-behind victory over Richmond, Texas in the tournament's quarterfinals was nominated for the Best Game ESPY Award.

== Geography and transportation ==
According to the United States Census Bureau, the town has a total area of 11.8 square miles (30.6 km^{2}), of which 10.8 square miles (28.0 km^{2}) is land and 1.0 square mile (2.6 km^{2}), or 8.53%, is water. The town lies just inland from Massachusetts Bay, divided from the ocean by the Point of Pines neighborhood of Revere. The southern end of town is dominated by Rumney Marsh, which lies along the Pines River, a tributary of the Saugus River. The Saugus River flows through town and is fed by several brooks. There are several ponds within town, including parts of Birch Pond, Hawkes Pond and Walden Pond. Part of the Lynn Woods Reservation, and most of the Breakheart Reservation and Rumney Marsh Reservation lie within town.

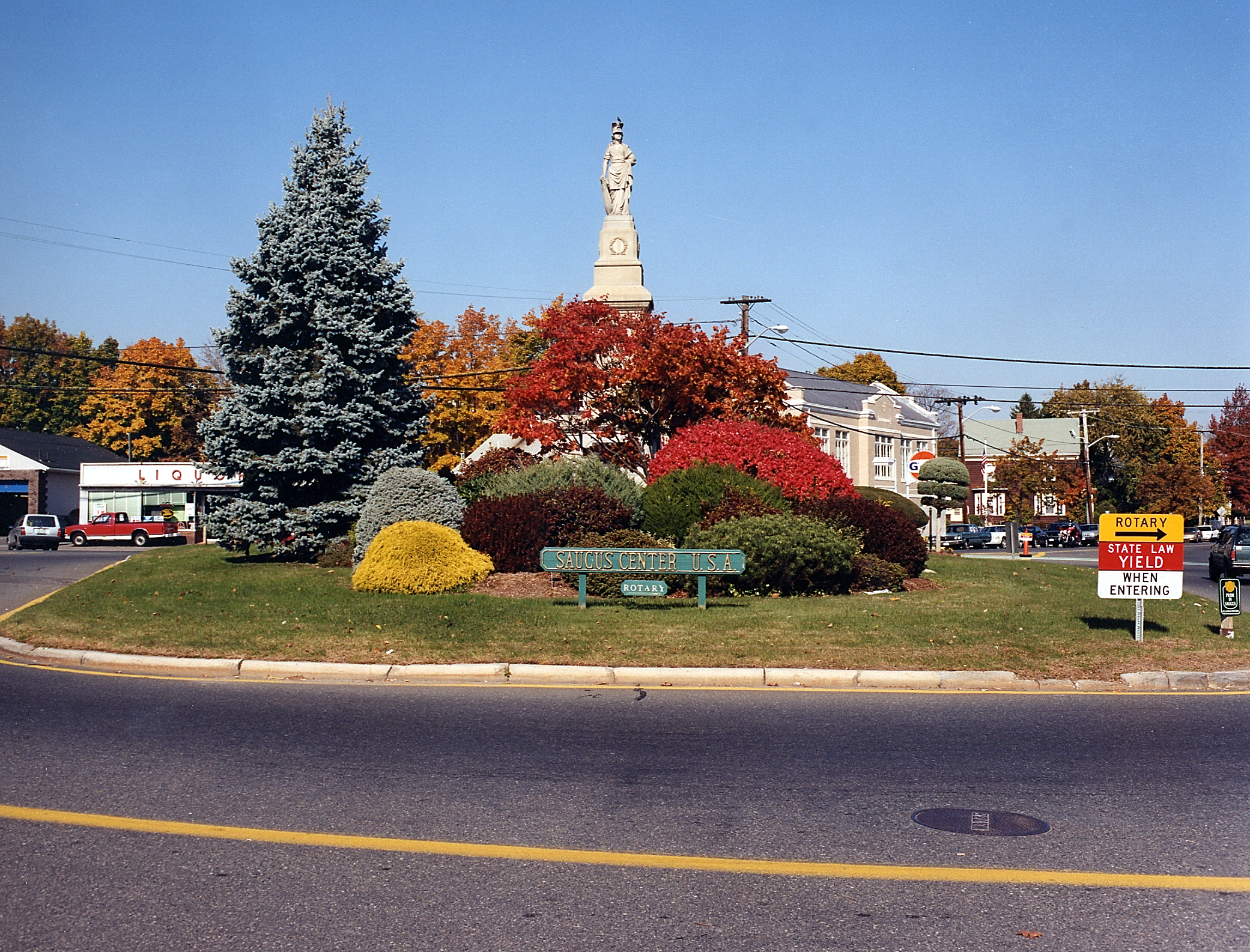
Saugus Center rotary

Saugus is divided into several neighborhood villages, including Saugus Center, East Saugus, North Saugus, Pleasant Hills, Lynnhurst, Oaklandvale, Hammersmith Village, Golden Hills, Blacksmith Village, Bristow and Cliftondale. Of these, the majority of the town's population resides in Lynnhurst, Pleasant Hills, Cliftondale, East Saugus and Saugus Center; Oaklandvale and North Saugus are much less densely populated. The town lies at the southern end of Essex County (though it is not the southernmost town in the county; Nahant extends just south of the town). The town is also bordered by Lynnfield to the north, Lynn to the east, Revere (in Suffolk County) to the south, and Melrose and Wakefield (both in Middlesex County) to the west. The town also shares a common point with the city of Malden, where it also meets Melrose and Revere. Saugus lies 8 miles (13 km) southwest of Salem, 9 miles (14 km) northeast of Boston, 24 miles (39 km) southwest of Cape Ann and 20 miles (32 km) south of the New Hampshire state line.

U.S. Route 1 passes through town as a high-speed divided six-lane highway, with five exits throughout town. This stretch of Route 1, though not a full controlled access highway (it is lined with a major shopping district, including the Square One Mall), is the main commuter route out of Boston for the North Shore region, heading towards the interchange of Interstate 95 and Massachusetts Route 128 in Lynnfield, effectively serving as a practical extension of I-95 into Boston. Route 1 through Saugus was once known for its abundance of kitschy roadside commercial architecture, including the 68-foot neon cactus of the Hilltop Steak House, though since the 2000s some of these landmarks have been demolished or fallen into disrepair. The route is also shared by a 3/4-mile long concurrency with Route 129, which passes through North Saugus before joining Route 1 to head northward into Lynnfield. Route 99 terminates at Route 1 as well, in the southern end of town. Route 107 passes through the town as the Salem Turnpike through the Rumney Marsh, crossing the Saugus River into Lynn over the Fox Hill Bridge.

The Newburyport/Rockport Line of the MBTA Commuter Rail passes through the southeastern corner of Saugus but does not have a station in Saugus. The town is served by several MBTA bus routes. The nearest airport is Boston's Logan International Airport.

== Demographics ==
Historical population
Year	Pop.	±%
1820	748	—
1830	960	+28.3%
1840	1,098	+14.4%
1850	1,552	+41.3%
1860	2,024	+30.4%
1870	2,247	+11.0%
1880	2,625	+16.8%
1890	3,673	+39.9%
1900	5,084	+38.4%
1910	8,047	+58.3%
1920	10,874	+35.1%
1930	14,700	+35.2%
1940	14,825	+0.9%
1950	17,162	+15.8%
1960	20,666	+20.4%
1970	25,110	+21.5%
1980	24,746	−1.4%
1990	25,549	+3.2%
2000	26,078	+2.1%
2010	26,628	+2.1%
2020	28,619	+7.5%
2024*	29,029	+1.4%
* = population estimate. Source: United States census records and Population Estimates Program data.

As of the census of 2010, there were 26,628 people, 10,318 households, and 7,144 families residing in the town. The population density was 2,373.7 inhabitants per square mile (916.5/km^{2}). The racial makeup of the town was 91.9% White, 4.0% Hispanic or Latino, 2.7% Asian, 2.1% Black or African American, 0.1% Native American, 0.0% Pacific Islander, 1.6% from other races, and 1.6% from two or more races.

There were 10,318 households, out of which 17.1% had children under the age of 18 living with them, 53.0% were married couples living together, 11.5% had a female householder with no husband present, 4.7% had a male householder with no wife present, and 30.8% were non-families. The average household size was 2.55 and the average family size was 3.09.

In the town, the population was spread out, with 4.5% under the age of 5, 5.2% from 5 to 9, 5.7% from 10 to 14, 5.9% from 15 to 19, 5.6% from 20 to 24, 5.6% from 25 to 29, 5.5% from 30 to 34, 6.4% from 35 to 39, 7.3% from 40 to 44, 8.1% from 45 to 49, 8.4% from 50 to 54, 7.5% from 55 to 59, 6.9% from 60 to 64, 4.9% from 65 to 69, 3.8% from 70 to 74, 3.6% from 75 to 79, 2.9% from 80 to 84, and 2.3% who were 85 years of age or older. The median age was 43.9 years.

The median income for a household in the town was $85,301, and the median income for a family was $95,782. Males had a median income of $53,219 versus $42,783 for females. The per capita income for the town was $25,524. About 3.1% of families and 4.2% of the population were below the poverty line, including 4.5% of those under age 18 and 7.2% of those age 65 or over.

== Government ==
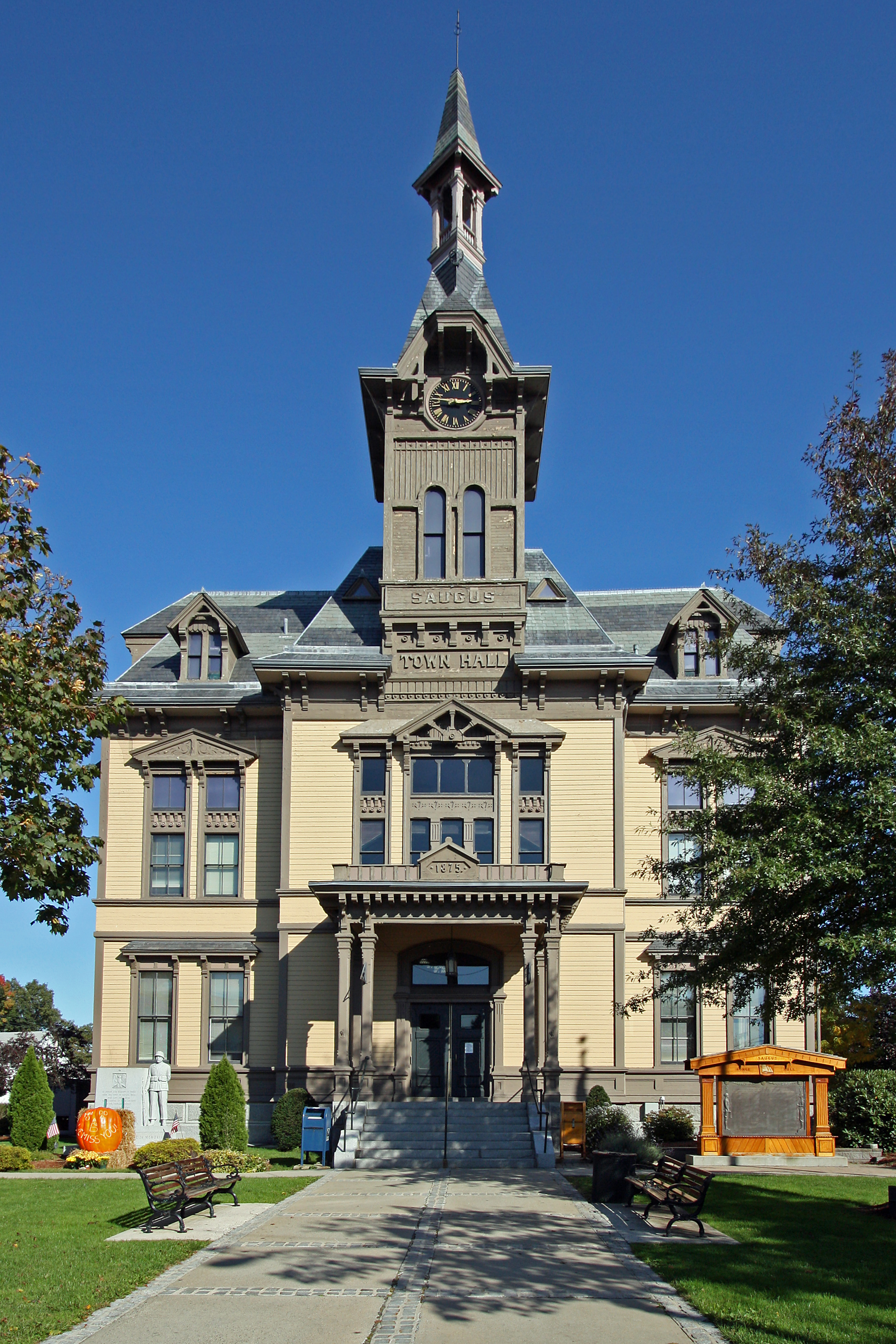
Saugus Town Hall front view

Since 1947 Saugus has had a Plan E form of government, which is a combination of representative town meeting and Town Manager. Saugus was the first town in Massachusetts to accept this form of government. This plan included a Single transferable vote voting system, but this was abandoned in 1950.

Elections for all seats on the Board of Selectmen, School Committee, Town Meeting, and Housing Authority are held biennially in odd-numbered years.

=== Town manager ===
The Town Manager serves as the chief administrative manager and chief fiscal officer of Saugus, Massachusetts and is appointed by the Board of Selectmen.

=== Board of Selectmen ===
The Board of Selectmen consists of five at-large members. The Board serves as the chief policy makers of the Town. Selectmen are ineligible to hold any other town office.

=== School committee ===
The School Committee consists of five at-large members. School Committee members are ineligible to hold any other town office.

=== Town meeting ===
Saugus representative town meeting consists of 50 members; five for each of the town's ten precincts. The annual town meeting is held on the first Monday in May. At the first town meeting after each election of town meeting members, a moderator of all town meetings shall be elected by the body. The moderator must be a town meeting member.

== Education ==
It is served by the Saugus Public Schools, which operates Saugus Middle-High School (grades 6-12), Belmonte Upper Elementary (grades 2-5), and the Veterans Memorial Lower Elementary (grades Pre-k to 1st). It also contains Pioneer Charter School of Science II, which serves grades 7-12.

== Media ==
Saugus Community Television or SCTV is a Public-access television station that provides local television programing to the community.

SCTV broadcasts to Saugus Comcast cable subscribers on channel 8 (public-access), channel 9 (government), and channel 22 (educational).

Saugus is home to one newspaper, the Saugus Advocate, and is also covered by The Daily Item of Lynn.

Since 1950, the transmitter for WROL has been located off of the Salem Turnpike in Saugus. It was previously used by WHDH from 1934 to 1948.

== Points of interest ==
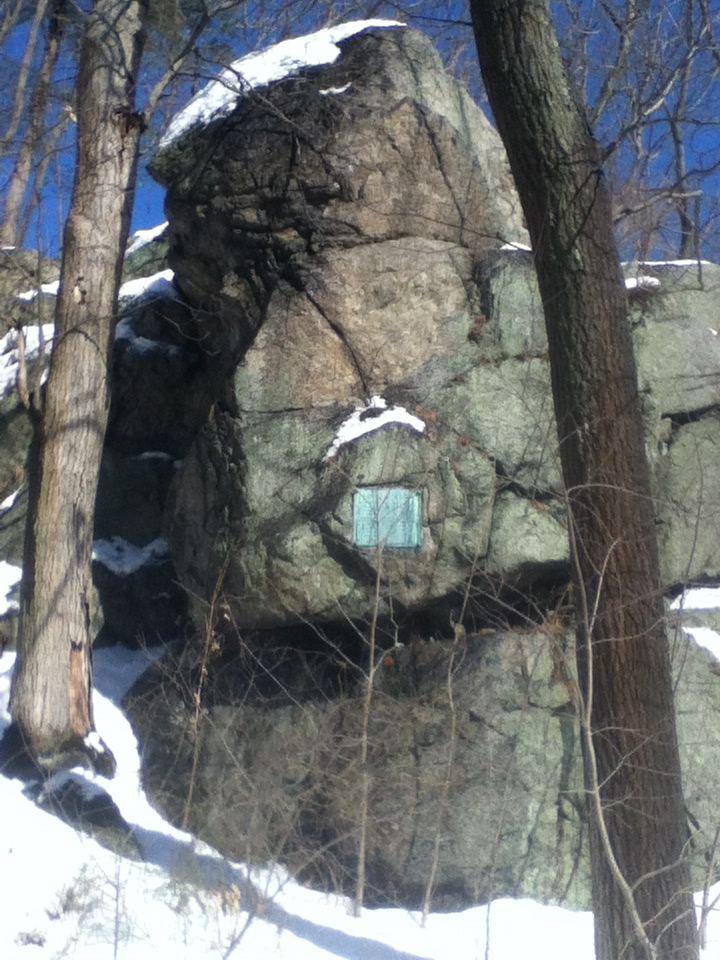
Appleton's Pulpit

- Appleton's Pulpit
- Belden Bly Bridge
- Boardman House
- Breakheart Reservation
- Camp Nihan
- Kowloon Restaurant
- Prankers Pond
- Rumney Marsh Reservation
- Saugus Middle-High School
- Saugus Iron Works National Historic Site
- Saugus River
- Saugus Town Hall
- Square One Mall

== Films and television shows filmed in Saugus ==
- American Playhouse episode "Three Sovereigns for Sarah" (1985)
- The Joneses (2009)
- Food Paradise episodes "Steak Paradise" (2008) and "Donut Paradise" (2008)
- Furry Vengeance (2010)
- Mark of the Dog Rose (2012)
- Grown Ups 2 (2013) filmed at Stackpole Field
